= List of The Red Green Show episodes =

The Red Green Show is a Canadian sitcom. It premiered January 4, 1991 and ended April 7, 2006. It aired 300 half-hour episodes, 6 specials, and one film.

== Series overview ==
Season	Episodes	Specials	Originally released	
Season	Episodes	Specials	First released	Last released
1	24	0	January 4, 1991	March 4, 1992
2	24	0	September 23, 1992	March 3, 1993
3	24	0	September 22, 1993	March 2, 1994
4	24	0	September 24, 1994	March 4, 1995
5	24	1	September 30, 1995	March 16, 1996
6	24	1	September 30, 1996	March 17, 1997
7	17	1	1997	1998
8	14	0	1998	1999
9	17	1	1999	2000
10	18	0	2000	2001
11	17	1	October 12, 2001	April 12, 2002
12	18	0	October 18, 2002	February 14, 2003
13	18	1	October 24, 2003	March 10, 2004
14	18	0	October 1, 2004	February 25, 2005
15	19	0	November 11, 2005	April 7, 2006

== Season 1 (1991–1992) ==
- The first two seasons of The Red Green Show aired on CHCH-TV in Hamilton, Ontario. CHCH-TV had previously aired Steve Smith's variety shows Smith & Smith, Me & Max, and The Comedy Mill, in that order. Red Green was a recurring character on all three of those shows.

No. overall	No. in season	Title	Original release date
1	1	"The Big Inboard"	January 4, 1991
2	2	"The Elvis Sighting"	January 11, 1991
3	3	"The UFO"	January 18, 1991
4	4	"The Treasure Hunt"	January 25, 1991
5	5	"Practical Joke Week"	February 1, 1991
6	6	"Home Barber-Kit"	February 8, 1991
7	7	"He-Man Contest"	February 15, 1991
8	8	"Guest Elephant"	February 22, 1991
9	9	"Exotic Dancer"	March 1, 1991
10	10	"Lost Toupee"	March 8, 1991
11	11	"Talent Show"	March 15, 1991
12	12	"Problem Outhouse"	March 22, 1991
13	13	"Whittling Contest"	September 18, 1991
14	14	"Wind-Powered Boat"	October 23, 1991
15	15	"Hot Water Bottle"	November 20, 1991
16	16	"Lodge Visitor"	December 18, 1991
17	17	"Gun Powder and Salt and Pepper Shakers"	January 15, 1992
18	18	"Safety Week"	January 22, 1992
19	19	"Bad Chili"	January 29, 1992
20	20	"Water Tower"	February 5, 1992
21	21	"Jet Ski"	February 12, 1992
22	22	"New Well"	February 19, 1992
23	23	"Canoe Jousting"	February 26, 1992
24	24	"Water Slide"	March 4, 1992

== Season 2 (1992–1993) ==
- This was the last season of The Red Green Show to air on CHCH-TV. It was also the only season in which Bill Smith (Rick Green) was prominently featured as a lodge member, in addition to his appearances in the "Adventures with Bill" segments. During this season of The Red Green Show, a new format was introduced: the Lodge Meeting. In this format, the show was divided into segments, each of which focused on a different topic.

No. overall	No. in season	Title	Original release date
25	1	"The Putter Attack"	September 23, 1992
26	2	"Doc's Loan"	September 30, 1992
27	3	"The Missing Records"	October 7, 1992
28	4	"The Receipt-A-Thon"	October 14, 1992
29	5	"The Sing Along Machine"	October 21, 1992
30	6	"Bear!!!"	October 28, 1992
31	7	"The Bad Check-Up"	November 4, 1992
32	8	"The Four-Man Raft"	November 11, 1992
33	9	"Skeet Golf"	November 18, 1992
34	10	"The Broken Water Pump"	November 25, 1992
35	11	"The Illegal Clubs"	December 2, 1992
36	12	"Animals in the Attic"	December 9, 1992
37	13	"The Party Boat Sank"	December 16, 1992
38	14	"The Food Club"	December 23, 1992
39	15	"The Fish Locator"	December 30, 1992
40	16	"The Bent Canoe"	January 6, 1993
41	17	"Job Security"	January 13, 1993
42	18	"Noel's Stag"	January 20, 1993
43	19	"Bob's Birthday"	January 27, 1993
44	20	"The Sudsy Lake"	February 3, 1993
45	21	"The Gun Mishap"	February 10, 1993
46	22	"The Double Date"	February 17, 1993
47	23	"The Florida Trip"	February 24, 1993
48	24	"Not One Fish"	March 3, 1993

== Season 3 (1993–1994) ==
- Season 3 of The Red Green Show was the only season to air on CFPL-TV in London and YTV. This season marked a change in the show's wardrobe. Red and Harold began wearing red and green suspenders, and the badges were removed from their shirts.

No. overall	No. in season	Title	Original release date
49	1	"Maple Syrup"	September 22, 1993
50	2	"Car Pool"	September 29, 1993
51	3	"The Spawning Grounds"	October 6, 1993
52	4	"Magnetic Lake"	October 13, 1993
53	5	"Underground Parking"	October 20, 1993
54	6	"The Tanks We Get"	October 27, 1993
55	7	"Fire Brigade"	November 3, 1993
56	8	"The New Shirt/Casino"	November 10, 1993
57	9	"Green Green"	November 17, 1993
58	10	"Fuel Conversion"	November 24, 1993
59	11	"The Hidden Mine"	December 1, 1993
60	12	"Lake Regulations"	December 8, 1993
61	13	"Cross the Lake Race"	December 15, 1993
62	14	"The Salmon Parade"	December 22, 1993
63	15	"The Funniest Video"	December 29, 1993
64	16	"Biosphere Three"	January 5, 1994
65	17	"The Water Park"	January 12, 1994
66	18	"The Used Helicopter"	January 19, 1994
67	19	"Possum Lake Regatta"	January 26, 1994
68	20	"The Retirement Home"	February 2, 1994
69	21	"Slingshot Skiing"	February 9, 1994
70	22	"The Possum Olympics"	February 16, 1994
71	23	"Possum Lake Monster"	February 23, 1994
72	24	"The Water Show"	March 2, 1994

== Season 4 (1994–1995) ==
- Starting with episode 73, The Red Green Show moved to the Global Television Network and was renamed The New Red Green Show.

No. overall	No. in season	Title	Original release date
73	1	"The Beef Project"	September 24, 1994
74	2	"The Owl Project"	October 1, 1994
75	3	"The Beer Project"	October 8, 1994
76	4	"The Firewood Project"	October 15, 1994
77	5	"The Hydrogen Project"	October 22, 1994
78	6	"The Schoolhouse Project"	October 29, 1994
79	7	"The Firefly Project"	November 5, 1994
80	8	"The Badger Project"	November 12, 1994
81	9	"The Conveyor Project"	November 19, 1994
82	10	"The Electrical Project"	November 26, 1994
83	11	"The Storm Damage Project"	December 3, 1994
84	12	"The Marine Show Project"	December 10, 1994
85	13	"The Silver Project"	December 17, 1994
86	14	"The Ski & Golf Project"	December 24, 1994
87	15	"The Auction Project"	December 31, 1994
88	16	"The Rustproofing Project"	January 7, 1995
89	17	"The Movie Project"	January 14, 1995
90	18	"The Painted Leaves Project"	January 21, 1995
91	19	"The Real Estate Project"	January 28, 1995
92	20	"The Stuck Truck Project"	February 4, 1995
93	21	"The Group Photo Project"	February 11, 1995
94	22	"The Guard Dog Project"	February 18, 1995
95	23	"The Mt. Rushmore Project"	February 25, 1995
96	24	"The Catfish Project"	March 4, 1995

== Season 5 (1995–1996) ==
No. overall	No. in season	Title	Original release date
97	1	"Men's Night On The Mountain"	September 30, 1995
The men of Possum Lake have a night out on the mountain. Harold goes along and falls off the cliff. In Handyman Corner, Red turns a shopping cart into a combination recliner/pantry.
98	2	"The Driving Test"	October 7, 1995
99	3	"The Satellite Dish"	October 14, 1995
100	4	"Father and Son Banquet"	October 21, 1995
101	5	"The New Doctor"	October 28, 1995
102	6	"The Vertical Grandstand"	November 4, 1995
103	7	"The Network Deal"	November 11, 1995
104	8	"Medieval Times"	November 18, 1995
105	9	"Van Go"	November 25, 1995
106	10	"Possum Lodge Radio"	December 2, 1995
107	11	"X Marks The Spot"	December 9, 1995
108	12	"Sedgwick The Thief"	December 16, 1995
109	13	"The Cement Load"	December 23, 1995
110	14	"The Gas Shortage"	December 30, 1995
111	15	"Trout Season"	January 6, 1996
112	16	"The Lost Dog"	January 13, 1996
113	17	"The New Statue"	January 20, 1996
114	18	"One Man's Garbage"	January 27, 1996
115	19	"The Big Thing"	February 3, 1996
116	20	"Bottled Water"	February 10, 1996
117	21	"Floating Church"	February 17, 1996
118	22	"The Not-Chicken Franchise"	February 24, 1996
119	23	"The Compost Heap"	March 2, 1996
120	24	"Homemade Cheese"	March 9, 1996
Special (1)	25	"The Best of Red Green"	March 16, 1996

== Season 6 (1996–1997) ==
- Season 6 was the last season of The Red Green Show to air on the Global Television Network. After that, the show moved to CBC Television.

No. overall	No. in season	Title	Original release date
121	1	"The Science Fair"	September 30, 1996
122	2	"Sedgewick the Tenant"	October 7, 1996
123	3	"The Driving Lesson"	October 14, 1996
124	4	"The Tax Refund"	October 21, 1996
125	5	"No Church"	October 28, 1996
126	6	"The Petting Zoo"	November 4, 1996
127	7	"Good Government"	November 11, 1996
128	8	"The Poker Game"	November 18, 1996
129	9	"The Drill"	November 25, 1996
130	10	"Maxi Golf"	December 2, 1996
131	11	"Bernice's Birthday"	December 9, 1996
132	12	"The Church Casino"	December 16, 1996
133	13	"The House Raising"	December 23, 1996
134	14	"The Love Boat"	December 30, 1996
135	15	"The Girlfriend"	January 6, 1997
136	16	"The New Lease"	January 13, 1997
137	17	"The Baseball Tryouts"	January 20, 1997
138	18	"30 Minutes or Free"	January 27, 1997
139	19	"The Fund Raiser"	February 3, 1997
140	20	"Real Estate"	February 10, 1997
141	21	"The Stag Party"	February 17, 1997
142	22	"The Suits"	February 24, 1997
143	23	"The High School Reunion"	March 3, 1997
144	24	"Harold's Wheels"	March 10, 1997
Special (2)	25	"We Can't Help It, We're Men"	March 17, 1997

== Season 7 (1997-1998) ==
- The Red Green Show moved to CBC Television starting with this season, and it was the last season where was titled as The New Red Green Show. The show had previously aired on the Global Television Network in Seasons 4-6 (1994-1997).

No. overall	No. in season	Title	Original release date
145	1	"Running of the Bulls"	-
146	2	"Swiss It Up"	-
147	3	"The Implosion"	-
148	4	"Adopt-a-Highway"	-
149	5	"The Strange Ranger"	-
150	6	"Big Guy Little Guy"	-
151	7	"The Movie"	-
152	8	"Expropriation"	-
153	9	"The Stool Pigeons"	-
154	10	"Celebrity"	-
155	11	"Let Me Count the Ways"	-
156	12	"Pardi Gras"	-
157	13	"The Splinter Lodge"	-
158	14	"The Good Old Hockey Game"	-
159	15	"Step Outside"	-
160	16	"The Town Mall"	-
161	17	"The Winter Carnival"	-
Special (3)	18	"Of Cars and Men"	-

== Season 8 (1998-1999) ==
- Starting with this season, the show's title reverted back to The Red Green Show, and remained that way until the end of the show's run.
- This is also the last season where Harold (Patrick McKenna) introduced Red at the beginning of each episode, which had been used since Season 1.

No. overall	No. in season	Title	Original release date
162	1	"Harold's Leaving"	-
163	2	"House Moving"	-
164	3	"Neither Rain Nor Sleet"	-
165	4	"The Cult Visit"	-
166	5	"College Life"	-
167	6	"The New Monument"	-
168	7	"Free Apricots"	-
169	8	"The Mayor Race"	-
170	9	"Better To Give Than Receive"	-
171	10	"Town Services Contract"	-
172	11	"Life Cycle"	-
173	12	"Mad About You"	-
174	13	"Bingo Was His Name"	-
175	14	"It's A Wonderful Red Green Christmas"	-

== Season 9 (1999-2000) ==
- This season, the primary star of The Red Green Show, Harold Green, played by Patrick McKenna, had reduced screen time. In the story, Harold got a job in the city, and Red would visit him briefly in his office from time to time.
- At the start of each episode, Harold would introduce Red. Starting with this season, Harold no longer did this, so Red walked into the lodge with no announcement for the rest of the show's run. Segments that Harold hosted prior to this season, such as the "Possum Lodge Word Game" and "The Experts," were now hosted by Mike Hamar, Dalton Humphrey, and Winston Rothschild III.
- Rick Green, who played Bill Smith on The Red Green Show, left the series for four years. While he was gone, the "Adventures with Bill" segment continued with Walter (Joel Harris) and with Mike, Dalton, and Winston, and was simply called "Adventures."
- That season, a new segment called "Life and Times" was introduced. Red narrated the segment in a documentary style, which featured biographies of past residents of Possum Lake. The segment continued until Season 10.

No. overall	No. in season	Title	Original release date
176	1	"Harold's Job"	-
177	2	"The Fishing Derby"	-
178	3	"Lady in Red"	-
179	4	"The Bachelor Auction"	-
180	5	"Angel"	-
181	6	"School Bus Blimp"	-
182	7	"Coup De Grass"	-
183	8	"Rent A Wreck"	-
184	9	"Curse of the Mummy"	-
185	10	"Roll Out the Barrels"	-
186	11	"No Retreat"	-
187	12	"The Battle Call"	-
188	13	"Hurricane Doug"	-
189	14	"Guinness World Records"	-
190	15	"The Auto Club"	-
191	16	"Too Much Information"	-
192	17	"A Very Merry Red Green Christmas"	-
Special (4)	18	"Red's Guide To Parenting"	-

== Season 10 (2000-2001) ==
- Season 10 of The Red Green Show was the only season where Harold Green did not appear onscreen. Harold Green was absent when he left for a job in Port Asbestos.

No. overall	No. in season	Title	Original release date
193	1	"Sausage Envy"	-
194	2	"Foster Child"	-
195	3	"What a Dump"	-
196	4	"Winston's Wedding"	-
197	5	"Man of the Year"	-
198	6	"Survivor"	-
199	7	"Historic Site"	-
200	8	"Twinning"	-
201	9	"Lunar Eclipse"	-
202	10	"Barter Starter"	-
203	11	"Out of the Woods"	-
204	12	"Cheap Jeep"	-
205	13	"DNA All the Way"	-
206	14	"Who Wants to be a Smart Guy"	-
207	15	"The Beaver Dam"	-
208	16	"The Dandruff Foundation"	-
209	17	"Damn You Emu"	-
210	18	"No Duct Tape"	-

== Season 11 (2001–2002) ==
- Harold Green returned to the series in a sporadic form.

No. overall	No. in season	Title	Original release date
211	1	"New Job in Town"	October 12, 2001
212	2	"Gladiator"	October 19, 2001
213	3	"The Whooping Crane"	October 26, 2001
214	4	"Back to Nature"	November 2, 2001
215	5	"Dalton's Hot Gift"	November 9, 2001
216	6	"Viva Las Possums"	November 16, 2001
217	7	"Y2 Cans"	November 23, 2001
218	8	"The Ghost of Possum Lodge"	November 30, 2001
219	9	"The Chainsaw Races"	December 7, 2001
220	10	"Something in the Heir"	December 14, 2001
221	11	"Daredevil"	December 21, 2001
222	12	"Mike Goes Straight"	December 28, 2001
223	13	"Xmas in July"	January 4, 2002
224	14	"The Fishing Derby"	January 11, 2002
225	15	"Masquerade Marathon"	March 1, 2002
226	16	"Harold's Dilemma"	January 18, 2002
227	17	"Red Green Does New Years"	January 25, 2002
Special (5)	18	"The Making of Red Green's Duct Tape Forever"	March 8, 2002
Film	19	"Duct Tape Forever"	April 12, 2002

== Season 12 (2002–2003) ==
No. overall	No. in season	Title	Original release date
228	1	"Go Fish"	October 18, 2002
229	2	"The Possum Ponderosa"	October 25, 2002
230	3	"Possum Air"	November 1, 2002
231	4	"The IQ Test"	November 8, 2002
232	5	"The Day of the Sunflowers"	November 15, 2002
233	6	"Reality Television"	November 22, 2002
234	7	"Possum Lodge Provincial Park"	November 29, 2002
235	8	"The Silver Wasp"	December 6, 2002
236	9	"A Lot Like Christmas"	December 13, 2002
237	10	"Snowed In"	December 20, 2002
238	11	"The Go Go Bars"	December 27, 2002
239	12	"The Missile Crisis"	January 3, 2003
240	13	"Never Send a Man"	January 10, 2003
241	14	"Power Struggle"	January 17, 2003
242	15	"Mr. Possum Lake"	January 24, 2003
243	16	"Red and Breakfast"	January 31, 2003
244	17	"The Moosetrap"	February 7, 2003
245	18	"Stupid Cupid"	February 14, 2003

== Season 13 (2003–2004) ==
- After a four-year absence, Bill Smith, played by Rick Green, returns to The Red Green Show.
- The season finale of The Red Green Show introduces Bonnie Green. Bonnie is Harold's girlfriend, and in the final season, they get married.
- This is Ranger Gord's, played by Peter Keleghan, last season.

No. overall	No. in season	Title	Original release date
246	1	"You've Got Oil"	October 24, 2003
247	2	"The Drive-Thru"	October 31, 2003
248	3	"School Demo"	November 7, 2003
249	4	"Change Will Do You Good"	November 14, 2003
250	5	"The Earring"	November 21, 2003
251	6	"Mailbox Wars"	November 28, 2003
252	7	"The String Ball"	December 5, 2003
253	8	"The Spelling Bee"	December 12, 2003
254	9	"Pay It Forward"	January 2, 2004
255	10	"Possum Day"	January 9, 2004
256	11	"The Boat Ramp"	January 16, 2004
257	12	"Comrade Harold"	January 23, 2004
258	13	"Spokesman Red"	January 30, 2004
259	14	"The Chain Letter"	February 6, 2004
260	15	"The Women's Circle"	February 13, 2004
261	16	"Ranger Harold"	February 20, 2004
262	17	"The Sinkhole"	February 27, 2004
263	18	"Cyber Girl"	March 5, 2004
Special (6)	19	"Hindsight Is 20/20"	March 10, 2004

== Season 14 (2004–2005) ==
No. overall	No. in season	Title	Original release date
264	1	"Red's Hot Sauce"	October 1, 2004
265	2	"Life Is a Circus"	October 8, 2004
266	3	"Once More to the Well"	October 15, 2004
267	4	"The Statue"	October 22, 2004
268	5	"False Idol"	November 7, 2004
269	6	"Harold's One and Only"	November 12, 2004
270	7	"The Grapes of Wrath"	November 19, 2004
271	8	"The Lodge Election"	November 26, 2004
272	9	"Ticket to Fame"	December 3, 2004
273	10	"Stay Tuned"	December 10, 2004
274	11	"The Butter Man"	December 17, 2004
275	12	"Red Green Insurance"	January 14, 2005
276	13	"Lodge Luau"	January 21, 2005
277	14	"Hoard of the Flies"	January 28, 2005
278	15	"A Shot in the Dark"	February 4, 2005
279	16	"Bye Bye Bonnie"	February 11, 2005
280	17	"Fishy CanUSA Games"	February 18, 2005
281	18	"The Possum Drop"	February 25, 2005

== Season 15 (2005–2006) ==
- The final season of The Red Green Show centers around Harold and Bonnie's wedding. Harold is preparing for the big day, and Bonnie is planning the wedding of her dreams.

No. overall	No. in season	Title	Original release date
282	1	"Rules of Engagement"	November 11, 2005
283	2	"The Folk Art Convention"	November 18, 2005
284	3	"Mr. Clean"	November 25, 2005
285	4	"No Tell Boatel"	December 2, 2005
286	5	"Cell Hell"	December 9, 2005
287	6	"Cart Blanche"	December 16, 2005
288	7	"New Yorkshire Puddings"	December 23, 2005
289	8	"Exit Stag Right"	December 30, 2005
290	9	"Mad You Say?"	January 6, 2006
291	10	"No Place Like the Home"	January 13, 2006
292	11	"Flying Blind"	January 20, 2006
293	12	"The Bigger the Better"	January 27, 2006
294	13	"The Big Retreat"	February 3, 2006
295	14	"Rites of Passage"	March 3, 2006
296	15	"Sasquatch"	March 10, 2006
297	16	"Rain Man"	March 17, 2006
298	17	"Love Is in the Air"	March 24, 2006
299	18	"Toe the Line"	March 31, 2006
300	19	"Do as I Do"	April 7, 2006
