= S&S Productions =

S&S Productions is a Canadian television production company. The firm grew out of Smith & Smith, a sketch comedy series starring the married comedy duo of Steve and Morag Smith, and also produced their subsequent series Me & Max, The Comedy Mill and The Red Green Show. The firm was established by the Smiths, along with Steve Smith's brother David as an additional partner.

Following the success of The Red Green Show in the early 1990s, the firm branched out to produce other entertainment and informational programming not directly starring the duo. The company also produced Duct Tape Forever, a feature film spinoff of Red Green, but remains focused on television rather than film production.

== Produced by S&S ==
- An American in Canada
- Anything I Can Do
- Balance: Television for Living Well
- The Comedy Mill
- The 5th Quadrant
- Gardener's Journal
- History Bites
- Jeff Ltd.
- listen missy!
- Me & Max
- Men on Women
- The Red Green Show
- Smith & Smith
- Sons of Butcher
- Steve Smith Playhouse
- Street Eats
- Supertown Challenge
