= List of programs broadcast by Comedy Gold =

This is a list of television programs formerly broadcast by the defunct Canadian television channel Comedy Gold and its previous incarnation as TV Land Canada.

This is a list of programs that were broadcast as of 2018.

== Final programming ==
=== A–E ===
- Adam Ruins Everything (2018–2019)
- Anger Management (2018–2019)
- Comedy Bang! Bang! (2018–2019)
- Comedy Now! (2015–2019)
- Community (2018–2019)
- Corner Gas (2015–2019)
- Everybody Hates Chris (2018–2019)

=== F–J ===
- The First Family (2018–2019)
- Fameless (2018–2019)
- Impastor (2018–2019)
- The Jim Gaffigan Show (2018–2019)

=== K–O ===
- Mr. Box Office (2018–2019)

=== P–T ===
- Ridiculousness (2018–2019)
- Spun Out (2017–2019)
- Tosh.0 (2018–2019)

== Past ==
=== 0–9 ===
- 21 Jump Street (2005–2009)

=== A–E ===
- The Addams Family (2003–2005)
- Adderly (2003–2009)
- Adventures in Rainbow Country (2006–2008)
- Airwaves (2001–2003)
- The Andy Griffith Show (2008–2011)
- The Beachcombers
- Bizarre (2008–2011)
- Cannon (2001–2007)
- Car 54, Where Are You? (2002–2004)
- Check It Out! (2001–2006, 2011–2013)
- Comedy Bang! Bang! (2018)
- The Comedy Mill
- Coming Up Rosie (2001–2006)
- Dallas (2002–2009)
- Dan for Mayor (2017–present)
- The David Steinberg Show (30-minute 1976 version) (2011–2017)
- Designing Women (2010–2012)
- Diff'rent Strokes (2002–2003)

=== F–J ===
- F Troop (2003–2010)
- The F.B.I. (2002–2018)
- The Facts of Life (2002–2004)
- Family Affair (2001–2003)
- Family Feud (2014–2016)
- Family Matters (2008–2013)
- Family Ties (2002–2005)
- Fantasy Island (2007–2010)
- Father Knows Best (2002–2003)
- Fernwood 2 Night (2001–2002)
- The Flip Wilson Show (2006–2008)
- The Flying Nun (2002–2003)
- Fonz and the Happy Days Gang (2003–2010)
- Frasier (2008–2012)
- The Fresh Prince of Bel-Air (2004–2013)
- Friends (2013–2015)
- The Fugitive (2001–2017)
- Full House (2006–2009)
- George Lopez (2016)
- Get Smart (2001–2005)
- Gilligan's Island (2001–2017)
- Gimme a Break! (2002–2009)
- Gomer Pyle, U.S.M.C. (2003–2009)
- Good Times (2006–2015)
- Grace Under Fire (2008–2009)
- Grady (2002–2003)
- Green Acres (2001–2002)
- Growing Pains (2006–2009)
- Happy Days (2003–2010)
- Have Gun, Will Travel (2002–2006)
- Harlem Globetrotters (2004–2005)
- Hawaii Five-O (2001–2005)
- Hazel (2002–2003)
- Here Comes the Grump (1997–1999)
- Heckle and Jeckle (2004–2005)
- Highway to Heaven (2001–2009)
- Hill Street Blues (2004–2007)
- Hogan's Heroes (2008–2015)
- Home Improvement (2010–2013)
- Honey West (2003–2004)
- Hong Kong Phooey (1999)
- The Honeymooners (2004–2007)
- How I Met Your Mother (2015–2019)
- H.R. Pufnstuf (2004–2005)
- Hunter (2004–2007)
- I Dream of Jeannie (2001–2006)
- I Love Lucy (2001–2014)
- In the Heat of the Night (2005–2008)
- Ironside (2001–2007)
- It Takes a Thief (2003–2014)
- It's a Living (2004–2006)
- The Jeffersons (2002–2012)
- Julia (2002–2007)
- Just Shoot Me (2012–2014)

=== K–O ===
- The Kids in the Hall (2001–2004, 2010–2017)
- King of Kensington (2003–2008)
- Lassie (2001–2004, 2006–2010)
- Love, American Style (2007–2010)
- The Love Boat (2001–2002)
- MacGyver (2001–2002)
- Mama's Family (2003–2012)
- The Mary Tyler Moore Show (2005–2008, 2010–2017)
- Match Game (CBS incarnation) (2012–2016)
- Miami Vice (2002–2009)
- The Millionaire (2002–2005)
- Murphy Brown (2010–2013)
- My Three Sons (2001–2006)
- The New Lassie (2005–2007)
- The New Addams Family (2013–2016)
- Newhart (2010–2017)
- Night Court (2010–2017)
- The Odd Couple (2016–2017)
- One Day at a Time (2011–2013)

=== P–T ===
- Peep Show (2001–2005)
- Perry Mason (2001–2006)
- Petticoat Junction (2006–2010)
- The Phil Silvers Show (2008–2010)
- Ready or Not (2008–2010)
- The Red Green Show (2009–2017)
- Rhoda (2001–2005, 2011–2017)
- Sanford and Son (2002–2004)
- SCTV (2002–2003, 2010–2017)
- Sister, Sister (2006–2011)
- Smith & Smith (2005–2008)
- Soap (2011–2013)
- The Super Dave Osborne Show (2011–2015)
- Swiss Family Robinson (2006–2008)
- Trapper John, M.D. (2001–2003)

=== U–Z ===
- Veranda Beach Comedy Club (2007–2010)
- Who's the Boss? (2011–2014)
- Wings (August 5, 2013 – 2017)
- Wiseguy (2006–2009)
