= Jeff Lumby =

Canadian actor

- Born: Toronto, Ontario, Canada
- Occupation: Actor
- Years active: 1980–present

Jeff Lumby is a Canadian actor, whose family created and produced the 1980s Canadian children's television series, Size Small, where he performed as various characters and a puppeteer. Lumby played "Winston Rothschild III", the septic tank and sewer technician character on The Red Green Show and Duct Tape Forever.

== Career ==
Lumby is involved in Skatoony on Teletoon. Skatoony, which was originally developed in the UK, debuted in Canada in 2010. Jeff voices one of the new additions to the North American version, studio executive and producer, Charles La Puck. Jeff has provided animated voices to many projects over the years, including the Mad scientist role of Professor Tomoe in the Cloverway dub adaptation of the Sailor Moon anime series in season three; his sister, Lisa Lumby-Richards (who appeared on Size Small as "Grandma Gussie"), was a screenwriter for the adaptation.

For eight years, he was a radio personality on Hamilton, Ontario station CJXY-FM, the rock station that was then Y95.3. He subsequently co-hosted the morning show on Toronto country radio station CISS-FM prior to its 1999 flip to contemporary hit radio. In January 2007, he returned to radio as lead morning host of radio station CJDV-FM, 107.5 Dave FM, a Corus Entertainment Radio Station broadcasting from the Tri-Cities of Cambridge/Kitchener/Waterloo, Ontario. He has since left.

On July 5, 2010, Lumby became the interim morning show host on sports radio station The FAN 590 in Toronto after the station fired its long running morning show duo of Don Landry and former Toronto Maple Leafs General Manager Gord Stellick. He hosted on an interim basis until a permanent replacement for Landry & Stellick was found. Andrew Krystal was later named the eventual replacement as host for the FAN 590's morning show.

In April 2012, Lumby joined the "New Kool Morning Crew", heard on 105.3 Kool FM in Kitchener/Waterloo.

== Filmography ==
=== Live action roles ===
Year	Title	Role	Notes
1980–82	SCTV	Guest roles	
1982–83	Size Small	Tex	
1983	Size Small Country	Stampede	
1986	Size Small Island	Stampede	
1994–2004	The Red Green Show	Winston Rothschild III	
2002	Duct Tape Forever	Winston Rothschild III	
2005	The Perfect Man	Dr. Pitch	
2006	Uncle Joe's Cartoon Playhouse	Various characters	

=== Voice over roles ===
Year	Title	Role	Notes
1990–91	The Little Flying Bears	Jason	
1992–94	Keroppi and Friends	Junk, Nelson ("The Frog's Secret House")	English dub
1995	Sailor Moon	Misha	DiC English dub
2000	Sailor Moon S: The Movie	Kakeru Oozora	CWi/Pioneer English dub
2000	Sailor Moon S	Professor/Doctor Souichi Tomoe, Germatoid and Master Pharaoh 90	CWi English dub
2003–05	King	Various characters	
2004–11	Peep and the Big Wide World	Raccoon	
2004–07	Odd Job Jack	Various characters	
2005	6teen	Star Idol Judge	
2005–06	Sons of Butcher	Various characters	
2006	Time Warp Trio	Liphdinise	
2007–09	Ricky Sprocket: Showbiz Boy	Leonard Sprocket	
2007–08	Wayside	Various characters	
2008–09	Best Ed	Various characters	
2010–13	Skatoony	Charles La Puck	
2010–13	Sidekick	Various characters	
2012–15	Fugget About It	Terry	
2013-16	Grojband	Various characters	
2015	George of the Jungle	Narrator	Season 2
2016	Looped	Various characters	
2017	Wishfart	G	
