= Duct Tape Forever =

2002 Canadian comedy film

- Directed by: Eric Till
- Written by: Steve Smith
- Starring: Steve Smith; Patrick McKenna; Wayne Robson; Bob Bainborough; Graham Greene; Jeff Lumby; Jerry Schaefer
- Cinematography: Philip Earnshaw
- Edited by: T.C. Martin; Dean Soltys
- Music by: Glenn Morley
- Production company: S&S Productions
- Distributed by: Red Sky Entertainment
- Release date: April 12, 2002
- Running time: 90 minutes
- Country: Canada
- Language: English

Duct Tape Forever is a 2002 Canadian comedy film based on The Red Green Show. It was written by Steve Smith, the actor who plays Red Green.

== Plot ==
When property developer Robert Stiles' limousine gets stuck in a sinkhole on the Possum Lodge grounds, Red Green and his friends try to pull it loose but end up sending it into the lake instead, leading Stiles to sue them. The presiding judge levies a $10,000 fine that must be paid within 30 days, or else ownership of the Lodge will revert to the town of Possum Lake. Red's nephew Harold pleads for the judge to reconsider her decision; she responds by reducing the deadline from 30 days to 10.

As the Lodge members try to think of ways to raise the money, Harold learns of an upcoming duct tape sculpture contest, sponsored by 3M and being held in Minnesota. The third-place award is $10,000, which the men feel they have a chance to win. They construct a giant goose using scrounged materials and hundreds of rolls of tape, and Red, Harold, and Dalton Humphrey set off for the contest, towing it on a trailer behind the Possum Van.

Tompkins, the sheriff of Possum Lake, and his deputy Dawn follow the trio, having been recruited by Stiles to prevent them from reaching the contest. Dawn becomes inexplicably smitten with Harold, who is attracted to Dalton's indifferent daughter Mandy. Tompkins and Dawn let the air out of the Possum Van's tires, only to find that Dalton has siphoned all the gasoline out of their cruiser, temporarily stranding them. Later, after Red has sent Dalton back to the Lodge to get help and find evidence of Stiles' plans, Tompkins digs a trench across the road with a backhoe. Red points out that the cruiser is on the opposite side from the Possum Van, so Tompkins tries to lift the cruiser across the trench but accidentally drops it in, allowing Red and Harold to drive over it as a makeshift bridge and continue toward the contest.

Fed up with Tompkins' incompetence, Stiles dismisses him and Dawn and kidnaps Harold, planning to trade him for the goose. Stiles blames the Lodge for ruining his mother's life, as his father habitually went there to avoid every crisis in the family, and ascribes his drive for success to her frustration over this behavior. He intends to buy the Lodge from the town and convert it to a resort for women only.

Red and the Lodge members arrange to meet Stiles and his workers at noon on the following day to make the exchange. Once Harold is free, he and Red flee with the goose in the Possum Van while the other Lodge members steal the cars used by Stiles' men. As Red and Harold approach the contest, they find Stiles and his men chasing them in the bus left behind by the Lodge members. A can of gasoline dumped on the road by Harold ignites due to an errant gunshot from the bus, creating an explosion that launches the goose off its trailer and onto the contest site. It lands neatly atop a model of the CN Tower and is awarded third place, winning the $10,000 needed to pay the fine and keep the Lodge out of Stiles' hands.

During a victory celebration back at the Lodge, Red honors Harold's quick thinking by making him a lifetime charter member and giving him a Lodge vest, not revealing that its back is marked with the word "DOOFUS." Stiles and his mother reconcile, and Dawn beckons Harold outside and kisses him passionately as Edgar K.B. Montrose brings in a cake whose candles he has inadvertently switched for sticks of dynamite. Everyone flees just before these explode, severely damaging the building and prompting Red to ask if anyone has some duct tape to repair it.

== Cast ==
- Steve Smith as Red Green
- Patrick McKenna as Harold Green
- Bob Bainborough as Dalton Humphrey
- Wayne Robson as Mike Hamar
- Jeff Lumby as Winston Rothschild III
- Jerry Schaefer as Ed Frid
- Richard Fitzpatrick as Robert Stiles
- Graham Greene as Edgar K.B. Montrose
- Dave Broadfoot as Mountie
- Peter Keleghan as Ranger Gord
- Lawrence Dane as Prosecutor
- Darren Frost as Sheriff Tompkins
- Melissa DiMarco as Deputy Dawn

Roger Abbott, Don Ferguson, Luba Goy, and John Morgan from Royal Canadian Air Farce have a cameo as their characters from the "A Canadian Moment" segments on Air Farce. George Buza, who plays marina owner Dwight Cardiff on The Red Green Show, has a cameo as a motel manager.

== Reception ==
On Rotten Tomatoes, the film has an aggregate score of 30% based on 3 positive and 7 negative critic reviews.
