= Steve Smith Playhouse =

- Genre: Comedy
- Narrated by: Steve Smith
- Country of origin: Canada
- Original language: English

Production
- Running time: 30 minutes

Original release
- Release: 2004 – 2004

Steve Smith Playhouse is a Canadian English language television series. It was produced by S&S Productions and debuted in 2004.

The series consisted of 13 half-hour episodes hosted, written and directed by Canadian actor and comedian Steve Smith. In each episode Smith takes one specific B-movie from the 1950s or 1960s, condenses them to a half-hour and uses his voice to replace that of the lead character, while all the other characters’ performances remain untouched, often changing the plot and tone of the original movie.

== Broadcasters ==
- Space - original broadcaster
- Drive-In Classics - secondary broadcaster (reruns)
