= Size Small =

Canadian children's music album/television series

- Starring: Helen Lumby; John Lumby Jr. Jeff Lumby; Lisa Lumby-Richards
- Country of origin: Canada
- No. of episodes: 65

Production
- Executive producer: Stan Thomas
- Running time: 26:50

Original release
- Network: CKND-TV
- Release: 1982 – 1986

Size Small is a Canadian children's music album series, turned television series, first produced in 1980. Written by and starring the Lumby family, characters included Miss Helen (played by Helen Lumby), Oliver (John Lumby Jr.), Grandma Gussie (Lisa Lumby-Richards), Stampede (Jeff Lumby), and Friend Record, a giant record who plays the spoons. Other characters included puppets such as Hatchet (a beaver), Renfrew (a dog), Gasper (a skunk), Gifford (a gopher), Cooter (a coyote), Casablanca (a cow) and the triplets Webster, Dee Dee and Tug. Size Small is based on a predecessor series, Miss Helen's Kindergarten Party, airing from 1956 to 1962 on CFQC-TV in Saskatoon, Saskatchewan.

Friend Record from an episode of Size Small Island.

The television series, launched in 1982, was a huge hit in Canada and around the world; it also aired on some PBS member stations in the United States, at least during 1987. Spin-offs included Size Small Country (1983) and Size Small Island (1986). A Size Small Christmas special was also produced in 1984.

Size Small was produced in Saskatoon, Saskatchewan through the Winnipeg, Manitoba television station CKND-TV, later involving the Global Television Network and Saskatchewan stations CFRE-TV and CFSK-TV.

A series of Size Small records were produced, featuring songs performed on the show. They were advertised at the end of every episode of the TV show, where they could be purchased by mail order.

The show re-aired on YTV in the early 1990s, with advertisements for the records removed.
