= Patrick McKenna =

Canadian comedian and actor (born 1960)

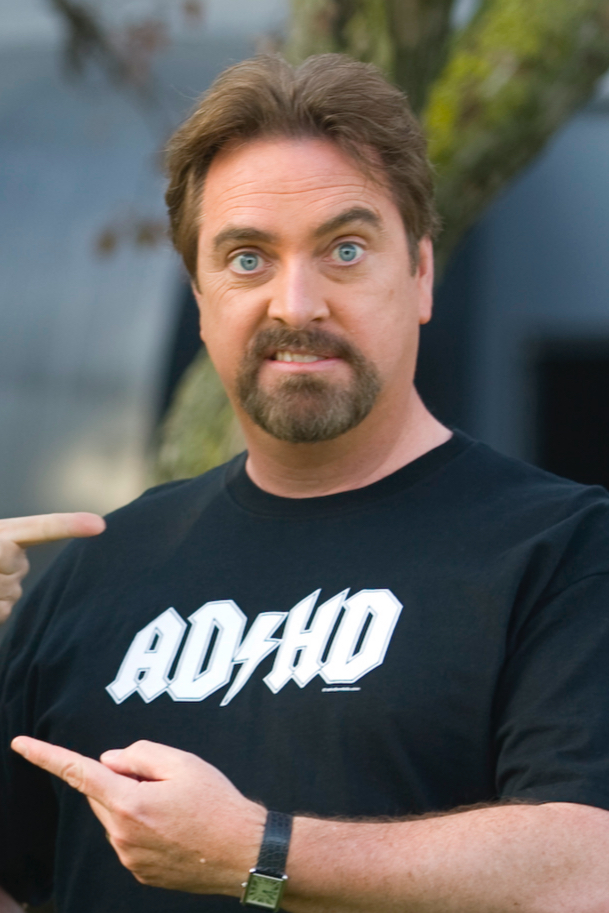
- McKenna in 2009
- Born: May 8, 1960 (age 66); Hamilton, Ontario, Canada
- Occupations: Comedian, actor
- Years active: 1980s–present
- Spouse: Janis McKenna (m. 1983)
- Children: 1
- Website: http://www.PatrickMcKenna.ca

Patrick McKenna (born May 8, 1960) is a Canadian comedian and actor. He is best known for playing Harold Green on the television series The Red Green Show and Marty Stevens on the television series Traders.

== Early life ==
McKenna was born in Hamilton, Ontario, the second of four sons to Patricia (née Corneau) and Ivan McKenna, a carpenter. He became interested in Second City when a high-school teacher took him to a show at Second City Toronto. After he graduated from high school, he attended Sheridan College, graduating with a business degree in 1982.

== Career ==
To help with tuition, McKenna worked his way to being night manager at Second City, learning how improv worked. In 1983, he auditioned successfully for the main stage. During the 1980s, McKenna tried his hand at stand-up and spent five years performing his act in Canada and the United States.

One night at Second City during the late 1980s, McKenna received the acting offer which would change his life. Steve Smith was recruiting cast members, especially a sidekick, for his new project, The Red Green Show. He had come to Second City and was checking out the entire troupe, but when Patrick did his twitchy-nerd character, Smith knew he had his sidekick. He offered McKenna a job after the show. McKenna appeared on television screens throughout Canada and the US for the next 15 years as the lovable nephew Harold Green on The Red Green Show, a part he would reprise in the feature film Duct Tape Forever.

He also played Marty Stephens on Traders, working alongside future Stargate SG-1 and Stargate Atlantis Canadian actor David Hewlett. For his work on Traders and The Red Green Show, McKenna received two Gemini Awards. He is the only Canadian actor to win for both drama and comedy in the same year, at the 13th Gemini Awards on 4 October 1998.

McKenna guest-starred in two episodes of Stargate SG-1 playing Dr. Jay Felger, first in the season 6 episode "The Other Guys" and then in the season 7 episode "Avenger 2.0". He also starred in the 2002 Trudeau miniseries.

In 2006, McKenna played producer Jeffrey Littleman on the short-lived CBC television series Getting Along Famously. In 2007, he appeared in the pilot of Sabbatical. He starred as Victor in the 2011 indie horror film Silent but Deadly. In late 2011, he played the politician and Canadian Confederation leader Alexander Galt in the CBC television movie John A: Birth of a Country. Throughout the mid-2000s and early 2010s, McKenna saw work as a voice actor in Canadian animated series such as Atomic Betty, Iggy Arbuckle, Crash Canyon and Sidekick.

McKenna was the subject of the 2009 PBS documentary ADD and Loving It?! McKenna has ADHD, but was not diagnosed until he was well into his forties. He has become somewhat of a spokesman on this condition in Canada. McKenna and Rick Green, writer and performer and co-creator of The Red Green Show, made a documentary to explain some of ADHD's positives and negatives titled "ADD and Loving It." Both men open up about how it has affected them and their relationships.

== Charitable work ==
McKenna has become involved with many charity organizations and causes including wheelchair athletes, Adult ADHD, MS Society, Lupus Canada, and McMaster Sick Kids—some of which he has personal connection with.

McKenna suffered a debilitating back injury in the early 2000s that left him unable to walk for a year. He went through times of being in a wheelchair and having to learn to walk again. It was from this experience that he became involved with wheelchair athletes.

His mother has suffered from lupus since the 1970s. McKenna's friend and fellow Second City alumnus Colin Mochrie and his wife Debra McGrath often help him with lupus charity fundraising.

== Filmography ==
This is a partial filmography for Patrick McKenna.

=== Television ===
- The Red Green Show (Harold Green)
- Traders (Marty Stephens)
- Little Mosque on the Prairie (The Principal)
- Stargate SG-1 (2 eps.) (Dr. Jay Felger)
- Due South ("Pizzas and Promises", season 1, ep. 5) (Gary Redfield)
- Getting Along Famously (Jeffrey Littleman)
- The Border (Don Campbell)
- Bill 'n' Lloyd (Krasky the Klown)
- Wingin' It (Mr. Telson)
- The Outer Limits (episode "Mindreacher") (Dr. Seigal)
- Remedy (Frank Kanaskie)
- Forever Knight ("Dance by the Light of the Moon", season 1, ep. 5)
- Everywhere (Jim)
- Rick Mercer Report
- The Ron James Show
- Murdoch Mysteries (recurring) (Detective/ Inspector Hamish Slorach)
- Robocop: The Series (1994) (Umberto Ortega, Talk Show Host)
- Pink Is In (Colonel Kwoka) (4 episodes)
- Hard Rock Medical (2014-2018) (Dr. Frazer Healy)
- One Man's Treasure (2023-2025) (Bobby)
- The Trades (2024- ) (Rodd)

==== Animated television and film (voices) ====
- The Adventures of Sam & Max: Freelance Police (Lorne, the Friend for Life)
- Big Teeth, Bad Breath (Simon)
- Moville Mysteries (Victor's father)
- JoJo's Circus (Seltzy)
- Atomic Betty (Quincy Barrett)
- Gerald McBoing-Boing (Gerald's father)
- Iggy Arbuckle (Robear)
- Best Ed (Doug aka Buddy)
- Detective Squirrel Jr. (Dad)
- Bob & Doug (Dennis)
- Spliced ("Two-Legs" Joe)
- Clang Invasion (Rivet)
- Sidekick (Pamplemoose)
- Scaredy Squirrel (Nestor)
- Crash Canyon (Norm Wendell / Vernon Wendell / Coma Steve / Bobby Joe)
- The Day My Butt Went Psycho! (Various characters)
- Stories from My Childhood (Various characters)
- The ZhuZhus (Wilfred P. Kerdle)
- Cloudy with a Chance of Meatballs (Gil, Manny)
- Mysticons (King Darius; supporting role)
- Esme & Roy (Roy)
- Dino Raiders (Uncle Jack)
- Go, Dog. Go! (Grandpaw Barker)

=== Films ===
- Duct Tape Forever (Harold)
- Milo 55160 (Milo 55160)
- John A.: Birth of a Country (TV movie) (Alexander Galt)
- The Masked Saint (Judd Lumpkin)
- Silent But Deadly (Victor)
- Margarita (Ben)
- The Music Man (2003 film) (TV movie remake) (Anvil salesman Charlie Cowell)
- Everywhere (2014) (Jim)
- Redder (2023) (Murderer)
- Magnetosphere (2025) (Russell Campion)

=== Radio ===
- The Debaters (recurring)
