= Peter Keleghan =

Canadian actor and writer (born 1959)

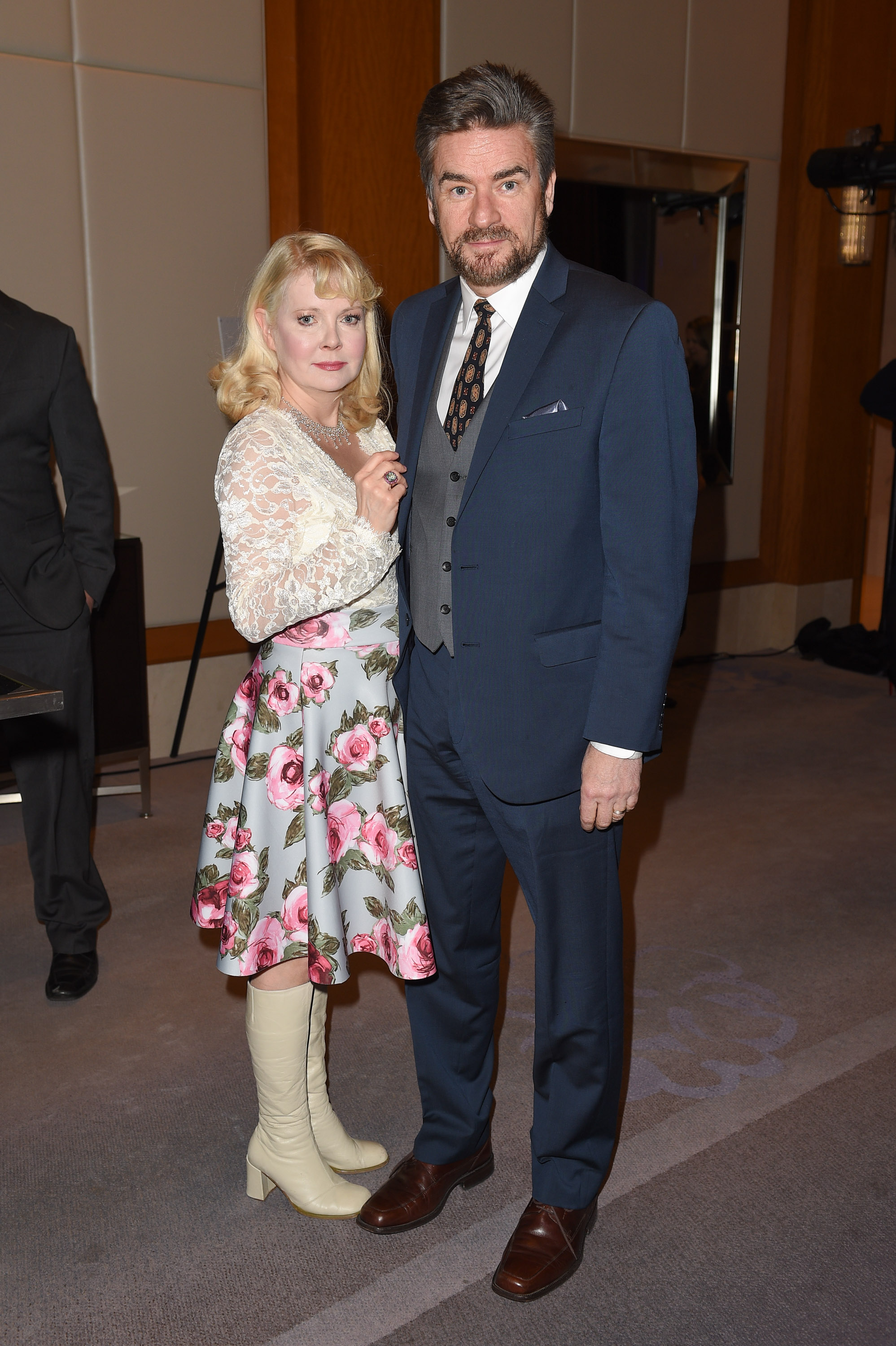
- Keleghan with his wife Leah Pinsent in 2017
- Born: September 16, 1959 (age 67); Montreal, Quebec, Canada
- Occupations: Actor, writer
- Years active: 1983–present
- Spouse: Leah Pinsent

Peter Keleghan (born September 16, 1959) is a Canadian actor and writer, known for portraying Ben Bellow in the comedy series 18 to Life, Clark Claxton Sr. in the comedy series Billable Hours and Ranger Gord in The Red Green Show. Since 2008, he has a recurring role on Murdoch Mysteries as government agent/spy Terrence Meyers.

== Early life ==
Keleghan was born in Montreal, Quebec. He earned his BA in English Drama from York University in Toronto, Ontario.

== Career ==
Keleghan has had a long career in film and television, mostly in comedic roles starting in the Smith & Smith spin off comedy sketch show, Comedy Mill. His best-known roles have been film industry CEO Alan Roy on Made in Canada, news anchor Jim Walcott on The Newsroom, Ranger Gord on The Red Green Show, Ben Bellow on 18 to Life and special agent Terrence Myers on Murdoch Mysteries. His other television performances include Seinfeld, and Queer as Folk.

Some of his film work includes Picture Perfect, Ginger Snaps, Eating Buccaneers and GravyTrain. Kelghan has also provided the voice of Scaredy Bat, a character in the animated series Ruby Gloom.

In 2009, Keleghan was awarded the ACTRA Award of Excellence in recognition of his body of work.

== Personal life ==
Keleghan is married to actress Leah Pinsent.

== Filmography ==
Year	Title	Role	Notes
1983	Screwballs	Rick McKay	
1986	Check It Out!	Roger	Season 2, Episode 2: Edna's Phantom Romance
1986–1991	The Comedy Mill		
1989	In Opposition	Tom Sheridan	
1992	Davis Rules	Man #2	S2, E14: Ferry Tale
1992	Cheers	Kirby	2 episodes
1993–2001	The Red Green Show	Ranger Gord	Recurring; Nominated - Gemini Award for Best Performance in a Comedy Program or Series (2000) & (2001)
1993	Seinfeld	Lloyd Braun	"The Non-Fat Yogurt"
1994	Burke's Law	Bill Kingsley	"Who Killed the Anchorman?"
1994	Viper	Arnie Nevelson	
1995	Picture Perfect	Agent Sloan	
1996	Forever Knight	Gefford Weintroff	
1996	Goosebumps	Jeffery Burton	"Revenge of the Lawn Gnomes"
1996–2005	The Newsroom	Jim Walcott	Recurring; Won - Gemini Award for Best Performance in a Comedy Program or Series (1998)
1997–2000	Ned's Newt	Eric "Dad" Flemkin	Voice
1997–1999	The Mr. Men Show	Game Show Guy/Pal/Various	
1998–2004	Made in Canada	Alan Roy, CEO	Nominated - Gemini Award for Best Performance in a Comedy Program or Series (1999) & (2003); Won - Gemini Award for Best Ensemble Performance in a Comedy Program or Series (2001), (2002) & (2004); Nominated - Canadian Comedy Award for Best Performance by a Male - Television (2003)
1999	Genius	Dean Wallace	Television film
2000	The Misadventures of Tron Bonne	Digger	Videogame
2000	Ginger Snaps	Mr. Wayne	
2002	Royal Canadian Air Farce	Various	Episode 9.16; Nominated - Gemini Award for Best Individual Performance in a Comedy Program or Series (2002)
2003	Eloise at the Plaza	Mr. Nye	
2005	Cheaper by the Dozen 2	Mike Romanow	
2005	Slings & Arrows	Mr. Archer	5 episodes
2005	Niagara Motel	Henry	
2006–2008	Captain Flamingo	Announcer	Voice
2006–2008	Ruby Gloom	Scaredy Bat	Voice; Nominated - Gemini Award for Best Individual or Ensemble Performance in an Animated Program or Series (2008)
2006–2008	Billable Hours	Clark Claxton, Sr.	19 episodes Nominated - Gemini Award for Best Ensemble Performance in a Comedy Program or Series (2009)
2008–present	Murdoch Mysteries	Terrence Meyers	Recurring
2008	Coopers' Camera	Tim Cooper	
2008	Eating Buccaneers	Jerry	Nominated - Canadian Comedy Award for Best Performance by a Male - Film
2008–2009	Best Ed	Additional voices	26 episodes
2009	Willa's Wild Life	Darrel "Dad" Fisher	Voice
2009	Leslie, My Name Is Evil	Walter	
2009	Little Mosque on the Prairie	Mr. Bryson	Season 3, Episode 12: Double Troubles
2010	18 to Life	Ben Bellow	Main role (2010-2011); Nominated - Gemini Award for Best Ensemble Performance in a Comedy Program or Series (2010) & (2011); Won - Gemini Award for Best Performance by an Actor in a Continuing Leading Comedic Role (2011)
2010	GravyTrain	Houston GravyTrain, Sr.	
2012–2017	Saving Hope	Randall Crane	Recurring
2013	Sex After Kids	Sean	
2014	The Best Laid Plans	Eric Cameron	
2014	Big News from Grand Rock	Bill	
2015	Suits	Avery McKernon	
2016	Sadie's Last Days on Earth	Roger Mitchell	
2017–2023	Workin' Moms	Richard Greenwood	Recurring
2018	Into Invisible Light	Michael	
2019	Hudson & Rex	Sam Bronstein	Episode: "The Mourning Show"
2024	Sullivan's Crossing	Harvey	Episode: "Truth and Consequences"
2024	Seeds		
2025	Law & Order Toronto: Criminal Intent	Neil Kent	season 2 episode 7 "The Man in the Stadium"
2025	The Z-Suite	Oliver	
