= Bob Bainborough =

Canadian actor and comedian (born 1951)

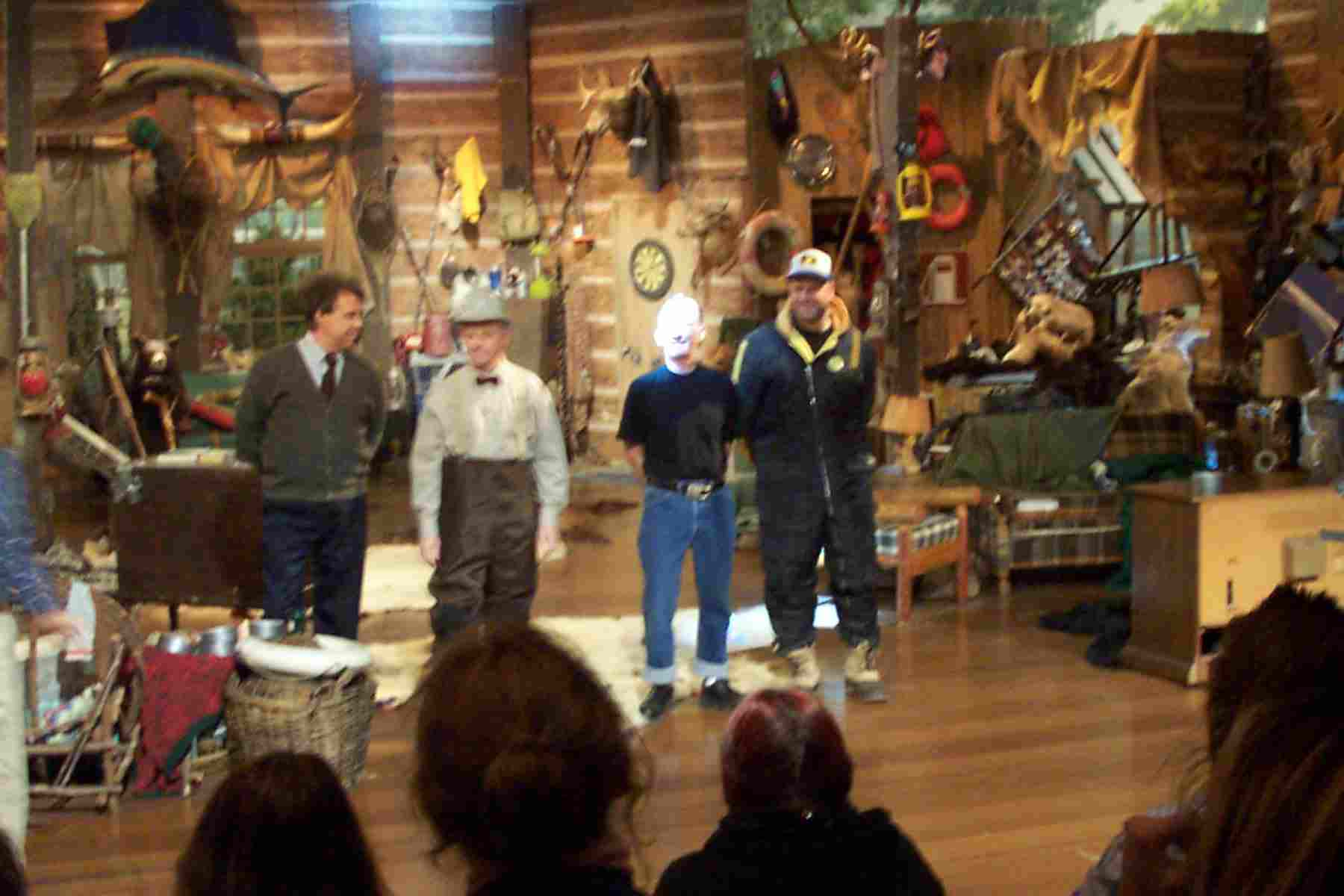
- Bob Bainborough (far left) on the set of the Red Green Show in 2004
- Born: 1951 (age 74–75); Lethbridge, Alberta, Canada
- Occupations: Actor, comedian
- Years active: 1984–present

Bob Bainborough (born 1951) is a Canadian actor and comedian. He is known for playing the role of Dalton Humphrey in the Canadian comedy series The Red Green Show, and appearances on History Bites. Bainborough was nominated for a Gemini Award in both series.

== Early life ==
Bainborough had originally registered to begin pre-med, but switched majors and earned a degree in the Fine Arts from the University of Alberta in Edmonton. He began working in regional theatre, until he co-wrote and performed in Paper Wheat with the 25th Street House Players in Saskatoon, Saskatchewan in 1973. Paper Wheat was a play about the effect of free trade on farmers. Shortly after Paper Wheat, Bainborough began working with The Second City in Edmonton, later moving to Toronto. He remained a member of the Second City Company from 1984 to 1990. In 1982, Bainborough played Jim in Roger Tilton's film Pilots North. In 1987, he won the Dora Mavor Moore Award for Outstanding New Revue or Musical, and in 1990, he directed for the Mainstage Wing of the Second City Company. After his run with Second City, Bainborough worked as a creative director, commercial voice over performer and writer for corporate communications. During this time he also worked on other projects, such as a weekly radio broadcast on the Canadian Broadcasting Corporation's Dayshift series called The Neighbours, the CBC pilot 110 Lombard St., and the radio show Bob Normal and the Forces of Chaos, which later aired on Toronto's The Fan 590, which he wrote, produced and performed.

== TV career ==
Bainborough joined The Red Green Show in 1994, with the debut appearance of his character Dalton Humphrey, and was also a writer for the show from 1995 until 2002. He was nominated for the Gemini Awards for this role. In 1999 he was nominated for the category "Best Writing: Comedy or Variety Program or Series", in 2000 for "Best Performance: Comedy Program or Series" and again in 2001 for "Best Writing: Comedy or Variety Program or Series" and "Ensemble Performance: Comedy Program or Series".

Bainborough joined the cast of History Bites during its first season in 1997. By 2000, he was nominated for a Gemini Award for "Best Performance or Host: Variety Program or Series".

In 2015, Bainborough appeared as shop owner Maynard Oltorf in two episodes of the FX (TV channel) series Fargo.

== Film career ==
In 2002, Bainborough appeared in Men with Brooms and Duct Tape Forever.

== Filmography ==
Bob Bainborough film and television acting credits
Year	Title	Role	Notes
1982	Pilots North	Jim	Docudrama film
1986	Really Weird Tales	Gary	Television film. Segment: "All's Well that Ends Strange"
1991	Counterstrike	Sergeant	Episode: "The Dilemma"
1994–2006	The Red Green Show	Dalton Humphrey	152 episodes
1998–2008	History Bites	(various)	29 episodes
2002	Men with Brooms	Greg Guinness	Theatrical film
2002	Duct Tape Forever	Dalton Humphrey	Theatrical film
2015	Fargo	Maynard Oltorf	2 episodes
2026	Murdoch Mysteries	Inspector Cleasby	Episode: "The Hunting Lodge"
