= Wayne Robson =

Canadian actor (1946–2011)

- Born: April 29, 1946; Vancouver, British Columbia, Canada
- Died: April 4, 2011 (aged 64); Toronto, Ontario, Canada
- Occupation: Actor
- Years active: 1971–2011
- Spouse: Lynn Woodman (m. 1985)
- Children: 2

Wayne Robson (April 29, 1946 – April 4, 2011) was a Canadian television, stage, voice, and film actor known for playing the part of Mike Hamar, an ex-convict and sometime thief, on the Canadian sitcom The Red Green Show from 1993 to 2006, as well as in the 2002 film Duct Tape Forever.

Robson was also known as the escape artist character Rennes, "the Wren", from the 1997 science fiction film Cube. He was in the episode "A Miracle of a Rare Device" on The Ray Bradbury Theater in 1989.

== Early life and career ==
Robson was born in Vancouver, British Columbia. He began his acting career on stage there but moved with his family to Toronto, Ontario, where he continued stage acting and appeared in Canadian television commercials in the 1970s. After receiving several small character roles in films such as McCabe & Mrs. Miller (1971) and Popeye (1980), Robson starred in the 1984 film The Grey Fox, for which he was nominated for a Genie Award for Best Supporting Actor.

Robson voiced Bloom in the cartoon Pippi Longstocking and Matthew Cuthbert in Anne of Green Gables: The Animated Series. He also voiced Professor Cuthbert Calculus in The Adventures of Tintin between 1991 and 1992 and Melvin Fish in the animated series Bob and Margaret. Robson played minor characters in such films as Finders Keepers (1984), One Magic Christmas (1985), Parents (1989), Frank on The Rescuers Down Under (1990), Double, Double, Toil and Trouble (1993), Dolores Claiborne (1995), Two If by Sea (1996), Cube (1997), Wrong Turn (2003), Welcome to Mooseport (2004), The Incredible Hulk (2008), and Survival of the Dead (2009).

He appeared as Christie in the TV movie The Diviners (1993), based on the Governor General's Award-winning novel by Margaret Laurence, and as Holly Hunter's ailing father, Tug Jones, in the TV movie Harlan County War (2000). Robson was nominated and won several Gemini Awards. He appeared in the TV series and miniseries The New Twilight Zone, The Good Germany, Puppets Who Kill, Relic Hunter, and Lexx.

== Death ==
Robson died while in rehearsals for The Grapes of Wrath at the Stratford Festival in Stratford, Ontario, Canada, on April 4, 2011, from a heart attack, at age 64.

== Selected filmography ==
- McCabe & Mrs. Miller (1971) – Bartender
- Russian Roulette (1975) – Mechanic (uncredited)
- Twice Upon a Time... (1979) - Desk clerk
- Popeye (1980) – Chizzelflint, the Pawnbroker
- Improper Channels (1981) – Prisoner
- The Grey Fox (1982) – Shorty
- Finders Keepers (1984) – Zev Tyndale
- Just the Way You Are (1984) – Theater Assistant Manager
- Mrs. Soffel (1984) – Halliday
- One Magic Christmas (1985) – Harry Dickens
- Bullies (1986) – Vern
- Dead of Winter (1987) – Officer Huntley
- Candy Mountain (1987) – Buddy Burke
- Housekeeping (1987) – Principal
- And Then You Die (1987) – Wally Degan
- Goofballs (1987) – Stick
- Something About Love (1988) – Myles
- Parents (1989) – Lab Attendant
- Buying Time (1989) – Rolley
- Bye Bye Blues (1989) – Pete
- Justice Denied (1989) – Roy Ebsary
- T. and T. (1989) – Wendell
- T. and T. (1990) – Junior G.
- Love & Murder (1990) – Jeff
- Dark Horse (1990) – Elliot
- The Rescuers Down Under (1990) – Frank the Lizard (voice)
- Bingo (1991) – Four Eyes
- The Adventures of Tintin (1991-1992, TV series) - Professor Cuthbert Calculus
- Double, Double, Toil and Trouble (1993, TV Movie) – Gravedigger
- Scales of Justice (1993) - Wilbert Coffin, episode "Regina v Coffin"
- April One (1994) – Wayne Brock
- RoboCop:The Series (1994) – Shorty
- Dolores Claiborne (1995) – Sammy Marchant
- Goosebumps (1995) - Jimmy O'James
- National Lampoon's Senior Trip (1995) – Frank Hardin
- When the Dark Man Calls (1995) – Billy Orr
- Two If by Sea (1996) – Beano Callahan
- Getting Away with Murder (1996) – Bartender
- Pippi Longstocking (1997) – Bloom (voice)
- Affliction (1997) – Nick Wickham
- Cube (1997) – Rennes
- Babar: King of the Elephants (1999) – Marabou / Sales Manager (voice)
- Redwall (1999) - Methuselah (voice)
- The Highwayman (2000) – Cruickshank
- Lexx (2000) - Gubby Mok
- Anne of Green Gables: The Animated Series (2001) – Matthew Cuthbert (voice)
- Duct Tape Forever (2002) – Mike Hamar
- Mark Twain's Roughing It (2002) – Mr. Ballau
- Interstate 60 (2002) – Tolbert (Deep Stomach)
- Wrong Turn (2003) – Maynard Odets
- Cold Creek Manor (2003) – Stan Holland
- Welcome to Mooseport (2004) – Morris Gutman
- Miss Spider's Sunny Patch Friends (2004–2006, TV Series) - Mr Mantis (voice)
- Stuck (2007) – Mr. Binckley
- Wrong Turn 2: Dead End (2007) – Maynard Odets
- In Between (2007) – Professor
- The Incredible Hulk (2008) – Boat Captain
- The Timekeeper (2009) – Lomacki
- Survival of the Dead (2009) – Tawdry
- Servitude (2011) – Donny (final film role)
