= Jerry Schaefer =

Canadian actor, comedian, writer

- Born: Toronto, Ontario, Canada
- Other name: Jerry Schaeffer
- Occupations: Actor, comedian, writer
- Years active: 1995–present

Jerry Schaefer is a Canadian actor who is best known for his role as Possum Lake animal control officer Ed Frid on The Red Green Show.

== Career ==
Jerry is a veteran of The Second City, where he worked as an instructor in the conservatory program. As a member of the comedy troupe The Chumps, he helped create and perform several long-running pop culture parodies and a series of improvised one-act plays. They also improvised a series for CBC Radio.

In film, Schaefer has worked with Carl Reiner and Bette Midler in That Old Feeling, with Bruce McCulloch and Natasha Henstridge in Dog Park, and with Angelina Jolie in Pushing Tin.

Schaefer's television credits include The Kids in the Hall, That’s So Weird, Comics!, Degrassi: The Next Generation, The Ron James Show, Dan for Mayor, SketchCom, Due South and Howie Do It with Howie Mandel. He was also a regular character on The Red Green Show, where he played Ed Frid, an animal control expert who was deathly afraid of all animals.

Schaefer was head writer for the CBC Radio comedy series The Muckraker. He also wrote and produced satirical, current event comedy for What a Week.

== Personal life ==
When he is not acting, Schaefer is teaching workshops on improv and sketch comedy writing. Most recently, Schaefer improvised a show with noted Beat poet Ken Nordine at the Chicago Improv Festival.

From time to time, Schaefer is paid to appear in commercials to please his parents.

== Filmography ==
- 11.22.63 (2016)
- Clarity (short) (2011)
- Clown Therapy (short) (2010)
- Survival of the Dead (2009)
- Cake (2005)
- Secondary High (2002)
- Duct Tape Forever (2002)
- Dick (1999)
- Dog Park (1998)
- That Old Feeling (1997)
- Tommy Boy (1995)
