= The Red Green Show =

Canadian comedy television series (1991–2006)

- Three of the characters from The Red Green Show. From left to right: Harold (Patrick McKenna), Red (Steve Smith), and Bill (Rick Green).
- Created by: Steve Smith; Rick Green
- Starring: Steve Smith; Patrick McKenna; Rick Green; Jeff Lumby; Wayne Robson; Bob Bainborough
- Country of origin: Canada
- No. of seasons: 15
- No. of episodes: 300 (list of episodes)

Production
- Executive producers: Ronald Lillie (1991–1996); William Johnston (1991–1996); David C. Smith (1996–2006)
- Camera setup: Multiple-camera and Single camera
- Running time: 21 minutes
- Production company: S&S Productions

Original release
- Network: CHCH-TV (1991–1993); CFPL-TV (1993–1994); YTV (1993–1994); Global (1994–1997); CBC Television (1997–2006)
- Release: 4 January 1991 – 7 April 2006

The Red Green Show is a Canadian television comedy series. It aired on various channels in Canada from April 4, 1991 until April 7, 2006. The show was created by Canadian comedians Steve Smith and Rick Green, both of whom also served on its writing staff throughout its run. Smith played the title role of Red Green, a middle-aged handyman who runs a men's club in the fictional Ontario town of Possum Lake. Most segments feature sketch comedy where Red and the other characters directly relate a story to a live studio audience, interspersed with segments featuring Red and a variety of secondary characters. Recurring themes of the comedy include Smith's love of vintage cars and handyman projects, most of which involve duct tape.

During the show's 15 seasons, it aired across six different networks but its longest run was with its final network, CBC Television. The show has also aired in the United States on PBS. The cast of the show also appeared in a feature-length film, Duct Tape Forever, released in 2003. Reruns air on CBC Television, CTV Comedy Channel, various Public Broadcasting Service stations, and on the Red Green Channel on Roku televisions. It was produced by S&S Productions. Following the show's finale in 2006, Smith has done stand-up comedy tours in character as Red Green.

== Premise ==
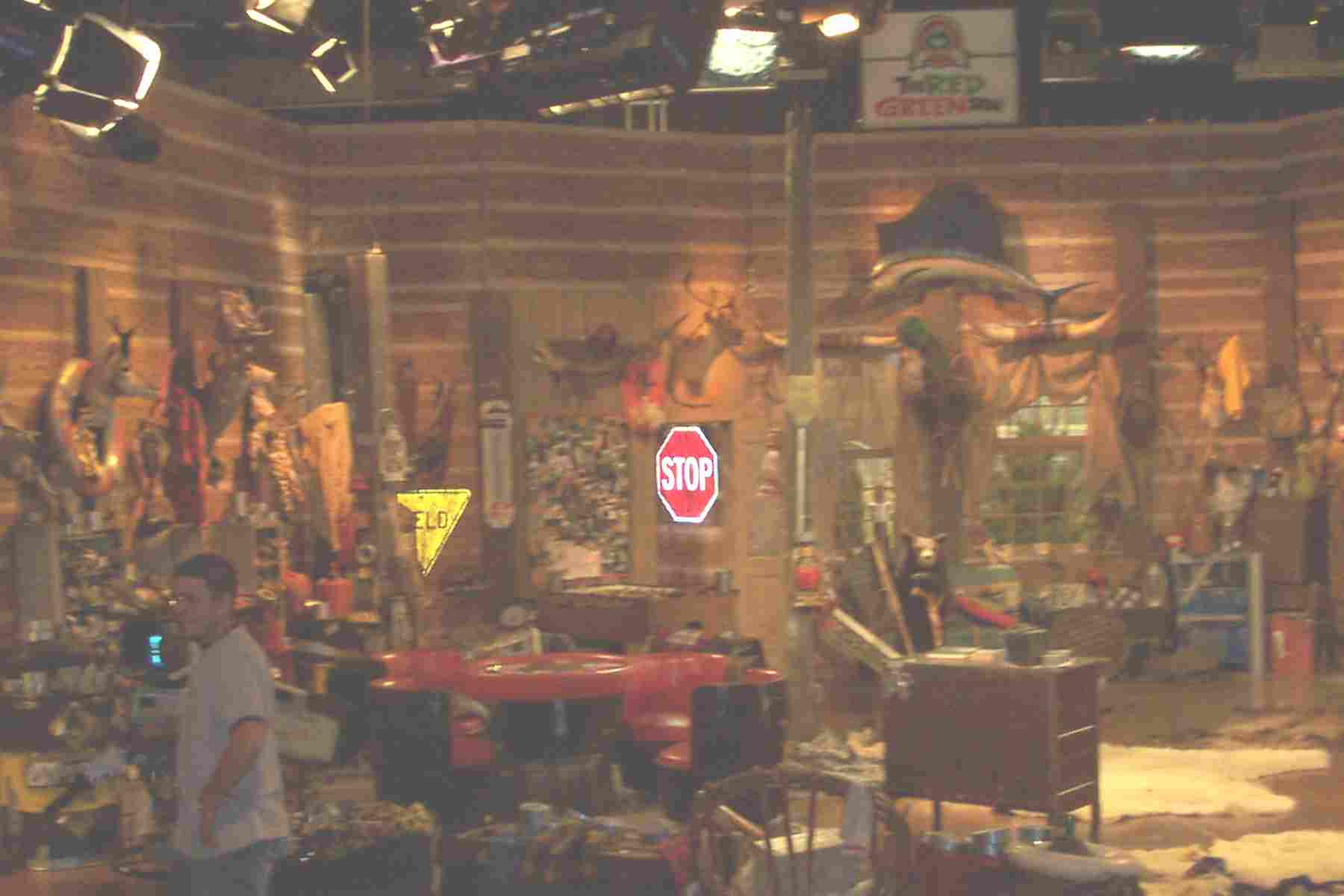
The Red Green set used for filming in 2004.

Red Green is a middle-aged, married handyman and president of the "Possum Lodge", a fictional men's club in the small northwestern Ontario town of Possum Lake. Much of the show centres around Red and the other characters attempting to fix various problems in the area or carry out projects, but their plans almost always lead to comically disastrous results thanks to Red's use of poorly thought-out shortcuts.

The show's basic concept is that of a cable television show taped in front of a live audience at Possum Lodge with multiple segments recorded at other locations. Main story points mostly occur in the lodge in front of the audience, with the primary characters relating most of the episode's events directly. Interstitial cut-scenes provide lessons and demonstrations in repair work, outdoor activities, and advice for men. Red and other characters often break the fourth wall. Some skits regularly interact with the audience, including expected verbal responses from the crowd.

== Characters ==
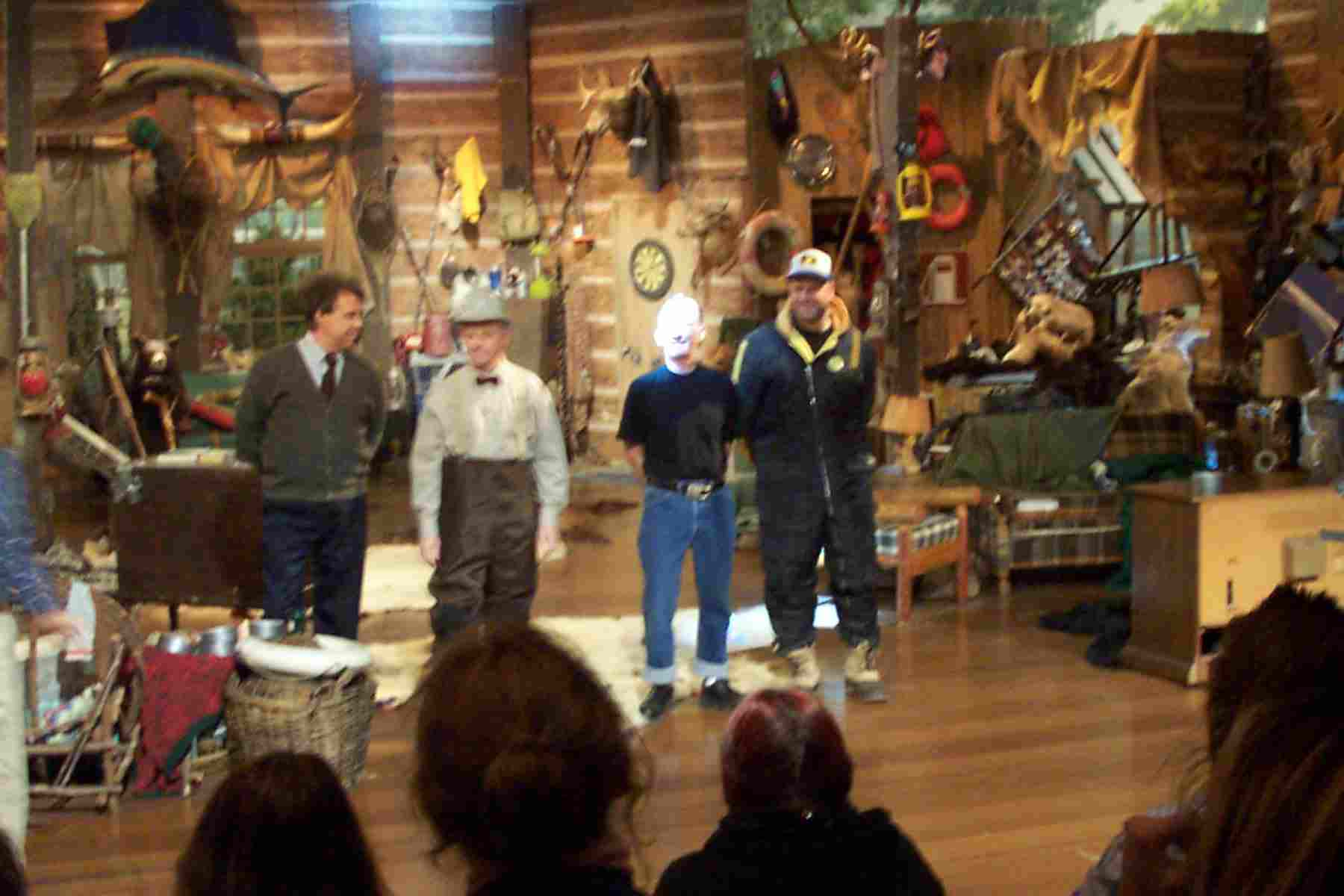
Some of the supporting characters that appeared during the 2004 season of the show. Left to right: Dalton Humphrey (Bob Bainborough), Winston Rothschild III (Jeff Lumby), Mike Hamar (Wayne Robson), Blair Cobden (Brad Cowan).

=== Red Green ===
The title character of The Red Green Show, Red Green (played by Steve Smith) is the leader of Possum Lodge and a self-proclaimed handyman who is constantly extolling the virtues of duct tape ("the handyman's secret weapon"). He and his wife Bernice have no children, and have been married for 25 years as of the series premiere. He is seldom seen wearing anything other than his distinctive outfit of a flannel shirt, khaki pants, suspenders (coloured red and green as of Season 3), and a Canadian military field manoeuvres cap.

According to his DVD biography, Red became the leader of Possum Lodge after gradually becoming more involved with it over time and becoming "the only guy nobody hated." At one point, he borrowed a large sum of money from his brother, who lost his job at a bank soon afterward. In repayment, Red employed his nephew Harold as the producer and director of The Red Green Show. In addition to being a handyman, Red also has several main philosophies in life, some of which are passed on to the lodge as a whole. Chief among them is the phrase "Quando Omni Flunkus Moritati" (pseudo-Latin for "When all else fails, play dead"). He also concludes each of his Handyman Corner segments with the phrase, "If the women don't find you handsome, they should at least find you handy." Red owns what is known as "the Possum Van", a 1979–1993 Dodge Ram cargo van, painted to resemble an opossum.

=== Harold Green ===
Harold (Patrick McKenna) is Red's nephew and the fictional producer and director of The Red Green Show. He is a nerd, having a significant overbite, thick glasses, and a number of verbal tics. Harold ostensibly controls the transitions between segments with a large homemade device. He is often appalled by Red and the other lodge members and he puts much effort into trying to change everyone's behaviour, usually with little or no success.

McKenna made only occasional appearances during the ninth season, and none at all during the tenth. The in-show explanation was that Harold had moved to the city to take an accounting job in a large company. When McKenna returned in the eleventh season, Harold quit that job and was hired by the town of Possum Lake to serve as its public relations specialist. At the end of the series, Harold dates and marries Bonnie (Laurie Elliott), a truck driver who shares many of his mannerisms.

=== Other characters ===
- Bill Smith (Rick Green) - Star of the "Adventures with Bill" segments; an enthusiastic but accident-prone dabbler in a wide range of sports and experiences
- Ranger Gord (Peter Keleghan) - A forest ranger who has lived in his watch tower for 18 years; known for being forgotten by the forest service, and his eccentric and emotional behaviour, resulting from his isolation
- Dalton Humphrey (Bob Bainborough) - An excessively frugal store owner who is also shown to be heavily controlled by his wife
- Mike Hamar (Wayne Robson) - A criminal who is on parole, and is known for his kleptomania
- Edgar K.B. Montrose (Graham Greene) - An explosives expert, often shown using dynamite in creative and dangerous fashions
- Winston Rothschild III (Jeff Lumby) - The owner of a sewage pumping business, who is very enthusiastic about his work
- Hap Shaughnessy (Gordon Pinsent) - A water taxi owner, known for telling exaggerated fabrications about his supposed involvement in various historical events
- Ed Frid (Jerry Schaefer) - An animal control officer who is afraid of most animals
- Bob Stuyvesant (Bruce Hunter) - A government employee who spends nearly all of his time playing golf
- Buzz Sherwood (Peter Wildman) - A reckless pilot whose seaplane is in a constant state of disrepair
- Dougie Franklin (Ian Thomas) - An American expatriate monster truck enthusiast with a terrible driving record
- Glen Brachston (Mark Wilson) and Dwight Cardiff (George Buza) - Two lazy marina owners, featured at different times on the show, who find ways to get Red to do all their work for them when he visits

== Segments ==
The show's structure evolved over time and included several regular segments that appeared in almost every episode, interspersed with the main plot.

=== Repair and Handyman segments ===
- Handyman Corner – Red demonstrates creative and often humorous ways to tackle relatively common tasks, or he builds things out of other everyday items such as turning a car into an exercise workout station. The segment always ends with the popular tagline, "If the women don't find you handsome, they should at least find you handy".
- If It Ain't Broke, You're Not Trying! – Members of Possum Lodge bring in broken items for Red to fix, telling bizarre stories of how they became damaged.

=== Adventures with Bill ===
A black-and-white segment in the form of a silent home movie, accompanied by Red's narration, background music, and sound effects. Bill Smith (Rick Green) attempts to accomplish a relatively straightforward task, try out a sport, or go on some adventure, frequently assisted by Red or Harold and using an assortment of impossibly large objects he pulls out of his overalls. However, the effort invariably degenerates into slapstick comedy as the characters fall victim to a series of outlandish mishaps. When Rick Green left the show from 1999 to 2003, other characters took Bill's place in these segments.

=== The Possum Lodge Word Game ===
A game which requires one contestant (usually Red) to get another one to say a certain word in 30 seconds by giving them various clues. However, the guesser consistently provides humorously mismatched answers based on their preoccupation with their own work or lifestyle. In nearly all games, the guesser eventually says the correct word by accident or a form of word play, typically winning a comedic prize described at the start of the segment.

=== North of Forty ===
Red gives out sage advice from behind his fly tying workbench, usually talking to older men about married life or coping with changing society. This segment always concludes with another famous Red Green phrase: "Remember, I'm pulling for you. We're all in this together."

=== Buddy System ===
Two characters (typically Red and one of his friends) give men advice on how to get out of trouble, usually with their wives.

=== Poetry, songs, biographies ===
During the first six seasons, Red often recited short bits of poetry in the woods. Some of these segments were named after a particular season and included Red's commentary on it, while others were presented as original poems and often included a humorous twist on a well-known saying. During the first eight seasons, Red and Harold would perform a humorous song while sitting by a campfire, with Red singing and playing guitar, and Harold accompanying him on spoons or other instruments and occasionally singing as well. In the ninth and tenth seasons, Red would present a brief biographical sketch of a "famous" Possum Lake resident, with additional comments by other characters.

=== Male Call and The Experts ===
"Male Call," featured in the first six seasons, involves Harold reading a letter supposedly sent by a viewer; Red provides an answer, frequently misinterpreting the viewer's question. "The Experts" had a similar format and debuted in the third season, running until the end of the series; here, Red and one or more of his friends gave ridiculous advice in response to alleged viewer letters. The host of "The Experts" (usually Harold) introduced the segment by referring to "those three little words men find so hard to say." The words in question were "I don't know," at first said by the host and later shouted by the studio audience.

=== Character-specific segments ===
- Teen Talk: Red or Mike gives advice to teenage viewers about growing up.
- Brief commercials for Winston Rothschild III's Sewage and Septic Sucking Services.
- Talking Animals: At Red's urging, Ed reluctantly talks about a small animal he has brought in, only for it to break loose and attack him.
- Ranger Gord's Educational Films: Animated segments, ostensibly created by Ranger Gord himself, offering advice on wilderness safety to anthropomorphic animal versions of Red and Harold. These segments were animated by Bryce Hallett of Frog Feet Productions, with Keleghan providing the voices of all characters.

=== Conclusion and credits ===
Episodes typically end with Red giving a message to his wife Bernice, usually a double entendre, followed by his signature piece of life advice in the form of a hockey metaphor: "Keep your stick on the ice." Beginning with the second season, the end of each episode also incorporates a meeting of the Possum Lodge members in the basement, opened by a sound effect of a squealing opossum and a recitation of the Lodge motto: "Quando omni flunkus moritati", mock Latin for "When all else fails, play dead". This is frequently followed by a reading of general announcements and/or a recitation of the Man's Prayer: "I'm a man, but I can change, if I have to, I guess." During the second season, the meeting begins before the closing credits and continues under them; in all subsequent seasons, the meeting only runs under the credits.

The final episode of the series features an altered version of the prayer: "I'm a man, but I changed, because I had to. Oh, well." Steve Smith later identified that this was a tribute to his wife Morag, who had simply commented "Oh, well" upon viewing the first episode in 1991. In one episode, women hold a retreat at Possum Lodge and sit in on the meeting, changing the prayer to "I am woman, hear me roar. I'm in charge. Get over it."

== History ==
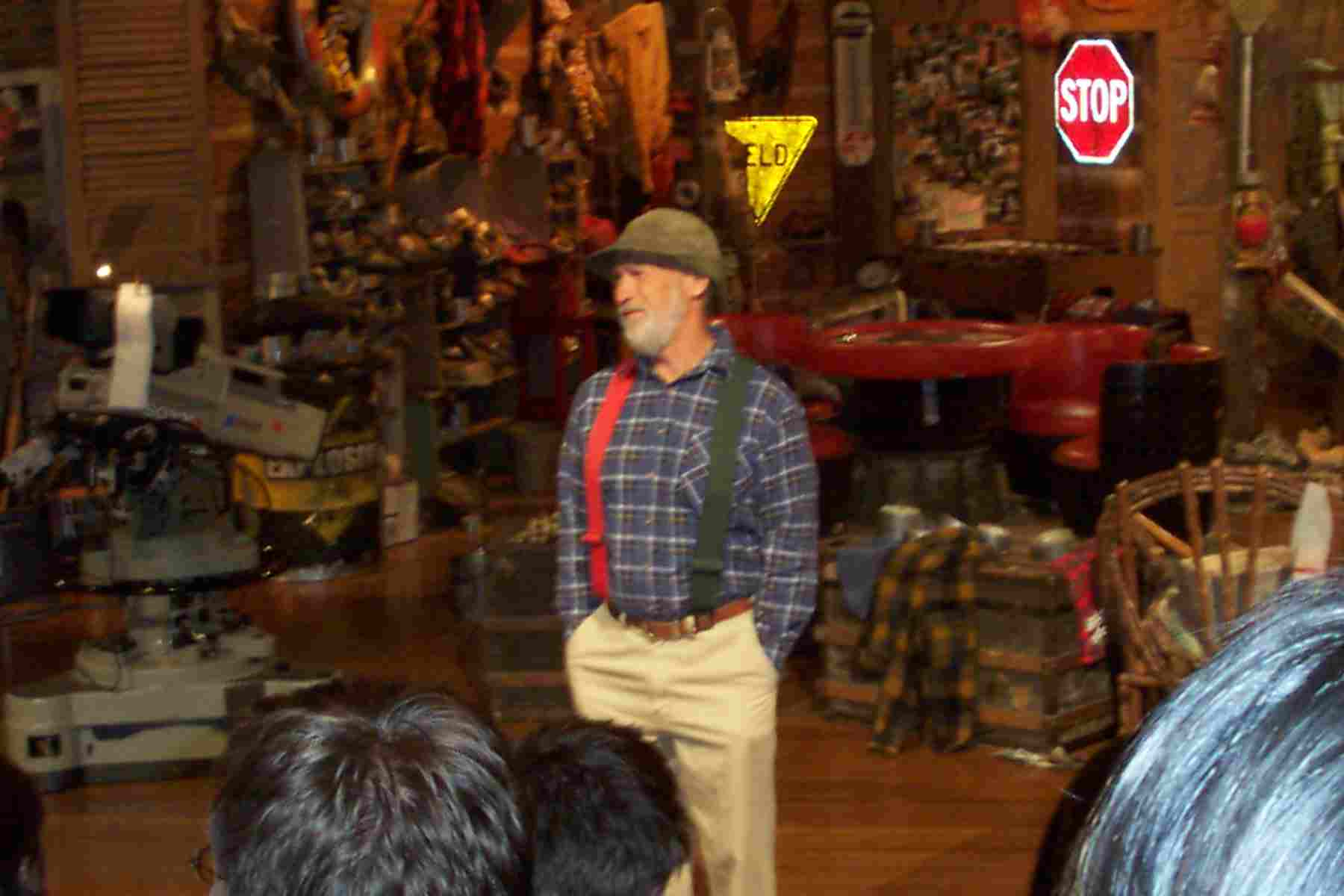
Steve Smith as Red Green

Smith originally created the character of Red Green for his 1979–1985 sketch comedy series Smith & Smith. The sketch was a parody of the long-running Canadian outdoors show The Red Fisher Show (1968–1989), starring B.H. "Red" Fisher, in which Red and his friends would show silent films of their fishing trips with commentary at "Scuttlebutt Lodge". The character also appeared in Me & Max and The Comedy Mill before becoming the focus of his own series.

When The Red Green Show premiered on January 4, 1991, it was filmed at the studios of CHCH-TV in Hamilton, Ontario for Seasons 1-2 (1991-1993), then on CFPL-TV in London for Season 3 (1993-1994), and then on the Global Television Network for Seasons 4-6 (1994-1997), and finally, on CBC Television for Seasons 7-15 (1997-2006). The show was renamed The New Red Green Show upon its move to Global, in order to distinguish it from reruns of earlier seasons, and reverted back to The Red Green Show starting in Season 8 (1998-1999).

The show ended on April 5, 2006, having aired 300 half-hour episodes over 15 seasons. Smith decided that the fifteenth season of the show would be the last. He told a reporter that when it came to his entertainment career "I kind of sense when things are coming to an end and I get ahead of it." He wanted to avoid going "one season too many" otherwise "It will at best be repetitive..."

The series finale was filmed on November 5, 2005, at the Showline Studios Harbourside location. At the time when the season began taping, the Canadian Broadcasting Corporation locked out staffers who were members of the Canadian Media Guild, rendering the show's regular studios at the Canadian Broadcasting Centre unavailable. The last episode concluded with the show breaking the fourth wall by thanking the audience and fans for their popularity. In addition, the Man's Prayer was revised to "I'm a man, but I changed, because I had to. Oh, well." Steve Smith later acknowledged that this was a tribute to his wife, who had simply responded with "Oh well" after watching the first episode air back in 1991.

The show staged several live mini-telethons (sometimes called "Red Green-a-thons") for public television stations in the United States. These usually coincided with national PBS fundraising drives, and featured contests between various PBS stations carrying the show. The goal was to encourage stations to add the show to their schedules, or to continue airing it if they were already doing so; during one event, Red playfully filled a wheelbarrow with stations that had chosen to drop it from their schedules.

On December 14, 2008, a retrospective special titled "The Red Green Story-We're All in This Together" aired on select PBS stations. The special was released on DVD along with a book. Also, despite stating after the show's final episode that he planned to permanently retire his character, in 2010, Smith embarked on the "Wit and Wisdom Comedy Tour", in which he gave live performances as Red Green in cities across the United States and Canada.

== Live tours and reruns ==
On November 29, 2012, Steve Smith announced a new "How to Do Everything" Tour, which began in Canada in late 2013 before going to the United States in spring 2014. The 2016 North American tour, "I'm Not Old, I'm Ripe", began in March and concluded in May, with stops in 25 U.S. cities. The 2019 North American tour, "This Could Be It", began in March 2019 and ran until the end of October, with shows in 34 U.S. cities and 29 Canadian cities. These tours feature Smith performing stand-up comedy in character as Red Green.

From September 1998 to August 7, 2017, The Red Green Show aired on The Comedy Network. From 2002 to 2005, reruns aired on CBC, Thursdays at 12:30pm and Saturdays at 6:30pm Eastern. In the United States, digital multicast network Heartland added reruns of the show to its schedule in September 2018. There is also currently a Red Green Channel on Roku televisions, and all 300 episodes, the Duct Tape Forever film, and one performance from the "This Could Be It" tour are available on YouTube.

== Episodes ==
The Red Green Show aired for 15 seasons, and a total of 300 episodes.

== DVD releases ==
Acorn Media has released portions of The Red Green Show on DVD in Region 1 in various incarnations.

In 2002–2003, they released six compilation DVDs labeled as "Stuffed and Mounted" volumes 1 through 6. Each DVD contains episodes from various seasons of the show up to season 10 (the most current season at the time these DVDs were released). However, there were no episodes from season two. These DVDs feature a spoken-word introduction by Steve Smith (out of character, as evidenced by his higher-pitched voice).

In 2006, Acorn began to release the series on DVD in complete season sets. Of note, the releases are identified by year, not season number; thus the 7th season is labeled as "1997 Season", the 8th season is "1998 Season", and so on. Seasons 7 through 11 were released in this format.

In 2010, Acorn changed formats again and began to release DVD sets that each contained three complete seasons. The first release, The Red Green Show: The Infantile Years, features all 72 episodes from the first three seasons in a nine-disc set. Extras include introductions by Steve Smith, and Red & Harold character biographies. Seasons 4 through 6 were released in The Red Green Show: The Toddlin' Years. Seasons 7 through 9 were released in The Red Green Show: The Delinquent Years. Seasons 10 through 12 were released in The Red Green Show: The Midlife Crisis Years. On 20 September 2011, Acorn released The Red Green Show: The Geezer Years, which contains episodes from the final three seasons (13–15).

=== Season sets ===
DVD name	Season	Ep #	Release date
The Red Green Show: 1997 Season	7	17	2 May 2006
The Red Green Show: 1998 Season	8	14	15 May 2007
The Red Green Show: 1999 Season	9	17	26 February 2008
The Red Green Show: 2000 Season	10	19	16 September 2008
The Red Green Show: 2001 Season	11	17	10 March 2009
The Red Green Show: The Infantile Years – Seasons 1991–1993	1–3	72	26 January 2010
The Red Green Show: The Toddlin' Years – Seasons 1994–1996	4–6	72	2 November 2010
The Red Green Show: The Delinquent Years – Seasons 1997–1999	7–9	47	15 March 2011
The Red Green Show: The Mid-Life Crisis Years – Seasons 2000–2002	10–12	54	31 May 2011
The Red Green Show: The Geezer Years – Seasons 2003–2005	13–15	55	20 September 2011
The Red Green Show: The Complete High Quantity Collection	All	300	16 October 2012

=== Special releases ===
DVD name	Description	Release date
Red Green, DVD (Duct-Tape Virtuoso Deluxe)	A collection of segments from various episodes centring around duct tape	8 May 2001
Duct Tape Forever	Full-length feature movie in which Red and Harold enter a duct-tape sculpture competition	29 April 2003
Red Green: Hindsight is 20/20	A retrospective on The Red Green show	11 May 2004
It's a Wonderful Red Green Christmas	A collection of Christmas episodes	19 October 2004
Red Green's We Can't Help It, We're Men	A collection of shorts and segments about men	10 May 2005
The Red Green Story: We're All in This Together	A retrospective on The Red Green Show, two years after the final season	2008 (PBS only)
Red Green is Special	Box set containing Hindsight is 20/20; Duct Tape Virtuoso Deluxe; We Can't Help It, We're Men; and The Red Green Story.	12 May 2009

== Reception and legacy ==
The Red Green Show was nominated for 23 Gemini Awards during its run. Its only win was in 1998, for Best Performance in a Comedy Program or Series, awarded jointly to Steve Smith and Patrick McKenna for the episode "The Movie." In 2023, Smith was inducted into the Canadian Comedy Hall of Fame in both the Creator and Performer categories.
