= Sons of Butcher =

Canadian animated television series

- Genre: Black comedy Satire; Rock music Adult animation
- Created by: Dave Dunham; Trevor Ziebarth; Jay Ziebarth
- Directed by: Karl DiPelino
- Starring: Dave Dunham; Trevor Ziebarth; Jay Ziebarth
- Country of origin: Canada
- No. of seasons: 2
- No. of episodes: 26

Production
- Running time: 23 minutes
- Production companies: S&S Productions; Smiley Guy Studios

Original release
- Network: The Detour on Teletoon
- Release: August 5, 2005 – January 12, 2007

Sons of Butcher
- Origin: Hamilton, Ontario, Canada
- Genres: Comedy rock; rock; hard rock; heavy metal
- Years active: 2004–present
- Label: Infamous Butcher Records
- Website: www.sonsofbutcher.com sonsofbutcher.bandcamp.com

Sons of Butcher is a Canadian adult animated comedy television series based on the rock band of the same name. It is animated using a variety of programs, put together using Adobe Flash. The band's music fuses vulgar absurdist comedy with rock music in a style that is described as "mock rock". Their band alter-egos are the focus of an animated television series developed by S&S Productions and aired on Canadian animation network Teletoon's programming-block network The Detour On Teletoon. Several of the band's songs were included in the soundtrack for the 2007 film Pigs, along with a cameo by Trevor Ziebarth, and his brother Jay Ziebarth.

== History ==
In 2004, Sons of Butcher began performing live in Hamilton, Ontario, for small but appreciative crowds. Their blend of comedy, rock and deli trays quickly became a local sensation.

After the completion of their second television season, the Sons of Butcher live act hit the road for a full 22 show East to West Canadian tour, reaching from Halifax, Nova Scotia, to Nanaimo, British Columbia. The tour culminated in a sold-out performance at the Mod Club in Toronto, Ontario - which was recorded for broadcast. The concert was released as a 90-minute live special called Sons of Butcher: Tourin' the Canada. It featured a mixture of live skits filmed across Canada and live performances from the Toronto show. The special aired May 18, 2007, on Teletoon in Canada. The entire, unedited performance was released digitally as a live album entitled Moppin' The Mod Club: Live In Toronto on February 14, 2019, through Infamous Butcher Records.

== Premise ==
The show follows the exploits of Sol Butcher, Ricky Butcher, and Doug Borski, who operate a successful butcher shop called "Sons of Butcher Quality Meats" in the slums of Steeltown, a city modelled after Hamilton, Ontario. When not tending to the shop, they play together at various venues in a Rock band, naturally called "Sons of Butcher".

It was announced on April 28, 2007, that Teletoon opted not to renew Sons of Butcher for a third season. On sonsofbutcher.com they declared that they'd be stopping entirely and their "guitars will be unplugged indefinitely".

A petition was started to renew the show for another season, taking donations from fans.

== Band members ==
=== Current ===
- DallWok (Matt Kates) – triangle (2007–present)
- Ricky Butcher (Trevor Ziebarth) – guitars, lead vocals
- Doug Borski (Jay Ziebarth) – bass, backing vocals
- Sausage Ralph (Daryl Ralph)– drums (2019–present)
- Christal Ballz (Chris Bell) – drums (2005–2007, 2021–present)
- Joey Salami (Rev. Dr. Joseph De Leo) – guitar (2025–present)

=== Former ===
- Sol Butcher (Dave Dunham) – guitars, lead vocals
- Pat Mugger (Tony Jacome) – drums (live) (2008–2021)

== Side projects ==
=== Moonlight Desires ===
Moonlight Desires is a Sons of Butcher side project named after the well-known Gowan song of the same name. Spinning off from Sons of Butcher's tendency to play 1980s covers in their live show which quickly became crowd favourites, Moonlight Desires was formed in late 2013 with the mandate of exclusively turning 1980s pop songs into heavy rock tunes. The first album Frankie Goes to Hamilton was released independently in the summer of 2014. The second album Just The Hits: 1981-1985 was released on September 21, 2017. It was named the #15 Best Canadian Metal Album of 2017 on Hellbound.ca, had many positive critical reviews, and was the first frontline release for Trevor Ziebarth's record label Infamous Butcher Records.

Band members - live

- Trevor Ziebarth - vocals, guitar
- Jay Ziebarth - bass guitar / vocals
- Chevvy Zappa - rhythm guitar
- Daryl Ralph - drums
- Marco Bressette - guitar
- Nicholas Daleo - guitar

Band members - recording

- Dave Dunham - drums
- Nicholas Daleo - bass guitar
- Marco Bressette - leads

== Main characters ==
=== Solsolido Ron "Sol" Butcher ===
Sol is the current owner of the butcher shop and the eldest and strongest of the three siblings. He inherited the shop from their father, Arpo Butcher, who died in an unfortunate accident involving a meat grinder. Sol is a recovering alcoholic, and is unable to drink even a small amount of non-alcoholic liquor without going on a massive drinking binge that causes him to grow a thick beard in an instant and run through the city streets wearing nothing but a green thong. Despite his gruff attitude, Sol is the friendliest of the trio, affectionately referring to anyone he likes as "buds"; he only seems to have a short temper around Ricky, who often shows a rebellious attitude towards his authority as an older sibling.

Sol writes songs for the band sometimes and has a habit of speaking in malapropisms. Sol's stupidity has had some consequences, as in one episode Sol (mistaking both the point and spelling of I.O.U.s). inadvertently becomes an infamous robber in Steeltown. Sol has had a few romantic interests in the series, including a woman named Sherry (whom he had literally dreamed about) and Jaco's daughter Suncheeps (whom he broke up with upon discovering she snored monstrously when she slept). He has gone to extreme lengths to earn their affections, including stealing massive amounts of coal in the hopes of making them into diamonds, and encasing himself in a feta cheese sculpture of Aphrodite to gain Jaco's respect. Despite owning the butcher shop, Sol has worked in a few other jobs over the series, such as a prison chef (while incarcerated), cruise ship worker, and small-time actor.

Sol apparently has a name for each of his nuts; one is named Terry and the other one Berry.

=== Rickence Raine Ronnie R. "Ricky" Butcher ===
Ricky is Sol's clinically obese younger brother. He seems to suffer from several eating disorders that raise his gluttony to the point that he will eat anything, despite the fact that this has made him suffer through multiple heart attacks and even a tapeworm (which he deliberately gave himself by eating many rotten fish in an attempt to lose weight quickly). While he often considers himself to be a ladies' man, he seems to have a thing for women who are either grossly overweight or considerably older than he is, sometimes to the point of being middle aged and having one or more children (which Ricky hates) and maybe even already having a husband. It was originally Ricky's idea to start the band, after finding his deceased father's old guitar in a box of his belongings. He is quite talented and creative with a guitar, often coming up with new songs and constantly trying to defend his self-proclaimed status of "rock god." He is usually the lead singer (Doug and Sol have been known to sing sometimes) and is constantly criticizing the other two for not being able to keep up with him; because of this, he seems to long for a solo deal when he finally gets signed onto a label, which he perpetually believes will happen very soon.

Although Ricky technically works at the butcher shop, he actually does very little work, and happily abandons his post there every time a better opportunity comes up. He has, in such cases found other work as a police officer/vigilante, steel worker, and a member of the frequently changing in tone band Feedbag. Ricky is violent and confrontational, but clearly makes a poor physical combatant, once receiving a bloody hole in his chest from Jaco, and being physically overpowered by three old women until thrashing blindly at them (all while wearing protective foam body armor).

Ricky dyes his hair later on in the series, explaining why his hair is a different color of that of his brother or father.

=== Dougland Peyronie "Doug" Borski ===
Doug is the 18-year-old janitor of the Sons of Butcher meat shop, hired by late proprietor Arpo Butcher. He was raised in Africa by a tribe of aborigines, and his adoptive parents were devoured by a 5-legged lion moments after revealing they weren't his real parents. After Doug failed his rite of manhood firewalk, the tribe banished him to Canada, where he found a job as a janitor. Doug has a vast collection of pornography and is obsessed with cleaning any and all filth.

Doug is often heard speaking in Ebonics because of his upbringing, sometimes to the point where he becomes difficult to understand. Doug has worked in several other jobs throughout the series, both alongside and in place of his janitorial duties. Among these professions have been Carnie, the janitor at a different carnival, cruise ship worker (along with Sol and Ricky), bodyguard, and impromptu butcher. A running gag in the first season involves Doug being hired for a new job in the middle of introducing himself, his new employer never caring to hear his name before giving him a job.

Doug is also addicted to pornography; he is seen many times playing with himself while watching this kind of magazines and not paying attention to anything else (even to the point when a girl hits on him and he's too absorbed in the magazines to notice). At some point, he tries to leave pornography behind and start to date real women, but he accidentally ends up working in adult cinema. It is revealed in the final episode of season 2 that Doug is color blind.

=== Arpo Butcher ===
Sol and Ricky's late father, was killed in a meat-grinding accident. Much like his eldest son, he was a heavy drinker as well, and frequently abused and insulted the boys when they were young (according to recurring flashbacks seen in the show), even developing the pet names "shithead" for Sol and "dorknuts" for Ricky. The current status and whereabouts of their mother are unknown.

Arpo's spirit briefly returns once to possess a haunted house that Sol created for Halloween, wherein he chastises Sol for not making it scary enough. He currently resides in hell, and his face is never shown (in its place is a Jack-o-lantern that moves its lips and eyes as if it were his actual face).

In one of Sol's flashbacks, it is shown that his dad used to towel whip him for not being able to pee in public, which in turn traumatized Sol up to his adult life making him "pee shy". Arpo's body is seen as being considerably overweight, and he has a long beard.

== Recurring characters ==
=== Jean-Guy ===
A muscle-bound French-Canadian man who occasionally appears as a friend to the Butchers. He first appears as a carnival ride operator, using marijuana smoke to enhance the experience. On one occasion, Jean-Guy gives Ricky steroids to improve his physical condition, but Ricky quickly abandons them when he discovers that they've massively shrunk his testicles. It was Jean-Guy who forced Sol to try to overcome his pee shyness by peeing in a public urinal at a rock concert.

=== Good Cop ===
A black person wearing a white shirt and grey slacks, always with the bad cop; his punch line is "What my partner is trying to say is..."

=== Bad Cop / Digs ===
A white, muscular man with long brown hair, always punching people, which then is followed by the Good Cop's punch line. He wears a red shirt. He is briefly referred to as "Digs."

== Guest stars ==
- Rudy Ray Moore (Dolemite) makes an appearance in Season 2 as Rudy the psychic janitor, and Joseph.
- Pat Mastroianni appears as Parsons, the womanizing metrosexual stud.
- Jeff Wincott appears as Ram Punchington, the martial arts action star, and a character that was based on Jeff Wincott himself.
- Karl DiPelino appears as Karl, the production assistant.

== Episodes ==
=== Series overview ===
Season	Episodes	Originally released	
Season	Episodes	First released	Last released
1	13	August 5, 2005	October 28, 2005
2	13	October 20, 2006	January 12, 2007

=== Season 1 (2005) ===
No. overall	No. in season	Title	Original release date
1	1	"Buryin' the Past"	August 5, 2005
2	2	"Huntin' the Legend"	August 12, 2005
3	3	"Livin' the Dream"	August 19, 2005
4	4	"Findin' the Nuts"	August 26, 2005
5	5	"Losin' the Love"	September 2, 2005
6	6	"Fishin' the Hole"	September 9, 2005
7	7	"Savin' the Shop"	September 16, 2005
8	8	"Doin' the Time"	September 23, 2005
9	9	"Suckin' the Soul"	September 30, 2005
10	10	"Payin' the Bills"	October 7, 2005
11	11	"Lovin' the Granny"	October 14, 2005
12	12	"Walkin' the Dog"	October 21, 2005
13	13	"Rockin' the Boat"	October 28, 2005

=== Season 2 (2006–07) ===
No. overall	No. in season	Title	Original release date
14	1	"Readin' the Bowl"	October 20, 2006
15	2	"Hittin' the Rez"	October 27, 2006
16	3	"Scalpin' the Ticket"	November 3, 2006
17	4	"Handlin' the Bike"	November 10, 2006
18	5	"Fightin' the Greek"	November 17, 2006
19	6	"Firin' the Band"	November 24, 2006
20	7	"Workin' the Steel"	December 1, 2006
21	8	"Ridin' the Rocket"	December 8, 2006
22	9	"Chasin' the Demon"	December 15, 2006
23	10	"Playin' the Part"	December 22, 2006
24	11	"Teachin' the Touches"	December 29, 2006
25	12	"Spinnin' the Yarn"	January 5, 2007
26	13	"Birthin' the Messiah"	January 12, 2007

== Discography ==
=== Studio albums ===
- Sons of Butcher (2005)
- Left Behind Volume One (2005)
- Meatlantis (2006)
- Left Behind Volume Two (2006)
- Rise of the Steaks (2010)
- Fall of the Steaks (2010)
- C Sections (2016)
- Lockdown In Steeltown (2020)

=== EPs ===
- Skids (2026)

=== Songs ===
Many of the songs from their first and second albums along with all the unreleased songs have been featured at some point in an episode of the Sons of Butcher animated series.

Sons Of Butcher:

1. "Decapitation"
2. "Love in the Raw"
3. "Cherry Thief"
4. "(Dream) Girl Dream (Lady)"
5. "Fuck the Shit"
6. "In Thru the Outhole"
7. "I Hate Girlfriends"
8. "Pump Me Up"
9. "Punch That Face"
10. "Rockload"
11. "We Fuckin' Rule"
12. "Prayers"

Left Behind Volume One:

1. "SOB Theme"
2. "SOB Story"
3. "The Gentle Art of Butchery 2"
4. "Tit Song"
5. "Cheeseburgs"
6. "Becomin' a Butcher"
7. "Helpin' the Community"
8. "Hate Triangle"
9. "Tapeworm"
10. "'Nsane Dream"
11. "Tenderize Me"
12. "Bacon Shakes"
13. "Epiphany in the Key of Bigfoot"
14. "The Gentle Art" (Original)
15. "Escape Ants"
16. "Lick Me Up"
17. "Low Carb Treat"
18. "Butcher of the Month"
19. "In the Cellar"
20. "Salon Tech"
21. "Rum Cruise"
22. "S'verybody Someone"
23. "Prayers for Fishies"
24. "Bigfoot Rap"
25. "Bacon Shakes (Reprise)"
26. "New Wave Them"

Meatlantis:

1. "Meatlantis"
2. "Action Reaction"
3. "Here to Rock"
4. "Party's On"
5. "Love Baster"
6. "Made Love By the River"
7. "I Need An Arm"
8. "Whip'em Out"
9. "F the World"
10. "Fuck Producers"
11. "Panty Dropper"
12. "Doug in Space"
13. "Suite: Bad Touch"
14. "Free Shit"
15. "Ultimate Drinking Song"
16. "Sneakin' in"
17. "Razors"
18. "Meatlantis Reprise"

Left Behind Volume Two:

1. "Arpo's House of Death"
2. "Chicken Fever"
3. "Come Fight Me"
4. "Crazy Toenails"
5. "Dear John"
6. "Dirtbike"
7. "Don't Egg Me"
8. "Feed the Snake"
9. "Fukt Country"
10. "Funky Drummer Carol"
11. "Go Vegan"
12. "Heavy Duty (Look At That)"
13. "How Will Doug Die?"
14. "I Kill Everything"
15. "Jaco: Portrait of a Kicked Ass"
16. "Why Must I Bleed"
17. "My Cow Son"
18. "Pineapple Breaks"
19. "Playin' High"
20. "Publicity Rocket 3.0"
21. "Publicity Rocket 4.0"
22. "Punch You With a Knife"
23. "Rashmen"
24. "Rock Rash"
25. "Scalpin' Interrogation"
26. "Scalpin'"
27. "Slaughterhouse Blues"
28. "The Lord VS Rock"
29. "The Message"
30. "The Plan"
31. "Trainin' Jerry"
32. "Trainin' the Robot"
33. "Until it Bleeds"
34. "Until it Rains"
35. "Warehouse Party"
36. "Wolfback Laceration"
37. "Workin' the Line"

Rise of the Steaks:

1. "Rise of the Steaks"
2. "The Cougar"
3. "U.S.F.A"
4. "Weed in that Brownie"
5. "Underage Party"
6. "Balls of Blue"
7. "How it's Long"
8. "Eat it Out"
9. "Burgers and Drinks"
10. "Puke all Night"
11. "Burnin' Skoolhaus"
12. "Fuck the Shit *Re-Mastered"

Fall of the Steaks:

1. "Fall of the Steaks"
2. "The Antimosher"
3. "Spring Break!"
4. "High Class Feel"
5. "Leather and Lace"
6. "Mr.Borski's Opus"
7. "Safe Sex Sucks"
8. "Call of the Bush Ape"
9. "Giant Tits"
10. "Four Cocks"
11. "The Steeltown Scene"
12. "Pembroke Skies"
13. "Eat it out (David's Wet Rub)"

C Sections:

1. "A Bigger Catapult"
2. "Beef & The Chicken"
3. "The Summer Of '16"
4. "The Deepest Crush"
5. "One Night In Bangkok"
6. "Rock God"
7. "Honkeytonk Daddy"
8. "Hand To Gland Combat"
9. "Palm Loin Armigiana"
10. "Lick Me Up"
11. "The Ending Story"

Skids:

1. "Denim Dreamin'"
2. "Makin' Bacon"
3. "Steeltown Handy"
4. "Peppercorn Steak"

Unreleased songs:

- "Gold"
- "Lion Tech"
- "Loverechaun"
- "Birthday Tree"
