= Golden Days Parade =

Coordinates: 64°50′48″N 147°44′30″W

The Golden Days Parade occurs in July in Fairbanks, Alaska every year as part of the Golden Days Festival, a multi-day festival that honors the city's past. The Golden Days Parade is one of the most popular festival events in Fairbanks. The overall themes for the parade and festival are "goldrush", "Alaskan pioneers", and "early Fairbanks history" (founded in 1901).

== About ==
Golden Days began as a way of collectively honoring Fairbanks’ past, but progressed to include the Fairbanks goldrush. Felix Pedro struck gold on July 22, 1902, in a creek 12 miles north of E. T. Barnette's Trading Post. The celebration of Golden Days is coordinated by the Fairbanks Chamber of Commerce and always takes place in the July week that is closest to July 22. The Chamber calls Golden Days "Fairbanks' most co-operatively produced summer event."

A rustic Alaskan vehicle rides in the Fairbanks Golden Days Parade, 1986

It is the largest summer event for tourists visiting Fairbanks and marks the height of the tourist season.

Can Can Girls participate in Golden Days Parade, Fairbanks, Alaska, 1986.

== Important dates ==
2001 was the centennial of the founding of Fairbanks. It marked the 100th anniversary of the landing of the paddleboat Lavelle Young on the banks of the Chena River, in the spot which came to be called Fairbanks. This year was also the 50th anniversary of Golden Days, which was started in 1951 by pioneer Kay Kennedy.

2002 was the centennial of the discovery of gold by Felix Pedro, so the theme was "Days of Gold, 100 Years Old". The year 2003 was the centennial of the incorporation of the city of Fairbanks.

2020 saw a "reverse" parade.

== Golden Days Festival ==
The Golden Days Festival lasts five days in Fairbanks, Alaska. It honors and celebrates Fairbanks' history and goldrush. During the festival the entire city is encouraged to wear "wild west" and Victorian style clothing to show their support for the festival. During the festival tourists and locals can attend a Can-Can show, the Golden Days Parade, Alaskan Pioneer luncheons, the Rubber Ducky Race, the 16.2 mile Golden Discovery Race, visit Pioneer Park (a.k.a. Alaska-Land to locals), participate in a variety of contests (such as the Hairy Man Contest), visit the downtown street fair, visit one of the old gold dredges, attend a stand-up comedy show, or whatever else happens to be going on. The events are listed for the festival at the Chamber of Commerce.
