= Steve Smith (comedian) =

Canadian actor, writer and comedian (born 1945)

Steve Smith CM
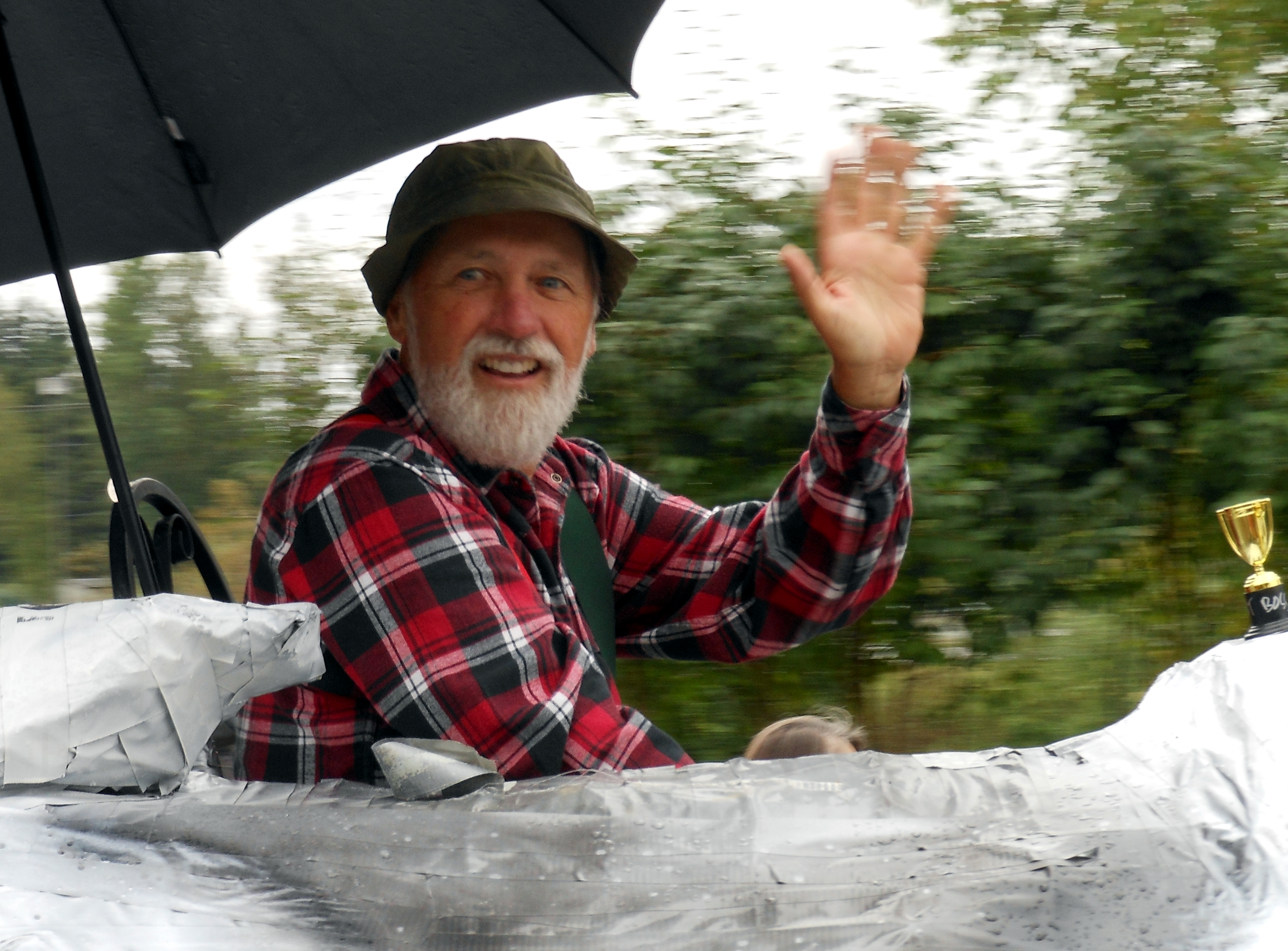
- Smith as Red Green, riding in the 2012 Golden Days Parade in Fairbanks, Alaska, representing Red Green local affiliate KUAC-TV
- Born: Steven Smith Jr. December 24, 1945 (age 80); Toronto, Ontario, Canada
- Education: University of Waterloo
- Occupations: Actor, writer, comedian
- Years active: 1979–present
- Spouse: Morag Smith (m. 1966)
- Children: 2
- Awards: Order of Canada

Steven Smith Jr. CM (born December 24, 1945) is a Canadian actor, writer, and comedian. He is best known as the co-creator and star of the sketch comedy show The Red Green Show (1991–2006), for which he portrayed the titular character.

== Early life ==
Smith was born in Toronto on Christmas Eve 1945. Before turning to comedy, he studied engineering at the University of Waterloo and then worked a variety of jobs. He was an elementary schoolteacher at Gladys Speers Public School in Oakville ON for at least two years, 1967-68. In late 1974 he and his wife Morag released a single titled "Let's Put The Fun Back In Rock And Roll" as "Jason" and it reached #80 on the Canadian charts in February 1975. In 1979, he began to produce, write, and star in Smith & Smith, a sketch comedy series with a cast consisting of Smith and Morag. The show was produced for Hamilton, Ontario's CHCH-TV and syndicated to other television stations in Canada, and featured the first appearances of the Red Green character.

== Career ==
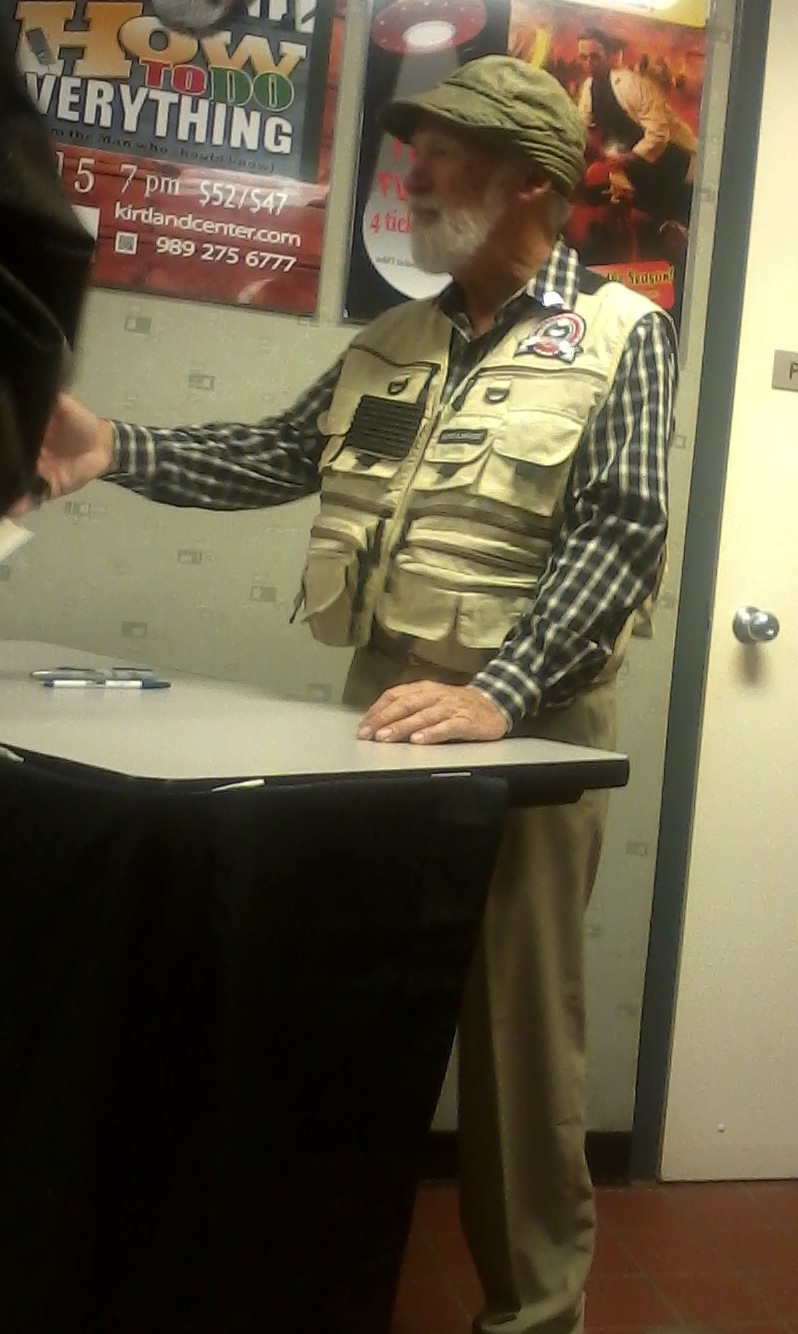
Smith as Red Green at Kirtland Community College, Roscommon, Michigan, April 5, 2014

In 1985, Smith created the family sitcom Me & Max. After the first season the Smiths went back to sketch comedy, creating the series The Comedy Mill, which ran for four years. Smith was a writer on Offside, a sports comedy series for CTV, head writer for Global's Laughing Matters, and the TV pilot of Out of Our Minds with David Steinberg. He wrote three episodes of CBS' Top Cops series.

In 1991, Smith co-created The Red Green Show and portrayed its titular character; the series ran for 15 seasons and 300 episodes until its end in 2006. In 1997, Smith was credited as his alter-ego, Red Green, in the "Pavement" episode of the Cartoon Network/Adult Swim show Space Ghost Coast to Coast. In 2002 the full-length movie Duct Tape Forever was produced. Smith writes a syndicated newspaper column as Red Green, distributed by Newspaper Enterprise Association. In 2009, as a public service announcement by the Ontario Provincial Police and the Ontario Power Generation, Smith supplied his voice to a talking fish, warning of the dangers of illegal fishing near government hydro dams. In 2004, Smith hosted a show on Space called Steve Smith Playhouse.

Smith has performed as Red Green on several tours, including the "Wit & Wisdom" Tour (2013), "How to Do Everything" Tour (2014), and the "I'm Not Old, I'm Ripe" North American Tour (2016). The 2019 North American tour, "This Could Be It", began in March 2019 and ran until the end of October, with shows in 34 U.S. cities and 29 Canadian cities.

== Personal life ==
Smith and his wife Morag have been married since 1966 and have two sons, Dave and Max. They also have six grandchildren.

On February 17, 2006, Smith was made a Member of the Order of Canada. On June 13, 2011, he received an honorary Doctor of Letters from McMaster University. On February 24, 2023, he was inducted into the Canadian Comedy Hall of Fame as a Creator and Performer, the first inductee in two categories.

== See also ==
- List of University of Waterloo people
