= Best Ed =

Canadian animated television series

- Genre: Comedy; Slapstick
- Created by: Rick Marshall
- Developed by: J.D. Smith
- Directed by: Rick Marshall
- Voices of: Seán Cullen; Patrick McKenna
- Opening theme: "One Best Buddy, One Best Ed"
- Ending theme: "One Best Buddy, One Best Ed" (instrumental)
- Composers: Steve D'Angelo; Doug Pennock; Terry Tompkins
- Country of origin: Canada
- Original language: English
- No. of episodes: 26 (52 segments)

Production
- Executive producers: Vince Commisso; Steve Jarosz; For Cartoon Network Europe: Richard Rowe and Cecilia Persson
- Producer: J.D. Smith (also creative producer)
- Running time: 22 minutes (11 minutes per segment)
- Production company: 9 Story Entertainment

Original release
- Network: Teletoon (Canada); Cartoon Network (Europe)
- Release: October 3, 2008 – October 22, 2009

Best Ed is a Canadian animated television series created by Rick Marshall and developed by J.D. Smith. The show chronicles the adventures of an excessively helpful and enthusiastic dog named Ed who everyone adores, and his best friend, Doug the squirrel, whom everyone calls "Buddy" but nobody likes. They live in their fictional hometown of Swellville. Best Ed was produced by 9 Story Entertainment and was animated in flash.

The fifth episode ("Nightmare on Sweet Street/Cat Fright!") premiered on October 3, 2008, on Teletoon as a sneak preview. Subsequent episodes were shown beginning October 5, 2009. The series ended on October 22, 2009. 26 episodes were produced.

== Plot ==
The show follows two anthropomorphic animals, Ed, a cheerful, extroverted and idealistic but none-too-bright yellow dog, and his polar opposite Buddy, a somewhat pessimistic but intelligent, introverted and realistic orange squirrel. Their adventures and sometimes misadventures usually cause them to interact with other characters. Whereas Ed is well-liked by all, and extremely lucky, Buddy is furiously despised, and extremely unfortunate, gratuitously so. Despite their differences in both personality and lot in life, Ed and Buddy consider themselves best friends and have many adventures, and misadventures, in their town of Swellville (a play on Snellville), Canada, frequently confined (but not exclusively) to their suburban 333 Sweet Street.

== Characters ==
=== Main ===
- Ed (voiced by Seán Cullen) is an eternally optimistic, overenthusiastic and hyperactive yellow dog who has a permanent zest for life, though is rather dimwitted. He is obsessed with helping others with whatever problems may plague them, but ends up being more of a burden than anything, often bringing total destruction or disaster to his environment in his misguided attempts to right what he sees as wrong or help others with their problems. He has many catchphrases, such as his trademark "Yee!" and "I'm here to help!", as well as "Sacagawea!", "Krakatoa!" and "Well isn't that curious?". He has a speech impediment (specifically a lisp) which makes him often say "sh" rather than "s". He is the proud owner of a pair of pink footwear he dubs "happy sandals", plus a collection of coveted plush toys (Teddy, Eddy, Marshmallow, Fluffyhead, Froffers, Quincy, Minnie, Winnie, Mellow, Mike, Butterbeak, Bubba, Curly, Shirley, Rear Admiral Horatio Hugginfellow, and Bub), and is a devoted fan of the TV show Mighty Measle Moles, a Star Trek parody, both of which Buddy hates. He is well-liked by everyone in the neighbourhood, although he considers Buddy his best friend. His eccentric behavior is typically accompanied by bagpipe music.
- Buddy/Doug (voiced by Patrick McKenna) is a neurotic orange squirrel who is more level-headed, intelligent, organized, and rational than Ed, but more unfortunate and emotionally unstable: he suffers incredibly from the antics of Ed, and everyone else, and few episodes end pleasantly for him. Almost everyone besides Ed vehemently dislikes him for unstated reasons (even though he never really says or does anything too unlikable, which he sometimes acknowledges), and he is often blamed for the shenanigans of his absent-minded friend. Due to this, he is prone to dramatic and emotional reactions whenever things go horribly wrong for him. While Buddy is often embarrassed, irritated, or grievously harmed by Ed's well-intentioned antics, he does his best to tolerate them lest he go mad (as exemplified in "Squirrel's Gone Wild"), and does cherish his friendship with him for the most part. He enjoys nuts (to the point of having a collection of them), and has a car with a giant acorn for a roof. He was part of a club devoted to the nerdy role playing game Battle Buddies a while ago, and still keeps in touch with the friends he made at that club (Whitey, Blacky and Red) in present day. He is very jealous of Mr. Thursty. His catchphrases are "Oh no, please no!", "It's Doug, actually", and "Okay? Okay...".

=== Recurring/Minor ===
- Mr. Thursty (voiced by Kedar Brown) is a large, brown dog of unspecified species. Thursty is inexplicably harsh and confrontational with most characters (particularly Buddy), possesses a short temperament, and is generally unpleasant. He also has a paranoid side to him, which lends hand-in-hand with his aggressiveness and arrogance. His real name is Thurston Plumtickler III (which implies there exists two previous Thurston Plumticklers that came before him), and his sidekick is Eugene. He speaks with a distinct African-American accent.
- Miss Fluffé (voiced by Carolyn Scott) is a large yellow hamster. She resembles a stereotypical fortune-teller, but this is not an often-employed trait. She has a one-sided crush on Ed that never goes beyond that due to Ed's utter obliviousness to her infatuations and only seeing her as a close friend.
- The Kitten Twins (Betsy voiced by Sarah Commisso and Buster voiced by Tessa Marshall) are a pair of young pink cats. Betsy and Buster appear cute and innocent, but are in reality the worst of the lot. They mainly show their true nature around Buddy, whom they greatly despise and enjoy tormenting in sociopathic and/or psychotic ways. They tend to speak in unison and giggle a lot. They are very wealthy, due to their high-paying jobs as top mitten testers. They also ride unicycles, as shown in the episode "Peddle Me Nuts".
- Dr. Quacken (voiced by Jamie Watson) is a tall, green duck who wears glasses and a white jacket, and Ed and Buddy's doctor. Whenever he gives Buddy the bill for his services, he uses "duck bill humor". He loves playing golf, yet humorously doesn't know what club to get on the ninth hole. He has the same voice (only a bit higher-pitched) and vocal tic (specifically, he quacks at the end of his sentences) as Quack from Peep and the Big Wide World, whom Watson also voiced.
- Eugene Tuttle (voiced by Paul O'Sullivan) is a short, green turtle who lives in a house shaped liked a shell, surrounded by a moat. He is the only reptile in the neighbourhood. Despite being present in the theme song, he appears infrequently compared to everybody else in the neighbourhood, and when he does, is generally depicted as shy and nervous. Mr. Thursty frequently picks on him and sometimes uses him as his lackey for his own self-serving schemes. Besides Ed, he is the only resident of 333 Sweet Street to not be intentionally mean to Buddy in any way.
- Heiny (voiced by Damon Papadopoulos) is a Scottish Terrier who wears a kilt, works as a crossing guard and has a Scottish accent. Heiny appears to have a temper and is easy to aggravate, often spotted yelling at others.
- Whitey, Blacky and Red are a trio of nerdy squirrel brothers who attended the same college as Buddy. The group hosts annual Battle Buddy Weekends with Buddy. They are loosely named after Wynken, Blynken, and Nod.
- Mad Dog Marshall is a short, psychotic, mentally-unstable dog with a pathologically intense hatred of squirrels and a tendency to go feral at even the slightest provocation. The Swellville police force considers him a dangerous criminal (either for his bigotry or other unspecified misdeeds); thus, whenever he appears, it's in a state of custody by the authorities. Ed and Buddy run afoul of him in "Driver's Ed" and "My Fair Laddies".
- The Royal Nut Club is a high-class committee headed by only the most important jet set members of Swellville society. Their most prominent member is Lady Beavertooth, who speaks with a posh, distinct British accent and adorns a fur collar that appears to still be alive. The club appears to be rather snobbish and condescending towards those they deem of lesser class than them, best showcased in their dismissal of Buddy once they arrive at his house in "Best Ediquette".
- Dr. Binky (voiced by Damon Papadopoulos) is a kooky pink monkey with a stereotypical German accent. Despite his zany disposition, he is a brilliantly skilled scientist with an extensive career in the field. He is visually based on Albert Einstein and appears in "Smarti Pants" and "Help Want-Ed".

== Episodes ==
Note: Every episode from "Rub My Ed for Luck" to "A Pox on Thee Now" was produced in 2008, yet aired in 2009 (with the exceptions of "Nightmare on Sweet Street" and "Cat Fright!").

In early 2005, development of Best Ed began. A pilot episode under the title "Fat Chance" began production in late 2006 and finished in early 2007, but was not released.

1. "Rub My Ed for Luck"/"Best Ediquette" (October 5, 2009): While doing some light yard work, Ed discovers a golden acorn, then leads Buddy, Thursty, Miss Fluffé, and the Kitten Twins on a search for the Lost Treasure of Swellville./After Ed volunteers Buddy to host a very important gathering of the Knights of the Royal Nut Club, he dedicates his best efforts to helping Buddy make a great impression and become a member of the club.
2. "Crossing Dogs"/"Squeals on the Bus" (October 5, 2009): After Ed volunteers to replace Heiny as the neighborhood crossing guard, he freezes under the pressure while guiding a group of 2nd-graders, endangering them./When Ed is temporarily blinded in a toast-related injury, Buddy has no choice but to include him in his plans to attend the annual nut convention, turning a simple bus trip into an unforgettable (and painful) ride.
3. "Smarti Pants"/"Sock It to Him" (October 6, 2009): After taking an IQ test and sneezing all the right answers, Ed is labeled a genius, then recruited by the Swellville military to save the world from an impending asteroid, using nothing but his knowledge of episode 37 of Mighty Measle Moles to guide him./When Buddy is too sick to prepare to host his Battle Buddy Weekend, Ed enlists the aide of a Buddy-shaped sock puppet to help him do things right, and, to Buddy's chagrin, "Sock Buddy" becomes the life of the party.
4. "Driver's Ed"/"Go Cart Go" (October 6, 2009): After discovering that his driver's license has expired, Buddy only has one day to study to take a driver's test, and has to rely on Ed's unique brand of driver's ed (and adrenaline from several close calls with a driver who's presumed to be the criminal Mad Dog) to help him pass./Buddy wants to win the Swellville Go-Cart Classic, but when Ed's help lowers Buddy's chances and improves Mr. Thursty's, a head-to-head showdown between Team Thursty, Team Buddy and Team Kitten ensues.
5. "Nightmare on Sweet Street"/"Cat Fright!" (October 3, 2008): In this Halloween episode, after Ed's spooky telling of the Legend of the Breadless Norseman puts a scare into his friends, he volunteers himself and Buddy to stand outside and guard their street, not knowing that the Breadless Norseman is about./On the eve of Ed and Buddy's birthday, a rash of burglaries in Swellville has Buddy suspecting the Kitten Twins of foul play, and though Ed believes that the Kittens are innocent, Buddy decides to investigate.
6. "Ed & Breakfast"/"Tooth or Consequences" (October 7, 2009): By placing a newspaper ad that promotes their house as a hotel, Ed & Buddy become hosts to two French-Canadian beavers. While Ed is happy to help plan meals, activities, and a tour of Swellville, Buddy can't wait to be rid of their guests./While showing off his nut-cracking abilities, Buddy cracks one of his teeth. At the dentist's office, Ed volunteers to help out as dental assistant, but when the dentist leaves, it's up to Ed to treat Buddy's bad tooth all by himself.
7. "Lost in Place"/"Scouts Dishonour" (October 8, 2009): In an effort to spend more time with Ed, Miss Fluffé joins him as his jogging partner. While running in the park, Ed & Fluffé get hopelessly lost inside a small clump of bushes, then wind up spending more time together than they bargained for. Meanwhile, Buddy rounds up a search team consisting of his neighbors to look for them./Joining Ed's local Pup Scout troop doesn't really appeal to Buddy. However, when he hears that achieving a merit badge also means a free trip to Nut National Park, he decides to join to earn the vacation.
8. "Chinese Please"/"The Unhappy Sandals" (October 8, 2009): Ed volunteers to help deliver food for a local Chinese restaurant and, due to a misunderstanding as to the destination of the food, Ed and Buddy embark on a journey around the world to complete their delivery duties./After Buddy takes Ed's "happy sandals" out for a walk, then loses them, Ed's "Edness" fades and he becomes intelligent and way too serious. With the police on the case and Buddy as their main suspect, he races to help turn Ed back into his old "helpful" self again.
9. "Perfect-O"/"Sleep Wrecker" (October 9, 2009): Knowing that Ed's helpfulness often causes more harm than help, Buddy buys a robot helper programmed to take over Ed's chores, but after suffering some accidental damage (because of the latter), the robot attempts to replace Ed altogether./Tomorrow is the biggest day of the nut-gathering year and, knowing that Buddy needs to get a good night's sleep, Ed does his best to help keep things extra quiet, only to wind up keeping Buddy awake all night long.
10. "The Night Before Hoppenscotch"/"Yeederhosers" (October 9, 2009): In this Christmas episode, it's Hoppenscotch Eve in Swellville, and in an effort to help Mr. Thursty enjoy the spirit of the season, Ed & Buddy brave the cold and his elaborate home-security measures in order to sneak a pair of shoes onto his doorstep so that they can be filled with presents./As a favour to the regular patrol dog, Ed & Buddy volunteer as mountain ski-patrollers in order to help protect the patrons of the Swellville slopes, then wind up causing an avalanche.
11. "My Fair Laddies"/"Confined to Ed" (October 13, 2009): After a run-in with Mad Dog, Ed & Buddy are enrolled in a witness protection program, where Heiny tries to school them in their new identities as fine young Scottish lassies./After Ed & Buddy catch the measles, they are ordered to stay in bed, and if being confined to Ed isn't bad enough, Buddy has to rely on Miss Fluffé (who's only focused on Ed) and the Kitten Twins to nurse them back to health.
12. "Local Zeroes"/"Outside Inmates" (October 13, 2009): After Mr. Thursty submits his security footage of Ed & Buddy's hilarious home accidents to Swellville's Harmfulest Home Videos (a parody of America's Funniest Home Videos), Ed & Buddy become local celebrities, then set out to give the public what they want by staging even sillier stunts for the cameras and their fans./When Ed & Buddy land in prison after being conned by a pair of convicts, Ed decides to devote his time to helping his fellow inmates enjoy their stay, while Buddy is forced into helping Killa the Gorilla escape.
13. "To Yee or Not to Yee"/"The Mighty Measle Role" (October 14, 2009): According to Dr. Quacken, the only cure to Buddy's sudden fur loss is to act more like Ed, leaving him with no choice but to change his stressful ways by taking life lessons from Ed./Ed wants nothing more than to win a walk-on role in Mighty Measle Moles, but when Buddy is chosen for the part, it falls to Ed to help prepare Buddy for the role of a lifetime.
14. "Follow the Yeeder"/"Come Fly with Yee" (October 14, 2009): After seeing Buddy's infomercial on TV, a leaderless group of lemmings appear at Ed & Buddy's front door. With Buddy showing no interest in being their leader, Ed steps in to help and does his very best to lead the leaderless group./Buddy is on his way to judge a nut convention, and Ed comes along for the flight. With no flight attendants on board, Ed takes over as head stewardess, and does his best (read: he ruins everything) to help the flight run smoothly.
15. "Paws for Alarm"/"Send in the Klownmans" (October 15, 2009): When playing make-believe in the backyard becomes too boring, the Kitten Twins decide to play "Evil Geniuses" with Secret Agent Ed. Buddy is recruited to join the game, and soon realizes that the Kitten Twins might be a whole lot more evil than he first though./A family of clowns moves in across the street, much to Ed's delight. Buddy is forced to confront his fear of clowns, and realizes that maybe they aren't so bad after all.
16. "Chamele-Ed"/"Camp Camaraderie" (October 15, 2009): When Ed buys a cloak that was once a prop on Mighty Measle Moles, he falsely believes that it gives him invisibility. With his newfound powers, Ed decides to help those in need, driving Buddy crazy in the process./Ed brings Buddy along to a team-building workshop being held at an outdoor recreation centre, and the two work on their friendship by participating in a crazy obstacle course.
17. "Squirrel's Gone Wild"/"Ed Waiter" (October 16, 2009): When Ed gives Buddy's prized nut collection a few coats of paint (then sprays them and him with a hose), Buddy goes completely nutty. Ed decides it might be best to leave Buddy alone and live in a box, but the latter soon grows to miss being around him./Ed's attempt to prepare dinner for Buddy fails, and the two decide to go out to eat. When all the waiters at the fancy restaurant they are dining at get fired by the mentally-unstable waiter, Ed decides to step in by becoming the new head waiter.
18. "Missing Mittens Mission"/"Talking Ed" (October 16, 2009): On the first day of summer vacation, Ed volunteers to take over for the Kitten Twins at the mitten factory. Buddy comes along, and a restful day at Nut National Park turns into a hard day’s work of counting mittens, and a super-secret mitten-related mission./Buddy's lifelong dream of participating in a variety telethon is hindered by his lack of talent. Ed decides to help out by teaching Buddy to be a ventriloquist, but his teaching skills leave a lot to be desired.
19. "Lost Ed Found"/"Peddle Me Nuts" (October 19, 2009): Ed buys Buddy a gift, but manages to lose it before he can bestow it on his best friend. Buddy helps Ed by retracing his steps... backwards./In an attempt to raise money for a children's charity, Buddy must learn to ride a unicycle. When his early attempts prove unsuccessful, Ed offers to coach him using his "superior" unicycling skills.
20. "Aye Robots"/"Where No Buddy Has Gone Before" (October 19, 2009): Ed discovers a rare flower blossoming out of the pavement on Sweet Street, and everybody wants to have it for their own. They decide to settle the dispute by holding a robot battle, with each resident of Sweet Street building their own mechanical fighter./When a Mighty Measle Mole convention comes to town, Ed drags Buddy along with him. Buddy is then introduced to the beautiful Bonnie, and does everything in his power to impress the gorgeous squirrel.
21. "Uncommon Scents"/"A Pox on Thee Now" (October 20, 2009): Buddy discovers that Ed hasn't taken a bath in three years, and has been using a clear lacquer to mask his smell. When the clear coat is removed, the smell is unbearable - so Buddy forces Ed to bathe, only to realize that the lacquer was the source of Ed's mojo. In order to restore Ed's mojo, Buddy must locate more of the rare lacquer./When Miss Fluffé decides that Buddy is too much of a fuddy-duddy, she places a curse on him. While Buddy couldn't care less, Ed decides he must do everything in his power to help get it removed.
22. "No Buddy's Hero"/"An Arm-Yee of One" (October 20, 2009): Ed rescues a group of school children whose bus has plunged over a guardrail. Buddy is initially given credit for the daring rescue, but the guilt of stealing the spotlight does him in./After repeatedly pressing the call button on Buddy's intercom, Ed winds up with both arms in a cast. Buddy is forced to wait on him hand-and-foot, all the while trying to peacefully sort nuts in his vault.
23. "Memor-Yee Loss"/"Long Bark of the Law" (October 21, 2009): When Ed over-inflates a gigantic balloon, the resulting explosion causes him to lose his memory. Buddy does his best to help, which only results in Ed thinking he is everybody but himself./After Ed accidentally removes an important piece of furniture from a local business, Sergeant Jo Jo shows up at his door. Buddy is convinced that Ed is under arrest, and convinces him to run away from Jo Jo as fast as he can.
24. "King Mr. Tut's Nut"/"Gym Dandy!" (October 21, 2009): When Lord Carnivore has Buddy take care of a very valuable, very ancient nut, Ed insists on helping. Ed's help isn't appreciated by Buddy, and it causes the two to end up locked in a vault together./Buddy receives a notice in the mail that he is eligible to join the prestigious Royal Nut Club, on the condition that he pass a physical test. Ed decides that he will do his very best to help Buddy prepare for the test; however Ed goes a bit too far.
25. "Ed for Sale"/"Rope-a-Dopes" (October 22, 2009): During Buddy's yard sale, a mishap with a pricing gun leads to Ed being sold to Miss Fluffé at a bargain price. Miss Fluffé wants to wait on Ed hand-and-foot, though this does not agree with Ed's natural inclination to help. All the while, Buddy, missing Ed, does everything he can to get his best friend back./To prove to Mr. Thursty that he is tough enough, Buddy joins Ed in the Swellville Tag Team Wrestle-Off. When Ed & Buddy unexpectedly make it all the way to the final match, they must face the toughest team of all - the Raging Bulls!
26. "Help Want-Ed"/"Screaming Yee-Bees" (October 22, 2009): After finishing with the Sunday funny pages, Ed stumbles upon the "help wanted" section of the newspaper. Believing that he has found his life calling, Ed decides to personally respond to each and every advertisement himself. Swellville then gets a super-sized dose of Ed's helping as he helps out any citizen in need, whether they need him or not!/In the last episode, on the orders of Dr. Quacken, Buddy must keep Ed awake for 24 hours to prevent the return of a horrible sleeping sickness - but Buddy cannot tell Ed why they must stay awake. Buddy tells Ed that they are trying to break the "Stay Awake Record", and then proceeds to take him on an all-night, cross-town adventure.

== Broadcast and home media ==
In Canada, the show first aired on Teletoon, with the final episode airing on October 22, 2009. It formerly aired reruns on the Canadian version of Cartoon Network and Toon-A-Vision.

In foreign countries, the show was also aired on Cartoon Network in the United Kingdom and other European countries, ABC Me in Australia, and RTÉ2 in Ireland.

As of November 2017, the show is currently streaming on Tubi throughout North America (US and Canada). It's also available on The Roku Channel in the United States, despite only having twenty-seven 11-minute segments.

On August 18, 2012, Madman Entertainment released Best Ed: Crossing Dogs on DVD in Australia. The DVD contains four episodes (eight segments) from the series.
