= Me & Max =

1985 Canadian sitcom

- Starring: Steve Smith; Morag Smith
- Country of origin: Canada
- No. of episodes: 26

Production
- Running time: 30 minutes

Original release
- Network: CHCH-TV
- Release: 1985 – 1986

Me & Max is a situation comedy produced for Canadian television station CHCH-TV in 1985.

Evolving out of the sketch comedy series Smith & Smith, Me & Max starred husband-and-wife comedy team Steve Smith and Morag Smith, and their kids Max and David. All four members of the Smith family played fictionalized versions of themselves, and Steve and Morag also played other characters, such as the neighbours and the boys' uncle Red Green, through split-screen photography.

The series lasted for 26 episodes, at which time Steve and Morag Smith went on to produce another sketch comedy series, The Comedy Mill. Following the end of that show's run, Steve Smith developed another series, The Red Green Show. The character of Red Green had appeared in all of the Smiths' previous shows, including Me & Max.
