= The Comedy Mill =

Canadian sketch comedy television series

- Starring: Steve Smith; Morag Smith; Mag Ruffman; Linda Kash; Peter Keleghan
- Country of origin: Canada
- No. of seasons: 4

Production
- Running time: 26 minutes

Original release
- Network: CHCH-TV
- Release: 1987 – 1991

The Comedy Mill is a Canadian sketch comedy television series, which aired from 1987 to 1991 on Hamilton, Ontario's CHCH-TV, and through syndication on other Canadian television stations. The show starred the husband and wife comedy duo of Steve Smith and Morag Smith, with a supporting cast that included Peter Keleghan, Linda Kash and Mag Ruffman.

The show was a revival of their earlier Smith & Smith series, which ended in 1985. For the 85-86 television season, the Smiths and their children Max and David starred in the family sitcom Me & Max.

One of the show's regular features involved parody music videos, presented by Kash as a caricature of a television VJ. Some of the parody videos even made it into rotation on MuchMusic and The Nashville Network.

After The Comedy Mill ended its run, Morag retired from performing and Steve launched his most famous series, The Red Green Show. Red Green had appeared as a recurring character on all of the duo's earlier shows, including The Comedy Mill.
