= Smith & Smith =

Canadian sketch comedy series

- Starring: Steve Smith; Morag Smith
- Country of origin: Canada
- No. of seasons: 6

Production
- Running time: 30 minutes

Original release
- Network: CHCH-TV
- Release: 1979 – 1985

Smith & Smith is a Canadian sketch comedy series, which aired from 1979 to 1986 on Hamilton, Ontario's CHCH-TV, and through syndication on other Canadian television stations. The show starred the husband and wife comedy duo of Steve Smith and Morag Smith.

Recurring sketches included a judge, played by Morag, while Steve's characters included William Shakespeare and a preacher. Sketches also included "The Kids' Show", a Polka Dot Door parody in which the hosts constantly bickered and insulted each other, and a sketch set in a bakery, in which Morag played the male front counter attendant and Steve played the female baker. Each show also included a humorous musical number, performed in costume, focusing on a famous couple in history, as well as a mailbag segment.

The show took a one-year hiatus in 1985, during which the Smiths and their children Max and David starred in the family sitcom Me & Max. After that show ended its run, Steve and Morag revived Smith & Smith under the new title The Comedy Mill, adding several supporting cast members to the new show. In 1991, Morag retired from performing and Steve launched his most famous series, The Red Green Show. Red Green was originally created as a recurring character on Smith & Smith.

Smith & Smith has aired in reruns on TV Land Canada.

Band members during the Smith & Smith series included Paul Benton (piano), Bob Doidge (bass), Bob McLaren (drums), Bernie LaBarge (guitar), Leo Sullivan (sax), and Steve McDade (trumpet). The music tracks were recorded at Grant Ave. Studio in Hamilton, Ontario.
