= 17th Gemini Awards =

2002 awards for Canadian television

- Date: November 4, 2002
- Venue: Metro Toronto Convention Centre
- Hosted by: Seán Cullen

Television/radio coverage
- Network: CBC Television

The Academy of Canadian Cinema & Television's 17th Gemini Awards were held on November 4, 2002, to honour achievements in Canadian television. The awards show, which was hosted by Seán Cullen, took place at the Metro Toronto Convention Centre and was broadcast on CBC Television.

== Program awards ==
=== Best Dramatic Series ===
- Da Vinci’s Inquest – Haddock Entertainment, Barna-Alper Productions, Alliance Atlantis Productions, Canadian Broadcasting Corporation. Producers: Chris Haddock, Laszlo Barna, Lynn Barr, Arvi Liimatainen
- Bliss – Galafilm, Back Alley Film Productions. Producers: Arnie Gelbart, Janis Lundman, Adrienne Mitchell, Ian Whitehead
- Cold Squad – Keatley MacLeod Productions, Atlantis Films. Producers: Peter Mitchell, Suzanne Chapman, Gigi Boyd, Steve Ord, Matt MacLeod, Julia Keatley, Gary Harvey
- Dice – Cité-Amérique, Showcase. Producers: Lorraine Richard, Greg Dummett, Gub Neal
- Foreign Objects – Rhombus Media. Producers: Ken Finkleman, Niv Fichman

=== Best Dramatic Mini-series or TV Movie ===
- Torso: The Evelyn Dick Story – Shaftesbury Films. Producers: Christina Jennings, Stephen Alix, Scott Garvie, Paul Stephens
- Further Tales of the City – Productions Bleu Blanc Rouge. Producers: Suzanne Girard, Luc Châtelain, Alan Poul, Tim Bevan
- Jinnah – On Crime: Pizza 911 – Force Four Entertainment. Producers: Hugh Beard, Debra Beard
- Society’s Child – Sienna Films, Buffalo Gal Pictures. Producers: Julia Sereny, Phyllis Laing, Jennifer Kawaja, Sharon McGowan
- Stolen Miracle – Portfolio Entertainment, CTV Television Network. Producers: Joy Rosen, Lisa Olfman

=== Best Comedy Program or Series ===
- An American in Canada – S&S Productions, Canadian Broadcasting Corporation. Producers: Howard Busgang, Sari Friedland
- Buzz – MTR Entertainment. Producers: Daryn Jones, Michael MacKinnon, Morgan Smith, Merilyn Read
- Made in Canada – Salter Street Films, Island Edge. Producers: Michael Donovan, Gerald Lunz
- This Hour Has 22 Minutes – Salter Street Films, Canadian Broadcasting Corporation. Producers: Jenipher Ritchie, Mark Farrell, Susan MacDonald, Jack Kellum
- Comedy Now! – Women of the Night – CTV, Hi Guys Ten Productions. Producers: Milan Curry-Sharples, Sandra Faire, Bronwyn Warren, Trisa Dayot

=== Best Music, Variety Program or Series ===
- Live at the Rehearsal Hall – Bravo!. Producers: John Gunn, Robert Benson
- The Thrill on the Hill: Canada Day 2001 – Producers: Matt Zimbel, Peter Hayman
- History Bites – The History Channel. Producer: Rick Green
- Juno Awards of 2002 – Canadian Academy of Recording Arts and Sciences, CTV Television Network. Producers: Stephen Stohn, Louise Wood, John Brunton, Barbara Bowlby
- The Guess Who: The Concert – Canadian Broadcasting Corporation, Midcan Production Services, Saifer Entertainment, ViK. Recordings, YaYo Productions. Producers: Norm Lussier, Lorne Saifer, Linda Nelson

=== Best Performing Arts Program or Series, or Arts Documentary Program or Series ===
- Dracula: Pages from a Virgin's Diary – Vonnie Von Helmut Film, Canadian Broadcasting Corporation, Royal Winnipeg Ballet. Producers: Vonnie Von Helmut, Robert Sherrin
- Nuliajuk: Mother of the Sea Beasts – Triad Film Productions. Producer: Peter d'Entremont
- Penn & Teller's Magic and Mystery Tour – Canadian Broadcasting Corporation, Channel 4 Film. Producers: Pauline Duffy, Elliott Halpern, Ric Esther Bienstock, Simcha Jacobovici, Jack Rabinovitch
- Heroines – Peace Arch Entertainment. Producer: Stan Feingold
- Ravel’s Brain – Rhombus Media, Idéale Audience, Yle TV1. Producers: Pierre Olivier Bardet, Larry Weinstein, Niv Fichman

=== Best Talk Series ===
- Health on the Line – HOTL Productions. Producers: Jennifer Fraser, Janice Felsky, Indra Seja, Susan Sutherland, Wendy Bryan
- Hot Type – CBC Newsworld. Producers: Alice Hopton, Andrew Johnston
- Mansbridge One on One – Canadian Broadcasting Corporation. Producers: Harry Schachter, Graeme McCreesh, Cynthia Kinch
- So Gay TV – Producers: Fiorella Grossi, Lili Shalev, Zev Shalev, Jason Ford
- Vicki Gabereau – Canadian Broadcasting Corporation. Producers: Karen Rapp, Cynthia Ott, Jordan Schwartz

=== Donald Brittain Award for Best Social/Political Documentary Program ===
- Offspring – Barna-Alper Productions. Producers: Laszlo Barna, Barry Stevens
- Aftermath: The Remnants of War – National Film Board of Canada. Producers: Michael Kot, Ed Barreveld, Peter Starr
- Culture Jam: Hijacking Commercial Culture – Reel Myth Productions. Producers: Lynn Booth, Jill Sharpe
- In the Line of Fire – Canadian Broadcasting Corporation. Producer: Patricia Naylor
- Waging Peace: A Year in the Life of Caledonia Junior High – National Film Board of Canada. Producers: Peter d'Entremont, Sally Bochner, Kent Martin

=== Best Documentary Series ===
- Witness – Canadian Broadcasting Corporation. Producers: Charlotte Odele, Marie Natanson, Hilary Armstrong
- Family Dance: Tales From the Sandwich Generation – Breakthrough Entertainment. Producers: Ira Levy, Kirsten Scollie, Peter Williamson
- The Nature of Things – Canadian Broadcasting Corporation. Producers: Michael Allder, Susan Fleming
- Turning Points of History – History Television. Producers: Frank Savoie, Laszlo Barna, Alan Mendelsohn

=== Best History Documentary Program ===
- The Last Just Man – Barna-Alper Productions, Connections Productions, History Television. Producers: Laszlo Barna, Alan Mendelsohn, Frank Savoie
- Women of Courage – Eye Witness to War: The Gladys Arnold Story – Cooper Rock Pictures. Producers: Barb Campbell, Lori Kuffner
- Journey to Justice – National Film Board of Canada. Producer: Karen King
- The Notorious Mrs. Dick – Real to Reel Productions. Producer: Anne Pick
- White Thunder – National Film Board of Canada, Factory Lane Productions. Producers: Kent Martin, Annette Clarke

=== Best Biography Documentary Program ===
- Tommy...a Family Portrait – National Film Board of Canada. Producer: Kent Martin
- Life and Times – The Donald Marshall Story – 90th Parallel Productions, Canadian Broadcasting Corporation. Producers: Donna Leon, Michael Claydon
- Mama June: A Different Perspective on AIDS – May Street Productions. Producers: Hilary Pryor, Arthur Holbrook
- Ted Allan: Minstrel Boy of the 20th Century – Galafilm, National Film Board of Canada, History Television), Bravo!/CHUM. Producers: Arnie Gelbart, Adam Symansky, Sally Bochner, Elizabeth Klinck
- The Canadians: Biographies of a Nation: Aw Gee, Forgetting Me: Nell Shipman – Great North Productions. Producer: Patricia Phillips

=== Best Science, Technology, Nature, Environment or Adventure Documentary Program ===
- The Secret World of Gardens: Frogs – Bullfrog Films. Producer: Susan Fleming
- Bushmeat: The Slaughter of the Apes – Exploration Production. Producers: John Panikkar, Dawna Treibicz
- The Cold Embrace – 90th Parallel Film and Television Productions. Producers: Gordon Henderson, Andrew Gregg
- The Parkinson’s Enigma – Terra Nova Films. Producers: Terence McKeown, Bette Thompson
- Touch: The Forgotten Sense – Max Films Télévision. Producers: Jean Lemire, Roger Frappier

=== Best News Information Series ===
- the fifth estate – Canadian Broadcasting Corporation. Producers: Jim Williamson, David Studer
- Foreign Assignment – CBC Newsworld. Producers: Mark Bulgutch, Jennifer McGuire
- Frontline/CBC News: Trail of a Terrorist – Canadian Broadcasting Corporation. Producers: Alex Shprintsen, Stephen Phizicky
- Marketplace – Canadian Broadcasting Corporation. Producers: Tassie Notar, Leslie Peck
- W5 – CTV Television Network. Producers: Malcolm Fox, Anton Koschany

=== Best News Magazine Segment ===
- The National – Canadian Broadcasting Corporation. Producers: Heather Abbott, Carol Off
- CBC News: Disclosure – Canadian Broadcasting Corporation. Producers: Andreas Wesley, Anne Wright-Howard
- CBC News: Sunday – Canadian Broadcasting Corporation. Producers: Evan Solomon, Sarah Kapoor
- The National – Canadian Broadcasting Corporation. Producers: Dan Bjarnason, Brian Kelly
- W5 – CTV Television Network. Producers: Wei Chen, Marleen Trotter

=== Best Newscast ===
- The National – Canadian Broadcasting Corporation. Producers: Cynthia Kinch, Mark Harrison, Lynn Kelly, Fred Parker, Jonathan Whitten
- CTV National News – CTV News. Producers: Wendy Freeman, Margaret Spina
- CTV News at Six – CTV News. Producers: Charles Wright, Margo Harper, Joan Marshall

=== Best News Special Event Coverage ===
- CBC News Special: Attack On The U.S.A. Producers: Mark Bulgutch, Fred Parker
- @discovery.ca – September 11 – Discovery Channel. Producers: Alex Bystram, Penny Park, Jane Mingay, John Morrison
- Canada AM: September 11, 2001: Target Terrorism – CTV. Producers: Shelley Ayres, Rae Upton, Jordan Schwartz
- Canada Now: "B.C. Votes" – CBC. Producers: Wendy Williams, Dennis Matheson, Liz Hughes
- Global National: "September 11, 2001" – Global News. Producer: George Browne

=== Best Lifestyle or General Interest Series ===
- Opening Soon – Red Apple Entertainment. Producers: Rachel Low, Tim O’Brien
- Great Canadian Rivers – Good Earth Productions. Producers: Mitchell Azaria, Janice Dawe, Ihor Macijiwsky, Kristen Colle
- My Messy Bedroom – Copy Zero. Producers: Matt Zimbel, Campbell Webster
- SexTV – CHUM Television, Corus Entertainment. Producers: Marcia Martin, Pedro Orrego, Moses Znaimer
- The Surgeons – Frantic Films. Producers: Stan Lipsey, Tim O’Brien, Daniela Battistella

=== Best Practical Information Series ===
- Broken House Chronicles – Mountain Road Productions. Producer: Tim Alp
- Anything I Can Do – W Network. Producers: David C. Smith, Heather Ryall, Mag Ruffman
- Debbie Travis' Painted House – Whalley-Abbey Media Holdings. Debbie Travis, Hans Rosenstein
- Designer Guys – WestWind Pictures. Producers: Clark Donnelly, Al Magee, Mary Darling
- The Shopping Bags – Force Four Entertainment, Worldwide Bag Media. Producers: Kristina Matisic, Nikila Cole, Hugh Beard, Anna Wallner

=== Best Animated Program or Series ===
- Aaagh! It's the Mr. Hell Show! – Sextant Entertainment Group, Peafur Productions. Producers: J. Falconer, Christopher J. Brough
- Angela Anaconda – Decode Entertainment/C.O.R.E. Digital Pictures. Producers: Steven DeNure, Neil Court, Joanna Ferrone, John Mariella, Sue Rose, Beth Stevenson, Kym Hyde
- Eckhart – Phoenix Animation Studios, Catalyst Entertainment, Animation Services, Cellar Door Productions, Crumbfest Productions. Producers: Lawrie Rotenberg, David Beatty, Gretha Rose, Kevin Gillis, Nancy Chapelle, Steven Ching
- The Santa Claus Brothers – Nelvana, Film Roman, Sitting Ducks Productions, YTV. Producers: Michael Bedard, Elizabeth Daro, Patrick Loubert, Pam Lehn, Michael Hirsh, Scott Dyer, Clive A. Smith, Mark Lieber
- Yvon of the Yukon – Studio B Productions, Alliance Atlantis Communications, Corus Entertainment. Producers: Kathy Antonsen Rocchio, Blair Peters, Chris Bartleman

=== Best Pre-School Program or Series ===
- Maggie and the Ferocious Beast – Nelvana. Producers: Betty Paraskevas, Stephen Hodgins, Marianne Culbert, Patrick Loubert, Cynthia Taylor, Patricia R. Burns, Clive A. Smith, Michael Hirsh, Michael Paraskevas
- Caillou – Cookie Jar Group, Clockwork Zoo. Producers: Peter Moss, Cassandra Schafhausen
- Scoop and Doozie – Queen Bee Productions. Producer: Romney Grant
- The Nook Counting Network – TVOntario. Producers: Karen Young, Marney Berube, Laura James, Gisèle Corinthios, Marie McCann
- Wumpa's World – Cité-Amérique, CCTV. Producers: Greg Dummett, Luc Martineau

=== Best Children’s or Youth Fiction Program or Series ===
- The Famous Jett Jackson – Alliance Atlantis, Everyone is JP Kids. Producers: Shawn Levy, Kevin May, Bruce Kalish
- Incredible Story Studios – (Mind's Eye Entertainment, Vérité Films. Producers: Robert de Lint, Virginia Thompson, Kieran Corrigan, Mark Reid, Kevin DeWalt
- Mentors – Mind's Eye Entertainment, Anaid Productions). Producers: Margaret Mardirossian, Josh Miller
- Our Hero – Heroic Television, Decode Entertainment. Producers: John May, Suzanne Bolch, Karen Lee Hall
- Big Wolf on Campus – CinéGroupe, Saban Entertainment. Producers: Jacques Pettigrew, Robin Spry, Marie-Claude Beauchamp

=== Best Children's or Youth Non-Fiction Program or Series ===
- Street Cents – Canadian Broadcasting Corporation. Producers: Barbara Kennedy, Susan Rogers
- 21c – CTV Television Network. Producers: Malcolm Fox, Dominic Patten
- The NewMusic: Fight the Power: Music & Politics – MuchMusic. Producers: Paul Templeman, Tania Natscheff, Darby Wheeler
- VOX – TVOntario. Producer: Maria Farano

=== Best Sports Program or Series ===
- The Olympians – Sportsnet. Producers: Mike Brannagan, Peter Findlay, Paul Harrington
- Boxing: In and Out of the Ring – Associated Producers: David Wright, Lynn Glazier, Elliott Halpern, Ric Esther Bienstock, Pauline Duffy, Jack Rabinovitch
- Hockey Night in Canada – Hockey Day in Canada – CBC Sports. Producers: Chris Irwin, Joel Darling
- Legends of Hockey: A Personal Journey – Network Entertainment. Producers: Derik Murray, John Hamilton
- Shinny: The Hockey in All of Us – National Film Board of Canada. Producer: Gerry Flahive

=== Best Live Sporting Event ===
- Hockey Night in Canada – First Saturday of the 50th Season – CBC Sports. Producers: Paul Graham, Joel Darling, Dan Bjarnason
- 2001 World Championships in Athletics – Sportsnet. Producer: Mike Brannagan
- 89th Grey Cup Championship – Canadian Broadcasting Corporation. Producers: Ron Forsythe, Mike Brannagan, Don Peppin

== Direction awards ==
=== Best Direction in a Dramatic Program or Mini-Series ===
- Jerry Ciccoritti – Trudeau (Big Motion Pictures)
- Stacey Stewart Curtis – North of 60 – Dreamstorm (Seven24 Films)
- Laurie Lynd – I Was a Rat (Catalyst Entertainment/BBC Children's Drama)
- Alex Chapple – Torso: The Evelyn Dick Story (Shaftesbury Films)
- Philip Spink – Voyage of the Unicorn (Bassett Productions/RHI Entertainment/RTL Group/Sextant Entertainment/UFA GmbH)

=== Best Direction in a Dramatic Series ===
- John Fawcett – Da Vinci’s Inquest (Haddock Entertainment/Barna-Alper Productions/Alliance Atlantis) Productions/CBC)
- Don McBrearty – Blue Murder (Barna-Alper Productions/Canwest/North Bend Films)
- Bill Corcoran – Cold Squad (Keatley MacLeod Productions/Atlantis Films)
- Chris Haddock – Da Vinci’s Inquest (Haddock Entertainment/Barna-Alper Productions/Alliance Atlantis Productions/CBC)
- Kelly Makin – The Associates (Alliance Atlantis)

=== Best Direction in an Information Program or Series ===
- Catherine Legge – CBC News: Disclosure (CBC)
- Claude Vickery – the fifth estate (CBC)
- Tamar Weinstein – the fifth estate (CBC)
- John Webb – CBC News: Disclosure (CBC)
- Ryszard Hunka – CBC News: Disclosure (CBC)

=== Best Direction in a Documentary Program ===
- Steven Silver – The Last Just Man (Barna-Alper Productions/Connections Productions/History Television)
- Stan Feingold – Heroines (Peace Arch Entertainment)
- Barry Stevens – Offspring (Barna-Alper Productions)
- Susan Teskey – Canada: A People's History – The Crucible 1940–1946 (CBC)
- Matt Gallagher – Tyler’s Barrel (Take3 Productions)

=== Best Direction in a Documentary Series ===
- Susan Fleming – The Secret World of Gardens (Bullfrog Films)
- Barri Cohen, Karen Shopsowitz – Family Dance: Tales From the Sandwich Generation (Breakthrough Entertainment)
- Terence McKenna – Life and Times (90th Parallel Productions/CBC)
- Daniel Zuckerbrot – Circus (Great North Productions)
- Dennis Heaton, Audrey Mehler – KinK (Paperny Entertainment)

=== Best Direction in a Comedy Program or Series ===
- John Greyson – Made in Canada – Roomies (Salter Street Films/Island Edge)
- Henry Sarwer-Foner – Made in Canada – Damacles, Time Traveler (Salter Street Films/Island Edge)
- Stephen Reynolds – Made in Canada – The War of 1812 (Salter Street Films/Island Edge)
- Henry Sarwer-Foner – Made in Canada – Trojan Horse (Salter Street Films/Island Edge)
- Greg Lawrence – The Endless Grind (The Comedy Network)
- Henry Sarwer-Foner – This Hour Has 22 Minutes (Salter Street Films/CBC)

=== Best Direction in a Variety Program or Series ===
- Kim Hyde, Rick Green – History Bites (The History Channel)
- Joan Tosoni – Juno Awards of 2002 (Canadian Academy of Recording Arts and Sciences/CTV)
- Ron Murphy, Joan Tosoni – Sonic Temple, Episode 4 (CTV)
- Bob Haller – MovieTelevision's Festival Schmooze (Citytv)
- Mario Rouleau – Yaa! To the M@X Grand Finale (YTV)

=== Best Direction in a Performing Arts Program or Series ===
- Guy Maddin – Dracula: Pages from a Virgin's Diary (Vonnie Von Helmut Film/CBC/Royal Winnipeg Ballet)
- Larry Weinstein – Ravel’s Brain (Rhombus Media/Idéale Audience/Yle TV1)
- Drew Mullin – Fire Dance
- Mark Adam, Veronica Tennant – The Dancer's Story: The National Ballet of Canada (Sound Venture Productions)
- Morris Panych – The Overcoat (Principia Productions/Rhobus International)

== Writing awards ==
=== Best Writing in a Dramatic Program or Mini-Series ===
- Wayne Grigsby – Trudeau (Big Motion Pictures)
- Donna Morrissey – Clothesline Patch (Patch Productions)
- Elizabeth Stewart, Michael Amo – Tagged: The Jonathan Wamback Story (Salter Street Films/Tapestry Pictures)
- Jacob Krueger, John Wierick – The Matthew Shepard Story (Alliance Atlantis/CTV/Cosmic Entertainment)
- Andrew Wreggitt – Dream Storm (Alberta Filmworks)

=== Best Writing in a Dramatic Series ===
- Chris Haddock, Alan Di Fiore – Da Vinci’s Inquest (Haddock Entertainment/Barna-Alper Productions/Alliance Atlantis/CBC)
- Peter Mitchell – Cold Squad (Keatley MacLeod Productions/Atlantis Films)
- Frank Borg – Da Vinci’s Inquest (Haddock Entertainment/Barna-Alper Productions/Alliance Atlantis/CBC)
- Maureen McKeon – The Associates (Alliance Atlantis)

=== Best Writing in a Comedy or Variety Program or Series ===
- Rick Mercer – Made in Canada – Damacles, Time Traveler (Salter Street Films/Island Edge)
- Alex Galatis – Made in Canada – Roomies (Salter Street Films/Island Edge)
- Mark Farrell – Made in Canada – Everyone’s a Critic (Salter Street Films/Island Edge)
- Edward Riche – Made in Canada – Creative Bookkeeping (Salter Street Films/Island Edge)
- Edward Riche – Made in Canada – The War of 1812 (Salter Street Films/Island Edge)

=== Best Writing in an Information Program or Series ===
- Terence McKenna – Trail of a Terrorist (CBC)
- Linden MacIntyre – the fifth estate (CBC)
- Diana Swain – CBC News: Disclosure (CBC)
- Chris Knight – The Great Canadian Food Show (CBC)

=== Best Writing in a Documentary Program or Series ===
- Steven Silver, Barry Stevens – The Last Just Man (Barna-Alper Productions/Connections Productions/History Television)
- Bill Cameron – My Father's Camera (NFB)
- Helen Slinger – On Wings and Dreams (CBC/Bountiful Films)
- Gilbert Reid – For King and Empire (History Television/Knowledge Network/Millennium Bureau of Canada/Saskatchewan Communications Network)
- Josh Freed, Miro Cernetig – Juggling Dreams (Galafilm)
- Karen Shopsowitz – My Father's Camera (NFB)

== Performance awards ==
=== Best Performance by an Actor in a Leading Role in a Dramatic Program or Mini-Series ===
- Colm Feore – Trudeau (Big Motion Pictures)
- Shawn Doyle – A Killing Spring (Shaftesbury Films/CTV)
- Colm Meaney – Random Passage (Cité-Amérique/Blue Heaven Productions/Full Works Media Productions/Subotica Films)
- Tyler Hynes – Tagged: The Jonathan Wamback Story (Salter Street Films/Tapestry Pictures)
- Michael Ironside – The Last Chapter (Morningstar Entertainment)

=== Best Performance by an Actress in a Leading Role in a Dramatic Program or Mini-Series ===
- Aoife McMahon – Random Passage (Cité-Amérique/Blue Heaven Productions/Full Works Media Productions/Subotica Films)
- Kathleen Robertson – Torso: The Evelyn Dick Story (Shaftesbury Films)
- Wendy Crewson – A Killing Spring (Shaftesbury Films/CTV)
- Barbara Garrick – Further Tales of the City (Productions Bleu Blanc Rouge)
- Pascale Montpetit – The Stork Derby (Muse Entertainment)

=== Best Performance by an Actor in a Continuing Leading Dramatic Role ===
- Donnelly Rhodes – Da Vinci’s Inquest (Haddock Entertainment/Barna-Alper Productions/Alliance Atlantis/CBC)
- Maurice Dean Wint – Blue Murder – Death and Taxes (Barna-Alper Productions/Canwest/North Bend Films)
- Martin Cummins – Dice – Episode 1 (Cité-Amérique/Showcase)
- John Shea – Mutant X (Fireworks Entertainment/Marvel Studios/Global Television Network)
- Demore Barnes – The Associates (Alliance Atlantis)

=== Best Performance by an Actress in a Continuing Leading Dramatic Role ===
- Julie Stewart – Cold Squad (Keatley MacLeod Productions/Atlantis Films)
- Venus Terzo – Da Vinci’s Inquest (Haddock Entertainment/Barna-Alper Productions/Alliance Atlantis/CBC)
- Victoria Snow – Paradise Falls (Breakthrough Entertainment)
- Janet Kidder – Tom Stone – Solidarity Forever (Seven24 Films/Alberta Filmworks/CBC)
- Tamara Hickey – The Associates (Alliance Atlantis)

=== Best Performance by an Actor in a Guest Role Dramatic Series ===
- Tom Scholte – Da Vinci’s Inquest (Haddock Entertainment/Barna-Alper Productions/Alliance Atlantis/CBC)
- Michael Riley – The Associates (Alliance Atlantis)
- Peter Stebbings – Blue Murder – Asylum (Barna-Alper Productions/Canwest/North Bend Films)
- Ron Gabriel – Blue Murder (Barna-Alper Productions/Canwest/North Bend Films)
- Randy Hughson – Blue Murder (Barna-Alper Productions/Canwest/North Bend Films)

=== Best Performance by an Actress in a Guest Role Dramatic Series ===
- Julia Chantrey – Blue Murder (Barna-Alper Productions/Canwest/North Bend Films)
- Keegan Connor Tracy – Da Vinci’s Inquest (Haddock Entertainment/Barna-Alper Productions/Alliance Atlantis/CBC)
- Kristin Lehman – Andromeda (Fireworks Entertainment/Tribune Entertainment/BLT Productions/Global/MBR Productions)
- Gabrielle Rose – Tom Stone – Dead Dog Rain (Seven24 Films/Alberta Filmworks/CBC)
- Waneta Storms – Blue Murder (Barna-Alper Productions/Canwest/North Bend Films)
- Ellie Harvie – Cold Squad (Keatley MacLeod Productions/Atlantis Films)

=== Best Performance by an Actor in a Featured Supporting Role in a Dramatic Series ===
- Garry Chalk – Cold Squad (Keatley MacLeod Productions/Atlantis Films)
- Sam Waterston – The Matthew Shepard Story (Alliance Atlantis/CTV/Cosmic Entertainment)
- Michel Forget – The Last Chapter (Morningstar Entertainment)
- Ron White – Tagged: The Jonathan Wamback Story (Salter Street Films/Tapestry Pictures)
- Jean Marchand – Trudeau (Big Motion Pictures)
- Guy Richer – Trudeau (Big Motion Pictures)

=== Best Performance by an Actress in a Featured Supporting Role in a Dramatic Series ===
- Dixie Seatle – Paradise Falls (Breakthrough Entertainment)
- Tamara Craig Thomas – Cold Squad – The Needle and the Debutant (Keatley MacLeod Productions/Atlantis Films)
- Lauren Lee Smith – Mutant X (Fireworks Entertainment/Marvel Studios/Global Television Network)
- Marnie McPhail – The Associates (Alliance Atlantis)
- Rebecca Jenkins – The Associates (Alliance Atlantis)

=== Best Performance by an Actor in a Featured Supporting Role in a Dramatic Program or Mini-Series ===
- Sam Waterston – The Matthew Shepard Story (Alliance Atlantis/CTV/Cosmic Entertainment)
- Michel Forget – The Last Chapter (Morningstar Entertainment)
- Garry Chalk – Cold Squad – (Keatley MacLeod Productions/Atlantis Films)
- Ron White – Tagged: The Jonathan Wamback Story (Salter Street Films/Tapestry Pictures)
- Jean Marchand – Trudeau (Big Motion Pictures)
- Guy Richer – Trudeau (Big Motion Pictures)

=== Best Performance by an Actress in a Featured Supporting Role in a Dramatic Program or Mini-Series ===
- Jackie Burroughs – Further Tales of the City (Productions Bleu Blanc Rouge)
- Sherry Miller – A Killing Spring (Shaftesbury Films/CTV)
- Deborah Pollitt – Random Passage (Cité-Amérique/Blue Heaven Productions/Full Works Media Productions/Subotica Films)
- Brenda Fricker – Torso: The Evelyn Dick Story (Shaftesbury Films)
- Céline Bonnier – The Last Chapter (Morningstar Entertainment)

=== Best Individual Performance in a Comedy Program or Series ===
- Bette MacDonald – Halifax Comedy Festival (CBC)
- Nikki Payne – Halifax Comedy Festival (CBC)
- Peter Keleghan – Air Farce Live (CBC)
- Jayne Eastwood – The Endless Grind (The Comedy Network)

=== Best Ensemble Performance in a Comedy Program or Series ===
- Dan Lett, Peter Keleghan, Rick Mercer, Jackie Torrens, Leah Pinsent – Made in Canada – Damacles, Time Traveler (Salter Street Films/Island Edge)
- Colin Mochrie, Greg Thomey – This Hour Has 22 Minutes (Salter Street Films/CBC)
- Sandi Ross, Cory Bowles, Sarah Dunsworth-Nickerson, Lucy DeCoutere, John Dunsworth, Mike Smith, John Paul Tremblay, Ardon Bess, Barrie Dunn, Michael Jackson, Jonathan Torrens, Jeanna Harrison, Robb Wells, Patrick Roach – Trailer Park Boys (Showcase, Topsail Entertainment)

=== Best Performance or Host in a Variety Program or Series ===
- Tyler Stewart, Kevin Hearn, Ed Robertson, Steven Page, Jim Creeggan – Juno Awards of 2002 (Canadian Academy of Recording Arts and Sciences/CTV)
- Terri Clark – 2001 Canadian Country Music Awards (Canadian Country Music Association/CBC)
- Anne Murray, Leahy: Erin Leahy, Donnell Leahy, Doug Leahy, Agnes Enright, Angus Leahy, Denise Flack, Julie Leahy, Frank Leahy, Maria Leahy – Anne Murray: What a Wonderful Christmas (CBC)
- David Gale – Loving Spoonfuls: Holiday Special (W Network)
- Ashley MacIsaac, Denise Dufresne, Aaron Young, Lynae Oliver, Charles Bulbugh, Bob Fenske, Errol Fischer, Allison Granger, Michael Benac, Josh Zubot, Bobby Lalonde, Roxanne Leitch, Nathan Pilatzke, Jon Pilatzke, Tim Harley – The Thrill on the Hill: Canada Day 2001 (CBC)

=== Best Performance in a Performing Arts Program or Series ===
- Naomi Stikeman, Zofia Tujaka, Jason Shipley-Holmes, Mirko Hecktor – Montreal Dance (CBC)
- Tara Birtwhistle – Dracula: Pages from a Virgin's Diary (Vonnie Von Helmut Film/CBC/Royal Winnipeg Ballet)
- Susan Platts – Opening Night (CBC)
- Peter Anderson – The Overcoat (Principia Productions/Rhobus International)
- Julia Aplin – Rings of Saturn (Mossanen Productions)

=== Best Performance in a Preschool Program or Series ===
- Chris Knight, James Rankin – Scoop and Doozie (Queen Bee Productions)
- Michael Clark, Alyson Court – Get Set For Life (CBC Kids/Canadian Living Magazine)
- Charles Schott – Polka Dot Shorts (TVOntario)
- Don Austen, John Eccleston, Brian Herring, Julie Westwood, Wim Booth, Rebecca Nagan, Gillie Robic – The Hoobs (The Jim Henson Company/Decode Entertainment)
- Gisèle Corinthios – The Nook Counting Network (TVOntario)

=== Best Performance in a Children’s or Youth Program or Series ===
- Gordon Greene – The Famous Jett Jackson (Alliance Atlantis/Everyone is JP Kids)
- Mark Rendall – Tales from the Neverending Story (Dieter Geissler Filmproduktion, MGI Films, Medien Capital Treuhand, Muse Entertainment, Movie Factory Film)
- Gary Farmer – Screech Owls – Sacred Ground (Oasis Pictures/Shaftesbury Films/YTV/Corus Entertainment)
- Jonathan Malen – Screech Owls – Face Off (Oasis Pictures/Shaftesbury Films/YTV/Corus Entertainment)
- Eric Peterson – Screech Owls (Oasis Pictures/Shaftesbury Films/YTV/Corus Entertainment)

== Journalism awards ==
=== Best News Anchor ===
- Peter Mansbridge – The National (CBC)
- Lloyd Robertson – CTV National News (CTV News)
- Kevin Newman – Global National (Global Television Network)

=== Best Reportage ===
- Patrick Brown – The National (CBC)
- Céline Galipeau – The National (CBC)
- Rodney Palmer – CTV National News – Al Aqsa Martyrs Brigade (CTV News)
- Alan Fryer – CTV National News – Jamaica Protests (CTV News)
- Tom Kennedy – CTV National News – Northern Alliance (CTV News)

=== Best Host or Interviewer in a News Information, Talk, or Lifestyle/General Interest Program or Series ===
- Mark Kelley – CBC News: Newsworld Morning – (CBC)
- Diana Swain, Hans Rosenstein – CBC News: Disclosure (CBC)
- Tom Harrington – Sports Journal (CBC Sports)
- Chris Hyndman, Steven Sabados – Designer Guys (WestWind Pictures)
- David Gale – Loving Spoonfuls: Holiday Special (W Network)
- Steve Paikin – Studio 2 (TVOntario)

=== Best Host or Interviewer in a Practical Information, or Performing Arts Program or Series ===
- Martin Galloway – The Secret World of Gardens (Bullfrog Films)
- Nik Manojlovich – Savoir Faire Specials (Primevista Television)
- Mag Ruffman – Anything I Can Do (W Network)
- Marilyn Denis – CityLine (Citytv)
- Sarah Richardson – Room Service (Nordisk Film & TV)

=== Best Sportscaster/Anchor ===
- Ron MacLean – 2002 Olympic Winter Games (CBC Sports)
- Don Wittman – 2001 World Championships in Athletics (Sportsnet)
- Geoffrey Gowan – 2001 World Championships in Athletics (Sportsnet)
- Brian Williams – 2002 Olympic Winter Games (CBC Sports)
- Bob Cole – 2002 Olympic Winter Games (CBC Sports)

== Craft awards ==
=== Best Photography in a Dramatic Program or Series ===
- Pierre Letarte – Random Passage (Cité-Amérique/Blue Heaven Productions/Full Works Media Productions/Subotica Films)
- Stan Barua – Baba’s House (Flashfire Productions/Painted Egg Productions)
- Gordon Verheul – Andromeda (Fireworks Entertainment/Tribune Entertainment/BLT Productions/Global/MBR Productions)
- Nikos Evdemon – Torso: The Evelyn Dick Story (Shaftesbury Films)
- Gavin Smith – Degrassi: The Next Generation – The Degrassi Reunion Special (Bell Fund/CTV/Epitome Pictures)

=== Best Photography in a Comedy, Variety, Performing Arts Program or Series ===
- Roger Vernon – Trio (Opera Films)
- David Greene – Fire Dance
- Steve Baird – The Guess Who: The Concert (CBC, Midcan Production Services, Saifer Entertainment, ViK. Recordings, YaYo Productions)
- Robert Aschmann – The Overcoat (Principia Productions/Rhobus International)
- Michael Powers – Music Works (CBC Television)

=== Best Photography in an Information Program or Series ===
- Colin Allison – the fifth estate (Canadian Broadcasting Corporation|CBC)
- Maurice Chabot – The National: "Trail of a Terrorist" (CBC)
- Keith Page – Daily Planet (Discovery Channel)
- Joel Hartway – Daily Planet (Discovery Channel)
- Allan Leader – Daily Planet (Discovery Channel)
- Ihor Macijiwsky – Great Canadian Rivers – Good Earth Productions.

=== Best Photography in a Documentary Program or Series ===
- John Westheuser, Walter Corbett – Graveyard Shift – Night Crossings (White Pine Pictures)
- Paul Nolan – Life and Times – The Donald Marshall Story (90th Parallel Productions/CBC)
- Sylvaine Dufaux – Touch: The Forgotten Sense (Max Films Télévision)
- Michael Grippo – Shinny: The Hockey in All of Us (NFB)
- Marlon Paul – The Surgeons (Frantic Films)

=== Best Visual Effects ===
- Tom Archer, Lee Wilson, Stephen Pepper, Simon van de Lagemaat, Winston Helgason, Lisa K. Sepp – Voyage of the Unicorn, Ep 1 (Bassett Productions/RHI Entertainment/RTL Group/Sextant Entertainment/UFA GmbH)
- Tom Tennisco, Robert Biagi, Geoff Anderson, Jim Finn – Andromeda (Fireworks Entertainment/Tribune Entertainment/BLT Productions/Global/MBR Productions)
- Steve D’Onofrio, Jeff Krebs, Stephen Roloff, Brian Lui, Ian Britton, Graham Cunningham, Ariel Joson, Derek Lang – Earth: Final Conflict (Atlantis Films)
- Doug Campbell, Shannon Gurney, Brian Harder, James Tichenor, Tom Bryden, Michelle Comens, Kyle Yoneda, Craig Van Den Biggelaar, Bruce Woloshyn – Stargate SG-1 – Enemies (Stargate SG-1 Productions)
- Benoit Brière, Patrick Faille, Nathalie Girard, Balin Hewitt – Tales from the Neverending Story -The Resurrection (Dieter Geissler Filmproduktion, MGI Films, Medien Capital Treuhand, Muse Entertainment, Movie Factory Film)

=== Best Picture Editing in a Dramatic Program or Series ===
- Dean Soltys – Trudeau (Big Motion Pictures)
- Jane Morrison – Da Vinci’s Inquest (Haddock Entertainment/Barna-Alper Productions/Alliance Atlantis/CBC)
- Claude Palardy – The Last Chapter (Morningstar Entertainment)
- Tony Papa – ICE: Beyond Cool (Avanti Pictures/CBC Television)
- Jeff Warren – Tagged: The Jonathan Wamback Story (Salter Street Films/Tapestry Pictures)

=== Best Picture Editing in a Comedy, Variety, Performing Arts Program or Series ===
- David New- Ravel’s Brain (Rhombus Media/Idéale Audience/Yle TV1)
- Alan MacLean – Made in Canada – Damacles, Time Traveler (Salter Street Films/Island Edge)
- Michael John Bateman – The Overcoat (Principia Productions/Rhobus International)
- Michael Lloyd – The Guess Who: The Concert (CBC, Midcan Production Services, Saifer Entertainment, ViK. Recordings, YaYo Productions)
- Rik Morden – Trio (Opera Films)

=== Best Picture Editing in an Information Program or Series ===
- Julian Lannaman – Studio 2 (TVOntario)
- Vance Tschritter, Bridget Cascone, Liz Rosch – Fashion File (CBC Television)
- Jim France – Love by Design (HGTV)
- Roger Lefebvre – On the Road Again (CBC)
- Elizabeth Cabral – The NewMusic (MuchMusic)

=== Best Picture Editing in a Documentary Program or Series ===
- Tharanga Ramanayake – Naked in the House: A Photographic Competition (Fashion Television)
- Bonnie Devlin – Culture Jam: Hijacking Commercial Culture (Reel Myth Productions)
- Sarah Bachinski – The Last Just Man (Barna-Alper Productions/Connections Productions/History Television)
- John Gurdebeke – The Notorious Mrs. Armstrong (Buffalo Gal Pictures)
- Manfred Becker – Thin Ice (NFB)

=== Best Production Design or Art Direction in a Dramatic Program or Series ===
- Ken MacDonald – The Overcoat (Principia Productions/Rhobus International)
- Donna Noonan – Bliss – Voice (Galafilm/Back Alley Film Productions)
- Normand Sarazin – Random Passage (Cité-Amérique/Blue Heaven Productions/Full Works Media Productions/Subotica Films)
- Armando Sgrignuoli, Sandra Kybartas – Torso: The Evelyn Dick Story (Shaftesbury Films)
- Greg Loewen, Gary Myers, Penny A. Chambers, Graeme Murray – Voyage of the Unicorn (Bassett Productions/RHI Entertainment/RTL Group/Sextant Entertainment/UFA GmbH)

=== Best Production Design or Art Direction in a Non-Dramatic Program or Series ===
- Ambre Fernandez – Ravel’s Brain (Rhombus Media/Idéale Audience/Yle TV1)
- Stephen Osler – This Hour Has 22 Minutes (Salter Street Films/CBC)
- Clyde Klotz – Don't Eat the Neighbours (Sextant Entertainment)
- Deanne Rohde – Dracula: Pages from a Virgin's Diary (Vonnie Von Helmut Film/CBC/Royal Winnipeg Ballet)
- Tom Anthes – East Coast Music Awards (East Coast Music Association/CBC Halifax)

=== Best Costume Design ===
- Renée April – Tales from the Neverending Story – The Resurrection (Dieter Geissler Filmproduktion/MGI Films/Medien Capital Treuhand/Muse Entertainment/Movie Factory Film)
- Michèle Hamel – Random Passage (Cité-Amérique/Blue Heaven Productions/Full Works Media Productions/Subotica Films)
- Nancy Bryant – The Overcoat (Principia Productions/Rhobus International)
- Luc Beland – The Royal Scandal (Muse Entertainment)
- Linda Muir – Torso: The Evelyn Dick Story (Shaftesbury Films)

=== Best Achievement in Make-Up ===
- Francesca von Zimmermann, Ryan Nicholson – Andromeda (Fireworks Entertainment/Tribune Entertainment/BLT Productions/Global/MBR Productions)
- Sue Upton, Karen Byers – This Hour Has 22 Minutes (Salter Street Films/CBC)
- Marilyn O’Quinn, Cindy Lou Tache – The Associates (Alliance Atlantis)
- Lise Juhr, Todd Masters, Brad Proctor, Jan Newman, Holland Miller, Christopher Mark Pinhey – Stargate SG-1 (Stargate SG-1 Productions)
- Sue Upton – The Gavin Crawford Show (Idle Mind Productions/Shaftesbury Films)

=== Best Sound in a Dramatic Program ===
- Paul Williamson, John Gare, Robert Fletcher, Steven Toepell, Marvyn Dennis, John Dunsworth, Steve Hammond – Torso: The Evelyn Dick Story (Shaftesbury Films)
- Jacqueline Cristianini, Kirby Jinnah, James Wallace, Iain Pattison, Devan Kraushar, Paul A. Sharpe – Voyage of the Unicorn (Bassett Productions/RHI Entertainment/RTL Group/Sextant Entertainment/UFA GmbH)
- Todd Araki, Marcel Dupperreault, Kirk Furniss, Jason Frederickson – ReBoot: Daemon Rising (Mainframe Studios/BLT Productions/Alliance Atlantis)
- Richard Betanzos, Ghislaine Grenier, Glenn Tussman, Michael Gurman, Michelle Cloutier, Shaun-Nicholas Gallagher – Tales from the Neverending Story – The Resurrection (Dieter Geissler Filmproduktion/MGI Films/Medien Capital Treuhand/Muse Entertainment/Movie Factory Film)
- Michael Baskerville, Jamie Sulek, Wayne Swingle, Herwig Gayer, Barry Gilmore, Steve Hammond – Tagged: The Jonathan Wamback Story (Salter Street Films/Tapestry Pictures)

=== Best Sound in a Dramatic Series ===
- Jill Purdy, Steve Baine, Scott Shepherd, Mark Gingras, Allen Ormerod, Rose Gregoris, Mark Vogelsang, Dan Daniels – Mutant X – The Shock of the New (Fireworks Entertainment/Marvel Studios/Global Television Network)
- Cam Wagner, Rick Bal, Bill Mellow, Mike Olekshy, Kevin Townshend, Jacqueline Cristianini, Kelly Cole – Cold Squad (Keatley MacLeod Productions/Atlantis Films)
- Janice Ierulli, Mark Shnuriwsky, Brian Whitty, Mark Wright, Goro Koyama, Michele Crook, Don Dickson – Foreign Objects – Chaos and Order (Rhombus Media)
- Ian Rankin, John Douglas Smith, Steve Baine, Orest Sushko, Ian Hendry, Tom Bjelic – Earth: Final Conflict (Atlantis Films)
- John Laing, Steve Baine, Joe Lafontaine, Elius Caruso, Brad Zoern, Robert Sherer, Kevin Banks, Stephen Barden – Tracker – Episode 101 (Modern Entertainment/Future Film Group/Lionsgate Television)

=== Best Sound in a Comedy, Variety, or Performing Arts Program or Series ===
- Lou Solakofski, Goro Koyama, Jane Tattersall, David McCallum, Peter Cook – Ravel’s Brain (Rhombus Media/Idéale Audience/Yle TV1)
- Kent Ford, Ian Dunbar, Bob Paley, Simon Bowers, Doug McClement, Marc Laliberté – Juno Awards of 2002 (Canadian Academy of Recording Arts and Sciences/CTV)
- Kirk Furniss, Jason Frederickson, Todd Araki, Marcel Dupperreault – ReBoot: My Two Bobs (Mainframe Studios/BLT Productions/Alliance Atlantis)
- David Horner, Ian Emberton, Gael MacLean – The Overcoat (Principia Productions/Rhobus International)

=== Best Sound in an Information/Documentary Program or Series ===
- Dwayne Newman, Geoff Raffan – Canadian Geographic Presents: Immortals of the Arctic (Royal Canadian Geographical Society)
- Harvey Hyslop – White Thunder (National Film Board of Canada/Factory Lane Productions)
- Michael Nunan – After the Fall (Bell Media)
- Brent Marchenski, Mario Loubert, Ewan Deane, Marc Benoit – Love and Duty: Canadian Red Cross Women in WWII (Infinity Films)

=== Best Original Music Score for a Program or Mini-Series ===
- Jeff Danna, Mychael Danna – The Matthew Shepard Story (Alliance Atlantis/CTV/Cosmic Entertainment)
- Patrick Roach, Christopher Dedrick – Torso: The Evelyn Dick Story (Shaftesbury Films)
- John Welsman – Stolen Miracle (Portfolio Entertainment/CTV)
- Michel Cusson – The Last Chapter (Morningstar Entertainment)
- Daryl Bennett, Jim Guttridge – Voyage of the Unicorn (Bassett Productions/RHI Entertainment/RTL Group/Sextant Entertainment/UFA GmbH)

=== Best Original Music Score for a Dramatic Series ===
- James Jandrisch – Cold Squad (Keatley MacLeod Productions/Atlantis Films)
- Lou Natale – Mutant X (Fireworks Entertainment/Marvel Studios/Global Television Network)
- Jack Procher, Daniel Fernandez – Redwall (Nelvana/Molitor Productions/TV-Loonland AG)
- Donald Quan – Relic Hunter – Dagger of Death (CHUM/ProSiebenSat.1 Media/M6/Rysher Entertainment/Gaumont/Fireworks Entertainment)
- Steve London – The Ripping Friends – The Man From Next Thursday (Spümcø/Cambium/Animagic)

=== Best Original Music Score for a Documentary Program or Series ===
- Victor Davies – Honour Before Glory (Anthony Sherwood Productions)
- Eric Robertson, Claude Desjardins – Canada: A People's History (CBC)

== Special awards ==
- Gordon Sinclair Award for Broadcast Journalism – Dennis McIntosh
- Earle Grey Award – Greg Malone, Andy Jones, Tommy Sexton
- Margaret Collier Award – Patrick Watson
- Gemini Award for Outstanding Technical Achievement – Tharanga Ramanayake – CTV Gateway
- Canada Award: Karen King, Cyrus Sundar Singh – Film Club
- Academy Achievement Award – Trina McQueen
- Royal Canadian Mint's Viewer's Choice Award – John Morgan, Luba Goy, Don Ferguson, Roger Abbott – Air Farce Live
- Gemini Humanitarian Award: Wendy Crewson
- Geminis' Hottest Star: Gordon Michael Woolvett
- Gemini Award for Most Popular Website Competition: Dan Fill, Neil Court, Steve Denure, Beth Stevenson: Undergrads
- Gemini Award for Most Innovative Website: Raja Khanna, Roma Khanna, Stephen Stohn, Linda Schuyler: Degrassi: The Next Generation
- Special Award for Outstanding Contribution to Canadian Television: CBC Television
