= List of Made in Canada episodes =

The Canadian sitcom Made in Canada aired from 1998 to 2003 on CBC Television.

== Series overview ==
Season	Episodes	Originally released	
Season	Episodes	First released	Last released
1	6	October 5, 1998	November 9, 1998
2	13	October 4, 1999	January 24, 2000
3	13	October 16, 2000	February 26, 2001
4	16	October 12, 2001	March 22, 2002
5	17	January 10, 2003	June 20, 2003

== Season 1 ==
All six episodes of the first season were written by Mark Farrell and Rick Mercer, and were directed by Henry Sarwer-Foner.

No.	Title	Original release date	Prod. code
1	"Pawn to King Four"	October 5, 1998	1-01
Pyramid is hosting a party to celebrate 45 episodes of Sword of Damacles, and the announcement of 20 more shows, but star Michael Rushton doesn't want to sign for another season. Richard Strong and Siobhan Roy successfully plot to get Richard promoted to head of television development by getting Raymond drunk and making it look like he sexually assaulted Siobhan.
2	"Dining Out"	October 12, 1998	1-02
After Alan gives Victor some of Veronica's authority, Veronica and Richard scheme against Victor and Lisa.
3	"A Death in the Family"	October 19, 1998	1-03
Walter Franklin (Gordon Pinsent), the star of Beaver Creek, dies during hair transplant surgery in Mexico, and the team has to devise a means to save the show and keep the company's stock from plummeting.
4	"Second in Command"	October 26, 1998	1-04
Alan gives Richard twelve hours to develop a series about cops working undercover inside the prison system for NBC. The star of Victor's movie project is being difficult on set.
5	"The Mill Show"	November 2, 1998	1-05
Richard is taken off the cop show project and is given a "mill show" (a cheap daily assembly line-type show) to quickly conceive and produce.
6	"Gemini Night"	November 9, 1998	1-06
Alan is being presented with a lifetime achievement award at the Gemini Awards ceremony, but can't settle on a speech. Siobhan plots to get Raymond rehired at Pyramid so she can get a role in his new show. Richard is fired after the team finds him and Siobhan having sex on the conference room table.

== Season 2 ==
No.	Title	Directed by	Written by	Original release date	Prod. code
7	"Merger"	Henry Sarwer-Foner	Mark Farrell and Rick Mercer	October 4, 1999	2-01
Richard has a production assistant job on a children's show at the competing Prodigy Productions, where he discredits his new boss so that Alan becomes CEO when Pyramid-Prodigy merge in a leveraged takeover. The episode parodies the real Alliance Atlantis merger.
8	"New Office"	Henry Sarwer-Foner	Mark Farrell and Rick Mercer	October 11, 1999	2-02
Alan fires the redundant staff and has Richard and Victor encourage a vice president to quit, but this jeopardizes their chances to acquire a new Kiefer Sutherland project.
9	"Damacles Directs"	Henry Sarwer-Foner	Ed Macdonald	October 18, 1999	2-03
Michael Rushton wants to direct an episode of Sword of Damacles per his contract, which is further complicated when Siobhan is promised to guest star. Victor's nephew Ted (Dov Tiefenbach) visits while on a break from drug rehab, and overshadows Victor by proposing a new media division.
10	"Buy the Book"	Stephen Reynolds	Ed Riche	October 25, 1999	2-04
Beaver Creek receives an award from a conservative media watchdog group for promoting family values, just days before two of its stars plan to come out as gay by marching in character during the Toronto Pride Parade. Victor tries to intercede but makes things worse, and the gay community organizes a protest in front of the company's office. Richard convinces Alan to buy an option on an unpublished book, which turns out to be terrible.
11	"For the Children"	Michael Kennedy	Alex Galatis	November 1, 1999	2-05
Victor's merchandising deal for children's show Captain McGee is jeopardized when the star is found to be a wife swapper with his girlfriend. The staff try to sell Beaver Creek to a German TV executive who thinks it is a sexier version of Dawson's Creek.
12	"It's a Science"	Jerry Ciccoritti	Ed Richie and Alex Ganetakos	November 8, 1999	2-06
Murray, Pyramid's first head writer, claims that he created Sword of Damacles and demands royalty payments. He is sequestered at the Church of Spirentology, and Alan sends Victor to convince Murray to drop the claim, but Victor is also drawn into the church. Richard and Veronica spread rumours about each other as they are interviewed for the same executive position in a new studio. Alan is preoccupied by a grey hair.
13	"Diva"	Jerry Ciccoritti	Ray Storey	November 15, 1999	2-07
Legendary Hollywood actress Dian Del Largo (Margot Kidder) agrees to appear on Beaver Creek during sweeps week, but she proves to be a diva who fires half the show's production staff. She suffers an anxiety attack on camera and Richard is forced to call in Gino Empry to get things back on track.
14	"Connect the Dots"	Henry Sarwer-Foner	Mark Farrell	November 22, 1999	2-08
Alan misapplies techniques from a new book on management. He assigns Richard the task of working an Asian character into Beaver Creek to sell it to American audiences, and causes Veronica to think she's about to be fired.
15	"Life in the Woods"	Michael Kennedy	Edward Riche	November 29, 1999	2-09
After watching an episode of Beaver Creek for the first time and deciding that it's awful, Alan tasks the executives with overhauling the show. Given notes for more "peril" while restricted by budget, they consider a location shoot in a nearby woods but actor Geoff becomes lost. Meanwhile, Alan promotes Pyramid to a potential investor at a charity golf tournament.
16	"The Christmas Show"	Stephen Reynolds	Rick Mercer	December 6, 1999	2-10
Alan impulsively cancels Christmas at Pyramid, destroying office morale and attracting media criticism. To repair their image without admitting a mistake, they use their network holiday time to provide a memorable Christmas for a poor family. Meanwhile, Alan fears that Wiccans have cursed his golf game.
17	"Girls Night Out"	Michael Kennedy	Ed Macdonald	January 10, 2000	2-11
Tired of being taken for granted, Veronica gives the staff the afternoon off and has a girls' lunch with Lisa and Wanda – which extends beyond last call. Alan, Richard and Victor tear the office apart in their search for a foreign tax file which Veronica had actually paid the week before.
18	"Creative Deadline"	Jerry Ciccoritti	Mark Farrell	January 17, 2000	2-12
A journalist (Ann Medina) wants to interview Alan for newsmagazine Deadline and the executives prepare defences for the many scandals she might seek to expose. While everyone else is preoccupied, an office temp (Sheila McCarthy) steals Alan's terrible series idea and sells it to NBC.
19	"NATPE"	Henry Sarwer-Foner	Rick Mercer	January 24, 2000	2-13
Alan orders his executives to undergo magnet therapy. Pyramid puts together a school news program to submit for a huge US contract at the National Association of Television Program Executives (NATPE) convention. Learning that Alan's rival Moses Znaimer also wants the contract, Richard uses magnets to sabotage Znaimer's videotapes. Znaimer hires Richard to oversee Citytv Bogota in order to get him out of the way.

== Season 3 ==
No.	Title	Directed by	Written by	Original release date	Prod. code
20	"Richard Returns"	Henry Sarwer-Foner	Rick Mercer	October 16, 2000	3-01
Richard's helicopter is shot down in the Colombian jungle. The shareholders are furious that Alan gave himself a performance bonus during financial troubles as Pyramid's TV productions suffer, and the company faces downsizing. Wanda is obsessed with Manolo, a child refugee who is in the news. Richard returns and, after being fired by Moses Znaimer, brings Manolo to Pyramid with an exclusive contract from his parents, who he met while returning to Canada in a shipping container.
21	"Damacles...What a Doll"	Henry Sarwer-Foner	Rick Mercer	October 23, 2000	3-02
Richard soothes Michael Ruston over changes to Sword of Damacles to appeal to a gay male demographic. Rushton is happy to get a Damacles action figure licensed, but it isn't what anyone expected. Meanwhile, Alan tasks Victor with flying to the Cayman Islands to secretly deposit embezzled money. At the last moment Alan takes the flight himself to earn points for a prestige program, not realizing that Victor had packed something extra.
22	"Beaver Creek: The Movie"	Michael Kennedy	Ed Riche	November 6, 2000	2-03
Shooting has begun on an Adele of Beaver Creek reunion movie, though star Mandy Forward (Megan Follows) is bitter and hasn't signed a contract. Alan deduces that the common link between the hit television shows Baywatch, Flipper, The Beachcombers and Gilligan's Island is water, and writes a script where water is the star. Richard gives the script to Mandy, hoping that she will leak it to hurt Alan and kill the terrible project. Instead, she thinks it is a satire and agrees to do the Beaver Creek movies if she can star in Water to change her image.
23	"Ohm Dot Com"	Henry Sarwer-Foner	Ed Riche	November 13, 2000	3-04
An Internet startup approaches Pyramid to strike a content deal. Alan doesn't understand what all this Internet fuss is about, while Veronica and Richard dabble in insider trading. Victor starts going to raves to prove that he isn't set in his ways.
24	"Wrongly Convicted"	Stephen Reynolds	Mark Farrell	November 20, 2000	3-05
Dean Sutherland (Mark McKinney), a Stratford Festival actor who'd been wrongfully convicted after a witness recognized him from a dandruff commercial, tries to sell his story to Pyramid, but Alan doesn't trust the DNA evidence and accuses Sutherland of stealing his new Palm Pilot. Veronica and Wanda each become interested in him but he disappoints them both.
25	"Alan's Diet"	Stephen Reynolds	Alex Ganetakos	January 8, 2001	3-06
Alan goes on a protein diet to prepare for an appearance on a television business news show, and bans coffee and vegetables from the office.
26	"Teamwork"	Stephen Reynolds	Mark Farrell	January 15, 2001	3-07
Due to a nightmare, Alan orders Veronica to plan a team building exercise, but immediately excuses himself from participating, and Richard and Victor follow suit. Veronica convinces Alan to hire a chief administrative officer so he can focus on the creative side of his job, but the new executive (Sonja Smits) hires 14 new vice-presidents with contracts Pyramid can't afford to break. While Veronica refuses to do anything about it, Richard, Victor and Alan have to work together to get rid of this new layer of executives.
27	"Happiest Girl in the World"	T. W. Peacocke	Ed MacDonald	January 22, 2001	3-08
Siobhan falls in love with Victor's driver Kyle (Gabriel Hogan), and rushes into marrying him so that he can get a producer's position on Beaver Creek. Richard and Veronica have to create a new children's show for merchandising, and they delegate all the creative work to Wanda.
28	"Beaver Creek: Live"	Michael Kennedy	Alex Galatis	January 29, 2001	3-09
The network rejects the clip show delivered for Beaver Creek's 150th episode, and Alan impulsively suggests a live broadcast. A horrible script, lack of budget, technical faults, poor improvisations, explosive egos, and a television violence protester (Jayne Eastwood) cause things to go awry.
29	"Arcadia 3000"	T. W. Peacocke	Alex Galatis	February 5, 2001	3-10
Fritz Hoffman returns to film parts of Victor's science fiction project, Arcadia 3000, to help secure international sales. Alan works on a director's commentary for the DVD release of Prom Night at Horny High but all he can remember are inappropriate stories that could raise legal issues.
30	"Husband & Wife"	Henry Sarwer-Foner	Mark Farrell	February 12, 2001	3-11
Alan hires husband-and-wife team Susan and William Doyle (Cynthia Dale and C. David Johnson) to secretly produce a morale-boosting video for Pyramid. He tasks Victor and Wanda with securing the movie rights to an unspecified song he heard on the radio, and tasks Richard with making Sword of Damacles more Australian. Threatened, Richard and Veronica attack the couple's insecurities. In the end, Alan is only concerned with his own morale as he promotes and demotes Wanda to office manager, a position she has already held for two months.
31	"Alan's Ex"	T. W. Peacocke	Bob Martin	February 19, 2001	3-12
The team try to appease Siobhan with a two-part episode focusing on her character having a near death experience. Siobhan regresses after witnessing her divorced parents making out. To spite his ex, Alan hires art film director Adam Kalilieh (Don McKellar) to direct any film he wants, but then has to find a way to unload the terrible and costly project. During filming, Veronica encourages Siobhan to kill her character, giving her freedom while removing the company's most troublesome actor.
32	"Goodbye"	Stephen Reynolds	Richard Mercer	February 26, 2001	3-13
Alan decides to kill off the entire cast of Beaver Creek in its season finale; along with threatening emails, this leads the executives to imagine their own eventual deaths. Richard is tasked with secretly producing an attack ad for a mayoral election.

== Season 4 ==
No.	Title	Directed by	Written by	Original release date	Prod. code
33	"The Pitch"	Henry Sarwer-Foner	Rick Mercer	October 12, 2001	4-01
When Alan hires a consultant to write two new TV series, Richard feeds ideas he knows Alan will buy as a secret silent partner. Victor is tasked with suing a conveniently located women's gym to allow male customers.
34	"Trojan Horse"	Henry Sarwer-Foner	Alex Ganetakos	October 19, 2001	4-02
Alan becomes paranoid when he learns that Network Brian's cute daughter Eliza (Patricia Zentilli) has been hired as an intern. Richard and Victor are exiled from the office, and brainstorm a concept for a highly marketable film. Veronica tries to mentor Eliza, but receives a love confession over drinks.
35	"Roomies"	John Greyson	Alex Galatis	October 26, 2001	4-03
Richard tries to save cable reality show Roomies by secretly directing top personality Criz (Gavin Crawford) and putting Victor and Veronica's criticisms on air. When this produces a ratings bump and good press, Alan involves himself with further radical changes.
36	"Office Rumours"	Stephen Reynolds	Mark Farrell	November 2, 2001	4-04
Rumours swirl around the office. Alan tries to get Veronica to quit when he believes that she's pregnant, planting more rumours because she's too smart to be forced out. Amid a staff exodus, naive publicist Belinda (Nikki Payne) quits when she believes the careless and intentional rumours.
37	"Corporate Retreat"	Stephen Reynolds	Ed MacDonald	November 9, 2001	4-05
Alan abruptly takes the executives to the countryside for a motivational retreat run entirely by a persistent man (Seán Cullen) who insists on not using names.
38	"Everyone's a Critic"	Stephen Reynolds	Mark Farrell	November 16, 2001	4-06
Critic J. W. Anderson (Maria Vacratsis) attacks Alan in a review; Wanda keeps reminding Alan for revenge against the executives who are dismissive of her cat problems. Richard tempts Wanda to go further until she swears-off revenge, but the critic situation worsens as another revenge story surfaces.
39	"Beaver Creek Commercials"	Michael Kennedy	Rick Mercer	November 23, 2001	4-07
Alan learns that a Beaver Creek actor did a Japanese commercial in breach of contract, and forces the cast to do an entire series of commercials. Cybil Thornbush (Shirley Douglas) arrives to guest star but insists on filming a 'public service announcement' for the National Rifle Association, at gunpoint.
40	"Creative Bookkeeping"	Michael Kennedy	Ed Riche	November 30, 2001	4-08
Richard coaches Nick Finley (Patrick McKenna) through an interview to become Pyramid's CFO. When Nick is influenced by Veronica and starts scrutinizing expense reports, Richard realizes that he has to go.
41	"Tax Audit"	John Greyson	Alex Galatis	December 7, 2001	4-09
Wanda is audited due to an error, but the executives believe she's secretly rich and ingratiate themselves to her. A network pitch for Chromazoids fails, and Alan tries new management techniques to stimulate creativity. Each of the three propose a new show, Sherlock Horse, based on Alan's own idea.
42	"Alan's Brother"	Stephen Reynolds	Bob Martin	January 11, 2002	4-10
Alan's brother Frank (Colin Mochrie) arrives after spending decades in a mental care facility. Realizing that Alan controlled Pyramid through his power of attorney over Frank, the executives try to please Frank but realize he may be an even worse boss than Alan. They trigger Frank's insecurities so that he voluntarily returns to supervised care.
43	"Book of Damacles"	Henry Sarwer-Foner	Bob Martin	January 25, 2002	4-11
Richard and Veronica have three days to write Damacles: Living the Warrior's Life, cobbling together clichéd sayings from the character's perspective. Victor is inspired by the manuscript and becomes a power negotiator, but Alan sabotages a huge project to get his yes man back. Michael Rushton believes that he literally channeled God to write the book, and attacks a book show host (Bill Carr) for sacrilege.
44	"Veronica's Friend"	Michael Kennedy	Alex Ganetakos	February 1, 2002	4-12
Richard and Victor learn that Veronica's friend Crystal (Arsinée Khanjian) is actually a black widow and has her sights on Alan. Richard matchmakes Crystal with a plumbing magnate in exchange for a little-used web domain, which he then sells to Pyramid.
45	"Just Another Week"	Stephen Reynolds	Mark Farrell	March 1, 2002	4-13
Alan feels snubbed that he wasn't asked to speak at the Toronto Film Institute, and the executives try to get him a masters class so that he won't sever ties with the organization. Victor gets him a roast dinner, and is left with the enormous task of putting it together.
46	"The War of 1812"	Stephen Reynolds	Edward Riche	March 8, 2002	4-14
An American network executive (Linda Kash) who contracted Prodigy to produce a television film about the War of 1812 wants changes to make the film more appealing to American audiences, including changing the British Redcoats to teal and rewriting the ending so that the Americans win.
47	"Damacles, Time Traveler"	Henry Sarwer-Foner	Rick Mercer	March 15, 2002	4-15
Richard has to direct the climactic Sword of Damacles season finale, but loses their location permit when he moves a national historic marker. With no budget, they have Damacles arrive in the Pyramid offices in a puff of smoke and finish shooting there, using the opportunity to work in product placement. The trendy cinéma vérité direction earns Richard a Gemini Award.
48	"Wrap Party"	Michael Kennedy	Ed Riche	March 22, 2002	4-16
Alan organizes the Beaver Creek wrap party in Pyramid's offices to save money, but office equipment is stolen and confidential files examined. Brian prepares blame for a ratings disaster as the Network reschedules the show to create a theme night. Richard tips the police to raid the party, and sneaks Brian out for a guarantee of safety.

== Season 5 ==
No.	Title	Directed by	Written by	Original release date	Prod. code
49	"Private Sector"	Stephen Reynolds	Ed Riche	January 10, 2003	5-01
Executive Brian Switzer is forced out of public television and extorts a job a Pyramid, learning more of their secrets while manipulating them in a bid to replace his previous boss. Alan becomes fearful of the conference room's new plasma display television.
50	"Best Seller"	Mark Farrell	Henry Sarwer-Foner	January 10, 2003	5-02
Alan individually questions the executives on the failed attempt to sign Ann-Marie MacDonald to the Pyramid family. They each throw blame at the others, but Alan ruined the deal by trying to gain himself a biography on Life and Times.
51	"Acquisitions"	Stephen Reynolds	Rick Mercer	January 17, 2003	5-03
Alan wants a TV channel and they look for a failing digital channel. They purchase the Subtitle Movie Channel but can't figure out who is watching it, though Veronica points out that satellite subscribers (like Victor and Richard) pay for it in a monthly package.
52	"People of the Fish"	Stephen Reynolds	Ed Riche	January 24, 2003	5-04
Richard and Veronica try to placate Diane Parkman (Linda Kash), who represents the American co-producer for a movie project, and use her ignorance of Canada to convince her not to stay. Alan is irate at the "Turn off TV Week" literacy campaign, and tries to organize a children's camp with all non-educational television.
53	"Babes with Blades"	John Greyson	Alex Ganetakos	January 31, 2003	5-05
Jealous of the publicity going to Men with Brooms, Alan takes over Veronica's women's hockey documentary. Retitling it Babes with Blades, he casts body doubles for additional scenes of sex appeal. Veronica has her name removed from the project, but Alan wins a Women in Film and Television award for bringing women's hockey into the mainstream.
54	"The Skateboard Show"	Michael Kennedy	Rick Mercer	February 7, 2003	5-06
Richard enlists Wanda's son Billy to fix a skateboarding show so young people will actually watch it, and he directs his friends to take falls. Richard uses some of the footage for a teenage abstinence PSA, but it runs awry of helmet policy. Alan puts an ad in Playback to honour a Beaver Creek actor who died on set, not realizing it was the barnyard pig.
55	"Beaver Creek Valentine"	Michael Kennedy	Unknown	February 14, 2003	5-07
The network reschedules a contracted holiday special for Beaver Creek from Christmas to Valentine's Day. Victor struggles to direct the actors through a hurried rewrite, while Alan sells the concept to their distributor. Richard causes a fire on set to raise production values, and compromises Network Brian and guest star Helga Lemper (Jackie Burroughs) to gain their cooperation.
56	"Office Flu"	Michael Kennedy	Mark Farrell	February 21, 2003	5-08
Alan refuses to acknowledge his flu symptoms and infects the staff, while a contracted computer guy systematically disables their computer systems. This undermines Richard's attempts to submit their shows for European awards, and they are all mistakenly entered in the comedy category.
57	"Alan's New Studio"	Henry Sarwer-Foner	Alex Galatis	February 28, 2003	5-09
Victor learns of the impending sale of Howard Studios – a former battery factory adjacent to a rail line – which leads the executives to compete to keep their place in the main offices. Alan is furious that a decorating magazine has featured a rival studio, and Richard brings in Makeover Man's Toddy McPherson (Chris Hyndmann) to redecorate Pyramid's offices on a budget.
58	"Victor's Dating Show"	Stephen Reynolds	Ed MacDonald	March 7, 2003	5-10
Richard and Veronica skip a trade show while billing personal expenses, and Wanda starts a rumour that they're dating. Alan makes them appear on Pyramid's newly acquired reality show, First Date. They sabotage Victor's direction, and soon the profitable show is falling apart. Alan brings creator Connie (Janet van de Graaf) back with a raise and opportunity to demean Victor.
59	"Bio-Pic"	Stephen Reynolds	Ed Riche	March 14, 2003	5-11
The executives obsess over photos for their annual report. Alan wants to produce a biopic (Vince: the Canadian Kennedy) and feels no need to pay for a con artist's untrue story, but his sudden attention leads to a bidding war. Victor is appointed to the Leaf of Fame awards committee and pushes to honour Michael Rushton, leading a journalist to uncover the actor's sordid past.
60	"Dock Cops"	Stephen Reynolds	Alex Ganetakos	March 21, 2003	5-12
Critically acclaimed procedural Dock Cops is retooled due to meagre ratings, replacing the male lead with two blonde women named Lizzy (Kathryn Greenwood) and Lezzy, immediately gaining international sales. The police raid a very exclusive brothel where Alan used Victor's name; when the client list is published, Victor's reputation soars by association.
61	"Beaver Creek Jumps the Shark"	Michael Kennedy	Bob Martin	May 30, 2003	5-13
While Alan is out for the office to prepare his surprise early birthday party, the executives consider when Beaver Creek jumped the shark and reminisce about how their own lives have done the same.
62	"Richard's Brother"	Henry Sarwer-Foner	Bob Martin	May 30, 2003	5-14
Alan is concerned that Richard's obnoxious kids game show will make him look stupid. Richard's brother Charles (Scott Thompson), an abusive disciplinarian vice-principal, hosts the retooled version. Charles runs afoul of Alan by criticizing his speech to an all-women's Catholic college – for an honorary Doctorate of Letters arranged by Veronica – so Richard and Victor provoke him into an on-camera fireable offence.
63	"Requiem for Beaver Creek"	John Greyson	Ed MacDonald	June 6, 2003	5-15
The network cancels Beaver Creek, and the company scrambles to save its cash cow. Unable to find an official fan club, they start their own astroturf protest and sign the cast to new shows. In the end, the network agrees to a series of reunion specials which are likely to draw higher ratings than additional episodes would have done.
64	"Producer's Cut"	Henry Sarwer-Foner	Mark Farrell	June 13, 2003	5-16
Alan believes that television satire Producer's Cut is making fun of him. Undercover agent Wanda's talents are recognized with an executive position, and she negotiates Alan's cameo on the show. Alan's suggestion to improvise briefly fools writer/director Jonathan Summers (Jeremy Hotz) that his ineptitude is an act. It turns out that Pyramid is producing the show through a series of acquisitions. Meanwhile, Veronica negotiates new contracts for the executives, including herself.
65	"The Last Show"	Rick Mercer	Rick Mercer	June 20, 2003	5-17
Alan sells Pyramid to a dairy farmer (Gordon Pinsent), who fires everybody except Wanda and Victor. Richard and Veronica start their own firm and get rich off a terrible show. Victor later marries and retires, and Wanda becomes CEO of Pyramid.
