= 4th Canadian Comedy Awards =

Festival and awards ceremony for works of 2002

- Date: 2003
- Location: Grand Theatre; London, Ontario
- Country: Canada
- Presented by: Canadian Comedy Foundation for Excellence
- Hosted by: Royal Canadian Air Farce

Highlights
- Most wins: Television: Made in Canada, This Hour Has 22 Minutes (2); Film: Goldmember (2); Person: Mike Myers (2)
- Most nominations: Television: Made in Canada (7); Film: Rub & Tug (6)
- Website: www.canadiancomedyawards.org

The 4th Canadian Comedy Awards, presented by the Canadian Comedy Foundation for Excellence (CCFE), honoured the best live, television, and film comedy of 2002. The ceremony was held in 2003 in London, Ontario, concluding the three-day Canadian Comedy Awards Festival. The ceremony was hosted by the Royal Canadian Air Farce.

Canadian Comedy Awards, also known as Beavers, were awarded in 19 categories. Winners were picked by members of ACTRA (Alliance of Canadian Cinema, Television and Radio Artists), the Canadian Actors' Equity Association, the Writers Guild of Canada, the Directors Guild of Canada, and the Comedy Association.

For the second consecutive year nominations were led by TV series Made in Canada with seven nominations, followed by the films Men with Brooms and Rub & Tug with six apiece. Made in Canada and This Hour Has 22 Minutes each won two Beavers, as did Mike Myers for Goldmember.

== Festival and ceremony ==
The Canadian Comedy Awards had been televised in 2000 and 2001, but due to a lack of sponsorship the broadcasts stopped in 2002 and the awards ceremony was scaled-back. In 2003 the Canadian Comedy Foundation for Excellence (CCFE) was incorporated as a non-profit to organize the awards and the accompanying Canadian Comedy Awards Festival, a three-day comedy festival held in London, Ontario. The festival took advantage of having the nominees in sketch, stand-up and improv comedy together in one place, and showcase performances led up to the awards ceremony.

The 4th awards ceremony was hosted by the Royal Canadian Air Farce, who had been inducted into the Canadian Comedy Hall of Fame two years earlier.

== Winners and nominees ==
Winners are listed first and highlighted in boldface:

=== Live ===
Best Male Stand-up	Best Female Stand-up	Best Stand-up Newcomer
**Winston Spear**; Derek Edwards; Jason Rouse; Mike Wilmot; Russell Peters	**Nikki Payne**; Kate Davis; Martha Chaves; Shannon Laverty; Tracey MacDonald	**Gilson Lubin**; Andrea Jensen; Casey Corbin; Dave Hemstead; Sam Easton
Best Male Improviser		Best Female Improviser
**Doug Morency**; Derek Flores; Doug Funk; Mark Hickox; Paul Bates		**Lisa Merchant**; Aurora Browne; Jane Luk; Lisa Brooke; Rebecca Northan
Best Sketch Troupe or Company		Best Improv Troupe or Company
**The Minnesota Wrecking Crew**; Camaro; Martin and Johnson; Second City Mainstage; The Young and the Useless		**Slap Happy**; Cast of Die-Nasty; Lamb Chops; The Jack Miller Show
Best One Person Show		Best Comedic Play, Revue or Series
**Heino Happy Hour**; Dave Broadfoot: The First Farewell Tour; Don't Panic Remain.com; Not Getting It; Nymphomaniac		**The Second City: Psychedelicatessen**; Flux; Radcliffe and Minotauk Falls; Gazebo Pals: Romance-o-Rama; U-Haulywood

=== Television ===
Best Performance by a Male	Best Performance by a Female
**Gavin Crawford** – **The Gavin Crawford Show**; Dan Lett – Made in Canada; Peter Keleghan – Made in Canada; Dan Redican – Puppets Who Kill; Don Ferguson – Royal Canadian Air Farce	**Cathy Jones** – **This Hour Has 22 Minutes**; Leah Pinsent – Made in Canada; Luba Goy – Royal Canadian Air Farce; Debra McGrath – The Gavin Crawford Show; Marypat Farrell – The Gavin Crawford Show
Best Direction in a Series	Best Direction in a Special or Episode
**Michael Kennedy, Stephen Reynolds** and **Henry Sarwer-Foner – Made in Canada**; Shawn Alex Thompson – Puppets Who Kill; Perry Rosemond – Royal Canadian Air Farce; Ron Murphy – The Gavin Crawford Show; Henry Sarwer-Foner – This Hour Has 22 Minutes	**Shawn Alex Thompson – Puppets Who Kill – "Cuddles Goes to Jail"**; Henry Sarwer-Foner – Made in Canada – "Damacles Time Traveller"; Michael Kennedy – Made in Canada – "Creative Bookkeeping"; Perry Rosemond – Royal Canadian Air Farce – New Year's Eve Special; Henry Sarwer-Foner – This Hour Has 22 Minutes – New Year's Eve Special
Best Writing in a Series	Best Writing in a Special or Episode
**Rick Mercer** and **Mark Farrell** – **Made in Canada**; John Pattison – Puppets Who Kill; Roger Abbott, Don Ferguson, Luba Goy, Gord Holtam, Rick Olsen – Royal Canadian Air Farce; Kyle Tingley, Jennifer Whalen, Gavin Crawford, Alex Pugsley – The Gavin Crawford Show; Greg Thomey, Colin Mochrie, Mary Walsh, Cathy Jones, Luciano Casimiri, Mark Critch, Mark Farrell, Paul Mather, Peter McBain, Kevin White – This Hour Has 22 Minutes	**Greg Thomey, Colin Mochrie, Mary Walsh, Cathy Jones, Mark Critch, Mark Farrell, Paul Mather, Peter McBain** and **Kevin White** – **This Hour Has 22 Minutes** – **New Year's Eve Special**; Greg Lawrence – Kevin Spencer – "Kevin the Musical"; Ariana Smith, Michael McKinnon, Brigitte Gall – Laughing Matters; John Pattison – Puppets Who Kill – "Cuddles Goes To Jail"; Gord Holtam, Rick Olsen – Royal Canadian Air Farce – New Year's Eve Special

=== Film ===
Best Performance by a Male	Best Performance by a Female
**Mike Myers – Goldmember**; Jed Rees – Men with Brooms; Liam Neeson – Men with Brooms; Paul Gross – Men with Brooms; Don McKellar – Rub & Tug	**Nia Vardalos – My Big Fat Greek Wedding**; Polly Shannon – Men with Brooms; Kira Clavell – Rub & Tug; Lindy Booth – Rub & Tug; Tara Spencer-Nairn – Rub & Tug
Best Direction	Best Writing
**Paul Gross – Men with Brooms**; Christy Garland – Dual Citizen; Soo Lyu – Rub & Tug	**Mike Myers – Goldmember**; Christy Garland – Dual Citizen; Paul Gross, John Krizanc – Men with Brooms; Nia Vardalos – My Big Fat Greek Wedding; Soo Lyu, Edward Stanulis – Rub & Tug

== Multiple wins ==
The following people, shows, films, etc. received multiple awards

Awards	Person or work
2	Made in Canada
2	Mike Myers / Goldmember
2	This Hour Has 22 Minutes

== Multiple nominations ==
The following people, shows, films, etc. received multiple nominations

Nominations	Person or work
7	Made in Canada
6	Royal Canadian Air Farce
6	Rub & Tug
5	The Gavin Crawford Show
5	Men with Brooms
5	Puppets Who Kill
4	This Hour Has 22 Minutes
2	Dual Citizen
2	Mike Myers / Goldmember
2	My Big Fat Greek Wedding
