= List of programs broadcast by A-Channel =

This is a list of programs aired by the original Craig Wireless incarnation of A-Channel in Canada. For programs aired by the later CHUM Limited/CTVglobemedia incarnation, see List of programs broadcast by CTV and CTV 2.

== Programming ==
Show	Type	Years broadcast	Notes	Ref(s)
3rd Rock from the Sun	Sitcom			
7th Heaven	Drama			
The Adventures of Sam & Max: Freelance Police	Children's			
America's Most Wanted	Reality			
Arthur	Children's			
Assy McGee	Sitcom			
Babar	Children's			
Back to the Future	Children's			
Big Bad Beetleborgs	Children's			
The Big Breakfast	Talk			
Birdz	Children's			
Blazing Dragons	Children's			
Buffy, the Vampire Slayer	Drama			
A Bunch of Munsch	Children's			
Cat Tales	Children's			
COPS	Reality			
The Country Mouse and the City Mouse Adventures	Children's			
Cow and Chicken	Children's			
Earthworm Jim	Children's			
Finding Mary March	Drama			
The Flintstones	Children's			
Flying Rhino Junior High	Children's			
Freakazoid!	Children's			
Friends	Sitcom			
hooked up				
The Jetsons	Children's			
Johnny Bravo	Children's			
Legends of Hockey	Reality			
Little Bear	Children's			
The Magic School Bus	Children's			
Mr Men	Children's			
MTV Select	Music			
Night Hood	Children's			
Nilus the Sandman	Children's			
Pepsi Breakout				
The Raccoons	Children's			
Seinfeld	Sitcom			
The Sharing Circle				
The Simpsons	Sitcom			
Star Trek: Deep Space Nine	Drama			
Super Mario World	Children's			
Taz-Mania	Children's			
Tiny Toon Adventures	Children's			
To Serve and Protect	Reality			
Tom and Jerry	Children's			
Wanted Man				
