= Made in Canada (TV series) =

Television series

- Also known as: The Industry
- Genre: Dark comedy; Satire; Sitcom
- Created by: Michael Donovan, Gerald Lunz and Rick Mercer
- Based on: Richard III by Shakespeare
- Written by: Mark Farrell and Rick Mercer (season one)
- Starring: Rick Mercer; Peter Keleghan; Dan Lett; Leah Pinsent; Jackie Torrens
- Ending theme: "Blow at High Dough"
- Country of origin: Canada
- No. of seasons: 5
- No. of episodes: 65 (list of episodes)

Production
- Executive producer: Gerald Lunz
- Production location: Halifax, Nova Scotia
- Running time: 30 minutes
- Production companies: Salter Street Films; Island Edge

Original release
- Network: CBC Television
- Release: 5 October 1998 – 20 June 2003

Made in Canada is a Canadian television comedy that aired on CBC Television from 1998 to 2003. Rick Mercer starred as Richard Strong, an ambitious and amoral television producer working for a company which makes bad (but profitable) television shows. A dark satire about the Canadian television industry, the program shifted into an episodic sitcom format after its first season.

It was created by Mercer, Gerald Lunz and Michael Donovan, produced by Salter Street Films and Island Edge, and filmed in Halifax, Nova Scotia. The series was broadcast with Salter Street's satirical newsmagazine, This Hour Has 22 Minutes, and drew its creators, writing staff, and much of its production staff from that program; Made in Canada was filmed during the summer, and 22 Minutes during the fall. Mercer starred on both until he left 22 Minutes in 2001.

The series received critical and popular recognition. It was particularly well-received by the industry it lampooned, attracting many guest stars. It received 23 national awards during its five-season run, including multiple Gemini, Writers Guild of Canada, and Canadian Comedy Awards. In the United States, Australia and Latin America, the show was syndicated as The Industry. In France, it was syndicated as La loi du Show-Biz.

== Plot ==
A satire of film and television production, the series revolves around fictional Pyramid Productions – a company where greed and backstabbing thrive. Pyramid produces lucrative (but terrible) television and films for the domestic and international markets, with creative decisions made by non-creative people.

Company head Alan Roy is obsessed with appearances and staying ahead of trends, whether this means owning his own cable channel or having the largest yacht at Cannes. His often-idiotic decisions lead to extra work for his employees, who must fulfill his wishes or deal with the consequences. The employees – Richard, Victor, Veronica and Wanda – manipulate each other and sabotage each other's projects to earn more money, gain promotions or work on better projects. None of them appear to have issues with breaking the law, and they seem to have no sense of morality. They generally only cooperate when they have an opportunity to destroy another company or a mutual enemy. Each episode deals with one major problem (or event), which normally does not carry over to the next episode.

Pyramid projects also provide storylines for the series, as the company's staff try to manage the inevitable complications created by the casts and crews of their film and television productions. Its cash cows are two series: The Sword of Damacles [sic], a parody of mythological adventure series such as Xena: Warrior Princess and Hercules: The Legendary Journeys, and Beaver Creek, a parody of Canadian period dramas such as Anne of Green Gables and Road to Avonlea. The staff also face complications with their low-budget, poorly-made films, such as Vigilante's Vengeance. Many of their movies fail; they are not produced, or go direct-to-video in foreign countries.

== Characters ==
- Richard Strong (Rick Mercer), the central character, is an ambitious, machiavellian employee trying to navigate, scheme and backstab his way to the CEO's chair; in the first episode, he makes his way from junior script reader to television producer by having his boss (and brother-in-law) Ray Drodge fired. Ruthless and amoral, he is better at his job than most of his colleagues. Richard has had relationships with Veronica Miller, Lisa Sutton and Siobhan Roy, but generally as an opportunity to manipulate rather than out of love. The character was partially inspired by Ian McKellen's performance in the 1995 film adaptation of Shakespeare's Richard III. He personifies human vice, unfettered by ethics.
- Alan Roy (Peter Keleghan), the firm's CEO, is a charismatic but intellectually-questionable womanizer who often succeeds more by accident than skill and, much more often, fails miserably. He is frequently mystified that his management style – a combination of bad production ideas, offbeat health fads and half-understood slogans from management books – does not rouse office morale. Alan's career was launched with his first film, Prom Night at Horny High, which was a commercial success despite being lowbrow and indecent. (Keleghan had an early starring role in the 1983 sex comedy Screwballs.) Keleghan described the character as a cross between Alliance Communications head Robert Lantos and The Simpsons' Mr. Burns. Producer Michael Donovan joked that Alan reflected the showrunners' impression of him.
- Veronica Miller (Leah Pinsent) is the firm's chief operating officer. Although she is generally overworked, doing the jobs of several other employees, she is still forced to do idiotic and degrading tasks for Alan. Veronica occasionally becomes fed up with her poor treatment and sabotages a project or event, which usually spurs Alan to improve her working conditions and meet her demands. The office problem-solver, she is generally an ally of Richard's in making the best of Alan's decisions but will double-cross him if necessary.
- Victor Sela (Dan Lett) is head of Pyramid's film division and a general office sycophant, willing to do almost anything Alan asks of him (no matter how demeaning). He is usually very positive about Alan's schemes. In a test, however, Victor is the least loyal.
- Wanda Mattice (Jackie Torrens), Alan's assistant, uses her influence in the day-to-day workings of the office to obtain power beyond her role in the corporate hierarchy and knows when it is to her advantage to act less intelligent. Although she frequently dresses strangely and appears frumpy, Alan is attracted to her and they frequently have sex in the office.
- Lisa Sutton (Janet Kidder) is a producer and Victor's girlfriend. Richard considers her a threat to his power, and Alan dislikes her for ignoring (or spurning) his attempts to seduce her.
- Raymond Drodge (Ron James) is a producer. Formerly the head of television development, he is fired in the pilot after Richard and Siobhan frame him for sexually harassing Siobhan. He is later rehired in a much lower position after Richard gets his old job. Due to Richard's manipulation, Raymond's marriage falls apart and he begins to believe that he is an alcoholic.
- Michael Rushton (Alex Carter) is the dimwitted, egotistical star of The Sword of Damacles.
- Siobhan Roy (Emily Hampshire), Alan's daughter, is one of the stars of Beaver Creek. Fully aware that being the boss's daughter gives her job security, she freely schemes and manipulates to get whatever she wants.
- Brian Switzer (Chas Lawther), nicknamed "Network Brian", is an executive with the television network which airs Beaver Creek and its main liaison with Pyramid.

=== Notable guest stars ===
Most people employed in Canadian television enjoyed the series, which created a stir in the industry and attracted a number of guest stars:

- Gordon Pinsent as Walter Franklyn, star of Beaver Creek and "Canada's most beloved actor". Pinsent returns in the last episode as a dairy mogul who buys the company. Mercer considered Pinsent's work to be a major influence on his career, and was extremely pleased to have him in the cast; during the series' production, Mercer narrated a biography of Pinsent.
- Peter Blais as Geoff, an actor who comes out and subsequently wants Parson Hubbard (his character on Beaver Creek) to be gay
- Andrew Bush as a young method actor who plays Blind Jimmy on Beaver Creek
- Mary-Colin Chisholm as an actor who plays Nurse Melissa on Beaver Creek
- Maury Chaykin as Captain McGee, a kiddie entertainer who is caught in a sex scandal
- Andy Jones as Fritz Hoffman, a German TV executive who believes that Beaver Creek is a sexier version of Dawson's Creek
- Sarah Polley as the head of the Church of Spirentology [sic] cult
- Shirley Douglas and Margot Kidder appeared as fading Hollywood actresses making guest appearances on Beaver Creek.
- Megan Follows (the real-life star of Anne of Green Gables) as Mandy Forward, the former "Adele of Beaver Creek", who returned for a reunion movie and discovered that after her previous Beaver Creek movie, Alan kept the sets up to produce a pornographic knockoff.
- Mark McKinney as Dean Sutherland, a released convict who wants to sell his story
- Don McKellar as Adam Kalilieh, an independent art film director
- Joe Flaherty as a mayoral candidate who hires Pyramid to smear his opponent
- Cynthia Dale and C. David Johnson as a husband-and-wife motivational team
- Colin Mochrie as Frank Roy: Alan's mentally-handicapped brother who, as part of an elaborate tax dodge orchestrated by Alan, is revealed as the actual Pyramid CEO.

Several Canadian media personalities made cameos as fictionalized versions of themselves, including Nicholas Campbell, Ann-Marie MacDonald, Moses Znaimer, Kiefer Sutherland, Evan Solomon, Peter Gzowski, Ann Medina and Gino Empry.

== Development and writing ==
The series was conceived by Mercer, executive producer Gerald Lunz and Salter Street Films co-chair Michael Donovan in 1994. Lunz had launched Mercer's career, producing his one-man shows and This Hour Has 22 Minutes (the latter of which was made by Salter Street). Mercer and Lunz formed Island Edge to co-produce Made in Canada and develop other projects for Mercer.

Donovon, Lunz and Mercer wanted to satirize office politics, starring Mercer as an ambitious man manipulating his way to the top in a parody of Shakespeare's Richard III. Instead of killing his rivals, the series' Richard would kill their careers by ruining their reputations and seizing their power. Richard would address the audience directly, breaking the fourth wall to share his plans and ambitions. Although they realized this was a risk, they felt that Mercer could connect with the audience as he had in his monologues. Mercer had established himself as the first mainstream Canadian satirist to make scathing criticisms directly, without a comedic mask.

They had considered setting the satire in the federal bureaucracy in line with Mercer's political criticism (known as the country's "unofficial opposition party"), but Mercer was not sufficiently knowledgeable about the government's inner workings. Believing that satire required a firm understanding of its targets, they set the series in a television and film production office; this would be understood by the audience and provide many egos to lampoon. Mercer described the series in a later interview as having a "Dilbert reality" of an office, in which some have a "suck-up kick-down philosophy". In April 1998, the Canadian Broadcasting Corporation (CBC) approved a six-part series without seeing a script.

The first season was cowritten by Mercer and Mark Farrell over a two-month period. They had both written for 22 Minutes and had written sketches for several years, but neither had written episodic television before. Lunz, a self-described "Shakespeare nut", guided the theme and style. Farrell, Lunz and Mercer remained the show's creative force throughout its five seasons. Other writers for the series included Paul Bellini, Alex Ganetakos and Edward Riche.

The series shifted from a dark satire to an episodic sitcom after its first season, and addressed the audience less frequently. This was often limited to the closing line – "I think that went well" or "This is not good" – which might be given to a character other than Richard, depending on who was behind that episode's schemes. The series' working title was The Industry, which was changed to The Casting Couch and then Made in Canada.

== Production ==
CBC executive George Anthony, who had convinced Lunz and Mercer to come to the network years previously, recognized their talent and was firmly supportive of the production. The series went from network approval to broadcast in a record six months. Executives ordered a thirteen-episode second season after viewing the first episode, which was unprecedented for the public broadcaster. Casting was done while scripts were still being written, and episodes were filmed out of sequence to accommodate the actors' schedules.

Filmed in Halifax, Nova Scotia, the series was produced by (and a parody of) Salter Street Films. It used Salter Street's real offices as its main office set during the first season, shooting primarily on evenings and weekends from 17 July to 24 August 1998. The first season was directed by Henry Sarwer-Foner (also of 22 Minutes), who had his hand in the series' editing, scripting, and overall design. He shot with a long lens to achieve a film-like quality, and sought to give it a distinctive look. Sarwer-Foner directed 22 of the series' 65 episodes. Other directors included Michael Kennedy and Stephen Reynolds.

The series used The Tragically Hip's "Blow at High Dough", one of Mercer's favourite songs, as its theme. The iconic Canadian band's first hit single, its title was taken from a Scottish phrase about being overambitious and taking on more than one could handle. The lyrics refer to a movie production (Speedway, starring Elvis Presley) which sweeps up a small town. Other Tragically Hip songs were featured including "Poets", "Courage", "New Orleans Is Sinking", "My Music at Work", and "Tiger the Lion".

Although Mercer took time off from 22 Minutes in January 1999 to concentrate on the second season of Made in Canada, he continued to appear in most episodes until he retired from 22 Minutes in 2001. The series continued to film during the summer, with 22 Minutes filming in the fall. The second season began filming in June 1999 at Electropolis Studios in Halifax. CHUM Limited vice-president Moses Znaimer allowed scenes for the second-season finale to be filmed at the CHUM-City Building in Toronto for authenticity. Season four began filming on 18 June 2001.

While the first season of the series was in production, two Canadian film and television studios (Alliance Communications and Atlantis Communications) merged to create Alliance Atlantis. This merger was parodied in Made in Canada's second-season premiere, when Pyramid merges with a company called Prodigy and becomes Pyramid Prodigy. Two years later, Alliance Atlantis purchased Salter Street Films.

== Broadcast and home video ==
Made in Canada premiered on CBC Television on 5 October 1998, amidst Canadian Radio-television and Telecommunications Commission (CRTC) hearings on the country's broadcasting policy and Canadian content. The series aired on Monday nights at 8:30 pm, after This Hour Has 22 Minutes. Both programs were moved to Friday in fall 2001, leading into Royal Canadian Air Farce and The Red Green Show in a CBC move to create a comedy-programming block and boost already-strong ratings.

The first two seasons were sold to PBS in 1999 for distribution in the United States as The Industry. The series was also syndicated in France, Australia and Latin America; the French name was La loi du Show-Biz.

In 2000, DVD and home-video rights to seasons one and two were acquired by Koch International. Entertainment One released the first season on DVD in Region 1 in 2002; it is currently out of print. The series was telecast on the Canadian cable channel BiteTV from 2010 to 2015.

The first and second seasons began streaming on the CBC Gem platform on 12 March 2020. In October 2022, it was announced that additional seasons would become available, with all five seasons streaming on Gem as of 2023.

== Reception ==
The series was popular and critically praised in Canada and the United States. The series' 5 October 1998 premiere had 1,002,000 viewers, holding 75 percent of the audience from the lead-in This Hour Has 22 Minutes.

=== Critical response ===
Shannon Hawkins of the Ottawa Sun wrote during its first season that Made in Canada had "all the makings of a hit", with clever dialogue, plausible characters and a storyline for anyone who fantasized about ruining their boss. Antonia Zerbisias of the Toronto Star described the series as "scary, cynical and biting", and felt that the production took huge risks in satirizing its producers and industry moguls and its choice of title in a country which looked down on domestic productions. According to Stephen Cole of The National Post, the first season was well-scripted, funny and clever with solid performances but never found a target worthy of its "savage and cutting" satire. Cole was disappointed that the series remained a sitcom instead of taking on more compelling issues specific to the Canadian industry. Rating the first episode 9 out of 10, a TV Guide reviewer said that the series centred on Mercer's fresh and deeply-biting "satire with a smirk" complemented with an able cast; although the audience might miss some inside jokes, it was felt that the show should hold the 22 Minutes audience. For Saturday Night, comedy critic Andrew Clark wrote that the series created an eerily-believable universe with its casting, filming location and fictitious shows, and appreciated Mercer's ability to find a satirical line and hone it to a cutting edge.

At the beginning of its fourth season, John Doyle of The Globe and Mail called the show "addictive", switching from absurdity to brutal satire accessible to every viewer. At the end of the series, Doyle wrote that most in the industry had enjoyed its "twisted, vague versions" of real stories and scandals.

Made in Canada has been compared to Ken Finkleman's satire, The Newsroom, in which Farrell, Keleghan, and Pinsent had roles. Although they share a documentary feel and were shot in real offices, Clark noted that their lead characters are distinctly different; Richard's ambition is all-consuming, and he wages "intergenerational warfare" against the likes of Finkleman's ineffective George Findlay.

=== Awards ===
The series was nominated for more than three dozen Gemini Awards during its five-season run, winning ten. Made in Canada was nominated for fourteen awards at the 2002 Geminis, the first time a sitcom led dramatic series and miniseries in nominations. Its wins included two for Best Comedy Series and three for Best Ensemble Performance in a Comedy.

The show won nine Canadian Comedy Awards out of twenty-six nominations, leading the nominations in 2000, 2002 and 2003. It received four Writers Guild of Canada Awards and a Directors Guild of Canada Award. After the series ended, Mercer won the 2003 Sir Peter Ustinov Comedy Award at the Banff Television Festival, and a 2004 National Arts Centre Award for outstanding work of the previous year.

Year	Ceremony	Category	Nominee or recipient	Result	Ref
1999	14th Gemini Awards	Best Comedy Program or Series	Michael Donovan, Gerald Lunz, Linda Nelson, Marilyn Richardson	Won	
1999	14th Gemini Awards	Best Direction in a Comedy Program or Series	Henry Sarwer-Foner	Won	
2000	1st Canadian Comedy Awards	Best Performance by a Male – Television	Rick Mercer	Won	
2000	1st Canadian Comedy Awards	Best Performance by a Male – Television	Peter Keleghan	Nominated	
2000	1st Canadian Comedy Awards	Best Performance by a Female – Television	Leah Pinsent	Nominated	
2000	1st Canadian Comedy Awards	Best Direction in a Series	Michael Kennedy	Won	
2000	1st Canadian Comedy Awards	Best Direction in a Series	Henry Sarwer-Foner	Nominated	
2000	1st Canadian Comedy Awards	Best Writing in a Series	Rick Mercer	Nominated	
2000	15th Gemini Awards	Best Direction in a Comedy Program or Series	Henry Sarwer-Foner	Won	
2000	15th Gemini Awards	Best Comedy Program or Series	Michael Donovan and Gerald Lunz	Nominated	
2001	2nd Canadian Comedy Awards	Best Performance by a Male – Television	Rick Mercer	Nominated	
2001	2nd Canadian Comedy Awards	Best Performance by a Male – Television	Peter Keleghan	Nominated	
2001	2nd Canadian Comedy Awards	Best Performance by a Female – Television	Leah Pinsent	Nominated	
2001	2nd Canadian Comedy Awards	Best Writing in a Special or Episode	Mark Farrell	Won	
2001	2nd Canadian Comedy Awards	Best Writing in a Series	Mark Farrell, Rick Mercer, Ed Macdonald, Edward Riche, Alex Galatis, Alex Ganetakos, Raymond Storey	Nominated	
2001	16th Gemini Awards	Best Comedy Program or Series	Gerald Lunz and Michael Donovan	Won	
2001	16th Gemini Awards	Best Ensemble Performance in a Comedy Program or Series	Rick Mercer, Jackie Torrens, Dan Lett, Peter Keleghan, Leah Pinsent, Emily Hampshire	Won	
2001	5th Canadian Screenwriters' Awards	Top 10 Screenplays	Rick Mercer	Won	
2001	5th Canadian Screenwriters' Awards	Top 10 Screenplays	Edward Riche	Won	
2002	3rd Canadian Comedy Awards	Best Performance by a Male – Television	Rick Mercer	Won	
2002	3rd Canadian Comedy Awards	Best Performance by a Male – Television	Peter Keleghan	Nominated	
2002	3rd Canadian Comedy Awards	Best Performance by a Female – Television	Leah Pinsent	Nominated	
2002	3rd Canadian Comedy Awards	Best Performance by a Female – Television	Jackie Torrens	Nominated	
2002	3rd Canadian Comedy Awards	Best Direction in a Series	Michael Kennedy, T. W. Peacocke, Stephen Reynolds, Henry Sarwer-Foner and Jerry Ciccoritti	Won	
2002	3rd Canadian Comedy Awards	Best Direction in a Special or Episode	Henry Sarwer-Foner	Won	
2002	3rd Canadian Comedy Awards	Best Writing in a Special or Episode	Bob Martin	Won	
2002	3rd Canadian Comedy Awards	Best Writing in a Series	Rick Mercer, Mark Farrell, Alex Galatis, Alex Ganetakos, Ed Macdonald, Bob Martin, Edward Riche, Raymond Storey	Nominated	
2002	17th Gemini Awards	Best Ensemble Performance in a Comedy Program or Series	Rick Mercer, Jackie Torrens, Dan Lett, Peter Keleghan, Leah Pinsent	Won	
2002	17th Gemini Awards	Best Direction in a Comedy Program or Series	John Greyson	Won	
2002	17th Gemini Awards	Best Writing in a Comedy or Variety Program or Series	Rick Mercer	Won	
2002	17th Gemini Awards	Best Comedy Program or Series	Michael Donovan, Gerald Lunz	Nominated	
2002	17th Gemini Awards	Best Picture Editing in a Comedy	Alan MacLean	Nominated	
2003	4th Canadian Comedy Awards	Best Performance by a Male – Television	Dan Lett	Nominated	
2003	4th Canadian Comedy Awards	Best Performance by a Male – Television	Peter Keleghan	Nominated	
2003	4th Canadian Comedy Awards	Best Performance by a Female – Television	Leah Pinsent	Nominated	
2003	4th Canadian Comedy Awards	Best Direction in a Series	Michael Kennedy, Stephen Reynolds and Henry Sarwer-Foner	Won	
2003	4th Canadian Comedy Awards	Best Direction in a Special or Episode	Henry Sarwer-Foner	Nominated	
2003	4th Canadian Comedy Awards	Best Direction in a Special or Episode	Michael Kennedy	Nominated	
2003	4th Canadian Comedy Awards	Best Writing in a Series	Rick Mercer and Mark Farrell	Won	
2003	2nd Directors Guild of Canada Awards	Outstanding Achievement in a Television Series – Comedy	Michael Kennedy	Won	
2003	2nd Directors Guild of Canada Awards	Outstanding Achievement in a Television Series – Comedy	episode "Best Seller"	Nominated	
2003	18th Gemini Awards	Best Ensemble Performance in a Comedy Program or Series	Dan Lett, Jackie Torrens, Peter Keleghan, Rick Mercer, Leah Pinsent	Nominated	
2003	6th Canadian Screenwriters' Awards	Top 10 Screenplays	Mark Farrell	Won	
2003	6th Canadian Screenwriters' Awards	Top 10 Screenplays	Edward Riche	Won	
2004	19th Gemini Awards	Best Ensemble Performance in a Comedy Program or Series	Dan Lett, Jackie Torrens, Peter Keleghan, Rick Mercer, Leah Pinsent	Won	

=== Reunion ===
A 15th-anniversary Made in Canada reunion, attended by Mercer, Keleghan, Pinsent, Lett, Torrens, Lunz, Sarwer-Foner, Riche and Farrell, was held at the Canadian International Television Festival (CITF) on 16 November 2013. The reunion included a screening, followed by a question-and-answer session.
