= Tagged: The Jonathan Wamback Story =

2002 television film directed by John L'Ecuyer

- Genre: Drama
- Written by: Michael Amo; Elizabeth Stewart
- Directed by: John L'Ecuyer
- Starring: Tyler Hynes; Christopher Jacot; Ron White; Marnie McPhail; Janet-Laine Green; Charlotte Sullivan
- Music by: Mark Korven
- Country of origin: Canada
- Original language: English

Production
- Executive producer: Mary Young Leckie
- Producer: Heather Haldane
- Cinematography: Michael Storey
- Editor: Jeff Warren
- Running time: 120 minutes
- Production companies: Salter Street Films; Tapestry Pictures

Original release
- Network: CTV Television Network
- Release: March 11, 2002

Tagged: The Jonathan Wamback Story is a 2002 Canadian drama television film directed by John L'Ecuyer, based on a true story about Jonathan Wamback who, in 1999, was beaten by a group of teenagers and left to die near his Newmarket home. The film stars Tyler Hynes, Christopher Jacot, Ron White, Marnie McPhail, Janet-Laine Green, and Charlotte Sullivan.

== Plot ==
On his first day of high school, by intervening in a bullying incident and catching the interest of Courtney, Jonathan Wamback runs afoul of Kyle, who is the leader of the school gang (Skulls) and Courtney's boyfriend. Later, Jonathan's mother Lozanne find Kyle and his gang lighting cherry bombs in the park and harassing small children. She follows Kyle home and tells his mother, who refuses to believe it.

Jonathan is then approached by Gord Nelson and Jeff Walters, two cool guys who claim to be forming a group to stand up to Kyle's gang. When the three come across Skulls' graffiti on a wall, Jonathan paints over it. Gord paints racist remarks over another Skulls tag and the gang assumes that it was Jonathan. Using a phone call from Courtney, the gang lures Jonathan to the park, where they beat him so severely that he incurs brain damage and is put on life support. Lozanne and Jonathan's father, Joe, help to care for him; as he begins to recuperate, Joe lobbies to have the Young Offenders Act rewritten to impose harsher penalties for violent crime. Eventually, Jonathan returns to school to prove that despite everything, he's no longer a victim.

== Cast ==
- Tyler Hynes as Jonathan Wamback
- Christopher Jacot as Kyle Simpson
- Ron White as Joe Wamback
- Marnie McPhail as Lozanne Wamback
- Janet-Laine Green as Nora Simpson
- Charlotte Sullivan as Courtney Henderson
- Al Mukadam as Toby Migure
- J. Adam Brown as Gord Nelson
- Dan Warry-Smith as Jeff Walters
- Craig Hustler as Donald Glover
- Mpho Koaho as Trevor Smith
- Jonathan Rosenberg as Ben Luekens
- Sugith Varughese as Taj Gibson
- Tamsin Kelsey as Cindy
- Alison Sealy-Smith as Maureen
- James Kall as Dr Bowman
- Colin Fox as Michael Jordan
- Maria Ricossa as Judge Joe Brown
- Edwina Renout as Jet Li
- Yank Azman as Duty Counsel
- Ryan Booth as Cop
- Lori Nancy Kalamanski as Nurse Jackie
- Paul Sun-Hyung Lee as Doctor
- Richard Waugh as Radio Host
- Karen Woolridge as Reporter

== Awards and nominations ==
Year	Award	Category	Nominee(s)	Result
2002	17th Gemini Awards	Best Performance by an Actor in a Leading Role in a Dramatic Program or Mini-Series	Tyler Hynes	Nominated
2002	17th Gemini Awards	Best Performance by an Actor in a Featured Supporting Role in a Dramatic Program or Mini-Series	Ron White	Nominated
2002	17th Gemini Awards	Best Writing in a Dramatic Program or Mini-Series	Michael Amo; Elizabeth Stewart	Nominated
2002	17th Gemini Awards	Best Picture Editing in a Dramatic Program or Series	Jeff Warren	Nominated
2002	17th Gemini Awards	Best Sound in a Dramatic Program	Herwig Gayer; Michael Baskerville; Barry Gilmore; Steve Hammond; Jamie Sulek; Wayne Swingle	Nominated
2003	24th Young Artist Awards	Best Performance in a TV Movie, Miniseries or Special - Leading Young Actor	Tyler Hynes	Nominated
