= Imperial Room =

Event venue at the Royal York Hotel, Toronto

Coordinates: 43.64593°N 79.38184°W

The 500-seat Imperial Room is a major events venue at the Royal York Hotel in Toronto, Ontario, Canada. The hall is located on the lobby level of the hotel and has hosted major events, such as addresses to the Empire Club of Canada, but was more important historically a top flight nightclub-dinner club.

Legendary performances by popular entertainers included: Marlene Dietrich on her farewell tour, the last performances of Johnny Hodges with the Duke Ellington Orchestra, Count Basie, Woody Herman, Pearl Bailey, Eartha Kitt, Peggy Lee and Ella Fitzgerald, and the first appearances doing comedic impressions in 1982 of future Canadian star, Jim Carrey.

The circuit of grand nightclubs in Canada also included those at railway hotels such as: Chateau Lake Louise, Hotel Saskatchewan, Banff Springs, the Brant Inn in Burlington, Ont., the Savarin Tavern, and the Elmwood Casino in Windsor Ontario. The Imperial Room was always seen as the premiere of these.

It originally became known due to Canadian impresario and orchestra leader, Moxie Whitney. The Moxie Whitney Orchestra played in the Imperial Room continuously from 1948 to 1972, with the exception of 12 months during a Royal York Hotel strike, in 1960/61, when he and his orchestra played the Royal Hawaiian Hotel in Honolulu.

Moxie Whitney also booked all talent for Canadian Pacific Hotels during most of that period.

Welsh bandleader and pianist Allan Singleton-Wood, who had in the late 1960s moved to Canada and joined Whitney’s orchestra, took over in 1971 the contract for the provision of music at the hotel including the Black Knight and Imperial Rooms. In the following years, the Allan Singleton-Wood Orchestra would become one of the best-known dance orchestras in Canada.

Gino Empry took over the booking of acts in the room in 1972. Vegas style shows were brought in by Tibor Rudas, a famous Vegas producer, along with Broadway-style musicals, and attendance declined. Eventually the Imperial Room closed as a showroom, and today it is used for functions and has been restored to its former glory.

The IImperial Room was situated on a north-south axis, visitors were welcomed into the room by show business maitre'd Louis Jannetta, famous for refusing Bob Dylan entrance because he wasn't wearing a tie; and booking agent, Gino Empry, manager of Tony Bennett for 12 years.

Descending a small flight of stairs into a large rectangular sunken area, round tables were waited upon by dozens of waiters and serving staff. Behind brass rails, the diners at their tables viewed the shows. An overly small rectangular stage to the north, with scarce elevation, hosted the grandest of international and Hollywood stars, as well as big bands before a tiny pine-wood dancefloor.
