= Allan Singleton-Wood =

Allan Singleton-Wood (born February 13, 1933) is a Canadian former professional pianist and music director of the BBC Welsh Dance Orchestra, the featured orchestra on the BBC national television series "Swing High." In 1965, he started a second career in publishing, eventually becoming publisher of a number of Canadian national newspapers and magazines, including the Financial Post, Canadian Business, and Small Business.

== Early years ==
Singleton-Wood was born in Newport, Monmouthshire, Wales. He attended St. Julian's High School, where he graduated with a London University Matriculation. He studied law at London University but discontinued an LLB degree to become a professional musician.

== Music career ==
Singleton-Wood, who used the stage name Allan Wood, was a professional pianist, bandleader, and composer when, in 1960, he was named music director of the BBC Welsh Dance Orchestra, broadcasting on the BBC Radio Wales series "Swing For Your Supper" and then on the national BBC TV series "Swing High." This was the last big band series ever to appear on BBC TV. Singleton-Wood also composed songs for the orchestra, including its signature tune, "Swing High."

As Music Director of the BBC Welsh Dance Orchestra, Singleton-Wood gave The Springfields vocal group featuring Dusty Springfield its first radio broadcast in Wales.

In 1963, he was pianist for Shirley Bassey with the Ken Mackintosh Orchestra in a tour of Scotland.

In 1968, Singleton-Wood moved to Canada and joined Moxie Whitney's orchestra at the Imperial Room at the Royal York Hotel, Toronto. On Whitney's retirement in 1971, Singleton-Wood took over the contract for the provision of music at the Hotel including the Black Knight and Imperial Rooms. The Allan Singleton-Wood Orchestra, meanwhile, became one of the best-known dance orchestras in Canada.

== Publishing career ==
In the 1970s, while continuing to lead the Allan Singleton-Wood Orchestra and booking other musical acts at the Royal York Hotel, Singleton-Wood pursued a second career, in publishing. In 1971, he became research director of the Financial Post. In 1973, he was appointed general manager of Maclean-Hunter's Media Research Evaluation Group, overseeing research for the publications Maclean's, Chatelaine, Flare, and the Financial Post. In this capacity he pioneered the development of the first media computer evaluation program in Canada, which gave birth to the national Print Measurement Bureau. In 1978, he became Director of Advertising Sales for the Financial Post. Beginning in 1988, he became publisher of a number of national newspapers and magazines, including the Financial Post, Canadian Business, and Small Business. He was appointed Senior Corporate Publisher for Rogers Business Publishing in 1991, a position he kept until his retirement in 1994.

Singleton-Wood was founder in 1995 of the Canadian Information Productivity Awards (CIPA), which, during its run from 1995 to 2007, became the preeminent information technology awards show in the world. Singleton-Wood came out of retirement in 1995 to take over the position of president and CEO of the award show's parent company, CIPA Ltd., owned by Rogers Communications Inc. and Ernst and Young.

Singleton-Wood retired again, at the age of 71, in 2004. Since his retirement, he has held a number of positions in Victoria, including communications director for the Conservative Party and public relations director for the Rotary Club. In 2011, he was Chairman of the Congress of Traditional Anglicans. He is co-founder of the Traditional Anglican Church of Canada.
