= Island Edge =

Canadian television production company

Island Edge Inc. is a Canadian television production company founded by Rick Mercer and Gerald Lunz, and incorporated on October 13, 1992 in the province of Newfoundland and Labrador. The company discontinued in 1996 in Newfoundland and Labrador and reincorporated in Nova Scotia.

It has produced Talking to Americans and Made in Canada (both with Salter Street Films) and Rick Mercer Report for CBC Television.
