= Talking to Americans =

Feature on Canadian political satire TV show

Talking to Americans logo, based on the opening of This Hour Has 22 Minutes. The five images shown in this order represent the feature.

Talking to Americans was a regular feature presented by Rick Mercer on the Canadian political satire show This Hour Has 22 Minutes, which was later spun off into a one-hour special that aired on April 1, 2001, on CBC Television.

The purpose of the skit was to satirize American lack of awareness about Canada, by interviewing Americans on the street and convincing them to agree with ridiculous statements about their northern neighbour. Mercer freely acknowledged that he did not think Americans were collectively stupid; in an interview on Nightline, he explained: "I'm just looking for the short answer. Some people hem and haw and they seem to be on to me, and of course we don't include them.... About 80 per cent of the people give me the right answer, by which of course, I mean the wrong answer." He also acknowledged that it would be entirely possible to put together a similar feature getting Canadians to agree on camera to strange statements on topics they knew little about, with the primary difference being that Mercer could not do it himself because Canadians would recognize him.

In his 2021 memoir Talking to Canadians, Mercer described the segment as having had its genesis in 1998, when he was in Washington, DC, to film an unrelated segment for 22 Minutes. While waiting to begin filming, he met a Capitol Hill staffer whose apparent willingness to talk freely about subjects he did not actually know anything about led to an impromptu filmed interview in which the staffer was asked questions about a fictional presidential summit between Bill Clinton and Ralph Benmergui, and was successfully convinced by Mercer that Canadians were unfamiliar with the concept of alphabetical order.

On shooting the segment, Mercer wrote in his memoir: “I suppose I had a nagging feeling that 'Talking to Americans' was a tad unsportsmanlike. They didn’t stand a chance. It wasn’t just shooting fish in a barrel; it was more like throwing dynamite into a shallow pool. All I had to do was stand there with a net and scoop them up as they floated to the surface, completely oblivious to what was happening to them. And they just kept coming. It really was a great gig.”

== Content ==
The intent was to satirize perceived American ignorance of Canada and the rest of the world.

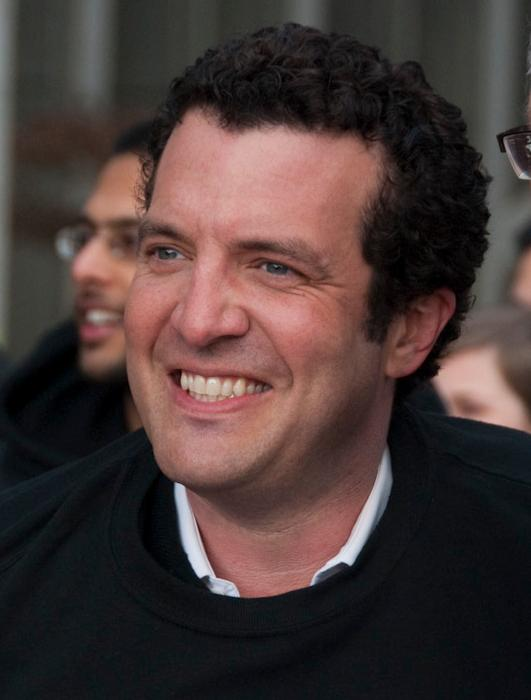
Rick Mercer ran the Talking to Americans interviews

The topics included:

- persuading Americans to congratulate Canada on legalizing VCRs or adopting the 24-hour day (then-Governor of Iowa Tom Vilsack was fooled by this one).
- various political controversies involving one or more Canadian provinces.
- discussion of then-Prime Minister of Canada Jean Chrétien, such as claiming that he was Canada's first Asian Prime Minister or that he just achieved a rare political feat called a "Double Double" (a nickname for a cup of coffee with two scoops of sugar and two creams) in which he received support from both sides of the Canadian parliament. Mercer fooled American TV personalities David Hasselhoff and Jerry Springer into believing that Chrétien was a small-town mayor who just issued a proclamation to them, while Mercer introduced himself as a journalist named "Jean Chrétien" to game show host Louie Anderson, who failed to note the identity of the then-Prime Minister. In one of the feature's most famous moments, future President George W. Bush failed to correct Mercer when he falsely referred to Chrétien as "Jean Poutine" (see below).
- congratulating the Canadian government on building a dome over its "national igloo" (apparently a downsized version of the United States Capitol made out of ice) to protect it from global warming (one of the interview subjects so fooled was then-Governor of Arkansas Mike Huckabee, whom Mercer later stated had asked off-camera if this was a "controversial igloo").
- changing the words in the Canadian national anthem and asking Americans to sing it.
- congratulating Canada for officially joining North America.
- congratulating Canada for moving the capital city from Kingston, Ontario, to Toronto (the actual capital is Ottawa, and then-Vice President Al Gore failed to correct Mercer regarding Toronto being the capital).
- asking Americans for their opinions on the US bombing/invading Saskatchewan.
- asking university students and professors to sign a petition against the Saskatchewan seal hunt and the Toronto polar bear hunt.
- asking Americans to condemn Canada's practice of euthanizing senior citizens by setting them adrift on Northern ice floes.
- asking Americans how many states Canada has (Canada has provinces and territories, not states).
- saying that global warming is causing Canada's polar ice caps to melt and break in two, resulting in a bipolar Canada, and that the two polar caps can be joined back together with the use of tugboats. He further asks if America would assist in curing bipolar Canada with the use of tugboats, and that Canada will be using a big tugboat named Theodore.
- convincing tourists at Mount Rushmore that the mineral rights to the mountain had been sold to a Canadian firm, and that this firm was getting ready to drill for oil in Lincoln's forehead. Alternatively, he would ask their opinion on a plan to expand the monument to include sculptures of Richard Nixon and Brian Mulroney; interviewees all failed to note that the latter was a Canadian Prime Minister, not a US President.
- convincing Americans that the new wooden textured Canadian 5 dollar coin will be named the "woody" (a satirical spin on the "Toonie" two-dollar coin and the "Loonie" one-dollar coin), a play on the common slang term for an erection.

Professors at Columbia, Harvard, Princeton, Berkeley, New York University and Stanford University were consistently fooled by absurdities such as the "Saskatchewan seal hunt". The only Americans who were shown outsmarting Mercer were: a university student who spent her time laughing at him (before finally answering), and a small child who pointed out to his mother, who was also tricked, that Canada had provinces, not states.

== George W. Bush ==
The most famous segment, aired in 2000, featured Mercer asking then-presidential candidate George W. Bush – who had previously stated that "you can't stump me on world leaders" – for his reaction to an endorsement by Canadian Prime Minister "Jean Poutine", which was a play on the name of then-Prime Minister Jean Chrétien (poutine is an order of French fries topped with cheese curds and gravy).

Bush said he looked forward to working together with his future counterpart to the north, praising free trade and Canada. That said, Bush never actually used the name of Poutine and only failed to correct Mercer on the name.

A few years later, when Bush made his first official visit to Canada, he joked during a speech: "There's a prominent citizen who endorsed me in the 2000 election, and I wanted a chance to finally thank him for that endorsement. I was hoping to meet Jean Poutine."

== 2001 special ==
The special was a co-production between Island Edge (Rick Mercer's production company) and Salter Street Films (at the time the producer of 22 Minutes). It was produced and directed by Geoff D'Eon, who also produced and directed the segments for 22 Minutes. It used both previously broadcast clips from 22 Minutes, and new material shot exclusively for the special.

Talking to Americans attracted 2.7 million Canadian viewers, making it the highest-rated special on Canadian television that year.

The show received two Gemini Award nominations at the 16th Gemini Awards in 2001, for Best Music or Variety Program or Series and Best Host in a Variety Program or Series. However, Mercer thought it was inappropriate to make fun of American-Canadian relations so soon after the September 11 attacks, and requested that the Academy of Canadian Cinema and Television pull the nominations.

== See also ==
- Jaywalking (The Tonight Show)
- CNNNN
