= Ron White (actor) =

Canadian actor

- Born: June 9, 1953; Dawson Creek, British Columbia, Canada
- Died: 4 April 2018 (aged 64); Toronto, Ontario, Canada
- Occupation: Actor
- Years active: 1979–2018
- Spouse: Lisa Robertson
- Children: 1

Ron White (June 9, 1953 – April 4, 2018) was a Canadian film and television actor. During his career, he was nominated for two Genie Awards and six Gemini Awards.

== Career ==
Born in Dawson Creek, British Columbia, Canada, White had an extensive career. Some of his most notable television roles included Conrad Peters in Tom Stone Donny Caswell in Black Harbour, and the voice of Ace Hart on Dog City. He had performed in television movies such as Another Country, Trudeau and The Arrow.

== Filmography ==
=== Film ===
- The Evictors (1979) as G-Man
- Tomorrow's a Killer (1987) as Rickert
- Taking Care (1987) as Mr. Jones
- Too Outrageous! (1987) as Unknown
- Cowboys Don't Cry (1988) as Josh Morgan
- Where the Spirit Lives (1989) as Taggert
- Justice Denied (1989) as Donald C. MacNeil, Q.C.
- Love & Murder (1990) as Officer Fred
- Stella (1990) as Tony De Banza
- Unforgiven (1992) as Deputy Clyde Ledbetter
- Guilty as Sin (1993) as Prosecutor DiAngelo
- Ordinary Magic (1993) as Rick
- Blood Brothers (1993) as
- Intersection (1994) as Charlie
- Strange and Rich (1994) as Dave Strange
- Soul Survivor (1995) as Officer Smythe
- Screamers (1995) as Lieutenant Commander Chuck Elbara
- Joan of Arc (1999, TV Mini-Series) as Jean De Dunois
- The Secret Path (1999) as Hank Foley
- Lie with Me (2005) as Ben
- Cake (2005) as Jane's Father
- Defendor (2009) as Judge Wilson
- Erased (2012) as Dick Rhodes
- Life (2015) as Uncle Marcus (final film role)

=== Television ===
Ron White television credits
Year	Title	Role	Notes
1985–1987	Night Heat	Teddy Mujante / Teddy Madden / Larry	3 episodes
1986	9B	Don Fowler	TV movie
1987–1989	Street Legal	Don Chapman / Artie	2 episodes
1989	Where the Spirit Lives	Taggart	TV movie
1989	E.N.G.	Patrick Norton	1 episode
1990–1991	Road to Avonlea	Mr. Tyler	3 episodes
1990–1991	Counterstrike	Detective Larry Larwin	4 episodes "A Little Purity" (S1.E6) "Cry of the Children" (S1.E15) "Verathion" (S1.E20) "Hide and Seek" (S2.E5)
1992–1995	Dog City	Ace Hart (voice)	31 episodes
1994	Race to Freedom: The Underground Railroad	Unknown	TV movie
1995	Kissinger and Nixon	Chief of Staff H.R. 'Bob' Haldeman	TV movie
1995	Lonesome Dove	Elijah Tavish	TV miniseries
1997	The Arrow	RCAF Pilot Lieutenant Jack Woodman	TV miniseries
1998	The Outer Limits	George Nichols	1 episode
1998–1999	Black Harbour	Donny Caswell	5 episodes
2002	Tagged: The Jonathan Wamback Story	Joe Wamback	TV movie
2002	Whitewash: The Clarence Brandley Story	Jim McCloskey	TV movie
2002–2003	Tom Stone	Conrad Peters	6 episodes
2003	Jasper, Texas	ADA Guy James Gray	TV movie
2005	Plague City: SARS in Toronto	Dr. Royce	TV movie
2007	Sybil	Dr. Atcheson	TV movie
2009	The Line	Max	15 episodes
2009	Deadliest Sea	Burns	TV movie
2009	Heartland	Richard Chenoweth	Episode: "Growing Pains"
2011	Haven	Chief Merrill	1 episode
2011	Nikita	Edward Adams	2 episodes
2012–2013	Copper	Captain Ciaran Joseph Sullivan	19 episodes
2014	Republic of Doyle	Vick Saul	7 episodes

=== Videogames ===
- Far Cry 4 (2014) - (voice)

== Awards and nominations ==
Year	Award	Category	Nominated work	Result
1989	10th Genie Awards	Best Performance by an Actor in a Leading Role	Cowboys Don't Cry	Nominated
1992	6th Gemini Awards	Best Guest Performance in a Series by an Actor or Actress	Mom P.I.	Nominated
1994	8th Gemini Awards	Best Performance by an Actor in a Leading Role in a Dramatic Program or Mini-Series	Manic	Nominated
1996	17th Genie Awards	Best Performance by an Actor in a Supporting Role	Screamers	Nominated
1998	12th Gemini Awards	Best Performance by an Actor in a Leading Role in a Dramatic Program or Mini-Series	The Arrow	Nominated
2001	16th Gemini Awards	Best Performance by an Actor in a Leading Role in a Dramatic Program or Mini-Series	Heart: The Marilyn Bell Story	Nominated
2002	17th Gemini Awards	Best Performance by an Actor in a Featured Supporting Role in a Dramatic Program or Mini-Series	Tagged: The Jonathan Wamback Story	Nominated
2009	24th Gemini Awards	Best Performance by an Actor in a Continuing Leading Dramatic Role	The Line	Nominated
