= The Passion of John Ruskin =

- Directed by: Alex Chapple
- Starring: Neve Campbell; Mark McKinney
- Release date: 1994
- Running time: 13 minutes
- Country: Canada
- Language: English

The Passion of John Ruskin is a Canadian short film released in 1994 based on the love life of writer and critic John Ruskin. It is directed by Alex Chapple, starring Mark McKinney as Ruskin, and Neve Campbell as his first wife Effie Gray. The film focuses on Ruskin's persistence to not consummate his marriage with Gray. This film suggests that Ruskin is surprised and disgusted by Gray's pubic hair, because his expectation of the female body was based on Classical art and prepubescent girls.
