= The Last Chapter (TV series) =

2002 Canadian miniseries

- Canadian French: Le dernier chapitre: La Suite
- Created by: Luc Dionne
- Based on: Quebec Biker War
- Country of origin: Canada
- No. of seasons: 2
- No. of episodes: 12

Production
- Executive producer: Luc Dionne
- Producer: Luc Dionne
- Production locations: Ottawa, Ontario, Canada; Montreal, Quebec, Canada
- Production company: Cine Tele-Action

Original release
- Network: CBC (English); Ici Radio-Canada Télé (French)
- Release: March 6, 2002 – February 24, 2003

Related
- The Last Chapter II: The War Continues (2003)

The Last Chapter is a Canadian television miniseries that aired on CBC and Radio-Canada from March 6, 2002 to February 24, 2003. The series describes a gang war with a motorcycle gang, the "Triple Sixers", trying to open chapters in Ontario and Quebec. It is loosely based on the Quebec Biker War.

The Globe and Mail reported that the resemblance between the Triple Sixers and the Hells Angels Motorcycle club was so strong that the club considered seeking an injunction to prevent broadcasting the series.

The series starred Michael Ironside and Roy Dupuis, who play characters that start as friends, but end up leading rival gangs in a deadly gang war. Marina Orsini won a Gemini Award for her role as Ironside's wife. Ironside won an award for his performance in a follow-up series first broadcast in 2003.

One unusual aspect of the series is that the actors were bilingual, and every scene with dialogue was filmed twice, in both French and English, to avoid the difficulties of filming in just one language, and then dubbing into the other language, in the studio.
