= Trudeau (miniseries) =

Canadian TV miniseries

- Genre: Biographical drama
- Written by: Wayne Grigsby
- Directed by: Jerry Ciccoritti
- Starring: Colm Feore; Polly Shannon; Patrick McKenna
- Composer: Sandy Moore
- Country of origin: Canada
- Original languages: English; French
- No. of seasons: 1
- No. of episodes: 2

Production
- Producers: David MacLeod; Wayne Grigsby
- Cinematography: Norayr Kasper
- Editor: Dean Soltys
- Camera setup: Single-camera
- Running time: 103–105 minutes
- Production company: Big Motion Pictures

Original release
- Network: CBC Television
- Release: March 31 – April 1, 2002

Related
- Trudeau II: Maverick in the Making (2005)

Trudeau is a 2002 television biographical drama miniseries dramatizing the life of former Canadian Prime Minister Pierre Elliott Trudeau. It aired on CBC Television on Sunday and Monday evenings and was written by Wayne Grigsby and directed by Jerry Ciccoritti.

The miniseries was one of the highest-rated Canadian television programs of the year, resulting in 8 wins and 3 nominations. Two of the wins were from Directors Guild of Canada; one being the DGC Craft Award, as Jerry Ciccoritti won Outstanding Achievement in Direction and Dean Soltys won Outstanding Achievement in Picture Editing and the other being the DGC Team Award. As well, it won several Gemini Awards including Best Actor, Best Writing and Best Direction. Colm Feore also won Monte-Carlo TV Festival's Best Performance by an Actor. "With all its sham, drudgery and broken dreams, Trudeau is a beautiful show – the best Canadian political teleplay since Denys Arcand's Duplessis 25 years ago, and maybe the best ever."

The miniseries follows Pierre Trudeau through the major events of his political mandates up to the patriation of the Canadian Constitution. A few of the major characters in the film (notably "Greenbaum" and "Duncan") are fictional, or composite characters.

It was filmed in various locations in Canada, but mainly in Halifax, Nova Scotia and at Parliament Hill in Ottawa. Distributed in both official languages English and French, the two episodes first aired on 31 March and 1 April 2002.

As background research, writer Wayne Grigsby spoke to numerous people who had known Trudeau, but the Trudeau family did not reply to the requests by the CBC.

A prequel, Trudeau II: Maverick in the Making, came out in 2005, examining Trudeau's early life. This $8-million, four-hour CBC production was originally designed as a "double shoot," to be filmed in both French and English versions; however, it ended up being made in English only – even though most of the actors, including lead Stéphane Demers, are Québécois. (Demers inherited the role from Colm Feore, who was unavailable due to playing the villain in The Chronicles of Riddick.)

== Cast ==
Trudeau features Colm Feore in the title role. The cast includes Polly Shannon as Margaret Sinclair Trudeau, R.H. Thomson as Mitchell Sharp, Eric Peterson as T.C. (Tommy) Douglas, John Neville as the British high commissioner, Don McKellar as a communications consultant, Aidan Devine as a reporter, and Patrick McKenna as Trudeau's executive assistant.

- Colm Feore as Pierre Elliott Trudeau
- Polly Shannon as Margaret Trudeau
- Patrick McKenna as Duncan
- Don McKellar as Greenbaum
- Peter Outerbridge as Jim Coutts
- Raymond Cloutier as Gérard Pelletier
- Raymond Bouchard as Jean Marchand
- Luc Proulx as René Lévesque
- R. H. Thomson as Mitchell Sharp
- Guy Richer as Jean Chrétien
- Jean Marchand (Note: This is an actor, who should not be confused with the character of the same name listed earlier.) as Marc Lalonde
- Geraint Wyn Davies as Bill Davis
- Eric Peterson as Tommy Douglas
- Robert Bockstael as Roy McMurtry
- Ron White as James Sinclair
- Sara Botsford as Kathleen Sinclair
- Michael Copeman as Robert Stanfield
- Brian Heighton as Brian Peckford
- Gary Levert as Roy Romanow
- Jean-Guy Moreau as Jean Drapeau
- Stephen Morgan as Bryce Mackasey
- William Parsons as Lester B. Pearson
- Hugh Thompson as Ron Basford
- Karl Pruner as John Turner
- David McIlwraith as Peter Lougheed

Archival footage of Joe Clark, Knowlton Nash and Queen Elizabeth II is used in the film. Cynthia Dale and Peter Mansbridge also have small roles; Mansbridge plays himself.

== Accuracy ==
In several interviews at the time of the premiere, actual Trudeau PMO bureaucrats commented on the general accuracy of the film. However, there is one major exception. Most characters in the film refer to Trudeau as "Mr. Prime Minister." This is improper Canadian government protocol; the prime minister is simply referred to as "Prime Minister", although it is not uncommon for the Prime Minister to be addressed by the former as well as the latter. It is notable that actor R. H. Thomson refused to use the scripted address and ad-libbed instead.
