= Guy Richer =

Canadian actor (born 1954)

Guy Richer (born August 10, 1954) is a Canadian actor. Aside from a few other roles, he is notable for his portrayal of Canadian Prime Minister Jean Chrétien in the 2002 television miniseries Trudeau.
