= Torso: The Evelyn Dick Story =

- Directed by: Alex Chapple
- Written by: Dennis Foon
- Starring: Kathleen Robertson; Callum Keith Rennie; Brenda Fricker; Victor Garber
- Release date: March 18, 2002
- Running time: 90 minutes
- Country: Canada
- Language: English

Torso: The Evelyn Dick Story is a 2002 Canadian made-for-television crime thriller film directed by Alex Chapple and starring Kathleen Robertson. It is based on the 1946/1947 murder trial of Evelyn Dick that remains a lurid murder case in Canadian history. After children find only the torso of her missing husband, John, Evelyn is arrested for his murder. The film was originally scheduled to be aired on September 11, 2001, but was delayed until March 18, 2002 due to the terrorist attacks on the original air date.

== Plot summary ==
In 1940s Hamilton, Ontario, after her husband's corpse is discovered in the woods without its head or limbs, beautiful would-be socialite Evelyn Dick (Kathleen Robertson) is arrested by Canadian police for the murder. Her ever-changing jailhouse testimony leads Inspector Woods (Callum Keith Rennie) in various directions as the devoted detective tries to piece together a coherent chain of events and motives. But once Dick's manipulative mother (Brenda Fricker) is implicated in the scheme, Dick's story changes again, this time with twist that leads to a tragic denouement. Her future in grave danger—her sentence could be death by hanging—Dick hires attorney J.J. Robinette (Victor Garber) for one last attempt at freedom.

== Cast ==
- Kathleen Robertson as Evelyn Dick. Robertson was nominated for a Gemini Award for her performance in the film.
- Victor Garber as J.J. Robinette
- Brenda Fricker as Alexandra MacLean
- Callum Keith Rennie as Inspector Wood
- Ken James as Donald MacLean
- Jonathan Potts as Detective Sgt. Preston
- Jim Boeven as John Dick
- Joseph Scoren as Bill Bohozuk
- Bruce Gray as Third Trial Judge
- Gerry Quigley as Willy Landeg
- Joan Gregson as Prison Matron
- Hannah Lochner as Heather Dick
- David Gardner as Bohozuk's Lawyer
- William Pappas as First Trial Judge
- Bruce Clayton as Evelyn's Lawyer
