= Gino Empry =

Gino Emperatore (1925 - 2006), commonly known as Gino Empry, was a Canadian entertainment impresario and promoter, who was a longtime president of his own public relations firm to publicize and promote Canadian entertainment.

A native of Toronto, Ontario, Empry began his career as an actor in amateur theatre, but worked as an auditor and systems analyst while trying to get his break as an actor; after several years of struggle, he met with a career consultant who suggested that he would likely have more success in the business side of entertainment than as a performer. In 1964, he was hired by Ed Mirvish as booking agent for the Royal Alexandra Theatre, and served in that role until becoming entertainment director of the Imperial Room in 1970. He held the role with the Imperial Room until its closure in 1989. He continued to have occasional stage acting roles, most notably making brief appearances in the inaugural season of The Second City's Toronto company.

Empry was also a promoter, agent or manager for Canadian and international celebrities, including Tony Bennett, Peggy Lee, Deborah Kerr, Cher, Jack Lemmon, Frank Sinatra, Ella Fitzgerald, Bob Hope, Eartha Kitt, Peter O'Toole, Ronnie Hawkins, William Hutt, Karen Kain, Anne Murray, Craig Russell and Roch Voisine, and a promoter for charitable organizations including the Actors Fund of Canada, the Canadian Cancer Society, DareArts, Easter Seals, the Ontario Musical Arts Centre and the Variety Club of Ontario.

In 2002 he published a memoir, I Belong to the Stars. In his later career he also returned to occasional acting roles, including a guest appearance as himself in an episode of Made in Canada and a starring role as a washed-up children's entertainer who has taken up burglary in the short comedy film Klepto the Clown.

Empry never married, but he was in a longtime relationship with psychic reader Nikki Pezaro. He was also father to two children from a prior relationship with a woman named Gloria, although both were placed for adoption as he and Gloria were not married to each other at the time.

He died on October 14, 2006, a few months after suffering a stroke.
