= Alex Chapple =

Canadian director and writer

- Born: Dundas, Ontario, Canada
- Years active: 1994–present

Alex Chapple is a Canadian director and writer.

== Early life ==
Alex Chapple is a native of Dundas in Hamilton, Ontario.

== Career ==
Chapple was the director of the 2002 film Torso: The Evelyn Dick Story. In 2009, he directed the film Diverted, a fictionalised account of Operation Yellow Ribbon following the September 11 attacks.

== Filmography ==
Film

- Made in Canada, Volume 1: Best of the CFC (2002)

Short film

- The Passion of John Ruskin (1994)

Television

Year	Title	Episode(s)
2020	FBI: Most Wanted	Ironbound (2020)
2020	Chicago P.D.	Lines (2020)
2019-2020	Chicago Med	Who Should Be the Judge (2020); We're Lost in the Dark (2019)
2019-2026	FBI	"Rendition" (2026) "Defector" (2026); Fidelity" (2026); Confetti" (2026) "Wolf Pack" (2025) "Falsetto" (2025) "Takeover" (2025) "Covered" (2025) "Hitched" (2025) "Redoubt" (2025) "Doubted" (2024) "Abandoned" (2024) "Ring of Fire" (2024) "Reaper" (2024) "Best Laid Plans" (2024) "Stay in Your Lane" (2024); All the Rage" (2024); God Complex" (2023); Intiment Threat: Part 1" (2023); Breakdown (2023); Fortunate Son (2022); Double Bind (2022); Prodigal Son (2022); Hero's Journey (2022); One Night Stand (2022); Pride and Prejudice (2022); Trauma (2021); All That Glitters (2021); Straight Flush (2021); Brother's Keeper (2021); Liar's Poker (2020); Never Trust a Stranger (2020); Studio Gangster (2020); Fallout (2020); Salvation (2019); The Lives of Others (2019)
2015-2017	Elementary	Dead Man's Tale (2017); Render, and Then Seize Her (2016); The Games Underfoot (2015)
2015	Backstrom	Bella (2015)
2013-2016	Chicago Fire	Lift Each Other (2016); Nobody Touches Anything (2014); Not Like This (2013); A Hell of a Ride (2013); Under the Knife (2013)
2013	The Americans	Duty and Honor (2013)
2012	The Finder	Eye of the Storm (2012)
2011–2019	Law & Order: Special Victims Unit	End Game (2019); Diss (2019); Part 33 (2019); Alta Knockers (2018); Man Down (2018); Man Up (2018); Remember Me Too (2018); Remember Me (2018); Send in the Clowns (2018); The Undiscovered Country (2018); Something Happened (2017); Gone Fishin (2017); Conversion (2017); Net Worth (2017); Heightened Emotions (2016); Heartfelt Passages (2016); Assaulting Reality (2016); Manhattan Transfer (2016); Nationwide Manhunt (2016); Criminal Pathology (2015); Perverted Justice (2015); Agent Provocateur (2015); Girls Disappeared (2014); Reasonable Doubt (2014); Gambler's Fallacy (2014); Comic Perversion (2014); Dissonant Voices (2013); Born Psychopath (2013); Lessons Learned (2012); Acceptable Loss (2012); Strange Beauty (2012); Spiraling Down (2011); Russian Brides (2011); Flight (2011)
2011-2021	Blue Bloods	Redemption (2021); Lost Souls (2017); Genetics (2017); Help Me, Help You (2016); Unsung Heroes (2015); All the News That's Fit to Click (2015); Payback (2015); The Poor Door (2015); Loose Lips (2014); Custody Battle (2014); Unfinished Business (2014); Lost and Found (2013); Devil's Breath (2013); Men in Black (2013); Family Business (2012); Black and Blue (2011)
2010–2011	Law & Order: LA	Reseda (2011); Benedict Canyon (2011); Echo Park (2010)
2010	Being Erica	Bear Breasts (2010)
2009–2010	Stargate Universe	Subversion (2010); Life (2009)
2009–2010	Law & Order	Brilliant Disguise (2010); Fed (2009); Anchors Away (2009); Crimebusters (2009); Pledge (2009)
2009	Bones	The Bond in the Boot (2009)
2009	Being Erica	Being Dr. Tom (2009)
2009	Diverted	
2008–2009	Crusoe	Smoke and Mirrors (2009); Bad Blood (2008)
2007	Bionic Woman	Trust Issues
2007	Kidnapped	Impasse
2006	Shades of Black: The Conrad Black Story	TV movie
2006	Blade: The Series	Conclave (2006); Delivery (2006)
2004–2008	Law & Order: Criminal Intent	Ten Count (2008); Watch (2006); Sex Club (2005); View from Up Here (2005); Inert Dwarf (2004)
2003	Mafia Doctor	TV movie
2002–2003	Street Time	High Holly Roller (2003); Watching the Watchers (2003); Betrayal (2002)
2002	Torso: The Evelyn Dick Story	
2001	Leap Years	
1999	Murder Most Likely	
1999	I Was a Sixth Grade Alien	Alien Dinner Massacre! (1999); Aliens to Blow Up Earth! (1999)
1996–1999	Jake and the Kid	The Circus (1999); Looks Can Be Deceiving (1996)
1996–1999	Traders	History Lesson (1999); In Toto (1998); In Vacuo (1998); Dark Sanctuary (1997); Dancing with Mr. D. (1996)
1996–1997	Ready or Not	Get a Life (1997); First Serious Party (1996)
1996	Flash Forward	Saboteurs (1996); Skate Bait (1996)
1995	Side Effects	Time Enough to Say Good-bye
1995	Nancy Drew	Who's Hot, Who's Not (1995); Welcome to the Callisto (1995)
1994	The Odyssey	Tug of War
1994–1995	Liberty Street	All Work and No Play; Caged Heat; Even Bradys Get the Blues; In the Heat of the Night; Reality Bites
1993	Manic	
