= Michael Donovan (producer) =

Canadian film producer, executive and screenwriter

Michael Patrick Donovan OC
- Occupations: Film producer; executive; screenwriter
- Known for: Founder of WildBrain and WildBrain Studios

Michael Patrick Donovan OC is a Canadian film producer, executive, and screenwriter.

== Career ==
Salter Street Films

Michael Donovan co-founded Salter Street Films with his brother Paul Donovan in 1983. Though the company got off to a slow start, Donovan eventually had major success with projects such as the Canadian satirical comedy series This Hour Has 22 Minutes. He co-created the series Made in Canada.

Salter Street Films was acquired by Alliance Atlantis in 2001, and was closed by them two years later, in 2003.

Halifax Film Company / DHX Media

In May 2004, after Alliance Atlantis closed Salter Street Films, Michael Donovan founded Halifax Film Company with many of the former Salter Street employees.

In 2006, Halifax Film Company merged with Toronto, Ontario-based Decode Entertainment to become DHX Media, where Donovan served as the company's CEO from 2006 to 2014 and again from 2018 to 2019, and as Executive Chair of the company from 2014 to 2019.

In August 2019, Donovan stepped down from being CEO and Executive Chair of DHX Media, which rebranded as WildBrain the following month. He remained as a founding chair on the board of directors until October 17, 2019, when he stepped down from the board of directors and left the company.

== Awards and nominations ==
Donovan won an Academy Award for Best Documentary Feature for producing the 2002 documentary Bowling for Columbine. He was nominated for a Genie Award for Best Screenplay for writing the 2007 film Shake Hands with the Devil.

== Honours ==
On December 28, 2019, Governor General Julie Payette announced that Michael Donovan had been appointed as an Officer of the Order of Canada.
