= Legends of Hockey =

- Genre: Sports documentary
- Directed by: Derik Murray
- Country of origin: Canada
- Original language: English
- No. of episodes: 10

Production
- Executive producers: Derik Murray; John N. Hamilton
- Producer: Brian Daisley
- Running time: 600 minutes

Original release
- Release: 2001 – 2001

Legends of Hockey is a Canadian ten-part/ten-hour mini-series released in 2001 profiling the history of ice hockey.

The Legends of Hockey features the following people:

== Series one ==
=== Episode One - Lord Stanley's Legacy ===
- Dan Bain
- Hobey Baker
- Frank Fredrickson
- Ambrose O'Brien
- Frank Patrick
- Lester Patrick
- Art Ross
- Lord Stanley
- Cyclone Taylor
- Georges Vezina

=== Episode Two - The New Era ===
- Bobby Bauer
- King Clancy
- Woody Dumart
- Foster Hewitt
- Red Horner
- Busher Jackson
- Howie Morenz
- Joe Primeau
- Milt Schmidt
- Eddie Shore
- Conn Smythe
- Nels Stewart

=== Episode Three - Men Of Steel ===
- Andy Bathgate
- Bernie "Boom Boom" Geoffrion
- Gordie Howe
- Ted "Teeder" Kennedy
- Ted Lindsay
- Jacques Plante
- Chuck Rayner
- Henri Richard
- Maurice "The Rocket" Richard

=== Episode Four - The Glory Years ===
- Jean Beliveau
- Johnny Bower
- Johnny Bucyk
- Gerry Cheevers
- Bobby Hull
- Red Kelly
- Frank Mahovlich
- Stan Mikita
- Bobby Orr

=== Episode Five - The Modern Era ===
- Bobby Clarke
- Marcel Dionne
- Guy Lafleur
- Lanny McDonald
- Brad Park
- Gilbert Perreault
- Larry Robinson
- Darryl Sittler
- Vladislav Tretiak

== Series two ==
=== Episode One - Passing The Torch ===
- Glenn Hall
- Dave Keon
- Dickie Moore
- Marcel Pronovost
- Terry Sawchuk
- Norm Ullman
- Gump Worsley

=== Episode Two - The Path To Glory ===
- Yvan Cournoyer
- Alex Delvecchio
- Ken Dryden
- Emile Francis
- Eddie Giacomin
- Rod Gilbert
- Tim Horton

=== Episode Three - More Than A Game ===
- Mike Bossy
- Mario Lemieux
- Denis Potvin
- Billy Smith
- Bryan Trottier

=== Episode Four - Character And Courage ===
- Scotty Bowman
- Michel Goulet
- Wayne Gretzky
- Glen Sather
- Peter Šťastný

=== Episode Five - On To Greatness ===
- Bill Barber
- Phil Esposito
- Tony Esposito
- Bob Gainey
- Guy Lapointe
- Serge Savard
- Steve Shutt

== Recognition ==
The series has been awarded and nominated multiple times. It was the winner of the Gemini Award for Best Sports Program or Series in 2000 and a Gemini nomination for Best Direction in a Documentary Series and winner of two CAN PRO awards for Best Mini-feature (telecast outside daily newscast) and Best Sports Series. It also received honourable mention Banff Film Festival.
