= Stephen Reynolds (director) =

Canadian television director

Stephen Reynolds is a Canadian film and television director, most noted as the director of the theatrical feature film The Divine Ryans.

His other credits have included Odd Squad, Haven, Combat Hospital, Heartland, This Hour Has 22 Minutes, The Eleventh Hour, Black Harbour, CODCO and Made in Canada.

He has won a Daytime Emmy Award for his directing work on Odd Squad, as well as four Canadian Comedy Awards, three for his work on Made in Canada and one for This Hour Has 22 Minutes, and two Gemini Awards as producer of CODCO (both shared with Michael Donovan, Jack Kellum and J. William Ritchie).
