= Salter Street Films =

Canadian TV and film production company

Salter Street Films LLC
- Industry: Television production
- Founded: 1983; 43 years ago
- Founder: Michael Donovan; Paul Donovan
- Defunct: 2003; 23 years ago
- Fate: Shut down; operations taken over by Alliance Atlantis
- Successor: Halifax Film Company
- Parent: Alliance Atlantis (2001–2003)
- Website: salter.com (archived)

Salter Street Films was a Canadian television and film production company based in Halifax, Nova Scotia.

== History ==
Salter Street Films was founded by brothers Paul and Michael Donovan in 1983. Paul was trained as a director at the London Film School; Michael graduated from Dalhousie University’s Law School and started as a producer of Paul's film projects. Salter Street Films was named after the street in Halifax, Nova Scotia, where Paul and Michael had been living.

The company started life with early problems. Its first major feature film was Def-Con 4 (1985), which eventually became profitable, but other films such as George's Island (1989), Buried on Sunday (1992), and Paint Cans (1994), though critically acclaimed, were money-losers. The company's salvation turned out to be the sci-fi TV series Lexx, which was a hit in Germany, Russia, and Eastern Europe. This Canadian-German co-production went on to become a lucrative money-maker through international sales and was one of the first shows to develop a cult following almost exclusively through online.

Concurrently, the Donovan brothers found success with the satirical This Hour Has 22 Minutes becoming a hit on CBC Television as well as other TV series such as CODCO, Emily of New Moon, Made in Canada, Blackfly, children's TV series Pirates, and a TV special Talking to Americans. These shows found homes on the CBC as well as other Canadian networks and cable channels. Salter Street also created the stop motion-animated preschool TV series Poko, which is still in production. In 1994, it has a 20% interest in The Popcorn Channel, which was rumoured to be on the air in the first quarter of 1995. In the 1990s, it meant to mine European co-production with four telefilms, which were planning on to be in production in 1995.

Based on their reputation for political satire, U.S. documentary filmmaker Michael Moore approached Salter Street to produce his project Bowling for Columbine. Michael Donovan agreed and arranged financing in Canada and Germany. The documentary won both the Anniversary Prize at the Cannes Film Festival and the Oscar for Best Documentary Feature Film.

In 2000, a year after the Donovan brothers had taken the company public, Salter Street was awarded the broadcast license for IFC by the Canadian Radio-television and Telecommunications Commission. This potentially lucrative award, combined with Salter Street's reputation as a content-provider, attracted interest from the powerful media corporation Alliance Atlantis. Alliance bought Salter Street from the majority shareholders the following year. Paul and Michael Donovan remained on as producers.

In 2003, two years after the purchase, Alliance closed the operation, transferring Salter Street's ongoing TV productions to Alliance. Paul Donovan has continued as an independent producer and director. In May 2004, Michael Donovan formed the Halifax Film Company with all of the former Salter Street employees. In 2006, Halifax Film merged with Decode Entertainment to form DHX Media (now as WildBrain). DHX sold the studio in 2018 to IoM Media Ventures and was rebranded to the Island of Misfits.
