= Henry Sarwer-Foner =

Canadian television director

Henry Sarwer-Foner is a Canadian television director. He has won numerous Canadian Screen Awards, Gemini, DGC and Canadian Comedy Awards as the director of This Hour Has 22 Minutes, Made in Canada and Corner Gas.

In 2007 Henry Sarwer-Foner directed the CBC TV special Bob & Doug McKenzie's Two-Four Anniversary. The show featured notable guest appearances by Geddy Lee and others, with hosting by Canadian former prime minister Paul Martin.

== Television ==
- It's Only Rock & Roll - 1987
- Street Cents - 1989
- This Hour Has 22 Minutes - 1993-2004
- Traders - 1997-1998
- Made in Canada - 1998-2003
- The Associates - 2001
- Corner Gas - 2004
- Rick Mercer Report - 2004 - 2018
- Hatching, Matching and Dispatching - 2005
- Bob & Doug McKenzie's Two-Four Anniversary - 2007
- Less Than Kind - 2008
- The Beaverton - 2016-2019
