= Mark Farrell (comedian) =

Canadian comedian and writer (born 1966)

Mark Farrell (born 1966) is a Canadian comedian and writer, who honed his talent in the Yuk Yuk's comedy club in Halifax, Nova Scotia before moving to Toronto in 1989. In 1992, Farrell helped lead an exodus from the Yuk Yuk's chain, along with other prominent comics such as Brent Butt. After appearing in CBC's Comics! as well as CTV's Comedy Now!, as well as NBC's Friday Night Videos, he was cast in two Ken Finkleman series, Married Life and the first season of The Newsroom.

Eventually his writing skills were noted, and as he became a writer for This Hour Has 22 Minutes, eventually moving all the way up to Executive Producer, until he left the show in 2010. His work on 22 Minutes led to many other writing gigs, including another job as Supervising Producer for the first season of Corner Gas, a show for which he continued to write and helped develop.

He was an Executive Producer and writer for the show Seed, a show he co-developed with the show's creator, Joseph Raso. The program ran for 26 episodes in 2013-14.
