= 20th Gemini Awards =

2005 awards for Canadian television

- Date: November 19, 2005
- Venue: John Bassett Theatre, Toronto

Television/radio coverage
- Network: Global Television Network

The Academy of Canadian Cinema & Television's 20th Gemini Awards were held on November 19, 2005, to honour achievements in Canadian television. The awards show, which was co-hosted by several celebrities, took place at the John Bassett Theatre and was broadcast on Global.

== Best Dramatic Series ==
- The Eleventh Hour – Alliance Atlantis Communications. Producers: Ilana Frank, Semi Chellas, Ray Sager, David Wellington, Daphne Park, Peter R. Simpson
- Da Vinci’s Inquest – Haddock Entertainment, Barna-Alper Productions, Alliance Atlantis Productions, Canadian Broadcasting Corporation. Producers: Chris Haddock, Laszlo Barna, Arvi Liimatainen, Laura Lightbown
- Degrassi: The Next Generation – Bell Media, Epitome Pictures. Producers: Stephen Stohn, Linda Schuyler, Aaron Martin
- This Is Wonderland – Muse Entertainment, Indian Grove Productions. Producers: Bernard Zukerman, Michael Prupas, Dani Romain, George F. Walker
- Godiva's – Keatley Entertainment, CHUM. Producers: Julia Keatley, Gigi Boyd, Michael MacLennan
- ReGenesis – The Movie Network, Movie Central, Shaftesbury Films. Producers: Christina Jennings, Tom Chehak, Scott Garvie, Laura Harbin, Shane Kinnear, Virginia Rankin

== Best Dramatic Mini-Series ==
- Sex Traffic – Big Motion Pictures. Producers: Wayne Grigsby, Michele Buck, David MacLeod, Derek Wax
- H_{2}O – Whizbang Films. Producers: Paul Gross, Frank Siracusa
- Lives of the Saints – Capri Films, PowerCorp, RTI. Producers: Gabriella Martinelli, Giovanna Arata

== Best TV Movie ==
- Tripping the Wire: A Stephen Tree Mystery – Galafilm. Producers: Arnie Gelbart, Francine Allaire, Anne Marie La Traverse
- Murdoch Mysteries: Except the Dying – Shaftesbury Films. Producers: Christina Jennings, Scott Garvie, Laura Harbin, Virginia Rankin, Kim Todd
- Burn: The Robert Wraight Story – Alberta Filmworks, CTV Television Network, Monkeywrench Productions, Tapestry Pictures. Producers: Heather Haldane, Randy Bradshaw, Doug MacLeod, Mary Young Leckie
- The Last Casino – Astral Films. Producers: Greg Dummett, Madeline Henrie
- The Life – CTV Television Network, Haddock Entertainment, Odd Man Out Productions, Sarrazin Couture Entertainment. Producers: Chris Haddock, Laura Lightbown, Lynn Barr, Arvi Liimatainen, Pierre Sarrazin

== Best Comedy Program or Series ==
- Corner Gas – CTV Television Network, Prairie Pants Productions. Producers: Brent Butt, Mark Farrell, David Storey, Virginia Thompson, Paul Mather
- History Bites – The History Channel. Producers: Rick Green, David C. Smith
- Puppets Who Kill – Eggplant Picture & Sound. Producers: John Pattison, Marianne Culbert, John Leitch, Shawn Thompson
- The Newsroom – 100% Film and Television, Canadian Broadcasting Corporation, Showcase, Telefilm Canada. Producers: Ken Finkleman, Jan Peter Meyboom
- This Hour Has 22 Minutes – Alliance Atlantis, Canadian Broadcasting Corporation. Producers: Michael Donovan, Geoff D’Eon, Mark Farrell, Jack Kellum, Susan MacDonald, Jenipher Ritchie

== Best Music, Variety Program or Series ==
- 2004 MuchMusic Video Awards – MuchMusic). Producers: John Kampilis, Dave Russell
- 2004 Canadian Country Music Awards – Canadian Country Music Association, CBC Television. Producers: Michael Watt, Aidan Cosgrove, Anne Hunter
- Live at the Rehearsal Hall – Bravo!. Producers: Robert Benson, John Gunn
- The Chieftains in Canada – Canadian Broadcasting Corporation. Producers: Michael Lewis, Geoff D’Eon
- Canadian Idol – Insight Productions, 19 Entertainment, FremantleMedia North America, Canadian Broadcasting Corporation. Producers: John Brunton, Barbara Bowlby, Sue Brophey, Martha Kehoe, Mark Lysakowski

== Best Performing Arts Program or Series, or Arts Documentary Program or Series ==
- Camp Hollywood – Hirsh Markle Films. Producers: Steve Markle, David Julian Hirsh
- Alter Egos – Copperheart Entertainment, National Film Board of Canada. Producers: Steven Hoban, Mark Smith, Adam Symansky
- Opening Night – The Four Seasons Mosaic – Canadian Broadcasting Corporation. Producers: Robin Neinstein, Robert Cohen, Shari Cohen
- Drawing Out The Demons: A Film about the Artist Attila Richard Lukacs – Screen Siren Pictures. Producers: Trish Dolman, Stephanie Symns
- Jean-Pierre Perreault: Giant Steps – National Film Board of Canada. Producers: Lisa Cochrane, Yves Bisaillon

== Best Talk Series ==
- Health on the Line – HOTL Productions. Producers: Linda Boyle, Lesley Birchard, Bonnie Hewitt, Terra Renton, Karen Yarosky, Jennifer Fraser, Hedy Korbee
- Mansbridge One on One – Canadian Broadcasting Corporation. Producers: Jonathan Whitten, Jasmin Tuffaha
- Hot Type – CBC Newsworld. Producers: Alice Hopton, Janet Thomson, Donna Lee Aprile
- Medical Hotseat – Medical Hotseat Productions. Producers: Hedy Korbee, Helen Bagshaw, Linda Boyle, Jeanette Diehl, Greg Dennis, Jennifer Fraser
- Vicki Gabereau – Canadian Broadcasting Corporation. Producers: Cynthia Ott, Jordan Schwartz, Mark Fuller

== Best Reality Program or Series ==
- Venture – The Town Doctor – Canadian Broadcasting Corporation. Producers: Patsy Pehleman, Tracie Tighe
- Buy Me – Whalley-Abbey Media. Producers: Debbie Travis, Hans Rosenstein, Jean-Francois Monette
- Made to Order – Mercer Street Films. Producers: Michael Rubino, Henry Less

== Best General/Human Interest Series ==
- >play presents – Canadian Broadcasting Corporation. Producer: Donna Lee Aprile
- SexTV – CHUM Television, Corus Entertainment. Producers: Cynthia Loyst, Brad Brough, Marcia Martin
- Body of Knowledge – Canadian Broadcasting Corporation. Producers: Charles Bishop, Mary Lynk
- Heartbeats – Breakthrough Entertainment. Producers: Ira Levy, Kirsten Scollie, Barri Cohen, Peter Williamson, Ron Singer
- Past Life Investigation – Canadian Broadcasting Corporation. Producers: Sarah Kapoor, Catherine May, Tracie Tighe

== Donald Brittain Award for Best Social/Political Documentary Program ==
- Runaway Grooms – Asli Films. Producer: Ali Kazimi
- Rage Against the Darkness – J.S. Kastner Productions. Producers: Deborah Parks, John Kastner
- El Contrato – National Film Board of Canada. Producer: Karen King
- No Place Called Home – National Film Board of Canada. Producer: Peter Starr
- One More River: The Deal That Split the Cree – Rezolution Pictures. Producers: Catherine Bainbridge, Ernest Webb
- The Take – Barna-Alper Productions, Canadian Broadcasting Corporation, National Film Board of Canada, Klein Lewis Productions. Producers: Naomi Klein, Avi Lewis, Laszlo Barna, Silva Basmajian

== Best Documentary Series ==
- Witness – Canadian Broadcasting Corporation. Producers: Marie Natanson, Hilary Armstrong
- Legendary Sin Cities: Paris, Berlin and Shanghai – Canadian Broadcasting Corporation, Demi-Monde Productions. Producers: Ted Remerowski, Marrin Canell
- The Nature of Things – Canadian Broadcasting Corporation. Producer: Michael Allder
- The Passionate Eye – Canadian Broadcast Corporation. Producers: Catherine Olsen, Charlotte Odele, Diane Rotteau
- Rough Cuts – CBC Newsworld. Producer: Andrew Johnson

== Best History Documentary Program ==
- Stolen Spirits of Haida Gwaii – Primitive Entertainment. Producers: Michael McMahon, Kristina McLaughlin
- Turning Points of History – D-Day on Juno Beach – Barna-Alper Productions, Connections Productions. Producers: Laszlo Barna, Alan Mendelsohn
- Escape from Iran: The Hollywood Option – Partners in Motion. Producers: Nova Herman, Ron Goetz
- To Build a Nation: Vimy Carved in Stone – Nation Building Productions. Producers: Janice Tufford, Laszlo Barna
- Zero Hour – Massacre at Columbine High – Cineflix. Producers: Andre Barro, Simon Berthon, David Hickman, Dan Korn

== Best Biography Documentary Program ==
- Ronnie Hawkins: Still Alive and Kickin' – Real to Reel Productions. Producer: Anne Pick
- Life and Times – Lord Black of Crossharbour: The Life and Times of Conrad Black – Canadian Broadcasting Corporation. Producers: Halya Kuchmij, Douglas Arrowsmith, Linda Laughlin, Marie Natanson
- Life and Times – Madiba: The Life & Times of Nelson Mandela – Canadian Broadcasting Corporation. Producer: Robin Benger
- Life and Times – The Biographer's Voice: The Life and Times of Peter C. Newman – Canadian Broadcasting Corporation. Producers: Gordon Henderson, Mike Sheerin
- The Greatest Canadian – The Great Tommy Douglas – Canadian Broadcasting Corporation. Producers: Guy O'Sullivan, Rachel Houlihan
- The True Intrepid: Sir William Stephenson, Declassified – MidCanada Entertainment, Global Television Network. Producer: Kevin Dunn

== Best Science, Technology, Nature, Environment or Adventure Documentary Program ==
- The Origins of AIDS – Canadian Broadcasting Corporation, Galafilm, Channel Four Television Corporation, Frame 2, Les Films de la Passerelle, Multimédia France Productions, Produce+, Radio Télévision Belge Francophone, Pathé Archives. Producers: Arnie Gelbart, Michel Crepon, Christine Le Goff, Christine Pereaux
- The Nature of Things – Sex Lies and Secrecy: Dissecting Hysterectomy – CBC. Producers: Carol Moore-Ede, Michael Allder
- The Nature of Things – Clot Busters – CBC. Producers: David Tucker, Michael Allder
- A Day Inside: Calgary Stampede. Producers: Lance Mueller, Jean Merriman
- Diet of Souls – Triad Film Productions. Producer: Peter d'Entremont

== Best News Information Series ==
- W5 – CTV Television Network. Producers: Malcolm Fox, Anton Koschany
- the fifth estate – Canadian Broadcasting Corporation. Producers: David Studer, Sally Reardon
- Venture – Canadian Broadcasting Corporation. Producers: Patsy Pehleman, Dianne Buckner
- Marketplace – Canadian Broadcasting Corporation. Producers: Tassie Notar, Leslie Peck, Sheilagh D’Arcy McGee
- Eurohealth – Global Television Network. Producers: David Ingram, Brian Coxford

== Best News Magazine Segment ==
- The National/CBC News – Strange Destiny – Canadian Broadcasting Corporation. Producers: Brian Kelly, Carmen Merrifield, Gary Akenhead, Andy Hincenbergs, Brian Stewart
- The National/CBC News – Ray of Light – Canadian Broadcasting Corporation. Producers: Michael Taylor-Noonan, Terry Milewski, Sat Nandlall, Cedric Monteiro
- The National/CBC News – Healing Hikkaduwa – Canadian Broadcasting Corporation. Producers: Ian Kalushner, Adrienne Arsenault, Glen Kugelstadt, Michael Taylor-Noonan
- CBC News: Sunday Night – Canadian Broadcasting Corporation. Producers: Greg Kelly, Tania White, Eric Foss
- Studio 2 – (TVOntario). Producers: Elizabeth Payne, Ken Hillier, Paul Colbourne, Horst Mueller, Leora Eisen

== Best Newscast ==
- CTV National News – CTV Television Network. Producers: Wendy Freeman, Tom Haberstroh, David Hughes
- The National/CBC News – Canadian Broadcasting Corporation. Producers: Jonathan Whitten, Mark Harrison, Fred Parker, Lynn Kelly, Bob Waller
- Global National – Global National with Kevin Newman – Global News. Producers: George Browne, Doriana Temolo, Kevin Newman, Elaine McKay, Erin Lawrence

== Best News Special Event Coverage ==
- CBC News: RCMP Memorial – Canadian Broadcasting Corporation. Producers: Mark Bulgutch, Fred Parker
- The National/CBC News – Road to Recovery – Canadian Broadcasting Corporation. Producers: Jonathan Whitten, Fred Parker
- CBC News: Canada Votes – Election Night – Canadian Broadcasting Corporation. Producers: Mark Bulgutch, Fred Parker
- CBC News: Canada Votes – The 60th Anniversary Of D-Day – Canadian Broadcasting Corporation. Producers: Mark Bulgutch, Fred Parker
- CTV News – Death of a Pope – CTV Television Network. Producers: Kathleen O'Keefe, Tom Haberstroh, Brian LeBold, Joanne MacDonald

== Best Lifestyle/Practical Information Series ==
- Debbie Travis' Facelift – Whalley-Abbey Media. Producers: Debbie Travis, Hans Rosenstein
- Chef At Large – Ocean Entertainment. Producers: Johanna Eliot, Gretha Rose
- Design Inc. – Producers: Sarah Richardson, Michael Prini
- Holmes on Homes – General Purpose Entertainment. Producer: Scott Clark McNeil
- The Surreal Gourmet – Salad Daze Productions. Producers: Lon J. Hall, Dale Burshtein, Beth Fanjoy

== Best Lifestyle/Practical Information Segment ==
- Canada Now – Canadian Broadcasting Corporation. Producers: Conway Fraser, Ray Bourrier, Catherine McIsaac, David Donnelly, Lani Selick, Allison Crawford, Ron Sloan, Terry Stapleton, Barbara Brunzell, Neil Clarkson, Dale Foster
- Daily Planet – Discovery Channel. Producers: Kevin Mills, Mark Miller
- SexTV – Pink or Blue: The Science of Sex Selection – CHUM Television/Corus Entertainment. Producer: Cynthia Loyst
- ZeD – Pumpkin Boats – CBC. Producers: Ted McInnes, Alison Bruce, Scott MacEachern

== Best Animated Program or Series ==
- Dragon Booster – ApolloScreen Filmproduktion, Nerd Corps Entertainment, The Story Hat, Alliance Atlantis. Producers: Asaph Fipke, Ken Faier, Kevin Mowrer
- Atomic Betty – Atomic Cartoons, Breakthrough Entertainment, Tele Images Productions, Marathon Media. Producers: Steven Hecht, Virginia Jallot, Ira Levy, Nghia Nguyen, Kirsten Scollie, Peter Williamson, Kevin Gillis, Rob Davies, Philippe Alessandri, Trevor Bentley, Simone Harari
- Being Ian – Studio B Productions, Nelvana. Producers: Chris Bartleman, Kathy Antonsen Rocchio, Blair Peters
- Jacob Two-Two – Nelvana, Salter Street Films. Producers: Scott Dyer, Peter Moss, Patricia R. Burns, Jocelyn Hamilton, Doug Murphy
- Miss Spider's Sunny Patch Kids – Nelvana, Callaway Arts & Entertainment. Producers: Scott Dyer, Nicholas Callaway, Patricia R. Burns, David Kirk, Paul W. Robertson, Nadine van der Velde, Jocelyn Hamilton, Doug Murphy, Andy Russell

== Best Pre-School Program or Series ==
- Peep and the Big Wide World – WGBH-TV, 9 Story Media Group, TVOntario, Eggbox, Discovery Kids, National Film Board of Canada. Producers: Kate Taylor, Vince Commisso, Marisa Wolsky
- Poko – Poko II – Halifax Film Company. Producers: Michael Donovan, Charles Bishop, Jeff Rosen, Katrina Walsh, Cheryl Wagner
- Franny's Feet – Decode Entertainment, Family Channel, Channel 5. Producers: Steve Denure, Elana Adair, Neil Court, John Mariella, Beth Stevenson
- This is Daniel Cook – TVOntario, Treehouse TV, Marblemedia, Sinking Ship Entertainment. Producers: Matthew Bishop, Matthew Hornburg, J. J. Johnson, Blair Powers, Mark J.W. Bishop
- The Secret World of Benjamin Bear – Amberwood Entertainment, Philippine Animation Studio, Bell Fund. Producers: Sheldon S. Wiseman, Ken Anderson, Cherylyn Brooks, Mark Edwards

== Best Children's or Youth Fiction Program or Series ==
- Radio Free Roscoe – Decode Entertainment. Producers: Steve Denure, Neil Court, Brent Piaskoski, John Delmage, Doug McRobb, Will McRobb, Beth Stevenson
- 15/Love – Marathon Media. Producers: Jesse Fawcett, Derek Schreyer, Arnie Gelbart, Olivier Brémond, Karen Troubetzkoy, Pascal Breton, Leanna Crouch
- Fries with That? – YTV. Producers: Claudio Luca, Rosanne Cohen, Paul Risacher
- Fungus the Bogeyman – BBC, Galafilm, Indie Kids, Powercorp. Producers: Ian Whitehead, Dan Maddicott, Arnie Gelbart, Michael Haggiag.
- Instant Star – DHX Media. Producers: Linda Schuyler, Stephen Stohn

== Best Children's or Youth Non-Fiction Program or Series ==
- Street Cents – Canadian Broadcasting Corporation. Producers: Barbara Kennedy, Wendy Purves
- The View from Here – Angry Girls – TVOntario). Producers: Rudy Buttignol, Deborah Parks, Shelley Saywell
- My Brand New Life – National Film Board of Canada. Producers: Ina Fichman, Pierre Lapointe
- Mystery Hunters – Apartment 11 Productions. Producers: Jonathan Finkelstein, Jason Levy, Stacey Tenenbaum
- Nerve – Canadian Broadcasting Corporation. Producers: Ralph Benmergui, Andrea Gabourie

== Best Sports Program or Series ==
- Ben Johnson: Drugs and the Quest for Gold – Infinity Films. Producers: Shel Piercy, Ken Craw
- Life and Times – The Life and Times of Northern Dancer – Canadian Broadcasting Corporation. Producers: Halya Kuchmij, Linda Laughlin, Marie Natanson
- Making the Cut – Network Entertainment. Producers: Derik Murray, John Hamilton, Scott Moore
- Football First: The Roy Shivers Story – Canadian Broadcasting Corporation. Producers: Costa Maragos, Lori Kuffner
- Dave Bidini: The Hockey Nomad – Mercury Films. Producers: Mike Downie, Dave Bidini, Gordon Henderson

== Best Live Sporting Event ==
- 2005 Tim Hortons Brier – CBC Sports. Producer: Don Peppin
- CFL on TSN- Wendy's Friday Night Football: Montreal at Hamilton – TSN. Producers: Paul McLean, Jon Hynes
- The 2004 Stanley Cup Finals – Game Seven: Calgary vs Tampa – CBC Sports. Producers: Joel Darling, Chris Irwin, Sherali Najak

== Best Interactive ==
- Corner Gas www.cornergas.com. Producers: Virginia Thompson, David Storey, Brent Butt, Leif Kaldor (CTV Television Network, Prairie Pants Productions)
- renegadepress.com: renegadepress.com – Vérité Films. Producers: Gail Bryanton, Robert de Lint, Virginia Thompson
- Word Wizard – TVOntario. Producers: Jennifer Burkitt, Pat Ellingson
- Deafplanet: deafplanet.com – Marblemedia, Canadian Cultural Society of the Deaf. Producers: Mark J.W. Bishop, Matthew Hornburg
- ZeD – The New New Media – Canadian Broadcasting Corporation. Producers: Weston Triemstra, Tammy Everts

== Best Direction in a Dramatic Program or Mini-Series ==
- Chris Abraham – I, Claudia (CBC/Sienna Films)
- Don McBrearty – Chasing Freedom (Alberta Filmworks/Blueprint Entertainment)
- Pierre Gill – The Last Casino (Astral Films)
- David Yates – Sex Traffic – Part 1 (Big Motion Pictures)
- Stephen Surjik – Tripping the Wire: A Stephen Tree Mystery (Galafilm)

== Best Direction in a Dramatic Series ==
- David Wellington – The Eleventh Hour – Bumpy Cover (Alliance Atlantis)
- Steve DiMarco – The Eleventh Hour – In Spite of All the Damage (Alliance Atlantis)
- David Wellington – The Eleventh Hour – Eden (Alliance Atlantis)
- John L'Ecuyer – ReGenesis – Resurrection (The Movie Network/Movie Central/Shaftesbury Films)
- Gary Harvey – Cold Squad – And the Fury (Keatley MacLeod Productions/Alliance Atlantis)

== Best Direction in a News Information Program or Series ==
- Oleh Rumak – the fifth estate – Do You Believe in Miracles? (CBC)
- Claude Vickery – the fifth estate – The Girl in the Suitcase (CBC)
- Kit Melamed – the fifth estate – Mister Nobody (CBC)
- Morris Karp – the fifth estate – Sticks and Stones (CBC)
- Marie Caloz – the fifth estate – First, Do No Harm (CBC)

== Best Direction in a Documentary Program ==
- Kevin McMahon – Stolen Spirits of Haida Gwaii (Primitive Entertainment)
- John Kastner – Rage Against the Darkness (J.S. Kastner Productions)
- Craig Chivers – No Place Called Home (NFB)
- Avi Lewis – The Take (Barna-Alper Productions/CBC/NFB/Klein Lewis Productions)
- David Vaisbord – Drawing Out The Demons: A Film about the Artist Attila Richard Lukacs (Screen Siren Pictures)
- Peter Raymont – Shake Hands with the Devil: The Journey of Roméo Dallaire (White Pine Pictures/CBC)

== Best Direction in a Documentary Series ==
- John Zaritsky – College Days, College Nights: Between Past and Present Tense (Point Grey Pictures)
- Karen Shopsowitz – Canada's War in Colour (Yap Films)
- Jackie May – Life's Little Miracles – Home for the Holidays (Slice/CBC)
- Rina Barone – Opening Soon – Milford Bistro (Red Apple Entertainment)
- Carol Moore-Ede – The Nature of Things – Sex Lies and Secrecy: Dissecting Hysterectomy (CBC)

== Best Direction in a Comedy Program or Series ==
- Patrice Sauvé – Ciao Bella – To Forgive Is To Insult (Cirrus Communications)
- Deborah Day – Getting Along Famously (Canadian Accents)
- Henry Sarwer-Foner – Hatching, Matching and Dispatching (CBC)
- Mike Clattenburg – Trailer Park Boys – Working Man (Showcase/Topsail Entertainment)
- Shawn Thompson – Puppets Who Kill – Cuddles the Manchurian Candidate (Eggplant Picture & Sound)

== Best Direction in a Variety Program or Series ==
- Mario Rouleau – Cirque du Soleil: Midnight Sun (Arte/Amérimage-Spectra/Bravo!/CBC/Conte IV/Echo Media/ZDFtheaterkanal)
- Shelagh O'Brien – East Coast Music Awards (East Coast Music Association/CBC Halifax)
- Joan Tosoni – Juno Awards of 2005 (Canadian Academy of Recording Arts and Sciences/CTV)
- Shelagh O'Brien – The Chieftains in Canada (CBC)
- Joan Tosoni – The Greatest Canadian – Final Showdown (CBC)

== Best Direction in a Performing Arts Program or Series ==
- Larry Weinstein – Beethoven's Hair (BBC/CBC/Dor Film/Rhombus Media/Telefilm Canada/Xenophile Media)
- Byron McKim – Quest (Soaring Heart Pictures)
- Veronica Tennant – A Pairing of Swans (Marblemedia/CBC)
- Rosemary House – Bloomsday Cabaret (Rock Island Productions)
- Pierre Séguin – Nomade: At Night, the Sky is Endless (Cirque Éloize)

== Best Direction in a Lifestyle/Practical Information Program or Series ==
- Henry Less – Made to Order (Mercer St. Films)
- David Hansen – English Teachers III (WestWind Pictures)
- Tracie Tighe – Venture – The Big Switcheroo – FedEx, Part 1 (CBC)
- Mary Lynk – Body of Knowledge (CBC)
- Linda McEwan – Real Renos (Smashing Pictures)
- Romano D'Andrea – Style By Jury (Planetworks)

== Best Direction in a Children's or Youth Program or Series ==
- Graeme Campbell – Instant Star – You Can't Always Get What You Want (DHX Media)
- Mauro Casalese, Jeffrey Agala, Ridd Sorensen – Atomic Betty – Atomic Roger, Toxic Talent (Atomic Cartoons/Breakthrough Entertainment/Tele Images Productions/Marathon Media)
- Robert de Lint – renegadepress.com – Dying to Connect (Vérité Films)
- Richard Mortimer, Sid Goldberg, Robert Higden – Surprise! It's Edible Incredible! – Matthew and Jordan (Apartment 11 Productions)
- J. J. Johnson – This is Daniel Cook – This is Daniel Cook Doing Magic (TVOntario/Treehouse TV/Marblemedia/Sinking Ship Entertainment)

== Best Direction in a Live Sporting Event ==
- Ron Forsythe – CFL on CBC – 2004 West Division Championship (CBC Sports)
- Paul Hemming – CFL on CBC : Wendy's Friday Night Football – Montreal at Hamilton (CBC Sports)
- Paul Hemming – 2005 World Junior Ice Hockey Championships – Gold Medal Game (TSN)
- Troy Clara – 2004 Memorial Cup – Final Game (Rogers Sportsnet)

== Best Writing in a Dramatic Program or Mini-Series ==
- Alan Di Fiore, Chris Haddock – The Life (CTV/Haddock Entertainment/Odd Man Out Productions/Sarrazin Couture Entertainment)
- Paul Gross, John Krizanc – H2O – Night 1 (Whizbang Films)
- Abi Morgan – Sex Traffic – Part 1 (Big Motion Pictures)
- John Goldsmith, John Kent Harrison – A Bear Named Winnie (Original Pictures, Powercorp)
- Barbara Samuels – Chasing Freedom (Alberta Filmworks/Blueprint Entertainment)

== Best Writing in a Dramatic Series ==
- Semi Chellas, Tassie Cameron – The Eleventh Hour – Bumpy Cover (Alliance Atlantis)
- Tassie Cameron – The Eleventh Hour – Hit Delete (Alliance Atlantis)
- Chris Haddock, Sylvia Leung, Jesse McKeown – Da Vinci’s Inquest – Must Be a Night For Fires (Haddock Entertainment/Barna-Alper Productions/Alliance Atlantis/CBC)
- Dani Romain, George F. Walker – This Is Wonderland – Episode 2.11 (Muse Entertainment/Indian Grove Productions)
- Jason Sherman – ReGenesis – Spare Parts (The Movie Network/Movie Central/Shaftesbury Films)
- Martin Gero – Stargate Atlantis – The Brotherhood (Acme Shark Productions/Sony Pictures Television)

== Best Writing in a Comedy or Variety Program or Series ==
- Ken Finkleman – The Newsroom – Baghdad Bound (100% Film and Television/CBC/Showcase, Telefilm Canada)
- Kevin White, Irwin Barker, Gavin Crawford, Mark Critch, Barry Julien, Gary Pearson, Jennifer Whalen – This Hour Has 22 Minutes – Episode 12.12 (Alliance Atlantis/CBC)
- Colin Mochrie – Getting Along Famously (Canadian Accents)
- Mary Walsh, Ed Macdonald – Hatching, Matching and Dispatching (CBC)
- Mike Clattenburg, Barrie Dunn, Robb Wells, John Paul Tremblay, Jonathan Torrens, Michael A Volpe, Mike Smith, Iain Macleod – Trailer Park Boys Christmas Special (Showcase/Topsail Entertainment)

== Best Writing in an Information Program or Series ==
- Linden MacIntyre – the fifth estate – War Without Borders (CBC)
- Victor Malarek, Margo Harper – W5 – Town Without Pity (CTV)
- Bob McKeown – the fifth estate – Sticks and Stones (CBC)
- Hana Gartner – the fifth estate – The Canadian (CBC)
- Carol Off – The National/CBC News – Of Beauty Queens and Fatwas (CBC)

== Best Writing in a Documentary Program or Series ==
- Thomas Wallner – Beethoven's Hair (BBC/CBC/Dor Film/Rhombus Media/Telefilm Canada/Xenophile Media)
- Steve Markle – Camp Hollywood (Hirsh Markle Films)
- Terence McKenna – The National/CBC News – Bribes From Baghdad (CBC)
- Peter Chappell, Arnie Gelbart, Stéphane Horel – The Origins of AIDS (Canadian Broadcasting Corporation, Galafilm, Channel Four Television Corporation, Frame 2, Les Films de la Passerelle, Multimédia France Productions, Produce+, Radio Télévision Belge Francophone, Pathé Archives)
- Susan Martin – Runaway Grooms (Asli Films)

== Best Writing in a Children's or Youth's Program or Series ==
- Derek Schreyer – 15/Love – Renewal (Marathon Media)
- Heather Conkie, Jana Sinyor – Dark Oracle (Cookie Jar Entertainment/Shaftesbury Films)
- Mary Crawford, Alan Templeton – King – Stolen Voices (Decode Entertainment/Funbag Animation Studios)
- Barry Julien, David Acer, Ramelle Mair – Mystery Hunters – Anastasia, Anna Anderson (Apartment 11 Productions)
- Jordan Wheeler – renegadepress.com – Dying to Connect (Vérité Films)

== Best Performance by an Actor in a Leading Role in a Dramatic Program or Mini-Series ==
- Brendan Fletcher – The Death and Life of Nancy Eaton (Muse Entertainment/Indian Grove Productions/Studio Eight Productions/Voice Pictures)
- Chris Diamantopoulos – Behind the Camera: The Unauthorized Story of Mork & Mindy (NBC Studios/Nomadic Pictures/Once Upon a Time Films)
- Jonathan Scarfe – Burn: The Robert Wraight Story (Alberta Filmworks/CTV/Monkeywrench Productions/Tapestry Pictures)
- Charles Martin Smith – The Last Casino (Astral Films)
- John Simm – Sex Traffic – Part 1 (Big Motion Pictures)

== Best Performance by an Actress in a Leading Role in a Dramatic Program or Mini-Series ==
- Kristen Thomson – I, Claudia (CBC, Sienna Films)
- Tina Keeper – Distant Drumming (Seven24 Films)
- Wendy Crewson – Sex Traffic – Part 1 (Big Motion Pictures)
- Anamaria Marinca – Sex Traffic – Part 1 (Big Motion Pictures)
- Alisen Down – The Life (CTV/Haddock Entertainment/Odd Man Out Productions/Sarrazin Couture Entertainment)

== Best Performance by an Actor in a Continuing Leading Dramatic Role ==
- Michael Riley – This Is Wonderland – Episode 2.13 (Muse Entertainment/Indian Grove Productions)
- Nicholas Campbell – Da Vinci’s Inquest – Mr. Ellis Himself Woulda Been Proud (Haddock Entertainment/Barna-Alper Productions/Alliance Atlantis/CBC)
- Jeff Seymour – The Eleventh Hour – In Spite of All the Damage (Alliance Atlantis)
- Ben Bass – The Eleventh Hour – Eden (Alliance Atlantis)
- Peter Outerbridge – ReGenesis – Baby Bomb (The Movie Network/Movie Central/Shaftesbury Films)

== Best Performance by an Actress in a Continuing Leading Dramatic Role ==
- Cara Pifko – This Is Wonderland – Episode 2.12 (Muse Entertainment/Indian Grove Productions)
- Waneta Storms – The Eleventh Hour – Hit Delete (Alliance Atlantis)
- Julie Stewart – Cold Squad – And the Fury (Keatley MacLeod Productions/Alliance Atlantis)
- Victoria Snow – Paradise Falls – Old Friends (Breakthrough Entertainment)
- Tammy Isbell – Paradise Falls – What's the Hold Up? (Breakthrough Entertainment)

== Best Performance by an Actor in a Guest Role Dramatic Series ==
- Henry Czerny – The Eleventh Hour – Zugzwang (Alliance Atlantis)
- Shawn Doyle – The Eleventh Hour – Bumpy Cover (Alliance Atlantis)
- Luke Kirby – The Eleventh Hour – Hit Delete (Alliance Atlantis)
- David Cubitt – The Eleventh Hour – The Miracle Worker (Alliance Atlantis)
- Bernard Behrens – This Is Wonderland – Episode 2.07 (Muse Entertainment/Indian Grove Productions)

== Best Performance by an Actress in a Guest Role Dramatic Series ==
- Kristin Booth – ReGenesis – Spare Parts (The Movie Network/Movie Central/Shaftesbury Films)
- Lolita Davidovich – The Eleventh Hour – Pot Kettle Black (Alliance Atlantis)
- Fiona Reid – This Is Wonderland – Episode 2.10 (Muse Entertainment/Indian Grove Productions)
- Dawn Greenhalgh – This Is Wonderland – Episode 2.06 (Muse Entertainment/Indian Grove Productions)
- Ann Holloway – This Is Wonderland – Episode 2.12 (Muse Entertainment/Indian Grove Productions)
- Diana Pavlovská – The Collector – The Historian (No Equal Entertainment)

== Best Performance by an Actor in a Featured Supporting Role in a Dramatic Series ==
- Michael Murphy – This Is Wonderland – Episode 2.02 (Muse Entertainment/Indian Grove Productions)
- Michael Healey – This Is Wonderland – Episode 2.07 (Muse Entertainment/Indian Grove Productions)
- Tom Rooney – This Is Wonderland – Episode 2.08 (Muse Entertainment/Indian Grove Productions)
- Noel Fisher – Godiva's – Masters of Delusion (Keatley Entertainment/CHUM)
- Dmitry Chepovetsky – ReGenesis – The Promise (The Movie Network/Movie Central/Shaftesbury Films)

== Best Performance by an Actress in a Featured Supporting Role in a Dramatic Series ==
- Ellen Page – ReGenesis – Black Out (The Movie Network/Movie Central/Shaftesbury Films)
- Catherine Fitch – This Is Wonderland – Episode 2.08 (Muse Entertainment/Indian Grove Productions)
- Sonja Bennett – Cold Squad – Righteous (Keatley MacLeod Productions/Alliance Atlantis)
- Ellen Dubin – The Collector – The Campaign Manager (No Equal Entertainment)
- Kate Trotter – Paradise Falls – The Dark Side (Breakthrough Entertainment)

== Best Performance by an Actor in a Featured Supporting Role in a Dramatic Program or Mini-Series ==
- Richard Zeppieri – Murdoch Mysteries: Except the Dying (Shaftesbury Films)
- Chris Potter – Sex Traffic – Part 1 (Big Motion Pictures)
- Luke Kirby – Sex Traffic – Part 1 (Big Motion Pictures)
- Stefan Arngrim – The Life (CTV/Haddock Entertainment/Odd Man Out Productions/Sarrazin Couture Entertainment)
- Jean-Pierre Bergeron – Prom Queen: The Marc Hall Story (Screen Door)

== Best Performance by an Actress in a Featured Supporting Role in a Dramatic Program or Mini-Series ==
- Maria Popistasu – Sex Traffic – Part 1 (Big Motion Pictures)
- Martha Henry – H2O – Night 1 (Whizbang Films)
- Miranda Handford – Tripping the Wire: A Stephen Tree Mystery (Galafilm)
- Layla Alizada – Chasing Freedom (Alberta Filmworks/Blueprint Entertainment)
- Alberta Watson – Choice: The Henry Morgentaler Story (Choice Films)

== Best Individual Performance in a Comedy Program or Series ==
- Mary Walsh – Hatching, Matching and Dispatching (CBC)
- Levi MacDougall – Comedy Now! – Levi MacDougall (CTV/Hi Guys Ten Productions)
- Irwin Barker – Halifax Comedy Festival (CBC Television)
- Lewis Black – Just for Laughs (Just for Laughs Comedy Festival/Les Films Rozon)
- Colin Fox – Puppets Who Kill – Buttons the Dresser (Eggplant Picture & Sound)

== Best Ensemble Performance in a Comedy Program or Series ==
- Cory Bowles, Robb Wells, John Paul Tremblay, Jonathan Torrens, Lucy Decoutere, Barrie Dunn, John Dunsworth, Jeanna Harrison, Sarah Dunsworth-Nickerson, Tyrone Parsons, Patrick Roach, Mike Smith, Shelley Thompson, Michael Jackson, Garry James – Trailer Park Boys – Working Man (Showcase/Topsail Entertainment)
- Rick Green, Ron Pardo, Janet van de Graaf, Bob Bainborough, Teresa Pavlinek – History Bites – Elizabeth & Mary: Queen Takes Queen, Checkmate (The History Channel)
- Gord Robertson, James Rankin, Bob Martin, Dan Redican, Bruce Hunter – Puppets Who Kill – Buttons on a Hot Tin Roof (Eggplant Picture & Sound)
- Martin Huisman, Louis Philippe Dandenault, Richard Jutras, Annie Bovaird, Paula Boudreau, Alain Goulem, Tracey Hoyt, Kate Greenhouse, Ryan Tilson, Christian Potenza, Cas Anvar, Victor Chowdhury, Dean McDermott, Swikriti Sarkar – The Tournament – Saturday at the Tournament (Adjacent 2 Entertainment/CBC)
- Cathy Jones, Shaun Majumder, Gavin Crawford, Mark Critch – This Hour Has 22 Minutes – Episode 12.12 (Alliance Atlantis/CBC)

== Best Performance or Host in a Variety Program or Series ==
- Jon Pilatzke, Nathan Pilatzke – The Chieftains in Canada (CBC)
- Jamie Cullum – Live at the Rehearsal Hall (Bravo!)
- Alexander Sevastian, Jacques Wood-Eloi, Anne Plamondon, Kristina Reiko Cooper, Cynthia Steljes, Kinga Mitrowska, Peter de Sotto – Canada Day 2004: Merci Montréal (CBC)
- Alex Lifeson, Mike Smith, Neil Peart, Geddy Lee, Ed Robertson – Canada for Asia (CBC)
- Archie Alleyne, Russ Little, Doug Richardson, Alexis Baro, Ronald Johnston, Michael Shand, Frank Wright – Makin' Noise for Salome (CBC)

== Best Performance in a Performing Arts Program or Series ==
- Robert Sokolowski, Josianne Levasseur, Karin Delzors, Pierre-Alexandre Dion, Ewelina Fijolek, Yamoussa Bangoura, Lena Reis, Langis Turcotte, Suzanne Soler, Bartlomiej Soroczynski, Andrzej Sokolowski, Josianne Laporte, Stefan Johannes Wepfer, Sonia Painchaud, Éric Saintonge, Guillaume Saladin – Nomade: At Night, the Sky is Endless (Cirque Éloize)
- George Gao, Sarah Slean – 2004 Governor General's Performing Arts Awards (CBC)
- Evelyn Hart, Rex Harrington – A Pairing of Swans (Marblemedia/CBC)
- Byron Chief-Moon – Quest (Soaring Heart Pictures)

== Best Performance in a Children's or Youth Program or Series ==
- Ksenia Solo – renegadepress.com – Can You See Me Now (Vérité Films)
- Laurence Leboeuf – 15/Love – Ghost of a Chance (Marathon Media)
- Alexz Johnson – Instant Star – Won't Get Fooled Again (DHX Media)
- Tasha Pelletier – renegadepress.com – Union (Vérité Films)
- Tatiana Maslany – renegadepress.com – Giving Yourself Away (Vérité Films)
- Daniel Cook – This is Daniel Cook – This is Daniel Cook Doing Magic (TVOntario/Treehouse TV/Marblemedia/Sinking Ship Entertainment)

== Best News Anchor ==
- Kevin Newman – Global National (Global)
- Lloyd Robertson – CTV National News (CTV)
- Peter Mansbridge – The National/CBC News (CBC)

== Best Reportage ==
- David Akin – CTV National News – CityNews at Six (CTV)
- Adrienne Arsenault – The National/CBC News (CBC)
- David Common – The National/CBC News (CBC)
- Lisa LaFlamme – CTV National News – Mayerthorpe RCMP Murders (CTV)
- Janis Mackey Frayer – CTV National News – CityNews at Six (CTV)

== Best Host or Interviewer in a News Information Program or Series ==
- Wendy Mesley – Marketplace – Heart of the Matter, Buying Into Sexy (CBC)
- Bob McKeown – the fifth estate – Bio of Dick Cheney, Do You Believe in Miracles?, Sticks and Stones (CBC)
- Gillian Findlay – the fifth estate – First, Do No Harm (CBC)
- Seamus O'Regan – Canada AM – Aug 06, 2004, Apr 26, 2005, Mar 7, 2005 (CTV)
- Carole MacNeil – CBC News: Sunday (CBC)

== Best Host or Interviewer in a Lifestyle/General Interest or Talk Program or Series ==
- Evan Solomon – Hot Type (CBC Newsworld)
- Avery Haines – Health on the Line (HOTL Productions)
- Evan Solomon – CBC News: Sunday Night (CBC)
- Mary Walsh – The Greatest Canadian – The Great Frederick Banting (CBC)
- Jay Ingram – Daily Planet – Tsunami Special (Discovery Channel)

== Best Host in a Lifestyle/Practical Information, or Performing Arts Program or Series ==
- Kevin Brauch – The Thirsty Traveler – Absinthe (Grasslands Entertainment)
- Marilyn Denis – CityLine (Citytv)
- Mike Holmes – Holmes on Homes (General Purpose Entertainment)
- Gregory Charles – 2004 Governor General's Performing Arts Awards (CBC)
- Candice Olson – Divine Design (Fusion Television)

== Best Host or Interviewer in a Sports Program or Sportscast ==
- Scott Russell – CBC Sports Saturday (CBC Sports)
- Tom Harrington – The National/CBC News – Sports Journal: Olympic Standards/Sports Psychologist (CBC)
- James Duthie – Canada's Game: Hockey Lives Here (TSN)
- Darren Dreger – 2004 Playoff Edition: Theoren Fleury (TSN)
- Deborah Grey – The Greatest Canadian – The Great Wayne Gretzky (CBC)

== Best Sports Play-by-Play or Analyst ==
- Byron MacDonald, Steve Armitage – Athens 2004: The Olympic Games Aquatics Coverage
- Glen Suitor – CFL on TSN- Wendy's Friday Night Football: Montreal at Hamilton (TSN)
- Bob Cole, Harry Neale – The 2004 Stanley Cup Finals – Game Six: Calgary vs Tampa (CBC)

== Best Photography in a Dramatic Program or Series ==
- Bernard Couture – The Last Casino (Astral Films)
- Chris Seager – Sex Traffic – Part 1 (Big Motion Pictures)
- David Frazee – The Life (CTV/Haddock Entertainment/Odd Man Out Productions/Sarrazin Couture Entertainment)
- Jean Lépine – A Bear Named Winnie (Original Pictures, Powercorp)
- Norayr Kasper – The Death and Life of Nancy Eaton (Muse Entertainment/Indian Grove Productions/Studio Eight Productions/Voice Pictures)

== Best Photography in a Comedy, Variety, Performing Arts Program or Series ==
- Rick McVicar – Puppets Who Kill – Cuddles the Manchurian Candidate (Eggplant Picture & Sound)
- Christopher J. Romeike – Opening Night – The Four Seasons Mosaic (CBC)
- Horst Zeidler – Beethoven's Hair (BBC/CBC/Dor Film/Rhombus Media/Telefilm Canada/Xenophile Media)
- Réal Truchon – Canada Day 2004: Merci Montréal (CBC)
- Jean-Pierre St-Louis – Naked Josh – Celibacy (Sextant Productions/Cirrus Communications)
- Steve Cosens – Show Me Yours, Chapter One (Barna-Alper Productions/IYD Productions)

== Best Photography in an Information Program or Series ==
- Ian Hannah – Past Life Investigation (CBC)
- Paul Seeler – the fifth estate – First, Do No Harm (CBC)
- Jim Nilson – CBC News: Country Canada – Legacy (CBC)
- Richard Agecoutay – No Glory (CBC)
- Aldo Columpsi, Ted Hilbig – Football First: The Roy Shivers Story (CBC)

== Best Photography in a Documentary Program or Series ==
- Derek Rogers – The Nature of Things – Shipbreakers (CBC)
- Douglas Pike, John Westheuser – Rage Against the Darkness (J.S. Kastner Productions)
- Christopher Ball, Robert MacDonald – Diet of Souls (Triad Film Productions)
- Jay Ferguson – Animals
- John Westheuser – Shake Hands with the Devil: The Journey of Roméo Dallaire (White Pine Pictures/CBC)

== Best Visual Effects ==
- Michelle Comens, Tom Brydon, Jose Burgos, John Gajdecki, Dan Mayer, Jinnie Pak, Wes Sargent, Bruce Woloshyn – Stargate Atlantis – Rising (Acme Shark Productions/Sony Pictures Television)
- Paul Furminger, Abel Milanes – The Collector – The Historian (No Equal Entertainment)
- Michelle Comens, Simon Ager, Jose Burgos, Geoff Anderson, Dan Mayer, Mark Breakspear, Tara Conley, Bruce Woloshyn, Tristam Gieni, Todd Liddiard – Stargate Atlantis – The Eye (Acme Shark Productions/Sony Pictures Television)
- Michelle Comens, James Halverson, Brett Keyes, Krista McLean, Bradley Mullennix, James Rorick, Craig Van Den Biggelaar, Karen Watson – Stargate SG-1 – New Order, Part 2 (Stargate SG-1 Productions)
- James Tichenor, Chris Doll, Shannon Gurney, James Halverson, Krista McLean, Craig Van Den Biggelaar, Karen Watson, Bruce Woloshyn – Stargate SG-1 – Lost City, Part 2 (Stargate SG-1 Productions)
- Steven Hodgson, Rosemary Conte – The Collector – The Historian (No Equal Entertainment)

== Best Picture Editing in a Dramatic Program or Series ==
- Sylvain Lebel – The Last Casino (Astral Films)
- Tom Joerin – ReGenesis – Spare Parts (The Movie Network/Movie Central/Shaftesbury Films)
- Mark Day – Sex Traffic – Part 1 (Big Motion Pictures)
- Mike Lee – Prom Queen: The Marc Hall Story (Screen Door)
- Ron Wisman – A Bear Named Winnie (Original Pictures/Powercorp)

== Best Picture Editing in a Comedy, Variety, Performing Arts Program or Series ==
- Stéphanie Grégoire, Gareth C. Scales – The Tournament (Adjacent 2 Entertainment/CBC)
- Cathy Gulkin, Jeff Bessner – Opening Night – The Four Seasons Mosaic (CBC)
- Peter Steel, Jessica McKee – ZeD – Art and Soul (CBC)
- David New – Beethoven's Hair (BBC/CBC/Dor Film/Rhombus Media/Telefilm Canada/Xenophile Media)
- Ken Gray, Tharanga Ramanayake – Freedom – RUBBERBAND (Sound Venture International)

== Best Picture Editing in an Information Program or Series ==
- Loretta Hicks – the fifth estate – Sticks and Stones (CBC)
- Leslie Steven Onody – the fifth estate – War Without Borders (CBC)
- Claude Panet-Raymond – the fifth estate – Do You Believe in Miracles? (CBC)
- Gil Tétreault – CBC News: Country Canada – Shoot, Shovel & Shut Up (CBC)
- Michael Hannan – Past Life Investigation (CBC)

== Best Picture Editing in a Documentary Program or Series ==
- Michèle Hozer – Shake Hands with the Devil: The Journey of Roméo Dallaire (White Pine Pictures/CBC)
- Ricardo Acosta – The Take (Barna-Alper Productions/CBC/NFB/Klein Lewis Productions)
- Jim Goertzen – The Greatest Canadian – The Great Tommy Douglas (CBC)
- Lawrence Jackman – Animals
- Deborah Palloway – The Nature of Things – Shipbreakers (CBC)

== Best Production Design or Art Direction in a Dramatic Program or Series ==
- Candida Otton – Sex Traffic – Part 1 (Big Motion Pictures)
- Jean-François Campeau – The Last Casino (Astral Films)
- Philip Schmidt – Behind the Camera: The Unauthorized Story of Mork & Mindy (NBC Studios/Nomadic Pictures/Once Upon a Time Films)
- Kathleen Climie – Dark Oracle – Recruitment (Cookie Jar Entertainment/Shaftesbury Films)
- Ron Stefaniuk, Pamela Mingo – The Doodlebops – Growing Moe (Cookie Jar Entertainment)

== Best Production Design or Art Direction in a Non-Dramatic Program or Series ==
- Peter Faragher – Juno Awards of 2005 (Canadian Academy of Recording Arts and Sciences/CTV)
- Callum MacLachlan – 2004 MuchMusic Video Awards (MuchMusic)
- Jean Babin – Ciao Bella – Magic (Cirrus Communications)
- Sherri Hay – The Surreal Gourmet (Salad Daze Productions)
- Guy Lalande – The Tournament (Adjacent 2 Entertainment/CBC)

== Best Costume Design ==
- Anushia Nieradzik – Sex Traffic – Part 1 (Big Motion Pictures)
- Michael Harris – H2O – Night 1 (Whizbang Films)
- Siobhan Gray – The Life (CTV/Haddock Entertainment/Odd Man Out Productions/Sarrazin Couture Entertainment)
- Madeleine Stewart – Murdoch Mysteries: Except the Dying (Shaftesbury Films)
- Nicoletta Massone – Choice: The Henry Morgentaler Story (Choice Films)

== Best Achievement in Make-Up ==
- Marilyn O’Quinn – The Eleventh Hour – Zugzwang (Alliance Atlantis)
- Beverley Keigher – The Life (CTV/Haddock Entertainment/Odd Man Out Productions/Sarrazin Couture Entertainment)
- Samantha Rumball – Chasing Freedom (Alberta Filmworks/Blueprint Entertainment)
- Djina Caron – Ciao Bella – Magic (Cirrus Communications)
- Todd Masters, Leah Ehman – Stargate Atlantis – Before I Sleep (Acme Shark Productions/Sony Pictures Television)

== Best Sound in a Dramatic Program ==
- John Laing, Todd Beckett, Robert Bertola, Keith Elliott, Mark Gingras, Tim O’Connell, Jill Purdy, John J. Thomson, Mark Zsifkovits – Lives of the Saints (Capri Films/PowerCorp/RTI)
- Leon Johnson, Jean-Raphaël Dedieu, Don Dickson, Peter Hodges, Virginia Storey, Mark Wright – A Bear Named Winnie (Original Pictures, Powercorp)
- Sylvain Arseneault, Kathy Choi, Sue Conley, Barry Gilmore, Steve Hammond, Ronayne Higginson, Janice Ierulli, Garrett Kerr, Martin Lee, David McCallum, Ian Rankin, Mark Shnuriwsky, Jane Tattersall, Robert Warchol – H2O (Whizbang Films)
- Kathy Choi, Barry Gilmore, Steve Hammond, Ronayne Higginson, Janice Ierulli, Garrett Kerr, Stephan Carrier, David McCallum, Lou Solakofski, Mark Shnuriwsky, Jane Tattersall, Robert Warchol, Rod Deogrades, Simon Okin, Jane Porter – Sex Traffic – Part 1 (Big Motion Pictures)
- Patrick Haskill, Brad Hillman, Stan Iwanchuk from Winnipeg, Nicole Thompson, James Kusan, Miguel Nunes, John R.S. Taylor – The Life (CTV/Haddock Entertainment/Odd Man Out Productions/Sarrazin Couture Entertainment)

== Best Sound in a Dramatic Series ==
- Kelly Cole, Rick Bal, Jacqueline Cristianini, Mike Olekshy, Joe Spivak – Cold Squad – And the Fury (Keatley MacLeod Productions/Alliance Atlantis)
- Brad Hillman, Patrick Haskill, Miguel Nunes, John R.S. Taylor, Nicole Thompson, William Skinner – Da Vinci’s Inquest – Before They Twist The Knife (Haddock Entertainment/Barna-Alper Productions/Alliance Atlantis/CBC)
- Justin Drury, Ric Jurgens – Radio Free Roscoe – There Will Be No Encore Tonight (Decode Entertainment)
- Warren St. Onge, Rob Bryanton, Jeff Hamon, Larry McCormick, Evan Rust – renegadepress.com – Dying to Connect (Vérité Films)
- Mark Hensley, Stephen Cheung, Ian Emberton, Craig Stauffer, Greg Stewart – The Collector – The Historian (No Equal Entertainment)

== Best Sound in a Comedy, Variety, or Performing Arts Program or Series ==
- Joe Knauer, Jane Tattersall, David Rose, David McCallum, Sanjay Mehta, Martin Lee, Steve Hammond, Lou Solakofski, Brent Pickett, Ronayne Higginson, Jiri Slanina – Beethoven's Hair (BBC/CBC/Dor Film/Rhombus Media/Telefilm Canada/Xenophile Media)
- Joe Petrella, Jeff Wolpert – The Language of Love
- Ron Searles, Danny Greenspoon – The Magical Gathering (CBC)
- Philippe Scultéty, Peter Lopata, Roger Guérin, Stan Sakellaropoulos, Tony Jackson – Fungus the Bogeyman – Episode 2 (BBC/Galafilm/Indie Kids/Powercorp)
- Ian Dunbar, Doug McClement, Howard Baggley, Marc Laliberté, Simon Bowers, Michael Molineux, Peter Campbell – Juno Awards of 2005 (Canadian Academy of Recording Arts and Sciences/CTV)

== Best Sound in an Information/Documentary Program or Series ==
- Chris McIntosh, Brent Marchenski, Alexander Hall – Making the Cut, Episode 12 (Network Entertainment)
- Jeremy Short, Chris Cobain, John Clarke – Life and Times – Ashley MacIssac: Me, Myself and The Devil (CBC)
- Jakob Thiesen, Daniel Pellerin, Russell Walker, Alan Geldart, Ao Loo – Shake Hands with the Devil: The Journey of Roméo Dallaire (White Pine Pictures/CBC)
- Brian Schwarz, Dwayne Newman, Daniel Pellerin, Jason Milligan, Geoff Raffan – The Take (Barna-Alper Productions/CBC/NFB/Klein Lewis Productions)
- Kevin Tokar, Philip Strong – Continuous Journey (Peripheral Visions)
- France Leduc, Nicholas Gagnon, Fredéric Cloutier, Bernard Gariépy Strobl – Be the Creature – Expedition Orangutan Decode Entertainment/Kratt Brothers Company)

== Best Original Music Score for a Program or Mini-Series ==
- Amin Bhatia – In The Dark (Megalomania Films)
- Jonathan Goldsmith – Chasing Freedom (Alberta Filmworks/Blueprint Entertainment)
- Armando Trovajoli – Lives of the Saints (Capri Films/PowerCorp/RTI)
- Schaun Tozer – The Life (CTV/Haddock Entertainment/Odd Man Out Productions/Sarrazin Couture Entertainment)
- Robert Carli – Murdoch Mysteries: Except the Dying (Shaftesbury Films)

== Best Original Music Score for a Dramatic Series ==
- Gary Koftinoff – Dark Oracle (Cookie Jar Entertainment/Shaftesbury Films)
- Luc Sicard – Ciao Bella – Catherine The Great (Cirrus Communications)
- Colin Towns – Fungus the Bogeyman – Episode 1 (BBC/Galafilm/Indie Kids/Powercorp)
- James Jandrisch – Show Me Yours, The Following Game (Barna-Alper Productions/IYD Productions)
- Carl Lenox – The Doodlebops – ABRACADEEDEE (Cookie Jar Entertainment)

== Best Original Music Score for a Documentary Program or Series ==
- Murray C. Anderson, Warrick Sony – Life and Times – Madiba: The Life & Times of Nelson Mandela (CBC)
- Philip Strong, Kiran Ahluwalia, Ben Grossman, Shahid Ali Khan, Mark Korven, Ravi Naimpally – Continuous Journey (Peripheral Visions)
- Mark Korven – Winning
- Daniel Toussaint – Miracle Planet – The Violent Past (NHK/NFB)
- Christian Clermont, Claude Castonguay, Marc Ouellette – Mystery Hunters – Anastasia, Anna Anderson (Apartment 11 Productions)

== Best Original Music Score for an Animated Program or Series ==
- Amin Bhatia, Ari Posner – King – Stolen Voices (Decode Entertainment/Funbag Animation Studios)
- Amin Bhatia, Meiro Stamm – Franny's Feet – You Bug Me, Double Trouble – Decode Entertainment/Family Channel/Channel 5)
- Jeff Danna – Miss Spider's Sunny Patch Kids – Humbug, Dashing Through the Snow (Nelvana, Callaway Arts & Entertainment)
- Ian Thomas – Care Bears – Journey to Joke-a-Lot (DIC Entertainment)
- Serge Côté – Kevin Spencer – The Buck Stops Here (Atomic Productions)

== Special awards ==
- Gordon Sinclair Award for Broadcast Journalism – David Halton
- Earle Grey Award – Steve Smith
- Academy Achievement Award – David Greene
- Canada Award: Tasha Hubbard, Bonnie Thompson – Two Worlds Colliding
- Gemini Humanitarian Award – Roger Abbott, Luba Goy, Don Ferguson – Air Farce Live
- Viewer's Choice Award for Lifestyle Host: Marilyn Denis, CityLine
- Gemini Award for Most Popular Website Competition: Sandy Yang, Wendy Smith, Noelle Paredes – Canadian Idol – idol.ctv.ca
