= 15th Gemini Awards =

2000 awards for Canadian television

- Date: October 30, 2000
- Venue: John Bassett Theatre, Toronto
- Hosted by: Steve Smith

Television/radio coverage
- Network: CBC Television

The Academy of Canadian Cinema & Television's 15th Gemini Awards were held on October 30, 2000, to honour achievements in Canadian television. The awards show, which was hosted by Steve Smith, took place at the John Bassett Theatre and was broadcast on CBC Television.

== Best Dramatic Series ==
- Da Vinci’s Inquest – Haddock Entertainment, Barna-Alper Productions, Alliance Atlantis Productions, Canadian Broadcasting Corporation. Producers: Chris Haddock, Laszlo Barna, Lynn Barr, Tom Braidwood
- Drop the Beat – Back Alley Film Productions. Producers: Adrienne Mitchell, Christine Shipton, Janis Lundman
- Stargate SG-1 – Stargate SG-1 Productions. Producers: John Smith, Robert C. Cooper, Michael Greenburg, Richard Dean Anderson, Brad Wright
- The Outer Limits – Alliance Atlantis, Atlantis Films, Showtime Networks, Trilogy Entertainment. Producers: John Watson, Brent Karl Clackson, Pen Densham, Sam Egan, Richard Barton Lewis
- Twice in a Lifetime – Pebblehut Productions, Paxson Entertainment, CTV Television Network. Producers – Michael Prupas, Stephen Brackley, Barney Rosenzweig, Marilyn Stonehouse, Michael J. Maschio

== Best TV Movie or Dramatic Mini-series ==
- Dr. Lucille: The Lucille Teasdale Story – TVA International/Motion International, Ballistic Pictures. Producers: Francine Allaire, Claude Bonin, Andre Picard
- Restless Spirits – Accent Entertainment, Temple Street Productions. Producers: Sheila Hockin, Patrick Whitley, Susan Cavan
- Murder Most Likely – Alliance Atlantis, CTV Television Network, Judas Kiss Productions, Two Bridges Entertainment, Telefilm Canada. Producers: Frank Siracusa, Anne Marie La Traverse, Paul Gross, R.B.Carney, Robert Forsyth
- One Heart Broken Into Song – Picture Plant, Canadian Broadcasting Corporation. Producers: William D. MacGillivray, Terry Greenlaw
- The Sheldon Kennedy Story – Alberta Filmworks, Sarrazin Couture Entertainment. Producers: Pierre Sarrazin, Doug MacLeod

== Best Short Dramatic Program ==
- A Feeling Called Glory – Cracked Pot Films. Producer: Coreen Mayrs
- My Father’s Hands – Hungry Eyes Media. Producer: Jennifer Holness
- The Daily Blade – Jigsaw Productions. Producer: David Coole

== Best Comedy Program or Series ==
- This Hour Has 22 Minutes – Salter Street Films, Canadian Broadcasting Corporation. Producers: Michael Donovan, Geoff D’Eon, Mark Farrell, Ginny Jones-Duzak, Jack Kellum
- Dave Broadfoot: Old Dog, New Tricks – Abbott-Ferguson Productions. Producers: Dave Broadfoot, Don Ferguson
- Double Exposure – CBC Radio One. Producers: Bob Robertson, Linda Cullen, Nick Orchard
- Made in Canada – Salter Street Films, Island Edge. Producers: Gerald Lunz, Michael Donovan
- Air Farce Live – Canadian Broadcasting Corporation. Producers: Roger Abbott, Don Ferguson
- Bob and Margaret – Nelvana. Producers: David Fine, Michael Hirsh, Patrick Loubert, Alison Snowden, Clive A. Smith

== Best Music, Variety Program or Series ==
- East Coast Music Awards 2000 – (East Coast Music Association, CBC Halifax). Producers: Geoff D’Eon, Jac Gautreau, Michael Lewis
- A George Fox Christmas – Alberta Filmworks. Producers: Tinti Moffat, Randy Bradshaw, Tony Baylis
- Double Exposure – Another Swift Kick in the Year End – CBC Radio One. Producers: Bob Robertson, Linda Cullen, Nick Orchard
- Intimate and Interactive – MuchMusic. Producer: Sheila Sullivan
- YAA! The YTV Achievement Awards – The 10th Anniversary – YTV. Producer: Joanne P. Jackson

== Best Performing Arts Program or Series, or Arts Documentary Program or Series ==
- Life and Times – Tall Tales From The Long Corner: The Life and Times of Ronnie Hawkins – 90th Parallel Productions, Canadian Broadcasting Corporation. Producer: Gordon Henderson

== Donald Brittain Award for Best Social/Political Documentary Program ==
- Deep Inside Clint Star – National Film Board of Canada. Producer: Silva Basmajian
- Asylum: Falling Through the Cracks – Canadian Broadcasting Corporation. Producer: Christopher Sumpton
- Kikkik – Women's Television Network. Producer: Ole Gjerstad
- Legacy of Terror: The Bombing of Air India – Bishari Films, TVOntario. Producers: Shelley Saywell, Rudy Buttignol
- The View from Here – The Holier It Gets – Mercury Films, Requisite Films, TVOntario. Producers: Nicholas de Pencier, Jennifer Baichwal, Rudy Buttignol

== Best Documentary Series ==
- The View from Here – TVOntario. Producer: Rudy Buttignol
- Urban Angels of Medicine – Infinite Monkeys Productions, Microtainment Plus International. Producers: Lon Appleby, Garry Blye, Howard Berstein, Mark Shekter
- SexTV – Citytv. Producers: Brad Brough, Moses Znaimer, Marcia Martin
- The Sexual Century – Barna-Alper Productions. Producers: Laszlo Barna, Sally Doganis
- Witness – Canadian Broadcasting Corporation. Producers: Charlotte Odele, Marie Natanson, Hilary Armstrong

== Best History/Biography Documentary Program ==
- Sunrise Over Tiananmen Square – National Film Board of Canada. Producers: Donald McWilliams, Barrie Angus McLean
- Life and Times – Ambition: The Life & Times of Ted Rogers – 90th Parallel Productions, Canadian Broadcasting Corporation. Producer: Gordon Henderson
- The Man Who Might Have Been – An Inquiry Into the Life and Death of Herbert Norman – National Film Board of Canada. Producer: Gerry Flahive
- The Viking Saga: The Era of the Long Ships – Galafilm, Agaton Film & TV. Producers: Arnie Gelbart, Bo G. Ericson, Lars Rengfelt
- Unwanted Soldiers – National Film Board of Canada. Producer: Karen King

== Best Science, Technology, Nature, Environment or Adventure Documentary Program ==
- After Darwin – Galafilm, PTV Productions. Producer: Arnie Gelbart
- Edge of Extinction: Saving the Leatherback Sea Turtle – Breakthrough Entertainment. Producers: Stuart Goodman, Andrea Boyd, Peter Williamson, Ira Levy
- Tatshenshini-Alsek Park: Heart of the Wilderness – Good Earth Productions, Bonterra Productions. Producers: Ihor Macijiwsky, Mitchell Azaria
- The Nature of Things – Parkinson's: Lynda's Story – Canadian Broadcasting Corporation. Producer: David Tucker
- The Secret World of Gardens – Bullfrog Films. Producer: Susan Fleming

== Best News Information Series ==
- the fifth estate – Canadian Broadcasting Corporation. Producers: David Studer, Susan Teskey
- CounterSpin – CBC Newsworld. Producers: Tom Jokinen, Paul Jay, Ron Haggart
- Marketplace – Canadian Broadcasting Corporation. Producers: Leslie Peck, Julie Bristow
- Undercurrents – Canadian Broadcasting Corporation. Producers: Pam Bertrand, F.N. Morrison
- Venture – Canadian Broadcasting Corporation. Producers: Sophia Hadzipetros, Marie Clarke

== Best Newscast/News Special ==
- The National/CBC News – Canadian Broadcasting Corporation. Producers: Kelly Crichton, Nigel Gibson, Fred Parker
- 24 Hours: Pan Am Games Producer: Cecil Rosner
- CTV National News – Egyptair Flight 9–90 CTV Television Network. Producers: Henry Kowalski, Robert Hurst
- Newswatch – Live from La Place du 6 decembre – Producer: Tony Ross
- Sunday Report – Canadian Broadcasting Corporation. Producer: Hedy Korbee

== Best Talk/General Information Series ==
- Skylight – VisionTV. Producer: Rita Deverell
- Bynon – PrimeTV. Producer: Arlene Bynon
- Hot Type – CBC Newsworld. Producers: Evan Solomon, Andrew Johnson
- Imprint – CBC Newsworld. Producers: Linda Dunlop, Richard Ouzounian
- Men on Women – Producer: Heather Ryall

== Best Lifestyle Series ==
- Foodessence – Salter Street Films. Producer: Charles Bishop
- Loving Spoonfuls – Indivisual Productions. Producer: Allan Novak
- Moving On – Canadian Broadcasting Corporation, TVOntario. Producer: Doug Caldwell
- Savoir Faire Specials – Primevista Television. Producer: Michael Prini
- shiftTV – Shift Magazine. Producer: Andrew Heintzman, Cathie James

== Best Animated Program or Series or Short Animated Program ==
- Angela Anaconda – Decode Entertainment/C.O.R.E. Digital Pictures. Producers: Steven DeNure, Neil Court, Joanna Ferrone, John Mariella, Sue Rose, Beth Stevenson
- Beast Machines: Transformers – Mark Ralston, Ian Pearson, Asaph Fipke
- Franklin – Nelvana. Producers: Clive A. Smith, Michael Hirsh, Patrick Loubert
- Rolie Polie Olie- Nelvana, Métal Hurlant Productions. Producers: Clive A. Smith, Michael Hirsh, Patrick Loubert, William Joyce, Fabrice Giger
- Something From Nothing – Portfolio Entertainment, Funbag Animation Studios, Noreen Young Productions. Producers: Lisa Olfman, Rick Morrison, Curtis Crawford

== Best Preschool Program or Series ==
- Polka Dot Shorts – TVOntario. Producer: Jed MacKay
- Panda Bear Daycare – YTV, Radical Sheep Productions. Producers: John Leitch, Rob Mills
- Polkaroo's Number Wonders – TVOntario. Producer: Marie McCann
- Ruffus the Dog – YTV, Radical Sheep Productions. Producers: John Leitch, Rob Mills
- Scoop and Doozie – Queen Bee Productions. Producer: Romney Grant

== Best Children’s or Youth Program or Series ==
- Incredible Story Studios – Mind's Eye Entertainment, Vérité Films. Producers: Kevin DeWalt, Robert de Lint, Rob King, Virginia Thompson
- Popular Mechanics For Kids – SDA Productions. Producers: Michael C. Lavoie, Jonathan Finkelstein, André A. Bélanger
- Street Cents – Canadian Broadcasting Corporation. Producer: Barbara Kennedy
- The Worst Witch – United Productions. Producers: Angela Beeching, Michael Haggiag, Dan Maddicott, Arnie Gelbart
- Yaa! To the M@X – YTV. Producers: Michel C. Lavoie, Jonathan Finkelstein, André A. Bélanger

== Best Sports Program or Series ==
- Legends of Hockey – Network Entertainment. Producers: Derik Murray, John Hamilton
- Crossing the White Line – Producers: Jack Rabinovitch, Simcha Jacobovici, Elliott Halpern
- Dying to Win – Paradigm Pictures. Producers: Marrin Canell, Ted Remerowski
- Lady of the Lake – Producers: Frank Savoie, Alan Mendelsohn, Laszlo Barna
- Sports Journal – CBC Sports. Terry Walker, Claude Panet-Raymond, Tom Harrington, Ken Dodd

== Best Live Sporting Event ==
- Pan Am Games – CBC Sports. Producers: Joel Darling, Mike Brannagan
- Air Canada Championship Producers: Greg Breakell, Deb Sanderson, Jeffrey Mather
- TSN Blue Jays Baseball – TSN. Producers: Bruce Perrin, Rick Briggs-Jude

== Best Live Special Event Coverage ==
- 2000 Today – CBC Newsworld. Producers: Mark Bulgutch, Pam McNair, Chris Waddell
- Canada AM – CTV Television Network. Producers: Michael Serapio, Zev Shalev
- @discovery.ca – Live From Mars – Discovery Channel. Producers: Alex Bystram, Deanna Kraus, Craig Colby, Penny Park, Jane Mingay
- Manitoba Votes 1999 – CBC Manitoba. Producer: Cecil Rosner
- Much@Woodstock '99 – Much Television. Producers: David Kines, Denise Donlon

== Best Direction in a Dramatic Program or Mini-series ==
- David Wellington – Restless Spirits (Accent Entertainment/Temple Street Productions)
- Coreen Mayrs – A Feeling Called Glory (Cracked Pot Films)
- George Mihalka – Dr. Lucille: The Lucille Teasdale Story (TVA International/Motion International/Ballistic Pictures)
- Brad Turner – Must Be Santa (CBC)
- Norma Bailey – The Sheldon Kennedy Story (Alberta Filmworks/Sarrazin Couture Entertainment)

== Best Direction in a Dramatic Series ==
- Ken Finkleman – Foolish Heart – The Critic (CBC)
- Giles Walker – Cold Squad (Keatley MacLeod Productions/Atlantis Films)
- Fred Frame – Mentors (Mind's Eye Entertainment/Anaid Productions)
- Albert Kish – Power Play (CTV Originals/NDG Productions/Serendipity Point Films/Alliance Atlantis)
- Jerry Ciccoritti – The City Sarrazin Couture Entertainment)

== Best Direction in an Information Program or Series ==
- Neil Docherty – the fifth estate – Legacy of Pain (CBC)
- Douglas Spencer – Off the Map (DBS-Gorica Productions)
- Marian MacNair, Serge Marcil, Sid Goldberg, Jean Louis Côté – Popular Mechanics For Kids (SDA Productions)
- Oleh Rumak, Claude Vickery, Jennifer Campbell – the fifth estate (CBC)
- Randy Werle – Undercurrents (CBC)

== Best Direction in a Documentary Program ==
- Lesley Ann Patten – The Voice Set Free (Tightwire Productions)
- Beverly Shaffer – Just a Wedding (NFB)
- Shelley Saywell – Legacy of Terror: The Bombing of Air India (Bishari Films/TVOntario)
- Lewis Cohen – Road Stories for the Flesh Eating Future (Galafilm)
- Shui-Bo Wang – Sunrise Over Tiananmen Square (NFB)

== Best Direction in a Documentary Series ==
- Jennifer Baichwal – The View from Here – The Holier It Gets (Mercury Films/Requisite Films/TVOntario)
- Peter von Puttkamer – Champions of the Wild – Bald Eagles (Omnifilm Entertainment/NFB)
- Leslie Côté – Forbidden Places (MapleRock Entertainment)
- Samantha Linton – The Sex Files (Exploration Production)

== Best Direction in a Comedy Program or Series ==
- Henry Sarwer-Foner – Made in Canada – Damacles Directs (Salter Street Films/Island Edge)
- Craig Pryce – I Was a Sixth Grade Alien (Winklemania Productions/AAC Kids)
- Mike Clattenburg, Michael Lewis – The Bette Show (Salter Street Films)
- Henry Sarwer-Foner – This Hour Has 22 Minutes (Salter Street Films, CBC)
- Bruce McDonald – Twitch City (Shadow Shows/Accent Entertainment/Canadian Broadcasting Corporation)

== Best Direction in a Variety, or Performing Arts Program or Series ==
- Shelagh O'Brien – YAA! The YTV Achievement Awards – The 10th Anniversary – (YTV)
- René Dowhaniuk – 14th Gemini Awards (Academy of Canadian Cinema & Television)
- Mike Downie – Blue Rodeo: The Scenes in Between (Canadian Broadcasting Corporation|CBC)
- Raymond Saint-Jean – The Child of Music (Cine Qua Non Films)
- Larry Bauman – They Live to Polka (NFB)

== Best Writing in a Dramatic Program or Mini-series ==
- Rob Forsyth – Dr. Lucille: The Lucille Teasdale Story (TVA International/Motion International/Ballistic Pictures)
- Coreen Mayrs – A Feeling Called Glory (Cracked Pot Films)
- Semi Chellas, Gail Collins – Restless Spirits (Accent Entertainment/Temple Street Productions)
- Jeremy Hole – External Affairs (Shaftesbury Films/Alliance Atlantis)
- George Elliott Clarke – One Heart Broken Into Song (Picture Plant/CBC)

== Best Writing in a Dramatic Series ==
- Julie Lacey – Power Play – Foolish Hearts (CTV Originals/NDG Productions/Serendipity Point Films/Alliance Atlantis)
- David Sutherland – Drop the Beat (Back Alley Film Productions)
- Sam Egan – The Outer Limits (Alliance Atlantis/Atlantis Films/Showtime Networks/Trilogy Entertainment)
- Peter Mitchell, Graham Clegg – Traders (Atlantis Films)

== Best Writing in a Comedy or Variety Program or Series ==
- Cathy Jones, Luciano Casimiri, Mark Farrell, Chris Finn, Edward Kay, Rick Mercer, Christian Murray, Tim Steeves, Greg Thomey, Mary Walsh, George Westerholm – This Hour Has 22 Minutes (Salter Street Films, CBC)
- Bob Robertson, Linda Cullen – Double Exposure (CBC Radio One)
- Mark Farrell, Edward Riche – Made in Canada (Salter Street Films, Island Edge)
- Steve Smith, Bob Bainborough, Shaun Graham, Bruce Pirrie, Richard McDonald, Jeff Lumby – The Red Green Show (Red Green Productions)

== Best Writing in an Information Program or Series ==
- Francine Pelletier – the fifth estate – Legacy of Pain (CBC)
- Donna Gabriel – Foodessence (Salter Street Films)
- Matt Cowan – Undercurrents (CBC)
- Tracie Tighe, David Gray – Venture (CBC)

== Best Writing in a Documentary Program or Series ==
- Jennifer Baichwal – The View from Here – The Holier It Gets (Mercury Films/Requisite Films/TVOntario)
- Bill Cameron, Robin Benger – Asylum: Falling Through the Cracks (CBC)
- Shelley Saywell – Legacy of Terror: The Bombing of Air India (Bishari Films, TVOntario)
- Shelley Saywell – Out of the Fire (Bishari Films)
- Jerry Thompson – Stopping Traffik: The War Against the War on Drugs

== Best Writing in a Children’s or Youth Program ==
- Vicki Grant – Scoop and Doozie – What Rubbish! (Queen Bee Productions)
- John van Bruggen – Franklin (Nelvana)
- Rob Mills – Ruffus the Dog (YTV/Radical Sheep Productions)
- Phoebe Gilman, Christel Kleitsch, Avrum Jacobson – Something From Nothing (Portfolio Entertainment/Funbag Animation Studios/Noreen Young Productions)
- Heather Conkie – The Artists' Specials – Degas and the Dancer (Devine Entertainment)

== Best Performance by an Actor in a Leading Role in a Dramatic Program or Mini-series ==
- Jonathan Scarfe – The Sheldon Kennedy Story (Alberta Filmworks/Sarrazin Couture Entertainment)
- Victor Garber – External Affairs (Shaftesbury Films/Alliance Atlantis)
- Paul Gross – Murder Most Likely (Alliance Atlantis/CTV/Judas Kiss Productions/Two Bridges Entertainment/Telefilm Canada)
- Rainbow Sun Francks – One Heart Broken Into Song (Picture Plant/CBC)
- Brent Carver – The Legend of Sleepy Hollow (Muse Entertainment/Hallmark Entertainment)

== Best Performance by an Actress in a Leading Role in a Dramatic Program or Mini-series ==
- Colleen Rennison – A Feeling Called Glory (Cracked Pot Films)
- Megan Follows – Anne of Green Gables: The Continuing Story (Sullivan Entertainment)
- Marina Orsini – Dr. Lucille: The Lucille Teasdale Story (TVA International/Motion International/Ballistic Pictures)
- Deanna Milligan – Must Be Santa (CBC)
- Polly Shannon – The Sheldon Kennedy Story (Alberta Filmworks/Sarrazin Couture Entertainment)

== Best Performance by an Actor in a Continuing Leading Dramatic Role ==
- Michael Riley – Power Play – What It All Meant (CTV Originals/NDG Productions/Serendipity Point Films/Alliance Atlantis)
- Nicholas Campbell – Da Vinci's Inquest (Haddock Entertainment/Barna-Alper Productions/Alliance Atlantis Productions/Canadian Broadcasting Corporation)
- Ian Tracey – Da Vinci's Inquest (Haddock Entertainment/Barna-Alper Productions/Alliance Atlantis Productions/Canadian Broadcasting Corporation)
- Donnelly Rhodes – Da Vinci's Inquest (Haddock Entertainment/Barna-Alper Productions/Alliance Atlantis Productions/Canadian Broadcasting Corporation)
- Ted Atherton – Nothing Too Good for a Cowboy (Alliance Communications/Milestone Productions)

== Best Performance by an Actress in a Continuing Leading Dramatic Role ==
- Torri Higginson – The City – Properties of Light (Sarrazin Couture Entertainment)
- Julie Stewart – Cold Squad (Keatley MacLeod Productions/Atlantis Films)
- Caroline Néron – Cover Me (Alliance Atlantis/Power Pictures/Serendipity Point Films)
- Sarah Chalke – Nothing Too Good for a Cowboy (Alliance Communications/Milestone Productions)
- Kari Matchett – Power Play (CTV Originals/NDG Productions/Serendipity Point Films/Alliance Atlantis)
- Sonja Smits – Traders (Atlantis Films)

== Best Performance by an Actor in a Guest Role Dramatic Series ==
- Geordie Johnson – The City – Bed Fellows (Sarrazin Couture Entertainment)
- John Cassini – Da Vinci's Inquest – The Lottery (Haddock Entertainment/Barna-Alper Productions/Alliance Atlantis Productions/Canadian Broadcasting Corporation)
- Matt Frewer – Da Vinci's Inquest – Fantasy (Haddock Entertainment/Barna-Alper Productions/Alliance Atlantis Productions/Canadian Broadcasting Corporation)
- Jere Burns – Twice in a Lifetime – The Trouble with Harry (Pebblehut Productions/Paxson Entertainment/CTV)
- Brent Carver – Twice in a Lifetime – The Trouble with Harry (Pebblehut Productions/Paxson Entertainment/CTV)

== Best Performance by an Actress in a Guest Role Dramatic Series ==
- Alisen Down – Cold Squad – Dead Beat Walking (Keatley MacLeod Productions/Atlantis Films)
- Alisen Down – Da Vinci's Inquest Bang Like That (Haddock Entertainment/Barna-Alper Productions/Alliance Atlantis Productions/Canadian Broadcasting Corporation)
- Janet-Laine Green – Traders (Atlantis Films)
- Taylor Anne Reid – Da Vinci's Inquest (Haddock Entertainment/Barna-Alper Productions/Alliance Atlantis Productions/Canadian Broadcasting Corporation)
- Sheila McCarthy – The City (Sarrazin Couture Entertainment)

== Best Performance by an Actor in a Featured Supporting Role in a Dramatic Program or Mini-series ==
- Robert Wisden – The Sheldon Kennedy Story (Alberta Filmworks/Sarrazin Couture Entertainment)
- Kenneth Welsh – External Affairs (Shaftesbury Films/Alliance Atlantis)
- Henry Czerny – External Affairs (Shaftesbury Films/Alliance Atlantis)
- Ardon Bess – One Heart Broken Into Song (Picture Plant/CBC)
- Noel Fisher – The Sheldon Kennedy Story (Alberta Filmworks/Sarrazin Couture Entertainment)

== Best Performance by an Actress in a Featured Supporting Role in a Dramatic Program or Mini-series ==
- Shirley Douglas – Shadow Lake (Shadow Lake Productions/Breakthrough Entertainment/Sound Venture Productions)
- Marie-Josée Croze – Murder Most Likely (Alliance Atlantis/CTV/Judas Kiss Productions/Two Bridges Entertainment/Telefilm Canada)
- Janine Theriault – Murder Most Likely (Alliance Atlantis/CTV/Judas Kiss Productions/Two Bridges Entertainment/Telefilm Canada)

== Best Performance by an Actor in a Featured Supporting Role in a Dramatic Series ==
- Pedro Salvin – Amazon – The Chosen (Alliance Atlantis
- Duncan Fraser – Da Vinci's Inquest – The Hanged Man (Haddock Entertainment/Barna-Alper Productions/Alliance Atlantis Productions/Canadian Broadcasting Corporation)
- Jonathan Rannells – Power Play (CTV Originals/NDG Productions/Serendipity Point Films/Alliance Atlantis)

== Best Performance by an Actress in a Featured Supporting Role in a Dramatic Series ==
- Shannon Lawson – The City – Free Fall (Sarrazin Couture Entertainment)
- Jackie Burroughs – Cover Me (Alliance Atlantis/Power Pictures/Serendipity Point Films)
- Anita La Selva – Earth: Final Conflict (Atlantis Films)
- Rachael Crawford – Traders (Atlantis Films)
- Angela Vinat – Traders (Atlantis Films)

== Best Performance in a Comedy Program or Series ==
- Cathy Jones, Rick Mercer, Greg Thomey, Mary Walsh – This Hour Has 22 Minutes (Salter Street Films, CBC)
- Gavin Crawford – Comedy Now! – Uncensored (CTV)
- Dave Broadfoot – Dave Broadfoot: Old Dog, New Tricks (Abbott-Ferguson Productions)
- Harland Williams – Comedy Now! – Harland’s Hilarious Hour (CTV)
- Patrick McKenna, Jerry Schaefer, Wayne Robson, Steve Smith, Peter Keleghan, Bob Bainborough, Jeff Lumby, Joel Harris, Graham Greene – The Red Green Show (Red Green Productions)

== Best Performance or Host in a Variety Program or Series ==
- Brigitte Gall – Brigitte Gall: Joan of Montréal (Leopard Films)
- Rick Mercer – 14th Gemini Awards (Academy of Canadian Cinema & Television)
- Clint Moffatt, Scott Moffatt, Dave Moffatt, Bob Moffatt – Juno Awards of 2000 (Canadian Academy of Recording Arts and Sciences)
- Teresa Pavlinek, Sarah Lafleur, Matthew Sharp, Janet van de Graaf, Ron Pardo, Bob Bainborough, Patrick McKenna, Rick Green – History Bites (The History Channel)
- David Hyde Pierce – Just for Laughs (Just for Laughs Comedy Festival)

== Best Performance in a Performing Arts Program or Series ==
- Juan Chioran – Dracula (TVOntario)
- Ginette Reno – Governor General's Performing Arts Awards (CBC Radio/National Arts Centre/Canada Council of the Arts/Canadian Conference of the Arts/Department of Canadian Heritage)
- Ron Hynes – Ron Hynes: The Irish Tour (Rink Rat Productions)

== Best Performance in a Preschool Program or Series ==
- Sheila McCarthy – Sesame Park – Little Miss Muffet (CBC)
- Jayne Eastwood – Noddy (Catalyst Entertainment)
- Sean McCann – Noddy (Catalyst Entertainment)
- Rob Mills – Ruffus the Dog (YTV/Radical Sheep Productions)
- James Rankin – Scoop and Doozie (Queen Bee Productions)
- Pier Paquette – Sesame Park (CBC)

== Best Performance in a Children’s or Youth Program or Series ==
- Matt Frewer – Mentors – A Transient, Shining Trouble (Mind's Eye Entertainment, Anaid Productions)
- Patty Sullivan – Kids' Canada – Let's Get Real: Life at School (CBC Kids)
- Elliot Page (nominated as Ellen Philpotts Page) – Pit Pony (Cochran Entertainment)
- Michael Scholar Jr., Duane Hall, Kim D’Eon, Nikki Barnett, Andrew Bush – Street Cents Music – (CBC)
- Thomas Jay Ryan – The Artists' Specials – Degas and the Dancer (Devine Entertainment)

== Best News Anchor ==
- Diana Swain – Manitoba Votes 1999 (CBC Manitoba)
- Gloria Macarenko – Broadcast One (CBC)
- Lloyd Robertson – CTV National News – A Millennium Celebration/Budget 2000/A Royal Wedding
- Lisa LaFlamme – CTV National News – Millennium Special/Federal Budget/Egyptair Flight 9–90
- Peter Mansbridge – The National/CBC News – 2000 Today – Mystery to Mars/A Royal Wedding (CBC Newsworld)

== Best Reportage ==
- Don Murray – The National/CBC News – Traumatized Kids/Canada Bound/Revenge Attacks (CBC Newsworld)
- Avis Favaro – CTV National News – Medical Mistake
- Alan Fryer – CTV National News – The Elian Gonzalez Mystique
- Paul Workman – The National/CBC News – Ruined Economy/Street Orphans (CBC Newsworld)
- Terry Milewski – The National/CBC News – Seattle Showdown Day 1 (CBC Newsworld)

== Best Information Segment ==
- Jennifer Campbell, Erin Paul – the fifth estate – Too Bad to Be True (CBC)
- Christian Coté, Melanie Verhaeghe – 24 Hours: Sins of the Father (CBC)
- Jim MacQuarrie – CBC News: Country Canada
- Nancy Durham – The Magazine/CBC Newsworld
- Tom Clark, Robert Osborne, Wendy Trueman, Avis Favaro – W5 (CTV)

== Best Host or Interviewer in a News or Talk/General Information Program or Series ==
- Robert Mason Lee – Mason Lee: On The Edge – Newspaper Wars/Mixed Bag #1/Spiritual Matters (Agincourt Productions/CTV)
- Avi Lewis – CounterSpin (CBC Newsworld)
- Evan Solomon – Hot Type (CBC Newsworld)
- Victor Malarek – the fifth estate (CBC)
- Wendy Mesley – Undercurrents (CBC)

== Best Host in a Lifestyle, or Performing Arts Program or Series ==
- Peter Jordan – It's a Living – Swimming with Sharks/King for a Day/Song (CBC Manitoba/Life Network)
- Marilyn Denis – CityLine (Citytv)
- Jeanne Beker – FashionTelevision (CHUM)
- Wayne Rostad – On the Road Again (CBC)
- Maureen Taylor – Your Health (TVOntario)

== Best Sportscaster/Anchor ==
- Brian Williams – Pan Am Games (CBC Sports)
- Dave Randorf – Pan Am Games (CBC Sports)
- Ron MacLean – Hockey Day in Canada – Celebrating the Game (CBC Sports)
- Rod Black – NBA on CTV – San Antonio at Toronto (Sportsnet)
- Jim Hughson – NHL on CTV Sportsnet, 1999–2000 (Sportsnet)

== Best Photography in a Dramatic Program or Series ==
- Michael Buckley – Dr. Lucille: The Lucille Teasdale Story (TVA International/Motion International/Ballistic Pictures)
- Robert Saad – 'Anne of Green Gables: The Continuing Story (Sullivan Entertainment)
- André Pienaar – Restless Spirits (Accent Entertainment/Temple Street Productions)
- Albert J. Dunk – Must Be Santa (CBC)

== Best Photography in a Comedy, Variety, Performing Arts Program or Series ==
- Marc Charlebois – The Child of Music (Cine Qua Non Films)
- Peter McCallum – Blue Rodeo: The Scenes in Between (Canadian Broadcasting Corporation|CBC)
- Kelly Pykerman – Intimate and Interactive (MuchMusic)
- Danny Nowak – Twitch City (Shadow Shows/Accent Entertainment/Canadian Broadcasting Corporation)
- Jean Renaud – Voice of a Child: The Foster Parents Plan Gala

== Best Photography in an Information Program or Series ==
- Stephane Brisson – CTV National News – Clock Watcher
- Greg Stanton, Chris Triffo – A Soldier’s Voice
- Ross MacIntosh – CTV National News – Portrait: Barrie Wentzell
- John Griffin – the fifth estate (CBC)
- Rick McVicar – The Goods (CBC)

== Best Photography in a Documentary Program or Series ==
- Richard Stringer – Exhibit A: Secrets of Forensic Science – Double Jeopardy (Kensington Communications)
- Michael Nolan – Frontiers of Construction – Dream Factories (Ragged Earth Productions/Barna-Alper Productions)
- Frank Vilaca – Forbidden Places (MapleRock Entertainment)
- Keith Brust, Rick Boston – The Secret World of Gardens (Bullfrog Films)
- Jim Scott – Warriors of the Night (Nightfighter Productions)

== Best Visual Effects ==
- John Gajdecki, David Alexander, Barb Benoit, Jen Vuckovic – Must Be Santa (CBC)
- Tony Willis, Alex Boothby – Anne of Green Gables: The Continuing Story (Sullivan Entertainment)
- Alwyn Kumst, Ken Whitmore, Noel Hooper, Paul Ackerley – Amazon (Alliance Atlantis
- James Tichenor, Michele Comens, Wray J. Douglas, Kent Matheson, Simon Lacey, John Gajdecki – Stargate SG-1 (Stargate SG-1 Productions)
- Dug Claxton, Sasha Jarh, Jon Campfens, Wendy Whaley – Total Recall 2070 – Meet My Maker (ONtv/Alliance Atlantis)

== Best Picture Editing in a Dramatic Program or Series ==
- Ralph Brunjes – Murder Most Likely (Alliance Atlantis/CTV/Judas Kiss Productions/Two Bridges Entertainment/Telefilm Canada)
- Jane Morrison – Da Vinci's Inquest (Haddock Entertainment/Barna-Alper Productions/Alliance Atlantis Productions/Canadian Broadcasting Corporation)
- Susan Maggi – One Heart Broken Into Song (Picture Plant/CBC)
- Rik Morden – The Artists' Specials – Rembrandt: Fathers & Sons (Devine Entertainment)
- Jeff Warren – The Sheldon Kennedy Story (Alberta Filmworks/Sarrazin Couture Entertainment)

== Best Picture Editing in a Comedy, Variety, Performing Arts Program or Series ==
- Jackie Dzuba – They Live to Polka (NFB)
- Todd Foster, Keith Bradley, Eric Campbell, Gregg Antworth, Allan MacLean – This Hour Has 22 Minutes (Salter Street Films, CBC)
- David Murphy, Andrew Kines – tvframes
- Stephen Withrow – Twitch City (Shadow Shows/Accent Entertainment/Canadian Broadcasting Corporation)
- Christopher Cooper – The Daily Blade (Jigsaw Productions)
- Trevor Ambrose – I Was a Sixth Grade Alien (Winklemania Productions/AAC Kids)

== Best Picture Editing in an Information Program or Series ==
- Michèle Hozer – The Nature of Things – Race for the Future II (CBC)
- Sarah Lalumiere – On the Road Again (CBC)
- Tony Coleman – Undercurrents (CBC)
- Steve Thomson – Venture (CBC)

== Best Picture Editing in a Documentary Program or Series ==
- David Wharnsby – The View from Here – The Holier It Gets (Mercury Films/Requisite Films/TVOntario)
- Deborah Palloway – Out of the Fire (Bishari Films)
- Brian Williams, Andy Keen – Seven Painters Seven Places
- Shelly Hamer – Through a Blue Lens (NFB
- Patricia Tassinari – Working Like Crazy (NFB

== Best Production Design or Art Direction in a Dramatic Program or Series ==
- Richard Hudolin, Mark Davidson, Robert Davidson, Brentan Harron, Bridget McGuire, Douglas McLean, Ivana Vasak – Stargate SG-1 – The Devil You Know (Stargate SG-1 Productions)
- François Lamontagne – Dr. Lucille: The Lucille Teasdale Story (TVA International/Motion International/Ballistic Pictures)
- Darlene Lewis, Stephen Osler – One Heart Broken Into Song (Picture Plant/CBC)
- Norman Sarazin – The Legend of Sleepy Hollow (Muse Entertainment, Hallmark Entertainment)
- David Hackl – Lexx (Salter Street Films/CHUM Television)

== Best Production Design or Art Direction in a Non-Dramatic Program or Series ==
- Nuala O’Flynn – MuchMusic Video Awards 1999 (MuchMusic)
- Stephen Osler – This Hour Has 22 Minutes (Salter Street Films, CBC)
- Andrew Murray – Comedy Now! – Uncensored (CTV)
- James Hubbard – eNow

== Best Costume Design ==
- Ruy Filipe – Dr. Lucille: The Lucille Teasdale Story (TVA International/Motion International/Ballistic Pictures)
- Ruth Secord – 'Anne of Green Gables: The Continuing Story (Sullivan Entertainment)
- Laurie Drew – La Femme Nikita (Baton Broadcasting/Fireworks Entertainment)
- Christina McQuarrie – Stargate SG-1 (Stargate SG-1 Productions)
- Lea Carlson – Twitch City (Shadow Shows/Accent Entertainment/Canadian Broadcasting Corporation)

== Best Achievement in Makeup ==
- Pip Ayotte, Marlene Aarons, Jocelyn MacDonald – Amazon – War (Alliance Atlantis
- Sherry Baker, Catherine Davies Irvine – I Was a Sixth Grade Alien (Winklemania Productions/AAC Kids)
- Lynda McCormack, Jenny Arbour – Murder Most Likely (Alliance Atlantis/CTV/Judas Kiss Productions/Two Bridges Entertainment/Telefilm Canada)
- Christopher Mark Pinhey, Ryan Nicholson, Holland Miller, Fay von Schroeder, Jan Newman – Stargate SG-1 (Stargate SG-1 Productions)
- Michelle Pedersen, Devyn Griffith – The New Addams Family (Film Incentive B.C./Fox Family Worldwide/Shavick Entertainment/Saban Entertainment)
- Fay von Schroeder, Tibor Farkas, David Dupuis, Steve Johnson, Joe Colwell – The Outer Limits (Alliance Atlantis/Atlantis Films/Showtime Networks/Trilogy Entertainment)

== Best Overall Sound in a Dramatic Program or Series ==
- Allen Ormerod, Daniel Latour, Scott Shepherd – La Femme Nikita (Baton Broadcasting/Fireworks Entertainment)
- Richard Penn, Orest Sushko, Lou Solakofski – Restless Spirits (Accent Entertainment, Temple Street Productions)
- Alex Salter, Lou Solakofski, Jim Rillie, Orest Sushko – One Heart Broken Into Song (Picture Plant/CBC)
- Dan Daniels, Stephan Carrier, Jack Heeren – Amazon (Alliance Atlantis
- Orest Sushko, Shane Connelly, Dino Pigat – The Sheldon Kennedy Story (Alberta Filmworks, Sarrazin Couture Entertainment)

== Best Sound Editing in a Dramatic Program or Series ==
- Jane Tattersall, Rick Cadger, David McCallum, Donna Powell – Restless Spirits (Accent Entertainment, Temple Street Productions)
- Antoine Morin, Guy Pelletier, Jacques Plante, Viateur Paiement – Dr. Lucille: The Lucille Teasdale Story (TVA International/Motion International/Ballistic Pictures)
- Chris Czopnik, Allan Fung, John Douglas Smith, Steve Baine, Tom Bjelic – Earth: Final Conflict (Atlantis Films)
- Rick Cadger, Terry Burke, Alastair Gray, Alison Clark – Murder Most Likely (Alliance Atlantis/CTV/Judas Kiss Productions/Two Bridges Entertainment/Telefilm Canada)
- Rose Gregoris, Craig Henighan, Steve Baine, Jill Purdy – La Femme Nikita (Baton Broadcasting/Fireworks Entertainment)

== Best Sound in a Comedy, Variety, or Performing Arts Program or Series ==
- Mike Baskerville, Colin Baxter, Dan Daniels, Tim Roberts, David Drainie Taylor – Twitch City – Shinto Death Cults (Shadow Shows/Accent Entertainment/Canadian Broadcasting Corporation)
- René Beaudry, Neal Gaudet, Bob Melanson, Kenny MacDonald, P.J. MacNeil – This Hour Has 22 Minutes (Salter Street Films, CBC)
- Alan deGraaf, Eric Mattar-Hurlbut, Glenn Barna, Michael Werth, Mike Northcott -Rolie Polie Olie – (Nelvana/Métal Hurlant Productions)
- Marcel Duperreault, Todd Araki – Weird-Ohs (Decode Entertainment/EM.TV/Mainframe Studios/Testor Corporation
- Simon Bowers, Steve Sexton, Peter Campbell – Anne Murray: What a Wonderful World (Eagle Rock Entertainment)

== Best Sound in an Information/Documentary Program or Series ==
- Peter Sawade, Eric Apps, Elma Belo, Alison Clark, Steve Hammond, Dino Pigat – Legacy of Terror: The Bombing of Air India (Bishari Films, TVOntario)
- Hennie Britton, Gael MacLean, Eric Harwood Davies – Jeni LeGon: Living in a Great Big Way (NFB)
- Dwayne Newman, Dante Winkler – Machine Gun: History Down the Barrel of a Gun – The Gun Comes Home Then Goes to War Again (Discovery Channel/High Road Productions)
- Rusty Dunn, Ewan Deane, Chris Ove, Hans Fousek – Murder in Normandy (Paperny Entertainment)
- Paul Durand, Elma Bello, Eric Apps, Peter Sawade, Dino Pigat, Marina Adam – Out of the Fire (Bishari Films)
- Lewis Cohen, Edouard Dumoulin, Jean-Charles Deshaies, Luc Bourgeois – Road Stories for the Flesh Eating Future (Galafilm)

== Best Original Music Score for a Program or Mini-series ==
- Michel Cusson – Dr. Lucille: The Lucille Teasdale Story (TVA International/Motion International/Ballistic Pictures)
- Robert Carli – External Affairs (Shaftesbury Films/Alliance Atlantis)
- Denis Larochelle – The Legend of Sleepy Hollow (Muse Entertainment, Hallmark Entertainment)
- Mark Korven – The Sheldon Kennedy Story (Alberta Filmworks/Sarrazin Couture Entertainment)
- Tim McCauley – Trial By Fire (Alberta Filmworks/Canadian Broadcasting Corporation)

== Best Original Music Score for a Dramatic Series ==
- John Van Tongeren – The Outer Limits (Alliance Atlantis/Atlantis Films/Showtime Networks/Trilogy Entertainment)
- Daniel Scott, Paul Baraka – Bob Morane (Cactus Animation/Ellipsanime)
- Maribeth Solomon, Micky Erbe – Earth: Final Conflict (Atlantis Films)
- Jack Semple, Rob Bryanton – Incredible Story Studios (Mind's Eye Entertainment/Vérité Films)
- Bob Wiseman – Twitch City (Shadow Shows/Accent Entertainment/CBC)

== Best Original Music Score for a Documentary Program or Series ==
- Terry Frewer – Over Canada (Gary McCartie Productions)
- Lance Neveu – Fire and Ice: The Rocket Richard Riot (Barna-Alper Productions/Galafilm)
- Glenn Morley – Life and Times – Stephen Leacock- 90th Parallel Productions/CBC)
- Brian Wall – Out of the Fire (Bishari Films)
- Longo Hai, Ben Johannesen, Geoff Bennett – The Secret World of Gardens (Bullfrog Films)

== Special awards ==
- Gordon Sinclair Award For Broadcast Journalism – Ron Haggart
- John Drainie Award – Shelagh Rogers
- Earle Grey Award – Air Farce Live (CBC)
- Margaret Collier Award – Robert Forsyth
- Gemini Award for Outstanding Technical Achievement – SkyCable of Manitoba
- Canada Award – Karen King, Jari Osborne – Unwanted Soldiers (NFB
- Academy Achievement Award – Pat Ferns
- Viewer's Choice Award for Lifestyle Host – Air Farce Live (CBC
- Gemini Award for Most Popular Website Competition – Raja Khanna, Matt O'Sullivan, Michael Prini – Savoir Faire Specials (Primevista Television)
