= Hot Docs Award for Best Canadian Feature Documentary =

Canadian documentary film award

The Hot Docs Award for Best Canadian Feature Documentary is an annual Canadian film award, presented by the Hot Docs Canadian International Documentary Festival to the film selected by jury members as the year's best Canadian feature film in the festival program. The award was presented for the first time in 1998; prior to that year, awards were presented in various genre categories, but no special distinction for Canadian films was presented. The award is sponsored by the Documentary Organization of Canada and Telefilm Canada, and carries a cash prize of $10,000.

In 2001, the festival presented both "gold" and "silver" medals in the category, although this structure was not retained in future years.

In most years, the festival also presents a Special Jury Prize to a Canadian feature documentary which was not the primary winner of the main award, but still features some award-worthy aspect such as narrative or technical innovation. The Special Jury Prize is sponsored by the Directors Guild of Canada and its Ontario chapter, and carries a $5,000 cash prize.

== Winners ==
=== Best Canadian Feature Documentary ===
Year	Film	Filmmaker(s)	Ref
1998	Chile, Obstinate Memory (Chile, la memoria obstinada)	Patricio Guzmán	
1999	Hitman Hart: Wrestling with Shadows	Paul Jay	
2000	The Holier It Gets	Jennifer Baichwal	
2001	My Left Breast Gold	Gerry Rogers	
2001	Out of the Fire Silver	Shelley Saywell	
2002	The Fiancée of Life (La fiancée de la vie)	Carole Laganière	
2003	Rage Against the Darkness	John Kastner	
2004	Army of One	Sarah Goodman	
2005	Hogtown: The Politics of Policing	Min Sook Lee	
2006	Martyr Street	Shelley Saywell	
2007	The Bodybuilder and I	Bryan Friedman	
2008	Flicker	Nik Sheehan	
2009	Invisible City	Hubert Davis	
2010	In the Name of the Family	Shelley Saywell	
2011	Family Portrait in Black and White	Julia Ivanova	
2012	The World Before Her	Nisha Pahuja	
2013	When I Walk	Jason DaSilva	
2014	Out of Mind, Out of Sight	John Kastner	
2015	Haida Gwaii: On the Edge of the World	Charles Wilkinson	
2016	Koneline: Our Land Beautiful	Nettie Wild	
2017	Unarmed Verses	Charles Officer	
2018	A Little Wisdom	Yuqi Kang	
2019	Nîpawistamâsowin: We Will Stand Up	Tasha Hubbard	
2020	Prayer for a Lost Mitten (Prière pour une mitaine perdue)	Jean-François Lesage	
2021	Zo Reken	Emanuel Licha	
2022	Geographies of Solitude	Jacquelyn Mills	
2023	I Lost My Mom (J'ai placé ma mère)	Denys Desjardins	
2024	The Soldier's Lagoon	Pablo Álvarez Mesa	
2025	Agatha's Almanac	Amalie Atkins	
2026	Saigon Story: Two Shootings in the Forest Kingdom	Kim Nguyen	

=== Special Jury Prize ===
Year	Film	Filmmaker(s)	Ref
2003	The Last Round: Chuvalo vs. Ali	Joseph Blasioli	
2004	Continuous Journey	Ali Kazimi	
2005	No award		
2006	Mystic Ball	Greg Hamilton	
2007	Driven by Dreams (À force de rêves)	Serge Giguère	
2008	Junior	Isabelle Lavigne	
2009	Waterlife	Kevin McMahon	
2010	Leave Them Laughing	John Zaritsky	
2011	At Night, They Dance	Isabelle Lavigne, Stéphane Thibault	
2011	The Guantanamo Trap	Thomas Wallner	
2012	Peace Out	Charles Wilkinson	
2013	Alphée of the Stars (Alphée des étoiles)	Hugo Latulippe	
2014	Before the Last Curtain Falls	Thomas Wallner	
2015	The Amina Profile	Sophie Deraspe	
2016	The Prison in Twelve Landscapes	Brett Story	
2017	Resurrecting Hassan	Carlo Guillermo Proto	
2018	What Walaa Wants	Christy Garland	
2019	Prey	Matt Gallagher	
2020	Stateless	Michèle Stephenson	
2021	One of Ours	Yasmine Mathurin	
2022	Rojek	Zaynê Akyol	
2023	Caiti Blues	Justine Harbonnier	
2024	Any Other Way: The Jackie Shane Story	Michael Mabbott, Lucah Rosenberg-Lee	
2025	Paul	Denis Côté	
2026	Ceremony	Banchi Hanuse	
