= Maddicott =

Maddicott is a surname. Notable people with the surname include:

- John Maddicott (born 1943), English historian
- Dan Maddicott (fl. 2000), British children's television producer
