= Out of Mind, Out of Sight (film) =

- Written by: John Kastner
- Directed by: John Kastner
- Music by: Bruce Fowler
- Country of origin: Canada
- Original language: English

Production
- Producer: John Kastner
- Editor: Michael Hannan
- Running time: 56 minutes
- Production company: J.S. Kastner Productions Ltd.

Original release
- Network: TVOntario
- Release: May 7, 2014

Out of Mind, Out of Sight is a 2014 Canadian documentary film by John Kastner at the Brockville Mental Health Centre. The film concentrates on two floors of the Brockville facility devoted to forensic psychiatry.

Over 18 months, Kastner filmed 46 of the 59 patients on the floors, as well as 75 staff members. The film was shot at the Centre at the same time as Kastner was shooting his 2013 film, NCR: Not Criminally Responsible, exploring the personal impact of the mental disorder defence in Canada.

Out of Mind, Out of Sight was co-produced by J.S. Kastner Prods. and the National Film Board of Canada in association with TVOntario, and had its world broadcast premiere on TVO on May 7, 2014.

== Synopsis ==
The documentary analyzes four residents of the Brockville Mental Health Centre, an institution specializing in forensic psychiatrics associated with patients involved in violent crimes. The two men and two women of the film fight stigma surrounding mental illness to regain control of their lives. Patients attending these institutions often disappear from public eye, and their stories go untold.

== Critical reception ==
The film was named Best Canadian Feature Documentary at the Hot Docs Canadian International Documentary Festival.

Writer Michael Thomas from Digital Journal said "Out of Mind, Out of Sight covers nearly every topic one could think of about mental hospitals — what kind of medication do they have, and how often? Do romantic relationships happen on the premises? How are these people treated? Do they have the potential to become violent? All of these questions are answered" and "Despite the grim subject matter, there is some warmth and humour to be found."
