= Ben Grossman =

- Born: Canada
- Genres: Folk, experimental, early music, fusion
- Occupation: Musician
- Instruments: Hurdy-gurdy, percussion, electronics
- Years active: 1995–present
- Labels: Quinlan Road, Echodiscs, Learig Music, Verve Records, DTS Entertainment. etc.
- Website: macrophone.org

Ben Grossman is a Canadian hurdy-gurdy player, percussionist, composer and improviser. He performs both as a soloist and as part of various ensembles. Ben's work is featured on over 100 CDs. He has also been recorded for film soundtracks, radio dramas, as well as for television shows and commercials.

Grossman composed music for the award-winning short film Perfectly a Strangeness, and was part of the music team awarded the 2005 Golden Sheaf Award in the Best Original Music Non-Fiction category for the Ali Kazimi film, Continuous Journey. He has performed live with the Toronto Consort, Ensemble Polaris, La Nef, BT, Loreena McKennitt, (amongst others) and in various solo and ensemble improvisational events. Grossman's first solo album, Macrophone was released in 2007 and features a unique two CD form for simultaneous, aleatoric playback.

Grossman has studied hurdy-gurdy with Valentin Clastrier, Matthias Loibner, Maxou Heintzan, and Simon Wascher. He currently focuses on his efforts in applying the hurdy-gurdy to early, traditional, experimental and ambient music. His goal is to explore the wide range of sound possibilities of this acoustic synthesizer.

== Discography ==
Solo

- Macrophone (2007)
- Live at the Guelph Jazz Festival (recorded 2012, released 2019)
- organistrum:prototype (released 2020)
- isolation etudes vol. 1 (released 2021)
