= Faye Schulman =

Polish Holocaust survivor (1919–2021)

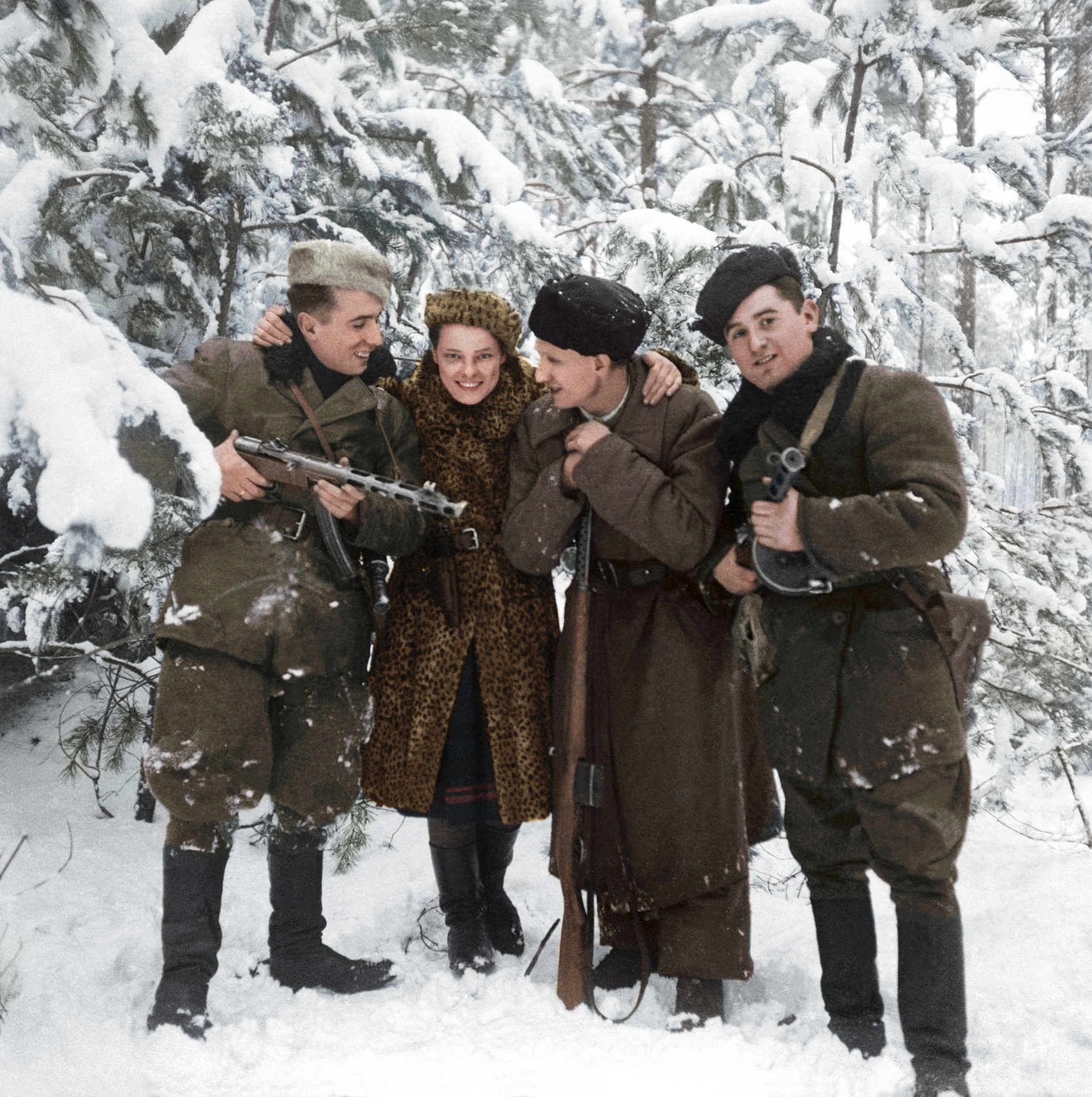
- Faye Schulman with Soviet partisans
- Born: Faigel Lazebnik; 28 November 1919; Sosnkowicze, Polesie Voivodeship, Second Polish Republic
- Died: 24 April 2021 (aged 101); Toronto, Ontario, Canada

Faye Schulman (28 November 1919 – 24 April 2021) was a Jewish partisan photographer, and the only such photographer to photograph their struggle in Eastern Europe during World War II. Her full name was Faigel "Faye" Lazebnik Schulman.

== Early life ==
Schulman was born Faigel Lazebnik on November 28, 1919, in Sosnkowicze, Poland (now Lenin in Western Belarus) as the fifth of seven children born to Yakov and Rayzel (née Migdalovich) Lazebnik, Orthodox Jews. At age 10, Faye was apprenticed to her brother, Moishe, a photographer, later taking over his studio at the age of 16. She also learned some skills from a brother-in-law who was a physician.

== Surviving the Holocaust ==
After Germany invaded the Soviet Union, Schulman's family was split up, with most of them, including Schulman herself, being imprisoned in the Lenin Ghetto, while two of her brothers were sent to a labor camp. On August 14, 1942, German forces killed 1,850 Jews from the ghetto, sparing only 28 for their skills useful to the Nazis, Schulman among them, due to her photography skills. Shortly after the massacre she was ordered to develop photos by the Nazis, which she made personal copies of in secret. One of these photos was one in which she recognized the faces of some of her family members, dead in a mass grave, which made her determined to join the resistance. About a month after her capture, when Soviet guerrillas attacked the locale, they allowed her to flee with them. She joined the Molotava Brigade which was composed mostly of Soviet prisoners of war who had escaped from German captivity, working as a nurse and soldier for them from September 1942 to July 1944. After a raid of Lenin, she regained her photography equipment, eventually taking over 100 photographs of the Resistance. During her time in the Molotava Brigade, she participated in numerous raids on her old village to restock on supplies. During one of these raids, Schulman ordered her comrades to burn her old house down, so it wasn't left in the hands of the Nazis. When the Red Army liberated Belarus in July 1944, she was reunited with two of her brothers and left the brigade after being introduced to her future husband, Morris Schulman.

About the Soviet partisans, Schulman recalled that "sex was not a major issue in our group. We didn't think in terms of men and women, boys and girls. We treated each other as equals. There were no special privileges for women; we were all partisans and we knew that death in war did not spare anyone. Certainly in battle, there was no differentiation between men and women. All our thoughts were concentrated on defeating the enemy." In her memoir, she told of thievery and drunkenness, of an officer who nearly killed her when she rejected his advances, and of antisemitism, writing: "Because I was Jewish, I had to work twice as hard to be deemed as worthy as the gentile girls. When I worked night and day I was told, 'You are not like a Jewish girl. You are just like the Russian girls.' This was meant to be a compliment." She always replied: "'Yes, but I am Jewish.' My work as a nurse, a photographer and most of all as a soldier was plentiful reason for me to stand tall, to be proud of myself and my heritage."

In spite of those shortcomings, she was grateful to the partisans for their help in defeating the Nazis. About the experience, she wrote: "We all belonged to one brigade. We learned to live together, eat together, fight together and survive together. We also needed to get along with each other. Sometimes it was hard to live through one day, let alone years. There was a strong friendship, cooperation and loyalty amongst most of us and a willingness to help each other. In the forest, connections were made between disparate people. Cold, hunger, stress forced strangers to become like family. We were also comrades in arms, all dealing with the same life-and-death circumstances. Our lives were bonded by the dangerous conditions under which we constantly lived. A special bond, nonetheless, existed among those of us who had experienced similar horrors under the Nazis."

== Post-war ==
In 1944, Faye wed Morris Schulman and lived in Pinsk, Belarus. After the war, the couple stayed in the Landsberg displaced persons camp in Germany, where they helped to smuggle weapons to support Israeli independence. In 1948, they immigrated to Toronto, Canada where she worked in a dress factory and later hand-tinted photographs and painted in oils.

== Legacy and writings ==
- Schulman has been decorated by the Soviet/Belarusian, American and Canadian governments.
- In 1995, she wrote A Partisan's Memoir: Woman of the Holocaust.
- She was later featured in a 1999 PBS documentary, “Daring to Resist: Three Women Face the Holocaust.”
- In 2000 she was the subject of Shelley Saywell's documentary film Out of the Fire.
- In 2022 she was featured in the documentary, "Four Winters: A Story of Jewish Partisan Resistance and Bravery in WW2."

== Personal life ==
Faye was survived by her two children Sidney Schulman and Susan Schulman; six grandchildren Michael, Daniel, Nathan, Rachelle, Matthew, and Steven; and six great-grandchildren.
