= Martyr Street =

2006 Canadian documentary film

- Directed by: Shelley Saywell
- Written by: Shelley Saywell
- Produced by: Shelley Saywell; Deborah Parks
- Cinematography: Michael Grippo
- Edited by: Deborah Palloway
- Music by: David Wall
- Production company: Bishari Film Productions
- Distributed by: History
- Release date: 2006
- Running time: 90 minutes
- Country: Canada
- Language: English

Martyr Street is a Canadian documentary film, directed by Shelley Saywell and released in 2006. The film centres on life in the West Bank through the eyes of two young girls, one Israeli and one Palestinian, living in Hebron.

The film premiered at the 2006 Hot Docs Canadian International Documentary Festival, where it won the Best Canadian Feature Documentary award. It subsequently had its television premiere in July 2006 on History, following which it was a nominee for the Donald Brittain Award for best social or political television documentary at the 22nd Gemini Awards in 2007.
