= Cover Me (Canadian TV series) =

1999 Canadian television miniseries

- Genre: Thriller
- Written by: Peter Lauterman
- Directed by: Stacey Stewart Curtis; Marc F. Voizard
- Starring: Colin Ferguson; Caroline Neron; Jackie Burroughs; Philip Craig; Neville Edwards
- Country of origin: Canada
- No. of seasons: 1
- No. of episodes: 6

Production
- Production companies: Alliance Atlantis Communications; Power Pictures; Serendipity Point Films

Original release
- Network: CBC Television
- Release: 26 September – 28 September 1999

Cover Me is a Canadian television miniseries which aired on CBC Television in 1999. It starred Colin Ferguson, Caroline Neron, Jackie Burroughs and Philip Craig.

== Premise ==
The Ottawa Citizen described the series as, "A clear-eyed, right-wing, steak-and-potatoes Calgary Mountie is teamed up with a tempestuous, sophisticated, chain-smoking Montreal séparatiste, who also happens to be a CSIS agent. They fight international terrorism when not fighting each other."

== Cast ==
- Colin Ferguson as Andrew Chase
- Caroline Neron as Pascale Laurier
- Jackie Burroughs as Caitlin Crawford
- Philip Craig as Gareth Endicott
- Neville Edwards as Malloy

== Production ==
The series was the first production from Serendipity Films, which was formed by Montreal-native Robert Lantos when he sold Alliance to Atlantis to form Alliance Atlantis.

== Reception ==
Richard Helm of The Edmonton Journal described the series as "laughably awful", adding that "...Cover Me also stands as a cautionary tale about what can happen when a broadcaster wades into a populist TV genre with which it's totally unfamiliar."
