= In the Name of the Family =

- Directed by: Shelley Saywell
- Produced by: Habiba Nosheen; Deborah Parks; Shelley Saywell
- Cinematography: Michael Grippo
- Edited by: Deborah Palloway
- Music by: David Wall; Adam B. White
- Production company: Bishari Film Productions
- Release date: May 1, 2010 (Hot Docs)
- Running time: 90 minutes
- Country: Canada
- Language: English

In the Name of the Family is a Canadian documentary film, directed by Shelley Saywell and released in 2010. The film is an exploration of the issue of honor killing, focusing in part on the 2007 murder of Aqsa Parvez.

The film premiered on May 1, 2010 at the Hot Docs Canadian International Documentary Festival, where it won the award for Best Canadian Feature Documentary. It was subsequently a Genie Award nominee for Best Feature Length Documentary at the 31st Genie Awards in 2011.
