= Runaway Grooms =

- Directed by: Ali Kazimi
- Written by: Susan Martin
- Produced by: Ali Kazimi
- Cinematography: Zoe Dirse
- Edited by: Ricardo Acosta
- Production company: Asli Films
- Distributed by: CBC Television
- Release date: April 20, 2005
- Running time: 44 minutes
- Country: Canada
- Language: English

Runaway Grooms is a Canadian documentary film, directed by Ali Kazimi and released in 2005. An examination of the dowry system in India, the film explores the phenomenon of Indo-Canadian men who fraudulently return to India ostensibly seeking women to marry, but then abandon the woman and return to Canada without her as soon as they have secured possession of her dowry.

The film premiered on April 20, 2005, as an episode of CBC Television's documentary series The Passionate Eye.

It won the Donald Brittain Award for Best Social or Political Documentary Program at the 20th Gemini Awards.
