= Dog and Duck (TV series) =

- Genre: Preschool children
- Written by: Jonathan Lloyd
- Directed by: Bob Harvey
- Voices of: Josie Lawrence; James Fleet; John McAndrew; Gary Martin; Eve Karpf
- Composer: John Du Prez
- Country of origin: United Kingdom
- Original language: English
- No. of seasons: 3
- No. of episodes: 195

Production
- Executive producer: Dan Maddicott
- Producer: Tracey Mulcrone
- Production company: United Productions for Meridian

Original release
- Network: ITV (CITV)
- Release: 2000 – 2003

Dog and Duck is a British preschool children's television show that was broadcast on CITV between 2000 and 2003.

== Description ==
Dog and Duck was produced by United Productions, later part of the UNM Group (United News & Media) for Meridian. The show centres on the characters of Dog and Duck, two toys who came alive when their owners were not looking. Other characters in the series included Piano, Telly and Elephant. The show featured a young Carrie Hope Fletcher as Jenny. The series was produced by Tracey Mulcrone and directed by Bob Harvey, with animation from Animated Extras. Josie Lawrence and James Fleet were the voices of Dog and Duck. Dan Maddicott was the executive producer. Jonathan Lloyd was a writer for the show. Other voices included John McAndrew, Eve Karpf, David Holt and Gary Martin. Since 2009, it has had occasional repeats on the CITV channel. There are 195 episodes of 15-minute duration.

== Video release ==
A VHS featuring twelve episodes of Dog and Duck was released by Buena Vista Home Video in 2000, as Dog And Duck - The Best of Friends.
