= Out of the Fire (2000 film) =

- Directed by: Shelley Saywell
- Produced by: Shelley Saywell
- Starring: Faye Schulman
- Edited by: Deborah Palloway
- Music by: Brian Wall
- Production company: Bishari Productions
- Release date: April 27, 2000
- Running time: 56 minutes
- Country: Canada
- Language: English

Out of the Fire is a Canadian documentary film, directed by Shelley Saywell and released in 2000. The film is a portrait of Faye Schulman, a photographer who was one of the most important documentarians of Jewish resistance to the Holocaust, and who later emigrated to Canada following the end of World War II.

The film was broadcast by WTN in April 2000, and was later exhibited theatrically at some Jewish and documentary film festivals.

== Awards ==
Award	Date of ceremony	Category	Recipient	Result	Ref.
Gemini Awards	2000	Best Writing in a Documentary Program or Series	Shelley Saywell	Nominated	
Gemini Awards	2000	Best Picture Editing in a Documentary Program or Series	Deborah Palloway	Nominated	
Gemini Awards	2000	Best Sound in an Information/Documentary Program or Series	Paul Durand, Elma Bello, Eric Apps, Peter Sawade, Dino Pigat, Marina Adam	Nominated	
Gemini Awards	2000	Best Original Music Score for a Documentary Program or Series	Brian Wall	Nominated	
Hot Docs Canadian International Documentary Festival	2001	Best Canadian Feature Documentary	Shelley Saywell	Runner-up	
Yorkton Film Festival	2001	Golden Sheaf Award of Excellence	Shelley Saywell	Won	
Yorkton Film Festival	2001	Best Direction in a Documentary	Shelley Saywell	Won	
Yorkton Film Festival	2001	Best History Documentary	Shelley Saywell	Won	
Yorkton Film Festival	2001	Best Music in a Documentary	Brian Wall	Won	
