= Rage Against the Darkness =

- Directed by: John Kastner
- Screenplay by: John Kastner
- Produced by: John Kastner; Deborah Parks
- Cinematography: Douglas Pike; John Westheuser
- Edited by: Greg West
- Music by: Bruce Fowler
- Production company: J.S. Kastner Productions
- Distributed by: Canadian Broadcasting Corporation
- Release date: May 1, 2003 (Hot Docs)
- Running time: 230 minutes
- Country: Canada
- Language: English

Rage Against the Darkness is a Canadian documentary film, directed by John Kastner and released in 2003. The film profiles Bunny and Leona, two elderly sisters whose relationship changes radically when they must enter long-term care, but by circumstance are placed in two separate institutions instead of together.

The film was inspired in part by Kastner's mother Rose, who was deeply afraid of having to enter a nursing home before her death in 1983. It was originally commissioned by CBC Television as an episode of the documentary series Witness, although the network found the film so strong that it was instead turned into a standalone short run documentary series. The episode centred on Bunny and Leona screened theatrically, while the television-only episodes profiled the experiences of Gert Stevenson, Phillip Rowley and Helen Beck as they also either lived in or desperately tried to avoid the elder care system.

The film premiered at the 2003 Hot Docs Canadian International Documentary Festival, and the television version was broadcast by CBC Television from September 15 to 19, 2004.

== Awards ==
Award	Date of ceremony	Category	Recipient	Result	Ref.
Hot Docs Canadian International Documentary Festival	2003	Best Canadian Feature Documentary	John Kastner	Won	
Gemini Awards	2005	Donald Brittain Award	John Kastner, Deborah Parks	Nominated	
Gemini Awards	2005	Best Direction in a Documentary Program	John Kastner	Nominated	
Gemini Awards	2005	Best Photography in a Documentary Program or Series	Douglas Pike, John Westheuser	Nominated	
