= Unwanted Soldiers =

- Written by: Jari Osborne
- Directed by: Jari Osborne
- Narrated by: Jari Osborne
- Country of origin: Canada

Production
- Production company: National Film Board of Canada

Original release
- Release: 1999

Unwanted Soldiers is a 1999 made-for-TV documentary film that was written, directed, and narrated by Jari Osborne for the National Film Board of Canada. It won the Canada Award at the 2000 Gemini Awards.

The film tells the story of Osborne's father and other Chinese-Canadian veterans who fought in World War II, documenting a history of discrimination against them and the Chinese-Canadian community in British Columbia. Osborne's father and his compatriots recall their training for clandestine missions behind enemy lines in Southeast Asia, as they fought for a country that had discriminated against them.

== See also ==
- Military history of Asian Americans
