= Caroline Néron =

Canadian actress, singer and fashion designer

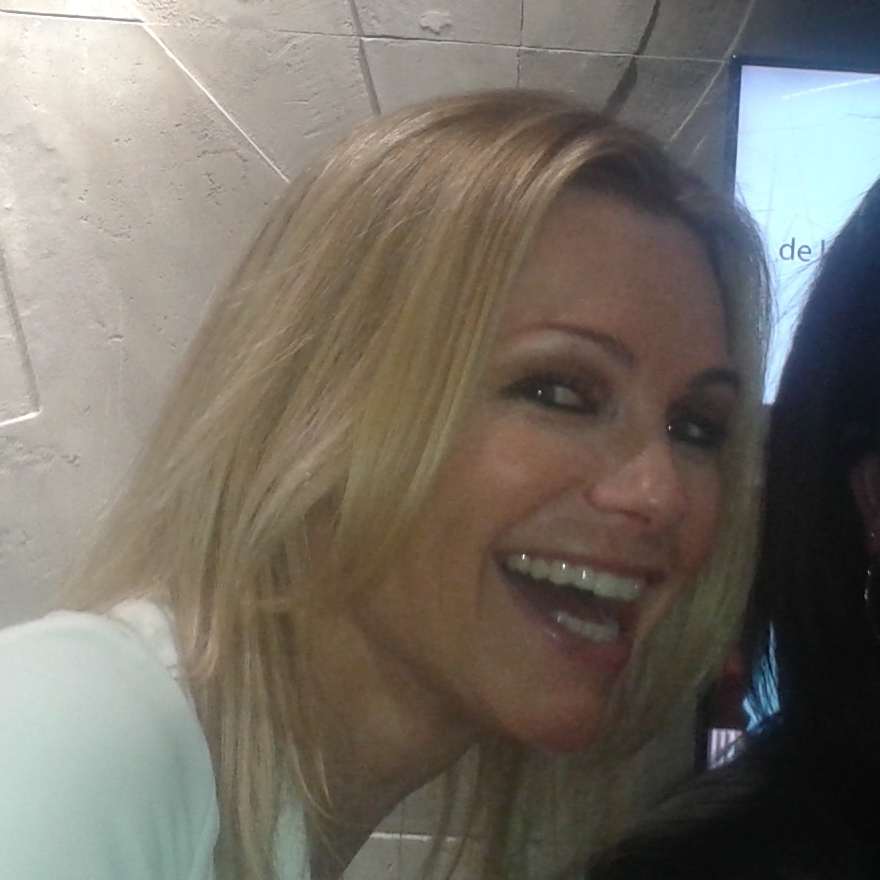
- Néron in 2015
- Born: 1973 (age 51–52); Boucherville, Quebec, Canada
- Occupations: Actress, singer, fashion designer
- Musical career
- Genres: Pop
- Instrument: Vocals
- Website: www.carolineneron.com

Caroline Néron (born July 21, 1973) is a Canadian actress, singer and fashion designer (accessories). She has appeared in a number of roles on television and also on films. She was born in Boucherville, Quebec.

== Filmography ==
She was nominated for "Best Performance by an Actress in a Continuing Leading Dramatic Role" prize in the 2000 Gemini Awards for her role in Cover Me.

=== Television ===
- 1995: Scoop IV (TV series)
- 1995: Zoya: les chemins du destin (TV)
- 1996: Urgence TV series
- 1997: Diva TV series
- 1998: Une voix en or
- 1998: Réseaux (TV series)
- 1999: Cover Me
- 2000: Haute surveillance(TV series)
- 2001: Tribu.com (TV series)
- 2019: District 31 (TV series)
- 2022: Stat (TV series)

=== Cinema ===
- 1992: Coyote in role of Jacynthe
- 1996: Love Me, Love Me Not (J'aime, j'aime pas)
- 1997: Strip Search in lead role
- 1997: The Caretaker's Lodge (La Conciergerie)
- 1998: The Invitation (L'Invitation) in role of Mireille
- 2000: Un petit vent de panique
- 2002: Ice Cold in lead role
- 2003: Seducing Doctor Lewis (La Grande séduction) as voice of Brigitte
- 2004: Eternal in role of Elizabeth Kane
- 2004: C'est pas moi, c'est l'autre
- 2007: Days of Darkness (L'Âge des ténèbres) in role of Carole Bigras-Bourque
- 2009: Rise of the Gargoyles in role of Nicole
- 2009: 3 Seasons (3 Saisons) in role of Sacha
- 2020: Goddess of the Fireflies (La déesse des mouches à feu)
- 2023: Testament

== Discography ==
=== Albums ===
- 2003: Caroline Néron
- 2007: Reprogrammé
- 2010: Le Destin

=== Singles / Videos ===
- "Qu'est ce que t'attend?"
- "C'est juste d'lamour"
- "C'est pas la première fois"
- "On en pleure"
- "Colle-toi à moi"
- "Soul Sister"
- "Nos âmes s'appellent"
- "Contre celui que j'aime"
