= NCR: Not Criminally Responsible =

- Directed by: John Kastner
- Written by: John Kastner
- Produced by: John Kastner; Silva Basmajian
- Production company: National Film Board of Canada
- Release date: April 28, 2013 (Hot Docs)
- Running time: 98 minutes
- Country: Canada
- Language: English

NCR: Not Criminally Responsible is a 2013 Canadian documentary film by John Kastner, exploring the effects of the mental disorder defence in Canada, by following the stories of Sean Clifton, who stabbed and badly injured a woman named Julie Bouvier in a shopping mall while he was in a delusional state, and his traumatized victim. It was produced by the National Film Board of Canada.

== Subject ==
Bouvier was stabbed several times outside a shopping mall in Cornwall, Ontario on October 7, 1999 by Clifton, who had waited in the parking lot for the next attractive young woman to walk by. Clifton had been bullied at school and found it hard to develop a relationship with any girls. He was arrested and later diagnosed as a paranoid schizophrenic with obsessive compulsive disorder. He was determined to be suffering from a mental disorder that made him unfit for trial.

The film includes scenes inside the Brockville Mental Health Centre, where Clifton was confined for treatment including therapy. It also explores his life after release, using medication and becoming re-integrated into society.

== Release ==
The film was premiered at the April 2013 Hot Docs Canadian International Documentary Festival. In September 2013, Kastner screened the film at the annual conference of the Canadian Psychiatric Association.

The film first aired to a wider audience on CBC TV's Doc Zone, in a shortened version on October 17, 2013. The full-length version aired on October 20 on CBC’s Documentary Channel. The film is available on the NFB.ca website for download or on DVD.

Although the victim of Clifton's attack had agreed to be filmed in the documentary only if her face were partially concealed in order to maintain her safety and privacy, she agreed to appear at the film's premiere in April 2013. She took questions from the audience and for the first time allowed her photo to be taken and published, by the Toronto Star. She has accepted an apology from her attacker.

A sequel, called Not Criminally Responsible: Wedding Secrets, was released in 2016 as an episode of CBC Docs POV. The sequel centres on the wedding of Jon McMahon, Clifton's estranged son with whom he was reunited after the broadcast of the original film, to Nicole Rogers, an associate producer of the film, and on Clifton's attempts to apologize and make amends to the victim of his attack, which have taken on new urgency because they have both been invited to the wedding.
