= The Life (2004 film) =

- Written by: Alan Di Fiore; Chris Haddock
- Directed by: Lynne Stopkewich
- Starring: Bruce Greenwood; Ian Tracey
- Country of origin: Canada
- Original language: English

Production
- Running time: 92 min.

Original release
- Release: 2004

The Life is a 2004 Canadian drama television film directed by Lynne Stopkewich and written by Alan Di Fiore and Chris Haddock. Set in Vancouver’s Downtown Eastside, the film follows two police officers who begin documenting the lives of people with drug addiction whom they encounter while working their beat.

== Cast ==
- Bruce Greenwood as Arnie
- Brian Markinson as Tony
- Ian Tracey as Matt
- Terry Chen as Daryl
- Nancy Sivak as Rose
- Alisen Down as Crystal
- Katharine Isabelle as Amber Reilly
- Rhys Huber as Student 1
