= Real Renos =

The Real Renos Show was a home improvement television show that aired from 2003-2009 and starred Jim Caruk, who later went on to Builder Boss. In addition to the Canadian HGTV, it also aired on The DIY Network and ran for seven seasons showcasing home renovations from the contractor's perspective.
