= The View from Here (TV series) =

Canadian television series

The View from Here is a Canadian television series, which airs on TVOntario. Hosted by Ian Brown, the program airs documentary films.

The series debuted on January 11, 1995, with its debut episode featuring the film Fiction and Other Truths: A Film About Jane Rule.

The series is a frequent nominee for Best Documentary Series at the Gemini Awards, and won the award in 1999 and 2000.
