= Shelley Saywell =

Canadian filmmaker

Shelley Saywell is an Emmy Award-winning Canadian documentary filmmaker. A two-time winner of the Hot Docs Award for Best Canadian Feature Documentary, her films are focused on issues of social justice and conflict, with a particular emphasis on women and children. Her films have been officially selected by numerous international festivals and broadcast in more than 30 countries. Saywell has been personally honoured with an Award for Creative Excellence, by Women in Film and Television, and UNESCO's Gandhi Medal for the Promotion of Peace. Her complete collection of research, footage, photographs, and transcripts is now held by the University of Toronto, Media Commons Archives.

Saywell is author of the upcoming “If Only Love, A Memoir of Second Chances,” Random House Canada, publication date spring 2026. Women in War:First Hand Accounts from World War II to El Salvador, Penguin Viking, 1986, contributing editor, Ourselves Among Others, St Martins Press, 1988

She was co-founder with Deborah Parks of Bishari Films. Saying it Very Well, POV magazine, 2003, Hot Docs, Director in Focus, 2003

== Filmography ==
- 1988 - Shahira: Nomads of the Sahara
- 1994 - No Man's Land
- 1995 - Fire and Water
- 1007 - Rape: A Crime of War
- 1997 - Kim's Story: The Road from Vietnam
- 1999 - Hamas: Behind the Mask
- 1999 - Legacy of Terror: The Bombing of Air India
- 1999 - Crimes of Honor
- 2000 - Out of the Fire
- 2001 - A Child's Century of War
- 2002 - Street Nurse
- 2003 - A Generation of Hate
- 2004 - Angry Girls
- 2006 - Martyr Street
- 2008 - Devil's Bargain: A Journey into the Small Arms Trade
- 2010 - The Nanny Business
- 2010 - In the Name of the Family
- 2015 - Lowdown Tracks
- 2016 - The War at Home

== Awards ==
Award	Year	Category	Film	Result	Ref(s)
Canadian Screen Awards	2017	Best Writing in a Documentary	The War at Home	Nominated	
Canadian Screen Awards	2017	Donald Brittain Award	The War at Home	Nominated	
Gemini Awards	1995	Donald Brittain Award	No Man's Land	Nominated	
Gemini Awards	1995	Best Writing in an Information/Documentary Program or Series	No Man's Land	Nominated	
Gemini Awards	1997	Donald Brittain Award	Fire and Water	Nominated	
Gemini Awards	1997	Best Direction in a Documentary Program or Series	Fire and Water	Nominated	
Gemini Awards	1998	Best Direction in a Documentary Program or Series	Everyman - Kim's Story: The Road From Vietnam	Won	
Gemini Awards	1998	Best Direction in a Documentary Program or Series	Everyman - Kim's Story: The Road From Vietnam	Won	
Gemini Awards	1999	Donald Brittain Award	Crimes of Honour	Won	
Gemini Awards	2000	Donald Brittain Award	Legacy of Terror: The Bombing of Air India	Nominated	
Gemini Awards	2000	Best Direction in a Documentary Program	Legacy of Terror: The Bombing of Air India	Nominated	
Gemini Awards	2000	Best Writing in a Documentary Program	Legacy of Terror: The Bombing of Air India	Nominated	
Gemini Awards	2000	Best Writing in a Documentary Program	Out of the Fire	Nominated	
Gemini Awards	2003	Best Writing in a Documentary Program or Series	A Child's Century of War	Nominated	
Gemini Awards	2005	Best Children's or Youth Non-Fiction Program or Series	Angry Girls	Nominated	
Gemini Awards	2007	Donald Brittain Award	Martyr Street	Nominated	
Gemini Awards	2007	Best Direction in a Documentary Program	Martyr Street	Nominated	
Gemini Awards	2011	Best Direction in a News Information Program or Series	The Nanny Business	Nominated	
Genie Awards	2011	Best Feature Length Documentary	In the Name of the Family	Nominated	
Hot Docs Canadian International Documentary Festival	2001	Best Canadian Feature Documentary	Out of the Fire	Runner-up	
Hot Docs Canadian International Documentary Festival	2006	Best Canadian Feature Documentary	Martyr Street	Won	
Hot Docs Canadian International Documentary Festival	2010	Best Canadian Feature Documentary	In the Name of the Family	Won	
