= Through a Blue Lens =

- Directed by: Veronica Alice Mannix
- Produced by: Gillian Darling-Kovanic
- Production company: National Film Board of Canada
- Release date: 1999
- Running time: 52 minutes
- Country: Canada

Through a Blue Lens is a Canadian documentary film produced by the National Film Board of Canada. The film follows interactions between police officers and drug addicts and documents the extreme poverty and suffering many addicts endure.

== Production ==
Through a Blue Lens was produced by the National Film Board of Canada and directed by Veronica Alice Mannix. It was shot in Vancouver's Downtown Eastside. The film is 52 minutes in length and incorporates 22 minutes of footage shot by a group of Vancouver Police Officers called The Odd Squad Productions Society.

== Description ==
This award-winning documentary film, shot in Vancouver, British Columbia, Canada’s notorious Downtown Eastside, caught the eyes of audiences, film makers and critics worldwide for its unusual and sensitive depiction of life on the street.

Through A Blue Lens documents a year of life and death on the street and behind tenement walls. A striking aspect of the film is not only the horror of drug abuse but the story of how the interaction between the police and the people who are living with complex substance abuse and mental health diagnoses, with the camera as a catalyst, actually changed the people involved. The cops became more sympathetic to the people on the street and their complex barriers to care, in having friendship extended to them by the police and film makers, developed self-esteem and, in some cases, actually were able to move towards recovery.

This documentary was made during the height of the then unpublished scandal of the missing women in downtown Vancouver. At least one of the women who appears on camera named April Reoch was later identified was thought to be one of the victims. She died on Christmas Day of 2000. It was later discovered that she was murdered by Ian Mathieson Rowe, and not by Robert Pickton.

== Awards ==
- Japan Prize (2000) (Tokyo) Category: Adult Education winner
- Chris Award (2000) (Columbus, Ohio) Category: Social Issues
- Reel 2 Real International Film Festival (2000) (Vancouver): Award for Most Inspirational Short film or Video - given by the Youth Jury

== Origin ==
While the Mannix team was filming their previous documentary, Down Here, they met two officers who had something to say about the gentrification of the Downtown Eastside. The officers had been using still cameras to document many of the circumstances people suffered and took these images to local schools to educate youth.

The Mannix’s were asked by the officers to teach them to use a video camera, so they started by teaching camera handling, camera ethics and power relationships. Following videotaping, the officers would leave the video tapes with Veronica Mannix for screening and comments. Her comments would include direction on follow-up with specific participants. It was during this time that Veronica's vision formed of the relationship of these two unlikely groups of people coming together to try to make a difference. She pitched the story and the National Film Board supported her vision. Veronica used 22 minutes of the officers' 100 hours of videotape; the remainder of the footage was shot by Daniel Mannix as directed by Veronica. Through a Blue Lens started out with seven police officers and nineteen drug users. The final participants included four officers and six drug users.

== Additional credits ==
The NFB producer is Gillian Darling Kovanic with Daniel C. Mannix as director of photography. The editor is Shelly Hamer. Running time is 52 minutes.

== Follow-Up ==
An official follow-up titled Tears For April: Beyond The Blue Lens (2007), re-introduces the late April Reoch and focuses directly on her struggles with addiction until the discovery of her body on Christmas Day, 2000. Reoch's son Daniel, is also featured in this documentary. The other five users from the previous documentary have made appearances with updated details. Randy Miller, a former user, has successfully stayed sober since 2000 (Miller later had a series of strokes and still lives in New Westminster with his common-law wife Deb). Co-director Al Arsenault, a retired police officer experienced in martial arts, chronicles his experiences with April before her death.

Tears For April: Beyond The Blue Lens was independently produced by The Odd Squad Productions Society. It is co-directed by Al Arsenault and Ken Jubenvill, with writing by Steve Berry.

== Related Films ==
- Flipping the World - Drugs Through a Blue Lens (2000) (30 min)
  - Directed by Moira Simpson
  - Produced for the NFB by Gillian Darling Kovanic & George Johnson
- Through a Clear Lens (2001, Headlines Theatre) - Inspired by The Odd Squad's work.
