= Intimate and Interactive =

Television series

- Country of origin: Canada
- Original language: English

Production
- Running time: 90 minutes

Original release
- Network: MuchMusic
- Release: 1991

Intimate and Interactive is a television program which aired on the Canadian channel MuchMusic. The show was not a regularly scheduled program, but aired on average three or four times a year, and featured contemporary artists live in concert at the CHUM-City Building. There is another version of the show on their sister station, MuchMoreMusic.

The series featured live concert performances by artists, commonly but not exclusively Canadian, in the MuchMusic studio, along with segments in which studio audience members and home viewers via telephone were given the opportunity to ask questions of the performers.

Intimate and Interactive first aired in 1991, with its inaugural episode featuring Bruce Cockburn. Media critics singled out the fact that the show was produced and aired live and its interactive aspects as key points of distinction from MTV's contemporaneous MTV Unplugged series.

Artists who have performed on the program include Joni Mitchell, Blind Melon, Barenaked Ladies, Madonna The Tragically Hip, Alanis Morissette, Meat Loaf, Coldplay, Destiny's Child, Shaggy, Evanescence, Cowboy Junkies, Green Day, Daniel Lanois, Simple Plan, Sloan, Sum 41, Silverchair, Foo Fighters, The Moffatts, Christina Aguilera, Backstreet Boys, Blue Rodeo, Kim Mitchell, Mary J. Blige, Spirit of the West, No Doubt, Spice Girls, Sarah McLachlan, Nickelback, Def Leppard, Bryan Adams, Billy Talent and Avril Lavigne.

The show no longer airs on Much's linear channel, due to it dropping almost all music-related programming to become a general youth-oriented entertainment service. However, the series was relaunched in 2021 as an occasional web series on Much's social networking channels.
