= John Kastner (filmmaker) =

Canadian filmmaker (1946–2019)

John Kastner (April 6, 1946 – November 21, 2019) was a four-time Emmy Award-winning Canadian documentary filmmaker whose later work focused on the Canadian criminal justice system. His films included the documentaries Out of Mind, Out of Sight (2014), a film about patients at the Brockville Mental Health Centre, named best Canadian feature documentary at the Hot Docs Canadian International Documentary Festival; NCR: Not Criminally Responsible (2013), exploring the personal impact of the mental disorder defence in Canada; Life with Murder (2010), The Lifer and the Lady and Parole Dance, and the 1986 made-for-television drama Turning to Stone, set in the Prison for Women in Kingston, Ontario.

== Filmography ==
=== Director ===
- Sharing the Secret (1981)
- The Lifer and the Lady (1984)
- Hunting Bobby Oatway (1997)
- Rage Against the Darkness (2004)
- Monster in the Family (2007)
- Life with Murder (2010)
- NCR: Not Criminally Responsible (2013)
- Out of Mind, Out of Sight (2014)
- Not Criminally Responsible: Wedding Secrets (2016)

== Non-documentary work ==
Early in his career, Kastner occasionally took a break from making documentary films on serious topics with lighter fare, which included co-hosting a short-lived children's series for CTV in the early 1980s, Just Kidding, as well as doing comedy segments for the CBC-TV late-night talk show 90 Minutes Live.

In 1986, he produced the dramatic television film Turning to Stone, adapted from some of the interviews with women prisoners he had conducted while making The Parole Dance and The Lifer and the Lady.

A child actor, Kastner's first screenwriting credit came in 1983, when he co-wrote The Terry Fox Story, starring Robert Duvall.

== Awards and honours ==
Kastner won four Emmy Awards. He won International Emmys for his 1978 film Four Women, a look at breast cancer for the CBC-TV investigative news series The Fifth Estate; the 1980 documentary Fighting Back, about young people with leukemia; and the 2011 film Life With Murder. He also received a News & Documentary Emmy Award for The Lifer and the Lady.

Life with Murder also won the Donald Brittain Award for best social/political documentary at the 2011 Gemini Awards, a Special Jury Prize at the Houston Worldfest Film Festival and the awards for Best Political Documentary and Special Achievement in Directing at the Chicago International Film Festival.

=== Lifetime achievement awards ===
Kastner received the Academy Achievement Award at the 22nd annual Gemini Awards, for his contributions to Canadian television journalism. In 2012, he was the subject of a "Focus On" retrospective at the Hot Docs Canadian International Documentary Festival.

== Personal life ==
He was the brother of actor Peter Kastner. Their nephew Jamie Kastner is also a documentary filmmaker.
