= Continuous Journey =

- Directed by: Ali Kazimi
- Written by: Ali Kazimi
- Produced by: Ali Kazimi
- Narrated by: Ali Kazimi
- Cinematography: Ali Kazimi
- Edited by: Graeme Ball; Ali Kazimi
- Music by: Philip Strong
- Production company: Peripheral Visions
- Distributed by: TVOntario
- Release date: October 1, 2004
- Running time: 87 minutes
- Country: Canada
- Language: English

Continuous Journey is a 2004 documentary film directed by Indian-Canadian film-maker Ali Kazimi. The film chronicles the events that took place during the 1914 voyage of the Komagata Maru.

== Summary ==
In 1914, a Singapore-based Sikh known as Baba Gurdit Singh took the SS Komagata Maru on a voyage to transport Indian immigrants over to Canada. On May 23, 1914, the Japanese ship arrived in Vancouver with 376 passengers: 340 Sikhs, 24 Muslims, and 12 Hindus. Feeling confident due to a great portion of the men having war relations to the British Indian Army, Gurdit Sing soon realized that it wasn't so easy for his men to live in Canada. This was due to an act they weren't yet aware of: the continuous journey regulation of 1908, which excluded Indians and South Asians from being able to enter the country.

== Reception ==
Continuous Journey was screened at many festivals upon its release in 2004. Following its premier, the film won various awards including the Best Documentary Feature Audience Award at the 23rd San Francisco International Asian American Film Festival and also won second place for the Audience Award along with an honorable mention for Best Director both at Hot Docs 2004.

The documentary garnered many positive reviews from critics. Canadian documentary director Peter Wintonick wrote in an issue of Point of View on the film's brilliance and stated "rarely has a documentary been so beautifully directed and rendered, shot for shot, image by image, pan by pan, zoom by zoom." Ali Kazimi's knowledge of the events depicted in the film was adored by Susan Walker of Toronto Star as she commented "Kazimi has gone at the incident from every angle.... (His) interviews with historians both in Canada and India provide a rich context for the fate of the 375 rejected immigrants."

== See also ==
List of documentary films

List of Canadian directors

List of racism-related films
