= Ali Kazimi =

Indian-born Canadian film director

Ali Kazimi D.Litt. (born 1961) is an Indo-Canadian filmmaker, media artist and writer.

== Early life and education ==
Born, raised and educated in India, Kazimi attended St. Columba's School and graduated from St. Stephen's College, Delhi University in 1982. He was awarded a scholarship to study film production at York University in Toronto, Canada, in 1983 and graduated with BFA (honours) from the Department of Film in 1987. He joined the Department of Film, as a full-time faculty member in 2006 and served as the chair of what is now known as the Department of Cinema and Media Arts from 2015 to 2016.

== Films ==
Kazimi has created a critically acclaimed body of work dealing with issues of race, immigration, history and social justice. His films have won more than thirty awards and nominations including the Gemini Award, Golden Conch (MIFF 2006), Gold Plaque (Chicago International Film Festival, 1995), Golden Gate Award, (San Francisco International Film Festival, 1995) and Best Director Award (Hot Docs Canadian International Documentary Festival, 1995).

== Honours ==
Kazimi was named the Best Documentarian in Toronto by NOW Magazine's Best of Toronto 2005.

In 2019, Kazimi was one of 8 recipients of the Governor General's Award in Visual and Media Arts – "Kazimi's lovingly rendered and profoundly insightful works demonstrate a deep-rooted empathy for his subjects, a singular cinematic eye, and an unflinching commitment to shedding light on difficult truths." The same year he also received an honorary degree, D.Litt. honoris causa from the University of British Columbia.

He was elected as a Senior Fellow of Massey College in 2021 and as Fellow of the Royal Society of Canada in 2023.

In May 2025, he became the fourth recipient of the Fire Horse Award given by the Toronto Reel Asian Film Festival.

== Films ==
- Narmada: A Valley Rises (1994)
- Shooting Indians (1997)
- Some Kind of Arrangement (1998)
- Continuous Journey (2004)
- Runaway Grooms (2005)
- Random Acts of Legacy (2016)
- Beyond Extinction:Sinixt Resurgence (2022)

== Book ==
- Undesirables: White Canada and the Komagata Maru – An Illustrated History (2012)
