= Dan Maddicott =

Children's television produce

Dan Maddicott is a children's television producer. He created and produced the programme Dog and Duck, as well as serving as executive producer for Fungus the Bogeyman, Captain Star and The Worst Witch. Once the Granada director of children's, he established his own production company, Indie Kids, in 2002.
