= 16th Gemini Awards =

2001 awards for Canadian television

- Date: October 29, 2001
- Venue: Metro Toronto Convention Centre
- Hosted by: Mike Bullard

Television/radio coverage
- Network: CBC Television

The Academy of Canadian Cinema & Television's 16th Gemini Awards were held on October 29, 2001, to honour achievements in Canadian television. The awards show, which was hosted by Mike Bullard, took place at the Metro Toronto Convention Centre and was broadcast on CBC Television.

== Best Dramatic Series ==
- Da Vinci's Inquest – Haddock Entertainment, Barna-Alper Productions, Alliance Atlantis Productions, Canadian Broadcasting Corporation. Producers: Chris Haddock, Laszlo Barna, Lynn Barr, Arvi Liimatainen
- Blue Murder – Barna-Alper Productions, Canwest, North Bend Films. Producers: Laszlo Barna, Norman Denver, Steve Lucas
- Drop the Beat – Back Alley Film Productions. Producers: Adrienne Mitchell, Susan Alexander, Janis Lundman, Suzanne Chapman
- The Associates – Alliance Atlantis. Producers: Brian Dennis, Anne Marie La Traverse, Steve Blackman, Greg Ball, Alyson Feltes, Maureen McKeon
- The Outer Limits – Alliance Atlantis, Atlantis Films, Showtime Networks, Trilogy Entertainment. Producers: John Watson, Richard Barton Lewis, Mark Stern, Brent Karl Clackson, Pen Densham, Sam Egan

== Best Dramatic Miniseries ==
- Nuremberg – Alliance Atlantis Communications, CTV Television Network, British American Entertainment, Cypress Films, Les Productions La Fête. Producers: Peter Sussman, Gerald W. Abrams, Alec Baldwin, Mychele Boudrais, Jon Cornick, Suzanne Girard, Ian McDougall
- Haven – Alliance Atlantis Communications, Paulette Breen Productions. Producers: Peter Sussman, Dan Paulson, Mark Winemaker, Paulette Breen
- Revenge of the Land – Bernard Zukerman Productions, Cinar. Producer: Bernard Zukerman

== Best TV Movie ==
- Scorn – Alliance Atlantis Communications, Barna-Alper Productions, Canadian Broadcasting Corporation, Eurasia Motion Pictures, Face to Face Media Society, Kinetic Productions. Producers: Christian Bruyere, Laszlo Barna, Maryke McEwen
- Blessed Stranger: After Flight 111 – Big Motion Pictures, CTV Television Network, Salter Street Films. Producers: Wayne Grigsby, David MacLeod
- Chasing Cain – Canadian Broadcasting Corporation, Salter Street Films. Producers: Michael Donovan, Bernard Zukerman, Jerry Ciccoritti
- Lucky Girl – Alliance Atlantis Communications, Triptych Media. Producers: Anne Marie La Traverse, Louise Garfield
- The Secret Life of Algernon – Marano Productions, Productions Phare Est. Producer: Nancy Marano

== Best Comedy Program or Series ==
- Made in Canada – Salter Street Films, Island Edge. Producers: Gerald Lunz, Michael Donovan
- John Callahan's Quads! – Nelvana, SBS independent, Animation Works, Media World Features, Film Victoria, ScreenWest, Lotteries Commission of Western Australia. Producers: Judy Malmgren, Michael Hirsh, Clive A. Smith, Marianne Culbert, Patricia R. Burns, Stephen Hodgins, John Tatoulis, John Callahan, Deborah Levin, Patrick Loubert
- Jonovision – Canadian Broadcasting Corporation. Producers: Richard Mortimer, Lynn Harvey
- The Red Green Show – Red Green Productions. Producer: Steve Smith
- This Hour Has 22 Minutes – Salter Street Films, Canadian Broadcasting Corporation. Producers: Michael Donovan, Geoff D’Eon, Jack Kellum, Mark Farrell, Ginny Jones-Duzak

== Best Music, Variety Program or Series ==
- East Coast Music Awards – (East Coast Music Association, CBC Halifax). Producers: Geoff D’Eon, Jac Gautreau, Michael Lewis
- History Bites – The History Channel. Producers: David C. Smith, Rick Green
- Open Mike with Mike Bullard – The Comedy Network. Producers: Sean Tweedley, Sue Brophey, Barbara Bowlby, John Brunton, Al Magee
- YAA! The 11th Annual YTV Achievement Awards – YTV. Producer: Joanne P. Jackson

An additional nomination, for the television special Talking to Americans, was withdrawn at the request of host and producer Rick Mercer due to his belief that humour at the expense of Americans was no longer appropriate in the wake of the September 11 attacks.

== Best Performing Arts Program or Series, or Arts Documentary Program or Series ==
- Great Performances: Don Giovanni Unmasked – Rhombus Media, Thirteen/WNET. Producers: Daniel Iron, Niv Fichman
- A Very Dangerous Pastime: A Devastatingly Simple Dance Guide – National Arts Centre. Producers: Cathy Levy, Allison Lewis, Laura Taler
- Dinner at the Edge – Sienna Films. Producers: Anita Lee, Jennifer Kawaja, Sean Carley, Julia Sereny
- Four Seasons – Rhombus Media, Veronica Tennant Productions. Producers: Daniel Iron, Veronica Tennant
- Life and Times – Studio: The Life & Times of Alex Colville – 90th Parallel Productions, Canadian Broadcasting Corporation. Producers: Andrew Gregg, Gordon Henderson

== Donald Brittain Award for Best Social/Political Documentary Program ==
- Breakaway – A Tale of Two Survivors – Alchemy Notion Pictures. Producers: Mathew Welsh, Johanna Eliot, Johanna Lunn Montgomery
- A Moment in Time: The United Colours of Bronstein – Judy Films. Producer: Judy Jackson
- Witness – Chickens Are People Too – Canadian Broadcasting Corporation. Producers: Charlotte Odele, Marie Natanson, John Kastner, Hilary Armstrong
- In the Shadow of a Saint: The Ken Wiwa Story – Nomad Films. Producers: Stephen Milton, Mark Johnston
- Kim Campbell: Through the Looking Glass – National Film Board of Canada. Producer: Silva Basmajian

== Best Documentary Series ==
- Canada: A People's History – Canadian Broadcasting Corporation. Producers: Mark Starowicz, Hubert Gendron, Gordon Henderson (CBC)
- Witness – Canadian Broadcasting Corporation. Marie Natanson, Charlotte Odele, Hilary Armstrong
- Life's Little Miracles – Breakthrough Entertainment, Canadian Broadcasting Corporation, Slice. Producers: Kirsten Scollie, Ira Levy, Peter Williamson, Ron Singer
- Rainmakers – Adobe Productions. Producers: Robbie Hart, Luc Côté
- The View from Here – TVOntario). Producer: Rudy Buttignol
- Turning Points of History – History Television. Producers: Frank Savoie, Laszlo Barna, Alan Mendelsohn

== Best History/Biography Documentary Program ==
- My Left Breast – Pope Productions. Producer: Paul Pope
- Canada: A People's History – Battle for a Continent – Canadian Broadcasting Corporation. Producers: Mark Starowicz, Sally Reardon
- Life and Times – Todd McFarlane: The Devil You Know – 90th Parallel Productions, CBC Producer: Silva Basmajian
- Life and Times – The Life & Times of Veronica Tennant, Renaissance Woman – 90th Parallel Productions, CBC Producer: Peter Gentile
- Unlucky Lady: The Life and Death of HMCS Athabaskan – History Television. Producer: Wayne Abbott
- W5 – A Life Forgotten – (CTV). Producers: Tom Clark, Anton Koschany, Peter Findlay, Malcolm Fox

== Best Science, Technology, Nature, Environment or Adventure Documentary Program ==
- Nuclear Dynamite – National Film Board of Canada, Canadian Broadcasting Corporation, Telefilm Canada, Face to Face Media. Producers: Gary Marcuse, Betsy Carson, Selwyn Jacob
- Investigative Reports – Criminal Evidence – Kurtis Productions. Producers: Pauline Duffy, Simcha Jacobovici, Roger Pyke, Elliott Halpern, Jack Rabinovitch
- Echoes of the North – Ellis Entertainment. Producers: Ralph C. Ellis, Stephen Ellis
- Insectia – Outlaws – Cinétévé, Pixcom, La Cinquième. Producers: Fabienne Servan-Schreiber, Jacquelin Bouchard, Andre Barro, Mary Armstrong
- Frontiers of Construction – Movers Not Shakers – Ragged Earth Productions, Barna-Alper Productions. Producers: David Langer, Laszlo Barna, Sam Grana, W. James Hogan
- The Nature of Things – The Salmon Forest – Canadian Broadcasting Corporation. Producer: Caroline Underwood

== Best News Information Series ==
- W5 – CTV Television Network. Producers: Malcolm Fox, Anton Koschany
- Venture – Canadian Broadcasting Corporation. Producers: Alan Habbick, Sophia Hadzipetros
- Exhibit A: Secrets of Forensic Science – Kensington Communications. Producers: Robert Sandler, Robert Lang
- Marketplace – Canadian Broadcasting Corporation. Producers: Sharon Hanson, Leslie Peck, Julie Bristow
- Undercurrents – Canadian Broadcasting Corporation. Producers: Pam Bertrand, F.N. Morrison

== Best Newscast/News Special ==
- The National/CBC News – October 2 – Canadian Broadcasting Corporation. Producers: Cynthia Kinch, Mark Harrison, Lynn Kelly, Fred Parker, Jonathan Whitten
- Canada Now – Air India – Canadian Broadcasting Corporation. Producers: Liz Hughes, Wayne Williams
- The National/CBC News – Inside Canada's Prisons – Canadian Broadcasting Corporation. Producers: Stuart Coxe, Cynthia Kinch, Jonathan Whitten, Mark Bulgutch
- CTV National News – Pierre Elliott Trudeau 1919–2000 – CTV News. Producers: Mark Borchiver, Jim Peters
- CTV National News – Summit of the Americas – CTV News. Producers: Margaret Spina, Wendy Freeman

== Best Talk/General Information Series ==
- The NewMusic – MuchMusic. Producer: Tania Natscheff
- That's Hockey – TSN. Producer: Geoff Macht
- Pamela Wallin's Talk TV – Canadian Broadcasting Corporation. Producer: Pamela Wallin
- QT: QueerTelevision – CHUM. Irshad Manji, Moses Znaimer, Marcia Martin
- Vicki Gabereau – Canadian Broadcasting Corporation. Producers: Cynthia Ott, Karen Rapp, Jordan Schwartz

== Best Lifestyle Series ==
- Skin Deep – Inner City Films, Circle Blue Films. Producers: Amos Adetuyi, Alfons Adetuyi
- Debbie Travis’ Painted House – Whalley-Abbey Media Holdings. Producers: Debbie Travis, Hans Rosenstein
- FashionTelevision – CHUM. Producers: Jay Levine, Moses Znaimer, Marcia Martin
- shiftTV – Shift Magazine. Producers: Ian Hannah, Cathie James
- The Great Canadian Food Show – Canadian Broadcasting Corporation. Producer: Chris Knight

== Best Animated Program or Series ==
- Ollie's Under the Bed Adventures – Decode Entertainment, Collideascope Digital Production. Producers: Steven J.P. Comeau, Jessica Andrews, Michael-Andreas Kuttner
- Angela Anaconda – Decode Entertainment/C.O.R.E. Digital Pictures. Producers: Steven DeNure, Neil Court, Joanna Ferrone, John Mariella, Sue Rose, Beth Stevenson, Kym Hyde
- Caillou – Cookie Jar Group, Clockwork Zoo. Producers: Cassandra Schafhausen, Peter Moss, Natalie Dumoulin
- Children of Chelm – Breakthrough Entertainment, Pitchi Poy Animation. Producers: Peter Williamson, Ira Levy
- Franklin – Nelvana. Producers: Clive A. Smith, Michael Hirsh, Patricia R. Burns, Cynthia Taylor, Stephen Hodgins, Marc Minjauw, Paul Hannequart, Patrick Loubert
- Yvon of the Yukon – Studio B Productions, Alliance Atlantis Communications, Corus Entertainment. Producers: Bobby Hsieh, Blair Peters, Chris Bartleman, Tom Pong

== Best Pre-School Program or Series ==
- Sesame Park – Canadian Broadcasting Corporation. Producers: Duncan Lamb, Susan Sheehan, Wendy Smith
- Land O’ Hands – Radical Sheep Productions, Treehouse TV. John Leitch, Rob Mills
- The Nook Counting Network – TVOntario. Producer: Karen Young

== Best Children's or Youth Program or Series ==
- Street Cents – Canadian Broadcasting Corporation. Producers: Barbara Kennedy, Robin Johnston, Susan Rogers
- Caitlin's Way – Riverwood Productions, Fireworks Entertainment, Lynch Entertainment, Nickelodeon. Producers: Jana Veverka, Adam Haight, Helen White, Jay Firestone
- I Was a Sixth Grade Alien – Winklemania Productions, AAC Kids. Producers: Tracey Dodokin, Daphne Ballon, Julie Lacey, Gary Delfiner, Bruce Coville, Maribeth Daley, Ellis Iddon, Philip Meagher
- Incredible Story Studios – Mind's Eye Entertainment, Vérité Films. Producers: Robert de Lint, Virginia Thompson, Kieran Corrigan, Mark Reid, Kevin DeWalt
- Screech Owls – Oasis Pictures, Shaftesbury Films, YTV, Corus Entertainment. Producers: Christina Jennings, Moira Holmes, John May, Suzanne Bolch

== Best Sports Program or Series ==
- Life and Times – Jean Beliveau – 90th Parallel Productions, CBC. Producers: Linda Laughlin, Michael Claydon, Susan Dando
- Sports Journal – CBC Sports. Producers: Brenda Irving, Ken Dodd, Tom Harrington, Claude Panet-Raymond, Terry Walker
- Hockey Day in Canada – Celebrating the Game – CBC Sports. Producers: Chris Irwin, Joel Darling
- Open Ice: Coming of Age – Sportsnet. Producers: Robert MacAskill, Ian Davey
- Too Colourful for the League – Canadian Broadcasting Corporation, Diversus Productions. Producers: Max Wallace, Paul Harrington, Evan Beloff, Ari A. Cohen

== Best Live Sporting Event ==
- The Scott Tournament of Hearts – Canadian Broadcasting Corporation. Producer: Laurence Kimber
- 2000 Summer Olympic Games – Canadian Broadcasting Corporation. Producers: Mike Brannagan, Joel Darling, Terry Ludwick, Don Peppin
- CFL on TSN – Wendy's Friday Night Football: BC at Hamilton – TSN. Producers: Jon Hynes, Rick Chisholm, Paul McLean

== Best Live Special Event Coverage ==
- CBC News Special: Pierre Elliot Trudeau – A Nation Mourns – Canadian Broadcasting Corporation. Producers: Chris Waddell, Mark Bulgutch, Fred Parker
- @discovery.ca – Chris Hadfield: Spacewalker – Discovery Channel. Producers: Alex Bystram, Penny Park, Jane Mingay
- CBC News Special: Federal Election Night – Canadian Broadcasting Corporation. Producers: Fred Parker, Mark Bulgutch, Chris Waddell
- CTV National News – Canadian Alliance Leadership Vote – CTV News. Producers: Joanne MacDonald, Tom Haberstroh
- The Seventh Annual Giller Prize – Bravo!. Producers: Robert Benson, John Gunn

== Best Direction in a Dramatic Program or Miniseries ==
- Jerry Ciccoritti – Chasing Cain (CBC/Salter Street Films)
- Jeremy Podeswa – After the Harvest (Alberta Filmworks/Sarrazin Couture Entertainment/Stornoway Communications)
- David Wellington – Blessed Stranger: After Flight 111 (Big Motion Pictures/CTV/Salter Street Films)
- Yves Simoneau – Nuremberg (Alliance Atlantis/CTV/British American Entertainment/Cypress Films/Les Productions La Fête)
- Sturla Gunnarsson – Scorn (Alliance Atlantis/Barna-Alper Productions/CBC/Eurasia Motion Pictures/Face to Face Media Society/Kinetic Productions)

== Best Direction in a Dramatic Series ==
- Chris Haddock – Da Vinci's Inquest – It's Backwards Day (Haddock Entertainment/Barna-Alper Productions/Alliance Atlantis/CBC)
- Michel Poulette – Bonanno: A Godfather's Story (Armeda/Daniel L. Paulson Productions/Les Productions La Fête)
- Helen Shaver – The Outer Limits (Alliance Atlantis/Atlantis Films/Showtime Networks/Trilogy Entertainment)
- Michael Robison – The Outer Limits (Alliance Atlantis/Atlantis Films/Showtime Networks/Trilogy Entertainment)
- Brent Karl Clackson – The Outer Limits (Alliance Atlantis/Atlantis Films/Showtime Networks/Trilogy Entertainment)

== Best Direction in an Information Program or Series ==
- Matt Cowan – Undercurrents – Teen Rebels (CBC)
- Harvey Crossland – Exhibit A: Secrets of Forensic Science (Kensington Communications)
- Howard Wiseman – Exhibit A: Secrets of Forensic Science (Kensington Communications)
- Nadine Pequeneza – Exhibit A: Secrets of Forensic Science (Kensington Communications)
- David Storey – Pet Project (Animal Planet)
- Gabriela Schonbach – Quiet Places (Omnifilm Entertainment)

== Best Direction in a Documentary Program ==
- Gerry Rogers – My Left Breast (Pope Productions)
- John Kastner – Witness – Chickens are People Too (Canadian Broadcasting Corporation)
- Richard Meech – In the Shadow of a Saint: The Ken Wiwa Story (Nomad Films)
- Anne Wheeler – The Orkney Lad: The Story of Isabel Gunn (Wheelwright Ink)
- Michael McNamara – Wrinkle (Real to Reel Productions)

== Best Direction in a Documentary Series ==
- David Tucker – The Nature of Things – Amanda's Choice (CBC)
- Robbie Hart – Rainmakers (Adobe Productions)
- Patricio Henríquez – Rainmakers (Adobe Productions)
- Lindalee Tracey – Toronto: City of Dreams (White Pine Pictures)
- Moira Simpson – Titans (Paperny Entertainment)

== Best Direction in a Comedy Program or Series ==
- Chris Labonte – John Callahan's Quads! – Maimed Manor (Nelvana/SBS independent/Animation Works/Media World Features/Film Victoria/ScreenWest/Lotteries Commission of Western Australia)
- David Steinberg – Big Sound (Peace Arch Entertainment)
- Stephen Reynolds – Made in Canada – Teamwork (Salter Street Films/Island Edge)
- William G. Elliott – The Red Green Show (Red Green Productions)
- Henry Sarwer-Foner – This Hour Has 22 Minutes (Salter Street Films/CBC)

== Best Direction in a Variety, or Performing Arts Program or Series ==
- Barbara Willis Sweete – Great Performances: Don Giovanni Unmasked (Rhombus Media/Thirteen/WNET)
- Steven Goldmann – Stampede! (CBC)
- David New – Dinner at the Edge (Sienna Films)
- Shelagh O'Brien – East Coast Music Awards (East Coast Music Association/CBC Halifax)
- Barbara Willis Sweete – Four Seasons (Rhombus Media/Veronica Tennant Productions)

== Best Writing in a Dramatic Program or Miniseries ==
- Suzette Couture – After the Harvest (Alberta Filmworks/Sarrazin Couture Entertainment/Stornoway Communications)
- Michael Amo – Blessed Stranger: After Flight 111 (Big Motion Pictures/CTV/Salter Street Films)
- Graeme Manson, John Frizzell – Lucky Girl (Alliance Atlantis/Triptych Media)
- Andrew Rai Berzins – Scorn (Alliance Atlantis/Barna-Alper Productions/CBC/Eurasia Motion Pictures/Face to Face Media Society/Kinetic Productions)
- Paul Dreskin – The Ride (Mirage Productions/A. Smith & Co. Productions)

== Best Writing in a Dramatic Series ==
- Alan Di Fiore, Chris Haddock – Da Vinci's Inquest – It's Backwards Day (Haddock Entertainment/Barna-Alper Productions/Alliance Atlantis/CBC)
- Cal Coons – Blue Murder (Barna-Alper Productions/Canwest/North Bend Films)
- Frank Borg – Da Vinci's Inquest (Haddock Entertainment/Barna-Alper Productions/Alliance Atlantis/CBC)
- Esta Spalding – Da Vinci's Inquest (Haddock Entertainment/Barna-Alper Productions/Alliance Atlantis/CBC)
- Scott Peters – The Outer Limits (Alliance Atlantis/Atlantis Films/Showtime Networks/Trilogy Entertainment)

== Best Writing in a Comedy or Variety Program or Series ==
- Daryn Jones, Michael MacKinnon, Morgan Smith – Buzz (MTR Entertainment)
- Ed Macdonald – Made in Canada (Salter Street Films/Island Edge)
- Gord Holtham, John Morgan, Rick Olsen – Air Farce Live (CBC)
- Tim Progosh, Laura McGhee – The 2001 Canadian Comedy Awards (The Comedy Network)
- Steve Smith, Bob Bainborough, Shaun Graham, Bruce Pirrie, Richard McDonald, Jeff Lumby, Lee Smart – The Red Green Show (Red Green Productions)
- Cathy Jones, Peter McBain, Luciano Casimiri, Mark Farrell, Rick Mercer, Kevin White, Greg Thomey, Mary Walsh, George Westerholm – This Hour Has 22 Minutes (Salter Street Films/CBC)

== Best Writing in an Information Program or Series ==
- Linden MacIntyre – the fifth estate – Scandal of the Century (CBC)
- Joe Schlesinger – Foreign Assignment (CBC Newsworld)
- Debbie Lightle-Quan – Hype & Hope (CBC)
- Catherine Legge – Undercurrents (CBC)

== Best Writing in a Documentary Program or Series ==
- Kevin McMahon – Cod: The Fish That Changed The World (Salter Street Films/Primitive Features)
- Mort Ransen – Ah the Money, the Money, the Money: The Battle for Saltspring (NFB)
- Julie Wheelwright, Penny Wheelwright – The Orkney Lad: The Story of Isabel Gunn (Wheelwright Ink)
- Felicia Francescut, Leslie Côté – Through Thick and Thin (High Road Productions)
- David Kaufman – Turning Points of History (History Television)

== Best Writing in a Children's or Youth Program ==
- Gerard Lewis – Mentors – Klondike Daze (Mind's Eye Entertainment/Anaid Productions)
- Ian Weir – Edgemont (CBC/Omnifilm Entertainment)
- Alex Pugsley – I Was a Sixth Grade Alien (Winklemania Productions/AAC Kids)
- Vito Viscomi – Yvon of the Yukon (Studio B Productions, Alliance Atlantis, Corus Entertainment)

== Best Performance by an Actor in a Leading Role in a Dramatic Program or Miniseries ==
- Hugh Thompson – Blessed Stranger: After Flight 111 (Big Motion Pictures/CTV/Salter Street Films)
- Peter Outerbridge – Chasing Cain (CBC/Salter Street Films)
- Ron White – Heart: The Marilyn Bell Story (Bernard Zukerman/Cinar)
- Alec Baldwin – Nuremberg (Alliance Atlantis/CTV/British American Entertainment/Cypress Films/Les Productions La Fête)
- Eric Johnson – Scorn (Alliance Atlantis/Barna-Alper Productions/CBC/Eurasia Motion Pictures/Face to Face Media Society/Kinetic Productions)

== Best Performance by an Actress in a Leading Role in a Dramatic Program or Miniseries ==
- Elisha Cuthbert – Lucky Girl (Alliance Atlantis/Triptych Media)
- Alberta Watson – After the Harvest (Alberta Filmworks/Sarrazin Couture Entertainment/Stornoway Communications)
- Nadia Litz – After the Harvest (Alberta Filmworks/Sarrazin Couture Entertainment/Stornoway Communications)
- Kate Nelligan – Blessed Stranger: After Flight 111 (Big Motion Pictures/CTV/Salter Street Films)
- Sumela Kay – Virtual Mom (Catalyst Entertainment/Miracle Pictures)

== Best Performance by an Actor in a Continuing Leading Dramatic Role ==
- Nicholas Campbell – Da Vinci's Inquest – It's Backwards Day (Haddock Entertainment/Barna-Alper Productions/Alliance Atlantis/CBC)
- Jeremy Ratchford – Blue Murder (Barna-Alper Productions/Canwest/North Bend Films)
- Mark Taylor – Drop the Beat (Back Alley Film Productions)
- Gabriel Hogan – The Associates (Alliance Atlantis)
- Demore Barnes – The Associates (Alliance Atlantis)

== Best Performance by an Actress in a Continuing Leading Dramatic Role ==
- Babz Chula – These Arms of Mine – So Young (Forefront Entertainment/Arms Length Productions)
- Maria del Mar – Blue Murder – Partners (Barna-Alper Productions/Canwest/North Bend Films)
- Julie Stewart – Cold Squad (Keatley MacLeod Productions/Atlantis Films)
- Amanda Tapping – Stargate SG-1 (Stargate SG-1 Productions)
- Tamara Hickey – The Associates (Alliance Atlantis)

== Best Performance by an Actor in a Guest Role Dramatic Series ==
- Nicholas Campbell – Blue Murder – Steel Drums (Barna-Alper Productions/Canwest/North Bend Films)
- Patrick McKenna – Blue Murder (Barna-Alper Productions/Canwest/North Bend Films)
- Tim Bissett – Cold Squad (Keatley MacLeod Productions/Atlantis Films)
- Winston Rekert – Cold Squad (Keatley MacLeod Productions/Atlantis Films)
- Ron Small – These Arms of Mine (Forefront Entertainment/Arms Length Productions)
- Frank Moore – Twice in a Lifetime (Pebblehut Productions/Paxson Entertainment/CTV

== Best Performance by an Actress in a Guest Role Dramatic Series ==
- Kari Matchett – Blue Murder – Intensive Care (Barna-Alper Productions/Canwest/North Bend Films)
- Rosemary Dunsmore – Blue Murder (Barna-Alper Productions/Canwest/North Bend Films)
- Allegra Fulton – Blue Murder (Barna-Alper Productions/Canwest/North Bend Films)
- Shannon Powell – Da Vinci's Inquest (Haddock Entertainment/Barna-Alper Productions/Alliance Atlantis/CBC)
- Cloris Leachman – Twice in a Lifetime (Pebblehut Productions/Paxson Entertainment/CTV

== Best Performance by an Actor in a Featured Supporting Role in a Dramatic Program or Miniseries ==
- Brian Cox – Nuremberg (Alliance Atlantis/CTV/British American Entertainment/Cypress Films/Les Productions La Fête)
- Gerard Parkes – Blessed Stranger: After Flight 111 (Big Motion Pictures/CTV/Salter Street Films)
- Robert Joy – Bonhoeffer: Agent of Grace (NFP Teleart Berlin, Norflicks Productions, Ostdeutscher Rundfunk Brandenburg)
- Colm Feore – Haven (Alliance Atlantis/Paulette Breen Productions)
- Bruce Greenwood – Haven (Alliance Atlantis/Paulette Breen Productions)

== Best Performance by an Actress in a Featured Supporting Role in a Dramatic Program or Miniseries ==
- Sherry Miller – Lucky Girl (Alliance Atlantis/Triptych Media)
- Kari Matchett – Criminal Instinct: A Colder Kind of Death (CTV/Carlton America/Shaftesbury Films)
- Janet Wright – Chasing Cain (CBC/Salter Street Films)
- Lise Roy – Children of My Heart (Buffalo Gal Pictures/Tapestry Films)
- Jennifer Dale – Revenge of the Land (Bernard Zukerman Productions/Cinar)

== Best Performance by an Actor in a Featured Supporting Role in a Dramatic Series ==
- Garry Chalk – Cold Squad – Loose Ends, Part 2 (Keatley MacLeod Productions/Atlantis Films)
- Gregory Calpakis – Cold Squad (Keatley MacLeod Productions/Atlantis Films)
- Stephen E. Miller – Da Vinci's Inquest (Haddock Entertainment/Barna-Alper Productions/Alliance Atlantis/CBC)
- Rob LaBelle – First Wave (Sugar Entertainment/Vidatron Entertainment)
- Sean Gregory Sullivan – The Associates (Alliance Atlantis)

== Best Performance by an Actress in a Featured Supporting Role in a Dramatic Series ==
- Tamara Craig Thomas – Cold Squad – The Box (Keatley MacLeod Productions/Atlantis Films)
- Mimi Kuzyk – Blue Murder (Barna-Alper Productions/Canwest/North Bend Films)
- Lisa Ryder – Andromeda (Fireworks Entertainment/Tribune Entertainment/BLT Productions/Global/MBR Productions)
- Marnie McPhail – The Associates (Alliance Atlantis)
- Colleen Rennison – These Arms of Mine (Forefront Entertainment/Arms Length Productions)

== Best Individual Performance in a Comedy Program or Series ==
- Jason Rouse – Comedy Now! – Jason Rouse: The Series (CTV, Hi Guys Ten Productions)
- Glen Foster – Comedy Now! – Glen Foster: That Canadian Guy (CTV, Hi Guys Ten Productions)
- Jessica Holmes – Comedy Now! – Jessica Holmes: Holmes Alone (CTV, Hi Guys Ten Productions)
- Jonathan Torrens – Jonovision (CBC)
- Shaun Majumder – Halifax Comedy Festival (CBC)

== Best Ensemble Performance in a Comedy Program or Series ==
- Rick Mercer, Emily Hampshire, Peter Keleghan, Dan Lett, Leah Pinsent – Made in Canada – Alan's Ex (Salter Street Films/Island Edge)
- Kim Bubbs, George Buza, Wayne Robson, Steve Smith, Peter Keleghan, Bob Bainborough, Jeff Lumby – The Red Green Show (Red Green Productions)
- Rick Mercer, Greg Thomey, Cathy Jones, Mary Walsh – This Hour Has 22 Minutes (Salter Street Films/CBC)
- Sandi Ross, Cory Bowles, Sarah Dunsworth-Nickerson, Lucy DeCoutere, John Dunsworth, Mike Smith, John Paul Tremblay, Ardon Bess, Barrie Dunn, Michael Jackson, Jonathan Torrens, Jeanna Harrison, Robb Wells, Patrick Roach – Trailer Park Boys (Showcase, Sunnyvale Productions)
- Peter Keleghan, Leah Pinsent, Dan Lett, Rick Mercer, Jackie Torrens – Made in Canada (Salter Street Films/Island Edge)

== Best Performance or Host in a Variety Program or Series ==
- Seán Cullen – Just for Laughs (Just for Laughs Comedy Festival/Les Films Rozon)
- Jonathan Torrens – Jonovision, World Television Appeal (CBC)
- John Pinette – Just for Laughs (Just for Laughs Comedy Festival/Les Films Rozon)
- Alan Doyle – Juno Songwriter's Circle (Canadian Academy of Recording Arts and Sciences/CBC)

An additional nomination, to Rick Mercer for the television special Talking to Americans, was withdrawn at Mercer's request due to his belief that humour at the expense of Americans was no longer appropriate in the wake of the September 11 attacks.

== Best Performance in a Performing Arts Program or Series ==
- Rex Harrington – Four Seasons (Rhombus Media/Veronica Tennant Productions)
- Dmitri Hvorostovsky – Great Performances: Don Giovanni Unmasked (Rhombus Media/Thirteen/WNET)
- Isabel Bayrakdarian – Opening Night (CBC)
- Measha Brueggergosman – Opening Night – Beatrice Chancy (CBC)
- Alvin Erasga Tolentino – Sola (King Arthur Productions)

== Best Performance in a Preschool Program or Series ==
- Eric Peterson – Sesame Park – Old King Cole (Canadian Broadcasting Corporation|CBC)
- Natasha LaForce – Polka Dot Door – Polkaroo's Awesome ABCs (TVOntario)
- James Rankin – Scoop and Doozie (Queen Bee Productions)
- Pier Paquette – Sesame Park (Canadian Broadcasting Corporation|CBC)
- Gisèle Corinthios – The Nook Counting Network (TVOntario)

== Best Performance in a Children's or Youth Program or Series ==
- Brendan Fletcher – Caitlin's Way – The Easy Way (Riverwood Productions/Fireworks Entertainment/Lynch Entertainment/Nickelodeon)
- Lindsay Felton – Caitlin's Way (Riverwood Productions/Fireworks Entertainment/Lynch Entertainment/Nickelodeon)
- Vanessa King – Edgemont – This Song's For You (CBC/Omnifilm Entertainment)
- Tyler Kyte – Popular Mechanics For Kids (SDA Productions)
- Lee Thompson Young – The Famous Jett Jackson (Alliance Atlantis/Everyone is JP Kids)

== Best News Anchor ==
- Peter Mansbridge – The National/CBC News – P.E.T./Town Hall/Election (CBC)
- Diana Swain – Canada Now Winnipeg (CBC)
- Lloyd Robertson – CTV National News – Election 2000/Pierre Elliott Trudeau: Final Farewell/Canadian Alliance Leadership Vote (CTV News)
- Sandie Rinaldo – CTV National News – U.S. Presidential Race/Laura Latimer/Election Call (CTV News)
- Lisa LaFlamme – CTV National News – U.S. Election/Quest for the Commons/The Latimer Decision (CTV News)

== Best Reportage ==
- Paula Newton – CTV National News – Kidney Selling (CTV News)
- Don Murray – The National/CBC News – Belgrade October 2000 (CBC)
- Natalie Clancy – The National/CBC News – Innu Crisis (CBC)
- Neil Macdonald – The National/CBC News – Jerusalem 2000 (CBC)
- Avis Favaro – CTV National News – Cancer Doctors (CTV News)

== Best Information Segment ==
- Marie Caloz, Eve Savory – The National/CBC News – Cost of Survival (CBC)
- Morris Karp – Canada Now Winnipeg (CBC)
- Natalie Clancy, Stuart Coxe – CBC News: The Lost People (CBC)
- Dan Bjarnason, Lynn Burgess – The National/CBC News – Look Back in Sorrow (CBC)
- Wendy Trueman, Avis Favaro – W5 (CTV)

== Best Host or Interviewer in a News or Talk/General Information Program or Series ==
- Wendy Mesley – Undercurrents – Government Ads/Inside Information/Protecting Your Privacy (CBC)
- Valerie Pringle – Canada AM (CTV)
- Linden MacIntyre – the fifth estate (CBC)
- Hana Gartner – the fifth estate (CBC)
- Avi Lewis – CounterSpin (CBC Newsworld)

== Best Host in a Lifestyle, or Performing Arts Program or Series ==
- David Gale – Loving Spoonfuls – Anja Karppinen (Indivisual Productions)
- Debbie Travis – Debbie Travis’ Painted House (Whalley-Abbey Media Holdings)
- Chris Hyndman, Steven Sabados – Designer Guys (WestWind Pictures)
- Peter Jordan – It's a Living (CBC Manitoba/Life Network)
- Sarah Richardson – Room Service (US) (Nordisk Film & TV)
- Carlo Rota – The Great Canadian Food Show (CBC)

== Best Sports Broadcaster ==
- Ron MacLean – NHL All Star Break & NHL All Star Game (CBC)
- Tom Harrington – 2000 Olympic Summer Games/Sports Journal (CBC Sports)
- Brian Williams – 2000 Olympic Summer Games – Daniel Igali/Donovan Bailey/Canadian Trail (CBC Sports)
- Steve Armitage – 2000 Olympic Summer Games – Ian Thorpe/Curtis Mayden/Swimming Recap (CBC Sports)
- Terry Leibel – 2000 Olympic Summer Games – Show Opening/Panel Interview/Simon Whitfield (CBC Sports)
- James Duthie – CFL on TSN – CFL Friday Night Football: BC at Hamilton (TSN)

== Best Photography in a Dramatic Program or Series ==
- Guy Dufaux – Haven (Alliance Atlantis/Paulette Breen Productions)
- Gregory Middleton – After the Harvest (Alberta Filmworks/Sarrazin Couture Entertainment/Stornoway Communications)
- David Moxness – Earth: Final Conflict (Atlantis Films)
- Alain Dostie – Nuremberg (Alliance Atlantis/CTV/British American Entertainment/Cypress Films/Les Productions La Fête)
- Philip Earnshaw – The Associates (Alliance Atlantis)

== Best Photography in a Comedy, Variety, Performing Arts Program or Series ==
- Rene Ohashi – Great Performances: Don Giovanni Unmasked (Rhombus Media/Thirteen/WNET)
- Jean Renaud – East Coast Music Awards (East Coast Music Association/CBC Halifax)
- Barry Parrell – Four Seasons (Rhombus Media/Veronica Tennant Productions)
- Jason Tan – Love Me Madly (Wild Dog Choir/Paulus Productions/BravoFACT)
- Michael Balfry – Sola (King Arthur Productions)

== Best Photography in an Information Program or Series ==
- Robert Fresco – Exhibit A: Secrets of Forensic Science – Beauty Shop Bandit (Kensington Communications)
- Neil Carleton – CBC News: Country Canada (CBC)
- Gilles Blais – Her Money (Whalley-Abbey Media)
- Jim Cassidy – Hockey Night in Canada (CBC)
- Ian Kerr – Quiet Places (Omnifilm Entertainment)

== Best Photography in a Documentary Program or Series ==
- David Frazee – Tokyo Girls (NFB)
- Michael Sweeney – Canada: A People's History – When the World Began (CBC)
- Eric Schurman, Frank Vilaca, Ihor Macijiwsky – The Flight: Departure
- John Petrella – Echoes of the North (Ellis Entertainment)
- Claude-Julie Parisot, German Gutierrez – Insectia – Outlaws (Cinétévé/Pixcom/La Cinquième)

== Best Visual Effects ==
- Noel Hooper, Mark Fordham, Robin Mitchell, Michael Pieczonka – Nuremberg (Alliance Atlantis/CTV/British American Entertainment/Cypress Films/Les Productions La Fête)
- Joe Farrell, Geoff Anderson, Roberto Biagi, James Kawano, Darren Marcoux, Jim Finn, Tom Tennisco, Bruce MacDougall – Andromeda (Fireworks Entertainment/Tribune Entertainment/BLT Productions/Global/MBR Productions)
- Robin Hackl, Christine Petrov, Kent Matheson, Wray J. Douglas, Debora Dunphy, Jeremy Hoey, James Tichenor, Judy D. Shane, Erik Ellefsen, Shannon Gurney, Greg Hansen, Craig Van Den Biggelaar – Stargate SG-1 – Small Victories (Stargate SG-1 Productions)
- Marc Roth, Shannon Gurney, Bruce Woloshyn, Craig Van Den Biggelaar, James Tichenor, Michelle Comens, Stephen Bahr, Robin Hackl – Stargate SG-1 – Tangent (Stargate SG-1 Productions)
- Steve Anker, Patrick Halm, Lydia Hamilton, Joe Farrell, Tom Tennisco – The Outer Limits (Alliance Atlantis/Atlantis Films/Showtime Networks/Trilogy Entertainment)

== Best Picture Editing in a Dramatic Program or Series ==
- Richard Comeau – Heart: The Marilyn Bell Story (Bernard Zukerman/Cinar)
- Susan Shipton – Blessed Stranger: After Flight 111 (Big Motion Pictures/CTV/Salter Street Films)
- Scott Vickrey – Haven (Alliance Atlantis/Paulette Breen Productions)
- Brett Sullivan – Lucky Girl (Alliance Atlantis/Triptych Media)
- Dean Soltys – Task Force: Caviar (Big Motion Pictures/Canwest)

== Best Picture Editing in a Comedy, Variety, Performing Arts Program or Series ==
- Kevin Cottam, Kris Fleerackers, Andrew Ranford – Sola (King Arthur Productions)
- Vesna Svilanovic – A Very Dangerous Pastime: A Devastatingly Simple Dance Guide (National Arts Centre)
- James Ho Lim – Dinner at the Edge (Sienna Films)
- David Wharnsby – Four Seasons (Rhombus Media/Veronica Tennant Productions)
- Allan MacLean, Todd Foster, Keith Bradley, Eric Campbell, Gregg Antworth – This Hour Has 22 Minutes (Salter Street Films/CBC)

== Best Picture Editing in an Information Program or Series ==
- Omar Majeed- QT: QueerTelevision – Secrets of Sight (CHUM)
- Nick Hector – Birth Stories (Cineflix/Slice/Sky Living)
- Tania White – Canada Now Winnipeg (CBC)
- Michael Lloyd – It's a Living (CBC Manitoba/Life Network)
- David Stonier, Zsolt Luka – Popular Mechanics For Kids (SDA Productions)

== Best Picture Editing in a Documentary Program or Series ==
- Bonni Devlin – Tokyo Girls (NFB)
- Trevor Aikman – 13 Seconds: The Kent State Shootings (Partners in Motion/Single Spark Pictures)
- Matthew Hornburg – Crossing Bridges
- Barry Davis – The Flight: Departure
- Daniel Berman – Dewey Time (Blue Train Films)
- Kip Spidell – Echoes of the North (Ellis Entertainment)

== Best Production Design or Art Direction in a Dramatic Program or Series ==
- Guy Lalande, Frances Calder – Nuremberg (Alliance Atlantis/CTV/British American Entertainment/Cypress Films/Les Productions La Fête)
- Louise Middleton – After the Harvest (Alberta Filmworks/Sarrazin Couture Entertainment/Stornoway Communications)
- Erica Milo, Taavo Soodor – Haven – Part I (Alliance Atlantis/Paulette Breen Productions)
- Jon P. Goulding, Ed Hanna – Relic Hunter – Dagger of Death (CHUM/ProSiebenSat.1 Media/M6/Rysher Entertainment/Gaumont International Television/Fireworks Entertainment)
- Brentan Harron, Robert Davidson, Ivana Vasak, Doug McLean, Mark Davidson, Bridget McGuire, Richard Hudolin – Stargate SG-1 (Stargate SG-1 Productions)

== Best Production Design or Art Direction in a Non-Dramatic Program or Series ==
- Teresa Przybylski, Graeme Morphy – Great Performances: Don Giovanni Unmasked (Rhombus Media/Thirteen/WNET)
- Ricardo Spinacé – Big Sound (Peace Arch Entertainment)
- André Viens – The Bewitched Child
- Mary Kerr – The Toy Castle (Sound Venture Productions)
- Milton Parcher – YAA! The 11th Annual YTV Achievement Awards (YTV)

== Best Costume Design ==
- Renée April – The Hound of the Baskervilles (Muse Entertainment)
- Lizzie McGovern – After the Harvest (Alberta Filmworks/Sarrazin Couture Entertainment/Stornoway Communications)
- Michael Harris – Haven (Alliance Atlantis/Paulette Breen Productions)
- Mario Davignon – Nuremberg (Alliance Atlantis/CTV/British American Entertainment/Cypress Films/Les Productions La Fête)
- Renée April, Mariane Carter – Revenge of the Land (Bernard Zukerman Productions/Cinar)

== Best Achievement in Makeup ==
- Dorota Ergetowski, Joel Echallier, Celine Godeau – Island of Shadows: D'Arcy Island Leper Colony, 1891–1924 (Red Storm Productions)
- Katrin Clark-Citroen, Catherine Davies Irvine – I Was a Sixth Grade Alien (Winklemania Productions/AAC Kids)
- Micheline Trépanier, Carl Fullerton – Nuremberg (Alliance Atlantis/CTV/British American Entertainment/Cypress Films/Les Productions La Fête)
- Diane Simard – Revenge of the Land (Bernard Zukerman Productions/Cinar)
- Debra Regnier, Joel Echallier, Fay von Schroeder – The Outer Limits – Glitch (Alliance Atlantis/Atlantis Films/Showtime Networks/Trilogy Entertainment)

== Best Overall Sound in a Dramatic Program or Series ==
- Todd B. Warren, Christian Carruthers, Andrew Tay, Robert Woolfson – RoboCop – Prime Directives, Dark Justice (Fireworks Entertainment/Rysher Entertainment/Skyvision Entertainment/Rigel Entertainment)
- Steve Foster, Paul Shubat, George Tarrant – After the Harvest (Alberta Filmworks/Sarrazin Couture Entertainment/Stornoway Communications)
- Dean Giammarco, William Skinner, Michael Colomby, Tyler Berrie – Da Vinci's Inquest – This Shit is Evil (Haddock Entertainment/Barna-Alper Productions/Alliance Atlantis/CBC)
- Véronique Gabillaud, Pierre L'Abbé, Raymond Vermette – Heart: The Marilyn Bell Story (Bernard Zukerman/Cinar)
- Claude La Haye, Lou Solakofski, Orest Sushko, Ian Rankin – Nuremberg (Alliance Atlantis/CTV/British American Entertainment/Cypress Films/Les Productions La Fête)

== Best Sound Editing in a Dramatic Program or Series ==
- Alice Wright, Diane Boucher, Louis Dupire, Guy Francoeur, Christian Rivest – Bonanno: A Godfather's Story (Armeda/Daniel L. Paulson Productions/Les Productions La Fête)
- John Taylor, Michael Colomby, Rick Senechal, Patrick Haskill, Ian Mackie, Don Harrison – Da Vinci's Inquest – This Shit is Evil (Haddock Entertainment/Barna-Alper Productions/Alliance Atlantis/CBC)
- Monique Vézina, Serge Fortin, Natalie Fleurant – Heart: The Marilyn Bell Story (Bernard Zukerman/Cinar)
- Paul Shikata, Donna G. Powell, Rick Cadger, Ronayne Higginson – Nuremberg (Alliance Atlantis/CTV/British American Entertainment/Cypress Films/Les Productions La Fête)
- Devan Kraushar, Cam Wagner, Kirby Jinnah, Jacqueline Cristianini – Scorn (Alliance Atlantis/Barna-Alper Productions/CBC/Eurasia Motion Pictures/Face to Face Media Society/Kinetic Productions)

== Best Sound in a Comedy, Variety, or Performing Arts Program or Series ==
- Simon Bowers – Jann Arden: Live at Last (Insight Productions)
- Daniel Hamood, John Martin, Ric Rokicki, John Hazen, Steve Hammond – Dinner at the Edge (Sienna Films)
- Doug Doctor, Jane Tattersall, Andy Malcolm, Lou Solakofski, Peter Cook, Martin Lee, Mark Shnuriwsky – Great Performances: Don Giovanni Unmasked (Rhombus Media/Thirteen/WNET)
- Rico Ciavarella, Peter Lederer, Brian Boyle, Mark Fulton, Doug McClement – Intimate and Interactive (MuchMusic)
- David Ramsahoye, Peter Lederer – Live At The Rehearsal Hall (Bravo!)
- Brian Power, Neal Gaudet, Kenny MacDonald, P.J. MacNeil, Bob Melanson, David Thomas – This Hour Has 22 Minutes (Salter Street Films/CBC)

== Best Sound in an Information/Documentary Program or Series ==
- Ron Searles, Steve Cupani – Canada: A People's History – Battle for a Continent (CBC)
- Ric Jurgens, Steve McNamee, Scott Murdoch – A Moment in Time: The United Colours of Bronstein (Judy Films)
- Sean Macrae, Michael Nunan – Eco-Challenge Borneo (Mark Burnett Productions)
- Dwayne Newman – Counter Force (Red Apple Entertainment)
- Lock Johnston, Eric Harwood Davies, Ron Searles – The Nature of Things – The Salmon Forest (CBC)

== Best Original Music Score for a Program or Miniseries ==
- Geoff Bennett, Longo Hai, Ben Johannesen – Dinner at the Edge (Sienna Films)
- Ron Sures – Blessed Stranger: After Flight 111 (Big Motion Pictures/CTV/Salter Street Films)
- Richard Grégoire – Nuremberg (Alliance Atlantis/CTV/British American Entertainment/Cypress Films/Les Productions La Fête)
- Jonathan Goldsmith – Scorn (Alliance Atlantis/Barna-Alper Productions/CBC/Eurasia Motion Pictures/Face to Face Media Society/Kinetic Productions)
- Graeme Coleman – The Secret Life of Algernon (Marano Productions/Productions Phare Est)

== Best Original Music Score for a Dramatic Series ==
- John Van Tongeren – The Outer Limits – Simon Says (Alliance Atlantis/Atlantis Films/Showtime Networks/Trilogy Entertainment)
- Richard Grégoire – Bonanno: A Godfather's Story (Armeda/Daniel L. Paulson Productions/Les Productions La Fête)
- Daniel Fernandez, Jack Procher – Redwall – Mattimeo: A Tale of Redwall (Nelvana/Molitor Productions/TV-Loonland AG)
- JP Houston – Land O’ Hands (Radical Sheep Productions, Treehouse TV)
- Paul Koffman, Tim Foy, Carlos Lopes – Our Hero (Heroic Television/Decode Entertainment)

== Best Original Music Score for a Documentary Program or Series ==
- Claude Desjardins, Eric Robertson – Canada: A People's History – When the World Began (CBC)
- Christopher Dedrick – Counter Force (Red Apple Entertainment)
- Andy McNeil – Cloud of Death
- Eric Lemoyne – Faith and Fortune: The Reichmann Story (Handel Productions)
- Richard Horowitz – The View from Here (TVOntario))

== Special awards ==
- Gordon Sinclair Award For Broadcast Journalism – Bill Cunningham
- Earle Grey Award – Jackie Burroughs
- Margaret Collier Award – David Barlow
- Gemini Award for Outstanding Technical Achievement – CBC Television – CBC National Satellite DVC Project
- Canada Award – Karen Lee, Shan Tam: Made in China: The Story of Adopted Children from China
- Academy Achievement Award – Dorothy Gardner
- Royal Canadian Mint's Viewer's Choice Award – John Morgan, Luba Goy, Don Ferguson, Roger Abbott – Air Farce Live
- Gemini Award for Most Popular Website Competition – Kim Wilson, Mark Bishop, Marney Berube, Ted Brunt – TVOKids
- Gemini Humanitarian Award – Donald Martin
