= Robert Lang (producer) =

Canadian film producer, director, and writer

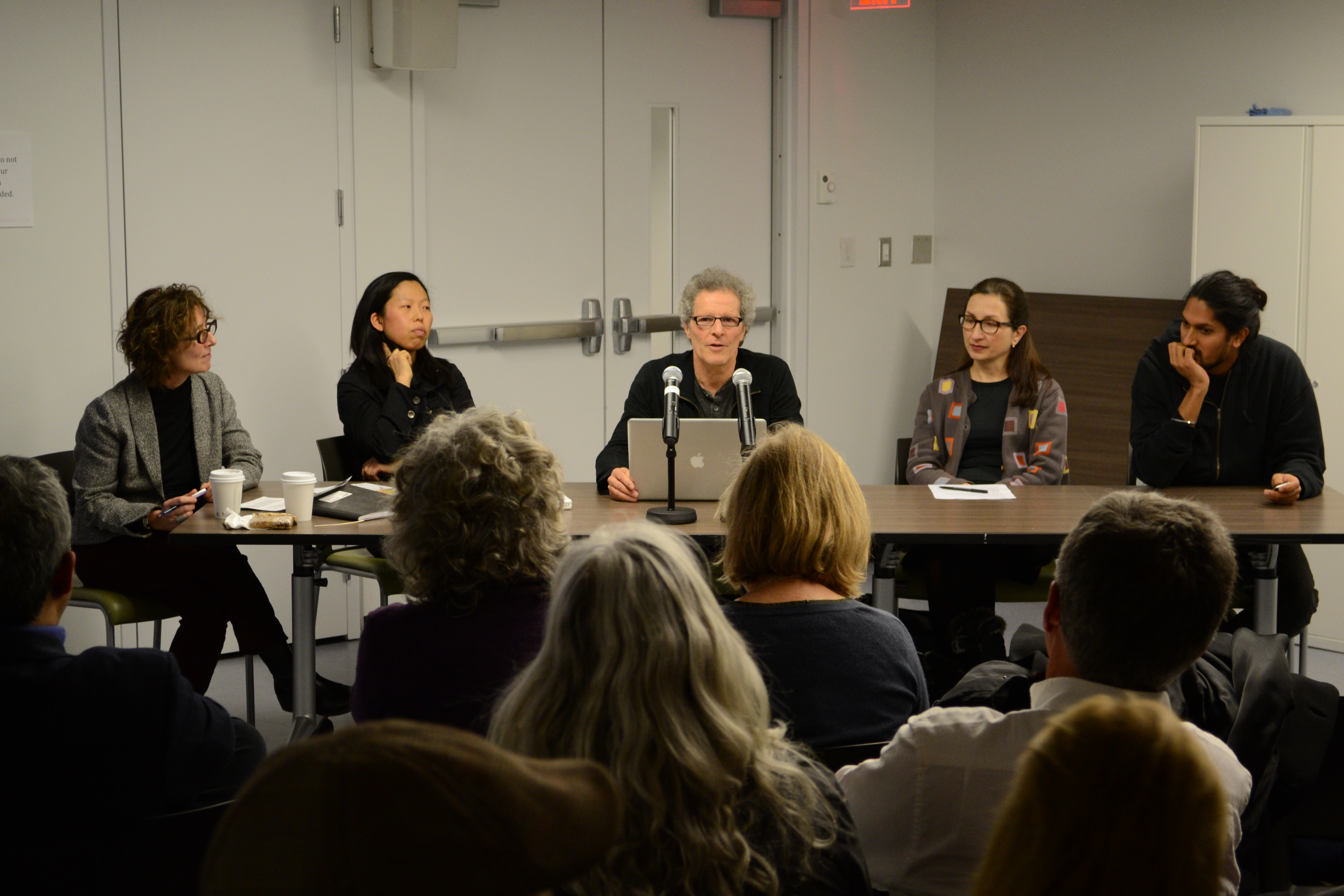
- Robert Lang (middle)
- Occupations: Producer, director, Writer.
- Writing career
- Years active: 1972 - present
- Genres: Documentary, Factual television
- Notable works: Museum Secrets, Raw Opium, The Sacred Balance

Robert Lang is a Canadian film producer, director, and writer. His career began in Montreal in the early 1970s working on independent productions and at the National Film Board of Canada as a documentary film director and cinematographer. In 1980, he moved to Toronto's Kensington Market, where he founded his own independent production company, Kensington Communications, to produce documentaries for television and educational markets. Since 1998, Lang has also been involved in conceiving and producing interactive media for the Web and mobile devices.

== Career ==
=== Science ===
- Fluid: Life Beyond The Binary (2024) - Producer - Produced for CBC’s The Nature of Things.
- Why We Dance (2022) - Producer - Produced for CBC’s The Nature of Things.
- Nature's Cleanup Crew (2022) - Producer - Produced for CBC’s The Nature of Things.
- Champions vs Legends (2017) - Producer - Produced for CBC’s The Nature of Things.
- The Equalizer (2016) - Producer - Produced for CBC’s The Nature of Things.
- The Sacred Balance (2002) - Executive Producer, Director - 4 part series produced for CBC and PBS.
- Fragile Harvest (1985) - Director, Producer - Produced for CBC’s The Nature of Things.
- Separate Lives (1996) - Director, Producer - Premiered on Discovery (Canada).

=== Music and Arts ===
- My Beat: the Life and Times of Bruce Cockburn (2001), Producer, produced for CBC.
- River of Sand (1998), Producer, Director, produced for Vision TV, and TVO and Link TV (USA).
- The Biggest Little Ticket (1994), Producer, Director, family music special for CTV Television Network.
- Mariposa: Under a Stormy Sky (1991), Producer, Co-Director, produced for CTV, TVO, the Discovery Channel (USA), and other networks.
- One Warm Line: The Legacy of Stan Rogers (1988), Producer, Co-director, produced for CBC, and broadcast by Bravo, Vision, and many other Canadian broadcasters.

=== Social/Political ===
- The Shadow of Gold (2019) - Feature Documentary - Producer, Director - The Shadow of Gold was released in two formats: a feature-length documentary and a two-part television mini-series. Produced for TVO and Arte France.
- Risk Factor (2017), AKA The Truth About Risk - Producer, Director - Produced for TVO.
- Raw Opium (2011) - Co-Writer, Producer - Produced for TVO.
- Return to Nepal (2008) - Producer, Director - Produced for the Documentary Channel.
- Diamond Road (2007) - Feature Documentary - Producer, Executive Producer - Produced for TVO, Discovery Times, History Television, and ZDF/ARTE.
- Almost Home: a Sayisi Dene Journey (2003) - Producer, Co-director - Produced for CBC Nature of Things, APTN, Knowledge Network and SCN.
- A Place in the World (1995) - Producer, Director, Writer - Produced for Vision TV.
- Childhood's End (1981) - Producer, Co-director - Produced for TVO.
- Ridley: A Secret Garden (1981) - Director - Produced by the National Film Board of Canada (NFB).
- An Easy Pill to Swallow (1978) - Director, Writer - Produced by the National Film Board of Canada (NFB).
- Potatoes (1976) - Director, co-editor - Produced by the National Film Board of Canada (NFB).

=== Documentary and Factual Series ===
- Exhibit A: Secrets of Forensic Science (1997 - 2002) - Co-Creator, Executive Producer, Producer, Director - 65 half-hour episodes produced for Discovery Channel (Canada) the TLC (USA). True crime series focused on the role of forensic science in solving some of the most perplexing crimes of our time.
- The Sacred Balance (2002) - Executive Producer, Co-director - 4 part documentary series produced for CBC, PBS Network (USA) based on the best-selling book by David Suzuki and Amanda McConnell that presents a new inclusive vision of nature in which we human beings are intimately connected to all life processes on Earth.
- 72 Hours: True Crime, (2004 - 2007) - Co-creator, Executive Producer - 45 half-hour documentary series produced for CBC and TLC (USA). Blend of documentary and dramatic re-enactments to investigate true crime mysteries from across North America.
- Diamond Road (2007) - Producer, Executive Producer - 3 one-hour episodes for TVO, Discovery Times and ZDF/ARTE. Explores the historical, cultural and political facets of the world’s most intriguing gem.
- Museum Secrets (2010 - 2014) - Executive Producer, Co-creator, Director - 22 one-hour episodes for History Channel (Canada), Smithsonian Channel (USA), BBC Worldwide. The series explores compelling stories behind the artifacts in 22 of the world’s greatest museums.
- CitySonic (2009) - Producer, Director, Executive Producer - 20 short films for AUX TV that unlock the hidden history of Toronto’s music scene.
- Shameless Idealists (2012) - Director, Writer, Executive producer - 5 half-hours episodes series produced for CTV. Each episode provides an intimate portrait of a celebrity who has made an indelible mark through their work for social change.

=== Interactive Media ===
He has produced many interactive digital projects over the years, from River of Sand interactive website (1998), to The Sacred Balance online (2003), Diamond Road interactive documentary (2007), Museum Secrets Interactive (2011), ScopifyROM, a mobile app to enhance the museum experience at the Royal Ontario Museum (2013) and Risk Navigator mobile app (2017).

=== Volunteer work and Philanthropy ===
Between 1984 and 2019, Lang produced over 80 PSAs for international NGOs USC Canada (now called Seed Change) and the Climate Action Network. He was a recipient of the Queen Elizabeth II Golden Jubilee Medal in 2002 for his significant contributions to public life in Canada. In 2007, he established the R&M Lang Foundation to support a wide variety of charitable ventures. He's also been active in the production community as a founding member of the Documentary Organization of Canada, as a longtime board member (and its Chair for over 10 years) of The Real News and as the founder of the Hot Docs CrossCurrents Fund in 2013.

== Awards and nominations ==
Year	Award	Category	Work	Result
2017	Canadian Screen Awards	Best Sports Program	The Equalizer	Nominee
2016	49th International Independent Film Festival Worldfest Houston	Platinum Remi Award category Sports	The Equalizer	Won
2016	Paladino d'Oro Sport Film Festival	International Sport Film Festival	The Equalizer	Finalist
2014	Canadian Screen Awards	Best Factual	Museum Secrets	Won
2014	Canadian Screen Awards	Best Editing	Museum Secrets	Won
2013	Canadian Screen Awards	Best Sound in an Information/Documentary Program or Series	Museum Secrets	Won
2013	Canadian Screen Awards	Barbara Sears Award for Best Editorial Research	Raw Opium: Pain, Pleasure, Profits	Nominee
2011	Gemini Awards	Best Cross-Platform Project - Non-Fiction	Museum Secrets	Nominee
2011	Gemini Awards	Barbara Sears Award for Best Editorial Research	Museum Secrets	Nominee
2011	Gemini Awards	Best Original Music Score for a Documentary Program or Series	Museum Secrets	Nominee
2011	Banff World Media Festival	Best Cross-Platform Project	Museum Secrets	Finalist
2008	Gemini Awards	Best Documentary Series	Diamond Road	Won
2008	International Independent Film Festival Worldfest Houston	Platinum Remi Award Best Feature Documentary	Diamond Road	Won
2007	New York Festivals	Docudrama (World Medal)	72 Hours: True Crime	Won
2005	New York Festivals	Docudrama (World Medal)	72 Hours: True Crime	Won
2004	Yorkton Film Festival	Best Documentary, Social/Political (Golden Sheaf Award)	Almost Home: A Sayisi Dene Journey	Won
2004	Yorkton Short Film & Video Festival	NFB Kathleen Shannon Award	Almost Home: A Sayisi Dene Journey	Won
2003	Paris Festival International de l’Emission Scientifique de Télévision	Prix Science & Société	The Sacred Balance (Episode: "The Matrix of Life")	Won
2002	DGC Team Award	Outstanding Achievement in a Documentary	Exhibit A: Secrets of Forensic Science	Nominee
2001	Gemini Awards	Best Direction in a Documentary	Exhibit A: Secrets of Forensic Science	Nominee
2000	Canadian Society of Cinematographers	Best Cinematography in Documentary	Exhibit A: Secrets of Forensic Science	Won
1998	Gemini Awards	Science, Technology, Nature	Separate Lives	Won
1995	Alliance for Children and Television	Best Variety	The Biggest Little Ticket	Won
1994	Yorkton Film and TV Festival	Best Children’s/Variety (Golden Sheaf Award)	The Biggest Little Ticket	Won
