= Kensington Communications =

Canadian production company

Kensington Communications Inc
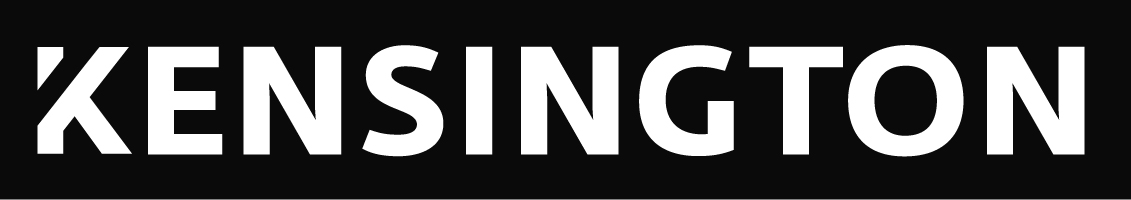
- Logo
- Location: Toronto, Ontario, Canada
- Founded: 1980 in Kensington Market, by Robert Lang
- Executive Producer: Robert Lang
- Writer & Web Developer: Allen Booth

Kensington Communications is a Toronto-based production company specializing in documentary films and factual television programming. Founded in Toronto's Kensington Market 1980 by Canadian producer and director Robert Lang, the company has produced over 250 programs, including popular documentary series and features which specialize in music, science, history and contemporary social issues.

Since the late 1990s, Kensington Communications has also developed multi-platform interactive projects for the web and mobile devices that incorporate entertaining educational components related to the content of its documentary productions. Its interactive initiatives have included rich media websites, mobile applications, locative documentaries and museum-based AR experiences.

== Recent Productions ==
In 2025, Kensington co-produced "Carnival: They Can't Steal Our Joy", an award-winning feature-length documentary for TVO and Knowledge Network that examines the cultural significance and social history of Caribbean Carnival traditions in Canada and around the world.

In 2024, Kensington produced "Fluid: Life Beyond the Binary", a one-hour documentary for CBC's "The Nature of Things", presented by Mae Martin, that explores the incredible diversity of sex, gender and biological variation across the natural world.

The company's other recent science productions include the one-hour science documentaries "Why We Dance" and "Nature's Cleanup Crew", both produced for CBC's "The Nature of Things"

== Filmography ==
=== Television Series ===
- Museum Secrets (2010–2014) - 22 one-hour episodes for History Channel (Canada), Smithsonian Channel (USA), UKTV, BBC Worldwide. The series explores compelling stories behind the artifacts in 22 of the world's greatest museums.
- Shameless Idealists (2012) - 5 half-hour episodes series produced for CTV. Each episode provides an intimate portrait of a celebrity who has made an indelible mark through their work for social change.
- CitySonic (2009) - 3 x ½ hours and 20 short films for AUX TV and online streaming that unlock the hidden history of Toronto's music scene through the artists' stories.
- Diamond Road (2007) - 3 one-hour episodes for TVO, Discovery Times and ZDF/ARTE. Explores the historical, cultural and political facets of the world's most intriguing gem.
- 72 Hours: True Crime, (2004 - 2007) - 45 half-hour documentary series produced for CBC and TLC (USA). Blend of documentary and dramatic re-enactments to investigate true crime mysteries from across North America.
- The Sacred Balance (2002) - a ground-breaking 4-part series produced for CBC and PBS with broadcaster-environmentalist David Suzuki that celebrates the interconnectedness of all life processes on Earth through the stories of scientists, philosophers and Indigenous elders. The series was accompanied by a rich media interactive website, SacredBalance.com.
- Exhibit A: Secrets of Forensic Science (1997 - 2002) - 65 half-hour episodes produced for Discovery Channel (Canada) and TLC (USA). Hosted by actor Graham Greene, true crime series focused on the role of forensic science in solving some of the most perplexing crimes of our time.

=== One-Off documentaries and TV Programs ===
- Carnival: They Can't Steal Our Joy (2025) - Feature documentary co-produced with Film Garage North for TVO and Knowledge BC.
- Fluid: Life Beyond the Binary (2024) - One-hour produced for CBC’s The Nature of Things.
- Why We Dance (2022) - One-hour produced for CBC’s The Nature of Things.
- Nature's Cleanup Crew (2020) - One-hour produced for CBC’s The Nature of Things and ZDF/ARTE.
- The Shadow of Gold (2019) - released in two formats: a feature-length documentary and a two-part television series. Co-Produced with Films à Cinq and CAPA Presse for TVO and Arte France.
- Champions vs. Legends (2017) - One-hour produced for CBC’s The Nature of Things and ZDF/ARTE.
- Risk Factor (2017), AKA The Truth About Risk - One-hour produced for TVO and Canal D.
- The Drop: Why Young People Don't Vote (2016) - One-hour produced for TVO and CPAC.
- The Equalizer (2016) - One-hour produced for CBC's The Nature of Things and ZDF/ARTE.
- Raw Opium (2011) - Feature documentary and 2-part series produced for TVO and ZDF/ARTE.
- Return to Nepal (2008) - One-hour produced for the Documentary Channel.
- Almost Home: a Sayisi Dene Journey (2003) - One-hour produced for CBC Nature of Things, APTN, Knowledge Network and SCN.
- My Beat: The Life and Times of Bruce Cockburn (2001) - One-hour produced for CBC.
- River of Sand (1998) - One-hour produced for Vision TV, TVO and Link TV (USA).
- Separate Lives (1996) - One-hour premiered on Discovery Channel (Canada).
- A Place in the World (1995) - One-hour produced for Vision TV, NFB.
- The Biggest Little Ticket (1993), One-hour family variety special produced for CTV Television Network.
- Mariposa: Under a Stormy Sky (1991) - One-hour documentary produced for CTV, TVO, the Discovery Channel (USA), and other networks, co-produced with Close Up Films, Toronto.
- One Warm Line: The Legacy of Stan Rogers (1988) - One-hour produced for CBC, and broadcast by Bravo, Vision, and many other Canadian broadcasters.
- Stepdancing: Portrait of a Remarried Family (1987) - One-hour produced for TVO.
- Fragile Harvest (1985) - One-hour produced for CBC’s The Nature of Things and the NFB.
- Joe David: Spirit of the Mask (1982) Produced for CBC.
- Childhood's End (1981) - Produced for TVO.

== Interactive Media ==
Kensington Communications has been recognized for its early work using interactive and digital techniques in documentary storytelling. Beginning in the late 1990s, the company incorporated web-based platforms and mobile applications into its projects at a time when interactive documentary formats were still emerging within the broader media industry. These initiatives have included non-linear storytelling systems, user-driven content navigation, augmented reality and the integration of interactive tools for locative documentary.

Through projects such as "River of Sand Online", "The Sacred Balance Online", "Diamond Road Online", "City Sonic", "ScopifyROM", and "Risk Navigator", the company contributed to the development of documentary-related interactive media by combining traditional linear non-fiction storytelling with digital interactivity. These projects in their time reflected broader shifts in documentary practice toward participatory, educational, and multi-platform forms of audience engagement.

=== River of Sand Online (1998) ===
During filming of "River of Sand" in Mali, Kensington developed an accompanying website that was designed to complement the film, providing information on Mali's geography, history, and culture, as well as additional material on the people and locations featured in the documentary.

The interactive component incorporated daily online phone calls when users could check in with the production team, and explore photographs, maps, audio clips, and educational resources intended to deepen their understanding of the places and issues explored in the film. Users could navigate thematic sections and access background information on Malian music and society. The project was an early exploration of transmedia documentary storytelling and was intended for use by both general audiences and educators interested in African culture and international development.

=== The Sacred Balance Online (2003) ===
Released alongside the documentary series "The Sacred Balance", the accompanying website provided educational and supplementary multimedia materials based on the themes explored in the program. Drawing on the work of Canadian environmentalist David Suzuki, the platform presented interactive content concerning ecology, biodiversity, and humanity's relationship with the natural environment. The project formed part of Kensington Communications' continuing efforts to expand documentary storytelling beyond conventional linear broadcast formats.

=== Diamond Road Online (2007) ===
"Diamond Road Online" was an interactive documentary website created as a companion to the documentary series "Diamond Road". The platform enabled users to explore hundreds of short clips concerning the global diamond industry through a customized recommendation engine and non-linear interface. Features included user profiles, content recommendations, ratings, and the ability to assemble personalized viewing paths and storylines. This innovative project was designed to present multiple perspectives on the subject matter through user-directed navigation of documentary content. It won for Excellence in News and Information at the Canadian New Media Awards in 2008 and was invited to a number of prestigious conferences and festivals worldwide like Siggraph 2008.

=== City Sonic (2009) ===
City Sonic unlocks the hidden history of Toronto's music scene through musicians' eyes. In conjunction with the series of 20 short films and 3 x 1/2 hours, Kensington co-produced with White Pine Pictures locative content specifically for smartphones that was unlocked and accessible in the 20 places that were the subject of the artists' stories. This was a very early use of locative documentary principles that were in their infancy at the time.

=== ScopifyROM (2013) ===
"ScopifyROM" was a mobile app developed by Kensington Communications in collaboration with the Royal Ontario Museum. Designed for use within the museum setting, the augmented reality app provided interactive content related to selected artifacts and exhibits. Features included digital reconstructions, visualizations, and additional interpretive materials accessed through mobile devices. The application enabled visitors to obtain supplementary information while viewing exhibits in person and represented an early application of mobile technologies to enhance the museum experience.

=== Risk Navigator (2017) ===
"Risk Navigator" was an interactive mobile app developed as a companion to the documentary "Risk Factor" (also known as "The Truth About Risk"). The app incorporated educational content and interactive tools to allow users to improve risk perception and decision-making. Users could explore different categories of risk through guided modules and assessments connected to themes presented in the documentary. The project extended the documentary's educational objectives through a digital platform designed to encourage audience participation and self-directed learning.

=== Museum Secrets Online (2010 - 2018) ===
Museum Secrets TV series was supported by a rich media interactive website (online from 2010 to 2018) that further explored the stories behind museum treasures through web-exclusive videos, informational content and online games.

== Awards and nominations ==
Year	Award	Category	Work	Result
2017	Canadian Screen Awards	Best Sports Program	The Equalizer	Nominee
2016	49th International Independent Film Festival Worldfest Houston	Platinum Remi Award category Sports	The Equalizer	Won
2016	Paladino d'Oro Sport Film Festival	International Sport Film Festival	The Equalizer	Finalist
2014	Canadian Screen Awards	Best Factual	Museum Secrets	Won
2014	Canadian Screen Awards	Best Editing	Museum Secrets	Won
2013	Canadian Screen Awards	Best Sound in an Information/Documentary Program or Series	Museum Secrets	Won
2013	Canadian Screen Awards	Barbara Sears Award for Best Editorial Research	Raw Opium: Pain, Pleasure, Profits	Nominee
2011	Gemini Awards	Best Cross-Platform Project - Non-Fiction	Museum Secrets	Nominee
2011	Gemini Awards	Barbara Sears Award for Best Editorial Research	Museum Secrets	Nominee
2011	Gemini Awards	Best Original Music Score for a Documentary Program or Series	Museum Secrets	Nominee
2011	Banff World Media Festival	Best Cross-Platform Project	Museum Secrets	Finalist
2008	Gemini Awards	Best Documentary Series	Diamond Road	Won
2008	International Independent Film Festival Worldfest Houston	Platinum Remi Award Best Feature Documentary	Diamond Road	Won
2007	New York Festivals	Docudrama (World Medal)	72 Hours: True Crime	Won
2005	New York Festivals	Docudrama (World Medal)	72 Hours: True Crime	Won
2004	Yorkton Film Festival	Best Documentary, Social/Political (Golden Sheaf Award)	Almost Home: A Sayisi Dene Journey	Won
2004	Yorkton Short Film & Video Festival	NFB Kathleen Shannon Award	Almost Home: A Sayisi Dene Journey	Won
2003	Paris Festival International de l’Emission Scientifique de Télévision	Prix Science & Société	The Sacred Balance (Episode: "The Matrix of Life")	Won
2002	DGC Team Award	Outstanding Achievement in a Documentary	Exhibit A: Secrets of Forensic Science	Nominee
2001	Gemini Awards	Best Direction in a Documentary	Exhibit A: Secrets of Forensic Science	Nominee
2000	Canadian Society of Cinematographers	Best Cinematography in Documentary	Exhibit A: Secrets of Forensic Science	Won
1998	Gemini Awards	Science, Technology, Nature	Separate Lives	Won
1995	Alliance for Children and Television	Best Variety	The Biggest Little Ticket	Won
1994	Yorkton Film and TV Festival	Best Children's/Variety (Golden Sheaf Award)	The Biggest Little Ticket	Won
