= Lee Smart =

Lee Smart may refer to:

- Lee Smart (speedway rider)
- Lee Smart (comedian)
