= Scorn (2000 film) =

2000 TV movie

- Genre: Drama
- Based on: Such a Good Boy by Lisa Hobbs Birnie
- Written by: Andrew Rai Berzins
- Directed by: Sturla Gunnarsson
- Starring: Eric Johnson; Brendan Fletcher; Bill Switzer
- Theme music composer: Jonathan Goldsmith
- Country of origin: Canada
- Original language: English

Production
- Producers: Christian Bruyère; Laszlo Barna; Maryke McEwen
- Cinematography: Tony Westman
- Editor: Jeff Warren
- Running time: 96 minutes
- Production companies: Alliance Atlantis; Barna-Alper Productions

Original release
- Network: CBC
- Release: September 24, 2000

Scorn is a Canadian dramatic television film directed by Sturla Gunnarsson. It dramatizes the true story of Darren Huenemann, a gay teenager from Victoria, British Columbia, who manipulated his classmates Derik Lord and David Muir into murdering his mother Sharon and grandmother Doris in his grandmothers's Tsawwassen home in 1990.

The film stars Eric Johnson as Huenemann, Brendan Fletcher as Lord, Bill Switzer as Muir, Kelly Rowan as Sharon and Pam Hyatt as Doris, as well as Emily Hampshire, Michael Hogan, Jesse Cadotte, Jerry Wasserman, Bill Dow and Hrothgar Mathews in supporting roles.

The film premiered theatrically at the 2000 Vancouver International Film Festival, and received a followup theatrical screening at the 2001 Victoria Film Festival, before being broadcast by CBC Television on March 18, 2001.

== Production ==
The film was based in part on Lisa Hobbs Birnie's non-fiction book Such a Good Boy, as well as direct personal interviews of Huenemann by screenwriter Andrew Rai Berzins at Stony Mountain Penitentiary.

Around the time of the film's premiere, Atom Egoyan revealed that he had considered making his own film about Huenemann, but had decided against it because as a former resident of Victoria who personally knew many of the locations tied to the story, he felt like he couldn't distance himself enough from it to view it objectively.

It faced minor controversy for a scene which briefly depicted Huenemann and his boyfriend Matt (Cadotte) in bed together, with their nude buttocks visible but no private parts. The CBC permitted the nude scene to be broadcast, but required Gunnarsson to remove usages of the word "fuck" from the dialogue. Both theatrical screenings were also picketed by Lord's parents, who were still proclaiming their son's innocence of the murder, but no legal injunctions were sought or given against the film's distribution.

== Awards ==
| Award | Date of ceremony | Category | Nominees | Result | Reference |
|---|---|---|---|---|---|
| Gemini Awards | October 29, 2001 | Best Television Movie | Christian Bruyère, Laszlo Barna, Maryke McEwen | Won | |
| Gemini Awards | October 29, 2001 | Best Actor in a Dramatic Program or Miniseries | Eric Johnson | Nominated | |
| Gemini Awards | October 29, 2001 | Best Direction in a Dramatic Program or Mini-Series | Sturla Gunnarsson | Nominated | |
| Gemini Awards | October 29, 2001 | Best Writing in a Dramatic Program or Miniseries | Andrew Rai Berzins | Nominated | |
| Gemini Awards | October 29, 2001 | Best Original Music Score for a Program or Mini-Series | Jonathan Goldsmith | Nominated | |
| Gemini Awards | October 29, 2001 | Best Sound Editing in a Dramatic Program or Series | Devan Kraushar, Cam Wagner, Jacqueline Cristianini, Kirby Jinnah | Nominated | |
| Writers Guild of Canada | 2001 | WGC Screenwriting Award | Andrew Rai Berzins | Won | |
