= Great Canadian =

Great Canadian may refer to:

- Great Canadian Beer Festival
- Great Canadian Food Show
- Great Canadian Entertainment
- Great Canadian Theatre Company
- Great Canadian Wrestling
