= List of television programs broadcast by Xbox Live =

This is a list of programs currently and soon to be broadcast by Xbox Live; most are viewed via IPTV or video on demand applications (such as sporting events via the ESPN application), while others, such as Majors Minute, are streamed by Xbox Live. However, most events are not available in all regions.

== Xbox Live original programming ==
- Blake's 7 (starting TBA)
- Every Street United (starting TBA)
- Halo: The Television Series (starting 2017)
- Humans (starting TBA)
- The LeBrons (2012–present)
- Life's Little Miracles (starting TBA)
- Miss United Continent (2013–present)
- The Music Box (2013–present)

== News programs ==
- NBC Nightly News (2009–present)
- Today (2009–present)

== Sports ==
- Major League Baseball (2011–present)
- National Basketball Association (2011–present)
- National Football League (2013–present)
- National Hockey League (2013–present)
- Ultimate Fighting Championship (2011–present)
- WWE (2013–present)

=== Association football ===
- UEFA Euro: 2012, 2016
- FIFA Confederations Cup: 2013
- FIFA U-17 World Cup: 2011
- FIFA U-20 World Cup: 2011
- FIFA Women's World Cup: 2011
- FIFA U-17 Women's World Cup: 2014
- FIFA U-20 Women's World Cup: 2014
- FIFA World Cup: 2014
- Copa América: 2015, 2019, 2023, 2027

=== College football ===
- ACC: 2011–present
- Big Ten Conference: 2011–present
- Big 12: 2011–present
- Big East: 2011–present
- Bowl Championship Series: January 2011–2014
- Bowl games: 2010–present (contracts with individual bowl games; the first live college football game telecast on ESPN was the 1982 Independence Bowl, Kansas St. vs. Wisconsin)
- Brigham Young University: 2011–present
- C-USA: 2011–present
- MAC: 2011–present
- MEAC: 2011–present
- NCAA Division I FCS (formerly Division I-AA), Division II, and Division III playoffs (selected games) and championship games.: 2011–present
- Pac-12: 2011–present
- SEC: 2011–present
- Sun Belt: 2011–present
- Turkey Day Classic: 2011–present
- WAC: 2011–present

=== Tennis ===
==== Tennis Grand Slams ====
- Australian Open (2011–present)
- French Open (2011–present)
- US Open (2011–present)
- Wimbledon (2011–present)

==== Other ====
Xbox Live simulcasts the ATP Masters 1000 tournaments in Indian Wells, Miami, Toronto/Montreal and Cincinnati.

== Beauty pageants ==
- Miss Teen USA (2012–present)

== Music ==
- American Top 40 (2012-present)

== Family entertainment ==
- Sesame Street (2012–present)
- Tiny Toon Adventures (2010-present)

== Former programs ==
On May 2, 2012, it was announced that Inside Xbox would be discontinued to focus more on its entertainment features.

- Major's Minute (2006–2012)
- Official Xbox Magazine (2007–2012)
- Sent U a Message (2008–2012)
- Xbox 101 (2008–2012)
- Insider Moves (2008–2012)
- IGN Strategize (2008–2012)
- Hot Apps (2010–2012)
- Tech With Tina (2010–2012)
- The Family Show (2010–2012)
- The Kinect Show (2010–2012)
