= City Sonic =

Canadian documentary series

Featured Artists
- Geddy Lee, Cancer Bats, Brian Borcherdt (Holy Fuck), Tyler Stewart (Barenaked Ladies), Justin Rutledge, Bazil Donovan (Blue Rodeo), Jason Collett, Care Failure (Die Mannequin), Danko Jones, Damian Abraham (Fucked Up), Sarah Slean, Lioness, Serena Ryder, D-Sisive, Divine Brown, Woodhands, Brendan Canning (Broken Social Scene), Sebastien Grainger (Death from Above 1979), Colin Munroe, Tony Dekker (Great Lake Swimmers), and Laura Barrett and Martin Tielli

Featured Directors
- Bruce MacDonald, George Vale, Rob Pilichowski, Anita Doron, Charles Officer, Peter Lynch and Robert Lang

Producer
- Robert Lang (producer)

Executive Producers
- Janice Dawe; Robert Lang (producer); Peter Raymont

Interactive Producers
- David Oppenheim; Cameron Mitchell

City Sonic is a documentary series about Toronto-based musicians and the places that influenced their music. The first five City Sonic films were previewed at Toronto's 2009 North by North East Music and Film Festival, and subsequently 10 films screened at Toronto International Film Festival and the 2010 Hot Docs Canadian International Documentary Festival.

== Films ==
City Sonic is a series of 20 short films about places where music happens. Directed by Canadian filmmakers and co-produced by White Pine Pictures and Kensington Communications, each City Sonic film features one artist and one Toronto location that influenced them and their work. It was produced as 4 half hours for broadcast and was a leader in the development of its locative functionality through its smart phone mobile app.

- Cancer Bats at Adrift Clubhouse
- Care Failure (Die Mannequin) at 102.1 The Edge
- Barenaked Ladies at Ultasound Showbar
- Brian Borcherdt (Holy Fuck) at Sneaky Dee's
- Danko Jones at Maple Leaf Gardens
- Jason Collett in Kensington Market
- Justin Rutledge and Bazil Donovan (Blue Rodeo) at The Cameron House
- Damian Abraham (Fucked Up) at Rotate This
- D-Sisive at Planet Mars
- Serena Ryder at the Dakota Tavern
- Geddy Lee (Rush) at Massey Hall
- Tony Dekker (Great Lake Swimmers) at Spadina Subway Station
- Laura Barrett with Martin Tielli at the Art Gallery of Ontario
- Woodhands at the Don Valley Brick Works
- Sarah Slean at The Rivoli
- Lioness at the Masonic Temple
- Divine Brown at The Rex Hotel
- Brendan Canning (Broken Social Scene) at the Drake Hotel
- Colin Munroe at the Revival Bar
- Sebastien Grainger (Death From Above 1979) at the El Mocambo

== Directors ==
- Anita Doron
- Peter Lynch
- Robert Lang
- Bruce McDonald
- Charles Officer
- Rob Pilichowski
- George Vale
