= Ichannel =

ichannel
- ichannel logo
- Country: Canada
- Broadcast area: National
- Headquarters: Toronto, Ontario

Programming
- Picture format: 480i (SDTV)

Ownership
- Owner: Stornoway Communications

History
- Launched: September 7, 2001
- Closed: August 15, 2016

ichannel was a Canadian English-language Category A specialty channel owned by Stornoway Communications. Its programs focused on public, social, and current affairs. Its programming included films, documentaries, and talk shows.

== History ==
Original logo used from 2001 - 2004

In November 2000, a partnership between Stornoway Communications and Cogeco was granted a category 1 television broadcasting licence by the Canadian Radio-television and Telecommunications Commission (CRTC) called The Issues Channel, described as "a national English-language specialty television service dedicated to public affairs programming, that will examine matters of public interest and concern in an engaging format."

The channel was launched on September 7, 2001 as ichannel.

In January 2004, the CRTC approved an application for Stornoway to acquire Cogeco's interest in the service.

On August 15, 2016, iChannel ceased broadcasting, after Stornoway requested that the CRTC revoke its license “due to the inability to secure sustainable packaging by Canadian BDUs [Beoadcasting Distribution Undertakings].” The station's ad revenues had fallen from $405,966 in 2012 to $78,798 in 2015.

== See also ==
- CPAC
