= Raw Opium =

- Promotional poster
- Directed by: Peter Findlay
- Written by: Peter Findlay, Robert Lang
- Produced by: Robert Lang
- Distributed by: Kensington Communications
- Release date: May 7, 2011 (DOXA)
- Running time: 84 minutes
- Country: Canada
- Language: English

Raw Opium is a 2011 documentary film produced by Robert Lang of Kensington Communications, directed by Peter Findlay and written by Peter Findlay and Robert Lang. The documentary examines the worldwide opium trade and the vast criminal and public health issues that have arisen from it.

Raw Opium is a journey around the world and through time, where conflicting forces do battle over the narcotic sap of the opium poppy. From an opium master in southeast Asia to a UN drug enforcement officer on the border of Afghanistan hunting down the smugglers of Central Asia; from a former Indian government Drug Czar and opium farmer to a crusading Vancouver doctor and Portuguese street worker who daily confront the realities of drug addiction.

Shown is the pivotal role that has been played by the opium poppy, not just in the lives of people who grow, manufacture and use it, but also in the increasingly-tense sphere of international relations. In the process, assumptions about addiction and the war on drugs are challenged.

== People in the documentary ==
- Christer Brannerud: Project lead, United Nations Office on Drugs and Crime (UNODC), Tajikistan
- Dr. Gabor Maté: Physician, Author, Public Speaker, Vancouver, Canada
- Peter Dale Scott: Author and Commentator, Berkeley, USA
- Larry Mendosa: Special Agent, Drug Enforcement Administration, USA
- Gwynne Dyer: Author, Historian, Journalist, London, UK
- Misha Glenny: Journalist, Author, UK
- Darwin Fisher: Intake manager, Insite, Vancouver, Canada
- Derek Thomas: Client at Insite, Vancouver, Canada
- Eugene Oscapella: Barrister and Solicitor, Ottawa, Canada
- Pam Squire, MD.: Doctor, Pain Management Specialist, Vancouver, Canada
- Daniel Reid: Author and Historian, Australia
- Peresia and Danglesia Kathak: Opium farmers, Arunachal Pradesh, India
- Romesh Bhattacharji: Former Narcotics Commissioner, India
- Rui Reis: Outreach worker, Institute on Drugs and Drug Addiction, Lisbon, Portugal

== Broadcasts ==
The film was adapted into a 2-part TV documentary, which has been shown in several countries:

- 2-part documentary, broadcast, online streamed with a live chat, TVO, Ontario, Canada
- 2-part documentary, broadcast on CTV Two, Alberta, Canada
- Feature French version broadcast on Canal D throughout French Canada
- 2-part documentary broadcast on SBS TV, Australia
- Feature documentary broadcast in Germany, France, Switzerland on ZDF and Arte
