= My Left Breast =

- Directed by: Gerry Rogers
- Produced by: Paul Pope
- Starring: Gerry Rogers; Peg Norman
- Cinematography: Nigel Markham; Peg Norman; Gerry Rogers
- Edited by: Terre Nash
- Music by: Paul Steffler
- Production company: Pope Productions
- Release date: 2000
- Country: Canada
- Language: English

My Left Breast is a 2000 Canadian documentary film, directed by Gerry Rogers. Starring Rogers and her partner Peg Norman, the film documents Rogers' experience being diagnosed with and treated for breast cancer.

The film was screened theatrically at selected documentary and LGBT film festivals in Canada and the United States, but was distributed primarily as an episode of the CBC Television documentary series The Passionate Eye. Rogers' tour to promote the film included an appearance on The Rosie O'Donnell Show in December 2000.

== Awards ==
The film won the award for Best Canadian Documentary at the 2001 Hot Docs Canadian International Documentary Festival, the award for Best Canadian Film at the 2001 Inside Out Film and Video Festival, and the Gemini Award for Best History/Biography Documentary Program at the 16th Gemini Awards in 2001.

The film also won awards from the Dallas OUT TAKES Lesbian and Gay Film Festival and the Boulder Gay and Lesbian Film Festival in 2001 and 2002.

== See also ==
- List of LGBT films directed by women
