= Tamara Hickey =

Canadian actress

- Born: Halifax, Nova Scotia, Canada
- Occupation: Actress
- Years active: 1998-present

Tamara Hickey is a Canadian film and television actress.

== Early life and education ==
Born in Halifax, Nova Scotia, she was raised primarily in Charlottetown, Prince Edward Island. She studied at Ryerson University and the Royal Academy of Dramatic Art.

== Career ==
Hickey began her career with small roles in television films and was an understudy for a Toronto production of Beauty and the Beast, before getting her first lead role in The Associates. Following the cancellation of The Associates, she was cast in Blue Murder as the new lead detective after Maria del Mar left the series. After completing filming on Blue Murder, she starred in a production of John Krizanc's play Tamara for Toronto's Necessary Angel Theatre.

She has also had guest roles in Doc, Puppets Who Kill, This Is Wonderland, One Life to Live, Rent-a-Goalie and Army Wives, and appeared in the television miniseries Olive Kitteridge and The Secret Life of Marilyn Monroe and the films It All Happens Incredibly Fast, Against the Ropes, In Your Eyes, The Judge, Irrational Man, We Don't Belong Here and The Equalizer 2.

== Filmography ==
=== Film ===
Year	Title	Role	Notes
2002	It All Happens Incredibly Fast	Janine Fontanta	
2004	Against the Ropes	Megan the Reporter	
2014	In Your Eyes	Dorothy	
2014	The Judge	Amy Palmer	
2015	Irrational Man	Professor in Cafeteria	
2016	Good Kids	Nora's Mom	
2017	We Don't Belong Here	Mrs. B	
2017	Chappaquiddick	Marilyn Richards	
2018	The Equalizer 2	Grace Braelick	
2021	John and the Hole	Paula	
2021	Don't Look Up	Reporter Christy	Uncredited
2021	Mother/Android	Mrs Olsen	

=== Television ===
Year	Title	Role	Notes
1999	Spenser: Small Vices	Trish	Television film
2000	The Wonderful World of Disney	Pretty Elevator Woman	Episode: "Angels in the Infield"
2000	Code Name: Eternity	Bartender	Episode: "24 Hours"
2001	Laughter on the 23rd Floor	Waitress	Television film
2001	Dying to Dance	Caryn	Television film
2002	The Associates	Robyn Parsons	13 episodes
2003	Blue Murder	Det. Karen Gillam	13 episodes
2004	Doc	Tabitha	Episode: "Leader of the Band"
2004	Puppets Who Kill	Doctor Sheila	Episode: "Cuddles the Demon"
2004	This Is Wonderland	Jillian Nisker	Episode #1.11
2007	One Life to Live	Nancy	3 episodes
2007	Rent-a-Goalie	Dahlia	Episode: "Gnarsty Snartch"
2008	Army Wives	Beverly Jacop	Episode: "The Hero Returns"
2013	The Makeover	TV Reporter	Television film
2013	Gilded Lilys	Grace	Television film
2014	Chasing Life	Tasha	Episode: "Pilot"
2014	Olive Kitteridge	Suzanne's Sister	Episode: "Incoming Tide"
2015	The Secret Life of Marilyn Monroe	Patricia Kennedy Lawford	2 episodes
2016	Bull	Gail Peters	Episode: "The Necklace"
2020	Defending Jacob	Toby	4 episodes

== Awards and nominations ==
Year	Award	Category	Work	Result	Ref.
2001	Gemini Awards	Best Performance by an Actress in a Continuing Leading Dramatic Role	The Associates	Nominated	
2002	Gemini Awards	Best Actress in a Dramatic Series	The Associates	Nominated	
2003	Gemini Awards	Best Actress in a Dramatic Series	Blue Murder	Nominated	
