= Joshua Klein =

American technologist

Joshua Klein (born 1974 in Seattle, Washington) is an American technologist and author known for exploring systems thinking across multiple disciplines. He gained attention for a project to train crows to collect coins; he has also written three books (one science-fiction novel and two business books), been involved with several startups, worked with U.S. government and intelligence organizations, and spoken at conferences including Davos and TED. He's also a member of the creative collective Group of Humans.

Klein advises senior executives on technology strategy and serves as acting CEO of Indigometrics, a culture measurement and management analytics company.

== Television ==
Klein's first television series, The Link, premiered on The National Geographic Channel on Friday, May 25, 2012. The show is about the history of human innovation, tracing the connections between the world's greatest inventions in art, science, medicine, finance and more, from ancient times up to the present day. Each episode spans a dozen or so technologies, and traces how each one was dependent on the capabilities provided by the one before it.

After that, Klein hosted a short series called Smart China, debuting on Discovery Channel Saturday September 3, 2016. The series covers technological innovations in China and their impact on the environment, urban development, transportation, and other areas.

Klein also co-produced the series Game Vision, for Discovery Channel, which debuted on Saturday September 16, 2017. The series is focused on how games have evolved throughout history and are likely to evolve into the future, with an emphasis on sociocultural impact, technology, and the ways that games bleed over into our everyday lives.

== Books ==
His first book, the cyberpunk novel Roo'd (2007), was released under a Creative Commons Share-Alike license.

In 2010 he co-authored Hacking Work (ISBN 159184357X), a business book about employees using creative problem solving in the workplace. The book was discussed by outlets including the Harvard Business Review, Fast Company, and Boing Boing.

His book You Are the Product: How to Survive—and Thrive—in the Era of Reputation Economics (2015) examines reputation economies and the role of social software. It was covered by business outlets including Fortune, Inc., The Huffington Post, and MarketWatch, and discussed on radio programmes such as NPR and KUOW.

== Crows ==
In 2008 he presented a thesis project at New York University's Interactive Telecommunications Program (ITP) exploring whether synanthropic species—animals that live near human habitats—could be trained to perform tasks that benefit human environments. The demonstration involved a device designed to dispense peanuts and coins in stages intended to encourage crows to drop coins into a slot. Klein later spoke about the project at the TED conference and referenced the concept of synanthropy in a Make Magazine article.

In April 2009, The New York Times issued a correction to its December 2008 coverage, noting that the experiments did not succeed in training crows to drop coins into a slot. Klein later posted a response on his website addressing the correction.

== Hacking ==
Klein often discusses hacking as a way to rethink existing systems for mutual benefit. He cites examples such as releasing a novel under a Creative Commons license, projects involving training crows, and advocating changes to workplace culture.
