= The Associates (Canadian TV series) =

- Genre: Legal drama
- Created by: Greg Ball; Steve Blackman; Alyson Feltes
- Starring: Demore Barnes; Shaun Benson; Tamara Hickey; Gabriel Hogan; Jennie Raymond; R. H. Thomson; Ian D. Clark
- Composer: Robert Carli
- Country of origin: Canada
- Original language: English
- No. of seasons: 2
- No. of episodes: 30

Production
- Executive producer: Alyson Feltes
- Producer: Brian Dennis
- Production locations: Toronto, Ontario, Canada
- Running time: 60 minutes
- Production company: Alliance Atlantis Communications

Original release
- Network: CTV
- Release: January 16, 2001 – May 17, 2002

The Associates is a Canadian television drama series that aired on CTV in 2001 and 2002. The show centred on the professional and personal lives of five junior associate lawyers at the Toronto office of the multinational law firm of Young, Barnsworth & King.

The show's cast included Demore Barnes as Benjamin Hardaway, Shaun Benson as Jonah Gleason, Tamara Hickey as Robyn Parsons, Gabriel Hogan as Mitch Barnsworth and Jennie Raymond as Amy Kassan, as well as R.H. Thomson as Angus MacGregor, the firm's senior partner, and Sean Sullivan as Dale Friesen, the associates' supervising partner. The show also sometimes made differences between Canadian and American law into plot points, notably by writing both Robyn Parsons and Benjamin Hardaway as American transplants who sometimes ran into trouble because of their greater familiarity with U.S. courtroom procedure.

The series was co-created by Greg Ball and Steve Blackman, themselves former associates at a law firm in Edmonton who based it on some of their own experiences.

The show was successful in its first two years of ratings, but due to tax cutbacks from the government, the show could not continue into a third season.

== Critical response ==
John Doyle of The Globe and Mail panned the first episode, but wrote that the series improved significantly thereafter. He criticized Hogan's performance as Mitch, writing that "his accent wobbles and wanders all over the United Kingdom and Ireland and he looks nothing like anyone's picture of an upper-class, well-connected Brit lawyer. Instead he looks like the younger sibling of one of the Gallagher brothers from Oasis, with a bad, blond dye job." He opined that the show's real saving grace was Hickey's portrayal of Robyn, whose brashness in the first episode was gradually revealed as a front for insecurity and shyness, making her the show's most relatable character and grounding it the same way Patrick McKenna's Marty had served as the "everyman" anchor in Traders.

Dan Brown of the National Post criticized the characters of Benjamin Hardaway and Amy Kassan as unsympathetic, writing that Barnes played Benjamin like he was auditioning for the role of Tuvok in Star Trek: Voyager.

Tony Atherton of the Ottawa Citizen similarly wrote that the first episode was weak, but that the series improved over the course of the season.

== Awards ==
Awards and nominations received by The Associates
Award	Year	Category	Nominee(s)	Result	Ref.
Gemini Awards	2001	Best Dramatic Series	Brian Dennis, Anne Marie La Traverse, Steve Blackman, Greg Ball, Alyson Feltes, Maureen McKeon	Nominated	
Gemini Awards	2001	Best Actor, Drama Series	Gabriel Hogan	Nominated	
Gemini Awards	2001	Best Actor, Drama Series	Demore Barnes	Nominated	
Gemini Awards	2001	Best Actress, Drama Series	Tamara Hickey	Nominated	
Gemini Awards	2001	Best Supporting Actor, Drama Series or Program	Sean Sullivan	Nominated	
Gemini Awards	2001	Best Supporting Actress, Drama Series or Program	Marnie McPhail	Nominated	
Gemini Awards	2001	Best Photography in a Dramatic Program or Series	Philip Earnshaw	Nominated	
Gemini Awards	2002	Best Actor, Drama Series	Demore Barnes	Nominated	
Gemini Awards	2002	Best Actress, Drama Series	Tamara Hickey	Nominated	
Gemini Awards	2002	Best Supporting Actress, Drama Series or Program	Marnie McPhail	Nominated	
Gemini Awards	2002	Best Supporting Actress, Drama Series or Program	Rebecca Jenkins	Nominated	
Gemini Awards	2002	Best Guest Actor, Drama Series	Michael Riley	Nominated	
Gemini Awards	2002	Best Direction in a Dramatic Series	Kelly Makin	Nominated	
Gemini Awards	2002	Best Writing in a Dramatic Series	Maureen McKeon	Nominated	
Gemini Awards	2002	Best Makeup	Marilyn O'Quinn, Cindy Lou Tache	Nominated	

== Episodes ==
=== Season 1: 2001 ===
No. overall	No. in season	Title	Directed by	Written by	Original release date
1	1	"Headfirst Into Hell"	David Wu	Greg Ball	January 16, 2001
Five young lawyers are starting their first day as junior associates at Young, Barnsworth & King, on the same day that three of the firm's senior partners are arrested for stock fraud.
2	2	"Disclosure"	George Bloomfield	Greg Ball	January 23, 2001
3	3	"Ten"	Scott Smith	Paul Aitken	January 30, 2001
4	4	"Encumbered"	George Bloomfield	Maureen McKeon	February 6, 2001
5	5	"CYA: Cover Your Ass"	Michael DeCarlo	Greg Ball	February 20, 2001
6	6	"Sue Everybody"	E. Jane Thompson	Paul Aitken	February 27, 2001
7	7	"E Pluribus Unum"	Eli Cohen	Michelle Lovretta	March 6, 2001
8	8	"Don't Ask Don't Tell"	Unknown	Alyson Feltes	March 13, 2001
9	9	"Family Values"	George Bloomfield	Unknown	March 27, 2001
10	10	"Care & Control"	Jerry Ciccoritti	Michelle Lovretta	April 3, 2001
11	11	"Killing the Rat"	E. Jane Thompson	Paul Aitken	April 10, 2001
12	12	"Sirens"	Unknown	Unknown	April 10, 2001
13	13	"Should I Stay or Should I Go?"	David Wu	Alyson Feltes	April 17, 2001

=== Season two ===
#	Title	Directed by	Written by	Original release date
1	"Go Heart or Go Home"	George Bloomfield	Maureen McKeon	January 18, 2002
2	"Your Place or Mine?"	E. Jane Thompson	Unknown	January 25, 2002
3	"Take This Job..."	Unknown	Unknown	February 1, 2002
4	"The Hitler Paradox"	Kelly Makin	Unknown	February 8, 2002
5	"Walking the Line"	Unknown	Unknown	February 15, 2002
6	"Soulmates"	Paul Fox	Gregory Nelson	February 22, 2002
7	"Revelations"	E. Jane Thompson	Unknown	March 1, 2002
8	"Mea Culpa"	Kelly Makin	Unknown	March 8, 2002
9	"Liar, Liar"	Gary Harvey	Unknown	March 15, 2002
10	"Parents: Who Needs 'Em?"	Unknown	Unknown	March 22, 2002
11	"Freedomia"	Philip Earnshaw	Paul Aitken	March 29, 2002
12	"Spare the Rod"	Paul Fox	Gregory Nelson	April 5, 2002
13	"Heart's Desire"	Unknown	Unknown	April 12, 2002
14	"Definitely Maybe"	Unknown	Unknown	April 19, 2002
15	"Winner Take All"	Gary Harvey	Unknown	May 3, 2002
16	"All About C"	Unknown	Michelle Lovretta	May 10, 2002
17	"Something About Love"	Kelly Makin	Unknown	May 17, 2002
