= Museum Secrets =

- Title screen
- Genre: Documentary history
- Narrated by: Colm Feore
- Country of origin: Canada
- Original languages: English, French
- No. of seasons: 3
- No. of episodes: 22

Production
- Executive producer: Robert Lang
- Running time: 44 minutes
- Production company: Kensington Communications, Inc.

Original release
- Network: History
- Release: January 6, 2011 – May 2, 2014

Museum Secrets is a TV series on History Television in Canada and a website with videos and games exploring the world's renowned museums and their most enigmatic objects. Narrated by Canadian actor Colm Feore, the TV series ran for three seasons. Museum Secrets was produced by Kensington Communications Inc.

The show won two awards at the Canadian Screen Awards in 2014 for Best Factual Series and Best Picture Editing in an Information Program or Series

The Royal Ontario Museum held a special exhibit during winter 2011, featuring objects from the Museum Secrets series. Several Canadian newspapers previewed the exhibit: National Post, Toronto Sun, Torontoist and Toronto Star.

== Broadcasts ==
History Television in Canada
Historia in French Canada
BBC Knowledge in Australia and New Zealand
Yesterday channel (UKTV) in the UK
National Geographic Channel (Canada)
Smithsonian Channel (US)
TVB J2 (Hong Kong)
Canal Encuentro (Argentina)

== Seasons ==
Each season, the series travels to the world's greatest museums in search of the mysteries behind their objects.

=== Season 1 episodes ===
- "Inside the Royal Ontario Museum" (Toronto, Canada)
- "Inside the Natural History Museum" (London, United Kingdom)
- "Inside the Louvre" (Paris, France)
- "Inside the Vatican Museums" (Rome, Italy)
- "Inside the Egyptian Museum" (Cairo, Egypt)
- "Inside the Metropolitan Museum of Art" (New York City, United States)

=== Season 2 episodes ===
- "Inside the Hermitage Museum" (St. Petersburg, Russia)
- "Inside the Topkapı Palace Museum" (Istanbul, Turkey)
- "Inside the National Archaeological Museum of Athens" (Athens, Greece)
- "Inside the American Museum of Natural History" (New York City, United States)
- "Inside the Imperial War Museum" (London, Duxford and Manchester; United Kingdom)
- "Inside the National Museum of Anthropology" (Mexico City, Mexico)
- "Inside the Pergamon and Neues Museums" (Berlin, Germany)
- "Inside the Kunsthistorisches Museum" (Vienna, Austria)

=== Season 3 episodes ===
- "Inside the Palacio Real de Madrid" (Madrid, Spain)
- "Inside the Israel Museum" (Jerusalem, Israel)
- "Inside the Uffizi Gallery" (Florence, Italy)
- "Inside the State Historical Museum" (Moscow, Russia)
- "Inside the Smithsonian Institution" (Washington D.C., United States)
- "Inside the Château de Versailles" (Versailles, France)
- "Inside the Royal Museums Greenwich" (London, United Kingdom)
- "Inside the Bardo National Museum" (Tunis, Tunisia)

== Interactive ==
The program's website features shorter web videos for the 14 episodes and an object navigator with 90 objects.

== Awards and nominations ==
Canadian Screen Awards, 2014

- Best Factual Series
- Best Picture Editing in an Information Program or Series

History Makers Awards, 2012 (now IMPACT Awards)

- Best Interactive Production
- Most Innovative Production

26th Annual Gemini Awards, 2011

- Best Cross-platform Project Non-fiction (Robert Lang and David Oppenheim)
- Barbara Sears Award for Best Editorial Research (Rebecca Snow)
- Best Original Music Score for a Documentary Program or Series (Eric Cadesky and Nick Dyer)

Interactive Rockie Awards at Banff World Media Festival, 2011

- Best Cross-platform Project
