= NFB =

NFB may refer to:

== Biology ==
- NF-κB, in molecular biology, often written as NF-B
- Neurofeedback, therapy technique that presents the user with realtime feedback on brainwave activity

== Organisations ==
- National Federation of the Blind, American non-profit organization
- National Federation of Builders, British trade association
- National Film Board of Canada, Canada's public film producer and distributor
- Network of Excellence for Functional Biomaterials, research centre based in Galway, Ireland
- N.F.-Board, Non-FIFA football representative organisation

== Other uses ==
- Negative feedback, process of feeding back to the input a part of a system's output, so as to reverse the direction of change of the output
- Noise from the Basement, debut album by Canadian singer Skye Sweetnam
- North Fork Bank, which was acquired by Capital One Bank in 2008
