= Scopify =

Scopify is an interactive mobile app designed to help users explore selects objects in a museum. The first app in this collection is ScopifyROM, designed by Kensington Communications for the Royal Ontario Museum in Toronto. Scopify offers museum visitors a number of tools to investigate the museum piece in front of them and reveal the larger story behind its cultural and historical significance.

ScopifyROM was launched in October 2013 as a free mobile app available for iPhone and Android smart phones. The app is suitable for children and has been positively reviewed by a number of media including CBC, Techvibes, and Newstalk1010.

ScopifyROM was nominated for a Digi Award in 2013 in the category of Best in Mobility. The app was developed with support and the participation of The Ontario Media Development Corporation and with participation from Bell Fund, Ryerson University, RTA Transmedia Centre, Government of Canada and Ontario Centres of Excellence.
