= Alvin Erasga Tolentino =

Canadian choreographer

Alvin Erasga Tolentino is a Filipino Canadian choreographer and dance artist, and the founding Artistic Director of Vancouver, British Columbia's Co.ERASGA Dance.

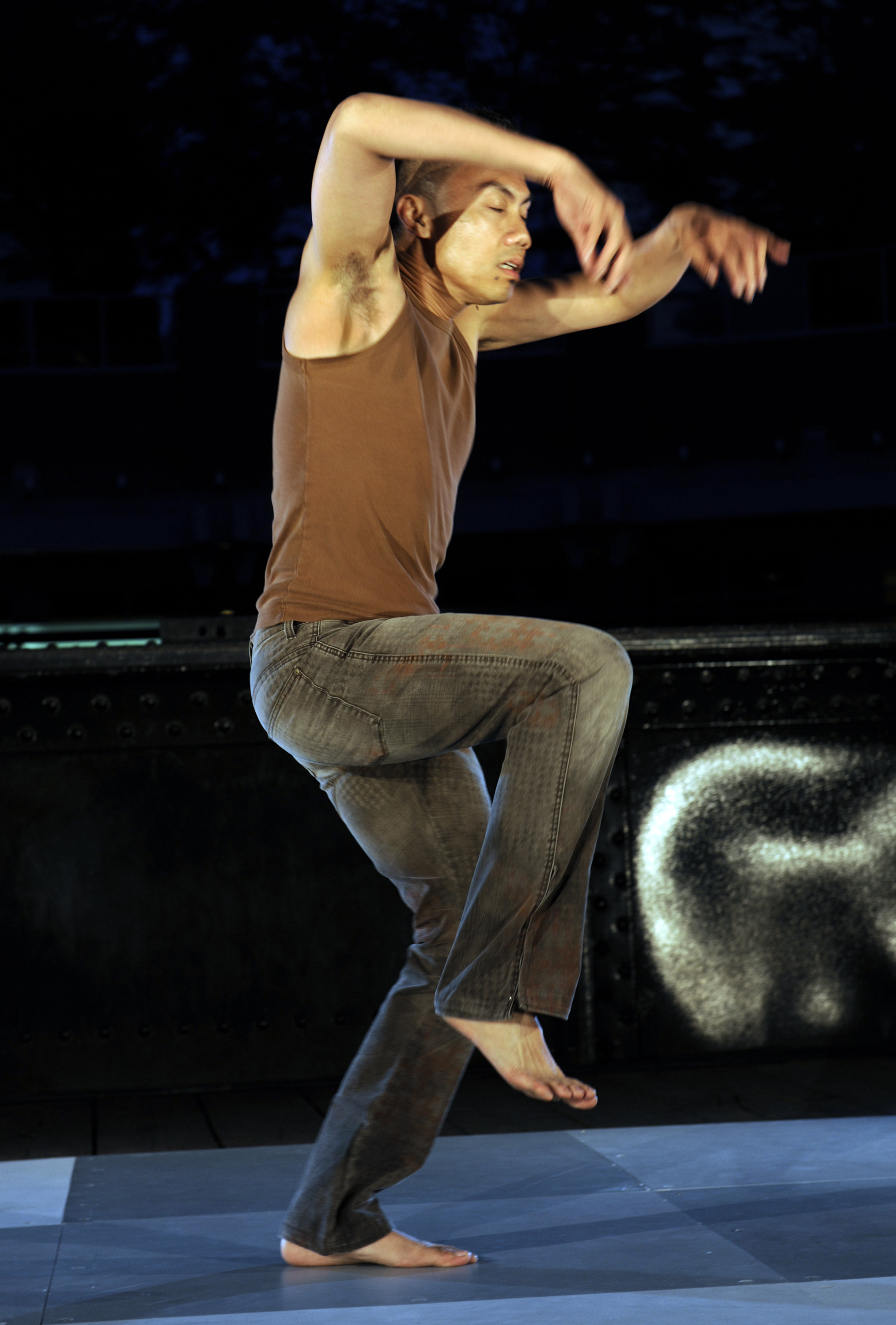
PARADIS 2009, performed/choreographed by Alvin Erasga Tolentino

== Early life and education ==
Alvin Tolentino (October 14, 1969) was born in Manila, Philippines. He studied with the Royal Winnipeg Ballet, at York University in Toronto and at the SUNY Purchase and Limon Institute.

== Career ==
A sought after contemporary dancer in the 1990's, Tolentino worked and interpreted notable dance companies in Canada's West coast that included: EDAM with Peter Bingham, Kokoro Dance with Barbara Bourget and Jay Hirabayashi, Lola Dance with Lola McLaughlin, Kinesis Dance with Paras Terezakis, Karen Jamieson Dance and Mascall Dance.

He founded Co.ERASGA in 1998 and established it as a non-profit dance company in 2000. His choreography is cross-cultural collaboration, hybrid and challenges private and public territory, identity, gender, cultural redress and environmental concerns.

His full-length solo work SOLA which was created for film and garnered international acclaim, nominated and won the Grand Prix International Video Dance Competition for UNESCO in 2002, BC’s Leo Award in 2000, and Canada’s 16th Gemini in 2001.

A trans-continental project Paradise/Paradis between France and Canada in 2008 in collaboration with French composer and musician Emmanuel Mailly received 50 performances in Canada, France, Philippines, China and Thailand.

Tolentino’s Filipino identity and Asian heritage is a major part of his art realized in works as Field 1 for Ballet Philippines and Field for Festival Danse En vol in Brussel (Belgium) in 2003, OrienTik/Portrait in 2005, Colonial in 2014, Mudras and Tracing Malong in Collected Traces and Still here in 2016.

He founded the biennial dance prize the AET Koreograpiya Award in 2014 given to a young Filipino dance artist living in the Philippines. Tolentino is included in the Cultural Centre of the Philippines Encyclopedia of the Philippines Arts (Dance Volume).

Notable works in collaboration with international choreographers has toured in parts of Asia, Europe, South America and Canada: Body glass in 2007 with Toronto's Peter Chin, EXpose in 2011 with Uruguayan Martin Inthamousu, Shifting Geography in 2014 with Germany's Rafaele Giovanolla of CocoonDance, Unwrapping Culture in 2015 with Thai Khon master Pichet Klunchun.

== Works ==
- SOLA (1994-1998)
- BATO/stone (1995-2001)
- Swan Diva (1998)
- VOLT (2002)
- Field 1 (2003 with Ballet Philippines)
- Field (2003)
- MINORI (2003)
- She Said (2003)
- OrienTik/Portrait (2005)
- BODYGlass (2007) (with Peter Chin)
- Paradis/Paradise (2008) (with Emmanuel Mailly)
- ADAMEVE – Man/Woman (2009)
- Shadow Machine (2010) (Carol Sawyer, Ken Gregory, Peter Courtmanche)
- EXpose (2011) (with Martin Inthamoussú)
- Colonial (2012/13) (with Dennis Gupa)
- 25 Gestures for Dancing on the Edge (2013)
- Shifting Geography (2014) (with COCOONDANCE and its Artistic Director Rafaële Giovanola)
- Unwrapping Culture (2015) (with Pichet Klunchun)
- Mudras and Tracing Malong in Collected, Traces, and Still Here (2016)
- Passages of Rhythms (2019) (with Kasandra La China, Sujit Vidya and Gabriel Dharmoo)
- Offering (2020)
- Accumulation (2023–present)
- Fire Air Water Earth (2024)

== Notable Awards ==
In 2010, Alvin Erasga Tolentino was awarded the Vancouver Mayor’s Arts Award for Dance in recognition of his contributions to the field and to Vancouver’s cultural communities.

In 2018, ExploreAsian-Pan Asian Award for contribution in the arts and multiculturalism.

In 2025 Outstanding Filipino in Canada 2025.
