= Birth Stories =

- Genre: Documentary
- Country of origin: Canada
- Original language: English
- No. of seasons: 5
- No. of episodes: 101

Production
- Running time: 30 minutes
- Production companies: Cineflix; Slice; Sky Living

Original release
- Network: Slice
- Release: 2000 – 2004

Birth Stories is a Canadian documentary television series that aired from 2000 to 2004 on Slice. It is produced by Cineflix, Slice and Sky Living.

== Synopsis ==
The series follows the life of women who have babies, showing challenging events in their personal life.
