= Network of Excellence for Functional Biomaterials =

Multidisciplinary research centre at NUI Galway, Ireland

The Network of Excellence for Functional Biomaterials (NFB) is a multidisciplinary research centre which hosts over sixty biologists, chemists, scientists, engineers and clinicians. It is based at the National University of Ireland, Galway, and is directed by Professor Abhay Pandit.

NFB specialises in the development of biomaterials platforms with focus on clinical targets in the areas of musculoskeletal and cardiovascular reconstruction, neural regeneration, soft tissue repair and ophthalmic applications, and is continuously developing functional biomaterials for innovative therapeutic solutions. Functionality for these forms is achieved through custom chemistries which facilitate the attachment of surface tethered moieties or encapsulated therapeutic factors including drugs, genes, cells, growth factors, hormones and other active agents to specific target sites.

While the NFB was initially established in 2003, the centre was incorporated into a Strategic Research Cluster (SRC) in 2007 with funding from Science Foundation Ireland (SFI) to establish collaborative partnerships with national and international universities and industries.

NFB is continuously developing new technologies for use in gene delivery and drug delivery using a wide range of clinically relevant materials including naturally occurring biopolymers such as collagen, elastin, hyaluronic acid and chitosan; synthetic polymers, such as polyethylene glycol (PEG), poly(lactic-co-glycolic acid) (PLGA), poly(lactic acid) (PLA), polyvinyl alcohol (PVA), polydioxanone (PDO), polycaprolactone (PCL); as well as metals, alloys, and ceramics. NFB's researchers employ a range of nanotechnologies and micro-fabrication technologies (bottom-up or top-down) to create complex structures with topographical cues to be used as scaffolds for tissue engineering applications. State-of-the-art facilities are available to evaluate the bulk, surface and biological properties of the produced biomaterials.

== Clinical targets ==
Research activities include prototype development of biomaterials from nano- to micro-scale to deliver therapeutics and diagnostics platforms. Biomaterial platforms at NFB include: scaffolds with instructive biophysical signals, functional nanoparticles, hyper-branched polymers and cell-sheet technologies. The focus is on the use of biomaterials to address key clinical targets as follows:

=== Intervertebral disc regeneration ===
Degeneration of intervertebral disc (IVD) is the main cause of neck and low back pain. The IVD is composed of a gelatinous nucleus pulposus (NP) centre and several surrounding coaxial lamellae that form the inner and outer anulus fibrosus. This unique structural feature allows the IVD to constrain motion at high loads and provide flexibility at low loads. While factors such as abnormal mechanical stresses, biochemical imbalances and nutritional and genetic deficiencies are all reported to play a role in disc degeneration, the natural aging process is also characterised by replacement of the gelatinous nucleus pulposus region of the disc by a less-flexible cartilaginous disc. Current treatments (usually massage, mediations; or acupuncture, manipulation) typically provide short-term relief though invasive surgery can be used as a last resort. NFB strategy is to develop an injectable, functionalised hydrogel loaded with hollow extracellular matrix-based spheres that will restore the mechanical properties of the disc and deliver genes to upregulate extracellular matrix components such as aggrecan that are limited in the diseased state. The spheres will be functionalised using PEG-based hyper-branched polymers, designed and developed in-house, that will enable delivery of specific bioactive molecules and will be delivered by injection directly into the intervertebral column. The findings of fundamental studies currently being carried out at NFB will provide a better understanding of disc degeneration, and will be used to develop new therapeutic interventions to treat intervertebral disc degeneration.

=== Tendon and ligament regeneration ===
Over 17 million tendon operations are performed annually in US alone. Tendon incidents are associated with pain and poor quality of life leading to healthcare costs exceeding US$150 billion in Europe annually. Non-invasive pharmacological strategies show little success, even for small injuries. Intervening replacement is therefore necessary, especially in severe injuries or in cases of large defects. Tendon repair therapies rely heavily on tissue grafts and synthetic biomaterials. However, the limited supply of autografts in severe injuries and in degenerative conditions restricts their use. The use of allografts/xenografts has also been questioned due to poor success rate. Long-term implantation studies have also revealed several drawbacks (e.g. fibrotic encapsulation of the implant) in the use of synthetic materials. To this end, NFB has developed collagen-based nano-textured scaffolds with structural, physical and biological properties similar to those obtained from native supramolecular assemblies. Currently, the influence of scaffold functionalisation with proteoglycans and glycosaminoglycans for functional regeneration is under investigation. NFB is also developing cell-based therapies for tendon repair.

=== Soft tissue repair ===
Wound repair results from a complex and highly orchestrated cellular and biochemical response to tissue injury. Given that the wound repair constitutes a major issue in clinical practice with enormous healthcare costs, NFB is developing several scaffold-based platforms to induce wound healing and to restore function. For example, in cases of chronic healing (e.g. diabetic patients), a fibrin-based scaffold has been used to target a vector encoding eNOS to the wound site. This enhances transfection efficiency of the vector resulting in greater eNOS expression, greater production of NO and better healing in an impaired wound model. Recessive Dystrophic Epidermolysis Bullosa (RDEB) is a particularly severe genetic condition which leads to extensive blistering, repeated wounding and poor healing ability. RDEB is caused by mutations in the COL7A1 gene which results in the reduction or loss of type VII collagen in the skin. One of the projects at NFB aims to deliver the COL7A1 gene encapsulated with a thermal responsive and crosslinkingable hydrogel scaffold to EB cells on the wounds through a non-viral gene-delivery system. NFB is also using natural and synthetic hollow microspheres to encapsulate anti-fibrotic drugs and incorporate them into implantable devices in order to inhibit fibrotic capsule formation. Another strategy developed by NFB in the area of soft tissue augmentation with the use of cholecyst-derived extracellular matrix (CEM). NFB studies have shown it to be very effective in the augmentation of body wall defects primarily because of its strength and inherent biological properties. Optimal stabilisation and functionalisation offers control over degradation that can match the rate of the healing process.

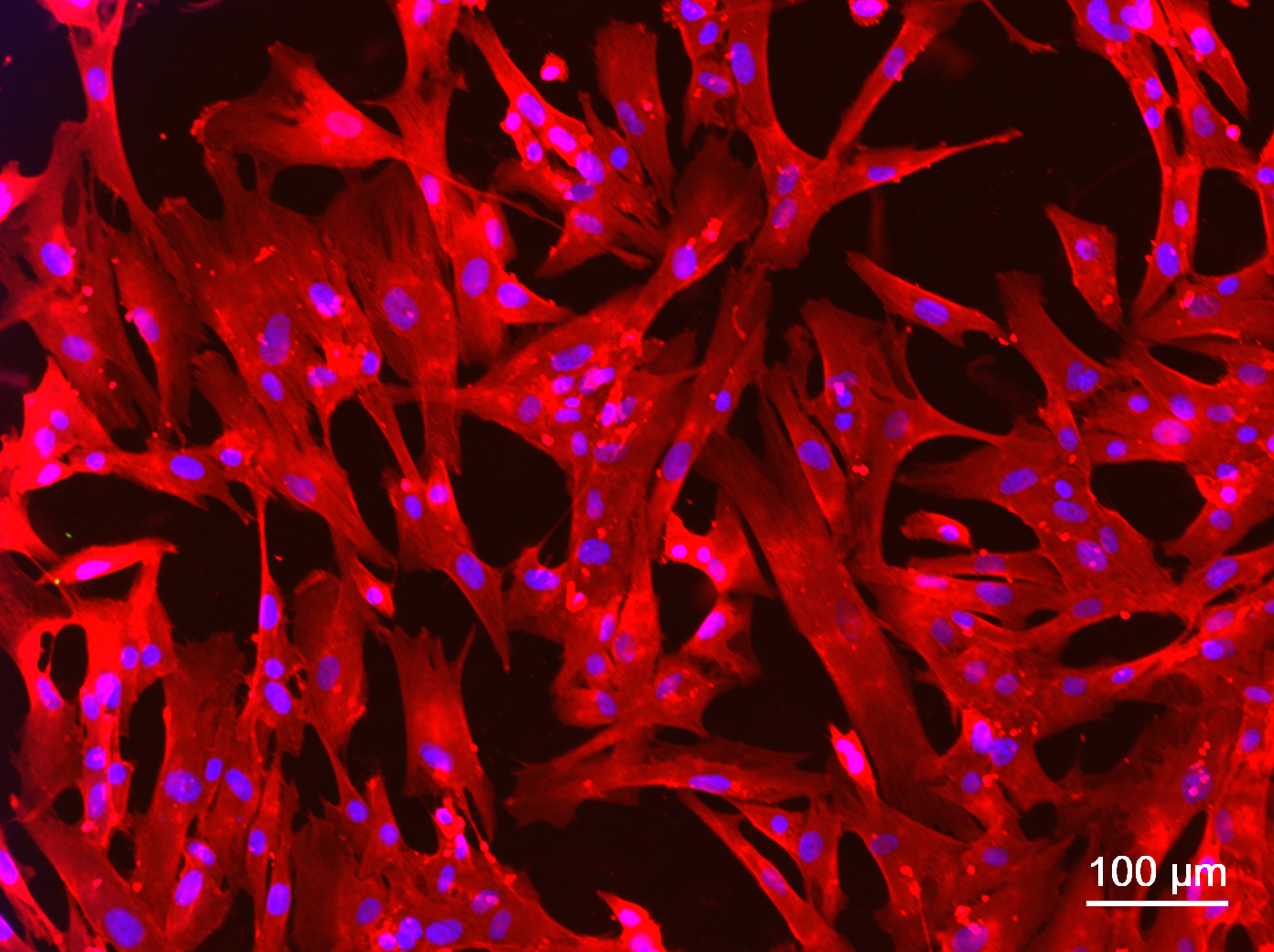
RDEB Fibroblasts transfected with Lipoplexes

=== Hernia repair ===
Hernia operations are among the most common surgical procedures performed today with over 20 million cases annually worldwide. Hernia incidents rates are 27% for males and 3% for females over their lifespan, with complications ranging from associated with mild pain, poor quality-of-life for the patient and in rare causes potentially fatal. According to USA healthcare vital statistics between 2000 and 2009 16438 people died due to hernia related complications. Thus, leading to enormous healthcare costs, exceeding US$48 billion in the US annually. At present, hernia operations rely heavily on non-degradable polypropylene, polytetrafluoroethylene and nylon meshes. Complications associate with meshes include “adverse reactions to the mesh, adhesions (when the loops of the intestines adhere to each other or the mesh), and injuries to nearby organs, nerves or blood vessels. Other complications of hernia repair can occur with or without the mesh, including infection, chronic pain and hernia recurrence.” However, these polymers are often associated with foreign body reaction; implant failure; and hernia recurrence (over 42%). Moreover, leaking chemicals of these polymers are often deleterious to the surrounding cells and tissue and immobilise post-operative drug treatments. NFB develops nano-fibrous meshes with well-defined nanotopography and drug loading capabilities to enhance functional repair.

=== Ophthalmics ===
Corneal diseases are the major cause of vision loss worldwide. Every year approximately 10,000,000 people are affected by various eye disorders and require corneal transplantation. Tissue grafts, including amniotic membranes, constitute the gold standard in clinical practice. However, their use is restricted because they are subject to drawbacks such as immune rejection, possibility of infections and donor shortages, especially after the wide spread of laser operation. Although synthetic materials have been shown to achieve cell infiltration and nerve regeneration, preclinical data demonstrate that such materials are positive for smooth muscle actin staining, which indicates activated myofibroblasts and the potential for scarring. NFB develops scaffolds and scaffold-free approaches for cornea regeneration.

=== Regenerative functional neural constructs ===
Treatment of peripheral nerve injury and spinal cord injury is another important clinical target for NFB. The peripheral nerve system has an intrinsic ability to regenerate itself and does so naturally for small nerve injuries (<5mm in length). Treatments of peripheral nerve injuries that are larger than this relatively short nerve gap require microsurgical intervention. Large gaps require the use of donar nerve (autograft) or regenerative constructs for repair. Current clinically available constructs (hollow nerve guidance conduits) are failing to adequately repair these injuries. Research in the NFB focuses on devising new strategies for repair of peripheral nerve injuries using a combination of biomaterials and tissue engineering methodologies.

Regeneration of the central nervous system is much poorer than the peripheral nervous system and does not show the same capacity to regenerate itself. This is primarily due to the multifaceted nature of spinal cord injury. The multifaceted nature of spinal cord injuries presents a major challenge to therapeutic development however, as primary mechanical trauma to the cord induces secondary injury consisting of a complex cascade of molecular events that lead to the loss of the conductive myelin sheath (myelin degeneration) and the formation of an inhibitory glial scar.

Transplantation of peripheral nerve grafts and/or the introduction of a variety of cell types has resulted in axon regeneration with limited functional improvement after spinal cord injury in animal models, while structural constructs have been shown to aid and direct neurite growth. Molecular therapies that either promote regeneration, such as administration of neurotrophic factors (NGF, NT-3, GDNF), or target deleterious inhibition of regeneration, such as chondroitinase ABC, have also yielded favourable results.

Despite significant progress in the laboratory limited demonstration of functional improvement in in vivo models has prevented regenerative therapies reaching the clinic to date. In order to devise viable treatment for clinical applications, current work in the NFB is combining the positive aspects of various therapeutic approaches.

=== Drug delivery systems for treatment of pain ===
The prevalence of chronic pain in Ireland is estimated at 13% of the total population. Pain impacts negatively on quality of life and ability to conduct everyday activities, with economic implications through loss of time from work. Therapeutic intervention using current pharmaceuticals achieves satisfactory pain relief in less than 50% of chronic pain patients. There is a need to develop novel treatments for pain and to examine the potential for novel drug delivery systems to improve the efficacy of drugs currently available. Appropriate design of drug delivery systems may reduce adverse side-effect profiles, reduce drug degradation and loss, increase bioavailability and target the therapy to the site of interest. Current research at NFB involves the development of drug delivery platforms that facilitates the targeting of analgesic therapies to peripheral sites of action.

=== Neurodegenerative disease ===
Parkinson's disease occurs in a variety of forms and with a largely unknown etiology. However, this disease is characterised by the loss of the dopaminergic neurons in the basal ganglia, leading to the familiar symptoms such as a resting tremor, bradykinesia (slowness of movement) and rigidity. Current therapies, although very effective at treating the symptoms, do not halt the dopaminergic neuron loss. Research at NFB is aimed at using polymeric gene therapy systems to halt the progression of neuron loss through neuroprotective routes.

Multiple sclerosis (MS), a chronic demyelinating disease, is thought to be initiated by pathogenic T cells that transmigrate the vascular endothelium and enter the brain through vascular and parenchymal basement membranes. Although MS is regarded as a white matter disease, the incidence of the demyelination and axonal injury is also prominent in grey matter. Current models used for these studies do not adequately represent the chronic lesions in cortical grey matter found in MS sufferers. NFB is focusing on the development of a chronic model system using a functionalised biomaterials approach.

=== Regenerative strategies for cardiovascular treatments ===
Preclinical studies and preliminary data derived from clinical trials indicate the potential for the use of gene therapy or stem cell therapy for cardiovascular applications. At the NFB, the goal is to take gene or stem cell therapy and combine it with biomaterial delivery systems to enhance efficacy and improve control. The clinical targets are both ischemic muscle injuries, the first in the myocardium itself (myocardial infarction), and the second is in the lower limb (lower limb ischemia). The choice of gene in the case of biomaterial-mediated gene therapy is also a major focus of the NFB, as novel gene therapy modalities such as miRNA and siRNA knock-down of genes are untested options. The ultimate goal of the NFB cardiovascular group is clinically relevant regeneration or repair after ischemic injury using biomaterial-based therapies.

== Industry ==
While NFB's core service centres on academic research and development within the University, much of the work carried out at NFB facilitates the development of collaborations with the medical device, pharmaceuticals and biotechnology industry both nationally and internationally. The main services NFB offers to industry include: development of unique biomaterial platform technologies, adding value to existing platforms, development of custom-made biomaterials, trouble-shooting biomaterial-based issues in medical devices, in vitro/in vivo studies and developing biomaterials for drug delivery. The NFB technology platforms that are currently available for licensing are as follows:

1. Porous titanium construct for orthopaedic applications
2. Collagen based multi-channel neural conduit
3. Extracellular matrix scaffold for wound closure
4. Hollow core nano-spheres in a range of biodegradable materials
5. PEG-based polymeric linkage systems for linking biomolecules and drugs
6. Injectable PEG based hydrogel system
7. Smart/responsive PEG based dendritic/hyperbranched polymers
8. Degradable pH and reducible responsive non-viral transfection vectors
9. High grade PLGA and PCL
10. Cell-sheet technologies
11. Various ECM molecules
