= Stornoway Communications =

Canadian broadcasting and production company

- Company type: Private company
- Industry: Media
- Founded: 2000
- Headquarters: Toronto, Ontario, Canada
- Key people: Kitson Vincent, Owner
- Products: Broadcasting, Television Production
- Owner: Stornoway Investors Group

Stornoway Communications is a privately held Canadian broadcasting and production company based in Toronto, Ontario.

Stornoway owns two production arms called Stornoway Productions and Stornoway Films; Stornoway Productions produces various in-depth documentaries while Stornoway Films produce dramas and other entertainment programs.

== Former broadcasting assets ==
- bpm:tv; a specialty channel devoted to dance music and dance lifestyle. The channel ceased operations on June 1, 2015.
- ichannel; a public, social and current affairs channel. The channel ceased operations on August 15, 2016.
- The Pet Network; a specialty channel devoted to pets. The channel ceased operations on May 2, 2016.
