= Great Canadian Food Show =

Canadian Television Series

The Great Canadian Food Show is a Canadian television series, which has aired on CBC Television, with repeats later seen on Food Network Canada.

Hosted by Carlo Rota, the series travels across Canada to profile the many varieties of Canadian cuisine.
