= Lee Smart (comedian) =

Canadian actor, writer and comedian

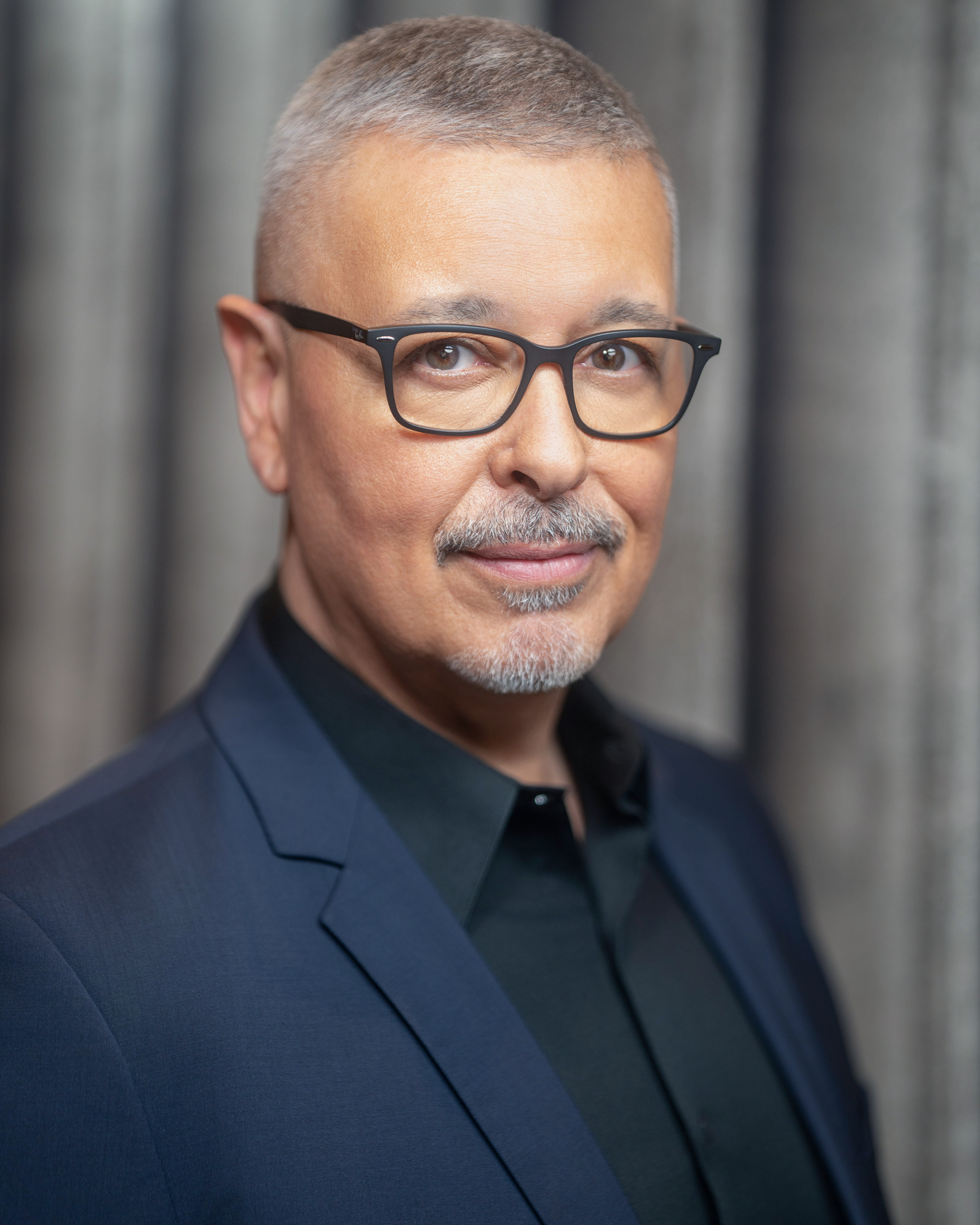
Lee Smart in 2024

Lee Smart is a Canadian actor, writer and comedian currently based in Toronto.

Smart is an alumnus of The Second City Theatre, Toronto's oldest comedy institution, performing there from 1994 to 2001. As part of the mainstage cast, he co-wrote and performed in a number of award-nominated and winning original revues, including "Sordio Deluxo", "Y2K: The Chip Hits The Fan" and "Nude Beach Wear: 100% Off!" Other live productions include has co-written and starred the sci-fi comedic play "Overlords!" and the Lord of the Rings inspired satire "Rings!"

In association with Steve Smith and S&S Productions, Smart also produced, wrote and starred in the critically acclaimed Comedy Network series "The 5th Quadrant" (13 episodes, 2000–2002).

As an actor, Smart has been featured in several TV and radio commercials as well as TV and film roles including "The Prizewinner of Defiance Ohio", "Honey" and "Undercover Brother".

He is also a member of Illusionoid, with Paul Bates and Nug Nahrgang Illusionoid produces a popular improvised comedy science fiction podcast featuring guest stars and appearances by well-known comedy performers, including Colin Mochrie and Sean Cullen.

Smart performed the role of King Cole in An Inconvenient Musical, based on the environmental ideas of Al Gore.

In 2013, Smart is a Creative Director at Second City Communications in Toronto, as well as a partner with his wife Lindsay Leese in Smartleese Creative Inc. a company that provides creative and training services for corporate clients in the Toronto area.
