= Life's Little Miracles =

- Country of origin: Canada
- Original language: English

Production
- Running time: 60 minutes (including commercials)

Original release
- Network: Slice Network/CBC Television
- Release: September 20, 1999 – 2007

Life's Little Miracles (or Little Miracles) follows the stories of children at Toronto's Hospital for Sick Children. It originally aired on Canadian broadcasters Slice Network and CBC Television.

== History ==
The series' first season started airing on September 20, 1999, and had 13 episodes. The 30-minute episodes ran on the Life Network. It was produced by Ron Singer and Peter Williamson and his company Breakthrough Films. Television stations in England, Italy, and the United States purchased the rights to broadcast the show. Around 2001, the series was extended for a third season containing 26 episodes.

The producers spent 2.5 years to work out with the hospital how they could send film crew into it. The show secured families' written authorization to be able to record patients. Several times families have revoked the authorization, leading to the cancellation of that episode. None of the show's participants are paid for their appearances on it. Owing to the emotionally difficult subject matter of observing ill children, the television series hired a psychotherapist to keep an eye on the crew and to give talks about mental pressure.

== Content ==
Set at the Hospital for Sick Children in Toronto, the inaugural episode on September 20, 1999, covered a teenager whose neck had a malignant tumor and a comatose four-year-girl who had been injured in a collision. A 2003 episode covered an eight-year-old girl from the Philippines afflicted with frontal encephalocele. Doctors at the Hospital for Sick Children operated on her face to take out a large growth.

== Reception ==
Andrew Ryan of The Globe and Mail praised the show, saying "the stories on Life's Little Miracles are hopeful though always heartwrenching". The Waterloo Region Record's Bonnie Malleck said the show was "a poignant, heart-warming 13-part series using a cinema verite style to follow the on-going stories of 'little miracles' performed daily at Toronto's Hospital for Sick Children."
