= Laszlo Barna =

Canadian TV producer

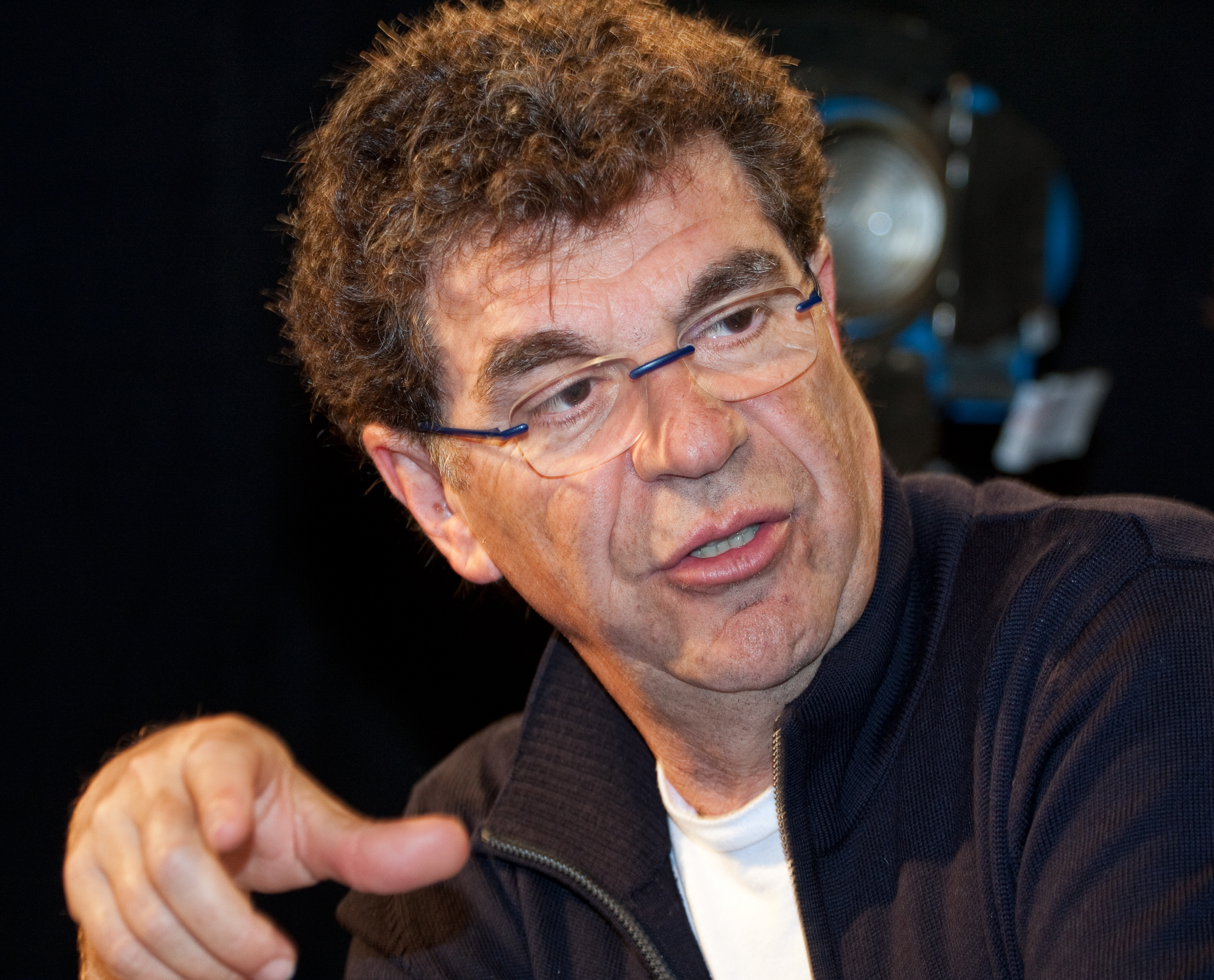
- Canadian television producer
- Born: 1948 (age 77–78); Hungary
- Occupation: Television Producer
- Spouse: Laura Alper

Laszlo Barna (born 1948) is a Gemini Award-winning executive producer of television programs and films. Born in Hungary but living and working in Canada, Barna produced prominent television shows such as Da Vinci's Inquest and Blue Murder.

== Biography ==
Barna was born in Hungary and immigrated to Canada with his family in the late 1950s as a result of the Hungarian Uprising. His parents were Holocaust survivors who had been imprisoned in Auschwitz concentration camp. Barna and his parents arrived in Canada at Pier 21 in Halifax, Nova Scotia. As part of a 2006 portrait photography exhibit in which Barna was featured, he stated that his parents "had suffered under both fascism and communism, and they said they were looking for a country where politicians retire rather than being executed"

Barna experimented with stand-up comedy but suffered from stage fright, leading him to embark on a career as a television producer. He told the Toronto Star in 2002, "I like it behind the camera. It's safe there."

By 2002 Barna's company, a partnership with his wife Laura Alper, was the most prolific producer of English-language TV programs in Canada.

== Awards ==
Barna has won several industry awards, including multiple Gemini awards for Da Vinci's Inquest as "Best Dramatic Series" (in each year 1999-2002 and again in 2004). He also received the Donald Brittain Award in 2007 for the 2006 TV series Fatherland.
