= The Link (TV program) =

American television documentary

- Genre: Documentary
- Starring: Josh Klein
- Country of origin: United States
- Original language: English
- No. of episodes: 5

Production
- Production location: United States
- Running time: 43 minutes

Original release
- Network: National Geographic Channel
- Release: May 25, 2012 – 2012

The Link is an American documentary television program, hosted by Josh Klein, that aired on National Geographic Channel in 2012. The program examines the history and advances leading up to a given modern technology in each episode.

== Overview ==
Each episode presents the technology that is the topic of the day. Then a series of historic events and inventions are outlined during the show, in a narrative by Klein, leading to the production of that technology.

== Episodes ==
- Swords to Spy Planes
- Aqueducts to Oil Rigs
- Fireworks to Forensics
- Ploughs to Supercars
- Waterwheels to Mega Jets
