= Exhibit A: Secrets of Forensic Science =

- Presented by: Graham Greene
- Country of origin: Canada
- Original language: English

Original release
- Network: Discovery Channel Canada
- Release: September 30, 1997 – 2001

Exhibit A: Secrets of Forensic Science is a Canadian television series highlighting the role of forensic science in solving crimes.
