= The Sketchersons =

Canadian sketch comedy troupe

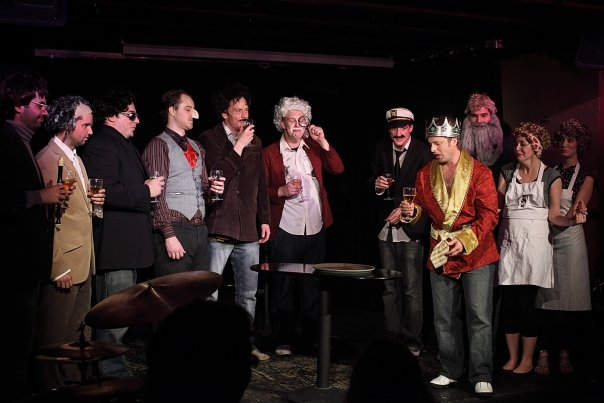
The Sketchersons perform a sketch at Sunday Night Live with host Kayla Lorette, August 16, 2009

The Sketchersons are a sketch comedy troupe based in Toronto, Ontario. They are winners of the 2007 Canadian Comedy Award for best Sketch Troupe, an award they had been nominated for each of the 3 years prior. The Sketchersons were again nominated for the award in 2008, 2009, 2010, and 2013.

The Sketchersons have performed across Canada and the United States, including at the 2005 and 2006 Montreal Fringe Festivals, the 2006 New York Fringe Festival, the 2008 Just For Laughs Sketch Comedy Gala in Toronto, the 2009 Chicago Sketch Comedy Festival, and at the 2012 JFL42 Festival. Members of the troupe are also active in Toronto's comedy scene and can be seen at various shows around the city including Laugh Sabbath, The Last Comedy Show and Projectproject amongst others.

== Current Sketchersons ==
- Matt Nadeau - Joined January 18, 2015
- Gillian Bartolucci - Joined January 18, 2015
- Marshall Lorenzo - Joined March 20, 2016 / Former Head Writer
- Adele Marie Dicks - Joined March 20, 2016
- Colin Sharpe - Joined March 20, 2016 / Current Co-Head Writer
- Samantha Adams - Joined March 20, 2016
- Alex Kolanko - Joined July 9, 2017
- Emily Richardson - Joined July 9, 2017 / Current Co-Head Writer
- Erica Gellert - Joined July 9, 2017
- Tom Hearn - Joined July 9, 2017 / Producer
- Aba Amuquandoh - Joined November 18, 2018
- Ayaka Kinugawa - Joined January 6, 2019
- Ajahnis Charley - Joined March 3, 2019
- Chelsea Larkin - Joined March 3, 2019
- Guy Bradford - Joined March 3, 2019
- Jake Martin - Joined March 3, 2019
- Nicole Passmore - Joined March 3, 2019
- Patrick Murray - Joined March 3, 2019
- Gary Rideout Jr. - Founding Member/ Producer
- Áine Davis - Technical & Lighting Director

=== Sunday Night Live Alumni ===
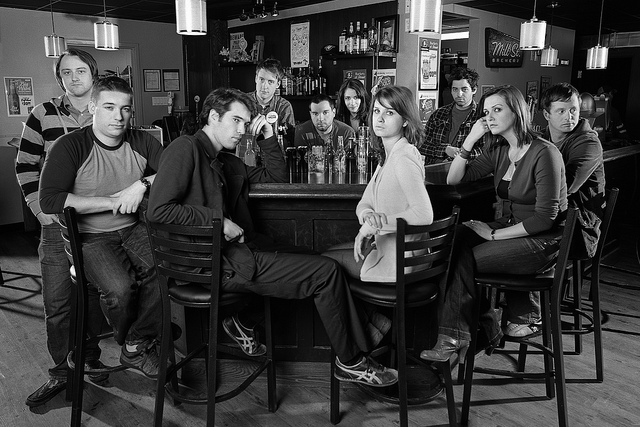
The April 2010 cast of Sunday Night Live (minus Pat Thornton, Cole Osborne and Daryn McIntyre)

- Grant Cumming - Founding member
- Dan Galea - Founding member
- Holly Prazoff - Founding member
- Shannon Beckner - Founding member
- Tal Zimerman - Founding member; former news anchor
- Craig Brown - Founding member
- Bob Kerr - Founding member; former news anchor
- Inessa Frantowski - Founding member
- Pat Thornton - Founding member, former head writer
- Fraser Young
- Gilson Lubin
- Nikki Payne
- Jared Sales - former news anchor
- Josh Saltzman - Joined July 3, 2007
- Cole Osborne - Joined July 3, 2007; former news anchor
- Laura Cilevitz - Joined July 3, 2007
- Norm Sousa - Joined July 3, 2007; former head writer
- Jason DeRosse - Joined July 3, 2007
- Andy Hull - Joined July 3, 2007
- Carly Heffernan - Joined Nov 6th, 2008
- Alex Tindal - Joined Nov 6th, 2008
- Sarah Hillier - Joined Nov 6th, 2008
- Brendan Halloran - Joined Nov 6th, 2008; former news anchor/ head writer
- Kevin Matviw - Joined August 15, 2010
- Kaitlin Loftus - Joined March 7, 2011
- Ian MacIntyre - Joined August 15, 2010
- Kirsten Rasmussen - Joined January 20, 2013
- Jon Blair - Joined Nov 6th, 2008; former head writer
- Phil Moorhead - Joined March 7, 2011
- Daryn McIntyre - Joined Nov 6th, 2008; former head Writer
- Greg Chociej - Joined January 20, 2013
- Alexandra Wylie - Joined March 7, 2011
- Ann Pornel - Joined March 7, 2011
- Mark Andrada - Joined July 18, 2004; former Technical and Lighting Director
- Andy Auld - Joined March 7, 2011 - former Director/Producer
- Jocelyn Geddie - Joined August 15, 2010 - Head Writer/Producer
- Allison Hogg - Joined January 20, 2013 - Head Writer / Producer
- Jeremy Woodcock - Joined January 20, 2013 - News Anchor
- Joel Buxton - Joined March 7, 2011
- Brandon Hackett - Joined January 20, 2013
- Jonathan Langdon - Joined January 20, 2013
- Greg Cochrane - Joined January 18, 2015
- Carson Pinch - Joined January 18, 2015
- Allana Reoch - Joined January 18, 2015
- Tricia Black - Joined January 18, 2015
- Lisa Gilroy - Joined March 20, 2016
- Georgia Brown - Technical & Lighting Director
- Alessandra Vite - Joined January 20, 2013/ Headwriter
- Alanna McConnell - Technical & Lighting Director
- Isabel Kanaan - Joined July 9, 2017
- Natalie Metcalfe - Joined July 9, 2017
- Matt Folliott- Joined March 20, 2016
- Celeste Yim - Joined July 9, 2017
- Tim Blair - Joined July 9, 2017
- Kyah Green - Joined March 3, 2019

== Sunday Night Live ==
Sunday Night Live
- Written by: The Sketchersons
- Genre: Sketch Comedy

Premiere
- Date: January 4, 2004
- Place: Toronto

The Sketchersons run the weekly stage show Sunday Night Live, which is modeled after Saturday Night Live which airs on NBC. Sunday Night Live began in Toronto in early 2004 at The Rivoli on Queen Street West, but only lasted for 2 shows before moving to the Poor Alex Theatre on Brunswick Street at Bloor, with hosts such as Amanda Walsh, Scott Thompson, and Snow. In 2005, The Poor Alex closed, and the show moved across the street to The Brunswick House, a popular bar for university students. Notable hosts from this stint at "The Brunny" include Colin Mochrie, WWE wrestler Chris Jericho and Royal Canadian Air Farce's Don Ferguson. From January to December 2007, the group had a successful run at the Diesel Playhouse. Hosts from that year included Toronto Mayor David Miller, Canadian Idol Ryan Malcolm, Tyler Stewart and Kevin Hearn (members of The Barenaked Ladies) and former Toronto Argonaut John Avery.

In January 2008, Sunday Night Live went on hiatus as the show's new, permanent venue was under renovation. In November 2008, Comedy Bar opened its doors as the Sketcherson's permanent home, and the cast (which expanded, adding 6 new members) has been writing a new show every week since. Hosts from this era have included famed stand-up comedian Andy Kindler, Kids in the Hall's Kevin McDonald, Greg Proops, wrestler Bret "The Hitman" Hart, Actors Tatiana Maslany, Amy Matysio and Kevin Sorbo, Saturday Night Live alumni Jerry Minor and Jeff Richards, Eastbound & Down's Steve Little, The Sports Network anchor Jay Onrait, Second City alum Sandy Jobin-Bevans, stand-up comedians Todd Glass, Todd Barry, Kurt Braunohler, and Video On Trial mainstay Debra DiGiovanni.

Sunday Night Live Hosts

=== 2004 ===
Show Number	Date	Host[s]	Notes
1	January 4	Albert Howell	The debut of Sunday Night Live occurs at The Rivoli.
2	January 11	Jason Rouse	2nd and last show at the Rivoli.
3	January 18	Gavin Stephens	Sunday Night Live moves to its new home, The Poor Alex Theatre.
4	January 22	Levi MacDougall	
5	February 1	Paul Bellini	
6	February 8	Jason Rouse	
7	February 15	Laurie Elliott	
8	February 22	Gilson Lubin	Gilson Lubin would later become the first host of Sunday Night Live to join the Sketchersons
9	February 29	Tim Polley	
11	March 15	Alan Park	
12	March 21	Paul Schuck	
13	March 29	Terry McGurrin	
14	April 4	Boyd Banks	
15	April 18	Mark Forward	
16	April 25	Nicole Stamp	
17	May 2	Mike Strobel	
18	May 9	Jo-Anna Downey	
19	May 16	Andy Boorman	
20	May 23	Nikki Payne	
21	May 30	The Imponderables	The Imponderables are the first sketch troupe to host Sunday Night Live. They are composed of Dave Brennan, Eric Toth, Jon Smith and Tony Lombardo.
22	June 6	Amanda Walsh	
23	June 13	Ryan Belleville	
24	June 20	Aurora Browne	
25	June 27	Don Ferguson	Don Ferguson was the first member of legendary sketch troupe The Royal Canadian Air Farce to host.
26	July 4	Snow	
27	July 11	Scott Thompson	
28	July 18	Sabotage	
29	July 25	Seán Cullen	
30	August 1	Marc Hickox	
31	August 8	Fraser Young	
32	August 15	Richard Crouse	
33	August 22	Chris McCawley	
34	August 29	Jen Goodhue	
35	September 5	Ron Sparks	
36	September 12	Kate Davis	
37	September 19	Winston Spear	
38	September 25	Bruce Hunter	
39	October 3	Terry Clement	
40	October 17	Jon Dore	
41	October 24	Mark Forward	
42	October 31	Terry McGurrin as George W. Bush	Comedian Terry McGurrin was the first of only two hosts to perform entirely in character - the other being Marc Hickox as Heino.
43	November 7	Angelo Tsarouchas	
44	November 14	Karina Huber	
45	November 21	Kristeen Von Hagen	
46	November 28	Paul Bates	
47	December 5	Sandy Jobin-Bevans	
48	December 12	The Minnesota Wrecking Crew	Just the second sketch troupe to host Sunday Night Live, The Minnesota Wrecking Crew are John Catucci, Josh Glover, Mike 'Nug' Nahrgang and Ron Sparks.
49	December 19	Elvira Kurt	

=== 2005 ===
Show Number	Date	Host[s]	Notes
50	January 9	No Host (Best of 2004)	
51	January 16	No Host (One Year Anniversary Show)	
52	January 23	Trevor Boris	
53	January 30	Melanie Martin	
54	February 6	Ron Josol	
55	February 13	Boyd Banks	
56	February 20	Paul Bellini	
57	March 6	The Imponderables	
58	March 13	Martha Chaves	
59	March 20	Steve Patterson	
60	April 3	Knock, Knock, Who's There? Comedy!	Katie Crown, Aaron Eves, Adam Brodie and Dave Derewlany become just the 3rd sketch group to host Sunday Night Live.
61	April 10	Eliza Jane Scott and Sarah Cornell	
62	April 17	Andy Boorman	
63	April 24	Dave Martin	
64	May 1	Paul Constable	
65	May 8	Jo-Anna Downey	
66	May 15	Frank Spadone	
67	May 22	Scott Thompson	
68	May 29	Alan Park	
69	June 5	The Gurg (Fringe Fundraiser)	
70	June 12	No Host (Montreal Fringe)	
71	June 19	No Host (Montreal Fringe)	
72	June 26	Gavin Crawford	
73	July 3	TJ Dawe	
74	July 10	Seán Cullen	
75	July 17	Colin Mochrie	
76	July 24	Craig Lauzon	
77	July 31	Mark Andrada	
78	August 7	Josie Dye	
79	August 14	Enza Supermodel	
80	August 21	Joe Dinicol	
81	August 28	The Gurg	
82	September 4	No Host (End of Summer Bash)	"Featuring Ron Sparks, Fraser Young, Boyd Banks, Jen Goodhue, Jon Dore, Paul Bellini and more"
83	September 11	Jenn Robertson	
84	September 18	Trevor Boris	
85	September 25	Marc Hickox as Heino	
86	October 2	Brian Froud	
87	October 16	Winston Spear	
88	October 23	Jon Steinberg	
89	October 30	Terry Clement	
90	November 6	Sass and the City	Jan Caruana, Lauren Ash, Rica Eckersley, and Sarah Buski
91	November 13	Fraser Young	
92	November 20	Alex Nussbaum	
93	November 27	A Chair	
94	December 4	Debra DiGiovanni	
95	December 11	Lucy DeCoutere	
96	December 18	Multiple Hosts including Boyd Banks and Ron Sparks (Christmas Show)	

=== 2006 ===
Show Number	Date	Host[s]	Notes
97	January 8	Ron Josol	
98	January 15	Terry McGurrin	
99	January 22	Jeff McEnery	
100	January 29	No Host (Best of 2005)	
101	February 5	The Understudies	Robert Knox, Paul Levia and Justin Skinner
102	February 12	John Avery	
103	February 19	Laurie Elliott	
104	February 26	Nick Flanagan	
105	March 5	Kyle Radke	
106	March 12	Morgan Waters	
107	March 19	Pay Chen	
108	March 26	Henri Faberge and the Adorables	
109	April 2	Christian Potenza	
110	April 9	Colin Mochrie, Lucy DeCoutere, John Avery, Sean Cullen, Don Ferguson, and Jon Dore	The Sketchersons celebrated their "100th" show at The Winter Garden theatre with multiple hosts.
111	April 23	Morbio	Court Jarrel, Andrew McGillvray, Steve Murphy, and Mike Sullivan
112	April 30	Kurt Smeaton	
113	May 7	Pat Kelly and Peter Oldring	
114	May 14	NO HOST (The Worst-Of Show)	
115	May 21	Long Weekend Spectacular	
116	May 28	10,000 To Flight	Julie Dumais and Mark Andrada
117	June 4	NO HOST (Montreal Fringe Preview)	
118	June 11	NO HOST (Montreal Fringe)	
119	June 18	NO HOST (Montreal Fringe)	
120	June 25	NO HOST (We're Back Show)	
121	July 2	Andy Boorman	
122	July 9	Don Ferguson and Kevin Heard	
123	July 16	Chris Jericho	
124	July 23	Uncalled For Improv	Anders Yates, Caitlin Howden, Dan Jeannotte, Jacynthe Lalonde, Matt Goldberg, and Mike Hughes
125	July 30	Lisa Brooke	
126	August 6	Jennifer Hollett	
127	August 13	NO HOST (New York Fringe Preview)	
128	August 20	NO HOST (New York Fringe)	
129	August 27	NO HOST (New York Fringe)	
130	September 3	NO HOST (Radio Show vol. 1)	
131	September 10	Matt Baram	
132	September 17	Canker (Jared Sales and Daryn McIntyre)	
133	September 24	NO HOST (Radio Show vol. 2)	
134	October 1	Brandon Firla	
135	October 15	Marc Hickox	
136	October 22	Winston Spear	
137	October 29	Ben Miner and Jon Steinberg	
138	November 5	Aaron Merke	First appearance of the newly expanded Sketchersons cast including Norm Sousa, Andy Hull, Jason Derosse, Greg Calderone, Matt Karzis, Jen Martinovic and Charity Adams.
139	November 12	J.R. Digs	
140	November 19	John Avery	
141	November 26	Richard Ryder	
142	December 3	The Bicycles	
143	December 10	Alex Nussbaum	
144	December 17	Multiple Hosts (Andy Boorman, Alex Nussbaum and Ron Sparks) (Year End Special)	

=== 2007 ===
Show Number	Date	Host[s]	Notes
145	January 21	NO HOST (Best of 2006)	Sunday Night Live moves from The Brunswick House to The Diesel Playhouse
146	January 28	Tyler Stewart and Kevin Hearn	
147	February 4	Morgan Waters	
148	February 11	Ryan Malcolm	
149	February 18	Teresa Pavlinek	
150	March 4	Debra McGrath	
151	March 11	John Avery	
152	March 18	Shauna MacDonald and James Roussel	
153	March 25	Paul Constable	
154	April 1	Nathan Fielder	
155	April 15	David Miller (3 Year Anniversary)	Toronto Mayor, David Miller hosted the 3 year anniversary of Sunday Night Live at the Diesel Playhouse.
156	April 22	Aurora Browne	
157	April 29	Boyd Banks	
158	May 6	Chris Gibbs	
159	May 13	Gavin Crawford	
160	May 20	NO HOST (Volcanic Wind)	
161	May 27	Barry Taylor	
162	June 3	NO HOST (L.A. Showcase)	
163	June 24	NO HOST (Fringe Preview)	
164	July 1	The Doo-Wops	
165	July 8	Alan Park and Penelope Corrin	
166	July 15	Christian Potenza	
167	July 22	10,000 To Flight	
168	July 29	NO HOST (Cancerball Run)	
169	August 5	Casey Corbin	
170	August 12	Sabrina Jalees	
171	August 19	Sandra Battaglini	
172	August 26	Anand Rajaram	
173	September 2	Rebecca Addelman	
174	September 9	Ron Sparks	
175	September 16	Nicole Arbour	
176	September 23	Darren Frost	
177	September 30	Trevor Boris	
178	October 14	Nikki Payne	
179	October 21	Vivieno Caldinelli	
180	October 28	Sean Gehon	
181	November 4	Christine Diakos	
182	November 11	Sara Hennessey	
183	November 18	Ryan Malcolm	
184	November 25	Johnny Gardhouse	
185	December 2	Peter Anthony	
186	December 9	NO HOST ("Worst Of" vol. 2)	

=== 2008 ===
Sunday Night Live went on a 10-month hiatus and returned once renovations to Comedy Bar were complete.

Musical Guest list was not archived before 2008

Show Number	Date	Host[s]	Musical Guest	Notes
187	November 9	Sandy Jobin-Bevans	Sean Pinchin	Sunday Night Live debuts at the fully renovated and officially opened Comedy Bar
188	November 16	Katie Crown	Maylee Todd	
189	November 23	Pat Kelly	Laura Fernandez	
190	November 30	Chris Gibbs	The Human Statues	
191	December 7	Nathan MacIntosh	MJ Cyr	
192	December 14	Kathleen Phillips	Kirt Godwin	
193	December 21	Sara Hennessey, Casey Corbin, Peter Anthony, Boyd Banks	Drew Smith	Christmas special, monologue performed by Sara Hennessey
194	December 28	Debra DiGiovanni	None	Scheduled musical guest, comedian Donnie Hornet, was killed in a streetcar accident weeks prior to his appearance, prompting the first public performance of the song, "Spring Jacket".

=== 2009 ===
Show Number	Date	Host[s]	Musical Guest	Notes
195	January 4	David Kerr	Anna Sudac	
196	January 11	Danny Smith	Danny Smith	
197	January 18	NO HOST (Best of 2008)	None	
198	January 25	Ron Pederson	Tyler Yarema	
199	February 1	NO HOST (Post Super Bowl Show)	None	
200	February 8	Graham Wagner	Kjartan and the Solid Gold Internets	
201	February 15	Andrew Johnston	Wordburglar	
202	March 1	Allyson Smith	Ola Roks	
203	March 8	Tim Gilbert	Thelonious Infamous Bajcar	
204	March 15	Ian Sirota	The Courtney Wells Band	
205	March 22	Jay Onrait	Sean Pinchin	
206	March 29	Jonny Harris	PDF Format	
207	April 5	Jim Annan	Peter Van Helvoort	
208	April 19	Rebecca Kohler	The Wilderness of Manitoba	
209	April 26	Ghost Jail	Megan Hamilton	
210	May 3	Dini Dimakos	Robyn Dell’Unto	
211	May 10	Eric Toth	David Ward	
212	May 17	Kurt Smeaton	Provincial Parks	
213	May 24	Andy Kindler	Donovan Woods	
214	May 31	Scott Montgomery	The Good Sweaters	
215	June 7	NO HOST (Best of Jan-May 2009)	Wordburglar and Peter Project	
216	June 14	Boyd Banks	Wax Mannequin	
217	June 21	Levi MacDougall	The DoneFors	
218	June 28	Tatiana Maslany	Melon Miles	
219	July 5	Emily Candini	Melissa Bathory	
220	July 12	Uncalled For Improv	Drew Smith and Niall Fynes	Anders Yates, Caitlin Howden, Dan Jeannotte, Jacynthe Lalonde, Matt Goldberg, and Mike Hughes
221	July 19	Jerry Minor	Jerry Minor	On July 19, 2009, Jerry Minor became the first ex-cast member of Saturday Night Live to host Sunday Night Live
222	July 26	Fraz Wiest	The Paint Movement	
223	August 2	Gavin Crawford	The Good Sweaters	
224	August 9	Mark Little	Gravity Wave	
225	August 16	Kayla Lorette	Manelli Jamal	
226	August 23	Andre Arruda	Songs of the Sea	
227 & 228	August 30	NO HOST (2 Industry Best Of shows)	Robyn Dell’Unto and Sean Pinchin	
229	September 6	Jan Caruana	The DoneFors	
230	September 13	Sweatshop Hop	The Wilderness of Manitoba	
231	September 20	Sean Tabares	Mandippal Jandu	
232	September 27	Peter Stevens	Eve and the Ocean	
233	October 4	NO HOST (Sketchersons TV Special)	The Hots	
234	October 18	Fraser Young	The Paint Movement	
235	October 25	Brandon Firla	Dave Borins	
236	November 1	Colin Mochrie	Sean Pinchin	
237	November 8	Dini Dimakos Andrew Johnston; Jonny Harris; Sean Tabares; Tatiana Maslany; David Kerr; Fraser Young; Eric Toth	Make Your Exit	Originally scheduled host Tim Meadows was forced to back out due to scheduling conflicts, resulting in the first Sunday Night Live Best of Hosts show.
238	November 15	Ben Mulroney	Members of Hooded Fang	2009 Toronto Sketch Comedy Festival
239	November 22	Todd Barry	Whale Tooth	
240	November 29	Adam Christie	The DoneFors	
241	December 6	Paul Bates	Jay McCarrol	
242	December 13	Laurie Elliot	Entire Cities	
243	December 20	Ingrid Haas	Ben Kunder	
244	December 27	NO HOST	Wilderness of Manitoba	Radio Show

=== 2010 ===
Show Number	Date	Host[s]	Musical Guest	Notes
245	January 3	NO HOST	Maylee Todd & Will Witwham	Part of Comedy Bar's New Formats Week, the cast was split in half with Pat Thornton, Gary Rideout Jr, Carly Heffernan, Andy Hull, Jon Blair and Brendan Halloran representing "Team Burn" and Cole Osborne, Norm Sousa, Sarah Hillier, Jason Derosse, Daryn McIntyre and Alex Tindal representing "Team Dud". The two groups performed the same set of sketches each as separate troupes. Musical guests Maylee Todd and Will Witwham each did their own interpretations of Elton John's Tiny Dancer.
246	January 10	Bobby Mair & Dylan Gott	The Donefors	
247	January 17	NO HOST	Make Your Exit	Best of 2009
248	January 24	Adam Growe	Kevin Myles Wilson	
249	January 31	Kris Siddiqi	Mikey and the Muskrats	
250	February 14	Brian Barlow & Deborah Robinson-Barlow	Bronwyn West & Melon Miles	Couples themed show for Valentine's Day
251	February 21	David Reale	Kat Burns	
252	February 28	Pete Zedlacher	Hamilton Trading Co.	
253	March 14	No Host	Multiple Musical Guests	The First Sunday Night Live Best of Musical Guests. Acts included Robyn Dell'Unto, Provincial Parks, Make Your Exit, Hooded Fang and Whale Tooth.
254	March 21	Emmanuel Belliveau	Paul Kolinski	
255	March 28	Bruce Horak	Henri Fabrege	
256	April 4	Sara Hennessey	People of Canada	TSN Anchor Jay Onrait appeared on the SNN Headline News segment.
257	April 11	Becky Johnson	Shawn Clarke	
258	April 18	James Cybulski	The Spooky Scarecrows	James Cybulski becomes the second TSN anchor to host Sunday Night Live.
259	April 25	John Catucci	Michelle Willis & Heather Crawford	
260	May 2	Anand Rajaram	Joel Pryor	
261	May 9	Darrin Rose	Members of Proxy Set	
262	May 16	Alan Frew	Alan Frew	
263	May 23	Jet Eveleth & Paul Brittain	Mike Celia	Jet Eveleth and Paul Brittain (from Chicago, IL) host as part of the 2010 Projectproject Combustion Festival
264	June 6	Mike "Nug" Nahrgang	Ashley Beattie	
265	June 13	Frenzy	Wordburglar	
266	June 20	No Host	Joel Martin	Each of the cast members picked their favourite sketches of all time, from any era of the Sketchersons existence.
267	June 27	Lauren Ash	Brad Casey	
268	July 4	Kirsten Rasmussen & Dan Jeannotte	MJ Cyr	
269	July 11	Shelley-Ann Brown	Ashley Beattie	
270	July 18	Soundspeed	Soundspeed	
271	August 1	No Host	Mikey Muscat	Much like the New Formats Week show, the cast was divided into two teams, this time along gender lines and were given the same sketches to perform. Team T's was made up of Inessa Frantowski, Sarah Hillier, Carly Heffernan and Laura Cilevitz. TEAM D's was made up of Alex Tindal, Gary Rideout Jr., Andy Hull, Brendan Halloran and Daryn McIntyre.
272	August 15	Dan O'Toole	Emily Mover	Sunday Night Live debuts the 3 newest Sketchersons: Jocelyn Geddie, Ian MacIntyre and Kevin Matviw. Dan O'Toole is added to the growing list of TSN Anchors to host Sunday Night Live. The list already contains Jay Onrait (who made a special surprise appearance onstage at the Dan O'Toole show) and James Cybulski.
273	August 22	Graham Chittenden	Carly and Mark	
274	August 29	Craig Brown	Sean Pinchin	Craig Brown becomes the first founding member of the Sketchersons to host Sunday Night Live
275	September 5	Lindsay Ames	Paul Kolinski	
276	September 12	Rob Norman	Ben Somer	
277	September 19	Dan Galea	Sarah Loucks	
278	September 26	Haircut (Allie Price and Patrick Smith)	Shawn Clarke	
279	October 5	Amanda Walsh	Matt York	
280	October 17	Kevin McDonald	Ron Sexsmith	Canadian Comedy Awards, special appearance by former Sports Central anchor Sean McCormick.
281	October 24	Leslie Seiler	Kjartan's Fjords (Kjartan Hewitt)	
282	October 31	Tal Zimerman	The Jean Shallots	Billed as "Sunday Night Dead"
283	November 7	No Host	No Music	Toronto Sketchfest Edition - "Best of" show.
284	November 14	Steve Cochrane	Sarah Dell	
285	November 21	Rob Baker	Jay McCarrol of the Golden Dogs	
286	November 28	Matt Folliott	Joel Battle	
287	December 5	Mark DeBonis	Mike Celia	
288	December 12	NO HOST	Carlie Howell and the DeHarms	Rogers Cable films the December 12th Sunday Night Live for their New Year's Eve countdown show Live to Tape
289	December 19	Alastair Forbes	Three Seasons and the Move	
290	December 26	NO HOST		

=== 2011 ===
Show Number	Date	Host[s]	Musical Guest	Notes
291	January 2	NO HOST	NO MUSIC	As part of the 2nd Festival of New Formats, all the sketches during Sunday Night Live revolve around a single event and share a common theme.
292	January 9	Dan Beirne	Donovan Woods	
293	January 16	NO HOST	Kai	Best of 2010
294	January 23	Mike Kiss	HotKid	
295	January 30	Renee Paquette	The Wilderness of Manitoba	
296	February 13	Sean Tabares and Meg Mack	Jordan Leech	
297	February 20	Andrew Johnston	The Cheeto Girls	
298	March 6	Kayla Lorette	The Emerson Rhythm Band	Sunday Night Live debuts 6 new cast members: Andy Auld, Joel Buxton, Kaitlin Loftus, Phil Moorhead, Ann Pornel, and Alexandra Wylie.
299	March 13	K. Trevor Wilson	Dave Borins	
300	March 20	Kerry Griffin	Thelonious Infamous Bajcar	
301	March 27	Dan Redican	Joel Battle	
302	April 3	Todd Glass	Make Your Exit	
303	April 10	Christian Potenza	Amanda Leblanc	
304	April 17	James Hartnett	Let's Build Machines	
305	April 24	Conor Holler	Gabe Kastner	
306	May 8	NO HOST	Ely Henry	
307	May 15	Standards & Practices	Tia Brazda & the Madmen	
308	May 22	British Teeth	Teenage Kicks	
309	May 29	Ashley Comeau	Alright Alright	
310	June 5	Jason DeRosse	Ben Kunder	
311	June 12	NO HOST	NO MUSIC	Best of Show
312	June 19	Kris Siddiqi	The DoneFors	
313	June 26	James Gangl	Tara Lightfoot	
314	July 3	Dale Boyer	Rick & Chuck	
315	July 10	Chris Craddock	Patrick Grant	
316	July 17	Daniel Woodrow	Young Doctors In Love	
317	July 24	Dave Merheje	The Elwins	
318	July 31	David Dineen-Porter	Gt. Dane	
319	August 7	Mark Andrada	Donovan Woods	
320	August 14	Craig Lauzon	Sean Pinchin	
321	August 21	Adam Cawley	Erin Hunt	
322	August 27	Kevin Sorbo	NO MUSIC	Kevin Sorbo appears as part of the "Kevin Sorbo Garbage Weekend", an event spinning out of a bizarre series of jokes from last November's Pat Thornton 24-Hour Charity Show.
323	August 28	Bob Kerr	NO MUSIC	
324	September 4	Julia Hladkowicz	The Power of Equality	
325	September 11	Pat Thornton	PT Barnums	A farewell show for Sketchersons founding member and former head writer Pat Thornton.
326	September 18	D.J. Demers	BingeNinja	
327	September 25	Evany Rosen	The DoneFors	
328	October 2	Brigitte Kingsley	Sara Wilkinson	
329	October 16	Bret "The Hitman" Hart	HotKid	A special Canadian Comedy Awards edition featuring WWE legend Bret "The Hitman" Hart. Sketchersons CCA nominees include Jon Blair (Best Web Clip), Sarah Hillier (Best Female Improvisor - WINNER), Gary Rideout Jr. (Best One Man Show), and Ian MacIntyre (Best Comedic Play).
330	October 23	Ladystache	1977	
331	October 31	Desiree Lavoy-Dorsch	The Elwins	
332	November 6	Sara Hennessey	Dr. Ew	
333	November 13	Peter Hill, Julianne Snepsts, Gwynne Phillips, Briana Templeton, Jonathan Langdon, Peter Carlone, Morgan George, Laura Danowski, Roger Bainbridge, Brian Macquarrie, Lindy Zucker	Wordburglar and Ashley Beattie	An extra-special Toronto Sketch Comedy Festival Edition, with 11 hosts joining the Sketchersons from the festival's Production Staff and several troupes (Tony Ho, Templeton Philharmonic, Approximately 3 Peters, Vest of Friends, Cheap Smokes, Reverse Oreo, Peter n' Chris, Picnicface, and Queer Comedy Collective). Jay Onrait also stops by to co-host the newsdesk.
334	November 20	Marco Bernardi	Joel Battle	
335	November 27	Greg Proops	Shawn Clarke	Greg Proops hosts Sunday Night Live, capping off Comedy Bar's 3rd Anniversary Weekend.
336	December 4	Ron Sparks	Alright Alright	Ron Sparks hosts for the 6th time, setting the record for most times hosting Sunday Night Live.
337	December 11	the Rivas brothers (Freddie, Thomas, and Miguel Rivas)	Nick Rose	
338	December 18	Best of 2011 Hosts (Dan Beirne, D.J. Demers, Matt Folliott, Alastair Forbes, James Gangl, Andrew Johnston, Kayla Lorette, Evany Rosen)	members of Rouge	

=== 2012 ===
Show Number	Date	Host[s]	Musical Guest	Notes
339	January 8	NO HOST	the Scott and Sarah Experience	As part of Comedy Bar's "Festival Of New Formats", each sketch contains 3 possible endings, with the audience keeping track of which endings they liked the most. At the end of the show the results of audience preferences are tabulated according to "Teen Quizfest" Magazine.
340	January 15	NO HOST	NO MUSIC	Best of 2011 Show
341	January 22	Andy Kindler	Will Whitwham	
342	January 29	Mike Fly	Ely Henry	
343	February 12	Todd Van Allen	Martha Meredith	
344	February 19	Andrew Johnston	The Cheeto Girls	
345	March 4	Paloma Nunez	Nicole Byblow	
346	March 11	Norm Sousa	Daryn McIntyre	
347	March 18	Garrett Jamieson	Steve Cruickshank	
348	March 25	Derek Flores	Patrick Grant	
349	April 1	John Hastings	Sweetsapp	
350	April 8	Hannah Hogan	Erik Schramek	
351	April 15	DJ Demers	jeffrichardsand	
352	April 22	Jason Agnew	David Felton	
353	April 29	Helder Brum	Joel Battle	
354	May 6	Sean Tabares	Kate Ashley	
355	May 13	Bronx Cheer (Conner Holler and Craig Anderson)	Ely Henry	
356	May 20	Teddy Wilson & Ajay Fry	Power of Equality	
357	May 27	Jim Annan	Joel Battle	
358	June 3	Stacey McGunnigle	Donovan Woods	
359	June 10	Bret "The Hitman" Hart	Crimes In Paris	
360	June 17	NO HOST	NO MUSIC	Industry Showcase "Best Of" show
361	June 24	Eric Andrews	Daryn McIntyre	
362	July 1	The Wilderness of Manitoba	The Wilderness of Manitoba	
363	July 8	Steve Patrick Adams	Autobodies	
364	July 15	Simon Pond	The Gerussi Sisters	
365	July 22	Matt Folliott	TBA	
366	July 29	Sandra Battaglini	Language Arts	
367	August 5	Jonathan Langdon	Helsinki	
368	August 12	Ely Henry	Sara Wilkinson	
369	August 19	Monty Scott	Let's Build Machines	
370	September 2	NO HOST	Bradleyboy MacArthur	End of Summer Best-Of Blowout
371	September 9	Bob Kerr	Patrick Grant	
372	September 16	Wayne Jones	Hair Hair	
373	September 23	NO HOST	cast of Avenue Q	Sunday Night Live appears as part of Just For Laughs' "JFL42" festival.
374	September 30	Jamie O'Connor	Maneli Jamal	
375	October 14	Jerry Minor and Steve Little	Jeff Richards	Jerry Minor and Steve Little appear as part of the Big City Improv Festival.
376	October 21	Aaron Berg	Brody Dakin	
377	October 28	K. Trevor Wilson	Donovan Woods	
378	November 4	McGee Maddox	Suzy Wilde	
379	November 11	Pat Thornton	Wordburglar	
380	November 18	Melissa McIntyre	Melissa McIntyre	
381	November 25	NO HOST	NO MUSIC	Reflections 2012: best-of edition.
382	December 9	Ali Hassan	Shawn Clarke	
383	December 16	Nick Flanagan	The Brunswick Project	
384	December 23	Best of 2012 Hosts (Sean Tabares, DJ Demers, Steve Patrick Adams, Paloma Nunez, John Hastings, Ely Henry, Jaime O'Connor, Helder Brum)	MUSIC	

=== 2013 ===
Show Number	Date	Host[s]	Musical Guest	Notes
385	January 6	NO HOST	Sara Wilkinson	As part of Comedy Bar's "Festival Of New Formats", each sketch is based on a premise pitched to the person who wrote it, generally by a family member, friend, or random person.
386	January 13	Carly Heffernan and Alastair Forbes	Justine Demarillac	
387	January 20	John Hastings	Language Arts	Sunday Night Live debuts the 7 newest Sketchersons: Brandon Hackett, Jonathan Langdon, Kirsten Rasmussen, Allison Hogg, Jeremy Woodcock, Greg Chociej, and Alessandra Vite.
388	January 27	James Hartnett	Blue Son	
389	February 3	Deborah Robinson and Brian Barlow	Patrick Grant	
390	February 10	Cast of Hogtown Empire (Dan Beirne, Peter Stevens, Mark Little, and Kayla Lorrette)	Ohio	
391	February 17	Andrew Johnston	Ashley Beattie	
392	March 3	Brendan Halloran	Donovan Woods	
393	March 10	Kurt Braunohler	Shawn Clarke	Sunday Night Live appears as part of the 8th Toronto Sketch Comedy Festival.
394	March 17	Gavin Crawford	Graeme Gerussi	Sunday Night Live appears as part of the 8th Toronto Sketch Comedy Festival.
395	March 24	Hannah Spear	Sara Wilkinson	
396	April 7	Mark Little & Kyle Dooley	Joel Battle	
397	April 14	Templeton Philharmonic (Briana Templeton, Gwynne Phillips)	Falling Androids	
398	April 21	Ben Miner	Brunswick Project	
399	April 28	Matt O'Brien	Menalon	
400	May 5	Kevin McDonald	TCQ	Sunday Night Live's 400th show.
401	May 12	Daniel James	Blimp Rock	
402	May 19	Amy Matysio	Joe Chammas	
403	May 26	Kathleen Phillips	Sarah Shafey	
404	June 2	Adam Christie	That Boy Richie	
405	June 9	Dan Galea	Three Seasons and the Move	
406	June 16	Dr. Ew, Falling Androids, Language Arts, and Wordburglar	Dr. Ew, Falling Androids, Language Arts, and Wordburglar	As part of the NXNE Festival, the show featured 4 musical guests who also hosted and appeared in one sketch each—the show ended in an all-cast and all-hosts rendition of "The Weight" by The Band.
407	June 23	NO HOST - Sketchersons Alumni Show (brief monologue performed by Fraser Young)	Sean Pinchin	Special Sketchersons alumni show featuring past members Laura Cilevitz, Jason DeRosse, Inessa Frantowski, Dan Galea, Brendan Halloran, Sarah Hillier, Andy Hull, Bob Kerr, Holly Prazoff, Gary Rideout, Jr., Pat Thornton, Fraser Young, and Tal Zimerman.
408	June 30	Holly Prazoff	Mirian Kay	
409	July 7	Jess Beaulieu & Laura Bailey	Erin Hunt	
410	July 14	Peter & Chris	Marty Topps	
411	July 21	Amanda Brooke Perrin	Patti Cake	
412	July 28	Tony Ho (Roger Bainbridge, Adam Niebergall, and Miguel Rivas)	Patrick Grant	
413	August 4	Ken Hall	Brunswick Project	
414	August 11	Freddie Rivas	Molly Flood	
415	August 18	Inessa Frantowski	Sean Pinchin	
416	August 25	The Conventioneers (Matt Chin & Jason Agnew)	Bleach Blonde Butthole	
417	September 1	Tyler Morrison	Sara Wilkinson	
418	September 8	Cheap Smokes	Kevin Myles Wilson Duo	
419	September 15	Tess Degenstein	Pamela Martin	
420	September 29	Laurie Elliott	Suzannah Wilde	
421	October 20	Jeff Richards	Ely Henry	Saturday Night Live and MadTV alumnus Jeff Richards appeared as a part of the Big City Improv Festival.
422	October 27	Bryan O'Gorman	Allan Rayman	
423	November 3	Sarah Hillier	Chossi	
424	November 10	Jon Blair	Patrick Grant	Former head writer Jon Blair's farewell show.
423	November 17	Rhiannon Archer	David Felton and the Silent Pilots	
424	November 24	Christophe Davidson	ManChyna	The show's first ever live onstage marriage proposal by an audience member.
425	December 1	Roger Bainbridge	Brunswick Project	The show's second ever live onstage marriage proposal by an audience member.
426	December 8	Simon Fraser	Hair Hair	
427	December 15	Daniel James, Andrew Johnston, Kaitlin Loftus, Amy Matysio, Matt O'Brien, Amanda Brooke Perrin, Hannah Spear, and sketch troupe Tony Ho	Marty Topps	"Best of Hosts" 2013

=== 2014 ===
Show Number	Date	Host[s]	Musical Guest	Notes
428	January 5	NO HOST	Language Arts & The Wilderness of Manitoba	Final night of The Sketchersons' 10-Year Anniversary Festival
429	January 12	James Adomian		Season 11 Premiere
430	January 19	John Hastings		
431	January 26	Chris Locke		
432	February 2	"Terrific Women" (a.k.a. Sara Hennessey & Steph Kaliner)		
433	February 9	Nigel Grinstead		
434	February 16	Christina Walkinshaw		
435	February 23	Pete Zedlacher		
436	March 9	The Sketchersons		For the first of 2 Toronto Sketchfest 2014 performances, The Sketchersons hosted their own show.
437	March 16	Best Of TO Sketchfest		A variety of Toronto Sketchfest 2014 participants shared the hosting duties.
438	March 23	Maxwell McCabe-Lokos		
439	March 30	@stats_canada		Members of the popular parody Twitter account and authors of the book "Stats Canada: Satire on a National Scale".
440	April 6	Rebecca Kohler		
441	April 13	Emma Hunter		
442	April 20	Hunter Collins		
443	April 27	Kristian Bruun		
444	May 4	Scott Thompson		
445	May 11	Chris Gethard		
446	May 18	Andrew Johnston	Emilie Mover	
447	May 25	Julia Hladkowicz		
448	June 1	McGee Maddox		
449	June 8	The Sufferettes (Kayla Lorette & Becky Johnson)		
450	June 15	Aaron Eves, James Hartnett, and Tom Henry		
451	June 22	Kurt Braunohler		
452	June 29	Amy Matysio		
453	July 6	Daryn McIntyre		Daryn McIntyre's final show
454	July 13	NO HOST	Heidi Brander	First edition of the Sketchersons Summer Classic - Guest stand-up: Arthur Simeon
455	July 20	NO HOST		Phil Moorhead's last show - Guest stand-up: Steve Patterson
456	July 27	NO SHOW		
457	August 3	NO HOST		Guest stand-up: Mike Wilmot
458	September 28	Mark Little, Kjartan Hewitt and Daryn McIntyre		
459	October 5	Kristian Bruun, D.J. Demers and Brian McQuarrie		
	October 12	NO SHOW - Thanksgiving		
460	October 19	Uncalled For, Steph Tolev		
461	October 26	Alana Johnston, Pat Thornton, Jeremy Woodcock		
462	November 2	Christina Walkinshaw, Amanda Brooke Perrin		
463	November 9	Special Guests: Aisha Alfa, Jon Blair		
464	November 16	Helder Brum, Inessa Frantowski, Norm Sousa		
465	November 23	Marty Topps, Daryn McIntyre		
466	November 30	Sunday Night Live Showcase Show		
467	December 7	Mark Little, Laura Cilevitz, Chris Locke		
468	December 14	Best of 2014 Guests		
469	December 21	Sunday Night Live Christmas Show		

=== 2015 ===
Show Number	Date	Host[s]	Notes
470	January 4	Missing Host	
471	January 11	No Host (Best of 2014)	
472	January 18	Missing Host	New cast members
473	January 25	Scott Thompson and Dan Galea	
474	February 1	Missing Host	
475	February 8	Missing Host	
476	February 15	Missing Host	
477	February 22	Missing Host	
478	March 1	Missing Host	
479	March 8	Missing Host	
480	March 15	Missing Host	
481	March 22	Kevin Vidal	
482	March 29	Missing Host	
483	April 5	Missing host	No Show
484	April 12	Allie Price	
485	April 19	Mark Andrada	
486	April 26	Missing host	
487	May 3	Missing host	
488	May 10	Missing host	
489	May 17	Nigel Grinstead	
490	May 24	Jess Bryson	
491	May 31	RJ City	
492	June 7	Stockyard Hurts	
493	June 14	Missing host	
494	June 21	Cameron Wyllie	
495	June 28	Paul Beer	
496	July 5	Griffin Newman	
497	July 12	Sarah Hillier	
498	July 19	Alice Moran	
499	July 26	Ann Pornel	
501	August 2	Ann Pornel	
502	August 9	Paul Brittain	
503	August 16	Junkyard Dukes	
504	August 23	Rhiannon Archer	
505	August 30	Phil Burke	
506	September 6	No Host	Best of Show
507	September 13	Gary Rideout Jr	
508	September 20	Monica Heisey	
509	September 27	No Host	
510	October 4	Kye Fox	
511	October 11	No Host	
512	October 18	Scott Adsit and John Lutz	
513	October 25	No Host	
514	November 1	Hot Cousin	Adele Marie Dicks & Kristy LaPointe
515	November 8	Vest of Friends	Marc Hallworth, Evan Richardson, Morgan George & Reid Brackenbury
516	November 15	Robby Hoffman	
517	November 22	Cassie Barradas	
518	November 29	No Host	Special Guests David Koechner & Tim Gilbert
519	December 6	Jason Deline	
520	December 13	Steph Tolev	
521	December 20	Best of Hosts 2015	

=== 2016 ===
Show Number	Date	Host(s)	Notes
522	January 10	Best of 2015!	
523	January 17	Juicy	Aliya Kanani & Dustin Hovey
524	January 24	Julia Hladkowicz	
525	February 14	Andrew Johnston	
526	February 21	Audition Show	
527	March 6	TO Sketchfest	Joel's Last show
528	March 13	TO Sketchfest Closing	
529	March 20	Pat Thornton	Sketchersons Alum
530	April 3	Nadine Djoury	
521	April 17	Sarah Hillier & Andy Hull	Sketcherons Alum
532	April 24	No Host	
533	May 1	Jackie Pirico	
534	May 8	No Host	
535	May 15	Brandon Hackett	Brandon's last show
536	May 22	Flo & Joan	Nicola & Rosie Dempsey
537	May 29	No Host	
538	June 5	Paul Beer	
539	June 19	Jocelyn Geddie	Jocelyn's last show
540	June 26	Nicky Nasrallah	
541	July 3	Rodrigo Fernandez-Stoll	
542	July 10	Amanda Brooke Perrin	
543	July 17	Nelu Handa	
544	July 24	Mark Andrada	Sketchersons Alum
545	July 31	Alex Tindal & Monica Heisy	Alex is a Sketchersons Alum
546	August 7	Sara Hennessey	
547	August 21	Paloma Nunez	
548	August 28	Kevin McDonald	Kids in the Hall
549	September 4	Pat Thornton	Sketchersons Alum
550	September 11	Sharjil Rasool	
551	September 18	No Host	
552	October 2	Leigh Cameron	
553	October 16	Natasha Negovanlis	
554	October 23	Ann Pornel	Sketchersons Alum
555	October 30	Carlos Bustamante	
556	November 6	Anders Yates	
557	November 13	Craig Anderson	
558	November 20	Kirsten Rasmussen	Sketchersons Alum
559	November 27	Parker & Seville	Dave Barclay & Matt Kowall
560	December 4	No Host	
561	December 11	Kye Fox	
562	December 18	Lance Byrd	

=== 2017 ===
Show Number	Date	Host(s)	Notes
563	January 8	Best of 2016!	
564	January 15	Nigel Grinstead	
565	January 22	Miguel Rivas	
566	January 29	Griffin Newman	
567	February 5	Christian Smith	
568	February 12	Carol Zoccoli	
569	February 19	Laura Cilevitz	Sketchersons Alum
570	March 5	Steve Boleantu	TO Sketchfest
571	March 12	Ladies & Gentlemen	Daniel Carin & Chris Sandiford
572	March 19	Pat Thornton	Sketchersons Alum
573	March 26	Justin Collette	
574	April 2	Natalie Metcalfe	
575	April 9	Andrew Johnston	
576	April 23	Roger Bainbridge	
577	April 30	Sex T-Rex	Connor Bradbury, Caitlin Morrow, Seann Murray & Julian Frid
578	May 7	Ashley Comeau	She Dot Festival Show Featuring Sketchersons Alum Allison Hogg Allana Reoch Ali Wylie Lisa Gilroy Ann Pornel Jocelyn Geddie Kiki Razzle with a special video by Sarah Hillier, Inessa Annie Frantowski and Kaitlin Mamie.
579	May 14	Tess Degenstein	
580	May 21	Jonathan Langdon	Jonathan's last show!
581	May 28	Jim Annan	
582	June 4	Audition Show	Final stage of the Sketchersons Audition process
583	June 11	Allana Reoch	Allana's last show!
583	June 18	Etan Muskat	
584	June 25	Cheap Smokes	Laura Danowski and Sketchersons Alum Kaitlin Loftus
585	July 2	Alumni Jam	Pat Thornton Gary Rideout Jr. Laura Cilevitz Alex Tindal Ann Pornel Sarah Hillier Andy Hull Jon Blair Jeremy Woodcock Jonathan Langdon Daryn McIntyre Andy Auld Joel Buxton Phil Moorhead Allana Reoch Alessandra Vite Gilly Lucci Marshall Lorenzo Colin Sharpe Allison Hogg with special musical guest: Rodrigo Fernandez-Stoll and special favourite host/friend: Lance Byrd
586	July 9	Sarah Hillier	Sketchersons Alum
587	July 16	Josh Murray	
588	July 23	Lisa Gilroy	Lisa's last show!
589	July 29	Sketchersons Experiment	An improv show!
590	July 30	Kris Siddiqi	
591	August 6	Heidi Brander	
592	August 13	Kevin McDonald	
593	August 20	Tom Henry	
594	August 27	Allison Hogg	Allison's last show!
595	September 3	Nicole Passmore	
596	September 10	Chris Wilson	
597	September 17	Stacey McGunnigle	
598	October 1	Jocelyn Geddie	Sketchersons Alum
599	October 15	Paul Bates	
600	October 22	Carson Pinch	Carson's last show!
601	October 29	Andy Hull	Sketchersons Alum
602	November 5	Dan Beirne	
603	November 12	Ted Hambly	
604	November 19	D.J Mausner	
605	November 26	Tallboyz II Men	Tim Blair, Vance Banzo, Franco Nguyen & Guled Abdi
606	December 3	Arthur Simeon	
607	December 10	Nicole Passmore & Jonathan Langdon	
608	December 17	Lance Byrd	

=== 2018 ===
Show Number	Date	Host(s)	Notes
609	January 14	Best of 2017!	
610	January 21	Ann Pornel	Sketchersons Alum
611	January 28	Courtney Gilmour	A fundraiser show for Courtney's Dream Leg Foundation
612	February 4	Jamie Cavanagh	
613	February 11	Chanty Marostica	
614	February 18	Andrew Johnston	This was the 10th time Andrew hosted!!
615	February 25	Nour Hadidi	
616	March 11	Brandon Ash-Mohammed and Hoodo Hersi	
617	March 18	Gavin Crawford	
618	March 25	Jonathan Langdon	
619	April 8	Michael Kolberg	
620	April 15	Rakhee Morzaria	
621	April 22	Cara Connors	
622	April 29	Graham Clark	
623	May 6	Christy Bruce	
624	May 13	Monica Garrido	
625	May 20	Definition of Knowledge	
626	May 27	Anne T. Donahue	
627	June 3	Sandra Battaglini	
628	June 10	Ben Beauchemin	
629	June 17	Success 5000	
630	June 24	Vicki Lix	
631	July 1	Mark Little	
632	July 8	Alessandra Vite	
633	July 15	Freddie Rivas	
634	July 22	PoC Showcase	
635	July 29	Alice Moran	
636	August 5	Izad Etemadi	
637	August 12	Phil Luzi	
638	August 19	Allie Price	
638	August 26	Gavin Pounds	
639	September 2	Summer Showcase	
640	September 8	Kevin Frank	
641	September 16	Anasimone George	
642	September 30	Jan Caruana	
643	October 14	Ryan Dillon	
644	October 21	Ted Morris	
645	October 28	Priyanka	
646	November 4	Matt Wright	
647	November 11	Vest of Friend	
648	November 18	Tim Baltz	
649	November 25	Tom Green	
650	December 2	No Host	Winterlicious Show
651	December 9	Izzy Kanaan	
652	December 16	Lance Byrd	

=== 2019 ===
Show Number	Date	Host(s)	Notes
653	January 6	No Host	BEST OF 2018!
654	January 13	Carolyn Taylor	Baroness Von Sketch Show
655	January 20	Miguel Rivas	
656	January 27	Coko & Daphney	
657	February 3	Sketchersons Audition Show	Featuring: Ajahnis Charley Cassie Cao Chelsea Larkin Chili Davidson Elias Bovard Emily Poulin Guy Bradford Jake Martin Kyah Green Luisa Rubio Nicole Passmore Patrick Murray Philip Rule Rob Lewin Spencer Thompson Tamara Appleton Tia McGregor
658	February 10	Rodrigo Fernandez-Stoll	
659	February 17	Andrew Johnston	
660	March 3	Allison Hogg	Sketchersons Alum First show with the new cast members: Ajahnis Charley Chelsea Larkin Guy Bradford Jake Martin Kyah Green Nicole Passmore Patrick Murray
661	March 10	Kyle Brownrigg	
662	March 17	Ashley Cooper	
663	March 24	Nelu Handa	
664	March 25	Alan Shane Lewis	With Special Guest Matt Wright
665	April 7	Ashley Botting	
666	April 14	RJ City	
667	April 28	Laura Cilevitz	
Montreal Sketchfest Special	May 4	Tranna Wintour	Special Sunday Night Live at THÉÂTRE SAINTE-CATHERINE in Montreal as part of Montreal Sketchfest. With special guest Sehar Manji and Musical Guest AWWFUL.
668	May 5	Hisham Kelati	
669	May 12	NO HOST	Mother's Day Special
670	May 19	Brandon Hackett	Sketchersons Alumni
671	May 26	Jess Grant	
672	June 2	Michelle McLeod	
673	June 9	Dave Merheje	
674	June 16	Tricia Black	Tricia Black's Farewell Show
675	June 23	NO HOST	Pride Edition
676	June 30	Priyanka	
677	July 7	Kelli Ogmundson	
678	July 14	Marito Lopez	
679	July 21	Salma Hindy	
680	July 28	Brian Leonard AKA Barista Brian	
681	August 4	Allana Reoch	Sketchersons Alumni
682	August 11	Kevin McDonald	Kids in the Hall Alumni
683	August 18	NO HOST	Sketchersons Summer Bash Party
684	August 25	Arthur Simeon	
686	September 1	Mark Andrada	Sketchersons Alumni
687	September 8	Devon Hyland	
688	September 15	Kaitlin Morrow	
689	September 29	Heroine	
690	October 6	Ron Pederson	MadTV Alumni
691	October 20	Martha Chaves	
692	October 27	Leonard Chan	
693	November 3	Meg MacKay	
694	November 10	Ann Pornel	Sketchersons Alumni
695	November 17	Evan Stern	
696	November 24	Kirsten Rasmussen	Sketchersons Alumni
697	December 1	Nick Nemeroff	
698	December 8	BEST OF HOSTS	Sketchersons 15 Year Anniversary Show. Featuring special guest hosts: Rodrigo Fernandez-Stoll, Ann Pornel, Brandon Hackett, Alessandra Vite, Kaitlin Morrow, Kirsten Rasmussen, Hisham Kelati, Allison Hogg, Miguel Rivas, Allana Reoch and Mark Andrada
699	December 15	Lance Byrd	Holiday Show

=== 2020 ===
Show Number	Date	Host(s)	Notes
700	January 5	NO HOST	Festival of New Formats Show
701	January 12	NO HOST	Best of 2019
702	January 19	Selena Vyle	
703	January 26	Stacey McGunnigle	
704	February 2	Alia Rasul	
705	February 16	Sarah Hillier	Sketchersons Alum
706	February 23	Kayla Lorette	Co-creator of New Eden
707	March 1	Funnies with Families (Kristie Gunter and Rockland Derek)	Show supporting Funnies with Families
708	March 8	Alessandra Vite	Sketchersons Alum
709	March 29	NO HOST	First episode of 'Sunday Night Live, LIVE on Facebook!' due to the COVID-19 pandemic. Streamed live to Facebook.
710	April 5	NO HOST	'Sunday Night Live, LIVE on Facebook!'
711	April 12	NO HOST	Live streamed show for the National Arts Centre's #CanadaPerforms series.
712	April 19	Andrew Johnston	'Sunday Night Live, LIVE on Facebook!'. Johnston's 11th time hosting.
713	April 26	Hisham Kelati	'Sunday Night Live, LIVE on Facebook!'
714	May 10	NO HOST	'Sunday Night Live, LIVE on Facebook!' Mother's Day show.
715	May 17	Inessa Frantowski	'Sunday Night Live, LIVE on Facebook!' Sketchersons Alum
716	May 24	Pat Thornton	'Sunday Night Live, LIVE on Facebook!' Sketchersons Alum
