= Dini Dimakos =

Canadian stand-up comedian

- Dini Dimakos (2007)
- Born: Toronto, Ontario, Canada
- Occupations: Stand-up comedian; social worker
- Years active: 2002–present (comedy)

Dini Dimakos (also known as Dini Dimakos Shevchenko) is a Canadian stand-up comedian and social worker of Greek heritage.

== Career ==
=== Stand-up comedy ===
Dimakos began her stand-up comedy career in Toronto in 2002, performing one-off spots before moving on to amateur nights at Yuk Yuk's. She has described her comedic style as personal, drawing material from her experiences as a single mother, dating, and her Greek family.

In July 2007, Dimakos performed at Bitch Salad, a comedy show hosted by Andrew Johnston at Buddies in Bad Times Theatre in Toronto.

=== Television ===
Dimakos appeared as a panelist on MuchMusic's Video on Trial. She also appeared on Stars Gone Wild and Love Court.

=== Later career ===
Following her entertainment career, Dimakos completed social work training and became a Registered Social Service Worker (RSSW). As of 2022, she works with the Hills of Headwaters Collaborative Ontario Health Team in Caledon, Ontario, providing support to healthcare workers and their families throughout Dufferin County.
