= Last Comic Standing season 5 =

Last Comic Standing
- Season 5
- No. of episodes: 17

Release
- Original network: NBC
- Original release: June 13 – September 19, 2007

Season chronology
- ← Previous; Last Comic Standing 4 Next → Last Comic Standing 6

On June 13, 2007, competitive reality show Last Comic Standing began airing its fifth season on NBC with new host, Bill Bellamy. For the first time ever people could vote in Canada, Australia, and the United Kingdom. This season is also taped rather than filmed.

== Auditions ==
Auditions were held in London, Montreal, Sydney, Los Angeles, New York, Minneapolis, San Antonio and Tempe.

Numerous established comedians auditioned for Last Comic Standing this season. They included:

- Arj Barker
- Chuck Roy
- Thea Vidale (Thea)
- Dwayne Kennedy
- Claire Hooper (Good News Week)
- Fiona O'Loughlin
- Josh Thomas (Talkin' 'bout your Generation)
- Lawrence Mooney

Some of the finalists have also appeared elsewhere:

- Dante (BET's Comic View)
- Doug Benson (Best Week Ever, Marijuana Logues)
- Gerry Dee (Trailer Park Boys: The Movie)
- Lavell Crawford (Breaking Bad)
- Debra DiGiovanni (Video on Trial)
- Ralph Harris (On Our Own)
- Jon Reep (Premium Blend, Bandits vs. Smokies, Dodge Ram Hemi commercials)
- Amy Schumer (Inside Amy Schumer, Trainwreck, various others)
- Gina Yashere (Mock the Week, Gina's Laughing Gear, Comic Relief Does Fame Academy)

== Season 5 Results ==
Elimination Chart
Comics	Head-to-head			Public elimination			
Comics	Ep 7	Ep 8	Ep 9	Ep 10	Ep 11	Ep 12	Ep 13
Jon Reep	IN	SAFE	IN	IN	IN	IN	LCS
Lavell Crawford	SAFE	IN	IN	IN	IN	IN	OUT
Gerry Dee	IN	IN	IN	IN	IN	OUT	
Amy Schumer	IN	IN	SAFE	IN	OUT		
Ralph Harris	WIN	IN	WIN	OUT			
Doug Benson	IN	IN	OUT				
Matt Kirshen	IN	WIN	OUT				
Debra DiGiovanni	IN	OUT					
Dante	OUT						
Gina Yashere	OUT						

LCS means the comic was the last comic standing
SAFE means the comic won the immunity challenge
WIN means the comic participated and won the head-to-head showdown
OUT means the comic lost in the head-to-head showdown or by viewer voting and was eliminated

== Episode guide ==
=== Episodes 1-6 ===
Episodes 1-6 consisted of the early auditions and the selection of the finalists.

=== Episode 7 ===
==== Immunity challenge: Heckler Challenge ====
The contestants were driven to The Ice House, where they were paired up. One performed on stage while the other sat in the audience heckling them about their jokes. They then switched roles. The best heckler and the best performer would be rewarded with immunity. The winner for dealing the best with the heckler was Lavell Crawford.

The pairs for this challenge are as follows:

- Lavell Crawford and Debra DiGiovanni
- Amy Schumer and Matt Kirshen
- Ralph Harris and Gina Yashere
- Jon Reep and Gerry Dee
- Dante and Doug Benson

==== Head to Head ====
Ralph Harris, Gina Yashere, and Dante all tied in the main vote, they went head-to-head. Ralph Harris gained the majority of the audience vote, sending the other two home.

=== Episode 8 ===
==== Immunity challenge: Jester Challenge ====
The comics were driven to Medieval Times where they were told that they were going to dress up like court jesters and tell Medieval jokes in front of an audience. Jon Reep beat Amy Schumer in the finals to win immunity.

==== Head to Head ====
This episode's head to head put Debra DiGiovanni against Matt Kirshen. Matt beat Debra by a narrow margin (in the closest head-to-head vote the show had ever had) to stay in the competition.

=== Episode 9 ===
==== Immunity Challenge: Speed Joking ====
The contestants were told that they would have ninety seconds to tell jokes to six Deal or No Deal models. However, the contestants didn't know that four of the deal or No Deal models were switched out for a drag queen, a nun, and a clown. After everyone was through, the women picked Amy Schumer as their favorite comedian.

==== Head to Head ====
Matt Kirshen, Doug Benson, and Ralph Harris were chosen to compete in the head to head. After their performances in the Last Comic Theatre, it was revealed that Ralph Harris had the most votes to become the last person to make the final five.

=== Episode 10 ===
The final five performed in front of a live audience for five minutes each. After all five had performed, the phone lines opened to let home viewers vote for their favorite comic. The one with the fewest votes would be eliminated. Each comic had a short bio before their performance.

=== Episode 11 ===
Ralph Harris was eliminated for having the lowest number of votes. The remaining contestants performed another stand-up routine for five minutes. Doug Benson made a guest performance.

=== Episode 12 ===
Amy Schumer received the lowest number of votes and was subsequently the first of the final four to leave the competition. Josh Blue from season four and Harland Williams performed. Jon Reep, Lavell Crawford, and Gerry Dee performed five-minute sets. Before their performances, NBC showed clips of them at their old jobs, where Dee was a waiter, Crawford was a crossing guard, and Reep worked at a tire store.

=== Episode 13 ===
Kathleen Madigan, Gilbert Gottfried, and Greg Proops made guest performances. Afterward, Gerry Dee was eliminated from the competition as he received the fewest votes. Reep and Crawford performed their acts in anticipation of the following week's final episode.

=== Finale ===
Jon Reep beat Lavell Crawford in the two-hour finale.
