= Matt O'Brien (comedian) =

Canadian comedian

Matt O'Brien is a Canadian stand-up comedian from London, Ontario, most noted as the 2010 winner of SiriusXM Canada's Canada's Top Comic competition.

He received a Canadian Comedy Award nomination for Best Breakout Artist at the 15th Canadian Comedy Awards in 2014, and has performed regularly at comedy venues such as Yuk Yuk's and Comedy Bar.

He has appeared on The Debaters, Video on Trial and Cocktales.

He is married to fellow comedian Julia Hladkowicz. In 2025, O'Brien and Hladkowicz roasted each other in a Season 5 episode of Roast Battle Canada, and auditioned back to back for the 20th season of America's Got Talent.
