= Manivald =

2017 animated film directed by Chintis Lundgren

- Directed by: Chintis Lundgren
- Written by: Drasko Ivezic; Chintis Lundgren
- Produced by: Drasko Ivezic; Chintis Lundgren; Jelena Popovic
- Starring: Trevor Boris; France Castel; Tyrone Benskin; Drasko Ivezic; Chintis Lundgren
- Music by: Terence Dunn
- Production companies: Chintis Lundgreni Animatsioonistuudio; Adriatic Animation; National Film Board of Canada
- Distributed by: New Europe Film Sales
- Release date: 2017
- Running time: 13 minutes
- Countries: Canada; Croatia; Estonia
- Language: English

Manivald is an animated short film, directed by Chintis Lundgren and released in 2017.

== Plot ==
The film centres on Manivald (Trevor Boris), an underachieving fox in his early 30s who still lives with his mother (France Castel), but finds their relationship endangered when they simultaneously fall in love with Toomas (Drasko Ivezic), the handsome wolf repairman who arrives to fix their washing machine.

== Production ==
The film, adapted from Lundgren's prior webcomic Manivald and the Absinthe Rabbits, was created as a pilot for an animated series, in which Manivald would move out of his mother's house and take up residence at The Hedgehog's Closet, a gay bar run by a cross-dressing hedgehog. The series was also planned to incorporate characters from Lundgren's prior animated short film Life with Herman H. Rott. As of 2019, however, no series pickup has been announced; however, Toomas' own family life was the subject of Lundgren's 2019 animated short film Toomas Beneath the Valley of the Wild Wolves. The film was also added to internet streaming platforms, including Facebook, YouTube, Vimeo and the National Film Board of Canada's website, in 2019.

== Reception ==
The film was a Canadian Screen Award nominee for Best Animated Short Film at the 6th Canadian Screen Awards. The film is currently available to purchase on Amazon Prime Video.
