= Lavell Crawford =

American comedian and actor (born 1968)

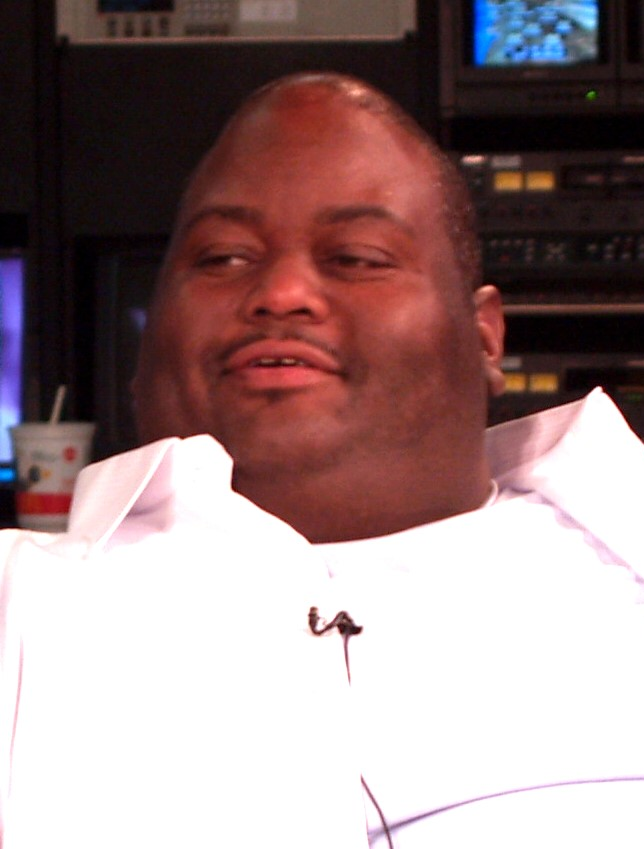
- Crawford in 2008
- Born: Lavell Maurice Crawford; November 11, 1968 (age 57); St. Louis, Missouri, U.S.
- Education: Missouri Western State College

Comedy career
- Years active: 1990–present
- Medium: Stand-up; television
- Website: comedianlavellcrawford.com

Lavell Maurice Crawford (born November 11, 1968) is an American comedian and actor, known for playing Huell Babineaux in Breaking Bad (2011–2013) and its spin-off Better Call Saul (2017–2022). He also played the role of Gus Patch in the Netflix original film The Ridiculous 6 (2015). The album version of his 2021 Comedy Vaccine special was nominated for the Grammy Award for Best Comedy Album at the 64th Annual Grammy Awards.

== Early life ==
Lavell Maurice Crawford was born in St. Louis, Missouri, on November 11, 1968, and grew up in nearby Pagedale. Crawford has two sisters, Elonda and Erica. He struggled with his weight in childhood and experienced a near-drowning at age ten. Crawford graduated from Pattonville High School in 1986 before attending Missouri Western State College, where he studied computer science.

== Career ==
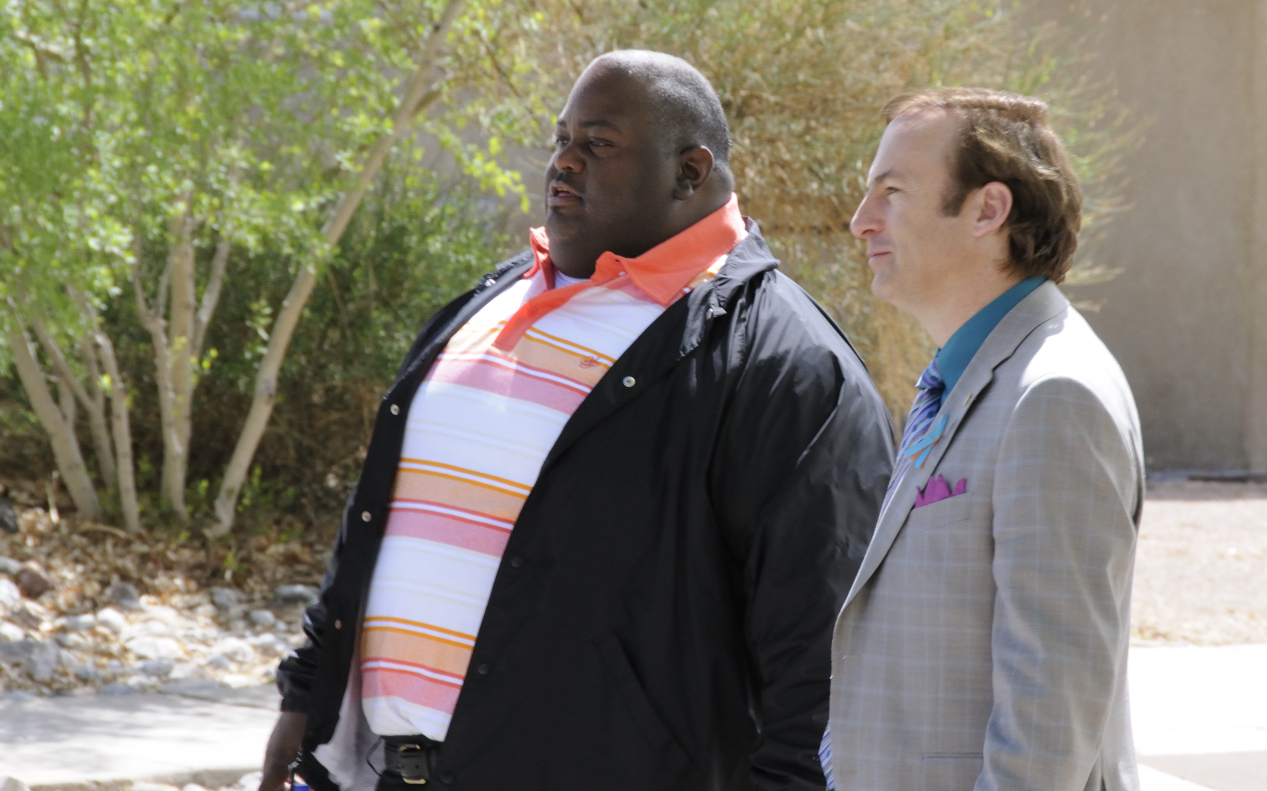
Crawford (left) and Bob Odenkirk as Huell and Saul during filming of the fourth season of Breaking Bad

Crawford began performing standup comedy professionally in 1990. He frequently performed on BET's ComicView during the 1990s. He was a contestant on NBC's Last Comic Standing in 2007, where in the two-hour season finale he lost to Jon Reep. In 2011 at the Roberts Orpheum Theatre in St. Louis, he recorded Lavell Crawford: Can a Brother Get Some Love.

Crawford portrayed Saul Goodman's bodyguard Huell Babineaux in the crime drama series Breaking Bad and its spinoff, Better Call Saul, from 2011 to 2022. He also played Babineaux in Huell's Rules, a non-canonical comedy short set after the events of Breaking Bad. Crawford has also appeared in comedic roles in It's Always Sunny in Philadelphia, Tosh.0, The Nightly Show with Larry Wilmore, and Aqua TV Show Show.

== Personal life ==
Crawford's weight peaked in March 2016 at approximately 500 pounds (230 kg). After gastric sleeve surgery, his weight dropped to 298 pounds (135 kg) by August 2017.

== Filmography ==
=== Film ===
Year	Title	Role	Notes
1999	Beverly Hood	Lil Bit	
2004	Out on Parole	Little Bit	Video
2004	Baby's Momma Drama		
2005	Friends and Lovers	Bobby	Video
2010	Love Chronicles: Secrets Revealed	Willie	Video
2012	Who's Watching the Kids	Jojo	
2012	What Goes Around Comes Around	Pete the Postman	Video
2012	Trading Up: Behind the Green Door	Barry Harris	Short
2013	Je'Caryous Johnson's Marriage Material	Bishop Luther Lance Love Jones	
2013	Huell's Rules	Huell Babineaux	Video Short
2013	Sperm Boat	Smokestack	Television film
2014	4Play	Tiko	
2014	For Love or Money	Big Daddy	
2015	American Ultra	Big Harold	
2015	The Ridiculous 6	Gus Patch	
2016	Meet the Blacks	Parole Officer	
2016	Mike and Dave Need Wedding Dates	Keith	
2016	Boo! A Madea Halloween	Prisoner #1	
2018	Compton's Finest	Bubbles	
2019	Love Is Not Enough	Brother Winters	
2020	Hubie Halloween	Farmer Dan	
2021	On the Count of Three	Donny	
2021	Horror Noire	Samuel	
2022	Home Team	Gus	
2022	Aqua Teen Forever: Plantasm	Street Tough	Video
2025	Freak	Will	Short
2025	Happy Gilmore 2	Slim Peterson	

=== Television ===
Year	Title	Role	Notes
1990	It's Showtime at the Apollo	Himself	Episode: "Episode #4.1"
1992–2004	ComicView	Himself	4 episodes
1995	Def Comedy Jam	Himself	Episode: "Episode #5.8"
1998	Motown Live	Himself	Episode: "Episode #1.6"
2000	The Jamie Foxx Show	Partygoer	Episode: "Partner fo' Life"
2003–2006	Laffapalooza	Himself	2 episodes
2004	Premium Blend	Himself	Episode: "Comedy Central's Premium Blend"
2004	Steve Harvey's Big Time Challenge	Himself	Episode: "Episode #2.4"
2005	The Tom Joyner Show	Himself	Episode: "Episode #1.10"
2007	Last Comic Standing	Himself	Season 5
2008	Comedy Central Presents	Himself	Episode: "Lavell Crawford"
2008	Reality Bites Back	Himself	TV series
2009	Fanboy & Chum Chum	Mr. Hank Mufflin	Season 1
2011	Workaholics	Strip Club DJ	Episode: "Dry Guys"
2011–2013	Breaking Bad	Huell Babineaux	Recurring cast: season 4, 5b; Guest: season 5a
2013	It's Always Sunny in Philadelphia	Landslide	Episode: "The Gang Broke Dee"
2013	Squidbillies	Judge Jammer	Voice, episode: "Stop. Jammertime!"
2013	The Crazy Ones	Marvin	Episode: "Models Love Magic"
2013–2015	Aqua Teen Hunger Force	Unbelievable Ron, Chimp Alien	Voice, 3 episodes
2014	Super Fun Night	Antwan	Episode: "Lil' Big Kim"
2014	Biatches	Additional Voices	Voice
2014	Funny or Die	Huell Babineaux	Web series, Episode: Huell's Rules
2015	Your Pretty Face Is Going to Hell	Psyklone	Voice, episode: "Psyklone and the Thin Twins"
2016–2017	Legends of Chamberlain Heights	LaDante	Voice, main cast
2017	New Girl	Trevlo	Episode: "Operation: Bobcat"
2017–2022	Better Call Saul	Huell Babineaux	Guest: season 3, recurring cast: season 4–6

=== Stand-up specials ===
- Can a Brother Get Some Love? (2011)
- Home for the Holidays (2017)
- New Look Same Comedy (2019)
- The Comedy Vaccine (2021)
- Thee Lavell Crawford (2023)
