= Rebecca Addelman =

Canadian comedian and writer

- Born: 1981 (age 44–45)
- Education: University of Toronto; Humber College
- Occupation: Comedic writer

Rebecca Addelman (born 1981) is a Canadian comedian, writer, director and actress living in Los Angeles, California. She was a writer on Fox's sitcom New Girl and is the creator of Guilty Party.

== Background and education ==
Addelman is from Ottawa, Ontario. She was born in a Jewish family. She received a B.A. in literature at the University of Toronto (2004) and studied comedy writing and performance at Humber College (2005). After several years working as a copy editor and performing stand-up comedy, Addelman moved to Los Angeles in 2008.

== Career ==
While performing stand-up comedy in Canada, Addelman was nominated for The Cream of Comedy and wrote humor articles for The Walrus and Toro Magazine, where she has a bi-monthly column. Addelman performs with Toronto comedians Holly Prazoff and Inessa Frantowski as "HIR". She has also appeared as a panelist on the Much Music show Video on Trial.

Addelman has written for the CURRENT TV animated sketch-comedy show SuperNews!, as well as appearing in the HEEB 100 (whose book, "Sex, Drugs, and Gefilte Fish", she also contributed to). In April and May 2010 she co-wrote and performed "The Holly and Rebecca Show: A Very Special episode" with Prazoff at the Upright Citizens Brigade Theatre in Los Angeles.

Addelman worked as a staff writer and story editor on Fox's sitcom New Girl beginning in the show's second season.

Addelman wrote and directed the 2018 movie Paper Year, which is loosely based on her own failed marriage. In 2021, she created the show Guilty Party.

== Personal life ==
At age 23, Addelman married Will Weldon, who was 19 at the time. The marriage lasted six years. Addelman has one daughter, Hannah Beth Bissonnette, with partner Matthew Bissonnette.
