= Trevor Boris =

Canadian comedian (born 1980)

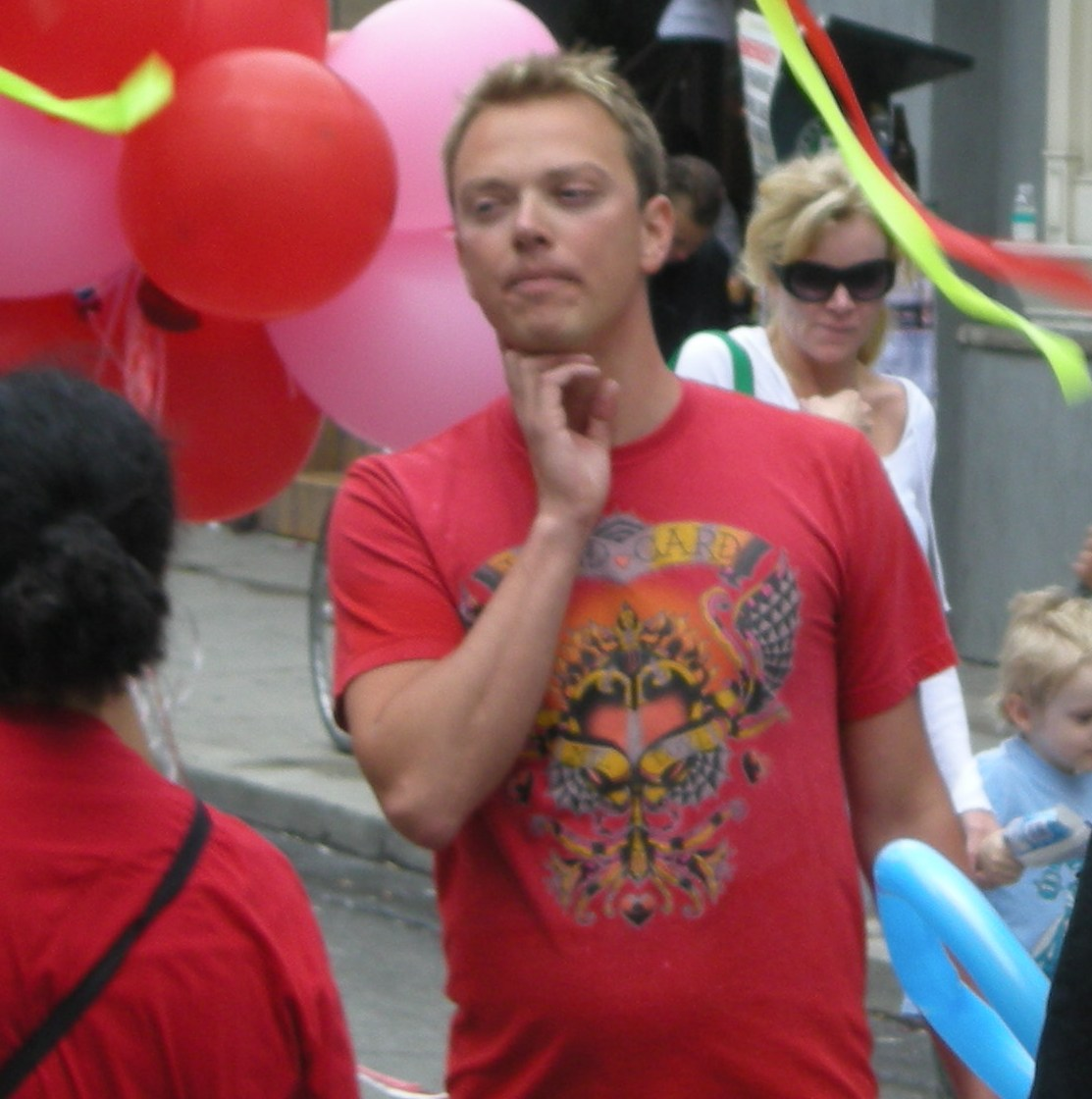
- Born: September 10, 1980 (age 46); Selkirk, Manitoba, Canada
- Notable work: Video on Trial, Canada's Got Talent, Big Brother Canada

Comedy career
- Medium: Stand-up, television
- Subject: Homosexuality

Trevor Boris (born September 10, 1980) is a Canadian comedian, writer and television producer.

== Television work ==
Boris is one of the stars of MuchMusic's Video on Trial, and is also a star of Stars Gone Wild. He has appeared on many other MuchMusic specials, including Stars on Trial, LOL!, Spring Break '07, Totally 80s Video on Trial, Video on Trial: Holiday Crap, Overrated in 06, and wrote the special Famous Fallouts. He was a producer of Video on Trial at one point, as well as a presenter at the 2006 MuchMusic Video Awards and a spokesperson for Sunsilk, which aired numerous Hair on Trial commercials on MuchMusic. He also made an appearance on The Latest Buzz on Family Channel.

In 2007, Boris had his very own Comedy Now! standup special air on CTV and The Comedy Network, was the runner-up in the 2006 Great Canadian Laugh Off (the winner received $25,000) that aired on The Comedy Network, and was the host of the same-sex wedding show I Now Pronounce You... on OUTtv. He has been nominated twice for the "Best Stand-up Newcomer" Canadian Comedy Award, and has performed at the Just for Laughs Comedy Festival, as well as at the CBC Winnipeg, Halifax, Vancouver Comedy Festivals, and the 2006 Cape Town Comedy Festival in South Africa.

He has been featured numerous times on entertainment shows, such as eTalk Daily, Star! Daily, Inside Jam!, CBC Television's The National and CBC Radio One's The Debaters, and has been featured on the cover of NOW in Toronto. He has also written for The National Post.

In addition, he was part of season five of Last Comic Standing when they auditioned in Montreal, Quebec. He made it to the Finals of Canada (Top 15) but did not advance to L.A.

In 2012, Trevor made his late-night U.S. TV debut when he performed standup comedy on Conan.

He has worked as a television producer, most recently as a Supervising Producer on Big Brother Canada. Since the first season, he has been the voice of Marsha the Moose, a magical moose who lives in the house and occasionally gives secret tasks to the houseguests. Marsha became a hit and is now seen once a season. Since season two of the show, he has served as a challenge producer, coming up with different challenges. He also worked on Season 18 of Big Brother USA in LA in 2016. He also produced Canada's Got Talent, which was retired after one season.

== Personal life ==
He is openly gay.

== Filmography ==
Film
Year	Show	Role	Notes
2017	Manivald	Manivald	Voice; Short film

=== Television ===
Television
Year	Show	Role	Notes
2002	Halifax Comedy Festival	Himself	
2003	Fairy Tale	Writer	
2005	I Now Pronounce You...	Head writer	
2005	Famous Fallouts	Writer	TV movie
2005	Stars on Trial	Himself	
2006–2014	Video on Trial	Himself/Juror	Producer; Writer
2006	Great Canadian Laugh Off	Himself	
2006	Headlines on Trial	Himself	
2006	MuchMusic Video Awards	Presenter	
2006	Overrated in '06	Himself	
2007–2010	Winnipeg Comedy Festival	Writer	
2007	Comedy Now!	Writer	
2007	MuchMusic Video Awards	Writer	
2007	Stars Gone Wild	Himself	
2007	We're Funny That Way!	Himself	
2008	One Night Stand Up	Himself	
2009	Juno Awards	Writer	
2009	Canada's Next Top Model	Interviewer	
2009	Howie Do It		
2009–2010	The Latest Buzz	Boris / Glee-Phone Seller	2 episodes
2010	MuchMusic Video Awards	Writer	
2010	CBC Winnipeg Comedy Festival	Contributing writer	Uncredited
2011	The Debaters	Himself	Episodes: "Childless Women & Urban Chickens," "GPS & Adult Kids at Home," and "Rise of China & Band the Pride Parade"
2011	Canada's Got Talent	Producer	
2013–2014	Never Ever Do This at Home	Development producer	
2013–present	Big Brother Canada	Executive Producer	Challenge producer, Senior producer, Tour Guide, Voice of Marsha the Moose
2014	Delivery	Himself	
2016	Big Brother (U.S.)	Challenge producer	Season 18
2017	Manivald	Manivald	Voice
2018	Celebrity Big Brother (British TV series)	Senior producer	Series 22
2018	Big Brother (British TV series)	Senior producer	Series 19
2021	Canada's Drag Race	Showrunner / Executive producer	Season 2–3

== Awards and nominations ==
Year	Nominated work	Event	Award	Result
2004	Himself	Canadian Comedy Awards	Pretty Funny Stand-up Newcomer	Nominated
2005	Himself	Canadian Comedy Awards	Pretty Funny Stand-up Newcomer	Nominated
2022	Canada's Drag Race	Canadian Screen Awards	Best Reality/Competition Series	Won
