= You Gotta Eat Here! =

Canadian food reality television series

- Genre: Food reality television
- Written by: Sarah Nixey
- Directed by: Jim Morrison IV
- Presented by: John Catucci
- Country of origin: Canada
- Original language: English
- No. of seasons: 5
- No. of episodes: 150

Production
- Executive producers: Michael Geddes; Sheldon Teicher
- Producers: Rachel Horvath; Steven R. Mitchell
- Running time: 22 minutes
- Production companies: Shaw Media; Lone Eagle Entertainment

Original release
- Network: Food Network Canada
- Release: January 6, 2012 – December 2, 2016

You Gotta Eat Here! is a Canadian food reality television series that aired on Food Network Canada from January 6, 2012 to December 2, 2016. Produced by Lone Eagle Entertainment, the program was hosted by comedian John Catucci.

The show featured Catucci on a tour to discover great restaurants (three per episode). He visited restaurants ranging from greasy spoons to legendary locations to taste the food that made them famous and to meet the characters that make them institutions. Catucci also explored the kitchens to reveal their signature recipes. Most episodes focused on restaurants in Canada or the United States, although Catucci also sometimes visited restaurants in Europe for special themed episodes.

The series won two Canadian Screen Awards, for Best Lifestyle or Talk Program or Series and Best Direction in a Lifestyle/Practical Information Program or Series, at the 2nd Canadian Screen Awards in 2014. It also garnered nominations at the 3rd Canadian Screen Awards in 2015 for Best Lifestyle or Talk Program or Series and Best Direction in a Lifestyle/Practical Information Program or Series.

On June 15, 2017, Food Network Canada announced the cancellation of the series after five seasons.

From 2019 to 2023, reruns aired in the United States on Dabl.
