= Dante (comedian) =

American comedian, talent agent and activist (born 1970)

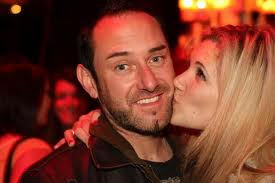
- Dante Rusciolelli with girlfriend Rebekah Kochan
- Born: Jay Dante Rusciolelli; October 2, 1970 (age 56); Ridgecrest, California, United States
- Occupations: Activist, Actor, Agent, Comedian, Writer
- Years active: 1986–present
- Spouse: Rebekah Kochan
- Website: comicdante.com

Dante (real name Jay Dante Rusciolelli; born October 2, 1970) is an American comedian, talent agent and activist from Ridgecrest, California. Dante is the youngest of four children. In 1982, Dante and his parents moved to San Diego where he attended Patrick Henry High School.

On November 24, 2018, he married his long time girlfriend and business partner Rebekah Kochan. Instagram

Dante starred in the 1996 BET sitcom The Blackberry Inn. In 2007, he appeared in season 5 of Last Comic Standing on NBC, and was eliminated in episode 7, the first of seven elimination episodes.

Dante ran for mayor of Los Angeles in 2001.
