= Too Much Information (TV series) =

Canadian comedy panel show

Too Much Information (or TMI) is a Canadian comedy panel show, which aired on Super Channel for two seasons in 2014–2015. The series was produced by Lone Eagle Entertainment and hosted by Norm Sousa, with regular panelists including Canadian comedians such as Ron Sparks, Lauren Ash, Andrew Johnston, Carla Collins and Stewart Francis.

== Awards ==
The show was nominated for Best TV Series at the 2015 Canadian Comedy Awards.
