= Guilty Party (TV series) =

American dark comedy streaming television series

- Genre: Dark comedy
- Created by: Rebecca Addelman
- Starring: Kate Beckinsale; Geoff Stults; Jules Latimer; Tiya Sircar; Alanna Ubach; Laurie Davidson; Andre Hyland
- Composer: Heather McIntosh
- Country of origin: United States
- Original language: English
- No. of seasons: 1
- No. of episodes: 10

Production
- Executive producers: Kate Beckinsale; Rebecca Addelman; Trent O'Donnell; Sam Hansen; Jimmy Miller; Joe Farrell; Jim Ziegler; Mike Farah
- Production location: Canada
- Camera setup: Single-camera
- Production companies: CBS Studios; Funny or Die; Mosaic

Original release
- Network: Paramount+
- Release: October 14 – December 9, 2021

Guilty Party is an American dark comedy television series adapted from a screenplay by Rebecca Addelman and directed by Trent O'Donnell. The series stars Kate Beckinsale, Geoff Stults, Jules Latimer, Tiya Sircar, Alanna Ubach, Laurie Davidson and Andre Hyland. The series premiered on October 14, 2021 on Paramount+.

In January 2023, the series was removed from Paramount+.

== Premise ==
A journalist Beth Burgess (Kate Beckinsale) with a tarnished reputation focuses on a story about a woman who denies murdering her husband.

== Cast ==
- Kate Beckinsale as Beth Burgess
- Geoff Stults as Marco Strzalkowski
- Jules Latimer as Toni
- Tiya Sircar as Fiona
- Alanna Ubach as Tessa Flores
- Laurie Davidson as George
- Andre Hyland as Wyatt

== Episodes ==
No.	Title	Directed by	Written by	Original release date
1	"The Last Real Journalist Working in Denver"	Trent O'Donnell	Rebecca Addelman	October 14, 2021
2	"Crazy Bitches Who Kill"	Trent O'Donnell	Rebecca Addelman	October 14, 2021
3	"You Might Be All She's Got"	Morenike Joela Evans	Chris Provenzano	October 21, 2021
4	"Let's Make This Man Hurt"	Trent O'Donnell	Ben Smith	October 28, 2021
5	"Stop Being a Coward and Take the Meat"	Morenike Joela Evans	Sonia Denis	November 4, 2021
6	"Your Mama Loves You"	Morenike Joela Evans	Ally Israelson	November 11, 2021
7	"A Denver Ten"	Stacey Muhammad	Vanessa Baden Kelly	November 18, 2021
8	"I Thought We Were Friends"	Stacey Muhammad	Steve Toltz	November 25, 2021
9	"Acts of Devotion"	Rebecca Addelman	Chris Provenzano	December 2, 2021
10	"Guilty Party"	Rebecca Addelman	Rebecca Addelman	December 9, 2021

== Production ==
It was announced in March 2020 that Isla Fisher was cast to star in the series, which was greenlit by CBS All Access. However by December, Fisher would exit the series due to concerns regarding the COVID-19 pandemic, with Kate Beckinsale cast to replace her. In March 2021, Geoff Stults, Jules Latimer, Tiya Sircar, Alanna Ubach, Laurie Davidson and Andre Hyland were added to the cast.

Filming in the series had begun by March 2021 in Calgary.

The series premiered October 14, 2021.

== Reception ==
The review aggregator website Rotten Tomatoes reported a 40% approval rating with an average rating of 5.50/10, based on 10 critic reviews.
