= Video on Trial season 9 =

Video on Trial
- Season 9
- No. of episodes: 4

Release
- Original network: Much
- Original release: June 8 – July 6, 2014

The ninth and final season of the Canadian television comedy series Video on Trial premiered on Much on June 8, 2014 and concluded on July 6, 2014. It consists of only four episodes.

== Production ==
For the ninth season of Video on Trial the series was drastically revamped, with Aisha Alfa and Paul Lemieux starring in this new version, which was not well received by the show's fans. The short-lived season introduced a strictly controlled format featuring reoccurring sketches and segments, until being cancelled by Much's corporate parent Bell Media on July 11, 2014, officially announced as part of an internal job reduction but most likely due to a change in broadcasting policies as well as poor ratings and fan backlash.

== Episodes ==
No. overall	No. in season	Panel	Original release date
247	1	Aisha Alfa and Paul Lemieux	June 8, 2014
The following videos are featured: 1. "Dark Horse" – Katy Perry featuring Juicy J 2. "Confident" – Justin Bieber featuring Chance the Rapper; 3. "Hello" – Lionel Richie ("Aisha's Pick"); 4. "Can't Remember to Forget You" – Shakira featuring Rihanna; 5. "Tik Tok" – Kesha ("Random Music Video Generator"); 6. "#Sexercise" – Jason Rosell ("Viral Video of the Week"); 7. "Happy" – Pharrell Williams
248	2	Aisha Alfa and Paul Lemieux	June 15, 2014
The following videos are featured: 1. "Birthday" – Katy Perry; 2. "#Selfie" – The Chainsmokers; 3. "Surfboard" – Cody Simpson; 4. "We Can't Stop" – Miley Cyrus; 5. "Pretty Hurts" – Beyoncé; 6. "Hollaback Girl" – Gwen Stefani ("Aisha's Pick"); 7. "Hypnotize U" – N.E.R.D. ("Random Music Video Generator")
249	3	Aisha Alfa and Paul Lemieux	June 22, 2014
The following videos are featured: 1. "I Luh Ya Papi" – Jennifer Lopez featuring French Montana; 2. "Timber" – Pitbull featuring Kesha; 3. "Turn Down for What" – DJ Snake and Lil Jon; 4. "Dancing in the Street" – David Bowie and Mick Jagger ("The Vault"); 5. "I Knew You Were Trouble" – Taylor Swift ("Aisha's Pick"); 6. "Cola Song" – Inna featuring J Balvin ("Paul's Pick" and "International Video")
250	4	Aisha Alfa and Paul Lemieux	July 6, 2014
The following videos are featured: 1. "Midnight Memories" – One Direction; 2. "Loyal" – Chris Brown featuring Lil Wayne and Tyga; 3. "Problem" – Ariana Grande featuring Iggy Azalea; 4. "If I Were a Boy" – Beyoncé ("Random Music Video Generator"); 5. "I Got U" – Duke Dumont featuring Jax Jones; 6. "La La La" – Naughty Boy featuring Sam Smith; 7. "Check the O.R." – Organized Rhyme ("The Vault")
