= The Doodlebops =

Canadian television series and band

- The Doodlebops Live! in Ottawa, Ontario, circa April 2006
- Genre: Musical; Children's
- Created by: Michael Hirsh; Carl Lennox
- Developed by: Kim Thompson
- Directed by: Jamie Waese; David Connolly (S3)
- Country of origin: Canada
- Original language: English
- No. of seasons: 3
- No. of episodes: 65

Production
- Executive producer: Michael Hirsh
- Producer: Jamie Waese
- Running time: 21 minutes
- Production company: Cookie Jar Entertainment (Note: As Doodlebops Productions (Note: Numbered using roman numerals for Seasons 2 and 3) Inc.)

Original release
- Network: CBC Television
- Release: April 11, 2005 – November 17, 2007

The Doodlebops is a Canadian live action musical-comedy children's television series produced by Cookie Jar Entertainment (now WildBrain) for CBC Television in Canada, although the series aired in the United States on Disney Channel's Playhouse Disney (now known as Disney Junior) from April 11, 2005 to November 17, 2007. The series combines music, choreography, humour, and skits to teach social lessons. It included scenes from a concert in front of preschool audiences.

== Characters ==
The members of The Doodlebops consisted of actors Lisa Lennox, Chad McNamara, and Jonathan Wexler wearing coloured costumes and prosthetic makeup to portray fictional musical acts. With a predictable storyline, each episode consisted of some major problems which the three main characters had to resolve.

=== Main ===
- Deedee Doodle (keyboards, keytar, vocals) (portrayed by Lisa Lennox) is dressed in pink with a pink "bob" haircut and a purple headband. She plays the keytar and the keyboards and is the lead vocalist for numerous songs, including "Different Things", "Tick Tock", "Tap, Tap, Tap", and "When The Lights Go Out". She is the only female in the group.
- Rooney Doodle (guitar, vocals) (portrayed by Chad McNamara) is dressed in blue. He also plays the guitar. Like his outfit, both his hair (in dreadlocks) and ukulele are blue. He also has a red beret and matching shoes. He is an inventor and likes to watch demolition derbies.
- Moe Doodle (drums, vocals) (portrayed by Jonathan Wexler) is dressed in orange. His hair (in a mullet) is red. He plays the drums and is known for his loud and messy antics. He also likes to breakdance. In the beginning of each episode, called "Where's Moe?", Deedee and Rooney try to find him when he's hiding. In the segment called "Don't Pull the Rope" in each episode, he pulls a red velvet rope and water completely drenches him.

=== Supporting ===
- Bus Driver Bob (portrayed by John Catucci) drives the Doodlebop bus. He knows how to play the guitar, but is shy about it and only plays for himself. He also has a twin brother named Bus Driver Rob and another off-screen brother named Obear.
- Mazz (portrayed by Kim Roberts) is the Doodlebops' manager during season 1 and Jazzmin's sister. She is African-Canadian.
- Jazzmin (portrayed by Jackie Richardson) is the manager of the Doodlebops for the final two seasons, replacing Mazz, her sister. Jazzmin, who can play the harp, aspires to be a stage actress. She can disappear by snapping her fingers.
- Jumping Judy (portrayed by dancer Stacey Bafi-Yeboa (credited as Stacey Martin)) is Mazz's cousin who bounces when she moves.
- Audio Murphy (voiced by Jason Hopley in season 2 and Frank Meschkuleit in season 3) is an anthropomorphic blue dog who acts as the Doodlebops' video producer. He is a puppet that first appeared in season 2. He claims that his middle name is "A Surprise". He likes to knit.
- Mudge (voiced by Rob Stefaniuk) is an anthropomorphic purple cat who is often the sufferer of Deedee's knock-knock jokes. He lives in the house's mirror.
- Mr. Moosehead (voiced by Rob Stefaniuk) is a taxidermic moose which hangs on the wall of the Doodlebops' clubhouse. He is loosely based on the Banana Vac from the 1970s show The Banana Splits.

== Episodes ==
=== Series overview ===
Season	Episodes	Originally released	
Season	Episodes	First released	Last released
1	26	April 11, 2005	January 9, 2006
2	26	March 13, 2006	March 5, 2007
3	13	April 9, 2007	November 16, 2007

=== Season 1 (2005) ===
No. overall	No. in season	Title	Original release date
1	1	"Doodlebop Photo Op"	April 11, 2005
2	2	"Keep Trying"	April 11, 2005
3	3	"O Solo Moe"	April 12, 2005
4	4	"Cauliflower Power"	April 13, 2005
5	5	"All Together Now"	April 14, 2005
6	6	"Tap Tap Tap"	April 15, 2005
7	7	"Bird is the Word"	April 18, 2005
8	8	"Count On Me"	April 18, 2005
9	9	"Fast and Slow Moe"	April 19, 2005
10	10	"Jumpin' Judy"	April 20, 2005
11	11	"Very Scary"	April 21, 2005
12	12	"Queen for a Deedee"	April 22, 2005
13	13	"The Move Groove"	April 25, 2005
14	14	"Strudel Doodle"	May 2, 2005
15	15	"Look in a Book"	May 9, 2005
16	16	"High and Low"	May 16, 2005
17	17	"Gibble Gobble Nabber Gabber"	May 23, 2005
18	18	"The Bad Day"	April 26, 2005
19	19	"Wobbly Whoopsie"	May 17, 2005
20	20	"What When Why?"	May 18, 2005
21	21	"Roar Like a Dinosaur"	June 22, 2005
22	22	"Growing Moe"	August 29, 2005
23	23	"AbracaDeedee"	May 24, 2005
24	24	"What Did You See Today?"	April 26, 2005
25	25	"Junk Funk"	January 9, 2006
26	26	"Glad Sad Bumpy Grumpy"	October 7, 2005

=== Season 2 (2006) ===
No. overall	No. in season	Title	Original release date
1	1	"A Happy Doodle Holiday"	December 16, 2006
2	2	"The Ewww Flower"	March 27, 2006
3	3	"The Mighty Moe Machine"	March 13, 2006
4	4	"The Bring-A-Sound-Arounder"	March 14, 2006
5	5	"All Aboard the Doodle Train"	March 15, 2006
6	6	"Switch-A-Doodle"	March 16, 2006
7	7	"Star Stuck"	March 17, 2006
8	8	"A Different Look"	April 24, 2006
9	9	"DeeDee Superstar"	April 10, 2006
10	10	"Best Hider Ever"	May 6, 2006
11	11	"A Mess of a Doodle"	May 22, 2006
12	12	"Step by Step"	June 5, 2006
13	13	"The Blame Game"	June 20, 2006
14	14	"Hold Your Horses"	September 11, 2006
15	15	"The Unbearable Lightness of Moe"	October 2, 2006
16	16	"Fair Share"	July 26, 2006
17	17	"Space Invader"	July 27, 2006
18	18	"Don't Use It, Don't Need It"	November 20, 2006
19	19	"Where's Mudge?"	December 4, 2006
20	20	"Moe's Lucky Clover"	March 5, 2007
21	21	"Show and Tell"	July 28, 2006
22	22	"Later Alligator"	July 25, 2006
23	23	"The Solo Surprise"	February 12, 2007
24	24	"Deedee's Big Break"	January 22, 2007
25	25	"Moon Doodles"	February 5, 2007
26	26	"Flat Sitis"	July 24, 2006

=== Season 3 (2007) ===
No. overall	No. in season	Title	Original release date
1	1	"The Name Game"	April 9, 2007
2	2	"Moe's Invention"	May 21, 2007
3	3	"Rhymes with Orange"	June 4, 2007
4	4	"Think Pink"	April 10, 2007
5	5	"Chicken and the Eggs"	April 11, 2007
6	6	"All by Myself"	April 16, 2007
7	7	"Moe's Dinosaur"	April 30, 2007
8	8	"Deedee's Accordion"	May 14, 2007
9	9	"Robo-Moe"	April 12, 2007
10	10	"Oh, Brother"	June 23, 2007
11	11	"The Frazzles"	April 13, 2007
12	12	"Way Better"	July 9, 2007
13	13	"Around the World"	November 16, 2007

== Telecast and home media ==
Beginning its televised airing run in 2005, the series premiered on the CBC in Canada in the Kids' CBC morning program schedule. Cookie Jar classified the Doodlebops as their flagship franchise, following their rebranding from the Montreal-based CINAR.

On April 1, 2005, Cookie Jar pre-sold the US broadcast rights to the series to Disney Channel, and the series would premiere on the preschool-aimed Playhouse Disney block on April 11, 2005. After its removal from Disney Channel on January 2, 2009, the series would later re-air on CBS's Cookie Jar TV block from 2011 to 2013, and on This TV's Cookie Jar Toons block around the same time. In 2016, the series aired on Starz until a few years later, but the series returned to linear US television.

In foreign countries, the series has been effectively dubbed into Irish Gaelic and is broadcast as part of the children's lunchtime package Cúla 4 on the Gaelic-language television station TG4 (including the songs).

In April 2006, the series was pre-sold to Playhouse Disney in the United Kingdom and premiered on there on the 24th day. British free-TV rights were acquired by ITV's GMTV, and in January 2007 the series was pre-sold to other Playhouse Disney networks all over the world including Australia, Italy, Latin America, among others. The series was also pre-sold to Nickelodeon Junior in France, and VRAK TV in the French-language Canada.

Between 2006 and 2007, Lionsgate Home Entertainment released four DVD volumes of the series.

As of 2022, the series is now streaming on Tubi.

== Merchandise ==
In late 2006, Cookie Jar Entertainment signed a UK licensing deal with Coolabi Productions for its properties, including the Doodlebops.

=== Toyrange ===
In November 2005, Cookie Jar announced Mattel as the worldwide toy license holder for the show.

In Late-2007, Cookie Jar appointed iToys as the UK toy partner for the series.

=== CDs ===
Walt Disney Records released several CDs featuring songs from the show in 2006 and 2007.

=== DVDs ===
In October 2005, Cookie Jar awarded the US home media rights for the series to Lionsgate Home Entertainment. Lionsgate's UK division would acquire home media rights in the United Kingdom in 2007.

== Animated spin-off ==
The Doodlebops Rockin' Road Show!
- Genre: Animated series
- Based on: Concept by Michael Hirsh and Carl Lenox
- Developed by: Jamie Waese
- Theme music composer: Carl Lenox
- Countries of origin: Canada; Germany; Argentina
- Original language: English
- No. of seasons: 1
- No. of episodes: 26

Production
- Executive producers: Michael Hirsh; Toper Taylor; Romina Crespolini; Attila Levai; Pamela Slavin
- Producers: Marlene Schmidt; Maria Laura Rodriguez; Henning Westerwelle
- Running time: 22 minutes
- Production companies: Cookie Jar Entertainment; Optix Entertainment; Illusion Studios

Original release
- Network: CBC Television (Kids' CBC)
- Release: 2010 – 2011

=== Doodlebops Rockin' Road Show! ===
In 2009, CBC greenlit a Doodlebops animated spin-off series titled Doodlebops Rockin' Road Show! for Cookie Jar. In September 2009, Cookie Jar announced they would co-produce the series with the Germany-based Optix Entertainment, and the Argentine-based Illusion Studios. In Canada, the series premiered on Kids' CBC on February 20, 2010 and CBS's Saturday morning block in the US

The series focuses on the Doodlebops going on a worldwide tour with Bus Driver Bob, Deedee Doodle's small pink dog named Bop-Bop, and a new character: Mail Snail. These were the only characters to appear in this spin-off. Lisa Lennox, Chad McNamara, Jonathan Wexler and John Catucci voiced and reprised their roles as Deedee, Rooney, Moe and Bus Driver Bob.

In each episode, Mail Snail would deliver the Doodlebops a DVD letter sent by a live action child in need of help. The child would then be turned into an animated character and sent to the bus to be a "Doodle for a Day". The series was panned by critics and fans of the original series and was cancelled in 2011 after only one season.

== Concerts ==
=== The Doodlebops: Together Forever Tour ===
A theatrically live show entitled The Doodlebops: Together Forever Tour was developed and toured Canada in early 2009. The show includes musical performances of signature favourites as well as new songs. This incorporates giant screens, original sets, and costumes. This production features a new cast of performers portraying the Doodlebops.

The show was produced by Koba Entertainment, and presented by Paquin Entertainment.

== See also ==
- The Doodlebops discography
