= Eddie Della Siepe =

Canadian comedian and actor

- Born: Edmondo Della Siepe; May 2, 1981 (age 45); Toronto, Ontario, Canada
- Notable work: Video On Trial

Comedy career
- Years active: 2001–present
- Medium: Stand-up, television, podcast
- Subjects: Everyday life, observational

Edmondo "Eddie" Della Siepe (born May 2, 1981) is an American Canadian stand-up comedian and actor. He frequently appeared on MuchMusic's hit show Video on Trial and Love Court.

== Early life ==
Eddie Della Siepe was born and raised in Toronto, Ontario. His father Antonio immigrated to Canada from Italy and his mother Elvia is from Peru. Della Siepe attended York Memorial Colligate Institute in Toronto, where he excelled in the drama program and was involved in many school productions.

In his early years he idolized Jim Carrey, and from the age of 12 he had aspirations of becoming a stand-up comedian. His first attempt at stand-up comedy was at age 17 while still attending high school, and with a lackluster experience he decided to wait until the time was right to attempt stand-up again. At age 19 he enrolled at York University in Toronto, where he majored in sociology. While attending university he decided to focus on performing stand-up comedy again, and started performing at local amateur nights and open mics.

== Career ==
=== Stand-up ===
Della Siepe is a national touring headliner and a regular in the Toronto and Los Angeles comedy scene. He has co-featured in two MuchMusic sponsored national stand-up comedy tours, the Jury Duty tour and Jury Duty 2: Even Jurier. He has also appeared at the LOL Comedy Festival in Sudbury and the Just for Laughs Festival in Montreal. He has performed at the Comedy Store and The Improv in Hollywood, California.

=== Television ===
Della Siepe has been featured in over 30 episodes of Video on Trial. In 2009 he co-starred in all 20 episodes of MuchMusic's reality dating show Love Court, hosted by Canadian recording artist Elise Estrada. In January 2010 he recorded a 30-minute "Comedy Now!" stand-up special for CTV and The Comedy Network, which aired in 2011.

=== Film ===
In 2004 Della Siepe was cast as a lead in the modern-day war drama American Soldiers by Hollywood director Sidney Furie. He was featured in two well-received independent films, Smoked and Master Plan, both official selections of the Queens Film Festival in New York, the Los Angeles Film Festival, and New York Film & Video Festival.

== Filmography ==
Film
Year	Title	Role	Notes
2005	American Soldiers	PFC Roy Pena	
2005	Master Plan	Johnny	Short film
2005	Smoked	Spike	
2008	The Four Horsemen		
2014	Delivery	Himself	Documentary

Television
Year	Title	Role	Notes
2006–2013	Video on Trial	Himself	
2008	Love Court	Himself	Jury member
2011	Comedy Now!	Himself	Comedy special
2011	Great Canadian Laugh Off	Himself	Season 6 episode 1
2012–2013	Match Game	Himself	Panelist; 6 episodes
2014	Just for Laughs: All-Access	Himself	Season 2 episode 7
2014	Warehouse 13	Patron #1	Season 5 episode 3: "A Faire to Remember"
2014	Space Riders: Division Earth	Cafe Jerk	Season 1 episodes 5 and 6: "New Lives, New Rules" and "The Lone Rider"

== Discography ==
- I Think I've Changed (2015)
- little jerk (2020)
- I'll be fine (2023)
