= Aba Amuquandoh =

Canadian actress (born 1990s)

Aba Amuquandoh (born 1994 or 1996, 29 or 31 years old) is a Canadian actress and comedian, best known for her work on the CBC sketch comedy series This Hour Has 22 Minutes. She first joined the show in the 2020 season, both as a writer and as a supporting performer in sketches, and was promoted to a starring member in the 2021–22 season.

From Toronto, Ontario, she has previously been associated with The Sketchersons and with The Second City's FamCo troupe for kids and family shows. She is also a partner with Coko Galore, PHATT Al, Alan Shane Lewis, Nkasi Ogbonnah, Ajahnis Charley, Brandon Ash-Mohammed and Brandon Hackett in Untitled Black Sketch Project, Canada's first all-black sketch comedy troupe.

In 2020, Amuquandoh performed on FreeUp! The Emancipation Day Special. Beginning in 2022, she has also been the host of the reality competition series Best in Miniature.
