= American Soldiers =

- Directed by: Sidney J. Furie
- Starring: Curtis Morgan
- Music by: Varouje
- Release date: 2005
- Running time: 103 min.
- Country: Canada
- Language: English

American Soldiers is a 2005 war film directed by Sidney J. Furie.

== Premise ==
Iraq, 2004: during a routine sortie a US patrol is ambushed and the young soldiers are forced to put their training and skills into action fast. A determined foe with superior local knowledge, the Fedayeen insurgents soon draw them into close quarter combat and a desperate fight for survival.

== Cast ==
- Curtis Morgan as Spc. Tyler Jackson
- Zan Calabretta as Sgt. Delvecchio
- Jordan Brown as Spc. Cohen
- Eddie Della Siepe as Pfc. Roy Pena
- Paul Sturino as Pfc. Dowdy
- Ben Gilbank as Pfc. Aikens
- Shaun Taylor as Sgt. Ron Stalker (as Shaun Garrett)
- Brett Ryan as Spc. Romeo
- Philippe Buckland as Spc. Deke Carver
- Michael Belisaro as Pfc. Johnson (as Michael Belisario)
- Vince Salonia as Lt. Ahmed
- James Gilbert as National Guard Lt. Banning (as Jim Gilbert)
- Jason Matheson as National Guard Lt. Diggs
- Alastair Love as National Guard Sgt. Wilkes
- Josh Campbell as National Guard Pfc. Kelly
- Jesse Ryder Hughes as National Guard Spc. Cooper (as Jesse Hughes)
- Danny Kharazmi as Insurgent
- Rashid Al Switi as Bad Cop (as Rashid Al-Switti)
- Omar Balika as Fedayeen Leader
- Mohamed Safi as Doctor #1
- Michael Challenor as Doctor #2
- Sergio de la Rocha as CIA Contractor
- Kevin Jake Walker as Aide
- Andrea Drepaul as Station Nurse
- Saeideh Mohajer as Nurse #2
- Rachael Ancheril as Nurse #3 (as Rachel Ancheril)
