= Stars on Trial =

- Starring: Ron Sparks; Tim McAuliffe; Trevor Boris; Debra DiGiovanni; Sabrina Jalees; Jemeni; David Kerr; Fraser Young
- Country of origin: Canada
- No. of episodes: 8

Production
- Producer: Trevor Boris
- Running time: 60 Minutes

Original release
- Network: MuchMusic
- Release: December 2005 – present

Stars on Trial is a MuchMusic television special based on the MuchMusic television program Video on Trial. It premiered in late December 2005, as part of the network's annual "Holiday Wrap." Stars on Trial uses basically the same concept as Video on Trial. However, the special was a full hour long as opposed to being a half-hour long and took place in an actual courtroom set instead of a black background set. Also, the jury analyzed celebrities themselves instead of just music videos.

The show was MuchMusic's highest rated special of the year other than the MuchMusic Video Awards and remains the highest rated comedy special in the network's history (not including VOT Holiday specials which are holiday-themed regular episodes).

== Cast ==
- Ron Sparks as The Judge
- Tim McAuliffe as Rusty Waters (The Bailiff)

=== Jurors ===
- Trevor Boris
- Debra DiGiovanni
- Sabrina Jalees
- Jemeni
- David Kerr
- Fraser Young

== Verdicts ==
As in Video on Trial, these verdicts are of a humorous nature.

| Accused | Verdict |
| Ashlee and Jessica Simpson | Sentenced to make a duet that will not make your ears bleed. |
| Britney Spears | Sentenced to spray her house free of Federlines. |
| 50 Cent | Sentenced to "fiddy" years in prison. |
| Lindsay Lohan | Sentenced to increase the size of her boobs. |
| Brangelina (Brad Pitt and Angelina Jolie) | Sentenced to adopt each other. |
| Mariah Carey | Sentenced to continue production of her line of signature straitjackets. |
| Kanye West | Sentenced to cease construction on his Kanye West shaped swimming pool. |
| Paris Hilton | Sentenced to make another sex tape called "Boring Sex Part 2." |
