= The Doodlebops discography =

This article lists the CDs and DVDs of The Doodlebops, a Canadian children's musical fantasy comedy television series. "Rock & Bop with The Doodlebops", (Disney Records USA), was released in 2006. Other CDs and DVDs were released later.

== CDs ==
=== Get On The Bus (2007) ===
This was known as "Superstars" in Canada; it was a JUNO Nominee for 2008 that lost to "Music Soup" by Jen Gould.

1. "Tick Tock"
2. "I Can Dance"
3. "She's A Superstar"
4. "You're The Best"
5. "Hold Your Horses"
6. "More Fun"
7. "It's Up To You"
8. "Different Things"
9. "Get On Board"
10. "Jump Up"
11. "When You're Good at Something"
12. "You Betcha"
13. "My Hero"
14. "My Ukulele"
15. "Let's Get Loud"
16. "What You've Got"
17. "Your Favorite Color"
18. "You Are My Friend"
19. "Who Can It Be"
20. "Rockin' the World"
21. "Get On The Bus II"

=== Rock & Bop with The Doodlebops (2006) ===
1. "We're The Doodlebops"
2. "The Pledge"
3. "Wobbly Whoopsy"
4. "Look in a Book"
5. "I Want to Be Bigger"
6. "Get On The Bus"
7. "Hey Moe"
8. "The Bird Song"
9. "Count to Ten"
10. "Queen for a Day"
11. "Getting Along"
12. "Gibble Gobble"
13. "My Friend"
14. "Write A Letter"
15. "Tap Tap Tap"
16. "Faces"
17. "When the Lights Go Out"
18. "Cauliflower"
19. "Keep Trying"
20. "Together Forever"
21. "Thank You"

Playhouse Disney: Imagine & Learn With Music features two Doodlebop songs; "Wobbly Whoopsy" & "Together Forever".

== DVDs ==
=== Music and Fun (Vol. 1) ===
1. Tap Tap Tap
2. Queen For a day Deedee
3. High and Low
- Bonus features: Musical instruments flash cards, "We're the Doodlebops" music video
- Includes a CD with:
  1. We're the Doodlebops
  2. The Pledge
  3. Get on the Bus
  4. High and Low
  5. Tap Tap Tap
  6. Queen For a Deedee

=== Let's Move! (Vol. 2) ===
1. Wobbly Whoopsy
2. The Move Groove
3. Jumpin' Judy
- Bonus features: "Wobbly Whoopsy" music video, 2 Bus dance scenes
- Includes a CD with:
  1. We're the Doodlebops
  2. The Pledge
  3. Get on the Bus
  4. Wobbly Whoopsy
  5. Jumpin' Judy
  6. On The Move

=== Let's Have Some Fun! (Vol. 3) ===
1. Gibble Gobble Nabber Gabber
2. Cauliflower Power
3. Junk Funk
4. Roar Like A Dinosaur (Bonus Episode)
- Bonus feature: Knock knock jokes

=== Abracadeedee It's Magic (Vol. 4) ===
1. Glad Sad Bumpy Grumpy
2. Fast And Slow Moe
3. Abracadeedee
4. What Did You See Today? (Bonus Episode)
- Bonus feature: "Abracadeedee" music video

=== Twist, Turn, Dance and Learn (Vol. 5) ===
1. Look In a Book
2. What When Why
3. Strudel Doodle
4. All Together Now (Bonus Episode)
- Bonus feature: "All Together Now" music video

=== Rock And Bop with the Doodlebops (Released: August 1, 2006) ===
1. All Together Now
2. High and Low
3. What Did You See Today?
4. Junk Funk
- Bonus features
  1. "We're the Doodlebops" music video
  2. "Wobbly Whoopsy" music video
  3. "Abracadeedee" music video
  4. 4 Sing-alongs
  5. 4 Knock knock jokes

=== Dance & Hop with the Doodlebops (Released: August 1, 2006) ===
1. Tap Tap Tap
2. Jumpin' Judy
3. The Move Groove
4. Wobbly Whoopsy
- Bonus features
  1. "We're the Doodlebops" music video
  2. "Wobbly Whoopsy" music video
  3. "Abracadeedee" music video
  4. 4 Sing-alongs
  5. Knock knock jokes

=== Superstars (Released: Jan 23, 2007 ) ===
1. Doodlebops Photo Op
2. Count On Me
3. Cauliflower Power
4. What, When, Why?

=== Get Up & Groove (Releases April 24, 2007) ===
1. Fast And Slow Moe
2. Step By Step
3. Flat Sitis
4. The Bad Day
