= Josh Saltzman =

Canadian comedian, writer and director

Josh Saltzman is a Canadian Comedy Award-winning comedian, writer and director from Toronto, Ontario who currently resides in Los Angeles. He was the head writer of DHX Media's 2015 Inspector Gadget series produced for Teletoon in Canada (seen on Netflix in the United States), and has written for many television shows, including HBO Canada's Call Me Fitz, Disney XD's Fangbone!, CBC's This Hour Has 22 Minutes and many others. Saltzman won the 2010 Canadian Comedy Award for best web clip for his video "That Thing That Happened", which he co-wrote, co-directed and starred in with Lindsay Ames. He is also the winner of the 2008 Tim Sims Encouragement Award for "7 Minutes in Heaven". He was a member of the Canadian Comedy Award-winning sketch troupe The Sketchersons from 2009 to 2010. He has appeared on the Comedy Network on the show Upload Yours, in which he had an entire episode devoted to his online videos.
