= John Catucci =

Canadian actor and comedian

- Catucci as Bus Driver Bob, performing with The Doodlebops at a Doodlebops Live! concert on February 29, 2008.
- Born: July 11, 1973 (age 53); Toronto, Ontario, Canada
- Education: York University
- Occupations: TV host, actor, singer, sketch comedian
- Awards: Canada Comedy Award: 2006 – Pretty Funny Taped Live Performance; 2004 – Best Sketch Troupe; 2003 – Best Sketch Troupe

John Catucci (/kəˈtuːtʃi/ kə-TOO-chee, Italian: [kaˈtuttʃi]; born July 11, 1973) is a Canadian sketch comedian, singer, actor, and TV host.

== Early life ==
Catucci was born in Toronto, Ontario, and is of Italian descent.

== Career ==
He was the host of the Food Network Canada series You Gotta Eat Here! The series won two Canadian Screen Awards, for Best Lifestyle or Talk Program or Series and Best Direction in a Lifestyle/Practical Information Program or Series, at the 2nd Canadian Screen Awards in 2014. It also garnered nominations at the 3rd Canadian Screen Awards in 2015 for Best Lifestyle or Talk Program or Series and Best Direction in a Lifestyle/Practical Information Program or Series.

Catucci is also a member of The Minnesota Wrecking Crew and the musical comedy duo The Doo Wops with David Mesiano, and has won three Canadian Comedy Awards with additional nominations for his work with those groups. Catucci attended York University. He has also appeared on MuchMusic's Video On Trial and in the movie The Tuxedo. He also appeared as Bus Driver Bob on The Doodlebops.

In May 2019, Catucci began producing and hosting the Food Network series Big Food Bucket List.

== Filmography ==
=== Television ===
| Year | Title | Role | Notes |
|---|---|---|---|
| 2005–2007 | The Doodlebops | Bus Driver Bob | 65 episodes |
