= Robyn Dell'Unto =

Singer, songwriter and producer from Toronto, Ontario

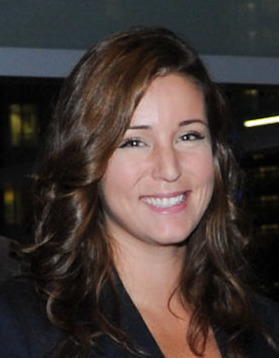
- Occupation(s): singer, songwriter and music producer

Robyn Dell'Unto is a singer, songwriter and producer from Toronto, Ontario.

== Career ==
Dell'Unto's debut album I'm Here Every Night was released in 2010 on inDiscover/Orange Record Label. Her song Ghost was featured in the Season 2 Finale of CBC's hit show Being Erica. Single Just A Bird charted in the Top 10 on South Africa's Algoa FM for 30 weeks.

Dell'Unto's sophomore album Little Lines was her first release as producer/co-producer. She now writes and produces for other artists.

She received a nomination for Best Emerging Artist at the 2014 Canadian Folk Music Awards.

== Other work ==
Dell'Unto runs A Song Of My Own, a songwriting and music production workshop series for girls.

== Discography ==
I'm Here Every Night (2010)
Little Lines (2014)
Beaconsfield (2017)

== Singles ==
Call Me (2016)
