= Brandon Ash-Mohammed =

Canadian stand-up comedian

Brandon Ash-Mohammed is a Canadian stand-up comedian, whose debut comedy album Capricornication was released in 2020.

A Black Canadian of Trinidadian heritage, he is an alumnus of the comedy school at Humber College. He has some Arabic ancestry, but was not raised Muslim; one of his comedy pieces on Capricorniation centres on the assumptions that people sometimes make about his identity because of his surname.

Openly gay, he was the creator of Toronto's popular Ethnic Rainbow series of comedy nights for queer BIPOC comedians, and the host of Pride Toronto's televised "Virtual Pride" special during the COVID-19 pandemic in Canada in 2020. He was featured in The Comedy Network's 2018 Homegrown Comics special, and has been a writer for the sketch comedy series TallBoyz. He is also a partner with Coko Galore, PHATT Al, Alan Shane Lewis, Nkasi Ogbonnah, Ajahnis Charley, Aba Amuquandoh and Brandon Hackett in Untitled Black Sketch Project, Canada's first all-Black Canadian sketch comedy troupe. He is presently the Toronto correspondent on the 29th season of This Hour Has 22 Minutes.

In 2022, he appeared in LOL: Last One Laughing Canada, and won the Canadian Screen Award for Best Writing in a Lifestyle or Reality/Competition Series at the 10th Canadian Screen Awards for the Canada's Drag Race episode "Screech".

In 2025, Ash-Mohammed was cast as Shawn in the Crave sports romance drama series Heated Rivalry.
