= Brandon Hackett =

Canadian comedian

Brandon Hackett is a Canadian sketch comedian, writer and actor. He is most noted as a three-time Canadian Screen Award nominee for Best Writing in a Variety or Sketch Comedy Program or Series, receiving two nods at the 8th Canadian Screen Awards in 2020 as part of the writing team for The Beaverton, and one at the 9th Canadian Screen Awards in 2021 as part of the writing team for This Hour Has 22 Minutes.

He began his career as an improv comedian, appearing with the Toronto company of The Second City in shows such as Unwrapped, Come What Mayhem!, Everything Is Great Again and The Best Is Yet to Come Undone.

He was later a partner with Jonathan Langdon in the sketch comedy duo Hackett & Langdon, and with Coko Galore, PHATT Al, Alan Shane Lewis, Nkasi Ogbonnah, Brandon Ash-Mohammed, Aba Amuquandoh and Ajahnis Charley in Untitled Black Sketch Project, Canada's first all-Black Canadian sketch comedy troupe.

He has also been a writer for the television series TallBoyz, The Parker Andersons/Amelia Parker, Overlord and the Underwoods, Doomlands, Run the Burbs, The Next Step, Shelved and Popularity Papers, and has had acting roles in Diamond Tongues, The Amazing Gayl Pile, Gary and His Demons, Baroness von Sketch Show, Detention Adventure, Odd Squad and Pinecone & Pony.

He identifies as queer.
