= Debra DiGiovanni =

Canadian comedian

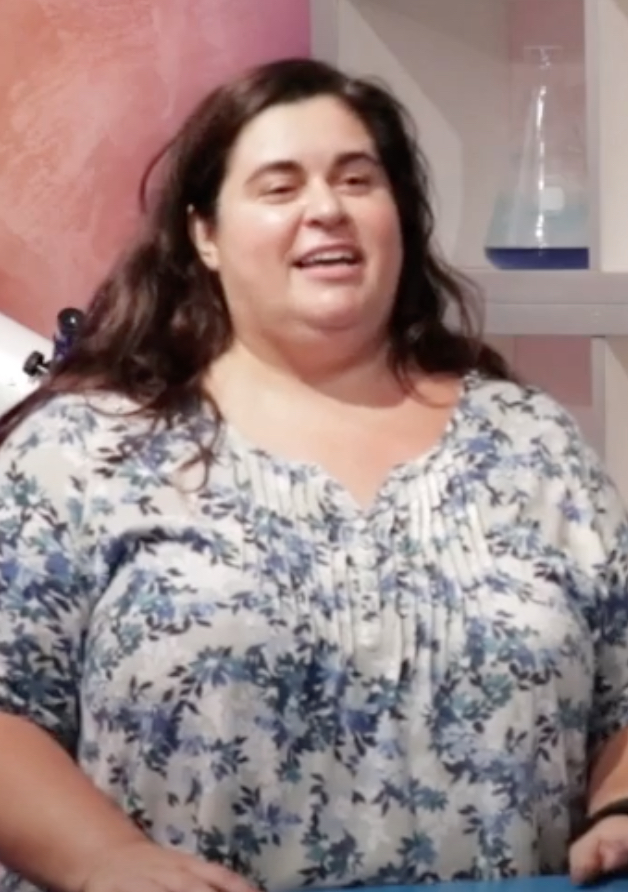
- DiGiovanni in 2018
- Born: March 21, 1972 (age 54); Pointe-Claire, Quebec, Canada
- Occupations: Actress, Comedian
- Years active: 1999-present

Debra DiGiovanni (born March 21, 1972) is a Canadian stand-up comedian originally from Tillsonburg, Ontario.

She is a frequent guest on the CBC Radio program The Debaters, for which she earned a Canadian Comedy Award nomination for writing. Her previous work includes being a regular contributor to Much’s Video on Trial series and its spinoff Stars on Trial, as well as a permanent panellist on The Comedy Network’s Canadian revival of Match Game, among other things.

== Personal life ==
Debra DiGiovanni was born in Pointe-Claire, Quebec, on March 21, 1972. She is of Italian descent, was raised in a big Italian family, and has a fraternal twin sister. She grew up in Tillsonburg, Ontario.

DiGiovanni began her studies in university pursuing fashion design, though she admits it was not a fit for her.

== Career ==
DiGiovanni's comedy career began at the age of 27 with the help of Humber College's inaugural year of their Comedy Writing and Performance course in 1999. Three months into enrolling in the program, she was on stage for the first time. She credits Carol Burnett and Laverne & Shirley (starring Penny Marshall and Cindy Williams) as some of her inspirations. "I watched these women be funny and secretly wanted to do that myself."

In 2002, she won the Canadian Comedy Award for the Best Stand-up Newcomer in Stand Up. In 2003, NOW Magazine named her headline show as the 3rd Best of the Year. In 2005, she made her first appearance at the Just for Laughs Festival where she was invited on a cross-Canada tour opening for Russell Peters. In 2007, 2009, and 2011, she won the Canadian Comedy Award for Best Female Stand Up.

She was previously a contributor on the popular Much show Video on Trial and its spinoff Stars on Trial.

In 2007, she appeared in the fifth season of Last Comic Standing. By winning an audition in Montreal, she was selected to participate in a semifinal qualifying round in Hollywood, making it to the top 10 finalist. She participated in the show until she was eliminated and placed 8th.

Also that year, she hosted the Canadian New Media Awards and the Canadian Comedy Awards. In July 2008, she appeared on eTalk, interviewing contestants on the sixth season of Canadian Idol. She also hosted the Genie Awards alongside Sandra Oh, as well as one night of the Gemini Awards in 2008.

From 2010, she was a permanent panelist on The Comedy Network’s Canadian revival of Match Game.

On February 27, 2018, she performed on Conan.

In 2019, her comedy album Lady Jazz received a Juno Award nomination for Comedy Album of the Year at the Juno Awards of 2019.

In 2022, she was a contestant on LOL: Last One Laughing Canada.

In 2025, she performed on The Tonight Show hosted by Jimmy Fallon, and later in the year received the award for the Best Comedy Album of the Year at the Juno Awards of 2025.

She is presently a frequent guest on the CBC Radio program The Debaters, for which she earned a Canadian Comedy Award nomination for writing.

== Filmography ==
=== Television ===
Year	Title	Role	Notes
2003	The Toronto Show	Deb the Receptionist	
2005–2013	Video on Trial	Herself - Panelist	
2005	Comedy Now!	Herself	Season 12, Episode 1: "Debra DiGiovanni"
2005	Stars on Trial	Herself - Juror #2	
2006	Headlines on Trial	Herself	
2006	The Jane Show	Fourth Floor Staffer #1	
2009	Live at Gotham	Herself - Comedian	
2009	Just for Laughs	Herself	
2009	Jimmy Two-Shoes	Princess Weavil (voice)	
2007	Last Comic Standing	Herself - Contestant	
2009–2014	The Ha!ifax Comedy Fest	Herself - Comedian	7 episodes
2010	The Latest Buzz	Female Judge on Make Me an Icon	
2010	Jay's Movie Is a Piece of Shit	Debra Pisani	
2010	Winnipeg Comedy Festival	Herself	S8 E1: "The Deadly Seven"
2011	The Queen's Toast: A Royal Wedding Special	Herself	
2011	The Debaters (TV series)	Herself	S1 E1: "Golden Years & Shower vs Bath"
2011	Goodbye Sara Hennessey	Debra	
2011	Unlucky	Jeanette	
2011–2012	The Hour	Herself - Panelist	
2012	StandUp in Stilettos	Herself	
2012	Match Game	Herself – Panelist	
2013	Gotham Comedy Live	Herself – Comedian	
2013	Straight Man	Quaraline	
2013–2014	Cute Boy of the Week	Herself – Co-host	
2014	Sleepover with Dan & Lauren	Herself	
2014	Sasquatch Sketch Comedy		
2014–2015	Just for Laughs: All-Access	Herself	
2015	Mr. D	Tiffany Callaghan	
2016	The Bachelorette Canada After Show	Herself - Guest	
2018	Back to School Just for Laughs	Herself - Comedian	
2018	Sex Life (short)	Dina	
2018–2019	Corporate	Antonia	
2019	Comedy Central Stand-Up Featuring	Herself – Comedian	
2019	Brotherly	Barbara	
2019	Stumptown	Waitress	
2020	Canada Day 2020 at Your House	Herself	
2021	Humour Resources	Herself	
2021	Unprotected Sets	Herself	
2021	Birdgirl		
2021	Howie Mandel & Friends: Don't Sneeze on Me	Herself	
2022	LOL: Last One Laughing Canada	Herself - Contestant	
2022	WeHost with Zach & Darren	Herself	

=== Comedy specials ===
Year	Title	Distributor
2011	Debra Digiovanni: Single, Awkward, Female	Comedy Dynamics
2018	Debra DiGiovanni: Here's the Thing	CraveTV with Just for Laughs

== Awards ==
- 2001: Nominated for Cream of Comedy award
- 2002: Canadian Comedy Award for the Best Stand-up Newcomer in Stand Up.
- 2003: NOW Magazine named her headline show as the 3rd Best of the Year.
- 2005: Nominated in the Canadian Comedy Awards
- 2007, 2009, & 2011: Canadian Comedy Award for Best Female Stand Up.
- 2009: Gemini Award for best individual comedy performance
- 2019: Her comedy album Lady Jazz received a Juno Award nomination for Comedy Album of the Year at the Juno Awards of 2019.
- 2025: Winner of the Comedy Album of the Year at the Juno Awards of 2025 for her album Honourable Intentions.
