= Julia Hladkowicz =

Canadian stand-up comedian

Julia Hladkowicz is a Canadian stand-up comedian from Ottawa, Ontario, most noted as a finalist in the 2011 edition of SiriusXM Canada's Canada's Top Comic competition.

She received a Canadian Comedy Award nomination for Best Female Stand-Up at the 16th Canadian Comedy Awards in 2015.

She is married to fellow comedian Matt O'Brien. In 2025, O'Brien and Hladkowicz roasted each other in a Season 5 episode of Roast Battle Canada, and auditioned back to back for the 20th season of America's Got Talent.
