= Comedy Bar (Toronto) =

Comedy club in Toronto, Ontario, Canada

Comedy Bar is a comedy club in Toronto, Ontario. The club currently operates two distinct locations, at Bloor and Concord in the Dovercourt Park neighbourhood and at Danforth and Dawes in the Upper Beaches.

The original Bloor Street location was launched in 2008 by Gary Rideout Jr. and James Elksnitis as a permanent venue for Rideout's sketch comedy troupe The Sketchersons, with Roger Abbott and Don Ferguson of the sketch comedy troupe Royal Canadian Air Farce as supporting investors. The club regularly features both sketch and stand-up performances, booking both emerging local comedians and major national and international touring comics. The Bloor location also features a smaller second "cabaret" room to highlight more experimental and alternative comedy.

In 2011, the owners and the Sketchersons launched the short-format television series Comedy Bar, a mockumentary series about fictionalized goings-on at the bar, for Bite TV.

The Danforth location was opened in 2022.

In 2025 the establishment launched CBMax, a YouTube channel devoted to broadcasting stand-up comedy specials and other original comedy programming.
