= Ajahnis Charley =

Canadian comedian and actor

Ajahnis Charley is a Canadian sketch and stand-up comedian and actor. They are most noted for their work as part of the writing team for This Hour Has 22 Minutes, who collectively won the Canadian Screen Award for Best Writing in a Variety or Sketch Comedy Program or Series at the 12th Canadian Screen Awards in 2024.

In 2020 Charley made the short film I Am Gay, about their experiences coming out as LGBTQ to their family, for the National Film Board of Canada short film series The Curve. They became more widely known as a partner with Coko Galore, PHATT Al, Alan Shane Lewis, Nkasi Ogbonnah, Brandon Ash-Mohammed, Aba Amuquandoh and Brandon Hackett in Untitled Black Sketch Project, Canada's first all-Black Canadian sketch comedy troupe.

In 2022 they were featured in an episode of the CBC Gem stand-up comedy series The New Wave of Standup.

They have also had acting roles in the television miniseries Station Eleven, the web series Topline and Tokens, the sitcom Shelved and the feature film Suze.

== Personal life ==
Charley is non-binary.
