= Stars Gone Wild =

- Starring: Various Judges
- Country of origin: Canada

Production
- Running time: 30 minutes

Original release
- Network: MuchMusic

Stars Gone Wild was a mockumentary series created by Adam Halpern on MuchMusic that critiques the lifestyle of modern celebrities. The title of the show is a parody of the Girls Gone Wild series. It is based on the special Overrated in 06. After one season and 28 episodes the show was cancelled due to poor ratings and negative audience reaction. Speculation that the show would be cancelled occurred after the show did not return in September 2008, and the cancellation was confirmed when a replacement show (We're Experiencing Technical Difficulties) began to air. The show premiered well as a Video on Trial spinoff, but the ratings continued falling with many viewers voicing their displeasure with the show on the MuchMusic website forums.
