= Andrew Johnston (comedian) =

Andrew Johnston is a Canadian comedian and writer, most noted for his work on the television series Video on Trial and Roast Battle Canada.

Originally from Brockville, Ontario, he attended Queen's University in Kingston, where he was a president and executive producer of the Queen's Players. After winning the Toronto regionals of The Great Canadian Laugh-Off in 2005, he was nominated for the 2006 Tim Sims Encouragement Fund Award. He received a Canadian Comedy Award nomination for Best Stand-Up Newcomer at the 10th Canadian Comedy Awards in 2009.

He began appearing on Video on Trial in the same era, and later appeared on the comedy panel show Too Much Information after the cancellation of Video on Trial.

Apart from his television appearances he has frequently toured on the Canadian comedy circuit, appearing frequently but not exclusively at LGBTQ-themed shows and events. He was the organizer of Bitch Salad, a regular LGBTQ comedy showcase at Buddies in Bad Times. He has also released several comedy albums, including White Devil (2015), *Sips Tea* (2018), A Special Place in Hell (2022) and Pomp & Circumcised (2024).

He appeared in two episodes of Roast Battle Canada season 2, against comedians Tyler Morrison and Cassie Cao. He was also part of the show's writing team, and received a Canadian Screen Award nomination for Best Writing in a Variety or Sketch Comedy Series, alongside George Reinblatt, Aisha Brown, Jeff Rothpan and Rob Michaels, at the 11th Canadian Screen Awards in 2023.
