= Video on Trial =

Canadian television series

- The opening title card starting in season 9
- Starring: Aisha Alfa, Paul Lemieux
- Country of origin: Canada
- No. of episodes: 250 (list of episodes)

Production
- Producers: Various (see section)
- Running time: 30 minutes
- Production companies: CHUM Limited; CTV Globemedia

Original release
- Network: MuchMusic
- Release: August 15, 2005 – July 6, 2014

Video on Trial is a Canadian comedy television program that airs on Canadian television network MuchMusic. The show consists of a panel of musicians, comedians, and entertainment columnists critiquing five different music videos in a courtroom-esque manner. The panel acts as the jurors, poking fun at and questioning each artist's behaviour in each video. Artists' personal lives and off-set behaviour are usually mocked by the critics in relation to the music video. They are shown in separate clips to use their opinions.

Since its debut on August 15, 2005, the show has become one of the most highly rated and successful shows on MuchMusic, attracting a dedicated cult following and has garnered a Gemini Award nomination. The show also experienced a brief run on American television, airing on television network Fuse TV from October 2011 to early 2012 before being replaced by another series, Special Videos Unit: Video on Trial, based upon the same premise as the original Canadian Video on Trial.

At the start of the ninth season, the show's format was overhauled to feature recurring sketches and segments. The panel was replaced by Aisha Alfa and Paul Lemieux. Only four episodes into the revamp, which was not well received, the show was cancelled as part of significant cutbacks at Bell Media on July 11, 2014.

== Production ==
=== Videos ===
The show's producers usually pick the videos featured on the show. However, they are still required to get clearance from the copyright holders of the video to get the video featured on the show. Only after clearance is given can the video be featured on the show. An episode usually features videos recent at the time of the episode's airing, with at least one of the five videos per episode still being in rotation. Some non-themed episodes feature older videos, though, mostly those from the early 2000s, and popular videos from 1997 to 1999 have been played on rare occasions.

=== Writing and shooting ===
The jurors' jokes serve as the majority of the show's content. These jokes are written by themselves. According to an interview with series regular Trevor Boris, the jurors receive copies of the videos for the episode, and are given a period of time to write jokes and prepare for the shooting of the episode.

On her MySpace blog, juror Sabrina Jalees described the size of the room where the show is in as "the size of a large coffin", and that a laptop with a DVD of the videos is placed in front of the juror as a guide. The five "jurors" usually shoot their scenes separately. However, the show gives the impression that all five jurors shoot the scenes together, with jurors often shown engaging in interactive behavior with each other.

=== Format ===
Video on Trial features five music videos being critiqued in a courtroom-esque manner; the above image shows the opening segment of each episode that introduces the five videos, seen with the different visuals the series has used throughout the two formats it has undergone.

The show's basic format involves a narrator starting the show by announcing its name, and introducing the five videos set to be "tried", referred to as "cases", as well as the jurors of the episode. Following this introductory sequence, the actual "trials" of the videos begin.

Videos are critiqued, or "tried" separately and consecutively by "case number". A short intermission separates the trials of each video; the show cuts to a commercial break after two videos' trials have been aired.

Each video is critiqued for around 3–4 minutes. Most of the videos featured on the show are generally given bad reviews, though this is to add to the comedic nature of the show. A video's trial ends with selected jurors from the episode giving his/her own verdict to the video's artist, though verdicts are occasionally given to a selected element of a video, such as a person featured in the video.

==== History ====
Elements of the show were introduced, altered, and discontinued throughout its run.

In the format used at the start of the show's run, the jurors' occupations were given, though sometimes fictional. Graphics for this format included CRT televisions and film reels. This format also included opening voiceovers, written by Tim McAuliffe and Ron Sparks, these explained what the video was "accused for", and information for "the jury" to know) and "final verdicts" given to the artists of each video, of relating to them in real-life or their behavior in the video. The nineteenth episode of the third season retained this basic format, but introduced new visuals, giving its graphics a more modern look; for example, at the start of each episode, videos were introduced on flat-screen televisions instead of CRT televisions. This basic format was used until the twenty-first episode of the show's fifth season.

With a re-run of the fifth season's twenty-first episode, the show underwent a major alteration of its format. The verdicts and opening voiceovers previously given to each video were discontinued. Graphics and visuals were once again modernized, to give them a more futuristic feel. The nineteenth episode of the show's seventh season altered the show's graphics and visuals, giving them a more colourful feel, while retaining the show's second format.

At the start of the ninth season, the series was completely revamped. In addition to the jurors' being replaced by Aisha Alfa and Paul Lemieux, Season 9 uses a new format featuring recurring sketches and segments.

=== Special episodes ===
Special themed episodes have also been produced, usually focusing on a specific theme such as a particular decade, one-hit wonders, teen pop, music videos set on beaches, songs by Canadian musicians, and Christmas music ("Holiday Crap"). For example, there have been a series of "Totally '80s" and "So '90s" episodes where songs from those decades are featured.

The first Video on Trial special was a MuchMusic "Holiday Wrap" courtroom episode called Stars on Trial, which starred Sparks as "The Judge" and McAuliffe as "Rusty the Bailiff." Six regular jurors sat together as a jury and artists were put on trial in general, not for particular songs as is normally done on the regular VOT show.

In a similar manner to Fromage, a previous holiday special on the network, a special one-hour-long episode aired during December 2008 as part of MuchMusic's "Holiday Wrap" year-end programming, counting down the top 20 "worst" videos of the year. The special has returned for every year since then. In the 100th episode, it was revealed that the working title for the show in its early development stages was "Anatomy of a Video."

== Cast ==
=== Producers ===
The show has seen various producers throughout its run.

- Alex Sopinka – senior producer (2005–2006)
- Jason Ford – supervising producer (2005–2011)
- Ken Katigbak – producer (2006)
- Josh Tizel – producer (2006)
- John Kampilis – producer (2006)
- Mark Myers – producer (2006)
- Chris Greidanus - line producer (2006)
- Colin McRae – line producer (2006)
- Kerry Cunningham – producer (2006–2008)
- Steve Jarman – producer (2006–2008)
- Trevor Boris – producer (2007–2009)
- Cary Smith – producer (2009–2010)
- Katya Diakow – producer (2010–present)
- Adam Halpern – producer (2009–present)

=== Jurors ===
The panel of jurors critiquing the videos are randomly selected for each episode; the panel regularly consists of Canadian stand-up comedians. Although some jurors make regular appearances, by contrast, some judges have made just one appearance. Examples of jurors who have made multiple appearances on the show include Marty Adams, Nicole Arbour, Sabrina Jalees, Hunter Collins, Eddie Della Siepe, Trixx, Jemeni, Boomer Phillips, Laurie Elliott, Ron Sparks, Dini Dimakos, Sara Hennessey, Katherine Ryan, Darrin Rose, Andrew Johnston, David Kerr, Debra DiGiovanni, and Trevor Boris; the latter two have been jurors the most times on the show, both appearing in more than 50 episodes of the show.

In some occasions, celebrities in professions as diverse as music, sports, modeling, and acting have appeared on the show, such as "Weird Al" Yankovic, Kardinal Offishall, Jimmy Pop and Jared Hasselhoff of the Bloodhound Gang, Perez Hilton, Russell Peters, Chris Jericho, Pauly Shore, and Jesse Jane. On one occasion, Josh Ramsay of Canadian rock band Marianas Trench appeared as a juror for his own band's video for "Shake Tramp".

=== Artists featured ===
The artists whose videos are critiqued on the show range from diverse genres, such as hip hop, rock, and electronic, but generally videos that have been aired by MuchMusic.

Many artists have had multiple videos of theirs critiqued; for example, 14 videos by American singer Madonna were critiqued on the show; one of them was critiqued on 3 occasions. An entire episode was also dedicated to critiquing her music videos. Other artists critiqued multiple times include Lady Gaga, Rihanna, Justin Timberlake, Mindless Behavior, Britney Spears, Gwen Stefani, Blink-182, The Killers, Beyoncé, Pink, Christina Aguilera, and My Chemical Romance. From his first appearance on the show, Ron Sparks frequently made jokes about Shawn Desman and deadpanned "Shawn Desman sucks", even in episodes in which no Desman video appeared. 50 Cent reappeared often enough that Trevor Boris jokingly gave him a mock "Lifetime of Sucking Award", and during Nicki Minaj's video for "Va Va Voom", Boris joked that she appeared more times on the show than he did himself, which he did not really like. DiGiovanni frequently swooned over certain male artists.

== Reception, legacy and achievements ==
=== Success and cross into American television ===
Debuting quietly in 2005 on Canadian music television network MuchMusic, the show slowly rose to fame, eventually becoming one of the network's highest-rated shows. For the show's first six seasons (and for a few episodes of its seventh season), its broadcast on television was limited to Canada. However, in 2011, American music television Fuse TV successfully obtained rights to air the show.

Fuse started airing Video on Trial on October 20, 2011, marking the formal television debut of the show in the United States, as well as the debut of the show anywhere outside of its home country, Canada. The show's American debut started with episodes from the late fifth season of the show. However, in early 2012 Fuse ceased to air episodes of Video on Trial, opting to instead form a new series based on the show's premise. The outcome of this decision, the similarly titled Special Videos Unit: Video on Trial, premiered on March 9, 2012.

=== Criticism ===
There have also been guests who complained about the show's compensation and/or production. Juror Hugh Phukovsky pulled all Video on Trial listings from his Myspace page, claiming on his Myspace blog that "[he] gave those fuckers some GOLD!" and that "[they] cut it all out with "humourless editing".

On a Kelevision radio broadcast, guests Aaron Berg, Darren Frost and Boomer Phillips discussed the show and its shortcomings (the latter two had appeared as jurors on the show). Frost was especially upset about the show, particularly the small fees that comedian guests were paid; he has never appeared on the show again to date.

Juror Ron Sparks once joked, while pointing to a green screen behind him, "Can you say budget? We can't. We're actually contractually not allowed to bring it up."

=== Awards ===
NOMINATED
Gemini Awards:
- Best Music, Variety Program or Series
  - 2007–Video on Trial (Episode 2.13, "Video on Trial: '80s Superstars"; producers: Kerry Cunningham, Jason Ford, and John Kampilis)

== Related shows ==
- Stars on Trial
- Stars Gone Wild
