= The ALTdot COMedy Lounge =

Comedy show in Toronto, Canada

The ALTdot Comedy Lounge is a cabaret-style alternative comedy show in Toronto, Canada.

Since 1996, the ALTdot Comedy Lounge has hosted alternative, non-traditional and new material, with drop-in comedians from around the world. It runs every Monday at The Rivoli.

The show was a product of the alternative comedy movement of the late 1990s, such as Largo and Uncabaret in Los Angeles and Luna Lounge in New York. The Kids in the Hall had a Rivoli residency show on Mondays in the 1990s. In 2005 a Tuesday show, The Sketch Comedy Lounge, was added and ran until 2011. The first Tuesday of every month there is an ALTdot Open Mic where the producer can see some emerging comedians showcase and one comic gets a spot on a future ALTdot.

The show is produced by Lorne Perlmutar.

The Rivoli's ALTdot COMedy show is "relate[ed to] avant-garde arts scenes, experimental music genres such as punk and jazz, and alternative theatre such as sketch comedy."

== Performers ==
=== Comedians ===
- Boyd Banks
- Ryan Belleville
- Lewis Black
- Brent Butt
- Craig Campbell
- Martha Chaves
- Sean Cullen
- Gerry Dee
- Debra DiGiovanni
- Jon Dore
- Harry Doupe
- Jo-Anna Downey
- Derek Edwards
- Laurie Elliot
- Chris Finn
- Arthur Simeon
- Mark Forward
- Stewart Francis
- Janeane Garofalo
- Tom Green
- Adam Growe
- Rich Hall
- Mitch Hedberg
- Jessica Holmes
- Bruce Hunter
- Ron James
- Elvira Kurt
- Craig Lauzon
- Steve Levine
- Chris Locke
- Gilson Lubin
- Shaun Majumder
- Mike Moses
- Alex Nussbaum
- Alan Park
- Nikki Payne
- Simon Rakoff
- Dan Redican
- Jennifer Robertson
- Kenny Robinson
- Katherine Ryan
- Ron Sparks
- Winston Spear
- Eric Tunney
- Kristeen von Hagen
- Harland Williams
- Robin Williams
- Mike Wilmot
- Fraser Young
- Pete Zedlacher

=== Sketch Troupes ===
- The Bobroom
- Corky and the Juice Pigs
- The Distractions
- The Frantics (aka Four on the Floor)
- The GTOs
- The Gurg
- The Minnesota Wrecking Crew
- The Polecats
- The Sketchersons
