= Comedy Now! =

Canadian comedy television series

- Country of origin: Canada
- Original language: English
- No. of seasons: 14

Production
- Running time: 30 minutes

Original release
- Network: CTV
- Release: October 17, 1997 – December 31, 2014

Comedy Now! is a Canadian comedy television series which debuted in 1997 and ended in 2014 featuring the newest in Canadian comedic talent. The show has won numerous Gemini Awards as well as many international awards. It is broadcast in Canada on The Comedy Network and CTV while in the United States, the program airs on Comedy Central.

The show has started the careers of notable Canadian comedians, including Brent Butt, Gavin Crawford, Shaun Majumder, Russell Peters, Pete Zedlacher and Harland Williams and has showcased comedians such as Trent McClellan, Darcy Michael, Graham Chittenden and Eric Tunney.

Most episodes of the series featured a single comedian performing a stand-up set, although a few highlighted sketch comedy troupes and a number of "gala" episodes featuring several comedians were also aired as specials. These included Women of the Night, a "women in comedy" special which aired in 2001 with Brigitte Gall, Aurora Browne, Jen Goodhue, Sabrina Jalees, Diana Love and Renee Percy. This episode garnered a Gemini Award nomination for Best Comedy Program at the 17th Gemini Awards in 2002.

== Performers ==
=== Solo performers ===
- David Acer
- Dana Alexander
- Todd Allen
- Peter Anthony
- Ali Rizvi Badshah
- Ian Bagg
- James Ball
- Ryan Belleville
- Rachel Bertrand
- John Beuhler
- Big Daddy Tazz
- Matt Billon
- Trevor Boris
- Rick Bronson
- Kedar Brown
- Mike Bullard
- Brent Butt
- Chuck Byrn
- Lars Callieou
- Martha Chaves
- Graham Chittenden
- Graham Clark
- Greg Cochrane
- Carla Collins
- Sean Collins
- Casey Corbin
- Simon B. Cotter
- Gavin Crawford
- Judy Croon
- Miller Crosby
- Seán Cullen
- James Cunningham
- Rick Currie
- Roman Danylo
- Kate Davis
- Ivan Decker
- Gerry Dee
- Eddie Della Siepe
- Charlie Demers
- Sunee Dhaliwal
- Debra DiGiovanni
- Gord Disley
- Jon Dore
- Derek Edwards
- Ronnie Edwards
- Lou Eisen
- Ophira Eisenberg
- Joey Elias
- Laurie Elliott
- Mark Farrell
- Jebb Fink
- Chris Finn
- Mark Forward
- Heidi Foss
- Glen Foster
- Stewart Francis
- Darren Frost
- Brigitte Gall
- Johnny Gardhouse
- Michael Gelbart
- Lori Gibbs
- Jenn Grant
- Andrew Grose
- Adam Growe
- Phil Hanley
- Toby Hargrave
- Jonny Harris
- Jy Harris
- Tyler Hawkins
- Paul Haywood
- Dave Hemstad
- Jessica Holmes
- Jeremy Hotz
- Ron James
- Dean Jenkinson
- Andrea Jensen
- Pete Johansson
- Daryn Jones
- Ron Josol
- Barry Julien
- Peter Kelamis
- Don Kelly
- John Ki
- Simon King
- Rebecca Kohler
- Elvira Kurt
- Greg Lawrence
- Nigel Lawrence
- Brian Lazanik
- Derick Lengwenus
- Steve Levine
- Dan Licoppe
- Mark Little
- Gilson Lubin
- Levi MacDougall
- Nathan Macintosh
- Cory Mack
- Shaun Majumder
- Darryl Makk
- Patrick Maliha
- Greg Malone
- Jay Malone
- Dave Martin
- J.P. Mass
- David John McCarthey
- Trent McClellan
- Wade McElwain
- Jeff McEnery
- Bonnie McFarlane
- Terry McGurrin
- A.J. McKenzie
- Jim McNally
- Darcy Michael
- Howie Miller
- Lawrence Morgenstern
- Paul Myrehaug
- Alex Nussbaum
- Tim Nutt
- Dave Nystrom
- Matt O'Brien
- Adam Pal
- Alan Park
- Adam Pateman
- Lachlan Patterson
- Steve Patterson
- Jean Paul
- Nikki Payne
- Russell Peters
- Perry Perlmutar
- Sean Proudlove
- David Pryde
- Rob Pue
- Darryl Purvis
- Chris Quigley
- Dan Quinn
- Tim Rabnett
- Kyle Radke
- Al Rae
- Dylan Rhymer
- Kenny Robinson
- John Rogers
- Darrin Rose
- Rob Ross
- Jeff Rothpan
- Jason Rouse
- Richard Ryder
- Tim Rykert
- Nile Séguin
- Erica Sigurdson
- Ian Sirota
- Allyson Smith
- Tracy Smith
- Ron Sparks
- Winston Spear
- Tom Stade
- Tim Steeves
- Jon Steinberg
- Gavin Stephens
- Sugar Sammy
- Paul Sveen
- Kelly Taylor
- Angelo Tsarouchas
- Damonde Tschritter
- Sean Tweedly
- Eric Tunney
- Kerry Unger
- Kristeen Von Hagen
- Mark Walker
- Christina Walkinshaw
- Alan Watt
- Peter White
- Jason John Whitehead
- Harland Williams
- Ryan Wilner
- John Wing
- Fraser Young
- Jeffrey Yu
- Pete Zedlacher

=== Sketch troupes and specials ===
- The Bobroom
- Bowser & Blue
- The Doo-Wops: John Catucci, David Mesiano
- Not Getting It: Adrian Churchill, Terry McGurrin, Anne Marie Scheffler
- Not to Be Repeated: Ed Sahely, Kathy Greenwood, Jonathan Wilson
- Skippy's Rangers: Jonathan Crombie, Lisa Lambert, Bob Martin, Paul O'Sullivan
- Women of the Night: Brigitte Gall, Aurora Browne, Jen Goodhue, Sabrina Jalees, Diana Love, Renee Percy
- Women of the Night, Pt. 2: Aurora Browne, Renee Percy

== Awards ==
Several comedians who appeared on the series received Gemini Award nominations or wins for Best Performance in a Comedy Series, Individual or Ensemble (1997-1999) or Individual Performance in a Comedy Series (2000-2010):

- John Rogers — 12th Gemini Awards (Spring 1998)
- Brent Butt — 13th Gemini Awards (Fall 1998)
- Shaun Majumder — 14th Gemini Awards (1999)
- Gavin Crawford — 15th Gemini Awards (2000)
- Harland Williams — 15th Gemini Awards (2000)
- Jason Rouse — 16th Gemini Awards (2001)
- Glen Foster — 16th Gemini Awards (2001)
- Jessica Holmes — 16th Gemini Awards (2001)
- Nikki Payne — 18th Gemini Awards (2003)
- Russell Peters — 19th Gemini Awards (2004)
- Levi MacDougall — 20th Gemini Awards (2005)
- Terry McGurrin — 24th Gemini Awards (2009)

Greg Malone's special, Pocket Queen, won an award at the 1999 WorldFest-Houston International Film Festival.
