= 7th Canadian Comedy Awards =

Festival and awards ceremony for works of 2005

- Date: 27 October 2006
- Location: London Music Hall Complex; London, Ontario
- Country: Canada
- Presented by: Canadian Comedy Foundation for Excellence
- Hosted by: Debra DiGiovanni

Highlights
- Most wins: Corner Gas and Slings & Arrows (2)
- Most nominations: Television: Corner Gas (7); Film: Leo (4)
- Website: www.canadiancomedyawards.org

The 7th Canadian Comedy Awards, presented by the Canadian Comedy Foundation for Excellence (CCFE), honoured the best live, television, and film comedy of 2005 and was held on 27 October 2006 in London, Ontario. The ceremony was hosted by Debra DiGiovanni.

Canadian Comedy Awards, also known as Beavers, were awarded in 20 categories. Winners were picked by members of ACTRA (Alliance of Canadian Cinema, Television and Radio Artists), the Canadian Actors' Equity Association, the Writers Guild of Canada, the Directors Guild of Canada, and the Comedy Association.

TV series Corner Gas led with seven nominations followed by the film Leo with four. Corner Gas won two Beavers as did Mark McKinney for the second season of Slings & Arrows. Mike MacDonald received the first Dave Broadfoot Award for comic genius.

The ceremony was held during the five-day Canadian Comedy Awards Festival which showcased performances by the nominees and other artists. A gala review on the final day of the festival was taped and broadcast by The Comedy Network, marking the awards' first television presence since 2001.

== Festival ==
The 6th Canadian Comedy Awards and Festival ran from 24 to 28 October 2005 in London, Ontario, its fourth year in the city. Each day featured talent showcases by local comics, nominees and other visiting performers. There were also workshops including one on laughter in the workplace.

The festival was closed with a gala review on 28 October, the night following the awards ceremony, hosted by Mark McKinney and featuring the Royal Canadian Air Farce, Mike MacDonald and Derek Edwards. This gala was taped and broadcast by The Comedy Network, marking the Canadian Comedy Awards' first presence on television since 2001.

== Ceremony ==
The 6th Canadian Comedy Awards ceremony was held on 27 October 2006, hosted by Debra DiGiovanni, the 2002 winner for best stand-up newcomer.

== Winners and nominees ==
Winners were voted on by 18,000 members of ACTRA (Alliance of Canadian Cinema, Television and Radio Artists), the Canadian Actors' Equity Association, the Writers Guild of Canada, the Directors Guild of Canada, and the Comedy Association. Winners are listed first and highlighted in boldface:

=== Live ===
Best Taped Live Performance	Best Stand-up Newcomer
**The Minnesota Wrecking Crew** – **Sketch with Kevin McDonald**; Peter Kelamis – Comedy Now!; David Mesiano, John Catucci – The Doo Wops – Just For Laughs; Jeremy Hotz – Just For Laughs; The Imponderables: Dave Brennan, Tony Lombardo, Jon Smith, Eric Toth – Sketch with Kevin McDonald	**Jon Dore**; Derek Lengwenus; Graham Clark; Jeff McEnery; Mark Bennett
Best Male Stand-up	Best Female Stand-up
**Pete Zedlacher**; Alan Park; Gerry Dee; Ryan Belleville; Tim Nutt	**Laurie Elliott**; Kate Davis; Kristeen von Hagen; Martha Chaves; Nikki Payne
Best Male Improviser	Best Female Improviser
**Kerry Griffin**; Dan Joffre; Ian Boothby; Jason Bryden; Rick Wharton	**Lauren Ash**; Diana Frances; Jamillah Ross; Lisa Merchant; Margaret Nyfors
Best Sketch Troupe or Company	Best Improv Troupe or Company
**The Second City Reloaded Cast**; Canadian Content; The Imponderables; The Minnesota Wrecking Crew; The Sketchersons	**Cast of Die-Nasty**; AKA Improv: Cage Match Vancouver; Monkey Toast; Slap Happy; Urban Improv
Best One Person Show	Best Comedic Play, Revue or Series
**Trapped in Taffeta**; Comedy in Motion; I Don't Believe in Physics; Tippi Seagram's Happy Hour	**SARSical the Musical**; C'est What; Reservoir Bitches; The Second City: Reloaded; The Ultimate Comedy Show

=== Television ===
Best Performance by a Male	Best Performance by a Female
**Mark McKinney** – **Slings & Arrows**; Eric Peterson – Corner Gas; Jeff Seymour – Jeff Ltd.; Alan Park – Royal Canadian Air Farce; Gavin Crawford – This Hour Has 22 Minutes	**Janet Wright** – **Corner Gas**; Jennifer Robertson – Comedy Inc.; Nancy Robertson – Corner Gas; Martha Burns – Slings & Arrows; Cathy Jones – This Hour Has 22 Minutes
Best Direction in a Series	Best Direction in a Special or episode
**Robert de Lint** and **David Storey** – **Corner Gas**; Steve Di Marco – Jeff Ltd.; Carl Harvey – Just For Laughs; Shawn Alex Thompson – Puppets Who Kill – "Dan and the Garden Shears"; Ken Finkleman – The Newsroom	**Dan Redican, Rick Green, Peter Wildman** and **Paul Chato** – **The Frantics Reunion Special**; David Storey – Corner Gas – v; Henry Sarwer-Foner – Hatching, Matching and Dispatching – episode #6; Shawn Alex Thompson – Puppets Who Kill – v; Bruce McDonald – The Tournament – episode #2.10
Best Writing in a Series	Best Writing in a Special or episode
**Susan Coyne, Bob Martin** and **Mark McKinney** – **Slings & Arrows**; Roman Danylo, Aurora Browne, Jen Goodhue, Terry McGurrin, Winston Spear, Gavin Stephens, Jennifer Robertson, Albert Howell, Ian Sirota – Comedy Inc.; Brent Butt, Mark Farrell – Corner Gas – "The Littlest Yarbo"; Alan Park – Royal Canadian Air Farce; Howard Nemetz, Howard Busgang – The Tournament – season 2	**John Pattison – Puppets Who Kill – "The Joyride"**; Peter Kelamis – Comedy Now! – "Peter Kelamis"; Brent Butt, Paul Mather, Kevin White, Mark Farrell – Corner Gas – "Merry Gasmas"; Rick Green – History Bites – Mother Britain; Howard Nemetz, Marty Putz – The Tournament – episode #2.10

=== Film ===
Best Performance by a Male	Best Performance by a Female
**Seán Cullen** – **Phil the Alien**; Joe Pingue – Leo; Marcello Cabezas – Leo; Jim Annan – Lovegirl	**Jennifer Robertson** – **Twitches**; Lisa Wegner – Chasing Aces; Robin Bublick – Lovegirl
Best Direction	Best Writing
**Donnie Mullins** – **Chasing Aces**; David Hyde – Leo; Brett Heard, Nick deGruff – Lovegirl	**Adam Till** – **Leo**; Robin Bublick – Lovegirl

=== Special awards ===
Chairman's Award	Dave Broadfoot Award
**Roger Abbott**; **Don Ferguson**	**Mike MacDonald**

== Multiple wins ==
The following people, shows, films, etc. received multiple awards

Awards	Person or work
2	Corner Gas
2	Slings & Arrows

== Multiple nominations ==
The following people, shows, films, etc. received multiple nominations

Nominations	Person or work
7	Corner Gas
4	Leo
4	Lovegirl
3	Puppets Who Kill
2	Comedy Inc.
2	Jeff Ltd.
2	Royal Canadian Air Farce
2	This Hour Has 22 Minutes
2	The Tournament
