= Gemini Award for Individual Performance in a Comedy Program or Series =

Discontinued annual Canadian media award

The Gemini Award for Best Individual Performance in a Comedy Program or Series is a defunct award category, presented by the Academy of Canadian Cinema and Television from 2001 to 2010 as part of its Gemini Awards program.

When the Gemini Awards were first introduced in 1986, awards were presented for Best Actor in a Comedy Series and Best Actress in a Comedy Series. However, as Canadian television comedy was dominated in that era primarily by sketch comedy, comedy-drama or stand-up performance shows, rather than traditional sitcoms, comedy performance categories were discontinued after the 2nd Gemini Awards in 1987; for the next few years, performances in comedy-drama shows were eligible to be nominated in the drama performance categories, while sketch comedy performers could be nominated for Best Performance in a Variety or Performing Arts Program or Series.

Beginning with the 6th Gemini Awards in 1992, the Academy introduced a single award for Best Performance in a Comedy Program or Series, whose winners or nominees could be either an individual or an ensemble; separate awards for individual performance and ensemble performance were then introduced for the 16th Gemini Awards in 2001.

After 2010, with the reemergence of scripted comedy series in Canadian television, the category was discontinued. Separate categories for Best Actor in a Comedy Series and Best Actress in a Comedy Series were reintroduced, alongside new categories for Best Supporting Actor in a Comedy Series and Best Supporting Actress in a Comedy Series, as of the 26th Gemini Awards in 2011. Since 2012, all four of the separate categories have continued to be presented as part of the contemporary Canadian Screen Awards.

== Winners and nominees ==
Year	Actor	Series	Ref
2001; 16th Gemini Awards
2001; 16th Gemini Awards	Jason Rouse	Comedy Now!	
2001; 16th Gemini Awards	Glen Foster	Comedy Now!	
2001; 16th Gemini Awards	Jessica Holmes	Comedy Now!	
2001; 16th Gemini Awards	Shaun Majumder	Halifax Comedy Festival	
2001; 16th Gemini Awards	Jonathan Torrens	Jonovision	
2002; 17th Gemini Awards
2002; 17th Gemini Awards	Bette MacDonald	Halifax Comedy Festival	
2002; 17th Gemini Awards	Jayne Eastwood	The Endless Grind	
2002; 17th Gemini Awards	Peter Keleghan	Royal Canadian Air Farce	
2002; 17th Gemini Awards	Nikki Payne	Halifax Comedy Festival	
2003; 18th Gemini Awards
2003; 18th Gemini Awards	Brian Hartt	Winnipeg Comedy Festival	
2003; 18th Gemini Awards	Omid Djalili	Just for Laughs	
2003; 18th Gemini Awards	Leonie Forbes	Lord Have Mercy!	
2003; 18th Gemini Awards	Linda Kash	Made in Canada	
2003; 18th Gemini Awards	Nikki Payne	Comedy Now!	
2004; 19th Gemini Awards
2004; 19th Gemini Awards	Gavin Crawford	This Hour Has 22 Minutes: "Episode 4"	
2004; 19th Gemini Awards	Gavin Crawford	The Gavin Crawford Show: "Oh the Huge Manatee"	
2004; 19th Gemini Awards	Roman Danylo	Comedy Inc.	
2004; 19th Gemini Awards	Shaun Majumder	Comedy from the Coast	
2004; 19th Gemini Awards	Russell Peters	Comedy Now!	
2005; 20th Gemini Awards
2005; 20th Gemini Awards	Mary Walsh	Hatching, Matching and Dispatching	
2005; 20th Gemini Awards	Irwin Barker	Halifax Comedy Festival	
2005; 20th Gemini Awards	Lewis Black	Just for Laughs	
2005; 20th Gemini Awards	Colin Fox	Puppets Who Kill: "Buttons the Dresser"	
2005; 20th Gemini Awards	Levi MacDougall	Comedy Now!	
2006; 21st Gemini Awards
2006; 21st Gemini Awards	Mark McKinney	Robson Arms: "A Material Breach"	
2006; 21st Gemini Awards	Brigitte Bako	G-Spot: "HBO"	
2006; 21st Gemini Awards	Danny Bhoy	Just for Laughs	
2006; 21st Gemini Awards	Derek Edwards	Halifax Comedy Festival	
2006; 21st Gemini Awards	Jeremy Hotz	Just for Laughs	
2006; 21st Gemini Awards	Richard Waugh	Jimmy MacDonald's Canada: "The Lost Episodes: The Canadian Sexplosion"	
2007; 22nd Gemini Awards
2007; 22nd Gemini Awards	Phyllis Ellis	The Wilkinsons: "I Don't Want to Lose You to LA"	
2007; 22nd Gemini Awards	John Cleese	Just for Laughs	
2007; 22nd Gemini Awards	Elvira Kurt	Halifax Comedy Festival: "Episode 3"	
2007; 22nd Gemini Awards	Rick Mercer	Rick Mercer Report: "Episode 5"	
2007; 22nd Gemini Awards	Teresa Pavlinek	The Jane Show: "House of Jane"	
2008; 23rd Gemini Awards
2008; 23rd Gemini Awards	Jo Koy	Just for Laughs	
2008; 23rd Gemini Awards	Natalie Brown	Sophie: "Door Number Two"	
2008; 23rd Gemini Awards	Louis C.K.	Just for Laughs	
2008; 23rd Gemini Awards	Jon Dore	The Jon Dore Television Show: "Jon Gets Scared"	
2008; 23rd Gemini Awards	Ian Sirota	Comedy Inc.: "Episode 4x03"	
2009; 24th Gemini Awards
2009; 24th Gemini Awards	Debra DiGiovanni	Halifax Comedy Festival	
2009; 24th Gemini Awards	Benjamin Arthur	Less Than Kind: "Pakikisama"	
2009; 24th Gemini Awards	Jon Dore	The Jon Dore Television Show: "Jon Does Drugs"	
2009; 24th Gemini Awards	Terry McGurrin	Comedy Now!: "Comedy Now! starring Terry McGurrin"	
2009; 24th Gemini Awards	Brooke Palsson	Less Than Kind: "French Is My Kryptonite"	
2010; 25th Gemini Awards
2010; 25th Gemini Awards	Benjamin Arthur	Less Than Kind: "That's Somebody's Knish!"	
2010; 25th Gemini Awards	Lisa Durupt	Less Than Kind: "Road Trip"	
2010; 25th Gemini Awards	Wendel Meldrum	Less Than Kind: "I Am Somewhere"	
2010; 25th Gemini Awards	Rick Mercer	Rick Mercer Report: "Episode 1"	
2010; 25th Gemini Awards	Pete Zedlacher	Just for Laughs	
