= 2nd Canadian Comedy Awards =

Awards ceremony for works of 2000

- Date: April 2001
- Location: The Guvernment; Toronto, Ontario
- Country: Canada
- Presented by: Canadian Comedy Foundation for Excellence
- Hosted by: Sheila McCarthy and Patrick McKenna

Highlights
- Most wins: Television: This Hour Has 22 Minutes (3); Film: Best in Show (3)
- Most nominations: Television: This Hour Has 22 Minutes (6); Film: Best in Show and Waydowntown (4)
- Website: www.canadiancomedyawards.org

Television/radio coverage
- Network: The Comedy Network

The 2nd Canadian Comedy Awards, presented by the Canadian Comedy Foundation for Excellence (CCFE), honoured the best live, television, and film comedy of 2000 and was held in April 2001 at The Guvernment in Toronto, Ontario. The ceremony was hosted by Sheila McCarthy and Patrick McKenna and was televised by The Comedy Network.

Canadian Comedy Awards, also known as Beavers, were awarded in 19 categories. Winners were picked by members of ACTRA (Alliance of Canadian Cinema, Television and Radio Artists), the Writers Guild of Canada, the Directors Guild of Canada, and the Comedy Association.

The TV series This Hour Has 22 Minutes led with six nominations followed by Made in Canada with five, and the films Best in Show, New Waterford Girl and Waydowntown with four apiece. The big winners were Best in Show and This Hour Has 22 Minutes which each received three Beavers, followed by The Second City Mainstage which won for best sketch troupe and best improv troupe.

== Ceremony ==
The 2nd Canadian Comedy Awards ceremony was held in April 2001 at The Guvernment in Toronto, Ontario. The ceremony was hosted by Sheila McCarthy and Patrick McKenna.

The awards ceremony was televised by The Comedy Network. The Star! entertainment channel on Rogers cable carried Before the Laughter: The Canadian Comedy Awards Pre-Show.

The 2001 Canadian Comedy Awards show was nominated for a Gemini Award for best writing in a comedy or variety program.

== Winners and nominees ==
Winners are listed first and highlighted in boldface:

=== Live ===
Best Male Stand-up	Best Female Stand-up	Best Stand-up Newcomer
**Brent Butt**; Derek Edwards; Jebb Fink; Mike Wilmot; Tom Stade	**Elvira Kurt**; Heidi Foss; Kristeen von Hagen; Martha Chaves; Shannon Laverty	**Nikki Payne**; David Pryde; John Beuhler; Ryan Belleville; Ryan Wilner
Best Male Improviser		Best Female Improviser
**Bruce Hunter**; Dan Joffre; Dana Anderson; Doug Morency; Peter Oldring		**Lisa Merchant**; Diana Frances; Jennifer Seguin; Lisa Brooke; Moira Dunphy; Rebecca Northan
Best Sketch Troupe or Company		Best Improv Troupe or Company
**The Second City Mainstage**; Atomic Fireballs; Goatee Boys; The Doo Wops; The GTO's		**The Second City Mainstage**; Cast of Die-Nasty; On the Spot; Slap Happy; The Chumps
Best One Person Show		Best New Play
**Noam Chomsky is an Asshole**, **Noam Rosen**; Living in My Mother's Basement; Martians in My Driveway; Shifting Gears; The Rise and Fall of Vella Dean		**Radio-30**; Mikayla; Sordido Deluxo; The Chick and Cubby Comedy Hour; White Mice

=== Television ===
Best Performance by a Male	Best Performance by a Female
**Colin Mochrie** – Whose Line is it Anyway?; Peter Keleghan – Made in Canada; Rick Mercer – Made in Canada; Will Sasso – MADtv; Gavin Crawford – The Gavin Crawford Show; Greg Thomey – This Hour Has 22 Minutes	**Cathy Jones** – This Hour Has 22 Minutes; Janet van de Graaf – History Bites; Leah Pinsent – Made in Canada; Jessica Holmes – The Itch; Mary Walsh – This Hour Has 22 Minutes
Best Direction in a Series	Best Direction in a Special or Episode
**Henry Sarwer-Foner** – **This Hour Has 22 Minutes**; Charles Winkler – Beggars and Choosers; Rick Green – History Bites; Ron Murphy – The Gavin Crawford Show	**Bob Sorger** – **The 2000 Canadian Comedy Awards**; Allan Manson – Holmes Alone; Robert Higden, Francois Jorbin – Smart and Smarter; Bruce Pirrie – Supertown Challenge; Allan Manson – The Bobroom
Best Writing in a Series	Best Writing in a Special or Episode
**Cathy Jones, Rick Mercer, Greg Thomey, Mary Walsh, Mark Farrell, Chris Finn, Edward Kay, Tim Steeves, George Westerholm, Luciano Casimiri, Michael Best, Randy Metson, Heidi Foss, Jordan Kawchuk, Paul Mather, Christian Murray, Kevin White** and **Peter McBain** – **This Hour Has 22 Minutes**; Mark Farrell, Rick Mercer, Ed Macdonald, Edward Riche, Alex Galatis, Alex Ganetakos, Raymond Storey – Made in Canada; Ian Boothby, Roger Fredericks – The Eleventh Hour; Gavin Crawford, Kyle Tingley, Jennifer Whalen – The Gavin Crawford Show; Don McKellar, Bob Martin – Twitch City	**Mark Farrell** – **Made in Canada**; Brigitte Gall, David Mackenzie, Blair Packham, Arlene Bishop – Brigitte Gall: Joan of Montreal; John Pattison – Puppets Who Kill; Glen Foster – Comedy Now!: "That Canadian Guy"; Jason Jones, Mike Beaver – The Bobroom

=== Film ===
Best Performance by a Male	Best Performance by a Female
**Eugene Levy** – **Best in Show**; Jim Carrey – How the Grinch Stole Christmas; William Shatner – Miss Congeniality; Don McKellar – Waydowntown; Fab Filippo – Waydowntown	**Catherine O'Hara – Best in Show**; Linda Kash – Best in Show; Liane Balaban – New Waterford Girl; Mary Walsh – New Waterford Girl; Fiona Loewi – Top of the Food Chain
Best Direction	Best Writing
**Allan Moyle** – **New Waterford Girl**; Wayne Abbott – Good Monday; John Paizs – Top of the Food Chain; Arto Paragamian – Two Thousand and None; Gary Burns – Waydowntown	**Eugene Levy** – **Best in Show**; Ken Cuperus – Good Monday; Tricia Fish – New Waterford Girl; Phil Bedard, Larry Lalonde – Top of the Food Chain; Gary Burns – Waydowntown

=== Special awards ===
Hall of Fame	The Bluma Appel "That's Funny" Award
Royal Canadian Air Farce; Rich Little	Ryan Belleville

== Multiple wins ==
The following people, shows, films, etc. received multiple awards

Awards	Person or work
3	Best in Show
3	This Hour Has 22 Minutes
2	Eugene Levy

== Multiple nominations ==
The following people, shows, films, etc. received multiple nominations.

Nominations	Person or work
6	This Hour Has 22 Minutes
5	Made in Canada
4	Best in Show
4	New Waterford Girl
4	Waydowntown
3	The Gavin Crawford Show
2	Eugene Levy
2	Good Monday
2	History Bites
2	Top of the Food Chain
