= List of Canadian Comedy Awards ceremonies =

Founded in 1999, the Canadian Comedy Awards have a mandate "to recognize, celebrate and promote Canadian achievements in comedy at home and abroad." The awards ceremonies are known for placing "gags over glamour", with quick wit and improvisational skills showcased by hosts, presenters and recipients. From 2002 to 2015, the awards ceremony was held as part of the Canadian Comedy Awards Festival, which featured dozens of comedy events.

No.	Date	Venue	Host city	Host(s)	Artist of the Year (Note: Artist of the Year, a.k.a. Canadian Comedy Person of the Year, was first awarded in 2008.)	Festival	Televised (Note: Unless otherwise noted, specified events were taped for broadcast on The Comedy Network. There was also a 10th anniversary special broadcast in 2010.)	Ref
1st	6 Apr 2000	Masonic Temple	Toronto, Ontario	Dave Thomas	—	—	CTV; The Comedy Network	
2nd	Apr 2001	The Guvernment	Toronto	Sheila McCarthy; Patrick McKenna	—	—	The Comedy Network; Star! (Note: Star! broadcast the awards pre-show.)	
3rd	4 Apr 2002	The Docks	Toronto	Brent Butt	—	—	—	
4th	Sep 2003	Grand Theatre	London, Ontario	Royal Canadian Air Farce	—	— (Note: A 3-day festival was held but the dates are not known.)	—	
5th	Oct 2004	—	London	Scott Thompson	—	—	—	
6th	22 Oct 2005	—	London	Bruce Hunter as Rocko the Dog	—	18–22 Oct	—	
7th	27 Oct 2006	London Music Hall Complex	London	Debra DiGiovanni	—	24–28 Oct	Gala review only	
8th	12 Oct 2007	London Music Hall Complex	London	Ryan Belleville	—	9–13 Oct	Variety specials only	
9th	5 Oct 2008	Casino Regina	Regina, Saskatchewan	Alan Park	Seth Rogen	1–5 Oct	Variety special only	
10th	2 Oct 2009	Imperial Theatre	Saint John, New Brunswick	Seán Cullen	Seth Rogen	1–4 Oct	Variety special only	
11th	18 Oct 2010	Winter Garden Theatre	Toronto	Dave Foley	Irwin Barker (Note: Awarded posthumously)	14–18 Oct	—	
12th	17 Oct 2011	Isabel Bader Theatre	Toronto	Steve Patterson	Samantha Bee	13–17 Oct	—	
13th	26 Aug 2012	Fairmont Royal York	Toronto	Alan Thicke	Nikki Payne	23–26 Aug	—	
14th	6 Oct 2013	Centrepointe Theatre	Ottawa, Ontario	Ryan Belleville	Colin Mochrie	3–6 Oct	—	
15th	14 Sep 2014	Ottawa Little Theatre	Ottawa	Tom Green	Dave Foley	10–14 Sep	—	
16th	13 Sep 2015	Toronto Reference Library	Toronto	—	Samantha Bee	—	—	
17th	6 Nov 2016	The Second City	Toronto	—	Mike Ward	—	—	
18th	18 Jun 2018	—	Toronto	—	Mike MacDonald	—	—	
19th	4 Jun 2019	The Second City	Toronto	Ali Hassan	Catherine O'Hara	—	—	
