= Winnipeg Comedy Festival =

Comedy event in Winnipeg, Canada

- Status: Active
- Frequency: Annually
- Venue: Various
- Locations: Winnipeg, Manitoba, Canada
- Established: 2002
- Founders: Lara Rae and Tom Anniko
- Next event: May 2–7, 2023
- Sponsor: Manitoba Liquor Mart
- Website: winnipegcomedyfestival.com

The Winnipeg Comedy Festival (WCF) is an annual national comedy festival, held in Winnipeg, Manitoba. The week-long festival takes place at several venues throughout the city, featuring stand-up, sketch, and improvisational comedy.

Performances from the festival are broadcast as a radio series on CBC Radio One and as a television series on The Comedy Network and CBC Television. It is the highest rated comedy festival series on CBC Television.

== History ==
The Winnipeg Comedy Festival was created in 2002 by comedian Lara Rae and CBC Radio producer Tom Anniko, who pitched the idea of a weekend-long comedy festival that could be recorded and aired on CBC Radio. Partnering with the Gas Station Arts Centre in Winnipeg's Osborne Village, the WCF was established soon after.

Anniko—who at the time was working as executive producer for radio comedy and drama for CBC—saw the festival as an opportunity to "try out new shows" that could be developed for radio. As such, he claims, CBC's The Debaters is one such show that came out of the festival, along with various other pilots and specials.

Comic headliners of the inaugural year were Dave Broadfoot, Cathy Jones, and David Steinberg. Comedian Brian Hartt's performance that year won the Gemini Award for Individual Performance in a Comedy Program or Series during the 18th Gemini Awards in 2023.

== Programs ==
Year	Headliners	Highlights
2002	Dave Broadfoot; Cathy Jones; David Steinberg	Brian Hartt's performance that year won the Gemini Award for Individual Performance in a Comedy Program or Series during the 18th Gemini Awards in 2003.
2003	A. Whitney Brown; Brent Butt; Dean Jenkinson; Gavin Crawford; George Westerholm; Irwin Barker; Jessica Holmes; John Wing Jr.; Mark McKinney; Ron James	The festival expands to include two rural tours, visiting 4 English and 4 French communities.
2004	Bill Richardson; Mark Critch; Colin Mochrie; Dave Broadfoot; Derek Edwards; Glen Foster; Graham Greene; Lorne Elliott; Patrick McKenna; Ralph Benmergui; Russell Peters; Shaun Majumder	
2005	A. Whitney Brown; Cathy Jones; Glen Foster; Irwin Barker; Jeremy Hotz; Jessica Holmes; Joey Elias; John Wing; Mark McKinney; Roger Abbott; Russell Peters; Sean Cullen	
2006	Bubbles (Mike Smith); Derek Edwards; George Stroumboulopoulos; Glen Foster; Irwin Baker; John Wing; Roddy Piper; Shaun Majumder; Sugar Sammy	CBC Radio comedy series The Debaters premiered with host Shaun Majumder. Mike Smith's performance as Bubbles was nominated for a Gemini Award in the category of Best Host of a Comedy or Variety Show. Some of the year's galas debuted on the Comedy Network.
2007	Andrea Martin; Joe Flaherty; Sean Cullen; Patrick McKenna; Elvira Kurt; Lorne Cardinal; Sugar Sammy; Joey Elias; Shaun Majumder	
2008	Colin Mochrie; Debra McGrath; Gerry Dee; Mike Wilmot; Dennis Hull; Mrs. Hughes; Roman Danylo; Teresa Pavlinek; Jimmy Tingle; John Wing; Big Daddy Tazz	To promote the festival, Big Daddy Tazz held a stand-up marathon on April Fools' Day, performing 8.5 hours of uninterrupted, original material.
2009	Elvira Kurt; Irwin Barker; Deb McGrath; Debra DiGiovanni; Trevor Boris; Kevin O'Leary; Don Ferguson; Sean Cullen; Teresa Pavlinek; Ed Sahely; Jonathan Wilson; Andy Jones; John Wing; Big Daddy Tazz	
2010	Elvira Kurt; Irwin Barker; Cathy Jones; Nikki Payne; Trevor Boris; Steve Patterson; Scott Thompson; Jon Dore; Peter Keleghan; Barry Kennedy; Gordon Pinsent; Patrick McKenna; John Wing; Mike MacDonald; Gerry Dee	
2011	Andrea Martin; Howie Mandel; Nikki Payne; Jason Priestley; Jon Dore	
2012	Alan Thicke; Shannon Tweed; Caroline Rhea; Harland Williams; David Steinberg; Michael Winslow	
2013	Steve Patterson; Sean Cullen; Jonathan Torrens; Debra DiGiovanni	
2014	Sandra Shamas; Daryn Jones; Tom Cavanagh; Darrin Rose; Tom Green	
2015	Ryan Belleville; Jonny Harris; Jeremy Hotz; Jessica Holmes; Shaun Majumder	
2016	Brent Butt; Craig Lauzon; Mary Walsh; Sean Cullen; Naomi Snieckus	
2017	Nikki Payne; Gavin Crawford; Tommy Chong; Will Sasso; Howie Miller	
2018	Chris Jericho; Paul Sun-Hyung Lee; Emma Hunter; Dave Foley; Jonathan Torrens	
