= Cream of Comedy =

Cream of Comedy was an annual award show broadcast by The Comedy Network that promoted emerging Canadian comedic talent in the early stage of their careers. The show was established in the memory of Toronto comedic performer Tim Sims and has raised significant annual contributions for the Tim Sims Encouragement Fund Award (TSEF).

Contestants included various comedy acts (often stand-up comics and character performers but also improvisers, duos, musicians and sketch troupes). A jury of comedy professionals would choose five finalists from a larger field of entrants/contestants to perform in the televised showcase. The Cream of Comedy special featured clips and 15-minute comedy performances by these five finalists, taped before a live audience for broadcast. The jury kept the winners' names strictly confidential until they were announced at the end of the Cream of Comedy special taping, and then the winners were presented with the Tim Sims Award, $5,000 and (in later years) a scholarship to the Toronto Second City Training Centre.

The show started in 1996 when The Second City's Toronto location donated its venue for the event. Four people donated money to begin the TSEF. The event was considered a training ground for relatively young comics, providing them national exposure for their talent. Past winners have included Gavin Crawford, Nathan Fielder, Ron Sparks, Katie Crown and Fraser Young.

Year	Host(s)	Winner(s)	Nominees
1996	Patrick McKenna	Jason Thompson	Harry Doupe, Ron James, and Jay Sankey
1997	Bruce Hunter	Fast & Dirty (Gord Oxley and Robert Hawke)	n/a
1998	Eric Tunney	Gavin Crawford	Dawn Whitwell, Tracy Dawson, Gord Disley, and Gavin Stephens
1999	Seán Cullen	Fraser Young	Dave Tomlinson, Craig Lauzon, Jessica Holmes, and Nugmutter
2000	Brent Butt	Laurie Elliott	Aurora Browne, Sam Easton, The Goatee Boys, and Darryl Purvis
2001	Colin Mochrie	Levi MacDougall	Ryan Belleville, Andy Boorman, Debra DiGiovanni, and Lex Vaughn
2002	Patrick McKenna	Tim Polley and Brad Hurt	Rachel Cantelon, Linda Ellis, and Kelvin Herod
2003	Dan Redican	Ron Sparks	Marty Adams, The Gurg, Calcu-Lator and The Oral Presentation, and Mae Martin.
2004	Elvira Kurt	Katie Crown	Darrin Rows, Iron Cobra (Becky Johnson and Graham Wagner), Knock Knock Who's There? Comedy!, and Mike Balazo
2005	Jon Dore	Jeff McEnery	Bob Kerr, Mack Lawrenz, Kathleen Phillips, and Pat Thornton
2006	Gavin Crawford and Aurora Browne	Nathan Fielder	Rebecca Addelman, Black Roses, Andrew Johnston, and Desiree Lavoy
2007	n/a	Nathan Macintosh	n/a
2008	n/a	7 Minutes of Heaven (Laura Cilevitz and Josh Saltzman)	n/a
2009	n/a	Calvin Storoschuk	n/a
2010	n/a	Mike Rita	n/a
2011	n/a	British Teeth (Filip Jeremic and Allanna Reoch)	n/a
2012	n/a	Christi Olson	n/a
2013	n/a	Nigel Grinstead	Brandon Ash-Mohammed, Diana Bailey, Franco Nguyen, and sketch duo The Weaker Vessels
2014	Jeff McEnery	Caitlin Langelier	Sam Burns, Moist Theatre, Brendan Pinto, and Jeremy Woodcock

Patrick McKenna hosted the inaugural show and returned to host again in 2002. That year, the jury became hopelessly deadlocked and so two winners were named: Tim Polley and Brad Hurt. To avoid this in the future, a new rule was made giving a tie-breaking vote to comedian Lindsay Leese, widow of Tim Sims and founder of the TSEF.

1998 winner Gavin Crawford and 2000 nominee Aurora Browne returned to co-host the show in 2006. 2005 winner Jeff McEnery hosted the show in 2014.

On October 26, 2015, Toronto's Second City staged the last Cream of Comedy show. It was the award event's 20th year.
