= Humber College Comedy program =

College program

The Humber Comedy Program was founded in 1999, at Humber College in Toronto, Ontario, Canada. Courses include stand-up, improvisation, scriptwriting, sketch comedy, and business aspects of the profession. The program features many mainstage class shows, a weekly Humber student show at Yuk Yuk's Comedy Club, and an organized showcase at Comedy Bar for scouts, directors, and agents with students included on the basis of merit.

== History ==
It was preceded in 1997 by an annual one-week intensive, created by Joe Kertes, called The Humber Comedy Workshop. Anne Beatts, Lorne Frohman, Joe Flaherty, George Shapiro, Carol Leifer, and Stephen Rosenfield were guests in this program in 1998.

At various points, instructors have included Robin Duke and Paul O'Sullivan.

Lorne Michaels has credited this program for his top talents when it comes to Saturday Night Live.

== Alumni ==
- Marty Adams
- Rebecca Addelman
- Ashley Comeau
- Kurtis Conner
- Debra DiGiovanni
- Dini Dimakos
- Sam Easton
- Nathan Fielder
- Mark Forward
- Ajay Fry
- Richard LeBlanc
- Karl Ludwig
- Levi MacDougall
- Jeff McEnery
- Nikki Payne
- Renee Percy
- Jason Rouse
- Steph Tolev
- Norm Sousa, Never Ever Do This at Home

Martha Chaves
