= Halifax Comedy Festival =

Comedy festival in Nova Scotia, Canada

The Halifax Comedy Festival (often spelled in promotional materials as Ha!ifax Comedy Festival) is an annual comedy festival held in Halifax, Nova Scotia, Canada. The festival is sponsored by the CBC which tapes and broadcasts the comedians' sets as a series of television specials, and is usually about one week long. Shows frequently take place at the Halifax Casino in The Schooner Showroom among other venues.

Live tapings of CBC Radio's hit show The Debaters have become a part of the annual festival, frequently using comedians who are performing in the festival as the 'debaters'.

== Past performers include ==
- Irwin Barker
- Ryan Belleville
- Mark Critch (frequently hosts)
- Debra DiGiovanni
- Cynthia Dunsford
- Derek Edwards
- Glen Foster
- Stewart Francis
- Doug Funk
- Cathy Jones
- Barry Julien
- Paul Myrehaug
- Gilson Lubin
- Mike MacDonald
- Darcy Michael
- Tim Nutt
- Steve Patterson
- Kevin Pollak
- Ron Sparks
- Winston Spear
- Tim Steeves
- Pete Zedlacher
- MJ Miller
- Kyle Barnet
