= Dana Alexander =

Canadian stand-up comedian

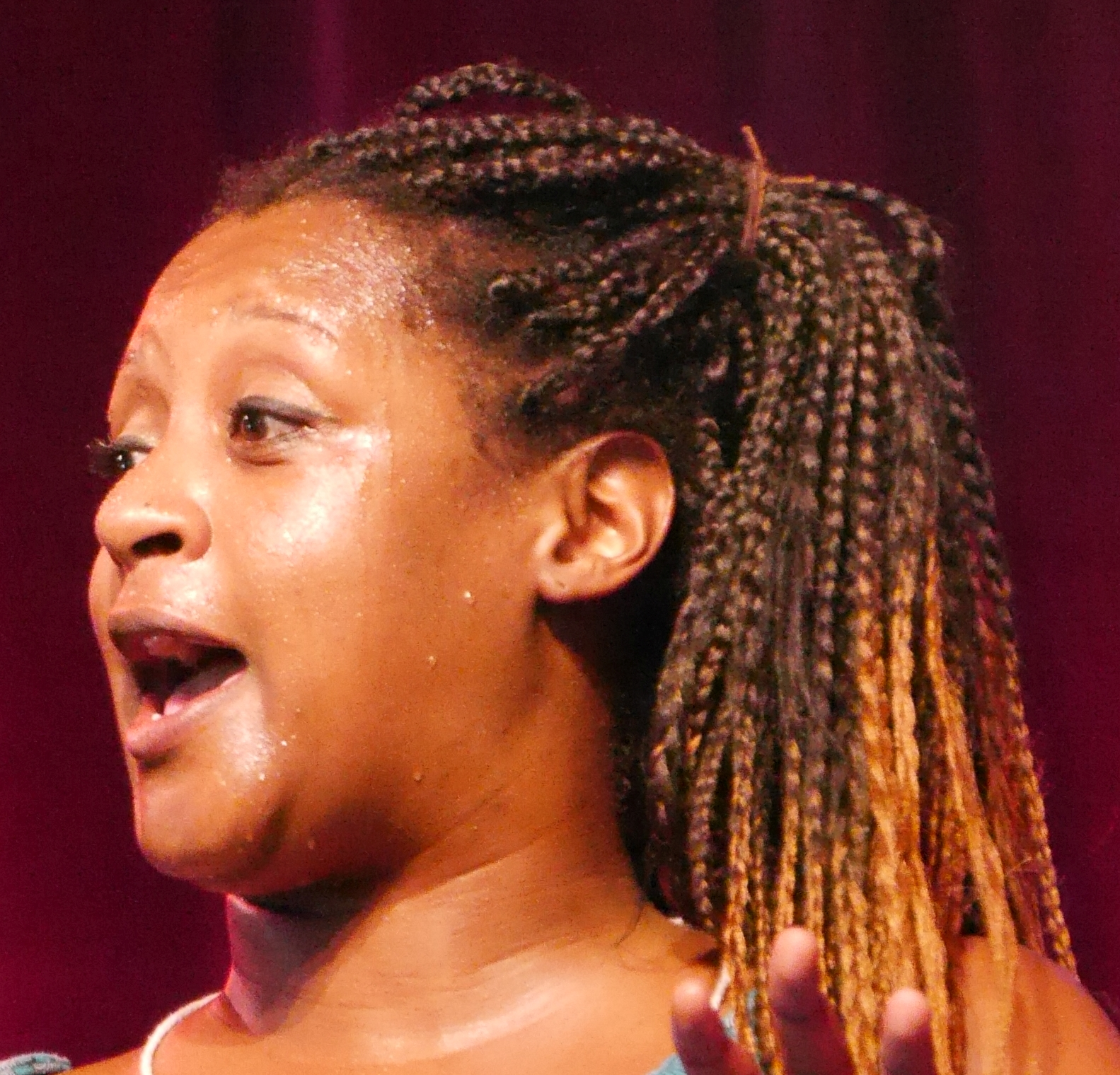
Alexander at the Glastonbury Festival, 2019

Dana Alexander is a Canadian stand-up comedian from Edmonton, Alberta, based in the United Kingdom.

She began her career on the stand-up comedy circuit in Canada, playing events such as the Halifax Comedy Festival and the Winnipeg Comedy Festival. She headlined her own Comedy Now! television special in 2010, and appeared in episodes of Video on Trial and The Debaters.

She moved to the UK in the early 2010s after having noteworthy successes with her comedy show at the Edinburgh Fringe Festival, and has appeared on British comedy panel television shows such as Russell Howard's Good News and Question Team. She was a Chortle Award nominee for Best Club Comic in 2012.
