= Jennifer Baxter =

Canadian actress and comedian

- Born: 1976 (age 48–49); Vancouver, British Columbia, Canada
- Occupation(s): Actress, comedian
- Years active: 1993–present
- Spouse: Mike Beaver

Jennifer Baxter (born 1976) is a Canadian actress and comedian formerly based out of Toronto and currently living in Los Angeles.

Her best-known roles include Number 9 in George A. Romero's Land of the Dead, Wanda on The Eleventh Hour, and lawyer Robin Howland on Billable Hours. She is also a well recognized face in a multitude of television commercials in Canada.

She portrayed Kelly Pitts in the backdoor pilot episode of The Game, though the role was later recast with Brittany Daniel. The CW did not provide a reason for the casting change.

== Filmography ==
=== Film ===
Year	Title	Role	Notes
2001	Knockaround Guys	Terri the waitress	
2004	Ham & Cheese	Katie Reed	
2005	Land of the Dead	Number 9 Zombie	
2008	Coopers' Camera	Aunt Bev	
2013	The Right Kind of Wrong	Jill	

=== Television ===
Year	Title	Role	Notes
1993	It's Alive!	Various roles	
1995	Who Rules?	Various roles	
1998–1999	SketchCom	Various roles	
1999	Relic Hunter		
2000–2004	The Bobroom		
2006	Girlfriends	Kelly Pitts	Backdoor pilot of The Game
2006–2008	Billable Hours	Robin Howland	
2010	Cashing In	Rebecca Craig	
2013	Wendell & Vinnie		
2014	Hart of Dixie	Melanie LaRue	
2015	Scandal	Gavin's Step-mom	
2018	Chicago Med	Mrs. Paulson	
2021	NCIS	Sienna Michaels	
