= Comedy Inc. =

Comedy Inc. may refer to:

- Comedy Inc. (Australian TV series)
- Comedy Inc. (Canadian TV series)
