= Jennifer Robertson =

Canadian actress, writer, and comedian (b. 1971)

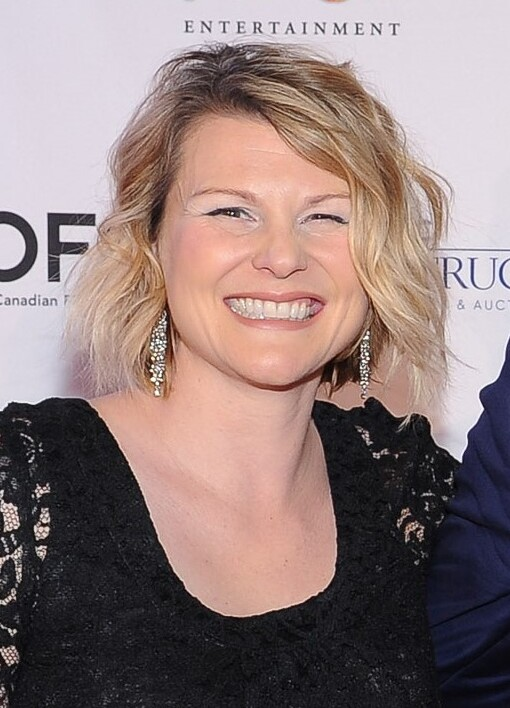
- Robertson in 2016
- Born: November 24, 1971 (age 54); Calgary, Alberta, Canada
- Other name: Jenn Robertson
- Occupations: Actress; writer; comedian
- Years active: 1998–present
- Children: 1

Jennifer Robertson (born November 24, 1971) is a Canadian actress, writer, and comedian. She is known for her role as Jocelyn Schitt in the CBC sitcom Schitt's Creek (2015–2020), for which she won a Screen Actors Guild Award and received nominations for four Canadian Screen Awards.

She has appeared in numerous other shows, including the CBC comedy series This Hour Has 22 Minutes (2003–2004), the CTV sketch comedy series Comedy Inc. (2003–2010), the Disney Channel fantasy film Twitches (2005), the Family Channel teen sitcom Wingin' It (2010–2012), and the Netflix series Ginny & Georgia (2021–present).

== Early life ==
Robertson was born in Canada, the daughter of Bob Robertson who was one half of comedy duo Double Exposure. Raised in Vancouver, British Columbia, she has a brother, Patrick.

== Career ==
Robertson made her acting debut in a 1998 episode of the sketch comedy series SketchCom. She went on to appear in various other television series, including Twice in a Lifetime (2001), Point Blank (2002), The Gavin Crawford Show (2002), and The Seán Cullen Show (2003).

She received further recognition for writing and starring in the comedy series This Hour Has 22 Minutes (2003–2004) and Comedy Inc. (2003–2010).

In 2004, Robertson wrote and starred in the lead role of the television film To Die 4. In 2005, she starred in the Disney Channel made-for-television film Twitches. She went on to appear in other American made-for-television film, including Knights of the South Bronx (2005) and Relative Chaos (2006). She also co-starred as anchorwoman Jennifer Lange in the short-lived Fox News Channel satire comedy series The 1/2 Hour News Hour (2007).

Robertson guest starred as an annoyed flight attendant in the Disney Channel sitcom Hannah Montana (2007), and voiced Tricia in the animated teen comedy series 6teen. She starred as Angela Montclaire in the Family Channel teen sitcom Wingin' It, which aired from April 2010 to May 2012. She portrayed Cece Goldsworthy in the tenth season of the long-running teen drama series Degrassi: The Next Generation (2010–2011). From 2013 to 2014, she hosted the HGTV reality competition series Canada's Handyman Challenge.

Robertson gained further acclaim for her starring role of Jocelyn Schitt, the mayor's wife, in the CBC sitcom Schitt's Creek (2015–2020). For her performance in the series, she earned a nomination for the Screen Actors Guild Award for Outstanding Performance by an Ensemble in a Comedy Series and four Canadian Screen Awards for Best Supporting or Guest Actress in a Comedy.

In 2020, Robertson was cast in one of the lead roles in the Netflix drama series Ginny & Georgia. Robertson stars as Ellen Baker in all ten episodes of the series, which premiered on Netflix on February 24, 2021, and attracted more than 52 million subscribers on the platform. It was subsequently renewed for a second season. Robertson had to learn sign language for her role on the series. After the Season 2 release, Ginny & Georgia was the most-watched title from January to June 2023 on Netflix, with a combined 967.2M hours viewed between Seasons 1 and 2. In May 2023, the series was renewed for a third and fourth season. The third season was released on June 5, 2025.

== Personal life ==
Robertson has one child, a daughter born in 2010, from a previous marriage.

== Filmography ==
=== Film ===
Year	Title	Role	Notes
2004	To Die 4	Lead	Television film; also writer
2005	Twitches	Illeana	Television film
2005	Knights of the South Bronx	Parent #2	Television film
2006	Relative Chaos	Lil Gilbert	Television film
2012	Sassy Pants	Misty	
2016	Valentine Ever After	Molly	Television film
2016	The Big Crush	Donna	Short film
2016	Holiday Joy	Marcie	Television film
2017	Undercover Grandpa	Mrs. Bouchard	
2021	Single All the Way	Lisa	Netflix Film
2022	Hello, Goodbye, And Everything In Between	Nancy	Netflix Film
2022	In Merry Measure	Gretchen	Hallmark Film
2022	Crawlspace	Deputy Jordan Pacer	
2026	Kissing Is the Easy Part	Erin	Tubi Film
2026	Reminders of Him	Ruth	

=== Television ===
Year	Title	Role	Notes
1998	SketchCom	Unknown	Episode: "The Bobroom and Pale by Comparison"; also writer (2 episodes)
2001	Twice in a Lifetime	Infomercial Jean	Episode: "The Choice"
2002	Point Blank	Lady of the House	Episode: "Knockin' on Heaven's Door"; also writer (1 episode)
2002	The Gavin Crawford Show	Alisson	Episode: "Gavin Crawford show"
2002	The Holmes Show	None	Writer (22 episodes)
2003	The Seán Cullen Show	Betty	6 episodes
2003–2004	This Hour Has 22 Minutes	Herself	6 episodes; also writer (6 episodes)
2003–2010	Comedy Inc.	Various	42 episodes; also writer (38 episodes)
2007	Hannah Montana	Flight Attendant	Episode: "I Want You to Want Me... to Go to Florida"
2007	The 1/2 Hour News Hour	Jennifer Lange	17 episodes
2008	Billable Hours	Reporter #1	Episode: "Citizen Clark"
2009	Howie Do It	Herself	Episode #1.5
2010	Cra$h & Burn	Faith	Episode: "Bond Blame Baptize"
2010	The Dating Guy	Miss Tiffany / Golden Lab (voice)	Episode: "Spanking the Monkey"
2010–2011	Degrassi: The Next Generation	Cece Goldsworthy	3 episodes
2010–2012	Wingin' It	Angela Montclaire	51 episodes
2011	Scaredy Squirrel	None	Writer (3 episodes)
2012	Little Mosque on the Prairie	Poppy	4 episodes
2012–2013	Mr. D	Kate	3 episodes
2013	Nikita	Newscaster #3	Episode: "With Fire"
2013	Saving Hope	Becca	Episode: "I Watch Death"
2013–2014	Canada's Handyman Challenge	Herself / Host	19 episodes
2015–2020	Schitt's Creek	Jocelyn Schitt	63 episodes
2017	Disjointed	Susan	Episode: "Donna Weed"
2021–present	Ginny & Georgia	Ellen Baker	28 episodes
2024	The Great Canadian Pottery Throw Down	Host	

== Awards and nominations ==
Year	Award	Category	Work	Result	Ref.
2004	8th Writers Guild of Canada Awards	Best Comedy & Variety	This Hour Has 22 Minutes	Nominated	
2004	19th Gemini Awards	Best Writing in a Comedy or Variety Program or Series	This Hour Has 22 Minutes	Nominated	
2004	5th Canadian Comedy Awards	Television – Pretty Funny Writing – Special or Episode	To Die 4	Nominated	
2006	7th Canadian Comedy Awards	Best Performance by a Female – Film	Twitches	Won	
2006	7th Canadian Comedy Awards	Best Performance by a Female – Television	Comedy Inc.	Nominated	
2007	22nd Gemini Awards	Best Ensemble Performance in a Comedy Program or Series	Comedy Inc.	Nominated	
2016	4th Canadian Screen Awards	Best Supporting or Guest Actress, Comedy	Schitt's Creek	Nominated	
2018	6th Canadian Screen Awards	Best Supporting or Guest Actress, Comedy	Schitt's Creek	Nominated	
2019	7th Canadian Screen Awards	Best Supporting or Guest Actress, Comedy	Schitt's Creek	Nominated	
2019	26th Screen Actors Guild Awards	Outstanding Performance by an Ensemble in a Comedy Series	Schitt's Creek	Nominated	
2020	8th Canadian Screen Awards	Best Supporting or Guest Actress, Comedy	Schitt's Creek	Nominated	
2020	27th Screen Actors Guild Awards	Outstanding Performance by an Ensemble in a Comedy Series	Schitt's Creek	Won	
