= Steve Patterson (comedian) =

Canadian comedian

- Born: Stephen Patterson; Richmond Hill, Ontario
- Notable work: Host and writer in The Debaters

Comedy career
- Years active: 1996–present
- Medium: stand-up
- Genres: Satire, Observational comedy
- Website: stevepatterson.ca

Steve Patterson is a Canadian stand-up comedian, actor, writer, television and radio host. He is also a television producer and known for his satire and observational comedy.

== Career ==
Patterson has been on the comedy circuit full-time since 1996. He draws material from observation of daily/current events and what goes on at the venue during a show. He was first on the stage at the age of 18 on a dare from his dorm mates. However, he spent the next few years away from comedy, as he finished his university degree in business from the University of Western Ontario in London, Ontario. He earned a post-graduate diploma in media copywriting and performed comedy part-time while earning a living as a full-time advertising copywriter from 1994-1996.

Patterson was fired from his copywriting job in 1996. and started performing comedy full-time. Later that year, he joined the touring roster of Canadian comedy booking agency Funny Business, for which he started as the opening act.

In 1999, Patterson got a chance to perform at the Just for Laughs comedy festival in Montreal for the first time. His Irish-influenced set made it possible for him to tour Ireland. Between 1999 and 2004, Patterson performed across Canada, Ireland and the United Kingdom. He also appeared for a few shows in the United States and the United Arab Emirates. In 2004, he made his first Just for Laughs gala appearance. Also in 2004, Patterson performed at the Edinburgh Festival in Edinburgh, Scotland. In 2006, he was the host of the Just for Laughs Road Tour throughout Ontario, and was part of the Just for Laughs festival in Montreal that summer.

In September 2007, Patterson became a host of CBC Radio One's The Debaters, and gained some notoriety in 2007 as being the first comic to say no to Last Comic Standing when he qualified for their Canadian finals in Montreal. He turned down NBC to honour a local show commitment. In July 2010, Patterson performed again at the Just for Laughs comedy festival in Montreal on a Gala hosted by Steve Martin. After his performance, Martin said "If I knew he was going to be THAT good, I would have canceled him."

With growing success as host of The Debaters on CBC Radio One, The Debaters began airing on CBC Television in the fall of 2011 Patterson was nominated for a Gemini Award for his JFL performance, on the Steve Martin Gala, and hosted the Industry Gala in 2011. His success continued that October when he was awarded "Best Male Stand-up" at the Canadian Comedy Awards, an industry event which he also hosted. Publishing rights to Patterson's debut novel, The Book of Letters I Didn't Know Where to Send, were sold to Goose Lane Editions in 2015. Goose Lane published the book in 2016.

== Partial filmography ==
=== Television ===
- Just for Laughs: Montreal Comedy Festival (2001)
- Comedy Now! (1 episode, 2003)
- Halifax Comedy Festival (6 episodes, 2003-2010)
- Stranger at the Door (2004)
- You Bet Your Ass (2006)
- Just for Laughs (2006)
- Great Canadian Laugh Off (2 episodes, 2007-2008)
- CBC Winnipeg Comedy Festival (1 episode, 2008)
- The Debaters (16 episodes, 2011)
- I Wrecked My House (15 episodes, 2014–15)

== Recognition ==
=== Awards and nominations ===
- 2007, Nominated for 'Best Male Stand-up' at the Canadian Comedy Awards
- 2008, Nominated for 'Best Male Stand-up' at the Canadian Comedy Awards
- 2011, Won, 'Best Male Stand-up' at the Canadian Comedy Awards
- 2011, Nominated for Gemini Award for Just for Laughs
- 2013, Won 'Best Male Stand-Up' at the Canadian Comedy Awards

Note: The 2008 winner of 'Best Series Writing' (for The Jon Dore Show) at the Canadian Comedy Awards is a different comedian, actor, writer of the same name, now known as Steve Dylan.
