= Simon King (comedian) =

British comedian

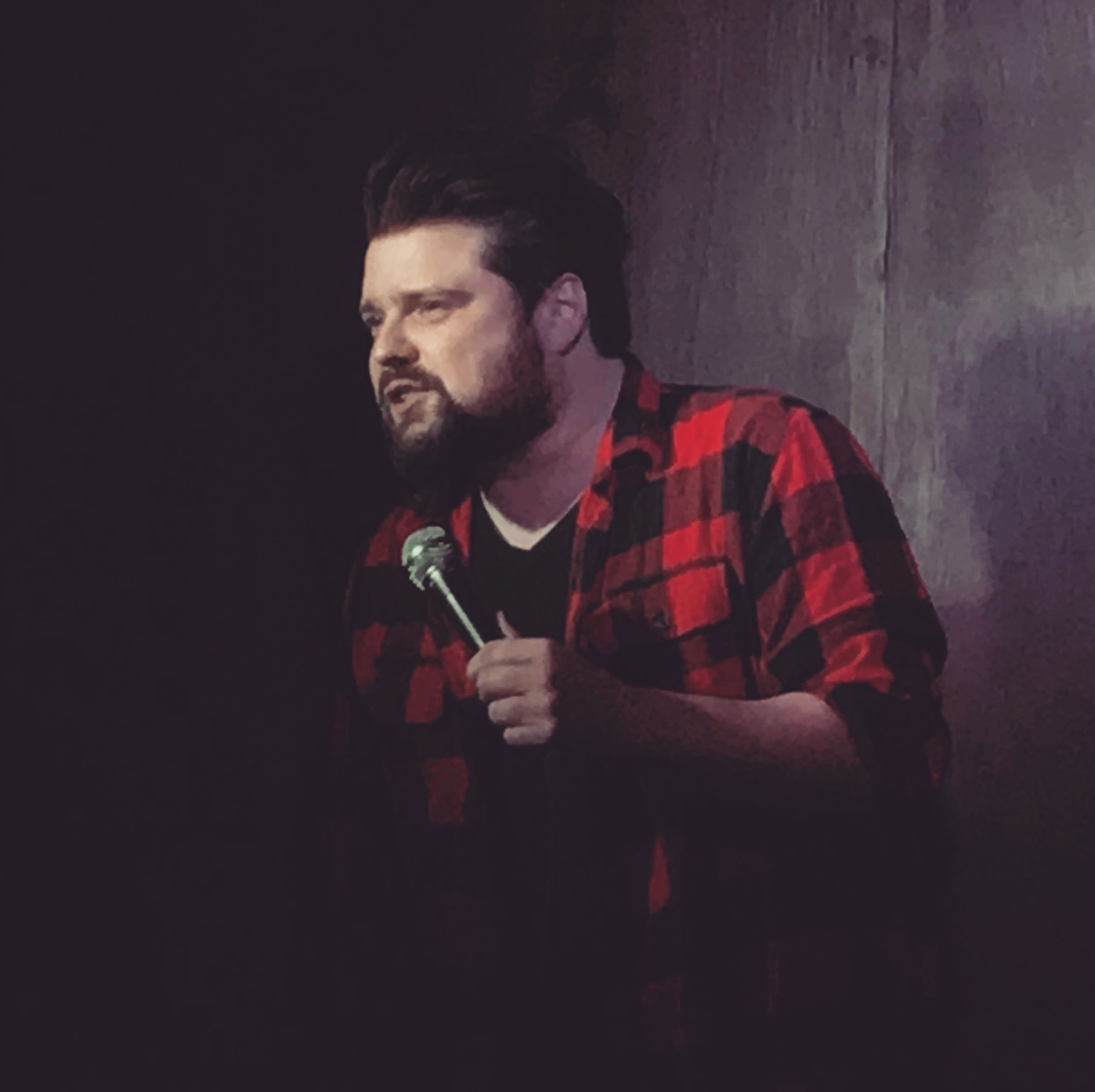
- Born: Simon King; England, United Kingdom
- Notable work: 4 Albums, 4 specials

Comedy career
- Years active: 2000-present
- Medium: Stand-up, Television
- Genres: Stream of consciousness, Improvised, Dark comedy, Observational comedy, Satire/Political satire, Absurd humor, High energy
- Subjects: Current events, Human behavior, Religion, Politics, Social interaction
- Website: thisissimonking.com

Simon King is a stand-up comedian who has performed in the United States, United Kingdom and Canada.

== Early life and personal details ==
King was born to a family with a background in entertainment and moved from the south of England to British Columbia, Canada during his early years. In addition to his work as a stand-up comedian, King has worked in sketch comedy, acting, voice-acting and writing. King has lived in Los Angeles, California, and London, UK, and currently resides in Vancouver, Canada.

== Career ==
King has appeared at several comedy festivals, including the HBO U.S. Comedy Arts Festival, the San Francisco International Comedy Competition, the Seattle International Comedy Competition, Just For Laughs Festival, Vancouver International Comedy Festival, TBS Las Vegas Comedy Festival, and the Winnipeg Comedy Festival as well as others.

His television performances include appearances on the Comedy Network, Comedy Central, CBC, TBS, Amazon, TUBI, Ichannel, Bite TV and CTV. His discography includes:

Unfamous (2010), an album Furious (2016), a comedy special and album One For The Money/Two For The Show (2018), a double album As Good As Or Better Than (2022), an album and special directed by Rory Scovel, a fellow comedian.[1] In film, King played Dave in Tooth Fairy (2010). He also had roles in Little Brother of War (2010) and The Triple Eight (2008). He has appeared in television shows "About a Girl" (2009), "Saved" (2008) and "The Magicians" (2019).

His discography includes:

- Unfamous (2010), an album
- Furious (2016), a comedy special and album
- One For The Money/Two For The Show (2018), a double album
- As Good As Or Better Than (2022), an album and special directed by Rory Scovel, a fellow comedian.

In 2008, King was featured in a one-hour special on the series Comedy Now! broadcast on The Comedy Network and CTV. He also recorded a half-hour special for the No Kidding series on the Toronto-based IChannel in 2013.

Since 2026 Simon has been the narrator for the History Channel reality series Mountain Men: Wild North.
