= Brian Hartt =

Canadian comedian

Brian Hartt is a Canadian comedian and television writer from Winnipeg, Manitoba, most noted as a writer for The Kids in the Hall and Mad TV.

He won a Gemini Award for Individual Performance in a Comedy Program or Series at the 18th Gemini Awards in 2003 for his appearance at the Winnipeg Comedy Festival. As a writer for The Kids in the Hall he received two Gemini nominations for Best Writing in a Comedy or Variety Program or Series at the 9th Gemini Awards in 1995 and the 10th Gemini Awards in 1996, and three Primetime Emmy Award nominations for Outstanding Writing for a Variety Series at the 45th Primetime Emmy Awards in 1993, the 46th Primetime Emmy Awards in 1994, and the 47th Primetime Emmy Awards in 1995.
