= Textuality (film) =

- Poster
- Directed by: Warren P. Sonoda
- Written by: Liam Card
- Produced by: Marc Rigaux
- Starring: Jason Lewis; Carly Pope; Eric McCormack
- Cinematography: Jeremy Benning
- Edited by: Aden Bahadori; Warren P. Sonoda
- Music by: Craig McConnell
- Production company: Strident Films
- Distributed by: Seville Pictures
- Release date: April 22, 2011
- Running time: 95 minutes
- Country: Canada
- Language: English

Textuality is a 2011 Canadian romantic comedy film, directed by Warren P. Sonoda. An exploration of the impact of social media on romance, the film stars Jason Lewis and Carly Pope as Breslin and Simone, a financial advisor and an artist in Toronto who meet and begin to date while each is still navigating multiple casual relationships through e-mail, texting and social networking platforms.

The cast also includes Eric McCormack, Kris Holden-Ried, Kristen Hager, Holly Elissa, Supinder Wraich, Anna Cyzon and Renee Percy.

The film premiered in Toronto in April 2011.

== Critical response ==
The film was not well received by critics. Norman Wilner of Now wrote that "No point mincing words: Textuality is a sorry excuse for a romantic comedy. The characters are one-dimensional, the script is banal, and the social media angle the movie works so hard to establish in its opening reel isn’t even relevant to the plot in the end. In that opening reel, though, Textuality flirts with the notion that texting, Facebooking and blogging push people even further away from engaging with one another in the real world. (It’s nothing Andy Rooney didn’t say about the VCR, the answering machine or the cellular phone back in the day, but it’s still an intriguing idea for a movie.) But this is not that movie. Textuality’s script, written by co-star Liam Card, just rehashes ancient rom-com tropes and throws in a few Twitter references to seem contemporary."

For the National Post, Chris Knight wrote that "The dialogue is deadly. The settings are dreary. Aside from Simone's attractive boudoir, the film features impromptu conversations in a supermarket, on a treadmill, in a change room, at a dinner party, in the bath, after the bath, in a bowling alley and at an art gallery. Of course, some of these conversations also take place over BlackBerrys (hence the film's clever punning title), but the text-message angle adds nothing to the drama." He concluded that "The overall effect of the film is like an independent, lowbudget Sex and the City, only with far less sex and, to be honest, not nearly as much city."

For the Sun Media chain, Liz Braun was more charitable, writing that "Textuality may not rise much above its genre, but the movie does have some laugh out loud moments and a bit of sizzling dialogue." She subsequently called attention to the fact that the movie's best lines all came from Mike, the character played by the film's screenwriter Liam Card.
