= The Holmes Show =

- Genre: Sketch comedy
- Starring: Jessica Holmes; Roman Danylo; Kurt Smeaton
- Country of origin: Canada
- Original language: English
- No. of seasons: 1
- No. of episodes: 22

Production
- Running time: 23 minutes

Original release
- Network: CTV
- Release: September 24, 2002 – January 1, 2003

The Holmes Show is a Canadian television sketch comedy series that premiered on CTV on September 24, 2002. The 22-episode series stars Jessica Holmes, Roman Danylo and Kurt Smeaton. Filming took place at the CTV studios in June and August 2002. Each scene was shot twice with the second scene usually involving more improvisation. Other comedians featured include Raoul Bhaneja, Aurora Browne, James Cunningham, Jane Luk, Winston Spear, Shoshana Sperling and Scott Yaphe.

== See also ==
- Comedy Inc.
- Air Farce Live
