= Supertown Challenge =

Canadian television series

Supertown Challenge was a Canadian comedy series, which aired from 1998 to 2000 on The Comedy Network. A spoof of game shows, the show featured contestants (played by actors) competing in a series of challenges for the right to have their hometown declared Canada's "supertown". Real Canadian communities were used, but the portrayal of them within the series was fictionalized and parodic rather than literal.

The show starred Colin Mochrie as host Dick Powell and Jenny Parsons as judge Gwen Mason. The series was produced by Steve Smith's S&S Productions, and filmed at the studios of CHCH-DT in Hamilton, Ontario.

Bruce Pirrie received two Canadian Comedy Award nominations for Best Direction in a Television Series, at the 1st Canadian Comedy Awards in 2000 and the 2nd Canadian Comedy Awards in 2001.
