= The Bobroom =

The Bobroom was a Canadian sketch comedy troupe, active in the late 1990s and early 2000s. The troupe consisted of Jennifer Baxter, Mike Beaver, Stacey DePass, Jason Jones, Shaun Majumder and Rob Tinkler, and took its name from the Bob Dylan poster on the door to the smoking room in Beaver's apartment.

The troupe performed their first gig at The ALTdot COMedy Lounge in 1997. In 1999 they were featured in an episode of the CBC Television sketch comedy series SketchCom; the following year they received their own one-hour special on The Comedy Network.

In 2004 they premiered a ten-episode sketch comedy series on The Comedy Network, although by this time Majumder had left the troupe. The five remaining members made the series with guest performers David Fujino, Duane Hill, Paul O'Sullivan, Ian Sirota, Winston Spear, Derrick Thompson, Matt Watts and Scott Yaphe.

The troupe received a Canadian Comedy Award nomination for Best Sketch Troupe at the 1st Canadian Comedy Awards in 2000, and the troupe were nominated for Best Writing on a Comedic Special or Episode at the 2nd Canadian Comedy Awards in 2001.
