= John Wing Jr. =

Canadian comedian, author (born 1959)

- Born: August 29, 1959 (age 66); Sarnia, Ontario, Canada
- Occupations: Stand-up comedian; author
- Years active: 1988–present
- Spouse: Dawn Greene (1989)
- Children: Isabel Wing

John Wing Jr. (born 1958 or 1959) is a Canadian stand-up comedian and author from Sarnia, Ontario.

His books include Cup of Nevermind: New Poems (1998), --And the Fear Makes Us Special (2000), None of This is Probably True (2002), Ventriloquism for Dummies: Life as a Comedian (2002), Excuses: Poems (2005), The Winter Palace: New and Selected Poems (2007), So Recently Ancient (2010), Almost Somewhere Else (2012), Why-Shaped Scars (2014), and I'll Be There Soon (2016).

He has been a guest on The Tonight Show with Jay Leno six times, and performed at nine Just For Laughs comedy festivals as well as the TV show Make Me Laugh and the Winnipeg Comedy Festival. Wing also had his own comedy series, Man, Woman and Child, on CBC Radio One in 2006. He was a contestant on America's Got Talent (season 8) in 2013 and was eliminated in the semifinals.

In April 2020, he debuted the podcast The Bad Piano Player, an exploration of American popular music from 1900 to 1960. As of September 2020 there were 24 downloadable episodes available in over 40 countries.

He lives in Los Angeles.
