= Renee Percy =

Canadian actress, writer and comedian (born 1977)

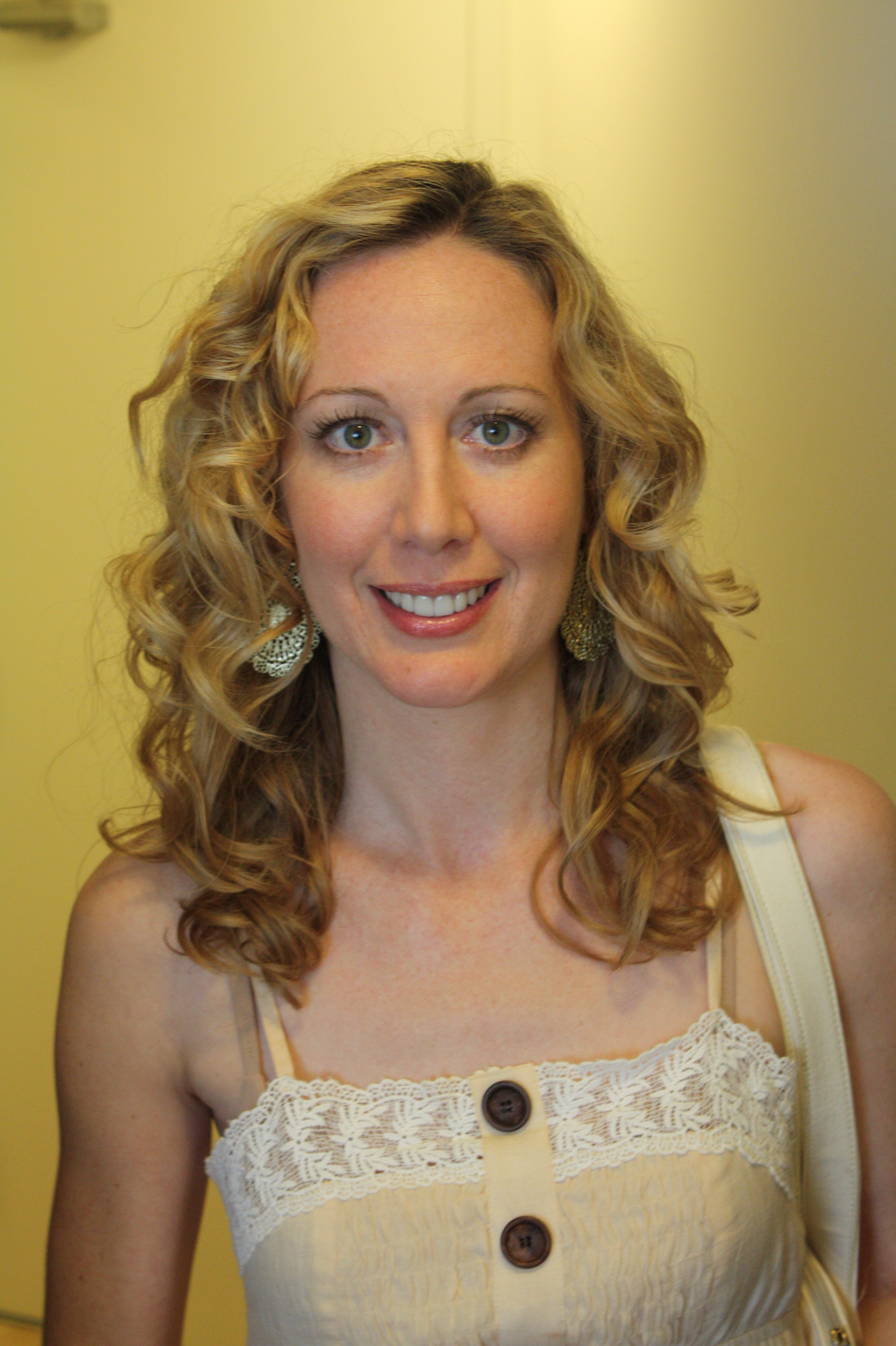
- Born: November 14, 1977 (age 48); Toronto, Ontario, Canada
- Education: Humber College; University of Toronto
- Occupations: Actress; comedian; writer

Renee Percy (born November 14, 1977) is a Canadian actress, writer, and comedian. Percy is best known for her work on the sketch comedy shows Air Farce Live and CTV/Comedy Network's Comedy Inc, and for her Comedy Now! Special "Women of the Night II". Appearing in numerous national television commercials her most notable role is her Canadian Comedy Awards winning viral video "Sure Lock: A True Poo Story".

== Career ==
Percy was born into a family of artists – her mom was a dancer and her dad, a musician. She began her creative path at the Etobicoke School of the Arts and chose acting over dance and karate (she holds a 2nd degree Black Belt). At the age of 10, her mother took her to audition for the Canadian series, Degrassi Junior High. The producers thought she was too young and was eventually cast as Pipi on Degrassi High two years later. After Degrassi, Percy was accepted into the University of Toronto Honors Program with a Specialty in Drama and Minor in English. Further, Percy auditioned and was accepted for the department's Master Class. After graduation the class went on to tour with the school's visiting German Director Norbert Kentrup on a 12 stop European tour. Percy began stand-up at the Lab Cab Factory Theatre and went on to tour across Canada with the world's largest chain of comedy clubs, Yuk Yuk's. Percy attended the Humber College School of Comedy's post graduate program where she won the Mark Breslin Scholarship and the Phil Hartman Award for Best Comedian. Her sketch show "Mardi Bra" was named one of Now Magazine's "Best Comedic Discoveries" of 2004, which was staged at the Toronto Fringe Festival.

Her credits have included the films Textuality and Eat Wheaties!, as well as supporting or guest roles in television series.

Percy also claims the title of being the only female staff writer to be hired by Canada's most successful television comedy series Air Farce Live, in addition to writing for Canada's other national sketch comedy show Comedy Inc.. She has also appeared on CTV/Comedy Network in the Comedy Now! special Women of the Night, and as a series regular on Comedy Inc. She is also a writer and voice actor on the animated sketch show pilot Duncebucket on Teletoon.

== Awards ==
Winner of the Phil Hartman Award For Comedy.

Winner of a Canadian Comedy Awards for "Sure Lock: A True Poo Story"
