= Billable Hours =

- Genre: Legal drama Comedy
- Created by: Fabrizio Filippo; Adam Till
- Starring: Fabrizio Filippo; Brandon Firla; Jennifer Baxter
- Opening theme: "Working Man"
- Ending theme: "Working Man" (instrumental)
- Country of origin: Canada
- Original language: English
- No. of seasons: 3
- No. of episodes: 26

Production
- Executive producers: Frank Van Keeken; David Fortier; Ivan Schneeberg
- Production locations: Toronto, Ontario, Canada
- Running time: 30 minutes
- Production companies: Temple Street Productions; Shaw Media

Original release
- Network: Showcase
- Release: April 16, 2006 – December 3, 2008

Billable Hours is a Canadian comedy series that aired on Showcase from 2006 to 2008. Set in the fictional Toronto law firm of Fagen & Harrison, the series focuses on three young lawyers struggling to balance their expectations of life with the difficult realities of building a career in the driven Bay Street corporate environment, and engaging in immature and unprofessional behaviour to cope with the soul-crushing drudgery of working life.

The series was created by Adam Till, a former lawyer who quit law after becoming disillusioned with the corporate environment, and actor Fabrizio Filippo.

== Production ==
The first season was filmed in a real Bay Street office building, in offices recently vacated by a real law firm. The space was taken over by another company by the time the second season went into production, however, and with no suitable new office space available Temple Street was forced to build a new office set in its own studios.

== Broadcast ==
The series debuted on Showcase in 2006, and was produced by Temple Street Productions. Its first episode received what was at the time the channel's highest ratings for an original series premiere. The second season premiered in April 2007, and was accompanied by a 10-part webisode series entitled Billable Minutes. The third season of the show premiered in October 2008.

The series ended on December 3, 2008. The series also received a second-window broadcast on the terrestrial Global television network.

In Australia, the series premiered on ABC2 in August 2009, with all three seasons airing as one continuous run.

== Awards ==
At the 23rd Gemini Awards in 2008, the series received nominations for Best Ensemble Performance in a Comedy Program or Series for the episode "Monopoly Man", and Best Writing in a Comedy or Variety Program or Series for the episode "One Hit Wonder". At the 24th Gemini Awards in 2009, the series won the awards for Best Writing in a Comedy or Variety Program or Series for the episode "A Manson for All Seasons", and Best Sound in a Comedy, Variety, or Performing Arts Program or Series for the episode "Pigeon Lawyer".

== Cast ==
- Brandon Firla as Clark Claxton III
- Fabrizio Filippo as Sam Caponelli
- Jennifer Baxter as Robin Howland
- Dov Tiefenbach as Stu Berger
- Jane Luk as Cam Belter, office manager
- Aron Tager as Mortie Fagen, head partner
- Ennis Esmer as Zoltan
- Mike Beaver as Murray Stipple
- Ron Gabriel as Seth Kaplin, managing partner
- Jayne Eastwood as Maxine Bingly
- Robin Brûlé as Millie Larkin, Clark's assistant
- Arnold Pinnock as Vic Laghm

== Episodes ==
=== Season 1 (2006) ===
No. overall	No. in season	Title	Directed by	Written by	Original release date
1	1	"The Nicotine Gum"	Ron Oliver	Fabrizio Filippo & Adam Till	April 16, 2006
Sam's high school bully, now a prominent actor, visits the firm to research a role.
2	2	"The Parking Spot"	Adam Weissman	Adam Till & Fabrizio Filippo	April 23, 2006
Sam and Clark battle for a parking spot while Robin has relationship troubles.
3	3	"The Jewish Holiday"	Bradley Walsh	Adam Till & Fabrizio Filippo	April 30, 2006
Sam and Clark compete for religious favouritism while Stu tries to win Robin's affection.
4	4	"The Jedi Mind Trick"	Ron Oliver	Fabrizio Filippo & Adam Till	May 7, 2006
Sam uses the Jedi mind trick on his colleagues and thwarts Clark's attempts to acquire a new office chair. Robin tries to convince a partner of her worth.
5	5	"The Foosball"	Bradley Walsh	Adam Till & Fabrizio Filippo	May 14, 2006
Robin's boyfriend Tim dies before she has a chance to break-up with him. Sam and Clark convert Tim's office to host their foosball tournament -- best 50 of 99 games.
6	6	"The Handicapped Bathroom"	Adam Weissman	Fabrizio Filippo & Adam Till	May 21, 2006
Clark convinces Sam to use the handicapped bathroom. Sam gets interrupted thinking Clark is playing a prank, in return opening the door and cursing to find out it is Fagen's young disabled nephew. Sam in return is sent to counseling on a lower floor. Fagen's nephew becomes lustful towards Robin.
7	7	"The Chocolate-Covered Almonds"	Ron Oliver	Adam Till & Fabrizio Filippo	May 28, 2006
Sam buys chocolate-covered almonds from a secretary who is selling them on behalf of her daughters fund-raiser, while constantly having to give them away due to every female co-workers astonishment towards them. Clark and Sam compete to win the affection of a Spanish custodian who is fed up of cleaning after Fagen's dog. Robin becomes worried after having a dream with a possible sexual meaning that involved Sam.
8	8	"The Strip Club"	Bradley Walsh	Fabrizio Filippo & Adam Till	June 4, 2006
The mutually disliked man named Murray is new to the office. He announces he is going to be married Sam feels obligated to host a bachelor party, at the local strip club.

=== Season 2 (2007) ===
No. overall	No. in season	Title	Directed by	Written by	Original release date
9	1	"Birthday Suits"	Shawn Thompson	Fabrizio Filippo & Adam Till	April 22, 2007
Robin is depressed on her birthday, even after Murray throws her a surprise party. Sam loses big to Fagen in a poker game.
10	2	"Cancer, Baby!"	Ron Murphy	Matt MacLennan	April 29, 2007
When it is rumored that Robin is pregnant, she decides to pretend that it is Clark's baby to check out the firm's maternity package. Meanwhile, Sam pretends to have cancer.
11	3	"15 Minutes of Shame"	Paul Fox	Adam Reid, Max Reid	May 6, 2007
Sam is chosen as the legal news presenter for a business-oriented TV show. Robin is revealed to be a former movie "scream queen".
12	4	"Corporate Retreat"	Shawn Thompson	Fabrizio Filippo & Adam Till	May 13, 2007
It's time for the firm's annual spiritual retreat.
13	5	"One Hit Wonder"	Paul Fox	Adam Reid & Max Reid	May 20, 2007
After Clark turns a boring story of Sam's into a hit one-liner, Sam tries to do the same. Meanwhile, Robin pretends to be an alcoholic so she can use AA for networking.
14	6	"The Sting"	Ron Murphy	Fabrizio Filippo & Adam Till	May 27, 2007
Clark seeks revenge on the wasp that stung him, while Sam tries to protect it. Meanwhile, Robin uncovers a secretarial plot after declining to contribute money for a baby-shower gift.
15	7	"Peer Review"	Chris Grismer	Adam Till & Fabrizio Filippo	June 3, 2007
Robin's displeasure at the peer review she got from Clark escalates into a prank war. Meanwhile, when Sam doesn't receive any such evaluation, he worries that he's about to be fired.
16	8	"Lunch Stealers"	Chris Grismer	Sarah Glinski	June 10, 2007
Clark tries to find out who is stealing his lunch. Meanwhile, Robin tries to prove to Sam and Clark that she does not hate other women, and Sam loses his office to Vic.
17	9	"Monopoly Man, II"	Thom Best	Matt MacLennan	June 17, 2007
Sam tries to motivate Clark by getting him a pet hamster, but the office is unprepared for the emotions that are released. Meanwhile, Robin tries to write a children's book.
18	10	"Killer Comma"	David Wharnsby	Sarah Glinski	June 24, 2007
A medical evaluation makes Clark think he is going to die soon. Meanwhile, while playing hide and seek in the heating vents, Sam overhears news about a problem with a major company deal.

=== Season 3 (2008) ===
No. overall	No. in season	Title	Directed by	Written by	Original release date
19	1	"My Millie For a Muffin"	Thom Best	Fabrizio Filippo & Adam Till	October 15, 2008
In an effort to win a $500 bet made with Clark, Sam weasels a deal with Maxine. Clark decides that his food cravings are unbearable and hastily trades Millie for a snack. Robin finds it impossible to concentrate without the usual noises around the office.
20	2	"Shortstop"	Don McCutcheon	Mark Steinberg	October 22, 2008
When a new firewall threatens the sanity of everyone at Fagen & Harrison, Sam befriends the I.T guys, Stacey and Keach. After discovering that she has a powerful pitch, Robin joins the firm's softball team.
21	3	"Lil' War Photo"	Ron Murphy	Emer Connon & Kyle Muir	October 29, 2008
After dropping Fagen's prized war photo into an aquarium, Robin attempts to remedy the situation by recreating the photo with the help of Sam. Meanwhile Clark, deals with a crisis of his own when he is exposed in the company calendar.
22	4	"Pigeon Lawyer"	Paul Fox	Fabrizio Filippo & Adam Till	November 5, 2008
When Robin refuses to turn over a joint to Clark for his enjoyment, Clark retaliates by telling Kaplan that Robin has a drug problem. Instead of reprimanding Robin for her drug use, Kaplan mistakes Robin for a dealer, asking her to hook him up. Sam is forced to dress up in a pigeon costume for Fagen's Children's Charity.
23	5	"Citizen Clark"	Ron Murphy	Fabrizio Filippo & Adam Till	November 12, 2008
Clark returns home from a holiday to discover that his father has entered him in the electioneering for City Council. His campaign hits a snag when his opponent starts a smear campaign. Determined to win, Clark pretends to be gay to get media attention and community support.
24	6	"Creepy Artwork"	Chris Grismer	Fabrizio Filippo & Adam Till	November 19, 2008
After hearing that Sam wasn't happy with his office artwork, Vic generously gives him some artwork of his own, forcing Sam to feign a profound appreciation of the borrowed art. Fagen and Harrison initiates mandatory lie detector testing for all its employees, resulting in Sam and Clark learning some surprising news about Robin.
25	7	"A Manson For All Seasons"	Shawn Thompson	Adam Reid, Max Reid	November 26, 2008
Tired of watching men get promoted over her, Robin invents a fictitious male lawyer, Allen McBeal. Sam is ecstatic when film producer Leonard St. Cross wants to make his movie, but has second thoughts when the film begins to move in a more adult direction.
26	8	"Insane in the Membrane"	Fabrizio Filippo	Adam Reid, Max Reid	December 3, 2008
Having never had the chicken pox, Clark tries and fails to quarantine himself when an outbreak reaches employees at Fagen and Harrison. Robin looks forward to the tropical vacation she's been awarded for billing the most hours at the firm, but is unpleasantly surprised when she gets excessive roasting, to which she responds by aggressively insulting everyone. Next day, everyone acts nicely to her despite her outburst last night because Sam "fixed" it by making up a story that she has mental health issues. Seth Kaplin plays along with that ruse, which escalates with Robin getting involuntarily committed to a mental hospital and put in a straitjacket and a padded cell.

== Notes ==
- In the opening of the episode 201, "Birthday Suits", a lawyer attempts to demonstrate the strength of the office building windows by throwing himself against one of them, but the window shatters and he falls to his death. Such an incident actually took place in a Toronto law firm in 1993. The plot device of falling through a shattered skyscraper window also figures prominently in the Canadian film waydowntown, starring series co-creator Fab Filippo.
- In episode 203, "15 Minutes of Shame", it is discovered that Robin played a zombie in a low-rent horror movie. This was a joke referencing Jennifer Baxter's 2005 appearance as a zombie in George Romero's Land of the Dead.
