= Glen Foster (comedian) =

Canadian stand-up comedian

Glen Foster is a Canadian stand-up comedian. He is most noted for That Canadian Guy, his 2001 episode of the stand-up comedy performance series Comedy Now!, for which he received a Gemini Award nomination for Best Individual Performance in a Comedy Program or Series at the 16th Gemini Awards, and a Canadian Comedy Award nomination for Best Writing in a Television Special or Episode at the 2nd Canadian Comedy Awards.

Foster was born in Montreal, Quebec, and raised in Cambridge, Ontario. He began his comedy career in the 1980s as a regular performer at Yuk Yuk's, later expanding into national touring, and released his debut comedy album Overworked and Underlaid in 1996. He has since also released the albums Half a Double CD (2010), Prickly (2012) and Unchecked (2021).

He is a two-time Canadian Comedy Award nominee for Best Male Stand-Up, receiving nods at the 6th Canadian Comedy Awards in 2005 and the 10th Canadian Comedy Awards in 2009.

In 2019 he collaborated with a musician from Nanaimo, British Columbia, whose name was also Glen Foster, on the title track for the musician's EP Party Out There Tonight. The two men had previously performed together in a mixed comedy-music show billed as The Glen Fosters Experience.
