= Mark Forward =

Canadian comedian (b. 1974)

- Born: June 17, 1974 (age 51); Oakville, Ontario, Canada
- Website: www.markforward.com

Mark Forward (born June 17, 1974) is a Canadian comedian and actor from Oakville, Ontario.

He is the winner of the 2005 Canadian Comedy Award for Best Stand-up Newcomer. He also won the Homegrown Competition at the 2006 Just for Laughs festival. He has performed at the Halifax Comedy Festival, Hub Cap Comedy Festival and Just for Laughs, opening for Craig Ferguson during his Hobo Fabulous tour.

He has appeared in Letterkenny, Fargo, Mr. D, The Rocker, Breakfast with Scot, The Sean Cullen Show, The Newsroom and Degrassi. Forward is also a writer and performer on The Jon Dore Television Show.

== Filmography ==
=== Standup Specials ===
Year	Title	Notes
2018	Mark Forward Presents: Mark Forward	
2019	Mark Forward Wins All the Awards	
2026	Mark Forward Presents: Safari Time	

=== Film ===
Year	Title	Role	Notes
2002	Escape from the Newsroom	The Cannibal	
2006	Night of Terror	Newlywed Man	
2007	I Me Wed	Jim	
2007	Breakfast with Scot	Snickering Businessman	
2008	The Rocker	Leon	
2008	True Confessions of a Hollywood Starlet	Ice Cream Vendor	
2009	Puck Hogs	Jake Goldstein	
2010	Double Wedding	Mitch	
2015	No Stranger Than Love	Vernon Paulson	
2016	The Death (and Life) of Carl Naardlinger	Don Beamershmiddle; Carl Naardlinger	
2020	Getting to Know You	Kenny	

=== Television ===
Year	Title	Role	Notes
2002	Doc	Jake	1 episode
2003	The Seán Cullen Show	Seán's stand-in	
2007	Degrassi: The Next Generation	Judge #1	1 episode
2007-09	The Jon Dore Television Show	Various	8 episodes
2010	Living in Your Car		1 episode
2012-14	Mr. D	Wayne Leung	24 episodes; 1 episode in 2014 in the "webisodes" spinoff
2015	Spun Out	Ian Hayes	1 episode
2016-2023	Letterkenny	Coach	32 episodes
2017	Fargo	Donny Mashman	6 episodes
2018-2019	Cupcake & Dino: General Services	Hugo (voice)	13 episodes

== Personal life ==
Forward lives in Toronto. He is married and has a son.
