= Ian Sirota =

Canadian stand-up and sketch comedian

Ian Sirota is a Canadian stand-up and sketch comedian, who was a cast member of the television sketch series Comedy Inc. in the 2000s.

A native of Montreal, Quebec, Sirota began his comedy career as a solo stand-up comedian, before becoming known as a member of the stage sketch troupe The Blockheads with Mimi Holmes, Johnny Gardhouse and Suzanne Muir. The troupe gained their first widespread publicity in 1995 when they pranked talk show host Jerry Springer, appearing on an episode devoted to the theme "My Husband Slept With the Babysitter" by pretending to be people in that situation but in fact essentially improvising their dialogue. Springer subsequently sued the troupe to recoup the cost of producing the ruined episode, but the suit was settled out of court.

He was also a writer for the Comedy Network game show Gutterball Alley, and an occasional guest performer on The Bobroom, and has continued to perform standup.

He received a Gemini Award nomination for Best Individual Performance in a Comedy Program or Series at the 23rd Gemini Awards in 2008, for Comedy Inc. The full cast, including Sirota, were nominated for Best Ensemble Performance in a Comedy Program or Series at the 22nd Gemini Awards the previous year.
