= Roman Danylo =

Canadian comedian

Roman Danylo is a Canadian comedian, improviser and actor based out of Vancouver, British Columbia. He is best known for his starring role in the CTV Television Network show Comedy Inc..

== Career ==
Danylo was born in Calgary, Alberta.

As a teen, Danylo ran a weekly sketch review show as a student at Sir Winston Churchill High School in Calgary.

Roman then went on to study with Keith Johnstone at the Loose Moose Theatre in Calgary (Loose Moose is where Theatresports originated and is often credited as being one of the founding institutions of humorous improvisational theatre). He also worked in several local comedy clubs with friends Oldring, Albert Howell and Graeme Davies and performed with Theatre Calgary. He participated in various CBC Radio dramas as well.

He has performed at the HBO Comedy Festival in Aspen, Colorado and Montreal's Just for Laughs Festival and also starred in the UPN series Off Limits with Aisha Tyler. Danylo has been featured on NBC's Late Friday, Jeremiah, The Outer Limits and Sliders.

However, Roman is best known in Canada and has appeared in several Canadian series, including CBC's Comics, These Arms of Mine, Made in Canada with Rick Mercer, the Just For Laughs Improv Championships, Slightly Bent on The Comedy Network and Corner Gas on CTV with Brent Butt.

In 2002, Danylo joined fellow comedians Jessica Holmes and Kurt Smeaton as a writer and cast member on The Holmes Show. Following the show's cancellation, he was offered a starring role in Comedy Inc. while he was in Los Angeles during pilot season.

Some of his recurring characters include "Vlad, the Russian Romantic", "Tantric Sex Master" and "Ken Shawn of WFTO-TV News" (usually paired with Nikki Payne as WFTO's long-suffering weathergirl).

Co-stars on Comedy Inc. include Aurora Browne, Jen Goodhue, Terry McGurrin, Winston Spear, Jenn Robertson, Gavin Stephens, Ian Sirota and Albert Howell. The series recently won the Gold Medal Award for "Best TV Variety Program" at the New York Festivals for the second year in a row and was picked up by the U.S. cable network Spike TV in April 2005. Comedy Inc. was also nominated for a 2006 Canadian Comedy Award for best writing in a television series.

In 2012 he hosted a gag-comedy show called the Funny Pit with Ryan Steele and Amy Goodmurphy, which was produced by Thunderbird Films.

For his performance in CBC's Western Alienation Comedy Hour, Roman won a Leo Award in 2004 for excellence in British Columbia film and television. That same year, he was nominated for a Gemini for his work on Comedy Inc..

Danylo also performs with the Canadian improv troupe Urban Improv in Vancouver.

== Selected filmography ==
| Year | Title | Character | Notes |
|---|---|---|---|
| 2012 | The Funny Pit | Host | TV series |
| 2002 to 2007 | Comedy Inc. | Various | TV series |
| 2002 | Jeremiah | Captain Iron / John | TV Series, 1 episode: S01E3 "Man of Iron, Woman Under Glass" |
| 2002 | The Holmes Show | Various | TV series |
| 2001 | Seeking Winonas | Smart Guy | Film |
| 2000 | Improv Comedy Games | Host | TV mini-series |
| 2000 | Duets | Albuquerque Desk Clerk | Film |
| 2000 | Happy Birthday | The Boyfriend | Film |
| 1999 | 10,000 Delusions | Jehovah's Witness | Short film |
| 1999 | Babette's Feet | Man Eating Sushi | Short film |
| 1998 | The Improv Comedy Olympics | Comedi | TV specialan |
| 1997 | Free Willy 3: The Rescue | Pizza Kid | Film |
| 1997 | Super Dave's All Stars | Cheerleader | TV series |
| 1995 | The Inner Voice | Sy | Film |
| 1995 | The Omen | Bob | TV pilot |
