= SketchCom =

Canadian television series

- Genre: Sketch comedy
- Country of origin: Canada
- Original language: English
- No. of seasons: 1
- No. of episodes: 13

Production
- Producers: Roger Abbott; Don Ferguson
- Running time: 30 minutes (time slot)

Original release
- Network: CBC
- Release: 5 October 1998 – 1 February 1999

SketchCom is a 1998 Canadian sketch comedy television series created by Roger Abbott and Don Ferguson of the Royal Canadian Air Farce. The series aired on Monday evenings, 7:30 pm in most time zones.

The first of the series' 13 episodes aired 5 October 1998 and aired most weeks until early 1999. Different sketch performers were featured in each episode. CBC did not renew SketchCom for the 1999-2000 television season.

Program funding included contributions from Bell Canada's Broadcast and New Media Fund and the Canadian Television Fund.

== Episodes and guest performers ==
Original air dates of selected episodes, with guests:

- 5 October 1998 – debut
- 26 October 1998 – Corky and the Juice Pigs
- 2 November 1998 – Illustrated Men (David Huband, Bruce Hunter and Adrian Truss)
- 11 January 1999 – Fred's Bicycle Repair Shop and Urban Myth
- 25 January 1999 – The Stand-Ins, The Bobroom
- 1 February 1999 – Fast and Dirty
