= Jon Dore =

Canadian comedian and actor

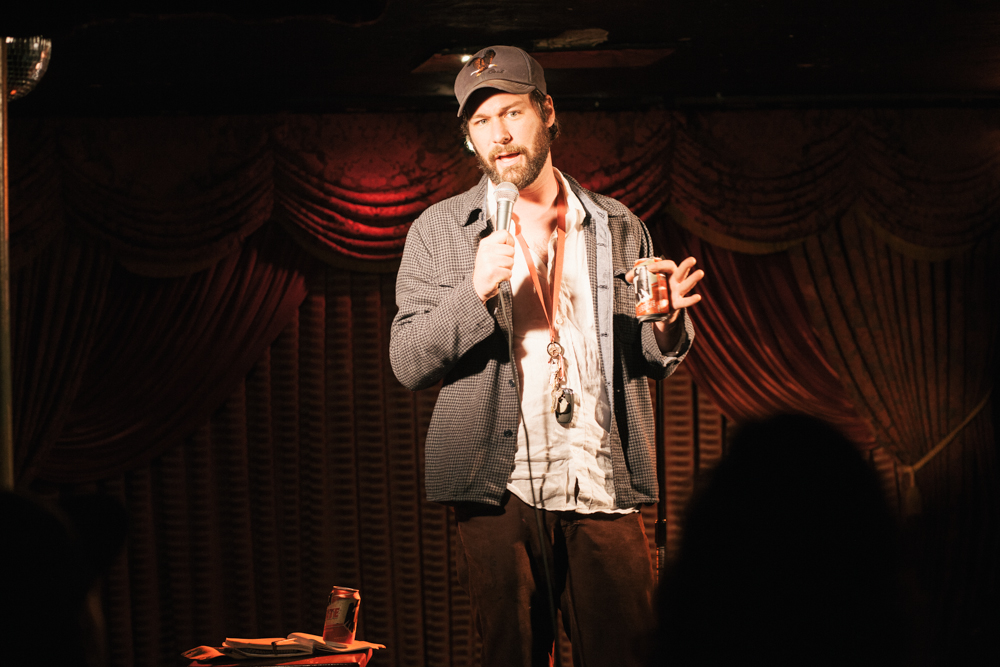
- Dore in 2013.
- Born: Jonathan David Dore; November 2, 1975 (age 50); Ottawa, Ontario, Canada
- Occupations: Actor, comedian

Jonathan David Dore (born November 2, 1975) is a Canadian comedian and actor.

== Education ==
Dore attended Brookfield High School and studied broadcasting at Algonquin College in Ottawa.

== Career ==
Jon Dore was formerly a correspondent for CTV's Canadian Idol. Dore also appeared on his own Comedy Now! special for CTV and The Comedy Network, and was featured on the A Channel's comedy special Toronto Laughs. His show, The Jon Dore Television Show, can be seen on The Comedy Network in Canada, and on the Independent Film Channel in the United States. In July 2008, Dore appeared on Comedy Central's stand-up show, Live at Gotham along with several other comedians. In 2010, he appeared on the CBS sitcom How I Met Your Mother.

In March 2011, he hosted Funny as Hell on HBO Canada, a show featuring alternative or musical comedy acts. Season 3 of Funny as Hell premiered on March 22, 2013.

On November 11, 2010, he was the first featured comedian on Conan.

In 2013, Dore appeared as a main cast member alongside Sarah Chalke and Brad Garrett on the short-lived sitcom How to Live with Your Parents (For the Rest of Your Life) and was interviewed by Melinda Hill for the web series All Growz Up with Melinda Hill.

Dore went on tour with Tig Notaro in the Summer of 2013 across the country to film a stand-up documentary for Showtime.

In 2014, he appeared in an uncredited cameo on Alan Thicke's TLC show Unusually Thicke as a drunken stranger who crashes 16-year-old Carter Thicke's party. That same year he appeared in two episodes of Comedy Central's Inside Amy Schumer.

In 2021, Dore created the single-camera sitcom Humour Resources for CBC, playing a fictional version of himself as an HR manager with unscripted interviews with Canadian and American comedians.

== Awards ==
Year	Award	Category	Result
2006	Canadian Comedy Award	Best Stand-up Newcomer	Won
2008	Canadian Comedy Award	Best Series Writing, The Jon Dore TV Show	Won
2009	Canadian Comedy Award	Best Performance (male), The Jon Dore TV Show	Won
2023	Juno Awards	Comedy Album of the Year — A Person Who Is Gingerbread	Won

== Filmography ==
- Canadian Idol (2003) – Correspondent
- A Woman Hunted (2003) – TV Host
- Outrage (2003) – Birnbaum
- Canadian Idol 2 (2004) – Correspondent
- Cream of Comedy (2005) – Host/Writer
- Naturally, Sadie (2006) – Mr. Woodson
- Canadian Comedy Awards: Weekend Wrap-Up (2006) – Himself
- 7th Canadian Comedy Awards (2006) – Himself
- Comedy Now! (2007) – Himself/Writer
- The Jon Dore Television Show (2007–2009) – Himself/Creator/Writer/Co-producer
- The Nice Show (2007) – Himself/Performer/Writer
- Hooked on Speedman (2008) – Jon
- Live at Gotham (2008) – Himself
- CH Live: NYC (2009) – Himself/Writer
- Hotbox (2009)
- Just for Laughs (2009) – Himself/Writer
- 10th Canadian Comedy Awards (2009) – Himself
- Winnipeg Comedy Festival (2010) – Himself
- 11th Canadian Comedy Awards (2010) – Himself
- Global Comedians (2010) – Himself
- Held Up (2010) – Ray
- Comedy Central Presents (2010) – Himself/Writer
- How I Met Your Mother (2010) – Mugger/Zookeeper
- Scare Tactics (2010) – Freakshow Owner
- Conan (2010–2017) – Himself (7 episodes)
- The Hour (2011) – Himself
- Stag (2011) – Luke
- Talking Hedz (2011)
- My Life As an Experiment (2011) – A.J. Wilder
- Winnipeg Comedy Festival (2012) – Writer
- Funny as Hell (2011–2013) – Host/Writer
- CC: Stand-Up - The Bonnaroo Experience (2012) – Himself
- Mash Up w/ TJ Miller (2011–2012) – Himself/Writer
- Just for Laughs: All-Access (2012) – Himself
- Dino Dan (2011) – Recurring guest Uncle Jack
- All Growz Up with Melinda Hill (2013) – Himself
- Expecting (2013) – Peter
- Set List: Stand Up Without a Net (2013) – Himself
- Who Charted? (2013) – Himself
- How to Live with Your Parents (2013) – Julian Tatham
- This Hour Has 22 Minutes (2014) – Himself
- Katie Chats (2014) – Himself
- Hart of Dixie (2014) – Charles (3 episodes)
- Unusually Thicke (2014) – Jon
- Package Deal (2014) – TJ
- A Dore to Winnipeg (2014) – Himself/Writer/Co-executive producer
- Kroll Show (2014–2015) – Gordon Yarmouth/Quentin Brian (2 episodes)
- Inside Amy Schumer (2014–2015) – Ted/Boyfriend/Max (3 episodes)
- Teen Lust (2014) – Gary
- @midnight (2014–2016) – Himself
- Bummed – (2015) – Billy Sunshine
- Knock Knock, It's Tig Notaro (2015)
- Comedy Bang! Bang! (2015) – Olie "The Goaltender" Marcoux
- After the Reality (2016) – Fitz/Co-producer
- The Pickle Recipe (2016) – Joey
- Angel from Hell (2016) – Hank (2 episodes)
- Speechless (2016) – Tom
- Those Who Can't (2016) – Dave
- The Crossroads of History (2016)
- Baroness von Sketch Show (2016–2018) – Mr. Bingleby/Pete/Henry/Jack/Bouncer/Lance (6 episodes)
- The 5th Quarter (2018) – Otis Wood
- Seven Stages to Achieve Eternal Bliss By Passing Through the Gateway Chosen By the Holy Storsh (2018) – Tony
- Cracked (2018) – Dr. Max Nolan/Writer/Executive producer
- Big Questions, Huge Answers with Jon Dore (2018) – Himself
- Humour Resources (2021) – Jon Dore
- The Lake (2022) – Wayne
- The Holiday Shift (2023) – Brian
