= Jeff McEnery =

Canadian stand-up comedian and actor

Jeff McEnery is a stand-up comedian and actor born and raised in the small town of Acton, Ontario, Canada.

He is a graduate of Humber College's Comedy: Writing and Performance Program. In 2004, he won the college's Best First Year Stand-Up Award. He won the Tim Sims Encouragement Award in 2005 and Yuk Yuk's $25,000 Great Canadian Laugh Off in 2006. He was nominated twice for the Best Stand-Up Newcomer Canadian Comedy Award (2006–2007), winning in 2007. Since then, McEnery has appeared at every major Canadian comedy festival including the "Just for Laughs Comedy Festival", "Halifax Comedy Festival", "Winnipeg Comedy Festival", "LOLSudbury Comedy Festival", "Hubcap Comedy Festival" in Moncton, "Cottage Country Comedy Festival" in Muskoka and "Global ComedyFest" in Vancouver.

McEnery's one-hour Comedy Now! stand up special was broadcast on CTV and The Comedy Network in the summer of 2011 and he has been featured on the shows, George Stroumboulopoulos Tonight and eTalk. He was nominated for the Best Male Stand Up Canadian Comedy Award in 2015. In December 2015, he released his first solo comedy album Sunset Acres.

McEnery has also been involved in acting, starring in the feature films Dog Pound and Camille. He has made guest appearances on the shows Letterkenny, Murdoch Mysteries, Covert Affairs, The Jon Dore Television Show and Naturally, Sadie. He was also a cast member on The Comedy Network's sketch series Hotbox.

As a writer, McEnery is a graduate of the Vancouver Film School's Writing for Film and Television Program. He was a story consultant on the CBC's Still Standing and did punch up work on The Latest Buzz. He has written and produced two short films Yes And... and Behind the Funny, the latter of which was broadcast on The Comedy Network on the show Canadian Comedy Shorts.
