= Martha Chaves =

Nicaraguan-Canadian comedian, actress, activist and playwright

- Born: Nicaragua
- Education: Concordia University
- Occupations: Comedian, actress, playwright
- Years active: 1995–present

Martha Chaves is a Nicaraguan-Canadian comedian, actress, activist and playwright. She performs standup in English, Spanish, French and Italian. She is a regular in the comedy circuits in Canada, the United States and Latin America, at Just for Laughs and other major festivals, and on CBC Radio.

Since coming out around 2009, Chaves has spoken out for the LGBT community and has become known for her comedic take on being a homosexual person of colour in Canada. She has also written and performed in a series of one-woman plays. Chaves won the Canadian Comedy Award for Best Standup Comic of 2017, after being nominated several times in the previous decade.

== Early life and education ==
Chaves was born in Nicaragua where she grew up under the Somoza dictatorship. Her parents were lawyers. Chaves's family home was destroyed in the 1972 Nicaragua earthquake. At 17, she was sent to Canada to study at Concordia University in Montreal, Quebec.

Her family fled from the Contra War, fearing that her younger brothers would be forced to fight in the army. Her parents and three younger siblings became refugees in Guatemala where her father died two years later. Chaves was unable to return to Nicaragua or reunite with her family in Guatemala, and so became a stateless refugee in Canada when her student visa expired. She initially found work serving Spanish-language customers in a Montreal clothing store.

Chaves had studied languages and translation at Concordia but was nervous about her accent. To build her self-confidence for public speaking she took a comedy course with Andy Nulman of Just for Laughs. Chaves performed on stage at the conclusion of the course, which inspired her to pursue a career in stand-up comedy.

== Career ==
Chaves has been performing stand-up comedy since 1995. She has toured the comedy-club circuits in Canada, the United States and Latin America, and performs in English, Spanish, French and Italian. Chaves first performed at the Just for Laughs gala in 1998 and has been a regular at that Montreal festival and other major comedy festivals including those in Halifax, Winnipeg, Edmonton, Vancouver, Boston, and in Bogota, Colombia.

Chaves has also performed for the Canadian Armed Forces at CFS Alert and in Egypt, Israel and Afghanistan, and for the 2012 Nobel Women's Initiative delegation to Central America. She warmed up an audience of 43,000 before the 2015 Pan American Games opening ceremony and hosted the 2016 ACTRA Awards.

She has had two nationally televised stand-up comedy specials: Comics! on CBC and There's Something About Martha on CTV and The Comedy Network. She frequently performs on CBC Radio's The Debaters, Because News and Laugh Out Loud; she was one of the latter show's five most-requested performers who appeared at their 10th anniversary gala. Chaves performed at a comedy show for the BBC World Service when it recorded an episode of The Arts Hour in Montreal.

Chaves came out publicly around 2009 and began working her experience as a homosexual person of colour into her material. At about this time she began writing and performing in a series of one-woman shows. Her semi-autobiographical play In Times of Trouble, about a lesbian woman returning to Guatemala to care for her dying born-again Christian mother, premiered at the Soulo festival in 2014 and opened the Caminos Pan-American arts festival in 2015.

While continuing to perform mainstream shows, Chaves performs many gay, Latin or ethnic events. She headlined in Canada's first LGBTQ+ comedy tour, Queer and Present Danger, which performed in more than 25 cities. She also headlined in The Ethnic Rainbow, Canada's first comedy show featuring LGBTQ comedians of colour. Chaves performed in multiple showcases at Toronto Pride.

Chaves was nominated for the Canadian Comedy Award for Best Female Standup every year from 2001 to 2006. She won the award for Best Standup Comic of 2017.

== Activism ==
Chaves has performed at fundraisers including Stand Up for Nicaragua and Gags for Rags, and has been a keynote speaker for numerous charity events.

Chaves has spoken at many high schools as part of an anti-bullying campaign, and spoke at an annual 4/20 rally on Parliament Hill in Ottawa. She took part in a comedy marathon for the Canadian Association of Stand Up Comedians (CASC) which sought to have stand-up comedy recognized as an art form, eligible for federal arts grants and aid with visa issues.

Chaves lives in Toronto's Church and Wellesley neighbourhood and supported Olivia Chow in the 2014 Toronto mayoral election.

== Works ==
=== One-person shows ===
- Staying Alive (2010)
- Fragile (2012)
- In Times of Trouble (2014)
- Rebel Without a Pause (2017)

=== Film and television ===
- Strong Medicine (2000–2006 TV series) – Brenda, pilot episode
- Down to Earth (2001 film) – Rosa (maid)
- John Q. (2002 film) – Rosa Gonzales
- Get Rich or Die Tryin' (2005 film) – woman
