= Tim Steeves =

Canadian stand-up comedian and writer (died 2022)

- Born: Sussex, New Brunswick, Canada
- Died: October 27, 2022 (aged 58); Toronto, Ontario, Canada

Tim Steeves (died October 27, 2022) was a Canadian stand-up comedian and writer. He wrote for This Hour Has 22 Minutes, The Rick Mercer Report and helped create the Canadian TV comedy special Talking to Americans.

Steeves had shared in wins for three Gemini Awards for "Best Writing in a Comedy Series". He also shared in wins at the Canadian Comedy Awards and the Writers Guild of Canada Awards.

Steeves was co-star of the CBC Television sketch show The Bette Show and host of Global's Game On. At the 9th Gemini Awards in 1995, he was nominated for his performance in Comics!.

Steeves had headlined internationally at clubs and theaters, including the Montreal International Comedy Festival's "Just for Laughs". He has also had his own Comedy Now! special.

Steeves was originally from Sussex, New Brunswick and was co-captain (with Mark Forsythe) of the 1984 New Brunswick AA Basketball Champions. He was married to journalist Sonya Buyting.

Steeves died of pancreatic cancer, age 58, on October 27, 2022 in Toronto.
