= Shaun Majumder =

Canadian actor and comedian (born 1972)

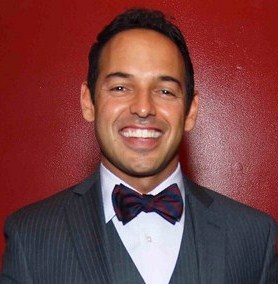
- Majumder in 2010
- Born: January 29, 1972 (age 54); Toronto, Ontario, Canada
- Occupations: Actor, comedian
- Years active: 1997–present
- Spouse: Shelby Fenner (m. 2012)
- Children: 2

Shaun Majumder (born January 29, 1972) is a Canadian actor and comedian. He is best known for his role on This Hour Has 22 Minutes, where he worked from 2003 until 2018. He won a Gemini Award for his work on the series in 2006. His other television credits include Republic of Doyle (2010–2014) and From (2022–present).

== Early life ==
Majumder was born on January 29, 1972 in Toronto, Ontario to Mani Majumder, an Indian father from West Bengal, and Marian Bartlett, a European-Canadian woman from Burlington, Newfoundland. He was raised in his mother's hometown of Burlington. His parents separated after seven years. Majumder has an older sister named Rani.

Majumder has said that because he was raised by a white mother and around white people, he had no idea he "was anything but white". In his standup acts, he jokes about joining his schoolmates in chanting racist slurs before realizing that he was the victim they were talking about. Majumder was very close to his mother who he says raised them selflessly so that he and his sister were unaware of the extreme poverty in which they lived. His mother died of a heart attack in 2003. Majumder credits Newfoundland as an influence over his work.

== Career ==
Majumder started his entertainment career as an announcer for the YTV game show CLIPS, and soon was hosting the network's popular morning kids show Brain Wash, where he was known as Ed Brainbin. He also hosted the "Slime Tour" segments on the popular game show Uh Oh!. Eventually he joined This Hour Has 22 Minutes in 2003, and also hosted 15 episodes of the Just for Laughs specials on television and participated in the Comedy festivals in Montreal. He was also a star of Cedric the Entertainer Presents, aired in the United States on the Fox network, and appeared in an NFB documentary on aspiring Canadian comics, The Next Big Thing.

Majumder has also starred in the CBC comedy pilot Hatching, Matching and Dispatching and the short film Plain Brown Rapper. He also appeared as Kumar's brother in the 2004 comedy Harold & Kumar Go to White Castle.

Majumder often plays an alter ego called Raj Binder. Binder is an awkward, nervous and usually excessively sweaty Indian reporter with a strong accent. Binder first appeared in a sketch from a comedy showcase with some former YTV costars called The Bobroom, and also appeared on Just For Laughs and This Hour Has 22 Minutes. Majumder caused some minor controversy when "Raj" posed in the MegaStars group picture during the 2003 Heritage Classic NHL outdoor ice-hockey game. In 2006, Majumder won a Gemini Award for his work on This Hour Has 22 Minutes.

Majumder made a guest appearance on two episodes of the television series 24, playing Hasan Numair. He also played Dr. Freddy Sahgal in the short-lived Fox TV series Unhitched, which aired in March 2008.

In 2010, Majumder had a guest starring role as Benny Natchie in Republic of Doyle, and from 2010 to 2011 starred in the American TV series Detroit 1-8-7 as Detective Vikram Mahajan.

In the summer of 2011, Majumder was cast in The Firm, a Canadian-American co-production, in the recurring role of Andrew Palmer, the lawyer at the firm who befriends Josh Lucas' character Mitch McDeere. The show ran for one season.

From 2013 to 2014, Majumder starred in the documentary TV series Majumder Manor, which documented his quest to develop the tourism potential in his picturesque hometown of Burlington, Newfoundland. The show also featured his family, friends, and community.

In December 2016, Majumder starred in a controversial satirical short produced by This Hour Has 22 Minutes, titled "Beige Power", which called for white supremacists to "embrace the beige" and accept that humans will all "look the same by the year 3000". The short received mixed reviews, with some criticising it for being racist, and others finding it humorous.

In August 2018, Majumder was not hired back for the next season of This Hour Has 22 Minutes after he sent a letter to the producers with suggestions on the future direction of the show. Citing creative differences with Majumder, the production team chose to cut ties.

In 2021, Deadline announced that Majumder was cast in the forthcoming science fiction horror television series From, and the first season of the series was released globally in 2022.

== Personal life ==
On 21 December 2012, Majumder married American actress Shelby Fenner. They have two daughters. Majumder lived in Los Angeles but moved to Halifax, Nova Scotia in 2025.

== Filmography ==
=== Films ===
| Year | Title | Role | Notes |
|---|---|---|---|
| 1998 | Reluctant Angel | Male Clerk | |
| 1999 | Pushing Tin | New Controller | |
| 2000 | The Ladies Man | V.S.A. Member | |
| 2002 | Purpose | Victor | |
| 2004 | Harold & Kumar Go to White Castle | Saikat Patel | |
| 2005 | Plain Brown Rapper | Sundeep Rappa | Short film |
| 2007 | I Now Pronounce You Chuck & Larry | Protester Outside of Court | Uncredited |
| 2009 | Bob Funk | Raymundo | |

=== TV ===
| Year | Title | Role | Episode |
|---|---|---|---|
| 1997 | Uh Oh! | Himself | Episode: "Absence Maze the Hat Grew Fonder" |
| 1997 | Once a Thief | The Prince | Episode: "It Happened One Night" |
| 1998–1999 | SketchCom | Various roles | 2 episodes |
| 1999 | The City | Mick | Episode: "Blood Sports" |
| 2000 | The Bobroom | Various | Television special |
| 2001 | Relic Hunter | Baz | Episode: "The Light of Truth" |
| 2002 | Royal Canadian Air Farce | Chip Kellaway / The Visible Minority | Episode 9.13 |
| 2002–2003 | Cedric the Entertainer Presents | Various roles | 17 episodes |
| 2003 | This Hour Has 22 Minutes: New Year's Eve Special | Various roles | Television film |
| 2004 | Snakes & Ladders | Daniel Ivory | Episode: "Sisters" |
| 2004 | Nevermind Nirvana | Raju Mehta | Television film |
| 2006 | Hatching, Matching and Dispatching | Cyril Pippy | 6 episodes |
| 2007 | 24 | Hasan Numair | 2 episodes |
| 2008 | Unhitched | Freddy | 6 episodes |
| 2008 | Robson Arms | Dr. Jordan Cohen | "Episode: "Baby? What Baby?" |
| 2009 | Da Kink in My Hair | Sanjay | 3 episodes |
| 2009 | Married Not Dead | Jay | Television film |
| 2008–2009 | Less Than Kind | Tito | 3 episodes |
| 2010–2011 | Detroit 1-8-7 | Detective Vikram Mahajan | 18 episodes |
| 2010, 2014 | Republic of Doyle | Benny Natchie | 2 episodes |
| 2011 | Bad Mom | Kevin | Television film |
| 2012 | The Firm | Andrew Palmer | 12 episodes |
| 2013 | Satisfaction | Trevor | Episode: "First contact" |
| 2015 | Breed | Teddy | Television film |
| 2013–2017 | This Hour Has 22 Minutes | Various | 82 episodes |
| 2017 | A Christmas Fury | Cyril Pippy | Television film |
| 2018 | Addison | Max | 10 episodes |
| 2021 | Something Undone | Coroner | 3 episodes |
| 2022–2026 | From | Father Rudra Khatri | 16 episodes |
| 2025 | Star Trek: Strange New Worlds | Dr. Trunn Voor | Episode: "What is Starfleet?" |
| 2026 | The Miniature Wife | Gary | 3 episodes |
| 2026 | Hot Dog Dynasty | Kalvin | Episode: "The Dogfather" |

=== Radio ===
| Year | Title | Role | Episode |
|---|---|---|---|
| 2006–2007 | The Debaters | Original Series Host | Season 1 (26 out of 32 episodes) |
| 2007–2008 | The Debaters | Host | Season 2 (3 episodes) |

=== Web series ===
| Year | Title | Role | Notes | Ref. |
|---|---|---|---|---|
| 2025 | Tales From Woodcreek | Cyrus Flynn | Filmed theatrical play; guest role | |
