= Gilson Lubin =

Canadian broadcaster and comedian

- Occupation: Stand-up comedian
- Website: http://www.gilsonlubin.ca

Gilson Lubin is a Canadian stand-up comedian, best known as a host of MTV Live.

He won a Canadian Comedy Award for Best Stand-Up Newcomer at the 4th Canadian Comedy Awards in 2002.
