= Pete Zedlacher =

Canadian stand-up comedian, actor, and writer

Pete Zedlacher is a Canadian stand-up comedian, actor and television writer. Originally from Wawa, Ontario, he has appeared at Just for Laughs and the Halifax Comedy Festival, and won the 2006 Canadian Comedy Award for Best Male Stand-Up. He has also performed for the Canadian Forces on several Canadian Forces Show Tours, entertaining the troops in such places as Alert, Nunavut, the Persian Gulf and Kandahar, Afghanistan. As an actor, he has appeared in the movies American Pie: The Naked Mile and Survival of the Dead and on TV in The Jon Dore Television Show.

In 2010, Zedlacher worked as a writer and performer on CBC television's The Hour He combined his performing and writing when he joined CBC's The Ron James Show which he wrote and performed in for 4 seasons.

In 2013, Zedlacher won Sirius XM's Top Comic, the prestigious nationwide comedy competition sponsored by Sirius XM, earning him the title of 'Top Comic' and $25,000

Since 2015, Zedlacher has been the anchor on The Snowed in Comedy Tour, Canada's biggest comedy tour, making 60 stops coast-to-coast in 2019.

In 2019, Zedlacher earned a sixth Best Male Standup Comedian nomination at the Canadian Comedy Awards, making him one of the most nominated comics in the awards' history.
