= Comedy Inc. (Canadian TV series) =

Canadian sketch comedy television series

- Starring: Roman Danylo; Aurora Browne; Jen Goodhue; Albert Howell; Terry McGurrin; Winston Spear; Jennifer Robertson; Renee Percy; Ian Sirota; Gavin Stephens; Nikki Payne
- Country of origin: Canada
- No. of seasons: 5

Production
- Running time: 30 minutes episodes

Original release
- Network: CTV
- Release: September 27, 2003 – 2007

Comedy Inc. is a Canadian sketch comedy television series. It aired on CTV, A-Channel and The Comedy Network from 2003 until 2007.

== Cast ==
The show starred Roman Danylo, Aurora Browne, Jen Goodhue, Albert Howell, Terry McGurrin, Winston Spear, Jennifer Robertson, Renee Percy, Gavin Stephens, Ian Sirota and Nikki Payne.

== Awards ==
The cast received a Gemini Award nomination for Best Ensemble Performance in a Comedy Program or Series at the 22nd Gemini Awards in 2007. Danylo was nominated for Best Individual Performance in a Comedy Program or Series at the 19th Gemini Awards in 2004, and Sirota was nominated in the same category at the 23rd Gemini Awards in 2008.

Comedy Inc. was nominated for a Canadian Comedy Award for Best Writing in a Television Series in 2006. The series won the Gold World Medal at the New York Festivals for Best TV Variety Program in both 2005 and 2006.
