= Gavin Stephens =

Canadian comedian

Gavin Stephens is a Canadian comedian. He is most noted for his 2021 comedy album All Inclusive Coma, for which he was a Juno Award nominee for Comedy Album of the Year at the Juno Awards of 2022.

He was previously a cast member of the sketch comedy series Comedy Inc. from 2003 to 2007.
