= Chris Finn =

Canadian comedian and writer

Chris Finn is a Canadian stand-up comedian and comedy writer.

Finn was raised in Ottawa, Ontario. He has written for several television shows, including MAD TVThis Hour Has 22 Minutes, Talking to Americans, The Rick Mercer Report and Corner Gas. He has won five Gemini Awards and a 2001 Canadian Comedy Award as a writer for This Hour Has 22 Minutes.
