= Kristeen Von Hagen =

Canadian comedian and actress (born 1976)

Kristeen von Hagen (born in Victoria, British Columbia) is a Canadian/American comedian, writer and actress. She is currently the opening comedian for the Las Vegas residency of Puppetry of the Penis

Kristeen is a 4 time Canadian Comedy Award winner and has been seen on the Just for Laughs Festival, Winnipeg Comedy Festival, Showtime's Comedy without Borders as well as 2 Comedy Now! CTV Specials.

As a writer and producer Kristeen has won 4 Canadian Screen Awards. Her recent writing credits include the Juno Awards, Stronger Together, Canada Day and Canada's Walk of Fame.

. Von Hagen has won Best Female Stand-up of at the Canadian Comedy Awards twice. She appears in the NFB documentary on aspiring comics, The Next Big Thing.
