= Irwin Barker =

Canadian comedian

Irwin Barker (June 13, 1952 – June 21, 2010) was a Canadian comedian and writer. He wrote for This Hour Has 22 Minutes and The Rick Mercer Report, and was nominated for four Gemini Awards as a writer and one as stand-up performer for his 2005 performance at the Halifax Comedy Festival. Barker was also nominated for three Writers' Guild of Canada Screenwriter's awards, and won the award in 2008. He was a regular writer and contributor for CBC Radio's The Debaters.

In June 2007, Barker was diagnosed with leiomyosarcoma, a rare type of terminal cancer. He joked that his doctor had given him twelve months to live, "but my lawyer says he can get it down to eight".

After his diagnosis, he was active as an inspirational speaker on how he used humour as a vital coping mechanism in his personal fight against cancer. He was a headline performer at numerous cancer fundraisers, as well as a keynote speaker for conferences dealing with cancer and palliative care.

His first year of cancer treatment was the subject of a CTV documentary entitled That's My Time. The documentary debuted at the 2008 Atlantic Film Festival and was nationally televised in September 2008.

Reactions to Barker's presentations on comedy and cancer were overwhelmingly positive. In Barker's own words. "Cancer has my body but not my spirit, and I'll continue to make jokes, not so much about cancer, but in spite of it."

He died in Toronto on June 21, 2010, shortly after his 58th birthday, from his cancer.
