= The Jon Dore Television Show =

- Created by: Jon Dore; John Brunton
- Written by: Jon Dore; Laurie Elliott; Mark Forward; Steve Patterson
- Directed by: Matthew Hawkins; Adam Brodie; Dave Derewlany; Mark Mainguy
- Starring: Jon Dore
- Composers: Orin Isaacs; David Williams
- Country of origin: Canada
- No. of seasons: 2
- No. of episodes: 26

Production
- Executive producers: John Brunton; Barbara Bowlby
- Running time: 22 Minutes

Original release
- Network: The Comedy Network
- Release: October 17, 2007 – April 15, 2009

The Jon Dore Television Show is a Canadian mockumentary-style comedy television series, created by Jon Dore and John Brunton. The show stars Canadian actor and comedian Jon Dore, of recent Canadian Idol co-host fame. The Comedy Network ordered 13 half-hour episodes of the series, which premiered on October 17, 2007 at 10pm ET. The second season premiered on January 21, 2009. A third season was supposed to be premiered in 2010 until Dore confirmed the series' cancellation. The show also aired on the Independent Film Channel in the United States.

On June 2, 2011, during an interview, Dore made a mention of The Jon Dore Television Show Movie. It was presumed that a script entered development, but as of 2015, the project may be abandoned.

== Episode format ==
Each half-hour episode revolves around the central character, Jon Dore, playing a pseudo-realistic version of himself.

At the beginning of each episode, Jon Dore can usually be seen contemplating a life choice, revelation, or combating/dealing with a singular global issue which will be the central plot element of each episode, and then usually introduces himself by saying "Hi. I'm TV's Jon Dore". The format involves fictional scripted scenes of story intertwined with plot-related interviews. The interviews involve Jon Dore sitting down in real-life interviews or interacting realistically (as in the case of a doctor visit) with somebody in real life, whose occupation or vocation is a position relatable to the story, as well as the progression of the story thus far (such as receiving an official sperm count at a donation clinic, near the end of an episode dealing with sexual fertility.) The camera, usually operated solely by Dore or by a small two-man crew, according to the show itself, catches the real-life reactions of the interviewees as well as Dore's antics as he proposes often ludicrous, comical, uncomfortable, and seemingly realistic questions and circumstances.

As the real-life interviews which help to forward the story end, they are usually closed-off with Dore and the crew exiting or on set of the location, with Dore often breaking the fourth wall and becoming heavily camera conscious, adverse to the conventional methodology of standard contemporary reality TV shows (such as Kathy Griffin's My Life on the D-List, which follows a similar albeit fully non-fictional format accompanying little camera-interaction). Also, further adding to the oft increasingly confusing presentation of each episode, Dore is seen discussing a joke or plot element with the writers in an apparent "writer's room", referencing a concurrent or preceding episode element, and the path and discussion that involved its inception into the final episode.

At the end of each show, Dore is shown contemplating the events of the episode and explaining his feelings about them to the audience. The host closes every episode with the phrase "I'm Jon Dore, thank you for watching television".

Jon Dore has confirmed that the show has been canceled, reruns occasionally air on The Comedy Network and IFC.

== Recurring guests ==
Therapist Susan Lynne has appeared as Jon Dore's therapist in several episodes. Ms. Lynne is an actual Toronto-based therapist who was approached by the show's producers to appear in an episode. She was later asked to reprise her role when her interaction with Jon was found to work well on-screen. The dialogue between Jon and Susan is unscripted, with Susan attempting to engage Jon as if he were an actual client, despite his exaggerated 'personal issues'.

== Awards and nominations ==
- 2008, Jon Dore, Mark Forward, Steve Patterson were winners of 'Best Series Writing' at the Canadian Comedy Awards
- 2009, Adam Brodie and Dave Derewlany, winners for 'best direction' (episode "Jon Gets Haunted"), at the Canadian Comedy Awards
- 2009, Jon Dore, winner for 'best performance (male)', at the Canadian Comedy Awards
- 2009, Matt Hawkins, nominated for best direction, episode "Jon Gets Horny", at Canadian Comedy Awards

== Episodes ==
=== Season 1: 2007-08 ===
No.	Title	Original release date	Prod. code
1	"Fertility"	October 17, 2007	101
2	"Problem Drinker"	October 24, 2007	103
3	"Fit"	October 31, 2007	104
4	"Happiness"	November 7, 2007	102
5	"STD"	November 14, 2007	106
6	"Smoking"	November 21, 2007	105
7	"Manly Man"	November 28, 2007	107
8	"Ready for Love"	December 5, 2007	108
9	"Jon Gets Scared"	December 12, 2007	109
10	"Jon Gets Political"	January 2, 2008	110
11	"Jonathan-A-Thon"	January 31, 2008	111
12	"Rage"	February 7, 2008	113
13	"Loss and Roger"	February 14, 2008	112

=== Season 2: 2009 ===
No.	Title	Original release date	Prod. code
1	"Jon Fights Discrimination"	January 21, 2009	201
2	"Jon Gets Horny"	January 28, 2009	202
3	"Jon Gets Old"	February 4, 2009	203
4	"Jon Fights Violence"	February 11, 2009	204
5	"Jon Gets Competitive"	February 18, 2009	205
6	"Jon has a Medical Scare"	February 25, 2009	206
7	"Jon Lives a Lie"	March 4, 2009	207
8	"Jon Needs Cash Quick"	March 11, 2009	208
9	"Jon Saves the Planet"	March 18, 2009	209
10	"Jon Gets Haunted"	March 25, 2009	210
11	"Jon Wants Justice"	April 1, 2009	211
12	"Jon's Christmas"	April 8, 2009	212
13	"Jon Does Drugs"	April 15, 2009	213
