= Winston Spear =

Canadian stand-up comedian and actor

- Winston at work.
- Born: April 1965 (age 60–61); Montreal, Quebec, Canada
- Other name: The King Of Obscure
- Notable work: The Bobroom, Comedy Inc.

Comedy career
- Years active: 1987 - Present
- Medium: Stand-up, Television, Film
- Genre: Comedy

Winston Spear (born 1965) is a Canadian stand-up comedian and actor originally from Montreal, Quebec, best known as a cast member of the sketch comedy shows Comedy Inc. and The Bobroom.

He was the winner of the 2003 Canadian Comedy Award for Best Male Stand-Up, and was a semi-finalist on Season 6 of Last Comic Standing.
