= Bruce Hunter (actor) =

Canadian actor and comedian

Bruce Hunter (born 1961) is a Canadian actor and comedian from Calgary, Alberta. He has appeared in television shows such as Puppets Who Kill and The Red Green Show. Hunter received a Canadian Comedy Awards nomination in 2002 for his work on the television series After Hours. He voices the king of Happily-Ever-Afterville on the PBS show Cyberchase.

He is a member of the internationally renowned comedy troupe Illustrated Men along with David Huband and Adrian Truss.

Hunter also voiced X-5 on the Teletoon show Atomic Betty.
