= Derek Edwards =

Canadian comedian

- Born: 1958 (age 67–68); Timmins, Ontario, Canada
- Occupations: Actor, comedian
- Years active: 1988–present

Derek Edwards (born 1958) is a Canadian stand-up comedian and actor from Timmins, Ontario. He went to Timmins High and Vocational School.

In 1995, he was the winner of the Vail National Comedy Invitational in Vail, Colorado. He is the only Canadian to date to have won this award. He won the 2004 Canadian Comedy Award for best male stand-up. He has been featured in the Just for Laughs Comedy Festival five times, in 1997, 1999, 2003, 2008, and 2010.

He has been referred to as "...the funniest man in Canada. Everybody knows that," by Rick Mercer and as an emulation of "...Kramer from Seinfeld...an odd, hysterically funny, brilliant artist," by Mitch Fatel.

Edwards' style is defined by his low voice and sarcastic delivery. He now lives in Toronto, Ontario.

== Notes and references ==
- MacPherson, Guy. "Derek Edwards takes standup to next stage." Vancouver Sun. May 31, 2007.
