= Ryan Belleville =

Canadian stand-up comedian and actor

- Born: May 8, 1979 (age 46); Calgary, Alberta, Canada
- Occupation(s): Stand-up comedian, actor
- Years active: 1999–present

Ryan Belleville (born May 8, 1979) is a Canadian stand-up comedian and actor.

== Career ==
Belleville became the youngest person to tape his own Comedy Now! special for CTV. He also appeared in CBC's The Sean Cullen Show and the film Going the Distance. He was also "Slime Master Ryan" on the YTV series Uh Oh! Belleville portrayed Eddie in the 2004 Disney Channel Original Movie Stuck in the Suburbs and had a starring role in 2008 as Finn in Finn on the Fly.

In 2011, he co-wrote and starred in the Canadian sitcom, Almost Heroes. He also voices Holger Holghart in the Teletoon animated show Detentionaire. He played the recurring character Jasper on the Fox TV series Life on a Stick, and also appeared on the CTV show, Satisfaction.

He was also in the cast of the Netflix/CBC Television comedy series Workin' Moms Canadian TV comedy series with Catherine Reitman.

=== Stand-up comedy ===
Belleville won the Phil Hartman Award and won a Canadian Comedy Award. He has appeared eight times at the Just for Laughs comedy festival in Montreal, several times at the Winnipeg Comedy Festival and the Halifax Comedy Fest.

In June 2016 Belleville produced and co-hosted a 12-hour telethon, with proceeds going to the Canadian Red Cross to help the victims of the Fort McMurray wildfires.

== Personal life ==
Belleville is the brother of Jason Belleville, a writer and producer.

He is married to Jenn Belleville, and together they have a son and a daughter.

== Filmography ==
=== Film ===
Year	Title	Role	Notes
2004	Going the Distance	Dime	
2008	Finn on the Fly	Finn	
2013	Step Dogs	Louie	

=== Television ===
Year	Title	Role	Notes
1999	Honey, I Shrunk the Kids: The TV Show	Safe-T Guy	Episode: "Honey, You're Driving Me Like Crazy"
2003	The Seán Cullen Show	Critic	Television film
2004	Stuck in the Suburbs	Eddie	Television film
2005	Life on a Stick	Jasper	10 episodes
2007	Nobody	Marcus	Television film
2011	Little Mosque on the Prairie	Phil	Episode: "Brother, Can You Spare a Mosque?"
2011	She's the Mayor	Eddie	5 episodes
2011	Almost Heroes	Peter	8 episodes
2011–2015	Detentionaire	Holger Holgaart	53 episodes
2012	The L.A. Complex	Scott Cray	8 episodes
2013	Lost Girl	Balzac	Episode: "Fae-ge Against the Machine"
2013	Satisfaction	Mark Movenpick	13 episodes
2014	Murdoch Mysteries	Ed Ward	Episode: "The Keystone Constables"
2015, 2018	Odd Squad	Gooey Randall	2 episodes
2016	Ice Girls	Angel	Television film
2016	Wynonna Earp	Dr. Reggie	3 episodes
2016	Winston Steinburger and Sir Dudley Ding Dong	Dudley	52 episodes
2017–2019	Hotel Transylvania: The Series	Additional voices	15 episodes
2017–2023	Workin' Moms	Lionel Carlson	66 episodes
2022	Overlord and the Underwoods	Baker's Island Host	Episode: "Under the Sea Land"
