= Nikki Payne =

Canadian comedian and actress

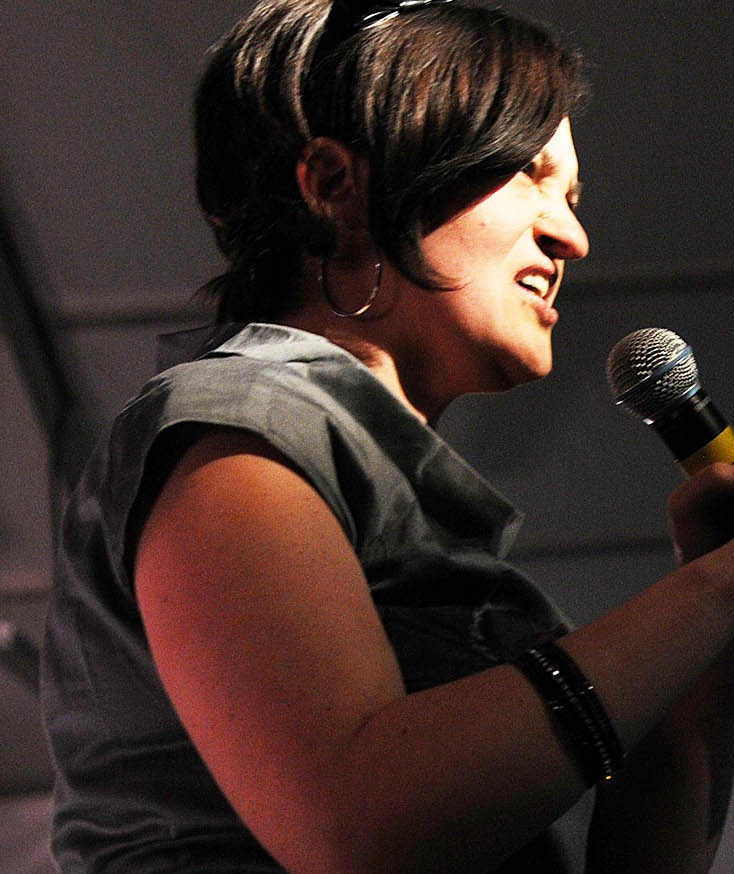
- Born: January 17, 1976 (age 50); Lower Sackville, Nova Scotia, Canada
- Occupations: Actress, comedian
- Years active: 2001–present

Nikki Payne (also credited as Nikkie Payne) (born January 17, 1976) is a Canadian comedian and actress from Lower Sackville, Nova Scotia, Canada. Born with a cleft palate, she is well-known for incorporating her lisp into her comedy act. She has won three Canadian Comedy Awards for Best Stand-up Newcomer and Best Female Stand-up in 2003, 2005, and 2008.

== Early life ==
Payne was born at Lower Sackville, Nova Scotia. She attended the Nova Scotia Community College in Truro, where she acted as a sports team mascot. She then attended Humber School of Comedy and The Second City Conservatory.

== Career ==
As well as performing in comedy clubs, Payne has appeared in Last Comic Standing, Video on Trial, Buzz, Am I Right??, Satisfaction, and the NFB documentary The Next Big Thing. She has also appeared in the Canadian sketch comedy show Comedy Inc. She was also a member of the comedy troupe The Boom.

By 2012, Payne was performing her comedy routines on the theatre circuit. That year, she was named Comedy Person of the Year at the annual Canadian Comedy Awards in Toronto.

Payne is a frequent guest on CBC Radio's The Debaters.

She won the Canadian Screen Award for Best Supporting Actress in a Comedy Series at the 2nd Canadian Screen Awards for her appearance on Satisfaction.

In 2017, Payne acted as host of the Nature Conservancy of Canada's documentary film, The Enlightened Redneck’s Guide to Moose Sex.
