= 23rd Gemini Awards =

2008 awards for Canadian television

- Date: November 28, 2008
- Venue: John Bassett Theatre, Toronto
- Hosted by: Jason Priestley

Television/radio coverage
- Network: Showcase, E!

The Academy of Canadian Cinema & Television's 23rd Gemini Awards were held on November 28, 2008, to honour achievements in Canadian television. The awards show, which was hosted by Jason Priestley, took place at the John Bassett Theatre in Toronto and was broadcast on Showcase and E!.

== Best Dramatic Series ==
- Intelligence – Haddock Entertainment. Producers: Chris Haddock, Laura Lightbown, Arvi Liimatainen
- The Border – White Pine Pictures. Producers: Peter Raymont, David Barlow, Brian Dennis, Janet Maclean
- Durham County – Muse Entertainment, Back Alley Film Productions. Producers: Janis Lundman, Adrienne Mitchell, Michael Prupas
- Murdoch Mysteries – Shaftesbury Films, Rogers Media, UKTV. Producers: Christina Jennings, Cal Coons, Scott Garvie, Noel Hedges, Jan Peter Meyboom
- The Tudors – Peace Arch Entertainment, Reveille Productions, Working Title Films, Showtime Networks. Producers: Sheila Hockin, Morgan O’Sullivan

== Best Dramatic Mini-Series ==
- The Englishman's Boy – Mind's Eye Entertainment. Producer: Kevin DeWalt
- Across the River to Motor City – Devine Entertainment, Jonsworth Productions. Producers: Robert Wertheimer, David Devine, Richard Mozer
- Would Be Kings – C.O.R.E., Norstar Entertainment. Producers: Ilana Frank, Tassie Cameron, Daphne Park, Ray Sager, Peter R. Simpson, Esta Spalding, David Wellington

== Best TV Movie ==
- Mayerthorpe – Slanted Wheel Entertainment, Seven24 Films. Producers: Jordy Randall, Tom Cox, Jon Slan
- A Life Interrupted – Incendo Productions. Producers: Jean Bureau, Anne Carlucci, Serge Denis, Stephen Greenberg, Josee Mauffette
- Sticks and Stones – Cirrus Communications, Dream Street Pictures. Producers: Josée Vallée, André Béraud, Tim Hogan, Rick LeGuerrier
- Luna: Spirit of the Whale – Screen Siren Pictures. Producer: Trish Dolman
- Victor – Indian Grove Productions, Muse Entertainment, Canadian Broadcasting Corporation. Producer: Bernard Zukerman

== Best Comedy Program or Series ==
- This Hour Has 22 Minutes – Halifax Film Company, CBC. Producers: Mark Farrell, Susan MacDonald, Jack Kellum, Jenipher Ritchie, Geoff D'Eon
- Odd Job Jack – Smiley Guy Studios. Producers: Denny Silverthorne, Adrian Carter, Jonas Diamond, Jeremy Diamond
- Rent-a-Goalie – Eggplant Picture & Sound, Fifth Ground Entertainment, Georgian Entertainment. Producers: Christopher Bolton, Chris Szarka
- Cock'd Gunns – Tricon Films & Television. Producers: Andrea Gorfolova, Brooks Gray, Andy King, Shaam Makan, Leo Scherman, Morgan Waters
- Corner Gas – CTV Television Network, Prairie Pants Productions. Producers: Brent Butt, David Storey, Virginia Thompson, Mark Farrell, Kevin White
- Kenny vs. Spenny – Canadian Broadcasting Corporation, Cinefornia, Blueprint Entertainment, Eggplant Picture & Sound, KVS Productions. Producers: Abby Finer, Amy Marcella, Kenny Hotz, Ira Levy, John Morayniss, Spencer Rice, Kirsten Scollie, Peter Williamson, Noreen Halpern, Trey Parker, Matt Stone

== Best Music, Variety Program or Series ==
- Juno Awards of 2008 – Canadian Academy of Recording Arts and Sciences, CTV Television Network. Producers: John Brunton, Melanie Berry, Barbara Bowlby, Louise Wood, Stephen Stohn
- Canadian Idol – Insight Productions, 19 Entertainment, FremantleMedia North America, Canadian Broadcasting Corporation. Producers: John Brunton, Barbara Bowlby, Sue Brophey, Mark Lysakowski
- 2007 MuchMusic Video Awards – MuchMusic. Producers: John Kampilis, Sheila Sullivan, Bob Pagrach
- East Coast Sessions – Canadian Broadcasting Corporation. Producer: Geoff D'Eon

== Best Performing Arts Program or Series, or Arts Documentary Program or Series ==
- Landscape as Muse – 291 Film Company. Producer: Ian Toews
- Embracing da Kink – V-Formation Productions. Producer: Joel Gordon
- Hamlet (Solo) – S&S Productions. Producers: Raoul Bhaneja, Andrew Barnsley
- Cowboy Junkies: Trinity Revisited – FogoLabs. Producers: Pierre Lamoureux, François Lamoureux
- Joni Mitchell: The Fiddle and the Drum – Joe Media Group. Producers: Matt Gillespie, Joe Novak, Karen Pickles

== Best Talk Series ==
- MTV Live – MTV. Producers: Pam DeMontmorency, Alex Sopinka
- George Stroumboulopoulos Tonight – Canadian Broadcasting Corporation. Producers: Jennifer Dettman, Susan Taylor, George Stroumboulopoulos, David Freeman
- The After Show – MTV. Producer: Garrett Wintrip

== Best Reality Program or Series ==
- Project Runway Canada – Slice. Producers: John Brunton, Barbara Bowlby, Andrea Gabourie
- Canada's Next Top Model – Temple Street Productions. Producers: Sheila Hockin, Brad Brough, David Fortier, Jay Manuel, Ivan Schneeberg
- Dragons' Den – Celador, Canadian Broadcasting Corporation. Producers: Catherine Annau, Tracie Tighe, Stuart Coxe, Lisa Gabriele
- Triple Sensation – Tiberius Entertainment. Producers: Garth Drabinsky, Sandra Cunningham, Sari Friedland, Alex Ganetakos
- The Week the Women Went – Paperny Entertainment. Producers: Cal Shumiatcher, Trevor Hodgson, Sally Aitken, David Paperny

== Best General/Human Interest Series ==
- X-Weighted – Anaid Productions. Producers: Margaret Mardirossian, David Way, Candice Tipton, Helen Schmidt
- Forensic Factor – Exploration Production. Producers: Edwina Follows, Jeffrey Hirschfield
- Pretty Dangerous – Summerhill Entertainment. Producers: Ron Lillie, Bill Johnston, Lee Herberman, Craig Baines, Barbara Shearer
- MegaWorld – Exploration Production. Producers: Karen McCairley, Anne Marie Varner
- Fish Out of Water – InterINDigital Entertainment, Joe Media Group. Producers: Katery Legault, Joe Novak, Neil Grahn

== Donald Brittain Award for Best Social/Political Documentary Program ==
- A Promise to the Dead: The Exile Journey of Ariel Dorfman – White Pine Pictures. Producer: Peter Raymont
- Forgiveness: Stories of Our Time – Wild East Productions, National Film Board of Canada. Producers: Johanna Lunn, Kent Martin
- Girl Inside – Red Queen Productions. Producers: Maya Gallus, Justine Pimlott
- A Place Between: The Story of an Adoption – National Film Board of Canada. Producers: Derek Mazur, Michael J. F. Scott, Graydon McCrea, Joseph MacDonald
- Frontline: Darfur: On Our Watch – PBS, Canadian Broadcasting Corporation. Producers: Lisa Ellenwood, Neil Docherty

== Best Documentary Series ==
- Diamond Road – Kensington Communications. Producer: Robert Lang
- CBC News: The Lens – Canadian Broadcasting Corporation. Producers: Angelina Stokman, Catherine Olsen, Charlotte Odele, Andrew Johnson
- The View from Here – TVOntario. Producers: Rudy Buttignol, Jane Jankovic
- The Nature of Things – Canadian Broadcasting Corporation. Producer: Michael Allder
- The Dark Years – Barna-Alper Productions, National Film Board of Canada, History Television. Producers: Laszlo Barna, Silva Basmajian, Gerry Flahive, Chuck Gammage, Steven Silver

== Best History Documentary Program ==
- Captain Cook: Obsession and Discovery – Ferns Productions. Producers: Andrew Ferns, Pat Ferns
- Turning Points of History – The Battle of Medak Pocket – Barna-Alper Productions, Connections Productions. Producers: Laszlo Barna, Steven Silver
- Bloody Saturday – Canadian Broadcasting Corporation. Producer: Andy Blicq
- 100 Films and a Funeral – Documentary Channel, Markham Street Films, Sundance TV. Producers: Judy Holm, Michael McNamara
- Charging the Rhino – Associated Producers. Producers: Alberta Nokes, Ric Esther Bienstock, Felix Golubev, Simcha Jacobovici

== Best Biography Documentary Program ==
- Confessions of an Innocent Man Paperny Films. Producers: David Paperny, Tracey Friesen, Trevor Hodgson, Terence McKeown, Cal Shumiatcher
- Captain Cook: Obsession and Discovery – Taking Command – Ferns Productions. Producers: Andrew Ferns, Pat Ferns
- Citizen Sam – National Film Board of Canada. Producers: Rina Fraticelli, Tracey Friesen
- Lovable – Primitive Entertainment. Producers: Michael McMahon, Kristina McLaughlin
- Long John Baldry: In the Shadow of the Blues – Boogie Woogie Productions, BBC, CHUM Television, Knowledge Network, Soapbox Productions. Producers: Corby Coffin, Nick Orchard

== Best Science, Technology, Nature, Environment or Adventure Documentary Program ==
- Doc Zone – Battle of the Bag – Canadian Broadcasting Corporation. Producers: Monika Delmos, Ryszard Hunka
- Four Wings and a Prayer – Celluloid Dreams, Optix Digital Pictures, Primitive Entertainment. Producers: Michael McMahon, Gerry Flahive, Emmanuel Laurent, Kristina McLaughlin
- The Refugees of the Blue Planet – Les Productions Virage, National Film Board of Canada, Point du Jour. Producers: Monique Simard, Yves Bisaillon, Luc Martin-Gousset, Marcel Simard
- Hubble’s Canvas – Blue Ant Media. Producers: Ivan Semeniuk, Craig Colby
- Long Haul Big Hearts – Brilliant Red Media. Producers: Doug Raby, Joan Jenkinson, Joanne P. Jackson

== Best News Information Series ==
- the fifth estate – Canadian Broadcasting Corporation. Producers: Sally Reardon, David Studer
- CBC News: Sunday – Canadian Broadcasting Corporation. Producers: Michael Kearns, Patsy Pehleman
- Marketplace – Canadian Broadcasting Corporation. Producers: Michael Gruzuk, F.M. Morrison

== Best News Magazine Segment ==
- The National/CBC News – Moshe and Munir – Canadian Broadcasting Corporation. Producers: Richard Devey, Udi Kivity, Samer Shalabi, Ian Kalushner, Adrienne Arsenault
- CBC News: Sunday – Girls in Gloves – Canadian Broadcasting Corporation. Producers: Michael Primeau, Tanny Chia, Michael Kearns
- The National/CBC News – Who Pulled the Plug on Lake Superior? – Canadian Broadcasting Corporation. Producers: Margo McDiarmid, Claude Panet-Raymond, Andy Hincenbergs, Doug Husby, Marijka Hurko
- The National/CBC News – A Deadly Landing – Canadian Broadcasting Corporation. Producers: Darrow MacIntyre, Robb Douglas, Jim Hoffman, Alex Shprintsen, Michael Taylor-Noonan
- The National/CBC News – Christianity Comes to Thailand – Canadian Broadcasting Corporation. Producer: Saša Petricic
- Marketplace – Buying Belief – Canadian Broadcasting Corporation. Producers: Greg Sadler, Kathryn Dickson, Andreas Wesley

== Best Newscast ==
- The National/CBC News – Canadian Broadcasting Corporation. Producers: Jonathan Whitten, Mark Harrison, Fred Parker, Greg Reaume, Terry Auciello
- Global National – Global News. Producers: Kenton Boston, Doriana Temolo, Bryan Grahn, Jason Keel, Kevin Newman
- Global Toronto – Global News. Producer: Ron Waksman

== Best News Special Event Coverage ==
- CBC News: Compass – Ice Storm Special – Canadian Broadcasting Corporation. Producers: Tracy Lightfoot, Chris Lane, Claire Nantes
- CBC News: Ontario Votes 2007 – Canadian Broadcasting Corporation. Producers: Rona Martell, Chad Paulin
- CityNews – CityVote 2007 Provincial Election. Citytv. Producers: Tina Cortese, Katia Del Col
- Global National – Budget 2008 – Global News. Producers: Bryan Mullan, Kenton Boston, Pam MacKenzie, Jason Keel, Bryan Grahn
- Global National – Canada Remembers November 11, 2007 – Global News. Producers: Bryan Mullan, Kenton Boston, Pam MacKenzie, Jason Keel, Bryan Grahn

== Best Lifestyle/Practical Information Series ==
- Chef School – Red Apple Entertainment. Producers: Dana Speers, Daniel Gelfant, Rachel Low
- Holmes on Homes – General Purpose Entertainment. Producers: Michael Quast, Mike Holmes, Pete Kettlewell
- Til Debt Do Us Part – Frantic Films. Producer: Jamie Brown, Jennifer Horvath
- At the Table With... – Firvalley Productions. Producers: Joseph Blasioli, Maria Pimentel, Jennifer Scott
- At the End of My Leash – Purple Dog Media, White Iron Pictures. Producers: Lisa Cichelly, Matthew Kershaw, Jean Merriman

== Best Lifestyle/Practical Information Segment ==
- CBC News: Sunday – Nikki Yanofsky – Canadian Broadcasting Corporation. Producers: Tony Marchitto, Dominique Banoun, Douglas Arrowsmith
- CBC News: Sunday – Coping With Deadly Allergies – Canadian Broadcasting Corporation. Producers: Michael Primeau, Pat Softly
- Daily Planet – Depth X – Discovery Channel. Producer: Doug Crosbie
- Daily Planet – Xray Sloth – Discovery Channel. Producer: Alix MacDonald
- Fortune Hunters – Easy Wash – Canadian Broadcasting Corporation. Producers: Alan Jones, James Dunne, Dianne Buckner
- Marketplace – Can't Buy Me Love – Canadian Broadcasting Corporation. Producers: Erica Johnson, Don Chung, Habiba Nosheen, Kathleen Coughlin

== Best Animated Program or Series ==
- Chop Socky Chooks – Aardman Animations, Decode Entertainment, Cartoon Network (Central and Eastern Europe). Producers: Miles Bullough, Neil Court, Steve Denure, Peter Lord, Beth Stevenson, Jacqueline White
- Ruby Gloom – Nelvana. Producers: Scott Dyer, Jocelyn Hamilton, Pam Lehn, Doug Murphy, Rita Street, Merle-Anne Ridley
- Leon in Wintertime – Divertissement Subséquence, Folimage, National Film Board of Canada. Producers: Pascal le Nôtre, Marie-Josée Corbeil, Christine Côté, Emmanuel Bernard
- Storm Hawks – Nerd Corps Entertainment. Producers: Asaph Fipke, Ken Faier, Chuck Johnson
- Total Drama – Fresh TV, Elliott Animation. Producers: Tom McGillis, George Elliott, Brian Irving, Jennifer Pertsch

== Best Pre-School Program or Series ==
- Will and Dewitt – Two Presidents Productions, Cookie Jar Entertainment. Producers: Susie Grondin, Michael Hirsh, Pamela Slavin, Toni Stevens, Toper Taylor
- The Backyardigans – Nelvana, Nickelodeon Animation Studio. Producers: Scott Dyer, Jocelyn Hamilton, Ellen Martin, Doug Murphy, Jennifer Hill, Janice Burgess, Pam Lehn
- Kids Canada – I Care – Canadian Broadcasting Corporation. Producers: Marie McCann, Phil McCordic, Erin Curtin, Jim Taylor, Nadine Henry, Patty Sullivan, Sid Bobb
- Are We There Yet?: World Adventure – Sinking Ship Entertainment. Producers: Blair Powers, J. J. Johnson, Matt Bishop
- Peep and the Big Wide World – WGBH-TV, 9 Story Entertainment, TVOntario, Discovery Kids, Eggbox, National Film Board of Canada. Producer: Kate Taylor

== Best Children's or Youth Fiction Program or Series ==
- Degrassi: The Next Generation – Bell Media, Epitome Pictures. Producers: Linda Schuyler, Brendon Yorke, Stephanie Williams, David Lowe, Stephen Stohn
- Instant Star – DHX Media. Producers: Linda Schuyler, Stephanie Williams, David Lowe, Stephen Stohn
- Tumbletown Tales – TVOntario. Producers: Phil McCordic, Pat Ellingson, Marney Malabar, Steve Diguer

== Best Children's or Youth Non-Fiction Program or Series ==
- Ghost Trackers – CCI Entertainment. Producer: Jim Corston
- The Adrenaline Project – Marblemedia. Producers: Matthew Hornburg, Mark J.W. Bishop, Roberta Pazdro
- Prank Patrol – Apartment 11 Productions. Producers: Jonathan Finkelstein, Maryke McEwen
- Heads Up! – Look Back Productions. Producers: Barrie Dunn, Annette Clarke

== Best Sports Analysis or Commentary Program, Series or Segment ==
- Hockey Night in Canada – Scotiabank Hockey Tonight – CBC Sports. Producers: Sherali Najak, Brian Spear
- The Season: 07 Jays – Sportsnet. Producers: Mike English, Kevin Foley
- TSN The Reporters with Dave Hodge – TSN. Producers: Ken Volden, David Stiff

== Best Sports Feature Segment ==
- Hockey Night in Canada – Inside Hockey: The Auditorium – CBC Sports. Producer: Jennifer Barr
- CBC News: Sunday – Golf Prodigy – Canadian Broadcasting Corporation. Producer: Leonardo Palleja
- Sportsnet Connected: Rick Ankiel: The Comeback – Sportsnet. Producer: Darren Winkler

== Best Live Sporting Event ==
- Hockey Night in Canada – Outdoor Classic – CBC Sports. Producers: Brian Spear, Doug Walton, Sherali Najak
- 2008 World Junior Ice Hockey Championships Gold Final – TSN. Producers: Jon Hynes, Jim Marshall
- NHL on TSN – Western Conference Semi Final Game 4: Detroit @ San Jose – TSN. Producers: Mitch Kerzner, Mark Milliere, Ken Volden

== Best Cross-Platform Project ==
- Race to Mars Interactive – Arte, Galafilm. Producers: Raja Khanna, Richard Lachman
- The Border Interactive – White Pine Pictures. Producers: Evan Jones, Peter Raymont, Julia Bennett
- Odd Job Jack – oddjobjack.com – Smiley Guy Studios. Producers: Adrian Carter, Denny Silverthorne, Jeremy Diamond, Jonas Diamond
- Urban Vermin – urbanvermin.com – Decode Entertainment. Producers: Beth Stevenson, Diana Arruda, Anne Loi, Clem Hobbs
- Anash Interactive – Reel Girls Media. Producer: Ava Karvonen

== Best Direction in a Dramatic Program or Mini-Series ==
- John N. Smith – The Englishman's Boy (Mind's Eye Entertainment)
- David Wellington – Would Be Kings (C.O.R.E./Norstar Entertainment)
- Ken Girotti – Mayerthorpe (Slanted Wheel Entertainment/Seven24 Films)
- Norma Bailey – The Capture of the Green River Killer (Julijette/Once Upon a Time Films)
- Charles Binamé – The Trojan Horse (Whizbang Films)

== Best Direction in a Dramatic Series ==
- Holly Dale – Durham County – What Lies Beneath (Muse Entertainment/Back Alley Film Productions)
- John Fawcett – The Border – Blowback (White Pine Pictures)
- James Allodi – ReGenesis – Unbottled (The Movie Network/Movie Central/Shaftesbury Films)
- Stephen Surjik – Intelligence – We Were Here Now We Disappear (Haddock Entertainment)
- Alison Maclean – The Tudors – Episode 108 (Peace Arch Entertainment/Reveille Productions/Working Title Films/Showtime Networks)

== Best Direction in a News Information Program or Series ==
- Litsa Sourtzis – Marketplace – Grey, Black and Blue (CBC)
- Jennifer Fowler – Marketplace – Product of Canada, Eh? (CBC)
- Mike Downie – Project X (CBC)
- Marie Caloz – the fifth estate – Teacher’s Pet (CBC)
- Claude Vickery – the fifth estate – Overboard (CBC)

== Best Direction in a Documentary Program ==
- Maya Gallus – Girl Inside (Red Queen Productions)
- Peter Raymont – A Promise to the Dead: The Exile Journey of Ariel Dorfman (White Pine Pictures)
- David Paperny – Confessions of an Innocent Man (NFB/Paperny Films)
- Nicholas de Pencier – Four Wings and a Prayer (Celluloid Dreams/Optix Digital Pictures/Primitive Entertainment)
- John Zaritsky – The Suicide Tourist (Point Grey Pictures/PBS/CTV)

== Best Direction in a Documentary Series ==
- Derreck Roemer, Neil Graham – The View from Here – Last Call at the Gladstone Hotel (TVOntario)
- Steven Silver – The Dark Years, Episode 1 (Barna-Alper Productions/NFB/History Television)
- Phyllis Ellis – Crystal: Living the Dream (Henry Less Productions)
- Leslie Lucas – Jetstream – Darkness Falls (Paperny Films)
- Denis Blaquière – Mars Rising – Search For Life (13 Productions, Galafilm)

== Best Direction in a Comedy Program or Series ==
- T. W. Peacocke – Rent-a-Goalie – Everybody’s A Fag (Eggplant Picture & Sound/Fifth Ground Entertainment/Georgian Entertainment)
- David Storey – Corner Gas – Bed and Brake Fast (CTV/Prairie Pants Productions)
- Henry Sarwer-Foner – Rick Mercer Report – Episode 16 (CBC/Island Edge)
- Jeff Beesley – Little Mosque on the Prairie – Eid's A Wonderful Life (WestWind Pictures)
- Brian K. Roberts – Little Mosque on the Prairie – Meet JJ (WestWind Pictures)

== Best Direction in a Variety Program or Series ==
- John Keffer – 2007 MuchMusic Video Awards (MuchMusic)
- Joel Stewart – Blue Rodeo: Small Miracles (CMT)
- Joel Stewart – My Song is My Gift: A George Canyon Christmas (Corkscrew Media)
- Larysa Fenyn – CBC Winnipeg Comedy Festival (CBC)
- Shelagh O'Brien – Words to Music: The Canadian Songwriters Hall of Fame 2008 (Cansong Productions)

== Best Direction in a Performing Arts Program or Series ==
- Dennis Beauchamp – Blood on the Moon (Bravo!/Chestnut Park Entertainment)
- Rosemary House – Christopher House: Ahead of the Curve (Rock Island Productions)
- Pierre Lamoureux, François Lamoureux – Cowboy Junkies: Trinity Revisited (FogoLabs)
- Byron McKim – Dancing with Spirit – Here on Earth (Soaring Heart Pictures)
- Byron McKim – Dancing with Spirit – Triptych (Soaring Heart Pictures)

== Best Direction in a Lifestyle/Practical Information Program or Series ==
- Michelle Métivier – Tribute Bands (CanWest MediaWorks)
- Heather McCrae – At the End of My Leash – In the Lap of Luxury (Purple Dog Media/White Iron Pictures)
- Jeff Semple – Ancestors in the Attic (Primitive Entertainment)
- Jim Kiriakakis – Rich Bride, Poor Bride – Stepping Into The Ring (Buck Productions)
- Les Stroud – Survivorman – Kalahari (Cream Productions/Wilderness Spirit Productions)

== Best Direction in a Reality Program or Series ==
- Shelagh O'Brien – Triple Sensation – Workshop Presentations, Finale (Tiberius Entertainment)
- Peter Rowe – Angry Planet (Pinewood Films)
- Paul Kilback – Shaye (Breakthrough Entertainment)
- Justin Harding – Keys to the VIP – Max vs Josh @ Mink Nightclub (Alpha Male Productions/Buck Productions/The Comedy Network)
- David Hoffert – Party Mamas – Kerrie (Barna-Alper Productions)

== Best Direction in an Animated Program or Series ==
- Pierre-Luc Granjon, Pascal le Nôtre – Leon in Wintertime (Divertissement Subséquence/Folimage/NFB)
- Robin Budd – Ruby Gloom – Hair(Less): The Musical, Part 1 (Nelvana)
- Rick Marshall – Peep and the Big Wide World – The Sounds of Silence (WGBH-TV/9 Story Entertainment/TVOntario/Discovery Kids/Eggbox/NFB)
- Vadim Kapridov – Futz! – Dancing with the Futz! (9 Story Entertainment)
- Jason Groh – My Friend Rabbit – Mouse's Moss, The Sound of Silence (Nelvana/Qubo)

== Best Direction in a Children's or Youth Program or Series ==
- Robert Daniel Pytlyk – Drug Class – Travis' Story (Cooper Rock)
- Philip Earnshaw – Degrassi: The Next Generation – Standing in the Dark, Part 1 (Bell Media/Epitome Pictures)
- Graeme Campbell – Instant Star – Celebrity Skin (DHX Media)
- Steve Diguer – Tumbletown Tales (TVOntario)
- Jeff Beesley – renegadepress.com – Cyber Sandbox (Vérité Films)

== Best Direction in a Live Sporting Event ==
- Ron Forsythe – CFL on CBC – 95th Grey Cup (CBC Sports)
- Chris Elias – 2008 Canadian Figure Skating Championships (CBC Sports)
- Paul Hemming – 2008 World Junior Ice Hockey Championships Gold Final (TSN)

== Best Writing in a Dramatic Program or Mini-Series ==
- Andrew Wreggitt – Mayerthorpe (Slanted Wheel Entertainment/Seven24 Films)
- Robert Wertheimer, Denis McGrath, Jocelyn Cornforth – Across the River to Motor City (Devine Entertainment/Jonsworth Productions)
- Esta Spalding, Tassie Cameron – Would Be Kings (C.O.R.E./Norstar Entertainment)
- Paul Gross, John Krizanc – The Trojan Horse (Whizbang Films)
- Gerald Wexler, Joe Wiesenfeld, Howard Wiseman – St. Urbain's Horseman (CBC/Galafilm)

== Best Writing in a Dramatic Series ==
- Laurie Finstad-Knizhnik – Durham County – What Lies Beneath (Muse Entertainment/Back Alley Film Productions)
- Janet Maclean – Murdoch Mysteries – Til Death Do Us Part (Shaftesbury Films/Rogers Media/UKTV)
- Michael Hirst – The Tudors – Episode 108 (Peace Arch Entertainment/Reveille Productions/Working Title Films/Showtime Networks)
- Meredith Vuchnich – ReGenesis – La Consecuencia (The Movie Network/Movie Central/Shaftesbury Films)
- Alan McCullough – Stargate Atlantis – Tabula Rasa (Acme Shark Productions/Sony Pictures Television)

== Best Writing in a Comedy or Variety Program or Series ==
- Brooks Gray, Andy King, Leo Scherman, Morgan Waters – Cock'd Gunns – Ready, Aim, Fire (Tricon Films & Television)
- Paul Mather, Greg Eckler, Chris Finn, Rick Mercer, Tim Steeves, Irwin Barker – Rick Mercer Report – Episode 8 (CBC/Island Edge)
- A.M. Reid, Max Reid – Billable Hours – One Hit Wonder (Shaw Media/Temple Street Productions)
- Graeme Manson – Rent-a-Goalie – Everybody’s A Fag (Eggplant Picture & Sound/Fifth Ground Entertainment/Georgian Entertainment)
- Jennifer Whalen, Gavin Crawford, Andrew Bush, Mark Critch, Nathan Fielder, Geri Hall, Albert Howell, Dean Jenkinson, Tim McAuliffe, Gary Pearson, Kyle Tingley – This Hour Has 22 Minutes – Episode 3 (Halifax Film Company/CBC)

== Best Writing in an Information Program or Series ==
- Barbara Shearer – Pretty Dangerous (Summerhill Entertainment)
- Gillian Findlay – the fifth estate – Overboard (CBC)
- Linden MacIntyre – the fifth estate – Brian Mulroney: The Unauthorized Chapter (CBC)
- Andrew Younghusband – Canada's Worst Driver – Road Test (Proper Television)
- Colin McNeil – Crime Stories – The Laser Man (Court TV/Harmony Entertainment/Partners in Motion)

== Best Writing in a Documentary Program or Series ==
- John Zaritsky, Terence McKeown – The Suicide Tourist (Point Grey Pictures/PBS/CTV)
- Neil Docherty – Frontline: Darfur: On Our Watch (PBS/CBC)
- Steve Lucas – The Dark Years, Episode 1 (Barna-Alper Productions/NFB/History Television)
- Paul Myers – Long John Baldry: In the Shadow of the Blues (Boogie Woogie Productions/BBC/CHUM Television/Knowledge Network/Soapbox Productions)
- Denis Blaquière – Mars Rising – Search For Life (13 Productions, Galafilm)

== Best Writing in a Children's or Youth's Program or Series ==
- Robert Pincombe, Karen Moonah, Shelley Hoffmann – Iggy Arbuckle – Idle Worship, Something About Berries (C.O.R.E./National Geographic Kids/Blueprint Entertainment)
- Bob McDonald – Heads Up! – What Will Cars Look Like In The Future? (Look Back Productions)
- Emily Andras – Instant Star – Like A Virgin (DHX Media)
- Dennis Jackson – Wapos Bay – The Guardians (Karma Film)
- Terry McGurrin – 6Teen – Silent Butt Deadly (Nelvana)

== Best Performance by an Actor in a Leading Role in a Dramatic Program or Mini-Series ==
- Nicholas Campbell – The Englishman's Boy (Mind's Eye Entertainment)
- Michael Eisner – The Englishman's Boy (Mind's Eye Entertainment)
- David Fox – Across the River to Motor City (Devine Entertainment/Jonsworth Productions)
- Ben Bass – Would Be Kings (C.O.R.E./Norstar Entertainment)
- Brian Markinson – Mayerthorpe (Slanted Wheel Entertainment/Seven24 Films)
- Henry Czerny – Mayerthorpe (Slanted Wheel Entertainment/Seven24 Films)

== Best Performance by an Actress in a Leading Role in a Dramatic Program or Mini-Series ==
- Natasha Henstridge – Would Be Kings (C.O.R.E./Norstar Entertainment)
- Megan Follows – Booky and the Secret Santa (Platt Productions, Shaftesbury Films)
- Rachel Marcus – Booky and the Secret Santa (Platt Productions, Shaftesbury Films)
- Jordy Benattar – Charlie & Me (Cypress Point Productions)
- Erica Durance – I Me Wed (Muse Entertainment/Sound Venture Productions)

== Best Performance by an Actor in a Continuing Leading Dramatic Role ==
- Louis Ferreira – Durham County – What Lies Beneath (Muse Entertainment/Back Alley Film Productions)
- James McGowan – The Border – Blowback (White Pine Pictures)
- Hugh Dillon – Durham County – Life in the Dollhouse (Muse Entertainment/Back Alley Film Productions)
- Peter Outerbridge – ReGenesis – TB or not TB (The Movie Network/Movie Central/Shaftesbury Films)
- Ian Tracey – Intelligence – A Dark Alliance (Haddock Entertainment)

== Best Performance by an Actress in a Continuing Leading Dramatic Role ==
- Hélène Joy – Durham County – Guys and Dolls (Muse Entertainment/Back Alley Film Productions)
- Camille Sullivan – Intelligence – A Man is Framed (Haddock Entertainment)
- Natalie Dormer – The Tudors – Episode 110 (Peace Arch Entertainment/Reveille Productions/Working Title Films/Showtime Networks)
- Jewel Staite – Stargate Atlantis – Missing (Acme Shark Productions/Sony Pictures Television)
- Kristin Booth – MVP – Sudden Death (Screen Door)

== Best Performance by an Actor in a Guest Role Dramatic Series ==
- Gavin Crawford – Murdoch Mysteries – Belly Speaker (Shaftesbury Films/Rogers Media/UKTV)
- Bayo Akinfemi – The Border – Family Values (White Pine Pictures)
- Dmitry Chepovetsky – Murdoch Mysteries – Power (Shaftesbury Films/Rogers Media/UKTV)
- Stephen McHattie – Murdoch Mysteries – Let Loose the Dogs (Shaftesbury Films/Rogers Media/UKTV)
- Vincent Walsh – Murdoch Mysteries – The Rebel and the Prince (Shaftesbury Films/Rogers Media/UKTV)

== Best Performance by an Actress in a Guest Role Dramatic Series ==
- Pascale Hutton – Intelligence – The Heat Is On (Haddock Entertainment)
- Karen LeBlanc – ReGenesis – Bloodless (The Movie Network/Movie Central/Shaftesbury Films)
- Kate Trotter – Murdoch Mysteries – Body Double (Shaftesbury Films/Rogers Media/UKTV)
- Gabrielle Anwar – The Tudors – Episode 104 (Peace Arch Entertainment/Reveille Productions/Working Title Films/Showtime Networks)
- Babz Chula – jPod (I'm Feeling Lucky Productions/No Equal Entertainment)

== Best Performance by an Actor in a Featured Supporting Role in a Dramatic Series ==
- Jonas Chernick – The Border – Civil Disobedience, Grave Concern (White Pine Pictures)
- Jonny Harris – Murdoch Mysteries – Power, Annoying Red Planet (Shaftesbury Films/Rogers Media/UKTV)
- Thomas Craig – Murdoch Mysteries – Glass Ceiling, Still Waters (Shaftesbury Films/Rogers Media/UKTV)
- Sam Neill – The Tudors – Episodes 108 & 110 (Peace Arch Entertainment/Reveille Productions/Working Title Films/Showtime Networks)
- Shaun Johnston – Heartland – Nothing Endures, Coming Together (Seven24 Films/Dynamo Films)

== Best Performance by an Actress in a Featured Supporting Role in a Dramatic Series ==
- Maria Doyle Kennedy – The Tudors – Episodes 105 & 108 (Peace Arch Entertainment/Reveille Productions/Working Title Films/Showtime Networks)
- Wendy Crewson – ReGenesis – Suspicious Minds, Unbottled (The Movie Network/Movie Central/Shaftesbury Films)
- Catherine Disher – The Border – Civil Disobedience, Enemy Contact (White Pine Pictures)
- Laurence Leboeuf – Durham County – The Dark Man, Life In The Dollhouse (Muse Entertainment/Back Alley Film Productions)
- Sonya Salomaa – Durham County – Lady Of The Lake, Life In The Dollhouse (Muse Entertainment/Back Alley Film Productions)

== Best Performance by an Actor in a Featured Supporting Role in a Dramatic Program or Mini-Series ==
- Peter MacNeill – Victor (Indian Grove Productions/Muse Entertainment/CBC)
- R. H. Thomson – The Englishman's Boy (Mind's Eye Entertainment)
- Ron Lea – Victor (Indian Grove Productions/Muse Entertainment/CBC)
- Saul Rubinek – The Trojan Horse (Whizbang Films)
- Michael Riley – St. Urbain's Horseman (CBC/Galafilm)

== Best Performance by an Actress in a Featured Supporting Role in a Dramatic Program or Mini-Series ==
- Katharine Isabelle – The Englishman's Boy (Mind's Eye Entertainment)
- Clare Stone – Would Be Kings (C.O.R.E./Norstar Entertainment)
- Andrea Martin – St. Urbain's Horseman (CBC/Galafilm)
- Nahanni Johnstone – Booky and the Secret Santa (Platt Productions, Shaftesbury Films)
- Cara Pifko – I Me Wed (Muse Entertainment/Sound Venture Productions)

== Best Individual Performance in a Comedy Program or Series ==
- Jo Koy – Just for Laughs Gala Series (Just for Laughs Comedy Festival/Les Films Rozon)
- Louis C.K. – Just for Laughs Gala Series (Just for Laughs Comedy Festival/Les Films Rozon)
- Ian Sirota – Comedy Inc., Episode 4.03 (SFA Productions)
- Natalie Brown – Sophie, Door Number Two
- Jon Dore – The Jon Dore Television Show (Insight Productions)

== Best Ensemble Performance in a Comedy Program or Series ==
- Brooks Gray, Inessa Frantowski, Andy King, Leo Scherman, Rebecca McMahon, Morgan Waters – Cock'd Gunns – A Taste of Success (Tricon Films & Television)
- Fab Filippo, David Alpay, Jennifer Baxter, Mike Beaver, Robin Brûlé, Jayne Eastwood, Ennis Esmer, Brandon Firla, Ron Gabriel, Peter Keleghan, Arnold Pinnock, Aron Tager – Billable Hours – Monopoly Man (Shaw Media/Temple Street Productions)
- John Catucci, David Mesiano – The Canadian Comedy Awards – Best of the Fest 2007
- Christopher Bolton, Stephen Amell, Oliver Becker, Michael Bodnar, Sarain Boylan, Inga Cadranel, Louis Di Bianco, Carlos Patricio Díaz, Gabriel Hogan, Mayko Nguyen, Rafael Petardi, Joe Pingue, Jeff Pustil, Philip Riccio, Maria Vacratsis, Jeremy Wright, Matt Gordon – Rent-a-Goalie – Domi Daze (Eggplant Picture & Sound/Fifth Ground Entertainment/Georgian Entertainment)
- Mark Critch, Gavin Crawford, Geri Hall, Cathy Jones – This Hour Has 22 Minutes – Episode 6 (Halifax Film Company/CBC)

== Best Performance or Host in a Variety Program or Series ==
- Russell Peters – Juno Awards of 2008 (Canadian Academy of Recording Arts and Sciences/CTV)
- Ermine Gittens, Lloyd Lawrence, Michelle Hanson, O’neil Watson, Roberta Baird, Andrea Hall, Teena Riley, Dione Taylor, Melissa Brown, Nadia Good, Lou Pomanti – Words to Music: The Canadian Songwriters Hall of Fame 2008 (Cansong Productions)
- Andrea Martin – CBC Winnipeg Comedy Festival (CBC)
- Janet van de Graaf, Ron Pardo, Peter Oldring, Rosa Labordé, Paul Braunstein, Bob Bainborough, Rick Green, Colin Mochrie – History Bites – Celine Dion (History Channel)
- Emilie-Claire Barlow, Vern Dorge, Lou Pomanti, Nevon Sinclair, Oliver Jones, Sharon Riley, Jean Lawrence, Shenelle Morgan – Words to Music: The Canadian Songwriters Hall of Fame 2008 (Cansong Productions)

== Best Performance in a Performing Arts Program or Series ==
- Natalie Merchant, Vic Chesnutt, Jeff Bird, Ryan Adams, Alan Anton, Peter Timmins, Michael Timmins, Margo Timmins – Cowboy Junkies: Trinity Revisited (FogoLabs)
- Santee Smith, Emily Law, Alex Meraz, Brian Solomon – Dancing with Spirit (Soaring Heart Pictures)

== Best Individual or Ensemble Performance in an Animated Program or Series ==
- DeRic Starlight, Raven Brass, Eric Jackson, Taylor Cook, Andrea Menard, Lorne Cardinal, Gordon Tootoosis, Trevor Cameron – Wapos Bay – The Guardians (Karma Film)
- Jamie Watson – Peep and the Big Wide World – The Sounds of Silence (WGBH-TV/9 Story Entertainment/TVOntario/Discovery Kids/Eggbox/NFB)
- Brooke D'Orsay, Stacey DePass, Megan Fahlenbock, Terry McGurrin, Christian Potenza, Jess Gibbons – 6Teen – Silent Butt Deadly (Nelvana)
- David Berni, Jonathan Wilson – Iggy Arbuckle – Idle Worship, Something About Berries (C.O.R.E./National Geographic Kids/Blueprint Entertainment)
- Jeremy Harris, Sarah Gadon, Scott McCord, Stacey DePass, David Berni, Adrian Truss, Peter Keleghan, Emily Hampshire – Ruby Gloom – Hairless the Musical, Part 1 (Nelvana)

== Best Performance in a Children’s or Youth Program or Series ==
- Alexz Johnson – Instant Star – Let It Be (DHX Media)
- Lauren Collins – Degrassi: The Next Generation – Talking in Your Sleep (Bell Media/Epitome Pictures)
- Shane Kippel – Degrassi: The Next Generation – Death of Glory, Part 2 (Bell Media/Epitome Pictures)
- Ashley Leggat – *Life with Derek – Allergy Season (Shaftesbury Films/Pope Productions)
- Magda Apanowicz – renegadepress.com – Life Today (Vérité Films)

== Best Achievement in Casting ==
- Carmen Kotyk – The Englishman's Boy (Mind's Eye Entertainment)
- Randi Wells, Wendy O’Brien, Andrea Kenyon, Marissa Richmond – Durham County – What Lies Beneath (Muse Entertainment/Back Alley Film Productions)
- Deirdre Bowen – Murdoch Mysteries (Shaftesbury Films/Rogers Media/UKTV)
- Jenny Lewis, Sara Kay – Rent-a-Goalie (Eggplant Picture & Sound/Fifth Ground Entertainment/Georgian Entertainment)
- Susan Forrest, Rhonda Fisekci – Mayerthorpe (Slanted Wheel Entertainment/Seven24 Films)

== Best News Anchor ==
- Ian Hanomansing – CBC News Vancouver (CBC)
- Peter Mansbridge – The National/CBC News (CBC)
- Kevin Newman – Global National (Global)

== Best Reportage ==
- Adrienne Arsenault, Richard Devey, Erin Boudreau – The National/CBC News (CBC)
- Maureen Taylor – The National/CBC News (CBC)
- Frédéric Zalac – The National/CBC News (CBC)

== Best Host or Interviewer in a News Information Program or Series ==
- Hana Gartner – the fifth estate – The Lady Vanishes (CBC)
- Wendy Mesley – Marketplace (CBC)
- Linden MacIntyre – the fifth estate – Bad Day in Barrhead (CBC)
- Gillian Findlay – the fifth estate – Overboard (CBC)
- Steve Paikin – The Agenda – Mark Steyn's Muslim Problem (TVOntario)

== Best Host or Interviewer in a General/Human Interest or Talk Program or Series ==
- George Stroumboulopoulos – George Stroumboulopoulos Tonight (CBC)
- Jeff Douglas – Ancestors in the Attic (Primitive Entertainment)
- Les Stroud – Survivorman – Kalahari (Cream Productions/Wilderness Spirit Productions)
- Peter Mansbridge – Mansbridge One on One (CBC)
- Jeff Douglas – Working Over Time (History Television)

== Best Host in a Lifestyle/Practical Information, or Performing Arts Program or Series ==
- Bryan Baeumler – Disaster DIY – Kitchen Attack!, Loomer (Si Entertainment)
- George Kourounis – Angry Planet (Pinewood Films)
- Bob Blumer – Glutton for Punishment – Guinness Diet (Paperny Films)
- Wendy Russell – She's Crafty – Kitschy Kool (Omnifilm Entertainment)
- Bruce Turner – Style By Jury – A Shelter From The Storm (Planetworks)
- Candice Olson – Divine Design – Audrey's Office (Fusion Television)

== Best Host in a Pre-School, Children's or Youth Program or Series ==
- Bob McDonald – Heads Up! – What Will Cars Look Like In The Future? (Look Back Productions)
- Joe MacLeod – Ghost Trackers – Terror in the Tunnel: Castle Loma Coach House (CCI Entertainment)
- André Simoneau – Prank Patrol – Principal's Office (Apartment 11 Productions)
- Patty Sullivan – Kids Canada – I Care (CBC)
- Mark Sykes – Mark’s Moments (TVOntario)

== Best Host or Interviewer in a Sports Program or Sportscast ==
- Ron MacLean – Hockey Night in Canada – Hockey Day in Canada (CBC Sports)
- James Duthie – NHL on TSN – TradeCentre '08 (TSN)
- Scott Russell – 2007 FIFA U-20 World Cup – Final Game (CBC Sports)

== Best Sports Play-by-Play Announcer ==
- Don Wittman – Hockey Night in Canada – New York Rangers @ Ottawa Senators (CBC Sports)
- Gord Miller – 2008 World Junior Ice Hockey Championships Gold Final (TSN)
- Rob Faulds – LPGA: CN Canadian Women's Open (Sportsnet)

== Best Game Analyst ==
- Pierre McGuire – 2008 World Junior Ice Hockey Championships Gold Final (TSN)
- Craig Simpson – Hockey Night in Canada – Edmonton Oilers @ Vancouver Canucks (CBC Sports)
- Tracy Wilson – 2008 Canadian Figure Skating Championships (CBC Sports)

== Best Studio Sports Analyst ==
- Bob McKenzie – 2008 World Junior Ice Hockey Championships Gold Final (TSN)
- Mike Milbury – NHL on TSN (TSN)

== Best Photography in a Dramatic Program or Series ==
- Ousama Rawi – The Tudors – Episode 106 (Peace Arch Entertainment/Reveille Productions/Working Title Films/Showtime Networks)
- Steve Cosens – Durham County – Divide & Conquer (Muse Entertainment/Back Alley Film Productions)
- David Perrault – Murdoch Mysteries – Annoying Red Planet (Shaftesbury Films/Rogers Media/UKTV)
- Pierre Letarte – The Englishman's Boy (Mind's Eye Entertainment)
- David Greene – Across the River to Motor City (Devine Entertainment/Jonsworth Productions)
- Derick V. Underschultz – The Trojan Horse (Whizbang Films)

== Best Photography in a Comedy, Variety, Performing Arts Program or Series ==
- Michael Tien – Blood on the Moon (Bravo!/Chestnut Park Entertainment)
- Jim Jeffrey – Rent-a-Goalie – Gazebo (Eggplant Picture & Sound/Fifth Ground Entertainment/Georgian Entertainment)
- Ken Krawczyk – Corner Gas – Buzz Driver (CTV Television Network/Prairie Pants Productions)
- John McCullagh, Eugene O’Connor – Cowboy Junkies: Trinity Revisited (FogoLabs)
- Jim Westenbrink – Da Kink in My Hair – Chicken (Barna-Alper Productions/Defiant Entertainment/Ngozika Productions/Novelette's Productions/Trey Anthony Productions)

== Best Photography in an Information Program or Series ==
- Andre Dupuis – Departures – India: Quest for the Himalayas
- Paul Seeler – the fifth estate – Life and Death in Kandahar (CBC)
- Ian Kerr – She's Crafty – Kitschy Kool (Omnifilm Entertainment)
- Anton Van Rooyen – Who Do You Think You Are? – Chantal Kreviazuk (Barna-Alper Productions)
- Henry Less – French Food at Home (Ocean Entertainment)

== Best Photography in a Documentary Program or Series ==
- Mike Sheerin – Bravo Company: Kandahar (90th Parallel Productions)
- Étienne Carton de Grammont – Four Wings and a Prayer (Celluloid Dreams/Optix Digital Pictures/Primitive Entertainment)
- Bill Metcalfe – Doc Zone – Dubai – Miracle or Mirage? (CBC)
- John Collins, John Westheuser – Jetstream – Darkness Falls (Paperny Films)
- Stephane Ricard, André Perron – What's That About? (Pixcom)
- Martin Julian, Mike Carling – The Protestant Revolution (IWC Media)

== Best Visual Effects ==
- Bill Halliday, Bo Mosley, Lisa Carr-Harris, Warren J.W. Leathem, Bret Culp, Bob Munroe, Terry Bradley – The Tudors – Episode 110 (Peace Arch Entertainment/Reveille Productions/Working Title Films/Showtime Networks)
- Terry Hutcheson, Dave McGhie, Shawn Tilling, Mark T. Reid – Luna: Spirit of the Whale (Screen Siren Pictures)
- Megumi Kanazawa, Robert Crowther, Hojin Park, Thomas Turnbull, Andrew Nguyen, David Lamb, Ian Britton, Matt Hansen – Murdoch Mysteries – Power (Shaftesbury Films/Rogers Media/UKTV)
- Nik Slotiuk, Mark Savela, Shannon Gurney, Marco Checa Garcia, Aaron Kramer, Ray Van Steenwyk, Paul Hegg, Brandon Hines, Toby Taplin, Sebastian Greese – Stargate Atlantis – Missing (Acme Shark Productions/Sony Pictures Television)
- Bruce Woloshyn, Simon Ager, Daniel Rubin, Abel Milanes, Christine Petrov, Peter Hunt, Wes Sargent, Chad Lee Fox – The Guard – Waheguru (Brightlight Pictures/Halifax Film Company)

== Best Picture Editing in a Dramatic Program or Series ==
- Christopher Donaldson – The Border – Grave Concern (White Pine Pictures)
- Teresa De Luca – *Durham County – What Lies Beneath (Muse Entertainment/Back Alley Film Productions)
- Lisa Grootenboer – The Tudors – Episode 110 (Peace Arch Entertainment/Reveille Productions/Working Title Films/Showtime Networks)
- Jackie Dzuba – The Englishman's Boy (Mind's Eye Entertainment)
- James Bredin – Victor (Indian Grove Productions/Muse Entertainment/CBC)

== Best Picture Editing in a Comedy, Variety, Performing Arts Program or Series ==
- Vanda Schmockel – Corner Gas – Contagious Fortune (CTV Television Network/Prairie Pants Productions)
- Yves Dion – Cowboy Junkies: Trinity Revisited (FogoLabs)
- Alan MacLean, Miles Davren – Rick Mercer Report – Episode 12 (CBC/Island Edge)
- Keith Bradley – 2008 East Coast Music Awards (East Coast Music Association/CBC)
- Nico Stagias – Christopher House: Ahead of the Curve (Rock Island Productions)

== Best Picture Editing in an Information Program or Series ==
- Avi Lev – the fifth estate – Overboard (CBC)
- Glenn Sakatch – *At the End of My Leash – Pretty in Pink (Purple Dog Media/White Iron Pictures)
- Jacques Milette – Project X (CBC)
- Andrew Adolphus – Party Mamas – Emily (Barna-Alper Productions)
- Joshua Eady – Departures – India: Quest for the Himalayas

== Best Picture Editing in a Documentary Program or Series ==
- Roderick Deogrades – 100 Films and a Funeral (Documentary Channel/Markham Street Films/Sundance TV)
- Carmen Pollard – Citizen Sam (NFB)
- Gil Tétreault – Doc Zone – Battle of the Bag (CBC)
- Howard Wirth – Hunting the Predators (CBC)
- Geoff Rayes – Lives That Changed the World: Nelson Mandela (Nine Lives Productions)
- Tim Wanlin – True Pulp Murder – 99 Bottles of Beer (Make Believe Media)

== Best Production Design or Art Direction in a Non-Fiction Program or Series ==
- Peter Faragher – Juno Awards of 2008 (Canadian Academy of Recording Arts and Sciences/CTV)
- Michael Spike Parks – 2007 MuchMusic Video Awards (MuchMusic)
- Tim Luke – Forensic Factor – Dead Man’s Hollow (Exploration Production)
- John Dondertman – Mob Stories II – Unto The Son (MDF Productions)
- Michael Spike Parks – 22nd Gemini Awards (Academy of Canadian Cinema & Television/CBC))

== Best Production Design or Art Direction in a Fiction Program or Series ==
- Eliza Solesbury, Tom Conroy – The Tudors – Episode 106 (Peace Arch Entertainment/Reveille Productions/Working Title Films/Showtime Networks)
- Sara McCudden, Kathy McCoy – The Englishman's Boy (Mind's Eye Entertainment)
- Rocco Matteo – Across the River to Motor City (Devine Entertainment/Jonsworth Productions)
- John Blackie – Mayerthorpe (Slanted Wheel Entertainment/Seven24 Films)
- John Dondertman – The Trojan Horse (Whizbang Films)

== Best Costume Design ==
- Beverley Wowchuk – The Englishman's Boy (Mind's Eye Entertainment)
- Janet Campbell – Durham County – What Lies Beneath (Muse Entertainment/Back Alley Film Productions)
- Joan Bergin – The Tudors – Episode 103 (Peace Arch Entertainment/Reveille Productions/Working Title Films/Showtime Networks)
- Patricia J. Henderson – The Capture of the Green River Killer (Julijette/Once Upon a Time Films)
- Resa McConaghy – Little Mosque on the Prairie – Five Year Plan (WestWind Pictures)

== Best Achievement in Make-Up ==
- Ryan Reed, Shauna Llewellyn – Da Kink in My Hair – Di Heart of Di Matter (Barna-Alper Productions/Defiant Entertainment/Ngozika Productions/Novelette's Productions/Trey Anthony Productions)
- Debi Drennan – Murdoch Mysteries – The Rebel and the Prince (Shaftesbury Films/Rogers Media/UKTV)
- Rachel Affolter – ReGenesis – The Truth (The Movie Network/Movie Central/Shaftesbury Films)
- Tracy George, Tamara Harrod – The Englishman's Boy (Mind's Eye Entertainment)
- Marilyn O’Quinn – Would Be Kings (C.O.R.E./Norstar Entertainment)
- Leah Ehman, Todd Masters – Stargate Atlantis – The Last Man (Acme Shark Productions/Sony Pictures Television)

== Best Sound in a Dramatic Program ==
- Andrew Tay, Stephen Barden, Eric Fitz, Nelson Ferreira, Steve Baine, Alex Bullick – Across the River to Motor City (Devine Entertainment/Jonsworth Productions)
- Peter Clements, Martin Lee, Virginia Storey, John Dykstra, Sue Conley, Robert Warchol – Would Be Kings (C.O.R.E./Norstar Entertainment)
- Stephen Marian, Steve Hammond, Janice Ierulli, Mark Shnuriwsky, Alan deGraaf, John Gare – Booky and the Secret Santa (Platt Productions, Shaftesbury Films)

== Best Sound in a Dramatic Series ==
- Mario Auclair, Brad Thornton, Jill Purdy, Keith Elliott, Andrea Higgins, Lee de Lang – What Lies Beneath – Durham County (Muse Entertainment/Back Alley Film Productions)
- Ron Osiowy, Paul Shubat, Steve Foster, Kevin Howard, Rob Hegedus, Sid Lieberman – Heartland (Seven24 Films/Dynamo Films)
- Don Mann, Stephen Cheung, Greg Stewart, Murray Forward, Jeff Jackman, Ken Biehl – jPod (I'm Feeling Lucky Productions/No Equal Entertainment)
- Stefan Fraticelli, Herwig Gayer, Ian Rodness, Steve Payne, Alastair Gray, Richard Harkness – The Border – Family Values (White Pine Pictures)
- Kelly Cole, Anke Bakker, Kris Fenske, Bill Mellow, James Fonnyadt, Kevin Townshend – The Guard – Waheguru (Brightlight Pictures/Halifax Film Company)

== Best Sound in a Comedy, Variety, or Performing Arts Program or Series ==
- Brian Mercier, Denis Normandeau, François Lamoureux – Cowboy Junkies: Trinity Revisited (FogoLabs)
- Steven Budd, Anthony Montano – Ashley MacIsaac: Live at the Rehearsal Hall (Bravo!)
- Wayne Parsons, Shane Hayden, Brian Power, Kenny MacDonald – East Coast Sessions (CBC)
- Bob Doble, Francesco Russo, John Iaquinta – My Song is My Gift: A George Canyon Christmas (Corkscrew Media)
- Brian Mercier, Denis Normandeau, François Lamoureux – Sharing Christmas with John McDermott and Friends (Fogolabs)

== Best Sound in an Information/Documentary Program or Series ==
- Mark Gingras, Andrew Tay, Ian Dunbar – Triple Sensation (Tiberius Entertainment)
- Joe Passaretti, Damian Kearns – the fifth estate – Life and Death in Kandahar (CBC)
- Stuart French, Alan Geldart, Ron Searles – The Nature of Things – Geologic Journey: The Great Lakes CBC)
- Michael B. Bordeleau, Louis Gignac, Hans Laitress – Race to Mars (Galafilm)
- Steve Cupani – The Confidential Series (CBC)

== Best Original Music Score for a Program or Series ==
- Robert Carli – Murdoch Mysteries – Bad Medicine (Shaftesbury Films/Rogers Media/UKTV)
- Mark Korven – The Border – Enemy Contact (White Pine Pictures)
- Gary Koftinoff – Life with Derek – Fright Night (Shaftesbury Films/Pope Productions)
- James Jandrisch – The Guard – Waheguru (Brightlight Pictures/Halifax Film Company)
- James Jandrisch – Blood Ties – Deep Dark (Insight Productions/CHUM Television)

== Best Original Music for a Dramatic Program, Mini-Series or TV Movie ==
- Robert Carli – Victor (Indian Grove Productions/Muse Entertainment/CBC)
- Alex Khaskin, Ken Worth – Across the River to Motor City (Devine Entertainment/Jonsworth Productions)
- James Gelfand – St. Urbain's Horseman (CBC/Galafilm)

== Best Original Music Score for a Documentary Program or Series ==
- Mark Korven – A Promise to the Dead: The Exile Journey of Ariel Dorfman (White Pine Pictures)
- John Lang, Aaron Davis – Doc Zone – How to Stop a Hurricane (CBC)
- Ken Myhr – The Nature of Things – Geologic Journey: The Great Lakes CBC)
- David Klotz, Guy Zerafa – The Rape of Nanking (Real to Reel Productions/Toronto Alpha)
- Jim McGrath – The Climb (Nomad Films)

== Best Original Music for a Lifestyle/Practical Information or Reality Program or Series ==
- David Krain – Mantracker (Bonterra Productions)
- Shawn Pierce – Recreating Eden – A Life in a Landscape (Merit Motion Pictures)
- Carlos Lopes – Project X (CBC)
- Dan Colomby, Peter Cliche – Survivorman – The Amazon (Cream Productions/Wilderness Spirit Productions)
- Serge Côté – A World of Wonders (Genuine Pictures)

== Best Original Music Score for an Animated Program or Series ==
- Carolyn Hay, Ray Parker, Tom Szczesniak – Ruby Gloom – Hairless the Musical, Part 1 (Nelvana)
- Denis L. Chartrand, Normand Roger – Leon in Wintertime (Divertissement Subséquence/Folimage/NFB)
- Robert Buckley – Storm Hawks – Storm Warning (Nerd Corps Entertainment)
- Daniel Scott – Toopy and Binoo – Binoo the Brave (Spectra Animation)
- Ari Posner, Ian LeFeuvre – Johnny Test – Johnny vs. Bling-Bling 3, Stinkin' Johnny (Warner Bros. Television Studios)

== Special awards ==
- Gemini’s Hottest Star – Leah Miller (female), Brendan Fehr (male)
- Gordon Sinclair Award for Broadcast Journalism – Don Newman
- Earle Grey Award – David Gardner
- Canada Award: Kent Martin, Mark Sandiford – Qallunaat! Why White People Are Funny (Beachwalker Films/NFB)
- Margaret Collier Award: David Cole
- Gemini Humanitarian Award – Gord Martineau
