= Tyler Kyte =

Canadian actor and musician

- Kyte in September 2008

Background information
- Born: Jonathan Tyler Kyte
- Origin: Lindsay, Ontario, Canada
- Genre: Indie music
- Occupations: Singer, actor
- Instruments: Guitar, Piano, Drum
- Years active: 1997–present
- Label: Orange
- Website: www.myspace.com/tylerkyte

Jonathan Tyler Kyte is a Canadian actor and musician. He began his acting career with commercials and performing in the Musical Tommy in Toronto and was a correspondent on the Canadian TV series Popular Mechanics for Kids. He later appeared on the TV series Goosebumps (1997) and Are You Afraid of the Dark? (1999). He appeared in the made-for-TV movie Prom Queen: The Marc Hall Story in 2004, and had a recurring role on the Canadian drama Instant Star as Vincent Spiederman until 2008.

== Music ==
Kyte released an EP, Let's Talk EP. The EP has 5 original songs, written and performed by Kyte. Kyte played a rock star on the show Instant Star (for 4 seasons) where he was the guitarist for the backup band for Jude Harrison (Alexz Johnson). A version of his song "What You Need" is on the Songs From Instant Star Three soundtrack, along with two songs that were performed by Johnson on the show. Tyler also performs a song, "Remind Yourself", on the fourth season of Instant Star, which is featured on the soundtrack, Songs From Instant Star Four.

Tyler's debut CD, is called Talking Pictures contains some remastered versions of the songs from the Let's Talk EP.

Kyte is in the band Blue Fox (with Nick Rose and Ryan O'Reilly), and the band Sweet Thing. He also toured throughout Europe with The Ryan O'Reilly Band. He plays guitar, mandolin, and piano as well as providing backing vocals in Blue Fox, The Ryan O'Reilly Band and the drums for Sweet Thing. Kyte also plays with an ensemble collective Dwayne Gretzky.

=== Discography ===
Let's Talk EP (Lefthook Entertainment, 2006)

This EP has 5 original songs, written and performed by Tyler Kyte:

1. Let's Talk (Tyler Kyte/Jesse Labelle) – 4:14
2. What You Need (T. Kyte/Dave Thomson) – 3:48
3. Sarah (T. Kyte) – 4:50
4. Some Things Are Better Left Alone (T. Kyte/D. Thomson) – 4:06
5. Soft Spoken (T. Kyte) – 4:24

Sweet Thing EP (indie, 2006)

Kyte recorded drums on the 5 songs.

Don't Feel Cold (Questionable Records, 2006)

Kyte cowrote and recorded 1 song ("Making You Happy") w/ Ryan O'Reilly.

Songs From Instant Star Three (Orange Record Label, 2006–2007)

This soundtrack has 3 songs performed by Kyte, including a song from his EP "What You Need".

Blue Fox EP (Canterbury Music, 2007)

Kyte cowrote and recorded backing vocals, guitar, and piano for these 5 songs.

The Cloverhill EP (Rogue Studio, 2008)

EP by Nick Rose.

Songs From Instant Star Four (Orange Record Label, 2008)

This soundtrack has 1 song ("Remind Yourself") performed by Kyte.

Talking Pictures (Orange Record Label, 2008)

The debut solo album for Kyte, includes 10 tracks.

Sweet Thing (EMI Canada, 2010)

Kyte cowrote 3 tracks and recorded drums and backing vocals

Tyler Kyte and the Nice Guys 2014

== Acting ==
=== Young roles ===
Kyte roles during his younger years include Goosebumps, Popular Mechanics for Kids, Due South, The Defenders: Payback, Are You Afraid of the Dark, Interstate 60 and Darcy's Wild life. Kyte's first role was in Goosebumps' "Don't Go To Sleep" as Matt Amsterdam, a boy tired of being young who, after sleeping in his attic one night, wakes up in another dimension. In 1998, Kyte appeared in the children's show Popular Mechanics for Kids. His role in PMK landed him a nomination in 2001 at the Geminis, "Best Performance in a Children's or Youth Program or Series".

=== Adult roles ===
In 2003, Tyler played Charles Smart in the movie The Elizabeth Smart Story. The movie is based on the true story of Elizabeth Smart's kidnapping. Later in 2004, Kyte took a role in the movie, Prom Queen: The Marc Hall Story.

== Credits ==
=== Television ===
Year	Title	Role	Notes
1997	Goosebumps (1995 TV series)	Matt Amsterdam	Episode "Don't Go to Sleep"
1998–2000	Popular Mechanics for Kids	Himself	1998–2000
1999	Are You Afraid of the Dark?	Alan	
2001	Interstate 60	Philip	Small Role
2003	The Elizabeth Smart Story	Charles Smart	AKA: Kidnapped: The Elizabeth Smart Story
2004	Darcy's Wild Life	Tyler	Guest Role
2004	White Out	Craig	
2004	Prom Queen: The Marc Hall Story	Murray	
2004–2008	Instant Star	Vincent Speiderman	Main Role
2006	By Charlie Walker	Charlie Walker	Lead Role
2006	The Morgan Waters Show	Tyler the bear	Guest Role
2006	The Morgan Waters Show	Bad News Bear	Guest Role
2006	The Morgan Waters Show	Pickles and Chowmane guy	Guest Role
2006	Screwed Over	Himself	Guest Role
2007	Cock'd Gunns	Jay T	Guest Role
2008	The Latest Buzz	Brock Ravage	Guest Role
2008	Murdoch Mysteries	Clyde Dunbar	Guest Role
2010	Degrassi Takes Manhattan	Himself	Guest Role
2011	Alphas	Busker on subway	Guest Role
2021	Spin	DJ Luka Cent	Guest Role
