= Victor (2008 film) =

2008 Canadian television film

- Genre: Drama; Biography
- Written by: Mark Lutz
- Directed by: Jerry Ciccoritti
- Starring: Mark Lutz; Ron Lea; Peter MacNeill; Polly Shannon
- Theme music composer: Robert Carli
- Country of origin: Canada
- Original language: English

Production
- Producer: Bernard Zukerman
- Cinematography: Gerald Packer
- Editor: James Bredin
- Production companies: Indian Grove Productions; Muse Entertainment Enterprises

Original release
- Network: CBC Television
- Release: January 13, 2008

Victor is a Canadian television film, directed by Jerry Ciccoritti and broadcast by CBC Television in 2008. Written by and starring Mark Lutz, the film is a biographical drama about the life and career of Victor Davis, a Canadian Olympic swimmer who was killed in a hit and run accident just months after his retirement from competitive swimming.

The film's cast also included Polly Shannon as Davis's girlfriend Donna Clavel, Peter MacNeill as his father Mel Davis, Ron Lea as his friend Clifford Barry, Chris Owens as his friend Dave Stubbs and Sasha Roiz as his teammate Alex Baumann, as well as Lynne Cormack, Debra McCabe, R.D. Reid, Adam MacDonald, Jef Mallory, Amy Lalonde, Linda Prystawska, Devin Delorme, Glen Oomen, John Stoneham Sr., Larry Yachimec and Paula Rivera in supporting roles.

The film was broadcast on January 13, 2008.

== Awards ==
Award	Date of ceremony	Category	Nominees	Result	Reference
Gemini Awards	November 28, 2008	Best TV Movie	Bernard Zukerman	Nominated	
Gemini Awards	November 28, 2008	Best Actor in a TV Film or Miniseries	Ron Lea	Nominated	
Gemini Awards	November 28, 2008	Best Supporting Actor in a TV Film or Miniseries	Peter MacNeill	Won	
Gemini Awards	November 28, 2008	Best Original Music in a Dramatic Program, Mini-Series or TV Movie	Robert Carli	Won	
Gemini Awards	November 28, 2008	Best Picture Editing in a Dramatic Program or Series	James Bredin	Nominated	
Directors Guild of Canada	2007	Direction in a Television Movie/Mini-Series	Jerry Ciccoritti	Nominated	
Directors Guild of Canada	2007	Sound Editing in a Television Movie/Mini-Series	Sue Conley, Jane Tattersall, Robert Warchol, Jean Bot	Nominated	
