= The Panic Zone =

2010 novel by Rick Mofina

- Author: Rick Mofina
- Series: A Jack Gannon novel
- Genre: Thriller
- Publisher: Mira Books
- Publication date: June 29, 2010
- Publication place: Canada
- Media type: Print (Paperback)
- Pages: 416
- ISBN: 0-7783-2794-9
- Preceded by: Vengeance Road

The Panic Zone is a thriller novel by Canadian author Rick Mofina released on June 30, 2010. It is a Globe and Mail Canadian bestseller.

== Critical reception ==
Dean Koontz calls The Panic Zone "a headlong rush toward Armageddon."

Cheryl Tardif, a fellow suspense author, calls the book "gripping and mesmerizing from the very first chapter. With a storytelling talent comparative to Michael Crichton and Robert Ludlum, Mofina expertly weaves the plot with intricate, terrifying and believable details."

Larry W. Chavis of Crimespace says the book "takes the standard world-in-danger device of the genre to a higher level, at times leaving the reader breathless at its implications."
