= Field Day (band) =

Canadian pop-punk band from Calgary formed in 1994

- Origin: Calgary, Alberta, Canada
- Genres: Pop punk Punk rock
- Years active: 1994–2000; 2004
- Labels: Lethal Records, Devil Doll Records, Cargo Records, Onefoot Records
- Past members: John Hiebert; Jay Kreway; Jonas Smith; Brock McAndless; Roger Nilson; Paul Gerber

Field Day was a Canadian pop-punk band from Calgary formed in 1994. The band's original lineup consisted of guitarist and singer John Hiebert, drummer Jay Kreway (who were both members of the Calgary punk band "Ninth Configuration") along with bassist Jonas Smith (also known as Joner Baloner).

== Background ==
After a number of local cassette and EP releases, the band released their first full-length album Friction on September 29, 1995, on Lethal Records, a label in Long Beach, California. Two songs from the album scored soundtrack appearances. Hiebert's "Denial" is on the soundtrack for the movie National Lampoon's Senior Trip, while the Jonas Smith-penned single "Enough for Two" and its B-side "Other Guy" were both featured on the soundtrack for the Canadian independent film The Suburbanators. The album was co-produced by the band and Jeff Burns; it was a moderate success in Canada, spawning two Much Music-aired videos and charting in the top 50 on the Canadian College Charts.

Shortly afterwards the band split with Lethal after the label sold Field Day's rights to their own publishing profits. In 1996, they released their second album Big Wheels on Montreal label Cargo Records and played on the Canadian leg of the Vans Warped Tour in Toronto and Montreal. In 1997, the band played again on the Vans Warped Tour in Vancouver, British Columbia. After the Warped Tour, Field Day signed with Devil Doll Records and released Emerald and Jaded on June 24, 1997. Emerald and Jaded was a combination of songs which appeared on Friction and Big Wheels. Smith left the band in August 1997 to move to Brazil. He was replaced by bassist Roger Nilson. In 2000, the band again played the Warped Tour in Calgary and released a new album of original material recorded at Calgary's Sundae Sound studios. The album was called The Dawn of a New Day and was released on August 8, 2000. The Dawn of a New Day featured new bassist Brock McAndless and featured guests Doug Bevans (The Smalls), Bob Keelaghan (Puritans), and Chris Temple (Earthquake Pills, Wagbeard). The album was co-produced, engineered and mixed by Dave Alcock of Chixdiggit. McAndless quit after recording the album and was replaced by Steve Elaschuk.

After touring behind The Dawn of a New Day, the band split up. In the early 2000s, Jay Kreway toured with The Burnettes, The Sleepers, and The Great Evil with Chris Temple. He also started Huntington Homes, his own house framing company. Hiebert managed and booked bands for the Castle Pub in Calgary. In May 2004, the band briefly reunited with a second guitarist (Paul Gerber) for an eight-date tour through western Canada with Burn the 8 Track, a band from Winnipeg, Manitoba. At the time Hiebert was interviewed by Edmonton, Alberta news and entertainment newspaper Vue Weekly. He expressed interest in recording a new EP for release later that year, as well as re-issuing the band's back catalogue. In October 2007, Field Day reunited to play one show as part of Castlefest, a series of shows that took place prior to the closing of the Castle Pub in Calgary.

In 2009, Smith returned to the music scene with the independent self-titled album JJS3. JJS3 is a one-man band with all songwriting and instrumentation performed by Smith. The name of the new project comes from Smith's full name–Jonas J. Smith III. Since leaving Field Day, Smith had traveled before settling in Whitehorse, Yukon, where he works at local venue Coasters booking entertainment.

== Music videos ==
The video for the song "Enough for Two" received airplay on Canadian music video station Much Music. Videos for the songs "Denial" and "Big Wheels" were directed by Matthew Kershaw.

== Discography ==
- Pet (1992)
- Hot Wax (1994)
- Friction (1995)
- Big Wheels (1996)
- Emerald and Jaded (1997)
- Menage a Trois Split EP with Mandingo and Nooner (1999)
- The Dawn of a New Day (2000)
