= Sweet Thing (band) =

Canadian alternative rock band

- Origin: Toronto, Ontario, Canada
- Genre: Alternative Rock
- Years active: 2005–2011
- Label: EMI
- Members: Owen Carrier; Nick Rose; Alex Winter; Morgan Waters; Tyler Kyte
- Past members: Tim Nussey

Sweet Thing was a Canadian alternative rock band based in Toronto who have been signed to EMI Music Canada since 2008. They are best known for their singles "Dance Mother" and "Change of Seasons".

A demo version of "Change of Seasons" is featured in the teen comedy film Easy A.

== History ==
Band members are originally from Ottawa and Lindsay, Ontario, and Victoria, British Columbia. Bassist Morgan Waters, guitarist Nick Rose, and drummer Tyler Kyte all had acting careers in Canada prior to the formation of Sweet Thing. (Waters won two Gemini Awards for the television series Cock'd Gunns and one for The Morgan Waters Show.) The band took their name from the song by Van Morrison. They cite such influences as The Beatles, The Band, Stevie Wonder, Creedence Clearwater Revival, Michael Jackson, Sloan, and Ted Leo. They worked with producer Rob Schnapf (Elliott Smith, Beck) in Los Angeles for their debut album. Billboard wrote that the album "is full of chiming guitars and chugging rhythms, recalling other guitar-based groups searching for a danceable groove like Franz Ferdinand." Critic Ben Rayner of the Toronto Star wrote, " 'Lazy Susan' and 'Lorraine' prance like Spoon after a '70s soft-rock bender, while 'Winter Night' makes a run for the children-of-Coldplay club and succeeds with a smashingly universal and emotive girly-boy chorus."

Sweet Thing toured Canada in 2010 to promote their debut album.

== Band members ==
- Owen Carrier – lead vocals
- Nick Rose – guitar, vocals
- Alex Winter – guitar
- Morgan Waters – bass guitar
- Tyler Kyte – drums

== Discography ==
- 2006: Sweet Thing – EP
  - Track listing
    1. "Change of seasons" -Demo
    2. "Winter Night" -Demo
    3. "Kite Fight" -Demo
    4. "Everyone"
    5. "down to the ground"

- 2010: Sweet Thing
  - Track listing
    1. "Change of Seasons"
    2. "Lazy Susan"
    3. "Gun"
    4. "Winter Night"
    5. "Over Me"
    6. "Dance Mother"
    7. "Spider"
    8. "Lorraine"
    9. "Duotang"
    10. "Kite Fight"
    11. "We're on Fire Tonight"
    12. "Please"

- Produced and mixed by Rob Schnapf
- Engineered and mixed by Doug Boehm
