= Alix MacDonald =

Canadian TV producer and writer

Alix MacDonald is a Canadian TV producer, writer, and director who is primarily known for work in factual television. MacDonald has been nominated for and won several television awards. She is best known for her Canadian Screen Award winning show, Disasters at Sea.

== Career ==
MacDonald studied arts at the University of Toronto. She began her career in the early 1990s with CTV News. In the mid-1990s, she transitioned to factual television by joining Daily Planet as a producer. Since then, MacDonald has produced numerous Canadian factual television programs.

== Awards ==
=== Television ===
| Title | Year | Role | Awards and nominations |
|---|---|---|---|
| Disasters at Sea | 2018–2020 | Producer | Canadian Screen Award for Best Factual Series Gold Telly Award for General-Television |
| Jupiter: Close Encounter | 2017 | Producer | New York Festival's Best News Documentary/Special 2017 Gold World Medal Winner |
| Mayday | 2012–2015 | Producer, writer | |
| Canada 1812: Forged in Fire | 2010 | Producer | |
| Daily Planet | 1995–2008 | Producer | Nomination: 2008 Gemini Award for Best Lifestyle/Practical Segment |
