= Ron Lea =

Canadian actor

- Born: November 2, 1952 (age 73); Montreal, Quebec, Canada
- Years active: 1981–present

Ron Lea is a Canadian actor, who has had roles in Wind at My Back (1997–2000), Doc, Street Legal, This is Wonderland, Victor (2008), Flashpoint (2009), Good Witch (2015), and The Strain (2015).

== Early life ==
Lea was born in Montreal, and attended Concordia University. He studied acting at the National Theatre School of Canada.

== Career ==
Between 1990–1994, Lea played Brian Malony in Street Legal, for which he won the Gemini Award for Best Actor in a Leading Role in 1995. In 2008, he was nominated for a Gemini award again, for his role as Cliff Barry in the television movie Victor (2008). He starred in a single episode of Flashpoint (2009), for which he was nominated for a Gemini award for Best Actor in a Supporting Role.

== Filmography ==
=== Film ===
Year	Title	Role	Notes
1981	Happy Birthday to Me	Amelia's Date	
1984	The Surrogate	Salesman	
1985	The Blue Man	Mick	
1986	Cat City	Additional Voice	English version; voice
1987	Wild Thing	Dink	
1987	The Last Straw	Unknown	
1988	The Carpenter	Sheriff J.J. Johnston	
1988	Criminal Law	Gary Hull	
1988	Tommy Tricker and the Stamp Traveller	Brin James	
1989	Jesus of Montreal (Jésus de Montréal)	Daniel's Doctor / Daniel	English version; voice
1989	The Gunrunner	George	
1989	Blind Fear	Cal	
1990	Cursed	Vladimir Spratz	
1990	Princes in Exile	Dr. Kattenberg	
1990	A Touch of Murder	Bobby	
1991	Clearcut	Peter Maguire	
1992	Phantom Life (La vie fantôme)	Pierre	
1993	Double or Nothing: The Rise and Fall of Robert Campeau	Bruce Wasserstein	
1993	The Neighbor	John	
1994	Replikator	Byron Scott	
1994	Spike of Love	Harold	
1995	Iron Eagle on the Attack	Snyder	
1997	Tuff Luk Klub	Dominic Gallano	
1999	A Map of the World	Dan Collins	
2003	The Recruit	Bill Rudolph, Dell Rep.	
2003	Hurt	Darla's Dad	
2003	Pact with the Devil	Detective Giatti	
2004	A Home at the End of the World	Burt Morrow	
2004	A Different Loyalty	Jack Hewitt	
2006	The Sentinel	Detective #2	
2006	Bon Cop, Bad Cop	Brian MacDuff	
2007	Steel Toes	Interviewer	
2007	Saw IV	Rex	
2008	Punisher: War Zone	Captain Ross	
2009	Zombie Dearest	Reverend Harper	
2009	Christmas Cash	Frank Martin	Direct-to-video
2010	The Stranger	Chief Picker	Direct-to-video
2011	Afghan Luke	Mark	
2012	Cyberstalker	Detective Page	
2012	Imaginaerum	Dr. Jansson	
2013	The Resurrection of Tony Gitone	Frank	
2013	Bank$tas	Jesse Finkelstein	
2014	For Dorian	Oliver Baum	
2014	Brick Mansions	Lieutenant	
2014	Dr. Cabbie	Judge Charles Anders	
2016	An American Dream: The Education of William Bowman	Halberg Counsel 1	
2017	XX	Unknown	
2019	Georgetown	Detective Reid	
2022	Rosie	Jacques	
2026	Unholy Night	Giuseppe	

=== Television ===
Year	Title	Role	Notes
1984-1989	The Hitchhiker	Vic / Geoffrey Butler	2 episodes
1986	Spearfield's Daughter	Rossano	Miniseries
1987	Shades of Love: Make Mine Chartreuse	Teitlebaum	Television film
1988	Night Heat	Councilman	Episode: "Silk"
1988	Shades of Love: Moonlight Flight	Arnie Glassman	Television film
1988	Shades of Love: The Emerald Tear	Rusty	Television film
1989	Red Earth, White Earth	Fenske	Television film
1989	The Phone Call	Carey Parker	Television film
1990	War of the Worlds	Martin Daniels	Episode: "The Pied Piper"
1990	E.N.G.	Frank	Episode: "Otherwise Inflicted"
1990–1994	Street Legal	Brian Malony	51 episodes
1991	Heritage Minutes	Vince Coleman	Episode: "Halifax Explosion"
1991	Counterstrike	Mallick	Episode: "Tie a Yellow Ribbon"
1991	The Return of Eliot Ness	Pete Sheppard	Television film
1992	The Great Diamond Robbery	Matrisciana	Television film
1992	Secret Service	Delaney	Episode: "The Stalker/Bomb Protective Mission"
1992	Bombardier	Major McBain	2 episodes
1993	Bonds of Love	Reporter	Television film
1994	RoboCop	Trenton	Episode: "The Tin Man"
1994	Due South	Mr. Nichols	2 episodes
1994–1995	Catwalk	Gus Danzig	13 episodes
1995	TekWar	John Grant	Episode: "Tek Posse"
1995	Side Effects	Dr. Jack Mason	Episode: "Heart Choices"
1995	Sirens	Dominic Duzaky	Episode: "Angel Falling"
1995	Vanished	Tom Armour	Television film
1995	The Possession of Michael D.	Police Chief	Television film
1995	Degree of Guilt	Mackinlay Brooks	Television film
1995	Ebbie	Paul	Television film
1995	Long Island Fever	Will Dannon	Television film
1996	Omerta, la loi du silence	Gino Favara	5 episodes
1996	F/X: The Series	Nicky Vincent	Episode: "Dingo"
1996	Shadow Zone: The Undead Express	Dad	Television film
1997	Black Harbour	Jeff Schmitt	Episode: "The Water is Wide"
1997	Lies He Told	Sergeant Bill Bell	Television film
1997	Nothing Sacred	Land Developer	Episode: "Proofs for the Existence of God"
1997	Goosebumps	Colin Blackwell	2 episodes
1997	Omertà II - La loi du silence	Gino Favara	12 episodes
1997–2000	Wind at My Back	Del Sutton	18 episodes
1998	Once a Thief	Carmine	Episode: "The Last Temptation of Vic"
1998	Psi Factor	Chief Phil Pratt	Episode: "Heartland"
1998	Mythic Warriors	Chiron	Episode: "Jason and the Argonauts"
1998	Once a Thief: Family Business	Carmine	Television film
1999	Escape from Mars	Jason, Mission Control Weasel	Television film
1999	Cry Rape	Mr. Sherman, Alex's Attorney	Television film
1999	The Practice	Larry Conley	Episode: "Home Invasions"
1999	Sea People	James	Television film
1999	Diagnosis: Murder	Ira Janos	Episode: "The Seven Deadly Sins"
1999	Omertà - Le dernier des hommes d'honneur	Gino Favara	Television film
2000	Live Through This	Drake Taylor	1 episode
2001	Largo Winch: The Heir	Joop Van Dreema	Television film
2001–2004	Doc	Dr. Oliver Crane	88 episodes
2002	The Eleventh Hour	Miles Rebick	Episode: "The 37-Year-Itch"
2002	All Around the Town	Brendan Moody	Television film
2002-2005	Sue Thomas: F.B.Eye	Joe Wolf / Dr. Phillip Crane / Guy On Tv	2 episodes
2003	Les aventures tumultueuses de Jack Carter	Luca Galvani	2 episodes
2003	Mutant X	Dr. Vincent Arrigo	Episode: "The Breed"
2003	The Last Chapter II: The War Continues	Norm Attwood	6 episodes
2003-2004	Blue Murder	Cam McBride / Jacob Hamilton	2 episodes
2004	Il Duce Canadese	Mazzotta	2 episodes
2005	Mayday	Harold Stein	Television film
2005–2006	This Is Wonderland	Jack Angel	13 episodes
2006	Angela's Eyes	Eddie Young	Episode: "Blue-eyed Blues"
2006	The Path to 9/11	CIA Agent Jim Fielding	2 episodes
2006	Absolution	Father Paul Montoya	Television film
2006	Why I Wore Lipstick to My Mastectomy	Dr. Keel	Television film
2006	The State Within	Carl Garcia	4 episodes
2006	Secret Files of the Inquisition	Pope Paul IV / Pedro de Arbués	3 episodes
2007	'Til Death Do Us Part	Jim Stevens	Episode: "A Christmas Murder"
2007	The Best Years	Professor Fisher	7 episodes
2007	Race to Mars	Max "Bull" Haber	2 episodes
2007	Reaper	Campaign Manager	Episode: "What About the Blob"
2008	Victor	Cliff Barry	Television film
2008	Paparazzi Princess: The Paris Hilton Story	Paris' Lawyer	Television film
2008	The Quality of Life	Tom Drood	Television film
2008	Supernatural	Travis	Episode: "Metamorphosis"
2008	Anne of Green Gables: A New Beginning	Gene Armstrong	Television film
2009	Flashpoint	Sergeant Daniel Rangford	Episode: "Haunting the Barn"
2009	Impact!	Tom Ranfield	2 episodes
2009	The Phantom	Sergeant Sean Davidson	2 episodes
2010	Shattered	Karl Alvert	Episode: "Where's the Line?"
2010	Tower Prep	Public School Teacher	Episode: "New Kid"
2010	Smallville	Joseph Cavanaugh	Episode: "Harvest"
2011	And Baby Will Fall	Blanchard	Television film
2011	Goodnight for Justice	Dan Reed	Episode: "Goodnight for Justice"
2011	Endgame	Robert Spiro	Episode: "The White Queen"
2012	Burden of Evil	Lieutenant Frank McDermott	Television film
2012	Republic of Doyle	Chili Power	Episode: "High School Confidential"
2012	King	Sergeant Lou Adelman	Episode: "Josh Simpson"
2012	Saving Hope	Dr. Ron McBride	Episode: "A New Beginning"
2013	Alien Mysteries	Detective Stephen White	Episode: "The Reed Family"
2013	Lost Girl	The Caretaker	Episode: "The Ceremony"
2013	Being Human	Pete	2 episodes
2013	Bomb Girls	Detective Brodie	2 episodes
2013	Copper	Judge	2 episodes
2013	Christmas with Tucker	Thorne	Television film
2013–2015	Hard Rock Medical	Ray Teneli	5 episodes
2013–2017	Orphan Black	Lieutenant Gavin Hardcastle	11 episodes
2014	The Best Laid Plans	Norm Fontana	6 episodes
2014	Sorority Surrogate	Oscar Oberly	Television film
2014	How to Build a Better Boy	General McFee	Television film
2014	Touring T.O.	Richard	3 episodes
2014	Reign	The Count	Episode: "Terror of the Faithful"
2014	Covert Affairs	Commander Richard Wheeler	Episode: "Transport Is Arranged"
2014	Christmas at Cartwright's	Mr. Cartwright	Television film
2015	A Wish Come True	Charlie	Television film
2015	Good Witch	Jerry	4 episodes
2015	The Strain	Harrison McGeever	4 episodes
2015	Christmas Incorporated	Mayor Martin Keegan	Television film
2016	Flower Shop Mysteries	Tom Harding	Episode: "Flower Shop Mystery: Mum's the Word"
2016	Valentine Ever After	Walter Caldwell	Television film
2016	Rogue	Jared Bosco	2 episodes
2016	For Love & Honor	Henry Cabot	Television film
2016	Love on a Limb	Sheriff Larry Garibaldi	Television film
2016	Shoot the Messenger	Inspector Morris	6 episodes
2016-2018	Killjoys	Marris	2 episodes
2017	Framed for Murder: A Fixer Upper Mystery	Pete Hughes	Television film
2017	Concrete Evidence: A Fixer Upper Mystery	Pete Hughes	Television film
2017	Béliveau	Frank Selke	3 episodes
2017	American Gods	Cambro	Episode: "Lemon Scented You"
2017	Private Eyes	Sidney Woods	Episode: "The P.I. Code"
2018	The Detectives	Flavio Del Sordo	Episode: "Father's Day"
2018	Her Stolen Past	Joseph Coyle	Television film
2018	Deadly Deed: A Fixer Upper Mystery	Pete Hughes	Television film
2018	Northern Lights of Christmas	Doyle Hathaway	Television film
2019	Secrets in a Small Town	Sheriff Doug Mosley	Television film
2019	Boombats	Lorenzo	3 episodes
2019	Suits	Paul Richmond	Episode: "Prisoner's Dilemma"
2019	Christmas Jars	Adam Maxwell	Television film
2019	Nostalgic Christmas	Bill Garrison	Television film
2020	Fortunate Son	CIA Director	2 episodes
2020	Workin' Moms	Roger Foster	2 episodes
2020	Cardinal	Detective McKinley	Episode: "Scott"
2020	Unlocking Christmas	Arnold Matthews	Television film
2020	Cooking Up Love	Grampa Morgan	Television film
2021	The Christmas Market	Art Foster	Television film
2022	In the Dark	Chief Peters	2 episodes
TBA	Bishop †	Lt. Jack Quinn	TBD episodes

Key
†	Denotes television productions that have not yet been released
