= Interstate 60 =

2002 film by Bob Gale

- Official DVD cover
- Directed by: Bob Gale
- Written by: Bob Gale
- Produced by: Bob Gale; Ira Deutchman; Peter Newman
- Starring: James Marsden; Gary Oldman; Amy Smart; Christopher Lloyd; Amy Jo Johnson; Ann-Margret; Art Evans; Chris Cooper; Kurt Russell; Michael J. Fox
- Cinematography: Denis Maloney
- Edited by: Michael Fallavollita
- Music by: Christophe Beck
- Production companies: Fireworks Pictures; Seven Arts Pictures
- Distributed by: Samuel Goldwyn Films
- Release dates: October 4, 2002 (Los Angeles); October 14, 2002 (United States)
- Running time: 112 minutes
- Countries: Canada; United States
- Language: English
- Budget: $7 million
- Box office: $8,449

Interstate 60 (also known as Interstate 60: Episodes of the Road) is a 2002 American independent road film written and directed by Bob Gale in his directorial debut. The film stars James Marsden, Gary Oldman, Amy Smart, Christopher Lloyd, Chris Cooper, Amy Jo Johnson, Art Evans, Ann-Margret and Kurt Russell, with a cameo by Michael J. Fox. In the film, an aspiring artist takes a trip to the fictional town of Danver, Colorado searching for an answer to his life and a dream girl.

== Plot ==
In a bar, a college student affirms that the United States does not have any folktales involving characters who grant wishes. An elderly man then interrupts him, insisting that he is wrong. He mentions O.W. Grant, who carries a pipe in the shape of a monkey's head. Grant travels the country granting wishes to strangers, usually messing with them in the process. However, if he likes you, he will play it straight.

Meanwhile, St. Louis-based grocery warehouse worker Neal Oliver aspires to be an artist, despite the lack of support from his father and girlfriend. At a party for his 22nd birthday, O.W. Grant is the waiter who serves the cake. While blowing out the candles, Neal wishes for an answer to his life. His father responds by handing him an admission letter to law school that Neal does not want to attend. The family goes outside to look at the red BMW convertible that Neal's dad bought him as a gift, but Neal notices that the car was clearly meant for his dad and not him. Neal is later struck on the head by a falling bucket.

Neal wakes up in the hospital, where a doctor named Ray comes in and does a sight test using playing cards. Neal has to name the suit on the cards. Neal asks if he got it right, and Ray points out that the cards actually had red spades and black hearts, emphasizing that things are not always what they seem.

After leaving the hospital, Neal sees a woman that he has been dreaming about in a billboard advertisement, but the billboard company insists that the billboard is blank. After checking the billboard, Neal sees a new picture of her, this time with a framed inscription "Call 555-1300". Neal calls the number, and a recorded message says that he has an appointment at 555 Olive Street, Suite 1300 in the downtown area.

At the appointment, Ray gives him a package to deliver to a Robin Fields in Danver, Colorado (not "Denver"). Neal will find Danver by taking Interstate 60.

With no Interstate 60 on the roadmap, Neal sets out south to where it should be, (between I-40 and I-70) and encounters O.W. Grant on the roadside. Grant gives Neal directions to Interstate 60. On his journey, Neal meets a man who can consume unnatural quantities of food and drink; a woman looking for perfect sex; a mother looking for her son, who lives in a city where the population is addicted to a government-controlled drug; a dying ex-advertiser on a crusade to punish dishonesty; and Mrs. James, who runs the Museum of Art Fraud that actually contains real masterpieces posing as fakes.

At the town of Morlaw, where all citizens are lawyers who spend their days suing each other, Neal finds Lynn, the imprisoned woman he has been dreaming about and painting. Lynn met O.W. Grant and wished to find the right guy. They have sex at a motel. Neal also makes a painting of the motel. Neal leaves to deliver the package in Danver, while Lynn stays behind.

On the radio, Neal hears of a reported murderer on the loose, and the description matches his car. He abandons his vehicle to hitchhike. In Danver, Neal meets "Robin Fields", who turns out to be O.W. Grant. After opening the package (which holds a replacement monkey-head pipe for O.W.'s broken one), Grant uses his powers to "warp" Neal back in time, where he wakes up in the hospital before he first encountered Ray.

Leaving the hospital, Neal confronts his father and asserts his right to live his life without the latter's interference. His sister takes him to an art gallery where Neal sees his painting of the motel – submitted on his behalf by O.W. Grant after Neal had "left it" there. He is approached by Lynn, who in reality works with Danver Publishing, because she took an interest in his painting. She talks about wanting to commission him to do more paintings on roadside motels and diners.

== Cast ==
- James Marsden as Neal Oliver
- Gary Oldman as O.W. Grant
- Amy Smart as Lynn Linden
- Christopher Lloyd as Ray
- Chris Cooper as Bob Cody
- Kurt Russell as Captain Ives
- Michael J. Fox as Mr. Baker
- Ann-Margret as Mrs. James
- Amy Jo Johnson as Laura
- Art Evans as Otis
- John Bourgeois as Daniel Oliver, Neal's Father
- Roz Michaels as Marlene Oliver, Neal's Mother
- Amy Stewart as Nancy Oliver, Neal's Sister
- Wayne Robson as "Deep Stomach"
- Rebecca Jenkins as Susan Ross
- Tyler Kyte as Philip Ross
- Deborah Odell as Valerie McCabe
- Melyssa Ade as Sally

== Release ==
=== Home media ===
==== Deleted scenes ====
The DVD includes several deleted scenes and the "bridges" where they would be placed in the film. They include:

- Neal visits an AAA office where he seeks information about Interstate 60 that the service representative repeatedly tells him does not exist. The man explains the American Interstate Highway System to Neal. Neal discovers that if I-60 did exist, it would be oriented west to east and be north of Interstate 40 and south of Interstate 70.
- When told by the man in the bar about O. W. Grant at the film's beginning, a waitress tells Neal that she had never seen the man before but he had won a large amount of bets by consuming large quantities of alcohol in a brief time without throwing up or urinating. This is the same man who appears later in a diner and makes similar bets that he can eat large amounts of food without releasing them through similar processes. The man admitted he acquired this quality through a wish from O.W. Grant but did not enjoy it, because in addition to being able to eat without stopping, he now must do so to avoid starving.
- Neal meets his father in his office saying that he doesn't want to be in a pigeon hole. His father says that everyone in the world is in a pigeon hole, even starving artists; there are good pigeon holes and bad pigeon holes so it is better to be in a good one.
- At the beginning of his road journey, Neal receives a call on his car phone but shuts it off narrating that the only freedom left in the 21st Century is to be incommunicado.
- After leaving the hospital at the end of the film, Neal breaks up with his girlfriend who calls him a loser and that artists starving for their work only exist in the previous century.

== Reception ==
=== Box office ===
Following a limited release in US, R-rated Interstate 60 grossed $8,449 at the domestic box office against a $7 million budget.

=== Critical response ===
Robert Koehler, writing in Variety, criticized the film's "juvenile obviousness" and says that the themes do not feel genuine.

Review aggregation website Rotten Tomatoes lists 4 reviews, and reports 3 positive and 1 negative review.

=== Accolades ===
Year	Award	Category	Recipients	Result
2003	DVD Exclusive Awards	Best Live Action DVD Premiere Movie	Peter Bray, Neil Canton, Bob Gale	Won
2003	DVD Exclusive Awards	Best Screenplay for a DVD Premiere Movie	Bob Gale	Won
2003	DVD Exclusive Awards	Best Director of a DVD Premiere Movie	Bob Gale	Nominated
2003	DVD Exclusive Awards	Best Supporting Actor in a DVD Premiere Movie	Chris Cooper	Nominated
2003	DVD Exclusive Awards	Best Supporting Actor in a DVD Premiere Movie	Gary Oldman	Nominated
2003	DVD Exclusive Awards	Best Supporting Actor in a DVD Premiere Movie	Amy Smart	Nominated
2004	Saturn Awards	Best DVD Release	Interstate 60	Nominated
