= A Place Between: The Story of an Adoption =

A Place Between – The Story of an Adoption
- Directed by: Curtis Kaltenbaugh
- Produced by: Joe MacDonald
- Narrated by: Curtis Kaltenbaugh
- Edited by: Kenneth George Godwin
- Music by: Greg Lowe
- Production company: National Film Board of Canada
- Release date: 2007
- Running time: 74 minutes
- Country: Canada

A Place Between – The Story of an Adoption is a 2007 Canadian documentary film dealing with cross-cultural adoption and aboriginal life in Canada. It was directed by Curtis Kaltenbaugh and produced by the National Film Board of Canada.

Curtis and Ashok Kaltenbaugh were born in Manitoba and are of First Nations ancestry. After the 1980 death of their younger brother, at the ages of 7 and 4 respectively, they were removed from the custody of their birth mother and placed for adoption with a middle-class white family living in Pennsylvania. The film chronicles their search for identity and the meeting of their adoptive and birth families.

The film won the Best Public Service award at the 2007 American Indian Film Festival. It was a nominee for the Donald Brittain Award for best social or political documentary at the 23rd Gemini Awards in 2008.
