= The Elizabeth Smart Story =

2003 made for TV crime drama film, based on a true story

- Written by: Nancey Silvers
- Directed by: Bobby Roth
- Starring: Dylan Baker; Lindsay Frost; Amber Marshall; Hannah Lochner; Tyler Kyte; Tom Everett; Hollis McLaren
- Theme music composer: Christopher Franke
- Country of origin: United States
- Original language: English

Production
- Producers: Peter Sadowski; Randy Sutter
- Running time: 120 minutes

Original release
- Network: CBS
- Release: November 9, 2003

The Elizabeth Smart Story is a 2003 American made-for-television crime drama film about the high-profile Elizabeth Smart kidnapping case. It was broadcast less than eight months after her recovery. It was based on the book Bringing Elizabeth Home written by her parents, Ed and Lois Smart.

== Plot ==
Fourteen-year-old Elizabeth Smart is part of a large and loving Mormon family. Her father Ed hires a handyman, a self-styled prophet named Immanuel, to help him with a remodeling job.

Months later, Immanuel returns and kidnaps Elizabeth at knifepoint. Her sister, Mary Katherine, who is in the bed with her, is too terrified to immediately tell her parents.

Once she does, a massive police investigation begins. The Smarts are angered when the investigation questions whether any family members are involved in Elizabeth’s disappearance. A massive search effort begins and the story causes a media frenzy. After a false news story that the police suspect a family member, Ed takes and passes a polygraph test.

Richard Ricci, who had been employed by the Smarts until his dismissal following a theft of jewelry, is apprehended for a parole violation. Authorities are investigating his potential connection to Elizabeth's disappearance.

Immanuel subsequently tries to kidnap one of Elizabeth's cousins, but is unsuccessful.

The Smarts learn Ricci has had an aneurysm and is now brain dead.

After this, Elizabeth's mother gives up hope, the story fades into the background and the police stop looking for Elizabeth.

At one point, Mary Katherine realizes that it was Immanuel who took Elizabeth, but the police do not pursue this lead. Ed appears on the TV show America's Most Wanted and tells host John Walsh in confidence about this new information.

When Walsh reveals it on Larry King Live, the Smarts publish a sketch of Immanuel, who is later identified as Brian David Mitchell.

After having taken her to San Diego, Mitchell returns to Salt Lake City with his wife Wanda Ilene Barzee and Elizabeth. When the police accidentally come across the three of them and question them, Elizabeth identifies herself, resulting in Mitchell's arrest and Elizabeth's reunion with her family.

A postscript revealed that Elizabeth went back to high school and resumed her life. Both Brian and Wanda Barzee were sentenced to aggravated kidnapping, sexual assault and burglary, underwent mental competency evaluations with no court date set.

== Cast ==
- Dylan Baker as Ed Smart
- Lindsay Frost as Lois Smart
- Amber Marshall as Elizabeth Smart
- Hannah Lochner as Mary Katherine Smart
- Tyler Kyte as Charles Smart
- Tom Everett as Brian David Mitchell (aka "Immanuel")
- Hollis McLaren as Wanda Ilene Barzee
- Kenneth McGregor as Richard Ricci
- Robert Wisdin as Jim Smart
- Jacob Kraemer as Andrew Smart
- Bruce Gooch as John Walsh

== Awards ==
Three of the film's stars were nominated for 2004 Young Artist Awards. Amber Marshall was nominated for the Best Performance in a TV Movie, Miniseries or Special - Leading Young Actress. Hannah Lochner was nominated for the Best Performance in a TV Movie, Miniseries or Special - Supporting Young Actress. Jacob Kraemer was nominated for the Best Performance in a TV Movie, Miniseries or Special - Supporting Young Actor.
