= Mom at Sixteen =

- Written by: Nancey Silvers
- Directed by: Peter Werner
- Starring: Danielle Panabaker; Jane Krakowski; Clare Stone; Tyler Hynes; Colin Ferguson; Mercedes Ruehl
- Music by: Richard Marvin
- Countries of origin: United States; Canada
- Original language: English

Production
- Executive producer: Bernard Sofronski
- Cinematography: Neil Roach
- Editor: Tod Feuerman
- Running time: 86 minutes

Original release
- Network: Lifetime
- Release: March 2005

Mom at Sixteen is a 2005 Lifetime Television film about a sixteen-year-old mother, dealing with problems at school and her decaying relationship with her mother, because of her seeing her boyfriend for the first time since before her son was born.

== Plot ==
Sixteen-year-old Jacey Jeffrie has recently given birth to her son Charley. Instead of giving him up for adoption as planned, she chose to keep him. Her mother, Terry pretends Charley is hers, allowing Jacey to lead a relatively normal life as she prepares to graduate. Jacey still holds feelings for Charley's father, college student Brad, and feels guilty that Brad is unaware Charley exists. Her attempts to contact Brad fail due to her own anxiety.

At her new school, Jacey criticizes several students' promiscuity during a class discussion. Her opinions lead health teacher Donna Cooper to take a special interest in her. Donna's husband, swim coach Bob, convinces Jacey to join the swim team. Jacey passes out after taking tranquilizers stolen from her mother and ends up in the hospital. Donna and Bob, unable to conceive, are devastated to discover their latest round of in-vitro fertilization has failed.

After seeing Jacey with Charley, Donna asks Jacey if Charley is her son. Although she lies, other students witness the interaction and begin to believe Jacey is Charley's mother, subsequently bullying and ostracizing her. When the truth is eventually exposed, the other students begin to criticize her hypocrisy. She soon begins attending a support group for teen mothers.

After another bullying incident, Jacey leaves to visit Brad. After spending the day together, Jacey finally tells Brad about Charley. Brad reacts poorly to the news and leaves. Upon returning home, Jacey gets into an argument with Terry, who tells her to take responsibility for her actions and appreciate the sacrifices Terry has made to help her. Jacey turns to Donna for advice, who convinces her to tell Terry she wants to be a proper mother figure to Charley.

Weeks later, Brad arrives at Jacey's house to apologize and repair his relationship with her. However, when Jacey learns Brad's parents will only help if a DNA test is done to prove Brad is the father, she feels betrayed and leaves him.

At school, Jacey gives a speech on sex education and teenage pregnancy, using examples from her friends from the support group. Her former bullies applaud her, having a newfound respect for her honesty and sensibility. Jacey's sister Macy gives her a DVD she had put together for Charley to watch when he is older. After Jacey and Terry watch it together, the two reconcile. Later, Donna receives a call that she and Bob have been approved to adopt a baby. They later discover that it is Charley, having been given up by Terry and Jacey to give him the best life possible.

Five years later, Bob and Donna have a new baby daughter, and Charley is beginning his first day of kindergarten, with Jacey, Donna, and Bob all present. Bob records Charley, who tells the camera that while Donna and Jacey are both his moms, Jacey is his "special" mom because he is the "only one who knows how her heart feels from inside her." It is implied that Donna and Bob were the couple who was originally going to adopt Charley before Jacey changed her mind.

== Cast ==
- Danielle Panabaker as Jacey Jeffries, Charley's birth mother
  - Lacey Wolfe as 4-year-old Jacey
  - Janessa Hunt as 10-year-old Jacey
- Jane Krakowski as Donna Cooper, Charley's adoptive mother
- Clare Stone as Macy Jeffries, Jacey's younger sister
  - Kay Panabaker as Young Macy (uncredited)
- Tyler Hynes as Brad, Jacey's boyfriend
- Colin Ferguson as Bob Cooper, Charley's adoptive father
- Mercedes Ruehl as Terry Jeffries, Jacey's mother
- Hollis McLaren as Marlene
- Rejean Cournoyer as Mr. Cheevers
- Dawn McKelvie Cyr as Gretchen
- Megan Edwards as Linda
- Matthew MacCaull as Dr. Hughes
- Sabrina Jalees as Sarah
- Deborah Allen as Pauline
- Anastasia Hill as Trea
- Leah Fassett as Gena
- Scott Smith as Charley Cooper
  - Luke MacInnis as 5-year-old Charley
