= Would Be Kings =

Canadian television series

Would Be Kings is a Canadian television mini-series directed by David Wellington, which aired on CTV on January 27 and January 28, 2008.

== Plot ==
Based loosely on Shakespeare's play King Henry IV (part 1), Patrick Lehane (Currie Graham) and Jamie Collins (Ben Bass) are cops. They are also cousins and Patrick is Jamie's boss. Patrick is the "by-the-books" cop while Jamie is the always-breaking-the-rules type of cop who is also dealing with a drug addiction. As their relationship comes to a crossroads, Jamie is forced to clean up his act and Patrick gets involved in questionable police work which leads to dirty money and murder. He also has a wife (Natasha Henstridge) and daughter (Clare Stone) to protect.

== Production ==
The miniseries was filmed in Hamilton, Ontario, in 2006.

== Awards ==
Award	Date of Ceremony	Category	Nominees	Result	Reference
Gemini Awards	November 28, 2008	Best Dramatic Miniseries	Ilana Frank, Tassie Cameron, Daphne Park, Ray Sager, Peter R. Simpson, Esta Spalding, David Wellington	Nominated	
Gemini Awards	November 28, 2008	Best Actor in a Dramatic Program or Miniseries	Ben Bass	Nominated	
Gemini Awards	November 28, 2008	Best Actress in a Dramatic Program or Miniseries	Natasha Henstridge	Won	
Gemini Awards	November 28, 2008	Best Supporting Actress in a Dramatic Program or Miniseries	Clare Stone	Nominated	
Gemini Awards	November 28, 2008	Best Direction in a Dramatic Program or Mini-Series	David Wellington	Nominated	
Gemini Awards	November 28, 2008	Best Writing in a Dramatic Program or Mini-Series	Tassie Cameron, Esta Spalding	Nominated	
Gemini Awards	November 28, 2008	Best Makeup	Marilyn O'Quinn	Nominated	
Gemini Awards	November 28, 2008	Best Sound in a Dramatic Program	Peter Clements, Sue Conley, John Dykstra, Martin Lee, Virginia Storey, Robert Warchol	Nominated	
Directors Guild of Canada	2008	Best Picture Editing in a Television Movie/Mini-Series	Teresa Hannigan	Won	
Directors Guild of Canada	2008	Best Production Design in a Television Movie/Mini-Series	James McAteer	Nominated	
WGC Screenwriting Awards	2008	Best Writing in a MOW or Mini-series	Tassie Cameron, Esta Spalding	Nominated	
