= Rick Mofina =

Canadian author

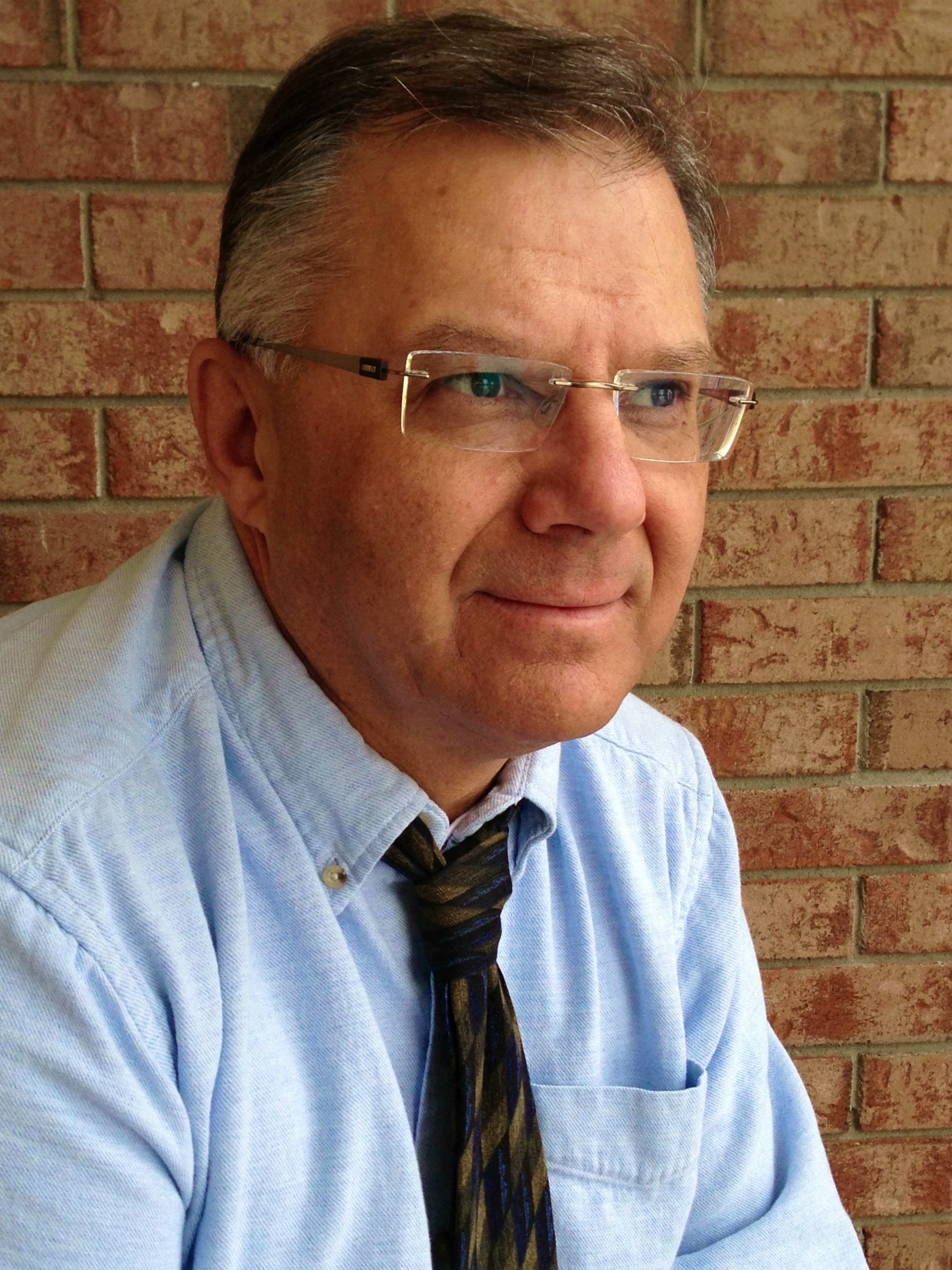
Mofina in 2013

Rick Mofina is a Canadian author. His publications have included more than thirty crime fiction and thriller novels.

Mofina is a member of the Mystery Writers of America, the International Thriller Writers, the Crime Writers' Association, and the Crime Writers of Canada.

== Early life and education ==
Mofina grew up in Belleville, Ontario and began writing short stories in grade school. He sold his first short story at the age of fifteen. He sold subsequent short stories while in high school to various magazines. After finishing high school he worked for a few years in factories. Mofina wrote his first novel, still unpublished, around the age of 18 following a hitchhiking trip across parts of Canada and the United States.

Mofina attended Carleton University and studied Journalism, English Literature, American Detective Fiction, and Religious Responses to Death. During his time at university, "Somewhere between reading Dostoevsky and T.S. Eliot, I picked up a suspense novel by Mary Higgins Clark. Read it twice to study how she pulled it off. It was like an intricate little puzzle and the notion of attempting a suspense story intrigued me,” Mofina wrote in an essay titled: “The long journey to my first novel” published by The Ottawa Citizen; Ottawa, Ontario in February 2000.

He was initially a student reporter at The Toronto Star, before pursuing a career in journalism at The Ottawa Citizen, The Calgary Herald, Southam News, and CanWest.

His freelance crime stories have appeared around the world in such publications as The New York Times, Reader’s Digest, Marie Claire, Penthouse, The South China Morning Post magazine and The Moscow Times.

His reporting has put him face-to-face with murderers on death row in Montana and Texas. He covered a horrific serial killing case in California, an armored car heist in Las Vegas, the murders of police officers in Alberta, flew over Los Angeles with the LAPD, and went on patrol with the Royal Canadian Mounted Police near the Arctic. In researching one story, Mofina was walked step-by-step through the execution protocol as if he was the condemned prisoner. He has reported from the Caribbean, Africa, and the Middle East.

== Novels ==
His first published novel, If Angels Fall was published in 2000 and introduced San Francisco Star crime reporter Tom Reed and San Francisco Homicide Inspector Walt Sydowski. Inspired by real incidents, the story concerned a series of kidnappings. It was the Best First Novel finalist for an Arthur Ellis Award from the Crime Writers of Canada.

His second Reed-Sydowski book Cold Fear, is focused on a San Francisco girl who goes missing during a family camping trip in the Rockies with investigators suspecting her parents. With Cold Fear, Quill & Quire said, “[Mofina] Positions himself high in the suspense genre saddle.”

It was followed by Blood Of Others, which author James Patterson praised as, “Tense, realistic, and scary in all the right places.” The Ottawa Citizen described Rick as “A writer clearly destined for literary stardom,” while Penthouse said he was, “One of the leading thriller writers of the day.” The book dealt with the disappearance and murder of a lonely San Francisco insurance clerk in a case that puts Reed and Sydowski on separate tracks in their pursuit of a killer.

No Way Back, the fourth Reed-Sydowski book, was released in 2003 and praised by Michael Connelly as being, “My kind of novel — a tough, taut thriller.” In this story, Reed’s wife is taken hostage after a jewelry store heist goes awry with the murder of a SFPD officer.

The book was followed in 2004 by Be Mine, the fifth and final story in the series. A message in blood near a homicide cop’s dead body has Reed and Sydowski on the case of a killer obsessed with Reed’s fellow reporter Molly Wilson. Dean Koontz said Mofina was writing, “A fine series of thrillers to which Be Mine is a great addition: swiftly paced, entertaining, with authentic details of police procedure.”

After five books — and two movie options on If Angels Fall and Cold Fear, which have since expired — the Reed-Sydowski series went on hiatus and Mofina launched a new series featuring Jason Wade, a rookie crime reporter based in Seattle. For that book he drew upon his own experiences as a rookie student reporter at The Toronto Star and later, The Calgary Herald. The series debuted in the summer of 2005 with The Dying Hour, which climbed to #7 on Canada’s best seller list (Quill & Quire) and hit #1 among Walmart Canada’s best sellers.

The second book in the Jason Wade series, Every Fear, features a story that “Pushes crackling suspense to the breaking point and beyond,” according to New York Times bestselling author Kay Hooper. Rick’s third Jason Wade book is A Perfect Grave.

Mofina followed A Perfect Grave with his first standalone book, the global thriller Six Seconds, which contains a plot to assassinate the Pope. For that book, Mofina drew heavily on his sources who had actually headed a Papal Security Detail, and on his international assignments as a newspaper reporter and his time as a wire service reporter. Six Seconds became a bestseller in the US, the UK and Canada, and has drawn praise from around the world. It was published in 12 countries and several languages, including German, Danish, Finnish, Turkish, Spanish, and Polish.

After Six Seconds, Mofina launched a new series featuring crime reporter Jack Gannon, who is introduced in Vengeance Road.Vengeance Road was followed by The Panic Zone, another global thriller where Gannon pursues a plot to wreak havoc on the world with an engineered contagion.

The story was followed by In Desperation where Gannon is contacted by his long-lost sister after her daughter's abduction. The book was nominated for Best Suspense/Thriller by RT Reviewers' Choice.

In the fourth and last book in the series, The Burning Edge, Gannon is on the story of a single mom, hunted by killers after witnessing a deadly armored car heist.

Mofina's next work was a standalone thriller, They Disappeared. It was inspired by a true incident where Mofina got separated from his family at a crowded venue and couldn't find them for some time. Library Journal said: "Rick Mofina is one of the best thriller writers in the business."

They Disappeared was followed by another standalone thriller, Into the Dark, in which a psychologist’s patient goes missing; while a grieving L.A. detective gets close to a killer.

Mofina then wrote The Only Human, a standalone fantasy novel for young readers. It’s the story of a 13-year-old-boy, who, as the descendant of a stonecutter who created Manhattan’s gargoyles, learns he is the only person who can remove an apocalyptic curse on the city and the world.

Mofina then launched another series introducing single mom and reporter, Kate Page, in Whirlwind, where she chases the story of a baby abducted during a tornado in Texas. Whirlwind was followed by three other books in the Kate Page series, Full Tilt, Every Second, and Free Fall.

In 2017, Mofina released Before Sunrise, a dark novella about a broken cop struggling with lifelong guilt after taking innocent lives in the line of duty.

Mofina then wrote several more standalone thrillers starting with Last Seen, the story of a Chicago crime reporter whose son disappears in a carnival house of horrors. In her praise of Last Seen, author Louise Penny said, “Rick Mofina’s books are edge-of-your seat thrilling. Page turners that don’t let up.”

Next came Missing Daughter, which charted on the USA Today bestseller list. The story concerns the case of a 12-year-old girl who disappeared one night from her home without leaving a trace, until a stunning twist plunges her family deeper into a world of buried secrets. Missing Daughter received the Barry Award from Deadly Pleasures Magazine for Best Paperback Original.

Missing Daughter was followed by The Lying House, a story about a young couple that moves to Miami for a dream job when a terrifying home invasion unravels everything they thought they knew about their perfect home and marriage.

Mofina then released Their Last Secret, the story of how three teens linked to a multiple murder are haunted throughout their lives by their crime.

Next came Search For Her, a novel about how a troubled family's cross-country move turns into a nightmare when their 14-year-old daughter vanishes from their RV at a large truck stop near Las Vegas. In researching the book, Mofina followed the fictional family’s path and interviewed police in San Diego, as well as police and the FBI in Las Vegas.

Mofina’s next release was Her Last Goodbye, slightly inspired by real events. In this story, a contractor in Buffalo, New York, wakes to find his wife has not returned home from her suburban-neighborhood book club meeting.

Mofina’s next book, Everything She Feared was inspired by several true-life murders, and in part, is an homage to The Bad Seed, the 1954 book by William March, whose work Mofina admires. Everything She Feared begins with a teen taking selfies on a wilderness outing near Seattle. When she falls at the edge of a cliff, the last thing she sees before plummeting to her death is Katie Harmon, the nine-year-old girl she was babysitting, looking down at her. Everything She Feared landed at the #1 spot for bestselling books in Canada and is a finalist for the 2024 Barry Award for Best Paperback Original.

For his next book Mofina again drew on real events. Talking to journalist colleagues working at major news outlets in New York City, and meeting in person with police at the New York Police Department's Central Park Precinct, Mofina created his thriller, Someone Saw Something. When a six-year-old boy vanishes in Central Park, his mother, a network news anchor and seasoned journalist, searches for answers with time running out.

His work has received acknowledgment from authors including James Patterson, Dean Koontz, Michael Connelly, Lee Child, Tess Gerritsen, Jeffery Deaver, Sandra Brown, James Rollins and Kay Hooper.

He has appeared regularly on the TV documentary series True Pulp Murder as a guest novelist.

== Works ==
=== Series ===
Title	Series	Publication year	Awards / Nominations
If Angels Fall	Tom Reed & Walt Sydowski	2000	Finalist for an Arthur Ellis Award
Cold Fear	Tom Reed & Walt Sydowski	2001	Finalist for an Arthur Ellis Award
Blood of Others	Tom Reed & Walt Sydowski	2002	Winner of the Arthur Ellis Award
No Way Back	Tom Reed & Walt Sydowski	2003	
Be Mine	Tom Reed & Walt Sydowski	2004	
The Dying Hour	Jason Wade	2005	Finalist International Thriller Award
Every Fear	Jason Wade	2006	Best Reads, Spinetingler Magazine
A Perfect Grave	Jason Wade	2007	Spinetingler Rising Star Award Finalist
Vengeance Road	Jack Gannon	2009	Finalist Shamus Award, International Thriller Award
The Panic Zone	Jack Gannon	2010	Finalist Shamus Award
In Desperation	Jack Gannon	2011	RTBook Reviews - Reviewers' Choice Best Book Award
The Burning Edge	Jack Gannon	2011	
Whirlwind	Kate Page	2014	Finalist International Thriller Award
Full Tilt	Kate Page	2015	
Every Second	Kate Page	2015	
Free Fall	Kate Page	2016	
Into the Fire	Ray Wyatt	2022	
The Hollow Place	Ray Wyatt	2022	Best E-Book Original Novel Finalist International Thriller Writers
Requiem	Ray Wyatt	2022	

=== Standalone novels ===
Title	Publication year	Awards
Six Seconds	2008	
They Disappeared	2012	A Best Thriller of 2012 Selection - Library Journal
Into the Dark	2013	
The Only Human (Young Adult)	2014	
Before Sunrise (Short Novel)	2016	
Last Seen	2018	
Missing Daughter	2019	Winner Barry Award
The Lying House	2019	
Their Last Secret	2020	
Search for Her	2021	
Her Last Goodbye	2022	
Everything She Feared	2023	
Someone Saw Something	2024	
If Two Are Dead	2025	

=== Short stories ===
Title	Publication year	Awards
Dangerous Women & Desperte Men (Collection)	2011	
Three to the Heart (Collection)	2012	
Day of the Bone Thief (Collection)	2013	
Lightning Rider	2011	Winner Arthur Ellis Award
Blood Red Rings	2011	
Three Bullets to Queensland	2011	
As Long as We Both Shall Life	2011	Finalist Arthur Ellis Award
The Last Pursuit	2012	
A Lifetime Burning in a Moment	2012	
Backup	2012	Finalist Arthur Ellis Award, International Thriller Award
