= Rick LeGuerrier =

Canadian journalist and director

Rick LeGuerrier is a Canadian journalist, director and independent film producer. He is one of two founders of Dream Street Pictures, created in 2004 with Timothy M. Hogan.

== Career ==
Rick LeGuerrier was first a journalist reporting from Canada, the US and Europe, then as a broadcast executive, and, for the last decade, as an independent producer and partner in Dream Street.

=== Producing ===
LeGuerrier's works include documentary "The Zoo Revolution", which is now in production for CBC Television’s Doc Zone, and the television movie, The Phantoms, which was shown on the CBC. He produced Wild and Dangerous: The World of Exotic Pets for the CBC in 2015.

== Awards and nominations ==
LeGuerrier and projects he produced have been nominated for or received various awards including:

- 2014 International Kids Emmy
- WGC Screenwriting Awards
- Canadian Screen Awards
- 4 Gemini Nominations
- Won 2013 Shaw Rocket Prize (Youth/Family)
- Won Atlantic Journalism Awards: 1991 Citation of Merit Enterprise Reporting Radio, 1993 Gold Spot News Radio
