= Morgan Waters =

Canadian actor, comedian and musician (born 1981)

- Born: August 25, 1981 (age 45)

Morgan Waters (born August 25, 1981) is a Canadian actor, comedian and musician.

Waters was first seen on the CBC's children's program The X, which was cancelled in 2003. Born in Victoria, British Columbia, Waters moved to Toronto, Ontario, to host The Morgan Waters Show, which aired on CBC Television in 2006. Waters competed in the 2000 Much VJ search but lost to Bradford Howe. He later worked for the MuchMusic show Screwed Over in October 2006.

He created and appeared on the show Cock'd Gunns, which aired in 2007–2008 on the IFC.

He has been writing, directing and starring in the comedy web series The Amazing Gayl Pile since it premiered on JASH in 2014. It is now on NBC's digital channel Seeso.

Waters formerly played bass guitar for the Toronto-based Sweet Thing. He now plays in Toronto-based band Weaves, formed in 2013.
