= The Morgan Waters Show =

Canadian television series

The Morgan Waters Show is a six-minute sketch comedy show starring Morgan Waters, which ran as part of CBC Television's afternoon youth programming lineup in 2006. The series consists of short sketches in which Waters plays various characters, or appears as himself in various street pranks.

Guests appearing on the show include Canadian Idol hosts Ben Mulroney and Jon Dore, Rick Mercer, the cast of Degrassi: The Next Generation, Ashlee Simpson, Simple Plan, OK GO, Alexz Johnson, Ed the Sock, and Tyler Kyte among others.

The series won a Gemini Award for Best Children's or Youth Fiction Program or Series at the 21st Gemini Awards in 2006.
