= Matthew Kershaw =

Matthew Kershaw is a Canadian Gemini Award nominated television producer and film and television writer. He is the co-creator and producer of the award-winning series At the End of My Leash. At the End of My Leash is known in the United States as In the Dog House and currently airs on ION, and previously aired on Animal Planet.

== Awards ==
- 2012 AMPIA Award - Best Lifestyle Series for Puppy SOS
- 2010 AMPIA Award - Best Lifestyle Series for At the End of My Leash
- 2010 GOLDEN SHEAF Award Nomination (Yorkton Film Festival) - Best Lifestyle Series for At the End of My Leash
- 2009 GOLDEN SHEAF Award (Yorkton Film Festival) - Best Lifestyle Series for At the End of My Leash
- 2009 AMPIA Award Nomination - Best Lifestyle Series for At the End of My Leash
- 2008 GEMINI Award Nomination - Best Lifestyle Series for At the End of My Leash
- 2008 AMPIA Award - Best Lifestyle Series for At the End of My Leash
- 2007 AMPIA Award Nomination - Best Reality Series for At the End of My Leash
- 2006 AMPIA Award Nomination - Best Reality Series for Stepping In It
- 1993 AMPIA Award Nomination - Best Student Project
