= At the End of My Leash =

- Created by: Matthew Kershaw; Brad Pattison; Anthony Hart
- Starring: Brad Pattison
- Country of origin: Canada
- No. of seasons: 6
- No. of episodes: 78

Production
- Producers: Matthew Kershaw; Jean Merriman; Lisa Cichelly; Directed by Heather McCrae, Kelly Peckham, Eppo Eerkes.
- Running time: 30 minutes

Original release
- Network: Slice
- Release: March 4, 2007 – present

At the End of My Leash is a reality television program starring Brad Pattison. In the United States, At the End of My Leash aired in the late Summer/Fall 2009 under the title In the Dog House on Animal Planet.

The show follows dog trainer and human life coach Brad Pattison as he enters homes to solve problems with bad dog behaviour and fix the relationship problems that cause them.

The show was produced by Matthew Kershaw, who created the show with Brad Pattison and Anthony Hart. Executive Producer was Jean Merriman. Lisa Cichelly was the Supervising Producer. The show is a co-production between Purple Dog Media and White Iron Pictures.

The show premiered on the Slice on March 4, 2007. Season 2 premiered on Slice on October 15, 2007 and season 3 premiered on Slice on April 7, 2008. Season 4 debuted on Slice on December 16, 2008. The premiere of Season 5 of At the End of My Leash aired on May 6, 2009. Season 6 premiered on January 7, 2010.

== International screenings ==
At the End of My Leash also airs in Canada on Global, HGTV and The National Geographic Channel. In the United States, the show airs as In the Dog House on Animal Planet.

At the End of My Leash currently airs in the UK on Animal Planet. In South Africa and throughout Southern Africa it airs on The Home Channel. It also airs in Norway as På Plass! on FEM, in Sweden as Vem håller i kopplet? on SVT2, in France as Mon Chien M'rend Chevre on Gulli, and in Finland as Hännänheiluttajat on MTV3. The show also airs in Italian and German in those respective countries. The series is distributed by D360 Distribution.

== Press ==
The Hollywood Reporter considered At the End of My Leash one of the five titles most likely to generate buzz during the 2007 MIPTV Media Market.

The Daily Telegraph considered At the End of My Leash "One to Watch" on Friday, December 14, 2007, the day the show premiered in the UK.

On August 26, 2008, the Academy of Canadian Cinema and Television announced that At the End of My Leash received three Gemini Award nominations. The Gemini's are Canada's highest television awards. The Awards were presented on October 23, 2008.

On May 20, 2009, The Globe and Mail called the At the End of My Leash one of that week's highlights.

On July 11, 2009, and again on August 1, 2009 the Los Angeles Times listed In the Dog House as one of its Saturday Highlights.

August 1, 2009 also saw TV LEGION make In the Dog House one of its TV Picks.

== Awards ==
- 2010 AMPIA AWARD, Alberta Motion Picture Industries Award - Best Lifestyle Series - Matthew Kershaw, Jean Merriman, Brad Pattison - Producers
- 2010 AMPIA AWARD NOMINATION, Alberta Motion Picture Industries Award - Best Editor, Non-Fiction - James Francey
- 2010 AMPIA AWARD NOMINATION, Alberta Motion Picture Industries Award - Best Editor, Non-Fiction - Brent Waters
- 2010 GOLDEN SHEAF AWARD NOMINATION (Yorkton Film Festival) - Best Lifestyle Series - Matthew Kershaw, Jean Merriman, Brad Pattison - Producers
- 2009 GOLDEN SHEAF AWARD (Yorkton Film Festival) - Best Lifestyle Series - Matthew Kershaw, Jean Merriman, Brad Pattison - Producers
- 2009 AMPIA AWARD NOMINATION, Alberta Motion Picture Industries Award - Best Lifestyle Series - Matthew Kershaw, Jean Merriman, Brad Pattison - Producers
- 2009 AMPIA AWARD NOMINATION, Alberta Motion Picture Industries Award - Best Editor, Non-Fiction - James Francey
- 2009 AMPIA AWARD NOMINATION, Alberta Motion Picture Industries Award - Best Screenwriter, Non-Fiction - Heather McCrae
- 2009 AMPIA AWARD NOMINATION, Alberta Motion Picture Industries Award - Best Director, Non-Fiction - Heather McCrae
- 2008 GEMINI AWARD NOMINATION - Best Lifestyle Series - Matthew Kershaw, Jean Merriman, Brad Pattison - Producers
- 2008 GEMINI AWARD NOMINATION - Best Direction in a Lifestyle Series - Heather McCrae
- 2008 GEMINI AWARD NOMINATION - Best Editing in a Lifestyle Series - Glen Sakatch
- 2008 AMPIA AWARD, Alberta Motion Picture Industries Award - Best Lifestyle Series
- 2008 AMPIA AWARD, Alberta Motion Picture Industries Award - Best Editor, Non-Fiction - Brent Waters
- 2008 AMPIA AWARD, Alberta Motion Picture Industries Award - Best Screenwriter, Non-Fiction - Heather McCrae
- 2008 AMPIA AWARD, Alberta Motion Picture Industries Award - Best Host - Brad Pattison
- 2008 AMPIA AWARD NOMINATION, Alberta Motion Picture Industries Award - Best Editor, Non-Fiction - Steve Katakami
- 2008 AMPIA AWARD NOMINATION, Alberta Motion Picture Industries Award - Best Director, Non-Fiction - Heather McCrae
- 2007 AMPIA AWARD NOMINATION, Alberta Motion Picture Industries Award – Best Documentary/Reality Series - Matthew Kershaw, Jean Merriman, Brad Pattison - Producers
- 2007 AMPIA AWARD NOMINATION, Alberta Motion Picture Industries Award – Best Director, Reality Series - Eppo Eerkes & Heather McCrae
- 2007 AMPIA AWARD NOMINATION, Alberta Motion Picture Industries Award – Best Host, Male,- Brad Pattison
- 2007 AMPIA AWARD NOMINATION, Alberta Motion Picture Industries Award – Best Screenwriter, Reality Series - Heather McCrae
