= Clare Stone =

Canadian actress

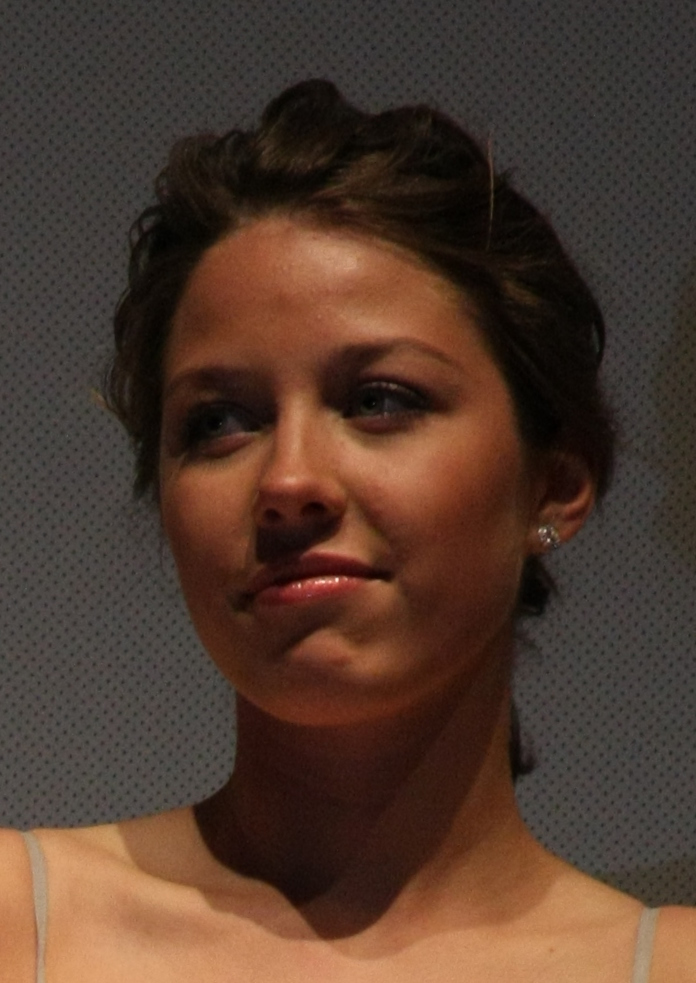
Stone in 2009

Clare Stone is a Canadian nurse and former actress.

== Career ==
Stone has appeared in movies and television works such as Would Be Kings, The Jane Show, Breach, Mom at Sixteen, Samantha: An American Girl Holiday, Godsend, Shattered City: The Halifax Explosion, Beautiful Girl, and Mr. Nobody. She has also starred in CBC Television's Wild Roses as Charlotte Henry and in the episode "Run to Me" of CTV's Flashpoint series as Sarah Porter. She was nominated for a Gemini Award, Best Performance by an Actress in a Featured Supporting Role in a Dramatic Program or Mini-Series, in 2008.

She has retired from acting and now works as a psychiatric nurse and researcher.

== Personal life ==
Stone married Noah Reid in July 2020, and their first child, a son, was born in late summer 2022.

== Filmography ==
=== Film ===
Year	Title	Role	Notes
2003	Water's Edge	Meredith Tanner	Uncredited
2004	Godsend	School Girl #5	
2007	Breach	Lisa Hanssen	
2009	Mr. Nobody	Elise age 15	

=== Television ===
Year	Title	Role	Notes
2003	Beautiful Girl	Mona Spellman	Television film
2003	Shattered City: The Halifax Explosion	Constance 'Connie' Collins	2 episodes
2004	Samantha: An American Girl Holiday	Emma	Television film
2005	Vinegar Hill	Amy Grier	Television film
2005	I Do, They Don't	Lily Barber	Television film
2005	Mom at Sixteen	Macy	Television film
2005	The Stranger I Married	Tara Evanshen	Television film
2006–2007	The Jane Show	Young Jane	5 episodes
2007	The Altar Boy Gang	Donna	Television film
2007	Mixed Blessings	Vicky	6 episodes
2008	Would Be Kings	—N/a	2 episodes
2009	Wild Roses	Charlotte Henry	13 episodes
2011	Being Erica	Shauna Reycraft	Episode: "Being Ethan"
2012	Rookie Blue	Stella Alvarez	Episode: "Class Dismissed"
2012	Flashpoint	Sarah Porter	Episode: "Run To Me"
2016, 2017	Murdoch Mysteries	Anne Baxter	2 episodes
2017	The Peter Austin Noto Show	Bell cap	Episode #5.7
