= East Coast Sessions =

- Genre: Music
- Country of origin: Canada
- Original language: English
- No. of seasons: 1
- No. of episodes: 9

Production
- Production location: Halifax, Nova Scotia

Original release
- Network: CBC (Maritime stations only)
- Release: April 1 – May 9, 2008

East Coast Sessions is a Canadian English language television series. East Coast Sessions debuted on April 1, 2008 at 7:30 p.m. AST on the CBC affiliated Maritime stations. The series would later be broadcast nationally on the CBC-owned specialty channel, bold, beginning September 3, 2008. The series was produced by Geoff D'Eon (This Hour Has 22 Minutes, East Coast Music Awards). It was nominated for two 2008 Gemini Awards in the categories, "Best Music or Variety Program or Series" and "Best Sound in a Music or Variety Program or Series").

== Premise ==
East Coast Sessions is a music performance series where each episode features two artists from Atlantic Canada in an intimate concert setting.

The series was taped over 2 weeks in the summer of 2007 at the CBC's studios in Halifax, Nova Scotia.

== Episodes ==
Air Date	Bands
April 1, 2008	Meaghan Smith, Old Man Luedecke
April 14, 2008	Joel Plaskett, Fall Horsie
April 18, 2008	Jenn Grant, Andrew White
April 21, 2008	Hey Rosetta!, Amelia Curran
April 25, 2008	Jill Barber, Andrew White
April 28, 2008	Rose Cousins, Nathan Wiley
May 2, 2008	David Myles, Rose Cousins
May 5, 2008	Gordie Sampson, Fall Horsie
May 9, 2008	Catherine MacLellan, Joel Plaskett
