= She's Crafty =

Canadian TV program

She's Crafty is a Canadian TV program about making decorative crafts at home. Hosted by Wendy Russell, it is produced by Omni Film Productions for HGTV Canada, also airing on Fine Living Canada. In the United States, it airs over the air on Ion Life rather than HGTV or Fine Living. Most of the projects that Wendy showed required no special talent or skills.
