= Lisa Gabriele =

Lisa Gabriele is a Canadian novelist, television producer and journalist. She was the show runner for Dragons' Den (2006–2012).

Gabriele is the bestselling author of The Winters, Tempting Faith DiNapoli and The Almost Archer Sisters. The Winters, a reimagining of Daphne du Maurier's Rebecca, was published in Canada, the U.K., Portugal, and the U.S. in the fall of 2018.

In February 2013, it was revealed on The Current that Lisa Gabriele is the true identity of the pseudonym L. Marie Adeline, author of the erotic novel S.E.C.R.E.T., published in 31 countries. It has since been turned into a trilogy.

Her essays and fiction have appeared in several anthologies, including Dave Eggers' The Best American Nonrequired Reading, Sex and Sensibility, Don't You Forget About Me, When I Was a Loser, and 2033: The Future of Misbehavior. She lives in Toronto, where she graduated from the Ryerson School of Journalism in 1992.

Her writing has appeared in The New York Times Magazine, The Washington Post, Vice, Salon, Glamour, among other publications, and she was a regular contributor to Nerve. She has worked as a director and/or producer for CBC, for programs such as Dragons' Den, The Week the Women Went, and she wrote the CBC radio program The Current from 2003 to 2006. As well, she has produced or directed programs for the History Channel, the Life Network and Slice TV. She's been nominated for four Geminis, and has won twice. She won the Screen Award for best Reality TV show in 2013. She was head of development for Proper Television from 2014 to 2016, and Antica Productions, until March, 2023.
