= The Englishman's Boy =

1996 novel by Guy Vanderhaeghe

- Trade Paperback Edition
- Author: Guy Vanderhaeghe
- Language: English
- Genre: Historical fiction
- Publisher: McClelland & Stewart
- Publication date: 14 September 1996
- Publication place: Canada
- Media type: Hardcover and Paperback
- Pages: 333
- ISBN: 0-7710-8693-8
- OCLC: 35941592

The Englishman's Boy is a novel by Guy Vanderhaeghe, published in 1996 by McClelland and Stewart, which won the Governor General's Award for English-language fiction in 1996 and was nominated for the Giller Prize. It deals with the events of the Cypress Hills Massacre (1873) as told 50 years later to a young screenwriter in Hollywood by the last living survivor.

== Television adaptation ==
On 2 March 2008, The Englishman's Boy premiered as a miniseries on CBC with a budget of $11.7 million. The series won six Gemini Awards: Best Dramatic Mini-Series; John N. Smith as director; Nicholas Campbell as leading actor; Katharine Isabelle as supporting actress; Carmen Kotyk, for casting; and Beverley Wowchuk for costumes.

In November 2017 the miniseries was released on the Canada Media Fund Encore+ YouTube channel.
