= Clifford Barry =

Canadian water polo player (1946–2021)

Personal information
- Born: June 1, 1946; Montreal, Quebec, Canada
- Died: August 21, 2021 (aged 75); Montreal, Quebec, Canada

Sport
- Sport: Water polo

Clifford Barry (June 1, 1946 – August 21, 2021) was a Canadian water polo player. He competed at the 1972 Summer Olympics and the 1976 Summer Olympics. He died in Montreal on August 21, 2021 at the age of 75.
