= True Pulp Murder =

- Created by: Lynn Booth, Make Believe Media
- Country of origin: Canada
- No. of episodes: 13

Production
- Running time: 30 minutes

Original release
- Network: Mystery TV
- Release: September 13, 2007

True Pulp Murder is a 30-minute documentary series that examines real murder cases from the point of view of the detectives who investigated them with commentary from actual murder mystery authors, while being told in a graphic novel style.

== Episodes ==
No.	Title	Cop	Author
1	"Double Confession"	Bob Marshall	Michael Slade
Gloria Vandov, an alcoholic housewife, is found behind a backstop at a neighborhood playing field, brutally attacked, her head crushed with a large rock. The police follow up some sketchy leads and must deal with the victim's erratic husband to get to the truth behind this heinous crime.
2	"A Dead Weight"	Garry Vath	Mary Jane Maffini
When a dead crack addict, June Grimshaw, is left in a duffel bag by a dumpster in alley, the police dig deep into her past to determine if this is a dumped body, or if it's a case of murder.
3	"Deadly Relations"	Mark Mendelson	Karen Dudley
Zohura Zakiyah, an immigrant from Pakistan, is tied up and put out with the trash by the curb. With no apparent cause of death, and only a tiny puncture wound on her hand to go on, the police are baffled. How did she die, and who is responsible?
4	"Straight To the Heart"	Tom Anderson	David Russell
Naomi Grant is stabbed repeatedly while asleep in her bed. The police are puzzled by the remarkable lack of blood at the scene, and troubled by the secrets the victim kept and the surprising number of suspects they uncover.
5	"A Bloody Mess"	Michael Slade	Garry Vath
Lou Anne Ferris is violently attacked - slashed and stabbed by an unidentified man. Her boyfriend Al Patel is also injured in the attack and leads the police on a hunt for Lou Anne's killer.
6	"Deadly Payback"	Bob Marshall	Daniel Kalla
Rival biker gangs square off in a turf war, resulting in a massacre at the home of one gang member. The police have a good idea why and how the hit occurred, but are hard pressed to determine exactly who carried out the hit.
7	"Death To The Dealer"	Tom Anderson	Rick Mofina
Eldon Sawchuk, a small-time pill dealer, is found dead on his kitchen floor, the victim of a fatal beating. Fingerprints in his house have the police rounding up a who's who of local addicts, regulars to Sawchuk's place. But did one of them actually kill him?
8	"Homme Fatale"	Bob Cooper	Michael Slade
When resort hotel manager Raymond Gilmore doesn't show up for work after a weekend at his apartment in the city, his employees become concerned and contact missing persons. Has Raymond Gilmore willingly disappeared, or has something bad happened to him?
9	"99 Bottle Of Beer"	Tom Anderson	Rick Mofina
Reports of a struggle under a bridge have police stumped when only traces of blood and some footprints are discovered at the scene. With no body anywhere to be found and the identity of the victim a mystery, the police have no clue what crime, if any, has been committed.
10	"Happy New Year"	Bob Marshall	Mary Jane Maffini
Nancy Garrett, a kindly senior citizen, enjoys New Year's Eve alone in her home. The next day, she is found dead in her bathtub, and her house has been ransacked. The police round up some surprising suspects in an attempt to solve this shocking murder.
11	"Death, Lies & Videotape"	Mark Mendelson	Karen Dudley
A Marvin Fleming, a former big time sound technician, is stabbed to death in a busy shopping area. When the police get nothing definite from eyewitnesses, they use the media and clever detective work to flush out the killers.
12	"Shoot First"	Bob Marshall	Rick Mofina
When a grocery store holdup leaves a young man, Ian Park, dead on the street, the police use an unlikely array of evidence and some dogged legwork to track down the culprits.
13	"A Long Slow Death"	Bob Cooper	Dan Kalla
Henrietta Vallat dies after a prolonged and unexplained illness, her grieving husband by her side. A determined doctor continues to investigate the cause of death and comes up with a startling revelation that leads police to her murderer.

== Creators ==
- Lynn Booth - Producer
- Larisa Andrews – Co-Producer
- Larry Raskin – Creative Producer
- Brendan Woolard – Director
- Andrew West – Illustrator
