= Cock'd Gunns =

Cock'd Gunns is a Canadian English language mockumentary television series originally produced for IFC and later broadcast on Showcase. The series documents the lives of members of the fictional rock band Cock'd Gunns, as they try to become the biggest band in the world. The show is a production of Tricon Films & Television, and it was directed by Samir Rehem.

== Premise ==
Lead singer/songwriter Reggie Van Gunn and bassist Dick Van Gunn are brothers living together for the first time since they were kids. The Van Gunn brothers form the nucleus of Cock'd Gunns, while novice drummer Barry Ciccarelli tries to keep the beat and rookie manager Keith Horvak provides leadership. Together, these four form a rock band with no brains, no fans and no record deal, only high hopes as they try to become the biggest band in the world.

== Cast ==
- Morgan Waters, as Reggie Van Gunn (songwriter/vocals/lead guitar)
- Andy King, as Dick Van Gunn (bass)
- Brooks Gray, as Barry Ciccarelli (drums)
- Leo Scherman, as Keith Horvak (manager)

Cock'd Gunns also features the regular performers:

- Inessa Frantowski - Annie Frantowski (Dick's girlfriend)
- Rebecca McMahon - Becky Jones (Barry's stepsister)
- Christine Crawford - Cougar #1 a.k.a. *Christine* (picked up by Keith Horvak, the band's manager)
- Samuel Essery - Dax (Christine's oldest Son)
- Theodore Essery - Brody (Christine's youngest Son)

== Awards ==
=== 2008 Gemini Awards ===
- Winner, Best Writing in a Comedy or Variety Program or Series (Brooks Gray, Andy King, Leo Scherman, Morgan Waters)
- Winner, Best Ensemble Performance in a Comedy Program or Series (Brooks Gray, Andy King, Leo Scherman, Morgan Waters, Inessa Frantowski, Rebecca McMahon).
- Nominee for Best Comedy Program or Series (Andrea Gorfolova of Tricon Films & Television, Shaam Makan of Tricon Films & Television, Brooks Gray, Andy King, Leo Scherman, Morgan Waters)

=== 2008 Canadian Comedy Awards ===
Director Samir Rehem won best TV direction for the episode, "On The Road, Part 1".

== Background on Cock'd Gunns ==
Cock'd Gunns was an original creation by Morgan Waters, Andy King and Leo Scherman. Brooks Gray was brought in later as the fourth producer/writer/actor. Produced by Tricon Films & Television, IFC (Independent Film Channel) Canada ordered 13 episodes of the show and the show premiered on IFC Canada on December 1, 2007. Cock'd Gunns was also shown on Showcase.

Cock'd Gunns scripts consist of scene-by-scene outlines, but all of the dialogue and character confessionals to the camera are improvised.

Morgan Waters composed all of the original Cock'd Gunns songs and much of the other music and score for the show.

TV shows and films to which Cock'd Gunns is often compared: This is Spinal Tap!; Trailer Park Boys; The Office (UK); Fubar; Arrested Development; The Hills; Flight of the Conchords.

== Background on the writer/producer/lead actors ==
Andy King, Leo Scherman and Brooks Gray met and became friends as first-year students at McGill University in 1993. The three have collaborated on several film and video projects since then and created (with two other friends, Daragh Sankey and Andrew Prior) a sketch comedy website, skitfaced.com, which features dozens of videos and enjoys a cult following.

King, Scherman and Gray came to know Waters when they were hired to write and produce episodes of Waters' Gemini Award-winning CBC comedy series, The Morgan Waters Show (2006). Morgan had been a host on the CBC's The X before creating The Morgan Waters Show.

Scherman and Waters later worked on MuchMusic hidden camera show, Screwed Over (also produced by Tricon Films and Television) with Scherman as writer/director of the series and Waters a featured performer and writer. King and Gray contributed as writers and actors on a few episodes of Screwed Over.

Morgan Waters is the bassist for EMI recording artists, Sweet Thing.

Prior to Cock'd Gunns, King and Gray worked in MuchMusic's Creative Services department, producing dozens of promos, station IDs, ads, show openings and public service announcements, claiming several industry awards including BDA/Promax recognition.
