= The Master (American TV series) =

1984 American action-adventure series

- Genre: Action-adventure
- Created by: Michael Sloan
- Written by: Tom Sawyer; Michael Sloan; Susan Woollen
- Directed by: Ray Austin; Ray Aystub; Michael Caffee; Peter Crane; Robert Clouse; Sidney Hayers; Gordon Hessler; Bruce Kessler; Alan Myerson
- Starring: Lee Van Cleef; Timothy Van Patten; Sho Kosugi
- Theme music composer: Bill Conti
- Composers: Bill Conti; Les Hooper
- Country of origin: United States
- Original language: English
- No. of seasons: 1
- No. of episodes: 13

Production
- Executive producer: Michael Sloan
- Producers: Joe Boston; Nigel Watts
- Running time: 44 minutes
- Production companies: Michael Sloan Productions; Viacom Productions

Original release
- Network: NBC
- Release: January 20 – August 31, 1984

The Master is an American action-adventure television series, which aired on NBC from January to August 1984. Created by Michael Sloan, the series focuses on the adventures of John Peter McAllister (Lee Van Cleef), an aging ninja master, and his young pupil, Max Keller (Timothy Van Patten). Most episodes focus on the mismatched pair driving around in a custom van, helping people in need along the way, similar to the contemporary NBC television series, The A-Team. The Master lasted 13 episodes before it was cancelled.

== Premise ==
The Master follows John Peter McAllister, an American veteran who stayed in Japan following World War II and became a ninja master. At the beginning of the series, McAllister, now an old man, leaves Japan for the United States in search of a daughter he did not know he had. This flight from his ninja life is seen as dishonorable by his fellow ninjas, including his former student, Okasa (Sho Kosugi), who attempts to assassinate him. Escaping with a minor wound, McAllister finds himself in the small town of Ellerston, where he believes his daughter resides. Along the way, he meets a drifter named Max Keller, who aids the ninja master in a bar fight, but is subsequently thrown through a window, a recurring event for the hot-headed Keller. Max desires to learn to fight like a ninja, but McAllister is reluctant to train him, feeling him to be too emotional. When Keller gets involved in a dispute between Mr. Christensen (Clu Gulager), a ruthless developer, and the Trumbulls (Claude Akins, Demi Moore), a father and his daughter who run an airport targeted by Christensen, McAllister decides to train him to survive.

The pair go on to have many adventures traveling the country in search of McAllister's daughter, although the show was cancelled before she is ever found. Keller and McAllister often get sidetracked by oppressed people, and invariably McAllister uses his ninja skills to help.

The character of Teri McAllister triggers John Peter McAllister's return to America by writing a letter to him. She is constantly on the move, and has been spotted in New Orleans (about six months to a year before she contacted her father; she was already using his surname at the time) Ellerston, Atlanta, and New York - working briefly but very successfully as a fashion model in the last city. She is secretive about her personal information, never giving out an address or a phone number. In her modelling career, she rebuffed the villainous fashion designer and jewel thief Simon Garrett when he tried to romance her, and was on friendly terms with Gina, an FBI agent posing as an executive at the modelling agency. After Teri moved on, Gina impersonated her in order to trap Garrett, becoming entangled with Keller and McAllister in the process. Teri does not appear to have been aware of Gina's profession, and Gina's impersonation is aimed at people who don't know Teri well, so her behavior in the role should not be taken as necessarily typical of the other woman's. Teri herself is only seen in photographs: she appears as a strikingly attractive woman, somewhere in her mid or early twenties (despite dialogue in "Fat Tuesday" indicating her to be 28 or 29), with dark blue eyes and heavy black hair. She is the result of a two-month affair between McAllister and a woman called Laura Kennedy, at the end of the Korean War. McAllister asks Gina with sincere curiosity about Teri's mother, in a way that suggests he still has some interest in the mother of his daughter and believes her to be alive. In addition to her brief modelling career, she was also a pilot of racing planes for a time (circa her visit to New Orleans). Most information about her comes from "Fat Tuesday" and "The Good, the Bad, and the Priceless", both stories about women who know her vaguely and use her name to trap a villain.

A recurring enemy is Okasa, the rogue pupil of McAllister, who continually tracks his old master down and tries to kill him. In the first episode, the two duel and McAllister wins. However, the old master refuses to kill his opponent, preferring to renounce his ninja ways, allowing Okasa to make further attempts in future episodes.

=== Opening credits ===
John Peter McAllister, the only Occidental American to achieve the martial arts discipline of a ninja. Once part of a secret sect he wanted to leave, but was marked for death by his fellow ninjas. He's searching for a daughter he didn't know he had; pursued by Okasa, once the Master's student, now sworn to kill him. That Master found a new student. That's me, Max Keller. But we knew Okasa would be behind us, in the shadows, ready to strike again.

== Cast and characters ==
- Lee Van Cleef as John Peter McAllister aka "The Master": A World War II and Korean War veteran who stayed in Japan and became the first Occidental ninja. Trained Okasa in the ninja arts before he returned to America and taking on Max Keller as his student. A self-described "cantankerous old man who's lived alone a lot of years", he is a stern but fair teacher, and a skilled fighter, though his age is catching up with him. Often grumpy and sarcastic towards other men, both friend and foe, but somewhat more mellow around Max, and politely flirtatious or self-consciously "charming" towards women. Several pieces of his colorful history appear throughout the series: he flew P-40s during WWII ("Hostages", "Juggernaut"), visited New York in 1938 ("The Good, the Bad and the Priceless"), and attended a sort of conference of secret assassin organizations in the Far East in 1972, where he gave a martial arts demonstration ("The Good, the Bad and the Priceless"). He met Brian Elkwood in Washington DC in 1948, and the two men were subsequently imprisoned together in North Korea, but escaped by using a motorcycle ("Kunoichi"). He has apparently visited Hawaii about twenty years ago: a friend who lives there has a daughter Max's age, whom McAllister remembers seeing when she was a baby ("Java Tiger"). He denies having filmed Westerns in Almería, Spain with (fictional) actor Saul Robbins c. 1969 ("Rogues"), but his reactions to Robbins's claim to remember him seem to suggest otherwise-he was perhaps on some kind of secret mission for which the film(s) made a good cover. He "always wanted to be a cowboy" ("High Rollers"), but makes not wanting to dress up as one an excuse to turn down an ad exec who wants McAllister to shill for him ("The Good, the Bad and the Priceless"). There are several recurring trains of thought that show up in his conversation, e.g. Eastern mysticism, but the closest thing he has to a catchphrase is probably "no kidding", said in an exasperated tone to people's more obvious statements.
- Timothy Van Patten as Max Keller: A drifter who spends most of his time driving around in his custom van and taking odd jobs wherever he can find them. He has a pet hamster (or possibly a gerbil) named Henry who lives in a dash-mounted, wheel-shaped cage. There are several indications that he has some money to fall back on: his van's customizations (hamster cage, souped-up engine, semi-bullet-proofing), the fact that he keeps an expensive-looking dirt bike ("State of the Union") and can afford to rent an ultralight plane ("Hostages"). He often gets thrown out of bar windows. He has a bit of a temper, but is learning to keep that in check due to McAllister's training. Max never passes up a chance to get friendly with a pretty woman of his own age. Max is initially estranged from his father-a lawyer who sank into alcoholism ("Failure to Communicate") after Max's mother and older brother died in a plane crash ("High Rollers") -but the two reconcile late in the series. Max's mother wanted him to be an accountant. Max went to the high school prom with a girlfriend who wanted to be a dancer on Broadway but ended up working in Vegas and having a child by someone else ("Hostages", "High Rollers"). At aforementioned prom, he shared a dance with the class nerd, who he meets again in the course of the series and become involved with ("Rogues"). He grew up on the East Side of New York ("The Good, the Bad and the Priceless"), though his father lives in California ("Failure to Communicate").
- Sho Kosugi as Okasa: A deadly ninja warrior once trained by McAllister. He has sworn to kill his former master due to his abandonment of the ninja code. Has engaged McAllister on several occasions with different levels of success. He is also a master of disguise. By the finale, he has himself trained at least one "Occidental" as a ninja. In his last duel with McAllister, he believes he is winning, and even manages to break the Master's ninja-to, but loses when McAllister turns his overconfidence against him. He sometimes takes espionage-related "jobs" while pursuing his former master, but is more often working at cross-purposes to the villain of the episode.
  - Kosugi also served as Van Cleef's fight double, as well as the series' fight choreographer, ninja technical advisor and stunt coordinator.

== Episodes ==
No.	Title	Original release date
1	"Max"	January 20, 1984
Peter McAllister, an American veteran who stayed in Japan following World War II and became a ninja master, returns to the United States in search of a daughter he did not know he had. This flight from his ninja life is seen as dishonorable by his fellow ninjas, including his former student, Okasa (Sho Kosugi), who attempts to assassinate him. Escaping with a minor wound, McAllister finds himself in the small town of Ellerston, where he believes his daughter resides. On the way, he meets a drifter named Max Keller, who aids the ninja master in a bar fight, but is subsequently thrown through a window. Max desires to learn to fight like a ninja, but McAllister is reluctant to train him, feeling him to be too emotional. When Max becomes involved in a dispute between ruthless developer Mr. Christensen and the Trumbulls, a father and daughter who run an airport targeted by Christensen, McAllister decides to train him to survive. Guest stars: Claude Akins, Demi Moore, Clu Gulager, John Lehne and Bill McKinney
2	"Out-of-Time Step"	January 27, 1984
A ninja-guarded crime lord mistakes Max and McAllister for bodyguards hired by a nightclub owner the crime lord is trying to control. Guest stars: Charles Collins, Soon-Teck Oh, Lori Lethin, Shanna Reed and Brian Tochi
3	"State of the Union"	February 3, 1984
Max befriends a "biker chick" who is trying to organize a union at the cannery where she works; he and McAllister strike back when the cannery owner tries to strong-arm the girl and the union. Guest stars: Crystal Bernard and Cotter Smith
4	"Hostages"	February 10, 1984
McAllister is accused by a secret agent of helping a band of terrorists; to prove his innocence, he must help rescue the hostages that the terrorists have taken. Guest stars: David McCallum, George Lazenby, Jennifer Runyon, Monte Markham and Randi Brooks
5	"High Rollers"	March 2, 1984
A former girlfriend of Max's becomes a pawn in a Las Vegas heist when her daughter is held hostage to ensure her cooperation. The resulting adventure leads Max and McAllister to a deserted Western film set, where the Master makes himself very much at home. Guest stars: Art Hindle, Edward Edwards, Terri Treas and Sandra Kronemeyer
6	"Fat Tuesday"	March 9, 1984
During Mardi Gras, a reporter uses Teri McAllister's name as a cover for her own sources, hoping to bring down a respected local citizen who is secretly running guns to Arab terrorists. Max and McAllister become entangled as a result. Guest stars: Robert Pine, Susan Kase, Mike Genovese, Floyd Levine and Mabel King
7	"Juggernaut"	March 16, 1984
Max and McAllister help a mother and daughter organize the local farmers against an evil land baron. McAllister has more success romancing the mother than Max does with the daughter, and the old man's "pre-ninja" background as a military pilot is emphasized. Guest stars: Stuart Whitman, Diana Muldaur, Tara Buckman, William Smith, Burton Gilliam and Robert Tessier
8	"The Good, the Bad and the Priceless"	March 23, 1984
Caught between a criminal mastermind and an FBI agent posing as McAllister's daughter, the two leads find themselves forced to steal the Crown Jewels of England. Guest stars: George Maharis, Tara Buckman, Colby Chester, Oliver Clark, Johnny Seven and Janine Turner
9	"Kunoichi"	April 6, 1984
With the help of a female pupil, Okasa puts in motion a plan to frame McAllister for the murder of an old friend, now a prominent government official. Guest stars: Jack Kelly, Kelly Harmon and Rick Hill
10	"The Java Tiger"	April 13, 1984
Max and McAllister take a break from the search for Teri to help out a friend of McAllister's: a bumbling Hawaii PI, who is on a quest for a legendary tiger made of gold. Unfortunately, a Bond-villain-like crime lord with a penchant for karate is also interested in the Java Tiger. Guest stars: Kabir Bedi, Cynthia Cypert, Anthony De Longis and Dick O'Neill
11	"Failure to Communicate"	May 4, 1984
Max reunites with his estranged father, the pawn in a kidnapping scheme. Max is so preoccupied with family affairs that McAllister ends up chaperoning the two "damsel in distress" characters, just about everywhere. Guest stars: J.D. Cannon, Doug McClure, Edd Byrnes, Mark Goddard, Marc Alaimo, Rebecca Holden and Ashley Ferrare
12	"Rogues"	August 10, 1984
A high school friend of Max's is now a cop, on the run from a band of corrupt colleagues. A woman who runs a gym harasses McAllister about being out of shape. Guest stars: Kaz Garas, Cindy Harrell and Paul Tulley
13	"A Place to Call Home"	August 31, 1984
Max and McAllister protect an orphanage from greedy land developers, with Max playing surrogate father to a troubled teen. Guest stars: Jock O'Mahoney, Susan Woollen, Hunter von Leer, James Gammon, Garry Pagett, Kane Kosugi and Doug Toby

== Cancellation ==
The Master did not attract an audience large enough to keep it on the air. It was cancelled after 13 episodes.

== Ratings ==
Season	Episodes	Start date	End date	Nielsen rank	Nielsen rating
1983–84	13	January 20, 1984	August 31, 1984	85	11.0 (Note: Tied with American Parade)

== Home media ==
During the mid 1980s, the show was re-edited into a series of 90-minute movies, each containing two episodes. These were released on VHS under a number of different titles:

North America	Europe	Japan
The Master Ninja	The Ninja Master	ザ忍者マスター1
The Master Ninja 2	The Ninja Master II	ザ忍者マスター2
The Master Ninja 3	The Return of the Ninja Master	ザ忍者マスター3
The Master Ninja 4	Ninja – The Shadows Kill	ザ忍者マスター4
The Master Ninja 5	Ninja – Warrior of the Night	ザ忍者マスター5
The Master Ninja 6	The Ninja Strikes!	ザ忍者マスター6
The Master Ninja 7	The Ninja Man	ザ忍者マスター7

The first two episodes ("Max" and "Out Of Time Step") were also released on VHS by Platinum Disc Corporation with the original series title in 1999. These same two episodes also appeared in the Martial Arts DVD 50-movie pack produced by Mill Creek Entertainment in 2006.

The entire, unedited series was released on DVD and Blu-ray by Kino Lorber under license from CBS Home Entertainment on February 20, 2018.

== Legacy ==
=== Mystery Science Theater 3000 ===
The series was featured on Mystery Science Theater 3000, a sketch comedy television series about a man and two robots subjected to cheesy B movies as part of a mad scientist's experiment. The show featured the first two volumes of the re-edited Master Ninja tapes on episodes 322 (originally aired January 11, 1992) and 324 (originally aired January 25, 1992). Notable jokes include jabs at Van Cleef's obvious stunt double and Van Patten's muffled speech pattern and heavy New York accent. Both episodes were released on Mystery Science Theater 3000, Volume XX on March 8, 2011.

The third volume was intended for episode 624, but, for unspecified reasons, was replaced by Samson vs. the Vampire Women.

=== This Movie Sucks! ===
The pilot episode was featured on the similarly oriented show This Movie Sucks! which is hosted by Ed the Sock, Liana K and Ron Sparks. Shown as part of the season two opener and shown as a double feature alongside Jesse James Meets Frankenstein's Daughter, the showing was notable for Sparks' "Roninja" gag, which quickly became a favorite among fans.

=== References in other media ===
- There is a link to The Master in the game Ninja Master by Firebird, for the ZX Spectrum and likely other systems as well. The Ninja Master theme is exactly the same as that of The Master.
