= Ursus (film) =

Mighty Ursus (Ursus, Son of Hercules)
- Directed by: Carlo Campogalliani
- Written by: Giuseppe Mangione; Giuliano Carnimeo; Sergio Sollima
- Produced by: Italo Zingarelli
- Starring: Ed Fury; Moira Orfei; Cristina Gaioni; Mariangela Giordano; Mary Marlon; Soledad Miranda
- Cinematography: Eloy Mella
- Edited by: Franco Fraticelli; Julio Peña
- Music by: Roman Vlad
- Production companies: Cine Italia Film; Atenea Film
- Distributed by: Filmar/ UA
- Release date: 1 February 1961 (Italy)
- Running time: 95 minutes
- Countries: Italy; Spain
- Language: Italian

Ursus (also known as Mighty Ursus) is a 1961 Italian peplum film directed by Carlo Campogalliani. It was originally theatrically released in the US on a double bill with Jack, the Giant Killer (1962) before being sold to television in the U.S. The film was later released to American television retitled Ursus, Son of Hercules. First in the Ursus trilogy, followed by Ursus nella valle dei leoni (Italian release date: 21.12.1961; U.S. release as Ursus in the valley of the lions) and Ursus nella terra di fuoco (Italian release date: 08.1963; U.S. release as Ursus in the land of fire).

Filmed in Madrid in 1960, and released in Italy on 1 February 1961, this movie stars bodybuilder Ed Fury as the legendary Ursus, and Moira Orfei as the evil queen Attea, in a sword-and-sandal adventure. Ed Fury is the actor most often associated with the Ursus series, although he only played him in three of the nine films. The film is rife with villains, in the true peplum tradition, including Moira Orfei as the evil queen, Luis Prendes as the smarmy Setas, and Rafael Luis Calvo as Mok, the grand vizier.

A young Soledad Miranda plays the beautiful virgin Fillide who is to be sacrificed at the end of the film. Miranda was later "discovered" by Spanish horror film director Jesus Franco who used her in a number of his 1969-1970 productions, beginning with his 1970 opus Count Dracula. (She was killed in a car accident in 1970).

== Plot ==
To defend his countrymen, the mighty Ursus goes off to war in a foreign land, a war that lasts several years. Victorious, he returns home planning to marry his fiancée Attea, only to learn that she had been kidnapped in his absence by a bizarre religious cult that inhabits a far off island. Ursus enlists the aid of a young blind slave girl, Doreide, whom he used to know as a child, and together they embark on a quest to locate and rescue his lost Attea. Unbeknownst to Ursus, Doreide is in love with him, but doesn't let Ursus know, since she feels he will only be happy if he is reunited with Attea.

After overcoming various villains who do not want him to locate the cult's island base, Ursus and Doreide finally arrive on the island, only to be captured by the cult and their masked queen, an evil woman who orders the sacrificing of virgins to her satanic bull-god.

Much to his dismay, Ursus learns that the queen is in fact his ex-fiancée Attea. After being kidnapped by the cult, Attea had somehow managed to trick the cultists into making her their leader, and over the past three years, she degenerated into a cold, heartless monster. The queen commands that Doreide be sacrificed, and Ursus is sent in chains to slave in a hellish work camp.

Ursus manages to escape his captivity and kill the treacherous Setas, an old friend of Ursus' who he learns orchestrated the kidnapping of Attea years before. Ursus then makes his way to the great arena, just in time to rescue Doreide from being mauled to death by a massive bull. Ursus physically wrestles the bull to the ground in a spectacular battle of sinews, and then leads a slave revolt against the queen and her sycophants. In the battle, Doreide receives a blow to the head which miraculously restores her vision. The queen is stabbed to death by her own grand vizier Mok, who in turn is strangled by Ursus.

With the freeing of the slaves, Ursus and Doreide sail off back to their homeland, with Ursus finally realizing that Doreide is the only woman for him. (Strangely, none of the other Ursus films involve the Doreide character, so it's a mystery why she disappeared so quickly from the series after this first film.) Ursus is shown as a very violent character in this film, actually strangling several of the other characters to death in various scenes when he could easily have just rendered them unconscious.

== Cast ==
- Ed Fury as Ursus
- Mary Marlon as Doreide, the blind girl
- Moira Orfei as Queen Attea
- Cristina Gajoni as Magali
- Luis Prendes as Setas
- Rafael Luis Calvo as Mok
- Mario Scaccia as Kymos
- Mariangela Giordano as Myriam
- Nino Fuscagni as Carovaniere
- Soledad Miranda as Fillide, the virgin
- Antonio Gil as Adelfo

== Bibliography ==
- Roberto Poppi, Mario Pecorari (2007). Dizionario del cinema italiano. I film. Rome: Gremese Editore. ISBN 978-8884405036.
- Hughes, Howard (2011). Cinema Italiano - The Complete Guide From Classics To Cult. London - New York: I.B.Tauris. ISBN 978-1-84885-608-0.
