= Fromage (special) =

- Logo of the 2005 edition of Fromage
- Country of origin: Canada

Original release
- Network: MuchMusic, XSNetworks
- Release: 1988 – 2013

Fromage is an annual Canadian one-hour special produced by the MuchMusic cable channel. Fromage paid "tribute" to music videos considered the worst or cheesiest of the year by MuchMusic staff.

== History ==
The special was created in 1988 by songwriter (and MuchMusic VJ) Christopher Ward. Christopher hosted the show for the first several years, playing the part of a French stereotype called Charles De Camembert. Later Natalie Richard joined as co-host.

From 1997, the program was hosted by MuchMusic's acerbic puppet VJ Ed the Sock, created and voiced by Steven Joel Kerzner. The show traditionally aired during the Christmas season as a part of special annual programming dubbed the "Holiday Wrap", and features a countdown of the worst music videos of the year, with humorously cynical (and sometimes profane) commentary from Ed along the way. Only selected videos are shown in their entirety. The specials are often taped in places such as cheese factories and restaurants to play on the name "Fromage". "Fromage" is French for "cheese".

The format has changed from year to year; in 1999, rather than looking back at the previous year's videos, the special focused on the worst videos of the 20th century. From then to 2003, the awards were given according to categories nominated in, then counted down from least to most votes. 2001 was the last year the show was seen on MuchMusic USA, after that network decided to end simulcasting MuchMusic and eventually become fuse.

In 2004, the format was changed to a top 40 cheesiest video countdown, where any video can be nominated. This has caused videos to be voted that Ed has not agreed with. These are usually due to the videos being intentionally cheesy, whereas Fromage is supposed to deal with videos that are not aware of their own cheesiness. Such videos included:

- The Darkness—"I Believe in a Thing Called Love" (2004)
- Franz Ferdinand—"Do You Want To" (2005)
- Crazy Frog—"Axel F" (2005)

In December 2006, it was announced that no Fromage special would air on MuchMusic, but a 30-minute special entitled "Ultra Fromage 2006" would air exclusively on Citytv. In order to differentiate itself from the previous Fromage specials, it covered aspects of show business and pop culture, with a short segment on the cheesiest music videos at the end of the program. Ed the Sock maintained hosting duties and was joined by Liana K, his co-host on the Citytv show, Ed & Red's Night Party. This was the last Fromage as Ed's relationship with Citytv ended when new owners re-branded the channel, but the Ultra-Fromage style was a template for what would become I Hate Hollywood on CHCH TV.

In 2008, the MuchMusic program Video on Trial, itself a show that critiques music videos with a rotating panel of comedians, presented the "Best of the Worst 2008" special in December 2008, counting down the worst 20 music videos of the year in a format similar to that of Fromage 2004 and 2005. It was followed up with editions in each subsequent year.

The show was revived after an eight-year hiatus with "Fromage 2013" (albeit with a shorter run-time similar to "Ultra Fromage 2006"), which is featured on the XSNetwork's channel on YouTube. It was once again hosted by Ed the Sock and counted down the nine cheesiest videos of the year, as chosen by Ed personally (as opposed to being chosen by viewers in previous years). It was originally intended to be a one-hour special, like previous Fromage specials, but production was cut due to a power outage caused by the Toronto Ice Storm in late December 2013.

== Dates ==
Title	Date	Host(s)	Station
Fromage '88	30 December 1988	Charles De Camembert (played by Christopher Ward)	MuchMusic
Fromage '89	27 December 1989	Charles De Camembert	MuchMusic
Fromage '90	2 January 1991	Charles De Camembert	MuchMusic
Fromage '91	28 December 1991	Charles De Camembert	MuchMusic
Fromage '92	29 December 1992	Charles De Camembert & Natalie Richard	MuchMusic
Fromage '93	27 December 1993	Charles De Camembert & Natalie Richard	MuchMusic
Fromage '94	24 December 1994	Charles De Camembert & Natalie Richard	MuchMusic
Fromage '95	27 December 1995	Charles De Camembert	MuchMusic
Fromage '96	27 December 1996	Charles De Camembert	MuchMusic
Fromage '97	30 December 1997	Ed The Sock	MuchMusic
Fromage '98	29 December 1998	Ed The Sock	MuchMusic
Fromage 1999	28 December 1999	Ed The Sock	MuchMusic
Fromage 2000: F2K Enter The Cheese	27 December 2000	Ed The Sock	MuchMusic
Fromage 2001	27 December 2001	Ed The Sock	MuchMusic
Fromage 2002	28 December 2002	Ed The Sock	MuchMusic
Fromage 2003	21 December 2003	Ed The Sock	MuchMusic
Fromage '04	25 December 2004	Ed The Sock	MuchMusic
Fromage 2005	22 December 2005	Ed The Sock	MuchMusic
Ultra Fromage 2006	29 December 2006	Ed The Sock	CityTV
Ed the Sock's Fromage 2013	1 January 2014	Ed The Sock	XSNetwork

== Fromage number ones ==
- 1993: "Rock 'Em Sock 'Em Techno" by BKS featuring Don Cherry
- 1994: "Cotton-Eye Joe" by Rednex
- 1995: "This Cowboy Song" by Sting
- 1997: "Electric Barbarella" by Duran Duran
- 1998: "Do for Love" by Tupac Shakur
- 1999: "Just the Way I Planned It" by Philip Michael Thomas (voted cheesiest video of 20th century)
- 2000: "The Hampsterdance Song" credited to "Hampton the Hampster"
- 2001: "Not Too Young, Not Too Old" by Aaron Carter
- 2002: "Papa Don't Preach" by Kelly Osbourne
- 2003: "Me Against the Music" by Britney Spears featuring Madonna
- 2004: "My Prerogative" by Britney Spears
- 2005: "Do Somethin'" by Britney Spears
- 2006: "Lose Control" by Kevin Federline
- 2013: "Bound 2" by Kanye West

== See also ==
- Video on Trial, a MuchMusic series featuring comedic reviews of music videos that ran from 2005 to 2014.
