= Steven Joel Kerzner =

Canadian media personality

- Born: August 25, 1970 (age 56); Toronto, Ontario, Canada
- Other name: Ed the Sock
- Occupations: Actor, producer, television personality
- Years active: 1987–present
- Known for: Ed the Sock
- Spouse: Liana Kerzner (m. 1999)

Steven Joel Kerzner is a Canadian actor, producer, television and radio personality best known for his portrayal of Ed the Sock, originally appearing on CityTV and MuchMusic (until its decline in 2013). Kernzer has continued to portray the character through his own media initiatives FU Network and NewMusicNation.

Since 2023, Kerzner has hosted The All Night Show with Ed the Sock, a nightly live overnight show on Durham Radio 94.9 The Rock.

== Career ==
As a teenager in 1984 Kerzner began volunteering through a student co-op program at Newton Cable, a small local station in Downsview, Ontario. It was at the station that Kernzer developed the Ed the Sock character. Requiring a co-host on short notice, so Kerzner took a sock and other supplies from the station's craft closet and made a sock puppet with glue caps for eyes. He named the puppet Ed after Ed Asner and co-hosted the segment himself. By 1987 Kerzner became a producer and director of programming.

Kerzner later moved the character to CityTV and MuchMusic.

Following the decline of MuchMusic in 2013, due to an acquisition by Bell Media, Kerzner has made a number of attempts to bring the character back through the use of online media. In 2016, he announced the FU Network and in 2021 created the NewMusicNation brand, raising funds for creating an online version of what MuchMusic used to be like.

=== Radio ===
Kerzner has hosted The All Night Show with Ed the Sock overnight five times a week on 94.9 The Rock (Oshawa, Ontario) since 2023. He also co-hosts Ed & Red weekly on CKNT 960 AM Mississauga with Liana Kerzner, since 2020. From 2008 to 2010, they hosted a call-in show, Steven & Liana, Sunday nights on CFRB. In 2022, he teamed with Rick the Temp for a series of regular appearances on Z103.5's morning show.

== Filmography ==
=== TV ===
| Year | Title | Role | Notes |
|---|---|---|---|
| 1987-1994 | The Late Late Show | Ed the Sock | Community access cable, producer and co-host |
| 1995-2008 | Ed's Night Party (later Ed and Red's Night Party) | Ed the Sock | producer and host |
| 1997-2013 | Fromage | Ed the Sock | writer and host |
| 1996 | The Best of Ed's Night Party | Ed the Sock | producer and co-host |
| 1998 | First Time Out | | director |
| 2000 | Ed's Big Wham Bam | Ed the Sock | producer and co-host |
| 2000 | Royal Canadian Air Farce | Ed the Sock | guest |
| 2001 | Spacebar | Ed the Sock | guest |
| 2005-2008 | Ed's Nite In | Ed the Sock | producer and co-host |
| 2006 | The Morgan Waters Show | Ed the Sock | guest |
| 2010 | This Movie Sucks! | Ed the Sock | producer and co-host |
| 2012-2013 | George Stroumboulopoulos Tonight | Ed the Sock | panelist |
| 2012 | I Hate Hollywood | Ed the Sock | producer and co-host |
| 2013 | Video on Trial | Ed the Sock | panelist |

=== Film ===
Kerzner appeared as Ed the Sock in the 2018 film The Joke Thief.

== Politics ==
Kerzner ran in the 1990 Ontario general election in the riding of Wilson Heights for Mike Harris' Progressive Conservative Party of Ontario, but finished third to the Liberal and NDP candidates.

Results of 1990 Ontario provincial election for the riding of Wilson Heights:

1990 Ontario general election
| Party | Candidate | Votes | % |
|---|---|---|---|
| Liberal | Monte Kwinter | 12,272 | 44.4 |
| New Democratic | John Fagan | 9,618 | 34.8 |
| Progressive Conservative | Steven Joel Kerzner | 4,913 | 17.7 |
| Other | | 922 | 3.3 |
| Total votes | | 27,725 | 100.0 |

In his youth Kerzner was a fiscal and foreign-policy conservative, and his political heroes were Margaret Thatcher, Ronald Reagan, Harris and Brian Mulroney. Since the mid-2000s he has offered more left-of center views, stating in a 2009 interview that he is "no longer a conservative". In recent years, he has vigorously defended Liberal Justin Trudeau, particularly in the wake of the SNC-Lavalin scandal.

In a 2012 interview in which he spoke in favor of the legalization of marijuana, Kerzner stated that the war on drugs was an impossible mistake and said vices such as liquor, gambling and smoking are only taxed because "they make us feel good".

== Personal life ==
Kerzner married Liana Kerzner in 1999.
