= Ed Fury =

American bodybuilder, actor, and model (1928–2023)

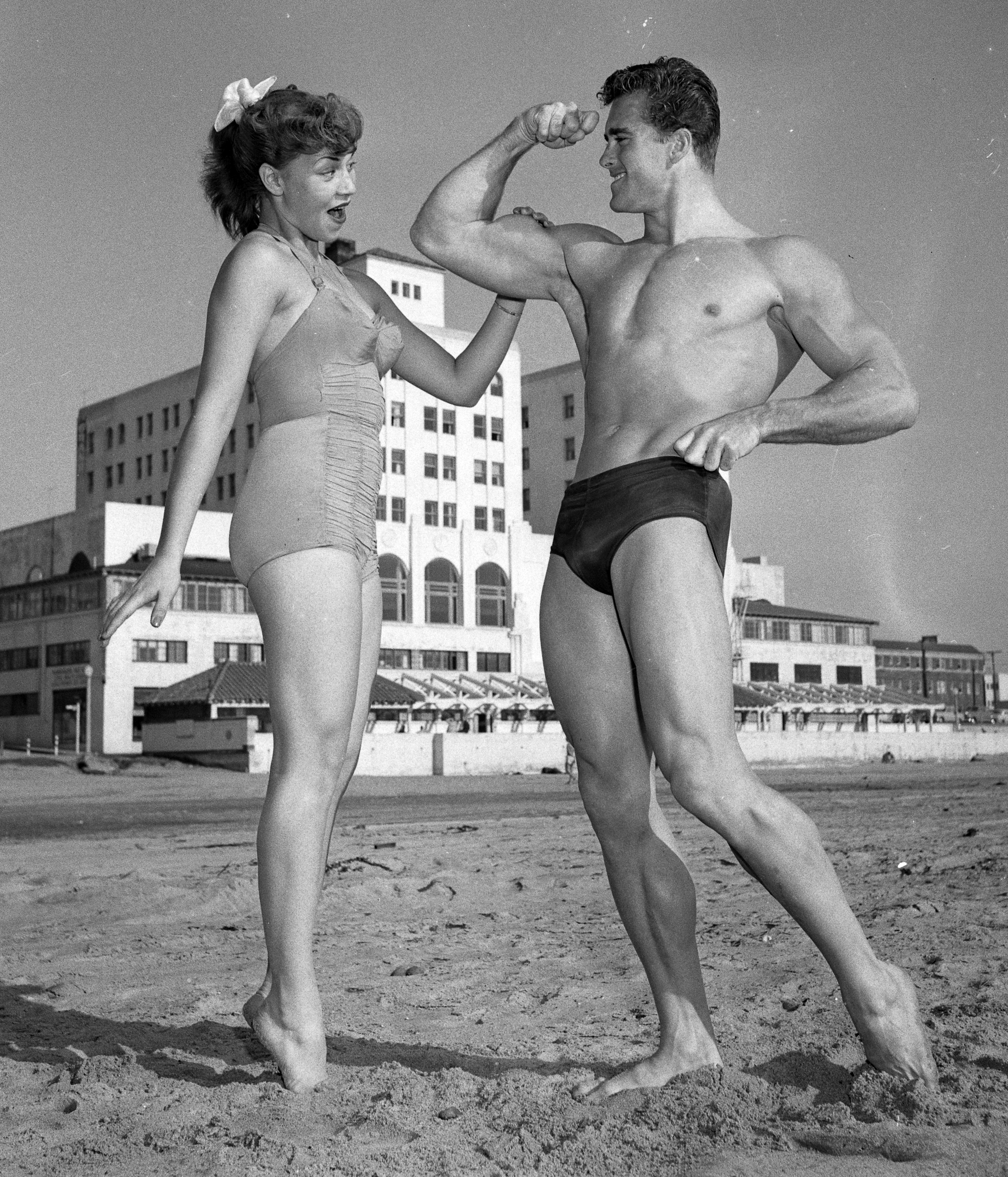
- Fury with model Jackie Coey in 1953
- Born: Rupert Edmund Holovchik; June 6, 1928; Long Island, New York, U.S.
- Died: February 24, 2023 (aged 94); Los Angeles, California, U.S.
- Occupations: Bodybuilder, actor, model
- Years active: 1946–1996
- Height: 6 ft 0 in (1.83 m)
- Spouse: Shelly

Ed Fury (born Rupert Edmund Holovchik; June 6, 1928 – February 24, 2023) was an American bodybuilder, actor, and model. He is best known for starring in a number of "sword-and-sandal" films in the 1950s and 1960s. Fury returned to acting in the early 1970s and appeared mostly in small parts in television series.

== Early life and career ==
Rupert Edmund Holovchik was born on Long Island, New York, on June 6, 1928. An orphan, he moved to Los Angeles, California, in the late 1940s and competed in numerous bodybuilding competitions, such as "Mr. Muscle Beach" in 1951 and 1953, coming in third and second respectively. In addition, he worked as a physique model for photographers Bob Mizer and Bruce Bellas, and also made a couple of loops for Mizer's male erotica studio Athletic Model Guild (AMG). Fury began his acting career as a stage actor. He appeared in a handful of uncredited parts in films, including as an Olympic team member in Gentleman Prefer Blondes, notable because instead of diving into the pool over star Jane Russell, his foot hit her and she fell into the pool as he dived over her. The accident was kept in the final version of the movie. He received his first bigger role in The Wild Women of Wongo (1958).

In 1958, Fury portrayed an Olympic hero in the television series Naked City. After this appearance, Fury found himself out of work for some time. He was arrested in October after being accused of stealing 50 spark plugs from Macy's and using them to assault a store detective who had pursued him after he left the store.

In the 1960s, Fury travelled to Italy and took advantage of the popularity of "sword-and-sandal" films. Led by Steve Reeves, who starred in Hercules (1958), the popularity of those films allowed Fury to star in films such as Colossus and the Amazon Queen (1960), The Seven Revenges (1961), and Maciste Against the Sheik (1962). He also starred as Ursus in the film trilogy Ursus (1961), Ursus in the Valley of the Lions (1961), and Ursus in the Land of Fire (1963), before the popularity of "sword-and-sandal" films waned.

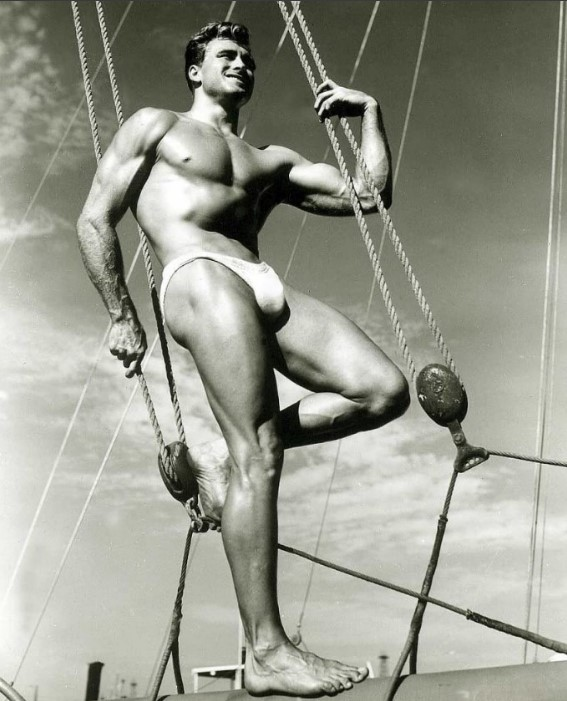

== Later life and death ==
Fury avoided the limelight in later years, but made several public appearances. On September 3, 2001, Fury was honored at Venice Beach by City of Los Angeles Department of Recreation and Parks as part of that year's Labor Day celebrations. The ceremony for local bodybuilders who had made a mark on the film industry was also attended by Gordon Mitchell, Mark Forest, Mickey Hargitay, Brad Harris, Richard Harrison, Reg Lewis and Peter Lupus. Hargitay, Mitchell and Fury again appeared together at the "Swords & Sandals" festival, hosted by the UCLA Film and Television Archive in July 2003.

Fury died at his home in the Woodland Hills neighborhood of Los Angeles on February 24, 2023, at the age of 94. He was survived by his wife, Shelly.

== Selected filmography ==
- Raw Edge (1956)
- The Wild Women of Wongo (1958)
- Colossus and the Amazon Queen (1960)
- Ursus (1961)
- The Seven Revenges (1961)
- Ursus in the Valley of the Lions (1961)
- Maciste against the Sheik (1962)
- Ursus in the Land of Fire (1963)
