= The Wild Women of Wongo =

1958 film

- DVD cover
- Directed by: James L. Wolcott
- Written by: Cedric Rutherford
- Produced by: George R. Black (producer); James L. Wolcott (executive producer)
- Starring: Jean Hawkshaw; Mary Ann Webb; Cande Gerrard; Adrienne Bourbeau
- Cinematography: Harry Walsh
- Edited by: David J. Cazalet
- Production companies: Jaywall Productions; Tropical Pictures; Wolcott Productions
- Distributed by: Bentley Films
- Release date: 1958
- Running time: 71 minutes
- Country: United States
- Language: English

The Wild Women of Wongo is a 1958 American adventure film directed by James L. Wolcott and starring Jean Hawkshaw, Mary Ann Webb, Cande Gerrard, and Adrienne Bourbeau. The low-budget film features stereotypical portrayals of fictional tropical islanders.

== Plot summary ==
The film starts with narration from Mother Nature, discussing an experiment with Father Time that went wrong. On the (fictional) island of Wongo she created a tribe where the men are brutish and ugly and the women are beautiful. She then creates a tribe on a nearby island called Goona where the women are repulsive and the men are strong and handsome. For years the two tribes lived unaware of each other's existence, until ape men from across the ocean attack the village of Goona.

The tribe sends their king's son to seek help against the invaders. The son finds the island of Wongo, the day before the village men pick their brides. The women, seeing the handsome prince, begin questioning their life among the brutes that dwell in the village. The men grow jealous of their visitor and plot to kill him. The women of Wongo, finding out about this, risk their lives to protect the prince, and in doing so offend the crocodile god of the Wongo people (portrayed by stock footage of a crocodilian and a rubber model).

The women are rounded up by the village men and are sent out into the wilderness until the reptile god has drawn blood for the insult. The women band together, watching each other's backs until the ape men arrive at their village and, after they dispatch the invaders to the god, leave in search for the men that had abandoned the island of Wongo. In Goona, the men have just begun their rite of manhood, in which they go into the jungle, without weapons, for a month. The women of Wongo, coming upon the weaponless men, decide to take advantage of their helplessness and, one by one, claim them in marriage. The film concludes with all the beautiful men and women married, and the ugly men with the ugly women.

== Cast ==
- Jean Hawkshaw as Omoo
- Mary Ann Webb as Mona
- Cande Gerrard as Ahtee
- Adrienne Bourbeau (not to be confused with Adrienne Barbeau) as Wana
- Marie Goodhart, Michelle Lamarck, Joyce Nizzari, Val Phillips and Jo Elaine Wagner as Woman of Wongo
- Pat Crowley, Ray Rotello, Billy Day, Burt Parker, Robert Serrecchia and Whitey Hart as Man of Wongo
- Barbara Lee Babbitt, Bernadette, Elaine Krasher, Lillian Melek, Iris Rautenberg and Roberta Wagner as Woman of Goona
- Johnny Walsh as Engor
- Ed Fury as Gahbo
- Roy Murray, Steve Klisanin, Walter Knoch, Ronald Mankowski, Gerry Roslund, Varden Spencer and Kenneth Vitulli as Man of Goona
- Rex Richards as King of Wongo
- Burt Williams as King of Goona
- Zuni Dyer as Priestess
- Olga Suarez as Spirit of the Priestess

== Production ==
- Some of the stock music in the film was also used in Plan 9 from Outer Space.
- The film was shot at the Coral Castle built by Edward Leedskalnin in Homestead, Florida.

== In other media ==
The film was featured in an episode of Ed the Sock's This Movie Sucks!

The film was featured in the film Screwballs although the Te-Pee theatre sign is misspelled as The Wild Women Of Wango.

The movie was featured in one of the episodes of Elvira's Movie Macabre

In the Video Game "Amazon: Guardians of Eden" "Wild Women of Wongo" is one of the main character's favorite films.

The Wild Women of Wongo was riffed by Mystery Science Theater 3000 successor project The Film Crew in 2007.

The theatrical rock band the Tubes had a song by the same name on their 1983 album Outside Inside. It is a parody of the film.
