= This Movie Sucks! =

Canadian comedy TV show (2010)

- The opening title sequence, featuring Ed the Sock's chant of "This Movie Sucks!"
- Starring: Steven Kerzner; Liana Kerzner; Ron Sparks
- Country of origin: Canada
- No. of seasons: 2
- No. of episodes: 13

Production
- Executive producers: Steven Kerzner; Liana Kerzner; Ron Sparks
- Running time: 120 minutes per episode (one episode at 90 minutes)
- Production company: Kerzner/Mediarts Entertainment

Original release
- Network: CHCH-TV (2010-Present)
- Release: May 28 – November 20, 2010

This Movie Sucks! (sometimes abbreviated as TMS!) is a Canadian comedy television series hosted by Ed the Sock, premiering on May 28, 2010, two years after Ed's Night Party went off the air. The show is similar to another former Ed the Sock series, Ed's Nite In. This Movie Sucks! features his wife and Night Party co-host Liana Kerzner, and comedian Ron Sparks, another MuchMusic personality. The series was produced and broadcast by CHCH-TV Hamilton, and also broadcast regionally on CJNT-TV Montreal and CHEK-TV Victoria, as well as on cable stations Movieola and Silver Screen Classics.

A third season of This Movie Sucks! was reported as being under development. It was to feature six new one-hour episodes, as the cast stated that the original two-hour format was "killing" them. Reruns ceased on CHCH-TV until that time, although they still played on other channels. New films to be featured in season three would have included Raiders of Lost Atlantis and The Wild Weng, a film that like the previously featured The Impossible Kid starred Filipino little person actor Weng Weng. The third season either never went into production or simply never aired and CHCH has since removed the show from its listings.

== Premise ==
In each two-hour episode Ed, Liana, Ron and sometimes other guests would watch (and make fun of) a bad movie in Ed's apartment. The movies are often edited for time and also to include humorous sound or film effects or to point out significant details. Examples of this include an often used joke of speeding up certain boring sections of a film and playing them with the addition of a music track. Sometimes things other than the main movie are also featured, such as an episode of DoDo, The Kid from Outer Space which broke up the screening of The Manster.

When not making fun of the movie, the cast also engage in humorous interludes, including such notables as Ron's telling of the stories of "Roninja" and "Lake Erie Pete" and Liana's building of her own island hut. One episode even revolved around Ed hosting a fake telethon to help alleviate the network's "Cheap Bastard Disorder". Occasionally the cast also wander away from their studio to attend events such as Anime North or a different studio where Liana gets filmed in a giantess video. The show is filmed in a deliberately low-budget manner, and much of the work behind the scenes is even done by student volunteers, some of whom are shown on camera. Similarities have been noted between the series and Mystery Science Theater 3000 and also The All-Night Show.

== Characters ==
The original hosts of This Movie Sucks! as seen in the first episode

=== Main cast ===
- Ed the Sock is a puppet, created and voiced by Steven Kerzner. Ed has a scowl, a cigar sticking out of his mouth and a rough, gravelly voice. The show is alleged to be set in his apartment or basement, although as Ed himself has noted, everyone knows they are in fact shooting everything in a studio.
- Liana Kerzner (stage name Liana K) is Ed's co-host, and is actually the wife of Steven Kerzner. Unlike the other characters, she was never referred to as a guest, likely due to her previous role as co-host on Ed & Red's Night Party.
- Ron Sparks is a comedian who has appeared in almost every episode alongside Ed and Liana, and in voice-overs during the movies. He sits behind the couch, usually alone at Ed's bar accompanied by a drink, and is known for making off the wall comments and frequently saying "I'm Ron Sparks". In one episode in which he was unable to attend, the rest of the cast try to find him an understudy, with Max Brand eventually earning the coveted title after introducing himself by loudly announcing "I'm Ron Sparks, but I'm colored!".

=== Recurring characters ===
- Andrew Young is a writer on the show who has been in several episodes. Andrew dressed up in a starfish alien costume at Anime North even though he didn't want to because Ed insisted. Ed has also gotten Andrew to dress up as a two headed monster and a mummy, with Andrew frequently yelling at Ed that he hates doing it. Andrew is an internet radio host for Geek Hard Radio and a filmmaker. Ed broadcasts one of Andrew's short films at the end of the third episode after Andrew agrees to dress up in costume, or at least find someone else to do it for him. In another episode he auditions to be Ron's understudy, but he loses to Max Brand.
- Larissa Drobot is a student intern who often helps out with projects in the show. In The Manster episode Liana did special effects make-up on Larissa's face. In the Wild Women of Wongo episode she shared a story. In the fake telethon episode, she tried to have her birds do some tricks.
- Amusing Duck is a cheap foreign import toy which the cast found in a novelty shop. First introduced in The Manster episode, the duck is capable of excreting plastic eggs out of a plastic flap representing the bird's buttocks, with the toy's box stating in broken English "Lay egg is true!". It later appears after the showing of The Killer Shrews, after it bashes through the wall in parody of several scenes in the movie, although it was quite clearly pushed through by Andrew Young.
- Naked Dave is a friend of Liana's who likes to take off his shirt for no reason, which Ed hates. He is very proud and protective of his sports car (to the point where he kills Steve the intern after Steve threatens to egg the car). Naked Dave was a guest in the episode The Master, but at the end of the episode he is killed by Roninja. He does, however, appear later during the fake telethon to fight "Cheap Bastard Disorder".
- Bandito appears during the Mexican movies double feature special, after Ed invites Mexican wrestler Bandito on the show as a guest because he is the closest guest he has to a real Mexican person. Despite being a luchador, his only piece of costuming is his wrestling mask so Ed makes fun of his T-shirt and shorts. The first movie features The Robot vs. The Aztec Mummy, so Liana dresses him up in a robot costume. Ed later sends him to the most dangerous neighbourhood in Hamilton to pick up some Mexican food. He is then attacked and possibly killed by Lake Erie Pete after Andrew Young is supposed to fight him dressed as the mummy but leaves. He is also later seen in the fake telethon episode, manning the phones.
- Max Brand was a frequent guest on Ed's old show. He appears in the telethon episode as a dancer who also works answering phones on the phone bank. In another episode he returns to audition to be Ron's understudy and wins the part.

=== Other characters ===
- Charlene Zacks was a regular on Ed's old show who Ed always puts down. They frequently pass insults back and forth with Ed coming out on top. She was a guest in the premiere Gorilla episode of TMS! but has not been back since.
- Steve is another intern who enjoys eating bags of potato chips. He is killed by Naked Dave the zombie after threatening to egg his car, as instructed by Ed. Steve never talks.
- Emily Schooley is shown in the fake telethon episode, where she plays a phone operator coerced into helping Ed and Liana out. She sometimes works behind the scenes as well - in the Roninja episode, she did Naked Dave's makeup as well as working as set continuity/PA. In real life she is an actor and improviser.
- Roninja is featured in the episode featuring The Master (about an American Second World War veteran who was trained by the ninja). Ron Sparks tells the legend of the Roninja, a half Ronin/half Ninja who became a crime fighter after his parents were killed by "the Yakuza gang". After the story Sparks suddenly disappears making it appear very possible that he is in fact himself the Roninja. Ed keeps saying that the Roninja isn't real, but Liana points out there is a Roninja page on Wikipedia. It is obviously Sparks playing the Roninja (he has Spark's voice and drink), but it is not shown whether he is actually supposed to be the same person. At the end of the episode Roninja kills another guest, Naked Dave.
- Lake Erie Pete is shown in the Mexican movies episode, during the Haunted Swamp feature. Sparks tells the legend of Lake Erie Pete, about a man who becomes a crime-fighting swamp monster after his parents are killed by one. The story is almost exactly the same as the Roninja story from the previous episode. After telling it, Sparks again disappears then Lake Erie Pete shows up in a cheap Creature from the Black Lagoon mask to ambush the Robot after the failed Robot/Mummy fight.
- Crackers the clown appears during the fake telethon episode, during which he plays a song on his accordion and also plays back-up music for other performers to dance to.

== Episodes ==
=== Series overview ===
Season	Episodes	Originally released	
Season	Episodes	First released	Last released
1	7	May 28, 2010	August 28, 2010
2	6	September 25, 2010	November 20, 2010

=== Season 1: 2010 ===
No. in season	Title	Original release date
1	"Bride of the Gorilla"	May 28, 2010
Ed and friends discuss and screen the 1951 film Bride of the Gorilla starring Raymond Burr and Lon Chaney Jr. The 90-minute version was re-cut after the first airing with voice-overs added and deleted scenes put back into the movie. New 120-minute version aired on June 25, 2010.
2	"Attack from Space"	June 4, 2010
Ed attends an anime festival and screens the 1965 film Attack from Space. Re-edited after the first airing to include more Anime North footage, such as an interview with Ed's friend Fingers. New version aired on August 21, 2010.
3	"The Wild Women of Wongo"	June 18, 2010
Ed and Liana screen and discuss the 1958 big screen spectacular The Wild Women of Wongo. Ron Sparks makes only a brief appearance to say he refuses to watch the film and knock over Liana's turtle god before leaving. Liana builds a hut.
4	"Wild Guitar"	July 9, 2010
A guy with a massive head tries for rock n'roll fame in Wild Guitar. Ed and Liana replay old footage from a previous Ed the Sock series featuring several celebrity appearances, including Will Sasso of Mad TV fame, with Ed breaking into his house and annoying him.
5	"The Manster"	July 24, 2010
Ed and friends lampoon the 1959 classic The Manster. To the delight of Ed, Liana and Ron, Andrew Young wears a second paper mache head. This episode also features a Dodo, the Kid from Outer Space cartoon.
6	"Double Feature of The Killer Shrews and The Snake, the Tiger, the Crane"	July 31, 2010
Ed and friends screen and lampoon their first double feature: The Killer Shrews and The Snake, The Tiger, The Crane.
7	"Geek-o-rama and Cabin Fever"	August 28, 2010
Special Presentation of Geek-o-rama and Ed's Cabin Fever, including footage of Liana at the Electronic Entertainment Expo and old footage from MuchMusic of Ed visiting a contest winner's cottage.

=== Season 2: 2010 ===
No. in season	Title	Original release date
1	"Jesse James Meets Frankenstein's Daughter and The Master"	September 25, 2010
Ed and friends screen Jesse James Meets Frankenstein's Daughter, then Lee Van Cleef rocks it as The Master. Ron Sparks tells the dramatic story of Roninja.
2	"Double-feature of The Robot vs. The Aztec Mummy and The Swamp of the Lost Monsters"	October 2, 2010
It's Mexican Night! Arriba! A K. Gordon Murray double-feature of The Robot vs. The Aztec Mummy and The Swamp of the Lost Monsters. Ron Sparks tells the story of Lake Erie Pete and Bandito returns as the robot to fight Andrew Young, who wraps himself up in toilet paper to become a mummy.
3	"Laser Mission"	October 16, 2010
The first-ever telethon to raise money to fight "Cheap Bastard Disorder", a malady that affects Canadian television executives. Also, a modern classic movie: Laser Mission, starring Brandon Lee and Oscar winner Ernest Borgnine.
4	"Double Feature of Manos: The Hands of Fate and The Impossible Kid"	October 30, 2010
The ultra low-budget Manos: The Hands of Fate and the spy movie The Impossible Kid, starring Cabbage Patch Kid-sized action hero Weng Weng. Plus, the Ron Sparks video re-mix as Ed auditions people for the coveted role of Ron's understudy, with Max Brand ("I'm Ron Sparks but I'm coloured") winning.
5	"Yongary, Monster from the Deep"	November 13, 2010
Giant monster mania with the legendary Korean film Yongary, Monster from the Deep, plus Liana becoming the 500-foot tall scourge of Spronksville as we watch the making of a Giantess video! Ron Sparks is present only in voice-over, apparently confused that he's not supposed to be in this episode.
6	"Prisoners of the Lost Universe"	November 20, 2010
Ed and friends screen Prisoners of the Lost Universe, starring Richard Hatch of Battlestar Galactica fame. Featuring a "sighting" of Seal.

== Reception ==
This Movie Sucks! initially garnered a lukewarm reception, with many criticizing Ed's "bad movie" selection and the production values, which were weaker than in previous Ed the Sock efforts. Technical issues with both video and audio were a regular occurrence in the first few episodes, owing largely to Ed's heavy reliance on student interns for crew. It has also been consistently criticized for somewhat disorganized scheduling though it is unknown if that is more the show's fault or the network's.

As time went on the show improved however, and reviews and audience feedback were mostly positive, with the show going on hiatus from July 31 to September 25 in part to iron out these issues. In this time only one new show was broadcast which was a mishmash of old and new footage quite different from the rest of the series.

After eliminating the technical issues and committing to a regular weekly schedule, the series had been "pretty much been bashed into shape" with much credit being given to Ed's improved movie selection (including Manos "by fan request") and to the cast finding "their stride" with their jabs during the movie, with Sparks' comedy getting particular praise.

A SquidWho poll found that 32% watched for Sparks, 29% for Ed the Sock and the rest watched for Liana or "other" reasons, with 15% of replies saying they do not watch the show. The page also featured a manipulated picture of Ed the Sock smoking his trademark cigar while a film reel unspooled around him with 70% of voters replying "yes" to the question "should this be This Movie Sucks new logo?" A number of replies to the poll seemed to indicate that many of those voting "other" watched the show for the bad movies themselves. It was also named one of the five best TV shows of 2010 by Toronto Entertainment and one of the three best new shows of 2010 by Excalibur Magazine.

=== Awards ===
The series won the 2011 Canadian Comedy Award for Best TV Show.
