= Cynthia Cypert =

American actress and stunt performer

- Born: United States
- Occupation: Actress

Cynthia Cypert is an American actress and stunt performer best known for such films and television series as T. J. Hooker, Patriot Games, The Sting II, The Master and Matt Houston.
