= Rob Hawke =

Canadian comedic and dramatic actor

Rob Hawke is a Canadian actor and Gemini Award-nominated writer. He has performed his one-man show, Norm versus Cancer: A Terminally Funny One Man Show, which is based on his personal experience of surviving thyroid cancer. Hawke is an alumnus of The Second City, performing across Canada and internationally in the Second City National Touring Company.

== Career ==
Hawke was a 2011 Canadian Comedy Award Nominee for his work on "Norm Vs Cancer: A Terminally Funny One Man Show", and has shared in a Canadian Comedy Award for the fully improvised musical Showstopping Number. He shared in a Gemini nomination for his work on SketchCom for CBC, as well as a co-recipient of the 1997 Tim Sims Encouragement Fund Award. Hawke is also a member of the musical comedy duo, Fast and Dirty.

Hawke has written two books, Kicking Cancer's Ass: A Light-Hearted Guide to the Fight of Your Life and Vampire Dogs: The Rise of Thrasher.

== Filmography ==
=== Film ===
Year	Title	Role	Notes
1989	Freakshow	Paramedic #2	
2012	Covenant	Matthews	

=== Television ===
Year	Title	Role	Notes
1990	Degrassi High	AIDS Speaker #1	Episode: "Bad Blood: Part 2"
1998–1999	SketchCom	Various	3 episodes
1999	Total Recall 2070	Vidcom Guy 2	Episode: "Bones Beneath My Skin"
