= Tim Sims =

Canadian actor and comedian (1962–1995)

- Born: Timothy Sims; 1962; Canada
- Died: February 2, 1995 (aged 32–33); Toronto, Ontario, Canada
- Occupations: Actor, comedian
- Years active: 1983–1995

Tim Sims (1962 – February 2, 1995) was a Canadian actor and comedian.

He is known for his roles as Jack the Cave Man on The Red Green Show and as Circle Researcher Rory Tate in a series of Reese's Peanut Butter Cup commercials in the 1990s. He also performed sketch comedy with The Second City.

Sims died at the age of 33 from AIDS-related causes. The Tim Sims Encouragement Fund Award and Tim Sims Playhouse, a Toronto venue used by The Second City, are both named in his honour.

== Tim Sims Encouragement Fund Award ==
The Tim Sims Encouragement Fund Award is an annual award given to Canada's "most promising new comedy act". It was established by Sims' widow, comic actor Lindsay Leese. From 1996 to 2015, the Award is given annually as part of the Cream of Comedy showcase at The Second City, which features performances by that year's five finalists and which was televised by The Comedy Network until the final few years. In 2015, the 20th and final Cream of Comedy showcase (CoC20) took place at Toronto's Second City, featuring performances by many previous winners and nominees.

Since 2016 two Tim Sims Awards have been given out annually, one to a Second City Training Centre Conservatory Program Graduate, and another to a student of the Comedy Writing and Performance Program at Humber College.

=== Winners ===
==== 1996-2015 ====
- 1996 - Jason Thompson: "Horror Clown"
- 1997 - Fast & Dirty (Gord Oxley & Rob Hawke)
- 1998 - Gavin Crawford
- 1999 - Fraser Young
- 2000 - Laurie Elliot
- 2001 - Levi MacDougall
- 2002* - Brad Hart & Tim Polley
- 2003 - Ron Sparks
- 2004 - Katie Crown
- 2005 - Jeff McEnery
- 2006 - Nathan Fielder
- 2007 - Nathan Macintosh
- 2008 - 7 Minutes in Heaven (Josh Saltzman & Laura Cilevitz)
- 2009 - Calvin Storoschuk
- 2010 - Mike Rita
- 2011 - British Teeth (Filip Jeremic & Allana Reoch)
- 2012 - Christi Olson
- 2013 - Nigel Grinstead
- 2014 - Caitlin Langelier

*in 2002 Hart and Polley tied for the award after the jury became hopelessly deadlocked; a new rule was made that Lindsay Leese would receive a tie-break in future years, if necessary, to avoid the same problem.

==== 2015-present ====
Humber College Comedy Program students

- 2015 - Meg MacKay
- 2016 - Robbie Woods
- 2017 - Jordanne Brown
- 2018 - Glenys Marshall
- 2019 - Bria Hiebert
- 2020 - Nate Friedman
- 2021 - Cassandra DeStellis
- 2022 - Katie Chin
- 2023 - Sarah Boston
- 2024 - Brady Coyle
- 2025 - Verne Bird
- 2026 - Arnab Sen

===== Second City Training Centre Conservatory Program graduates =====
- 2015 - Carolina Zoccoli
- 2016 - Cameron LaPrairie
- 2017 - Tom Hearn
- 2018 - Ophira Calof
- 2019 - Cihang Ma
