= Craig Campbell (comedian) =

Canadian stand-up comedian

Craig Campbell (born 1969) is a Canadian stand-up comedian, who now lives in Devon, England.

== Career ==
Campbell co-hosted Ed's Night Party (aka Ed's Late Night) with Ed the Sock on Citytv in Toronto, Canada for several seasons, and also hosted From Wimps to Warriors. He was also part of a comedy trio called The Dinks, with Tony Law and Dan Antopolski. He also appeared with Dennis Miller on Mountain Madness and performed with Jim Carrey Live and on Just for Laughs. In the UK he has appeared on Russell Howard's Good News on BBC Three and with Al Murray on Edinburgh & Beyond. He also appeared in the second series of Michael McIntyre's Comedy Roadshow on BBC One. In November 2008 he toured Kazakhstan with UK comic Nick Wilty, performing in Almaty, Aktau and Atyrau. He supported Frankie Boyle on his 2010 UK tour and performed his debut stand-up tour in 2011. He opened for Boyle on his 2012 tour. He appeared on Dave's One Night Stand in April 2011, with Chris Addison and Jo Enright. In November 2015, Craig performed in Moscow, Russia. Campbell hosted a monthly comedy night in Tiverton, Devon. However, due to the Coronavirus pandemic, this has been cancelled.

== DVDs ==
- Death of a Badger (2010)
