= DoDo, The Kid from Outer Space =

British TV animated sci-fi series (1965–1970)

- Genre: Science Fiction
- Created by: Lady Stearn Robinson
- Composer: John Gregory
- Country of origin: United Kingdom
- No. of episodes: 78

Production
- Executive producer: Halas and Batchelor
- Running time: 5 minutes
- Production companies: Halas and Batchelor

Original release
- Release: September 24, 1965 – March 7, 1970

DoDo, The Kid from Outer Space is a science fiction animated television series that was syndicated to television from September 24, 1965 to March 7, 1970. The series follows DoDo, a young humanoid extraterrestrial from the planet Hena Hydro, who has come to Earth in his flying saucer, and has numerous adventures. The shorts are often based on scientific and technological advances of the period, most notably the development of computers and space exploration.

== Overview ==
DoDo is a young humanoid extraterrestrial from the planet Hena Hydro, who comes to Earth in his flying saucer, and has numerous adventures. For the most part, DoDo resembles an Earth child, but has antennas on his large, pointed ears and propellers on his heels that allow him to fly. On Earth, DoDo shares living quarters with Professor Fingers, an eccentric scientist. Other characters include Compy the Computer Bird (DoDo's computer/duck hybrid friend), and How and his younger sister Why, two Earth children. The characters often speak in rhymed couplets, either independently or playing off each other. A (non-rhyming) narrator accompanies each episode.

== Production ==
DoDo was created by Lady Stearn Robinson and produced by British animators Halas and Batchelor. A total of 78 five-minute episodes were produced.

== Episodes ==
1. Ancient Idol
2. The Astrognome
3. Bully Adventure
4. The Christmas Adventure
5. The Day the Earth Was Sold
6. Diamond Thieves
7. Discovery of Fingegillian
8. DoDo and Compy Dance Out of Trouble
9. DoDo and Compy in Hollywood
10. DoDo and the Astronaut
11. DoDo and the Easter Bell
12. DoDo and the Magic Magnet
13. DoDo and the Space Pirates
14. DoDo and the Touchies
15. DoDo and the Transatlantic Cable
16. DoDo at the Ballet
17. DoDo at the Fair
18. DoDo at the Opera
19. DoDo at the Rodeo
20. DoDo at the Scout Jamboree
21. DoDo at the Sky Hotel
22. DoDo Buys a Space Pig
23. DoDo Directs the First Space Ball Game
24. DoDo Finds the Cat's Tongue
25. DoDo Goes to Aquascot
26. DoDo Goes to Paris
27. DoDo Goes West
28. DoDo Helps Interpol
29. DoDo in a Garage Adventure
30. DoDo in a Real Good Skate
31. DoDo in a Ski Adventure
32. DoDo in Japan
33. DoDo in Pukcab Land
34. DoDo Joins the Circus
35. DoDo Meets a Bustling Busker
36. DoDo Meets the Abominable Snowman
37. DoDo Paints a House
38. DoDo Sees Compy Happen
39. DoDo the Circus Star
40. DoDo Visits the Moon
41. DoDo's Arrival
42. The Dodon Discovery
43. Early Bird Catch
44. The Elephant Valley
45. The Fishing Fleet
46. Forty Winks Machine
47. Haunted House
48. Hi-Jacked Plane
49. High Prospecting
50. Horsing Around
51. Hurdy Gurdy Man
52. Innocent Bulb Napper
53. The Kidnapped Kid
54. License Trouble
55. The Lighthouse
56. Loch Ness Monster
57. Magic Magnet Goes Wild
58. The Magic Magnet Saves Some Money
59. The Microfilm Spies
60. Moon Mice
61. Music of the Spheres
62. Mystery Fire
63. Professor Fingers Builds a Bridge
64. The Purloined Picture
65. Secret of the Pyramid
66. Smellometer
67. Smuggle Puzzle
68. The Stuck Space Shot
69. The Sunken Treasure
70. Supersonic Reporting
71. The Symphony
72. The Tardies
73. Tennis Tournament
74. The Whale of a Party
75. TV Burglars
76. Very Sheepish Affair

== In other media ==
An episode of DoDo, The Kid from Outer Space was shown as part of the Canadian comedy television series This Movie Sucks! in between its showing of the film The Manster. The series was broadcast on Spanish television (channel TVE1 & dubbed in the Spanish language) during the mid-1970s.
