= You Got Trumped: The First 100 Days =

2016 satirical dark comedy TV series

You Got Trumped: The First 100 Days is a short format satirical dark comedy TV and Web series. It was produced during the 2016 presidential election, examining what a hypothetical (at the time) first 100 days in office of President Donald J. Trump might look like. The series stars Ron Sparks as Chris Christie and impressionist John Di Domenico as Trump, with all episodes directed by Derek Harvie. Renaud Le Van Kim and Guillaume Lacroix served as producers on the series, which has been described as "insane" and "comico-dystopian".

The first series produced by French video on demand service Blackpills, co-produced by Miramedia and Together Media, You Got Trumped utilized raunchy humor, with several episodes ultimately age restricted and/or pulled from YouTube following complaints then re-posted in censored versions, including "Trump Juice", in which Trump makes out with his daughter Ivanka and sells his semen on TV, "The Art of the Dull" in which Trump presents China's "Prime Minister" with a self-portrait featuring his exposed "huge American penis", and the trailer.

Blackpills publicized its series both with the tagline "Grabbing America by the Pussy" and a "Make Twitter Great Again" campaign using the hashtag #YouGotTrumped. Blackpills offered $50,000 to anyone who could get the real Donald Trump to use the hashtag in social media (Twitter or Facebook), but apparently no one was able to collect. The series was aimed at young adults with Blackpills gearing their programming toward mobile phone-based subscribers, with very short episodes.

13 episodes were produced, of which 10 were released in October and November 2016 by Blackpills through YouTube and Facebook, to promote the launch of Blackpills, a "mysterious" new France-based streaming service, in 2016. However, although the webisodes were posted on other streaming sites by November 4, 2016, four days before Trump's surprising election win, the launch for Blackpills itself was for unknown reasons pushed back to the end of 2016, and then into 2017. When Blackpills finally launched in May 2017 with You Got Trumped as its first flagship show, it was several months after Trump actually took office.

The series also later aired on Vice TV (including Viceland & Viceland Canada).

== Plot ==
Each episode examined a different aspect of Donald Trump's personality and character, including his purported racism (focusing on his Border Wall and catering to white nationalists), sexism/Misogyny, inappropriate physical attraction toward his own daughter Ivanka, self aggrandizement, love of guns, perceived lack of intelligence and even fawning over Russian President Vladimir Putin (including as an apparent homosexual romantic interest). Every episode also features flashbacks to Donald Trump's childhood, focusing in particular on his relationship with his cruelly abusive father, Fred Trump.

In the series, aside from his lackey Chris Christie, Trump builds an administration by surrounding himself with other questionable choices including Vice President of the United States Mike Pence, a presumed Nazi war criminal named Klaus, his money burning wife Melania Trump and vapid daughter Ivanka Trump, a blonde and bikini-clad Beauty pageant bimbo, Rosie O'Donnell (who he keeps in a cage), a mad scientist, and a monkey named Coco who he makes United States Secretary of Defense and puts in charge of the nuclear football.

== Reception ==
The series was considered a hit, especially in France, and also did very well in Canada. Between Facebook and YouTube, where Blackpills posted the series before election day, the show accumulated more than six million views, but the series failed to make much impact on the Blackpills app because it was "stale" by the time their streaming service finally launched in May 2017, several months after Trump actually won the election and then took office.

Online, You Got Trumped became the target of the wrath of Trump supporters in the US who did not like the "cartoonish" way in which he was presented as a boastful, simple-minded bigot with a romantic interest in Putin, but also from some on the left who thought Hillary Clinton, Barack Obama, Rosie O'Donnell and other liberal characters were presented as much too weak compared to the imposing, domineering Trump.

Critical response was mixed, with some criticizing the show's raunchy humor, while others praised the show's satire and performances despite its "trashiness". Di Domenico and Sparks especially were singled out for praise for their portrayals of Trump and Chris Christie.

An episode of the French news program Quotidien was dedicated to a discussion of the series, led by host/producer Yann Barthès. Barthes and guest panelists described the show as "very funny" and "unbelievable".

=== Awards ===
You Got Trumped was nominated in every web category at the 2017 Canadian Comedy Awards and nearly swept those awards, winning for Best Web Series, Best Web Performance (Sparks) and Best Web Writing (Derek Harvie, Jeff Kassel and Sparks), but not winning in the Best Web Direction category (Harvie).
