= The Joke Thief =

- Directed by: Frank D'Angelo
- Written by: Frank D'Angelo
- Produced by: Frank D'Angelo
- Starring: Frank D'Angelo
- Cinematography: Ed Hannaford
- Edited by: Robin Gardiner Davids
- Music by: Frank D'Angelo
- Production company: In Your Ear Productions
- Release date: April 16, 2018 (Boston)
- Running time: 81 minutes
- Country: Canada
- Language: English

The Joke Thief is a 2018 Canadian drama film written by, produced by, directed by and starring Frank D'Angelo.

== Plot ==
A stand-up comedian is almost washed-up due to a reputation of joke stealing, a fellow comedian convinces a comedy club owner to give him some stage time and one last shot at redemption.

== Cast ==
- Frank D'Angelo as Simon McCabe
- Sugith Varughese as Jerry the Uber Driver
- Daniel Baldwin as Freddy C.
- John Ashton as Joseph Rogers
- Alyson Court as Margaret Fellows
- Art Hindle as Brian McCabe
- Steven Joel Kerzner as Ed the Sock

== Reception ==
Linda Howard, writing for The Herald, said, "The Joke Thief is littered with stand-out scenes and one-liners that pull you in right from the opening scene and sultry soundtrack, which coincidentally, stars three generations of the D'Angelo family."
