= Ed & Red's Night Party =

- Created by: Steven Joel Kerzner
- Starring: Steven Joel Kerzner; Howard Glassman (1995); Craig Campbell (1996–2004); Liana Kerzner (2004–2008)
- Country of origin: Canada
- No. of seasons: 14

Production
- Running time: approx. 30 minutes (including commercials)

Original release
- Network: Citytv
- Release: February 10, 1995 – August 31, 2008

Ed & Red's Night Party (formerly called Ed's Night Party and sometimes referred to simply as Ed the Sock) is a Canadian late-night talk variety show. It was hosted by Steven Joel Kerzner as Ed the Sock and Kerzner's real-life wife Liana K. Other people who worked on the show included DJ James Stamos and comedian Ron Sparks. To date, it is the longest running Canadian late night talk show in history.

== History ==
The show originated on community access television in Toronto as The Late Late Show from 1987 to 1993 on Newton Cable, in parts of the North York neighbourhoods of Downsview and Willowdale, featuring Ed the Sock as the sidekick for a succession of hosts. The show was created and produced by Kerzner, who also played Ed. When Newton was bought out by Rogers Cable, the show was picked up by Rogers Community Channel 10 across Metropolitan Toronto from 1993 to 1995, hosted by Eric Tunney and then Harland Williams, with Ed as co-host.

It was picked up by Citytv in Toronto becoming Ed's Night Party with Ed as host and Howard Glassman as co-host in 1995. Glassman left in the show's first season and was replaced by Craig Campbell who was co-host until 2004. Kerzner's wife, Liana, co-hosted the final four seasons, for the last of which the show was renamed Ed and Red's Night Party.

The series was syndicated across Canada. Ed's profile was raised even higher with a series of specials and appearances on the national music video channel MuchMusic. The series was taken off the air in Alberta and other parts of the country after the show aired a comedy sequence in which Ed is shown supposedly having sex with a Playboy playmate, even though the program was being broadcast in a late night time slot.

In addition to its run in Canada, the show briefly ran on G4 in the United States as part of their Midnight Spank late night television programming block. The show was also carried on the Ripe TV on-demand service. The show was retired with its final episode airing on CITY-TV on August 31, 2008. In Australia the show was seen on Fuel TV, where it is known as Ed the Sock.

== Legacy ==
After the shows cancellation, both Ed the Sock, Liana Kerzner, and Ron Sparks would later return together on a different show produced by CHCH-TV Hamilton called This Movie Sucks!, where the three pick on bad movies.

== See also ==
- This Movie Sucks!
- Ed's Nite In
