= I Hate Hollywood =

Canadian television series

- Written by: Ed the Sock; Liana Kerzner; Ron Sparks
- Presented by: Ed the Sock; Liana Kerzner
- Country of origin: Canada
- Original language: English

Original release
- Network: CHCH
- Release: May 1, 2012

I Hate Hollywood is a Canadian television series, which premiered on CHCH and in syndication in May 2012. Hosted by Ed the Sock and Liana Kerzner and featuring co-writer Ron Sparks, the series is a satire of entertainment news shows such as Entertainment Tonight. The series was originally slated to premiere in 2010, but was delayed by financial difficulties.
