= Ron Sparks (comedian) =

Canadian comedian (born 1977)

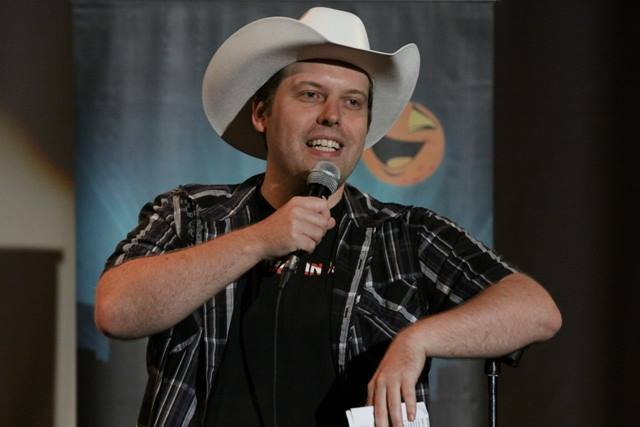
- Ron Sparks performing at the 2013 YYComedy Festival in Calgary.
- Born: May 20, 1977 (age 49); Chatham-Kent, Ontario, Canada
- Website: myspace.com/sparksnation

Ron Sparks (born May 20, 1977) is a Canadian comedian, actor, writer, and producer. He is known as an alternative comedian and frequent guest on CBC Radio's The Debaters, and on TV as a regular and favourite juror on MuchMusic's highest-rated show, Video on Trial, also starring as The Judge in the Stars on Trial Christmas special and various other VOT spin-offs.

== Early life ==
Sparks was born in Chatham-Kent, Ontario.

== Comedy ==
=== Theatre ===
As a student at Chatham-Kent Secondary School Sparks enjoyed doing improv and performing in drama class and at assemblies. His first TV appearance was a televised swearing-in ceremony in which he and a friend did a sketch about a border officer interviewing an immigrant. In 1997 his farce Chuck Sent Me won the Grand Theatre Stage Presence Competition for young playwrights.

At York University his one act plays Richard Keats' Apartment of Doom and Home to Mother both won the Vanier College playwriting competition in 2000 and 2001 while A Thanksgiving That Would Even Make Great Aunt Gladys Proud and My Favourite Aunt also took 2nd and 3rd prize in 1999 and 2001. Apartment of Doom and My Favourite Aunt were both remounted as Toronto Fringe Festival shows.

At York University, Sparks contributed humorous articles and reviews for the student newspaper The Vandoo and was promoted to an editor, but quit after frequent complaints by Vanier College administration led to tighter guidelines.

=== Improv and sketch ===
Sparks first began performing comedy regularly with York University's Vanier Improv Company as a student, where he became a standout and met his sketch troupe mates The Minnesota Wrecking Crew. They would go on to be nominated four straight years (2003–2006) for the Best Sketch Troupe Canadian Comedy Award, winning in 2003 and 2004. In 2006 they won again for Best Taped Live Performance for the CBC special Sketch with Kevin McDonald.

The MWC became the "house troupe" at Second City Toronto's Sketchy at Best showcase, where they would perform sets of mostly new sketches every week.

Sparks was a member of the sketch troupes Rocket 9, Gazebo Pals and the CCA-nominated Shoeless, and has also hosted Comedy Bar's Sunday Night Live more than any other guest.

=== Stand-up ===
After performing on the show with the Wrecking Crew a few times, he began working the door for Toronto's legendary ALTdot COMedy Lounge at the Rivoli in 2002. At show producer Zoe Rabnett's urging he tried performing stand-up in 2003 at The ALTdot COMedy Lounge and went on to win that year's Tim Sims Award, given to Toronto's most promising new comedy act, in just his 20th set. He then also won the 2004 Best Stand-up Newcomer Canadian Comedy Award, becoming the first person to win both.

After his Tim Sims Cream of Comedy showcase, he was invited to write and star in his own series of shorts for The Comedy Network, From the Desk of Ron Sparks, based on real letters he has written since childhood.

Stand-up credits include Just for Laughs as well as the Halifax, Winnipeg, Laughing Gas and YYC Comedy Festivals. He was JFL's Toronto Homegrown Champion in 2007 and has performed in various JFL and JFL-42 shows including Set List, The Alternative Show with Andy Kindler and The Debaters. He has opened for such comedians as Kyle Kinane, Moshe Kasher, Russell Peters, Kevin Pollak, Marc Maron, Janeane Garofalo, Norm Macdonald, Joan Rivers, Brian Posehn, Mike Wilmot, David Cross, Andy Kindler, Tom Green, Doug Stanhope and Todd Barry.

His 2008 CTV Comedy Now! stand-up special won a WorldFest Award and two Canadian Comedy Awards.

When the ALTdot added a second weekly show, the SketchDot COMedy Lounge, Sparks was invited to do a weekly Weekend Update style segment, The News Desk with Ron Sparks.

=== Film & TV ===
On television he starred in MuchMusic's highest rated show Video on Trial and its spin-off, Stars on Trial, also writing for those and other MuchMusic series. He co-wrote and starred as Chris Christie in the series You Got Trumped, for which he won multiple awards. He was also a regular panelist on the Super Channel series Too Much Information and has been a regular on various Ed the Sock series (including co-hosting the cult hit This Movie Sucks!), and T1's The Toronto Show as Ron the Hollywood Reporter and other characters.

Other TV credits include NBC's The Firm, The Beaverton, This Hour Has 22 Minutes, Meet the Family, Straight Man, Clumsy & Shy, Dark Rising: The Savage Tales of Summer Vale, The Jon Dore Television Show, Sox in a Box and The Invasion Report.

Film credits include Medium Raw, Dark Rising, By George, Sweetener and Ham & Cheese.

He is the subject of the book The Essential Actor's Guide: Spotlight on Ron Sparks.

=== Radio ===
Sparks is a regular and favourite guest on CBC Radio's The Debaters (which he also writes for). He has also appeared on Brave New Waves, Definitely Not the Opera and Out Front. He had his own weekly segment The News Desk with Ron Sparks on 102.1 The Edge.

== Filmography ==
Year	Title	Role
2003	The Toronto Show	Ron the Hollywood Correspondent, The Minnesota Wrecking Crew (6 episodes)
2003	Ed's Nite Party	Himself (various episodes)
2003	Cream of Comedy	Nominee/Winner
2004	Ham & Cheese	Comedy Club Patron
2005	From the Desk of Ron Sparks	Ron Sparks (4 episodes)
2005	Ed's Nite In	Park Ranger Ron, Himself
2005	Canadian Comedy Shorts	Various Characters
2005	Stars on Trial	The Judge
2006	The Ha!ifax Comedy Festival	Himself (Stand-up)
2006	Sketch with Kevin McDonald	Various Characters
2006	2006 MuchMusic Video Awards	Presenter
2006	Video on Trial: Holiday Crap	Juror
2006	Video on Trial: 80s Videos Special	Juror
2007	Canadian Comedy Awards: Nice Special	Stand-up
2007	Dark Rising	Soldier
2008	The Jon Dore Television Show	Farting Writer (1 episode)
2008	Comedy Now!	Himself (Stand-up) (1 episode)
2008	Sox in a Box	Beans
2008	Other People's Stuff: Jan & Wayne Skylar from Tim & Eric Awesome Show Great Job!	Dr. Steve Brule
2009	The Newsdesk with Ron Sparks	News Anchor Ron Sparks
2009	Snuff: The Film	Snuff
2009	Medium Raw: Night of the Wolf	Greg
2010	This Movie Sucks!	Co-host
2005-2011	Video on Trial	Himself (42 episodes)
2011	The Debaters: The TV Series	Himself (2 episodes)
2011	The Invasion Report	Blirn! (5 episodes)
2011	The Trial	Mr. Testman
2011	iMobiles	Gary the Penguin (voice)
2011	Dark Rising: The Savage Tales of Summer Vale	Cartright
2011	Flu	Bathrobed Dancer
2012	The Firm	Bailiff (1 episode)
2012	The L.A. Complex	Mental Patient (1 episode)
2012	By George	Alan Ladd III / Chewbacco / Nien Nund
2012	The Train	Alfred
2013	Straight Man	The Doctor (4 episodes)
2010-2014	The Winnipeg Comedy Festival	Himself, Tork the Cave Man (3 episodes)
2014	CLUMSY+shy	CLUMSY (voice)
2014	Flickers!	Various Characters (6 episodes)
2014	Satisfaction	Lawn Tractor Customer (1 episode)
2014-2015	Meet the Family	Various Characters (4 episodes)
2014-2015	Too Much Information	Himself (14 episodes)
2015	Captain Blast!: Adventures in the 2nd Dimension	The Vice President
2016	The Beaverton	Food Scientist (1 episode)
2016	Big Boy's Big Brawl	Big Boy's Rude Assistant
2016	You Got Trumped	Chris Christie (13 episodes)
2017	SmartAssociates	Himself (3 episodes)
2017	Fathers Support Group	Father (12 episodes)
2018-2019	Bajillionaires	Various (4 episodes)
2019	Fake News: A Trump Story	

== Awards and nominations ==
Year	Nominated work	Event	Award	Result
2003	Ron Sparks	Tim Sims Encouragement Fund Award	Tim Sims Award	Won
2003	The Minnesota Wrecking Crew	Canadian Comedy Awards	Best Sketch Troupe	Won
2004	Ron Sparks	Canadian Comedy Awards	Best Stand-up Newcomer	Won
2004	The Minnesota Wrecking Crew	Canadian Comedy Awards	Best Sketch Troupe	Won
2005	The Minnesota Wrecking Crew	Canadian Comedy Awards	Best Sketch Troupe	Nominated
2005	From the Desk of Ron Sparks	Canadian Comedy Awards	Best One Person Show	Won
2006	The Minnesota Wrecking Crew, Sketch with Kevin McDonald	Canadian Comedy Awards	Best Taped Live Performance	Won
2006	The Minnesota Wrecking Crew	Canadian Comedy Awards	Best Sketch Troupe	Nominated
2006	The Newsdesk with Ron Sparks	Canadian Comedy Awards	Best One Person Show	Nominated
2007	Plan LIVE from Outer Space	Canadian Comedy Awards	Best Play	Won
2008	The Newsdesk with Ron Sparks	Canadian Comedy Awards	Best One Person Show	Nominated
2009	Life's A Zoo	Banff Rockie Award	Best Music or Variety Program	Nominated
2009	Ron Sparks, Comedy Now!	Canadian Comedy Awards	Best Taped Live Performance	Won
2009	Ron Sparks, Comedy Now!	Canadian Comedy Awards	Best Writing – TV	Won
2009	Himself, Comedy Now!	Worldfest - Bronze Remi Award	Best TV Special, Comedy	Won
2010	Debaters, Monotheism vs. Polytheism (Ron Sparks vs. Sean Cullen)	Canadian Comedy Awards	Best Radio Program	Won
2011	This Movie Sucks!	Canadian Comedy Awards	Best TV Show	Won
2012	The Trial	Canadian Comedy Awards	Best Film	Nominated
2012	The Trial (Kevin MacDonald & Ron Sparks)	Canadian Comedy Awards	Best Direction – Film	Nominated
2012	The Newsdesk with Ron Sparks	Canadian Comedy Awards	Best One Person Show	Nominated
2012	Ron Sparks	Canadian Comedy Awards	Best Male Stand-up	Won
2012	Ron Sparks' Celebrity Roasts	Canadian Comedy Awards	Best Comedic Play, Revue or Series	Nominated
2012	Debaters, Fast Food is Evil (Alan Park vs. Ron Sparks)	Canadian Comedy Awards	Best Radio Program or Clip	Nominated
2013	The Newsdesk on The Edge 102.1	Canadian Comedy Awards	Best Radio Program or Clip	Nominated
2013	Ron Sparks	Canadian Comedy Awards	Best Male Stand-up	Nominated
2014	This Hour Has 22 Minutes	WGC Awards	Best Television Series – Comedy	Nominated
2014	Ron Sparks	Canadian Comedy Awards	Best Male Stand-up	Nominated
2014	Meet the Family	Canadian Comedy Awards	Best Writing – Television	Nominated
2014	This Hour Has 22 Minutes	Canadian Comedy Awards	Best Writing – Television	Nominated
2014	Meet the Family	Canadian Comedy Awards	Best TV Series	Nominated
2015	Ron Sparks	Canadian Comedy Awards	Best Male Stand-up	Nominated
2015	Meet the Family	Canadian Comedy Awards	Best Writing – Television	Nominated
2015	This Hour Has 22 Minutes	Canadian Comedy Awards	Best Writing – Television	Won
2015	Meet the Family	Canadian Comedy Awards	Best TV Series	Nominated
2015	This Hour Has 22 Minutes	WGC Awards	Best Television Series - Comedy	Nominated
2018	You Got Trumped	Canadian Comedy Awards	Best Web Series	Won
2018	Ron Sparks, You Got Trumped	Canadian Comedy Awards	Best Performance in a Web Series	Won
2018	You Got Trumped	Canadian Comedy Awards	Best Writing in a Web Series	Won
