= Ursus in the Valley of the Lions =

- Directed by: Carlo Ludovico Bragaglia
- Written by: Giuseppe Mangione; Alessandro Continenza
- Produced by: Cine Italia Film/ Giuseppe Fatigati
- Starring: Ed Fury; Alberto Lupo
- Cinematography: Tino Santoni
- Music by: Riz Ortolani
- Distributed by: Medallion
- Release date: April 1962
- Running time: 94 minutes
- Country: Italy
- Language: Italian

Ursus in the Valley of the Lions (Italian: Ursus nella valle dei leoni, also known as Valley of the Lions) is a 1962 Italian sword-and-sandal film directed by Carlo Ludovico Bragaglia. Although it was the fourth film in the Italian "Ursus" series, it was the first to provide Ursus with an origin story, explaining how he was raised by a lioness. Ed Fury once again appears as Ursus and Alberto Lupo plays the villainous Ajak.

When the film was distributed in the US, the title was shortened to simply Valley of the Lions. This film was also distributed as Son of Atlas in the Valley of the Lions.

== Plot ==
The evil dictator Ajak sends his armies to attack a neighboring kingdom, and during the battle, the besieged King Annurius orders one of his subjects to take his son Ursus to a place of safety outside of the city, after first putting a royal medallion around the baby's neck. Ajak kills the king and usurps his throne, but the infant prince is smuggled out of the city to safety.

Later through a series of incidents, the baby Ursus winds up being abandoned alone in a hidden valley in the wilderness where he is adopted and raised by a pride of lions who mistake him for one of their cubs. In a storyline similar to "Tarzan of the Apes", Ursus grows to manhood with the lions as his family.

One day, a caravan of slave girls heading to market breaks down near Ursus' cave and after repairing their wagon, Ursus takes Ania, one of the slave girls, as his payment. During an eventful courtship, Ursus explains despite being raised by lions, he was educated by merchants passing through the valley. Through these interactions however, Ursus learned of the treacherous side of humankind and chose to remain in the wilderness. He offers a place in his home among the lions to Ania who accepts. Unsurprisingly, a mutual attraction evolves into a romance.

The evil king Ajak is still alive and sitting on Ursus' father's throne at this point, and when Ajak hears that Ursus is still alive, he fears that Ursus will one day come seeking revenge and orders his soldiers to journey to the valley of the lions and arrest him. The soldiers kill all but one of the lions with poisoned meat, and when Ursus refuses to surrender, Ajak's men kidnap the slave girl Ania and use her as a hostage to force Ursus to give up. Simba, the last surviving lion of the pride, follows the chained Ursus to Ajak's city, trying to remain close to Ursus in the event that an opportunity to help him arises.

At the climax of the film, Ajak orders that a group of innocent townspeople be dragged into a raging pyre by a group of elephants to which they are chained. Ursus manages to free himself from the king's dungeon and kill Ajak's henchman Lothar by throwing him into a kennel of ferocious, slavering hyenas. Ursus then makes his way to the grand arena and physically holds back the elephants, saving the condemned civilians from a fiery death. When the people realize Ursus is their rightful ruler and revolt against their evil king, Ajak tries to sneak out of the arena, but he is attacked and mauled to death by Simba the lion, who spent the last half of the picture waiting patiently to avenge the deaths of his fellow lions. At the end, the people declare Ursus their king, and with Ania as his queen, Ursus reclaims his father's throne.

== Cast ==
- Ed Fury: Ursus
- Mary Marlon: Ania
- Moira Orfei: Diar
- Alberto Lupo: Ajak
- Mariangela Giordano
- Giacomo Furia: Simud
- Gérard Herter: Lothar
- Andrea Scotti
- Michelle Malaspina
- Orlando Orfei
- Gianni Solaro
