= Ed the Sock =

- First appearance: "Newton Cable (1987)"; Ed's Night Party (1995)
- Portrayed by: Steven Joel Kerzner

In-universe information
- Occupation: Television Host, Television Personality
- Nationality: Canadian

Ed the Sock is a sock puppet character, created and voiced by Steven Joel Kerzner, who first appeared on Canadian local cable television in 1987. He is best known for his hosting appearances in the 1990s on MuchMusic and his own late night talk show, Ed's Night Party. He is a gray sock puppet with green hair, round eyes, a scowl, a cigar and a rough, gravelly voice.

Since the acquisition of MuchMusic by Bell Media in 2011, causing the cancellation of the majority of its music programming, the Ed the Sock character has continued to be portrayed through his self hosted on YouTube FU Network and NewMusicNation.

Kerzner and his wife have since been accused of not paying collaborators, and of defrauding others with their crowdfunding. Further, multiple comments on Kerzner's Indiegogo campaigns reference donors never receiving promised rewards.

== History ==
=== Origination of the Character: Newton Cable (1984–1993) ===
Kerzner originated the character while working at Newton Cable, a small local cable television provider in the city of North York, part of Metropolitan Toronto. In addition to providing cable TV services for parts of the North York neighbourhoods of Downsview, Bathurst Manor, and Westminster-Branson, the company also ran a local cable TV channel. During this time one of the public access shows the station produced needed a co-host on short notice, so Kerzner took a sock and other supplies from the station's craft closet and made a sock puppet with glue caps for eyes. He named the puppet Ed after Ed Asner and co-hosted the segment himself. He enjoyed the experience and continued to do the character, improving the sock puppet's look and changing its voice somewhat over time. In these early years Ed the Sock served as the sidekick to The Late Late Show's human hosts, which included Stan Glass, Harland Williams and Eric Tunney (for almost three years). Tim Rykert also hosted for a time. By 1987 Kerzner became a producer and director of programming.

=== Rogers Cable (1993–1995) ===
After Newton was purchased by Rogers in 1993, Kerzner repackaged The Late Late Show for a wider cable audience. At this point Tunney was its host and star. The new show attracted the interest of producer John Brunton, who took the program to CITY-TV.

=== CityTV (1995–2008) ===
The logo of Ed & Red's Night Party

==== Night Party ====
The show, which would come to be known as Night Party, debuted on February 10, 1995, at 10:30 pm Eastern Time. When Tunney left the show to pursue TV hosting and comedy opportunities in the U.S., he was replaced by "Humble" Howard Glassman (better known as half of the local radio morning show Humble & Fred), and though Ed the Sock was the only returning element of the old show he was still a sidekick to the star and not the star himself. The synopsis of the show's first season reads: "Humble Howard and sidekick Ed the cigar smoking, wise-guy sock host a talk show featuring talent spotlights, celebrity interviews and studio audience interaction".

Within the show's first year Brunton and Glassman both departed the series. Brunton cited creative differences with Kerzner, while Humble Howard said he simply could no longer stand working with Kerzner. Their relationship remains contentious today:

I don't want to say anything about Ed or the midget that has his hand up his ass that hasn't already been said by just about everyone that's met him.

— Howard Glassman

After Humble Howard's departure the show continued with more focus on Ed and less on his human co-host. Canadian comedian Craig Campbell replaced Glassman and stayed with the show for a decade. Ed's longest running co-host, Campbell had a very laid-back demeanor and took a more polite approach with the audience, playing "good cop" to Ed's cruder antics.

In 2004 Ed's Night Party, Campbell was replaced by Steven Joel Kerzner's wife Liana Kerzner (billing herself as "Liana K" and frequently referred to simply as "Red" by Ed). Ed's first female co-host, she was a busty redhead who produced a pin-up calendar of herself which was offered for sale on Ed's website. Liana had dropped out of school in 1997 when she and Kerzner started dating to become a writer and co-producer on the show.

In its final season, the show was re-branded as Ed & Red's Night Party and increasingly emphasized appearances by porn stars, strippers in a hot tub, and the kind of frat-party excesses that Ed used to pillory. This resulted in criticism and complaints, largely from some female viewers who grew tired of the show's overly sexualized and sometimes sexist clips and comments, which included such segments as LoCoDe (Lowest common denominator), porn star visits, and weekly clips of drunk spring break girls in Wet T-shirt contests with Ed providing joke commentary.

In its 14th and final season the series was also broadcast on G4 in the U.S. as part of their Midnight Spank late night television programming block.

In June 2008, Rogers announced that Ed & Red's Night Party would be canceled as of August 31, 2008, in an effort to attract female viewers, some of whom disapproved of Ed's politically incorrect and sexist shtick. The final show aired Friday, August 29, 2008. This also marked the end of Kerzner's relationship with both Much and Citytv, with Kerzner stating after Rogers announced their decision to ax Ed the Sock: "It appears Citytv is heading towards something more of a women's channel, I don't know."

After Night Party's cancellation, Kerzner stated that the Ed character would live on in other projects that were already in the works, "for this fall or possibly a few months after that", including other shows on competing networks and a feature film, though these projects never materialized and he remained off the air for more than two years.

==== Ed's Nite In ====
At CityTV, Ed also hosted Ed's Nite In, a short-lived series in which he would invite "friends" over to watch (and make fun of) bad movies. The show was slightly different from Ed's later bad movie show This Movie Sucks! in that the movies they broadcast were more current in Ed's Nite In and Ed and his friends did not comment during the movies, only before and after commercial breaks, which also included sketches.

=== MuchMusic (1995–2005) ===
After moving Night Party to Citytv, Ed also began making appearances concurrently on MuchMusic. This lasted from the mid-1990s until he was released by Much in 2005.

==== Ed's Big Wham Bam ====
While at Much, Ed hosted the short-lived series Ed's Big Wham Bam, a live weekly two-hour program that featured viewers performing talents such as singing, dancing, and cooking. The show was canceled by the network due to poor ratings.

==== Fromage takeover ====
In the late 1990s, MuchMusic VJ Christopher Ward, the creator of Much's annual Fromage special (so named because it mocked the year's "cheesiest" music videos), decided to no longer host the show himself. Ed accepted an offer to take over hosting duties, which he did until Much canceled the specials in 2005.

Fromage may be the most popular project Ed has been involved with, and he has repeatedly stated that he plans to bring it back in some form.

=== CHCH-TV Hamilton (2010–2012) ===
This Movie Sucks! as seen in the first episode

==== This Movie Sucks! ====
In 2010, after more than two years off the air, Ed returned to television on regional CHCH-TV in Hamilton with This Movie Sucks!, which was similar to his previous CityTV show Ed's Nite In. Kerzner relied on the use of student interns from nearby Mohawk College and the show was initially plagued with technical issues.

The show was once again co-hosted by his wife Liana K and featured comedian Ron Sparks. In each two hour episode Ed has guests over to watch (and make fun of) a bad movie. This Movie Sucks! was named one of the five best television shows of 2010 by Toronto Entertainment and one of the three best new shows of 2010 by Excalibur Magazine. A third season of This Movie Sucks! was reported to be in production but never materialized, with CHCH announcing that no future episode screenings were planned.

==== I Hate Hollywood ====
Produced concurrently with This Movie Sucks! on CHCH-TV was another Ed-hosted series called I Hate Hollywood, which Kerzner based on Fromage's style and template. It was originally supposed to premiere in September 2010, but was pushed back several times until it finally began airing on Wednesday nights, beginning May 2, 2012. The show, once again co-hosted by his wife Liana, made fun of the latest celebrity gossip and news but only lasted a few episodes before being canceled by the network.

Ed the Sock has not had a show on network TV since this show's cancellation by CHCH.

==== The Being Frank Show ====
Ed briefly became Frank D'Angelo's sidekick on The Being Frank Show in 2011–2012, which aired during late night infomercial slots purchased by host and beer entrepreneur Frank D'Angelo on CHCH-TV, the same network that aired This Movie Sucks! and I Hate Hollywood. Kerzner appeared as Ed the Sock in the D'Angelo's 2018 film The Joke Thief.

=== FU Network ===
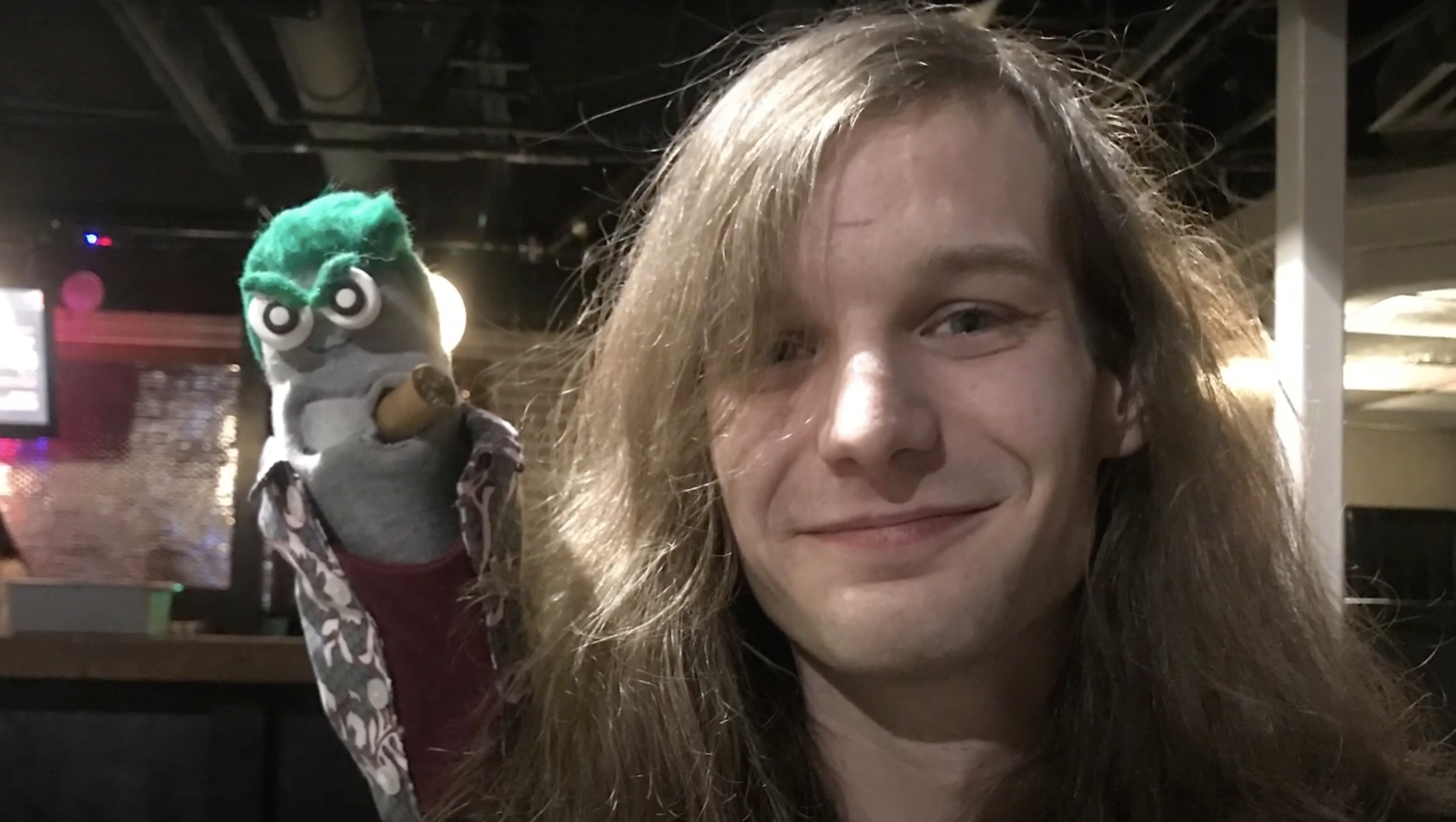
Clint Hoekstra and Ed the Sock in 2018

After launching fundraisers beginning in 2015, in late 2016 Ed the Sock announced the FU Network, a video sharing website, from which he would share old and new clips. He also announced he would begin live streaming a new live weekly show from the entrance/lobby of the Hard Rock Cafe restaurant in downtown Toronto, Ontario called Live from Canada, It's Ed the Sock!

The Toronto location of Hard Rock Cafe closed on May 31, 2017, making future shows from that location impossible.

In April 2017, Ed posted a video to his YouTube channel called "Who Murdered MuchMusic", documenting what he refers to is the demise and downfall of the Canadian music channel by pointing the finger at Bell Media and arguing that their behind the scenes management killed the station. The video was pulled by YouTube after Bell Media complained about copyright infringement stemming from Kerzner's use of footage and logos owned by the conglomerate.

In July 2018, he launched an Indiegogo campaign to have the network officially launch online, promising to bring back old MuchMusic shows from the 1990s and early 2000s. Although his Indiegogo campaign failed to reach his goal of $35,000, Ed announced that he had met the goal through additional PayPal donations people had also made, and that the FU Network launched as planned, it has since been merged with Ed's website.

=== NewMusicNation (2021) ===
In 2021, Ed launched an Indiegogo campaign and website to support NewMusicNation, an online platform for new Canadian music with new VJs. The platform also seeks to support musical acts who have been heavily impacted by the COVID-19 pandemic in Canada.

In May 2023, Ed the Sock was announced as the host of an overnight radio program on 94.9 The Rock in Oshawa, Ontario.

== Controversies ==
=== Night Party ===
Night Party aired in the late-night slot because of its overt depictions of sexuality, primarily involving sexualized, scantily clad (frequently topless) women and Ed's off-color remarks. The show was dismissed by many critics as nothing more than dirty "vaudeville schtick" overly relying on sex and bathroom jokes, with a "phallic in nature and attitude" host described as a "prurient party animal who feeds on his own misanthropy and sexism" and whose comedy, "vacillating between penetrating satire and pointless vulgarity" appealed only to "17 year old boys". Because of the crude, sexist humor, coarse language and nudity, a disclaimer had to preface the airing of every episode in the series' run.

Complaints were filed with the Canadian Broadcast Standards Council throughout the show's run because of the prevalent "sexism" and allegations the show was "derogatory to women", with some of those complaints upheld. A January 2004 episode received criticism and complaints after Ed, Craig and Liana jokingly compared sex with women to stabbing women.

The Ontario Regional Panel reviewed all of the correspondence and screened a tape of the episode in question. The Panel considers that the broadcast of the challenged episode was in breach of Clauses 6 and 11 of the CAB Code of Ethics and Article 7 of the Violence Code.

— Canadian Broadcast Standards Council in an October, 2004 ruling, CBSC Decision 03/04-0516 - October 22, 2004

In a further CBSC decision in March 2005 following a separate complaint, it was ruled that the viewer advisory screened before and during episodes of Night Party was insufficient under the CBA Code of Ethics and needed to be strengthened.

Most infamously, following a stunt with a porn star named Doria in 1999, in which she stripped naked and pretended to have sex in "cowgirl" position with the Ed puppet on her hotel bed, many viewers complained and several stations dropped the show, including the entire province of Alberta where the show was banned for some time.

=== Triumph the Insult Comic Dog ===
Kerzner has accused Triumph the Insult Comic Dog's creator Robert Smigel of ripping off Ed the Sock. The controversy dates back to 1997 when Kerzner claims Ed was set to appear on Late Night with Conan O'Brien but was suddenly cancelled, months before Smigel's Triumph debuted on that show. Conan and NBC maintain that Ed was never even tentatively booked to appear on the show. Kerzner afterwards expressed such resentment towards Triumph and Smigel that NBC stated they "didn't want Ed anywhere near Triumph" when Conan visited Canada for a week of shows during February 2004, with the Canadian network complying.

When Smigel and Pets.com became embroiled in lawsuits over the Triumph and Pets.com dog puppet characters, Kerzner renewed his claims that Triumph had ripped him off. Kerzner claimed that he did not sue Smigel because "we don't want to give that dog that much attention."

=== Other ===
In 2005, Kerzner's Ed's Night Party co-producer James Stamos was ejected from a Toronto Blue Jays game for wearing a shirt promoting the show that other fans complained was offensive. An usher asked him to turn the shirt inside out, but Stamos refused.

After being announced as one of the 2007 Beaches Lions Club Easter Parade marshals, Ed the Sock was removed following dozens of complaints by concerned Beaches residents. The organizers determined Kerzner's act was "too raunchy for a community event" and replaced him with fellow Canadian comedian Luba Goy (of the Royal Canadian Air Farce comedy troupe).

In 2020, Ed the Sock was criticized for what were described as racist comments concerning New Democratic Party leader Jagmeet Singh. NDP MP Don Davies described Ed the Sock's use of "Jughead" to refer to Singh as "pure racism"; several Liberal MPs including Health Minister Patty Hajdu and Minister of Digital Government Joyce Murray condemned Ed the Sock's comments.

== Inspirations ==
Ed's look has become more well defined over the years but is a basic sock puppet design very similar to any other, such as Shari Lewis's famous Lamb Chop and other sock puppet characters.

Kerzner has claimed that Ed's voice is based on two actual people (non-celebrities), a friend's father and step-father, whose names remain undisclosed. However at other times he has said that Ed's voice is a combination of a “friend’s dad, Oscar the Grouch and Jack Klugman from The Odd Couple.”

The name "Ed" was inspired by actor Ed Asner who Kerzner enjoyed watching in The Mary Tyler Moore Show and whose gruff voice is another inspiration for the puppet.

== Other appearances ==
Despite being a vocal critic of Video on Trial and saying he would never appear on it because in his opinion it was never as good as Fromage, Ed was a guest on that show in 2013, nine years after his days as a regular at MuchMusic had ended. It was supposed to be a chance for Ed to reach a "nationwide audience" again, and "expose Ed to a whole new generation." Kerzner said Ed would be in the show's regular rotation of comedians after that, but he never appeared on the show again.

Ed has made some radio appearances and has guested at sci-fi conventions. Kerzner sponsored and co-hosted as Ed (with his wife Liana) the first Constellation Awards in 2007. He also was an advice columnist for Faze Magazine in 2001 and 2002. The Kerzners also have a now-defunct New Year's Eve convention Futurecon, which ended abruptly in 2014 after only running for three years (2011-2014).

On June 23, 2011, Ed and Liana began hosting the short-lived Ed & Red's Podcast for gwmp.tv. They have announced plans to bring their podcast back in some form.

In 2011 Ed made several appearances as Frank D'Angelo's sidekick on The Being Frank Show, a paid infomercial program on CHCH-TV, the same network which formerly produced This Movie Sucks! and I Hate Hollywood.

Kerzner also appeared as a stand-up comedian in his friend Frank D'Angelo's independent film The Joke Thief.

In 2018 Ed appeared as a guest on the fourth episode of Quillette's Wrongspeak podcast.

Ed has made several attempts to be asked to appear on the Juno Awards but has not been successful as of yet. He claims the Junos have a "grudge" against him.

== FU Party ==
In 2010, Ed announced his intention to run for Prime Minister of Canada in the 2011 federal election as head of the new FU Party, a joke political party never registered with Elections Canada, which he claimed stood for "Fed-Up Party". The FU Party's stated goals included "fighting apathy and stupidity in government". Throughout the campaign the "FU Party News Centre" posted links to various articles and videos trying to encourage people to vote and criticizing the political establishment, especially the Conservative government and re-election campaign of Stephen Harper. Around this time, Ed also started his own WordPress blog called "Nobody's Puppet!" where he elaborated his thoughts on politics but also on the media industry.

He searched for volunteer candidates to run in ridings across Canada, as well as a volunteer "Facebook expert" to help promote Ed and his party, until April 2011.

Although the Conservatives actually picked up 23 seats and the Liberals lost 43, Ed declared victory for the FU Party on April 28, 2011, claiming that he had successfully assailed apathy and taking credit for the record turnout at advance polls, although actual voter turnout ended up being only slightly higher than in 2008, which helped the governing Conservative Party to win a majority of seats.

After the election Ed stated that the "Orange Surge" showed Canadians had learned that they have a choice. While not officially endorsing the New Democratic Party, Ed stated that the "NDP has become the FU vote". Ed also stated he hopes the FU Party will continue to provide "smartass commentary for a dumbass political establishment".

In the 2015 election, Ed once again announced he was running for Prime Minister under the FU banner.

== See also ==
- This Movie Sucks!
- Ed & Red's Night Party
