= Ursus in the Land of Fire =

- Directed by: Giorgio Simonelli
- Written by: Marcello Ciorciolini; Luciano Martino
- Produced by: Cine Italia Film
- Starring: Ed Fury; Nando Tamberlani; Claudia Mori; Adriano Micantoni; Luciana Gilli
- Cinematography: Luciano Trasatti
- Edited by: Franco Fraticelli
- Music by: Carlo Savina
- Distributed by: Filmar
- Release date: August 1963
- Running time: 91 minutes
- Country: Italy
- Language: Italian

Ursus in the Land of Fire (Italian: Ursus nella terra di fuoco), released directly to U.S. television as Son of Hercules in the Land of Fire, is a 1963 Italian peplum film directed by Giorgio Simonelli and starring Ed Fury as Ursus, and Adriano Micantoni as the evil usurper, Amilcare.

== Plot ==
The evil General Amilcare usurps the throne of King Lotar, after murdering him with the aid of the king's niece, Mila. He then destroys a nearby village, killing or enslaving the people, which causes local hero Ursus to intervene and combat the dictator. Ursus enters a gladiator tournament in disguise and challenges Amilcare's authority, but is caught and put to manual labour.

King Lotar's daughter, Diana, is still being held prisoner and calls upon the help of Ursus, who escapes and does battle with Amilcare in an underground volcanic cavern.

== Cast ==
- Ed Fury as Ursus
- Claudia Mori as Mila
- Luciana Gilli as Princess Diana
- Adriano Micantoni as Amilcare/Hamilon
- Nando Tamberlani as Lotar
- Pietro Ceccarelli as Lero
- Giuseppe Addobbati as The Magistrate
- Tom Felleghy as The Official
- Diego Pozzetto
- Claudia Giannotti
