= The Drunk and On Drugs Happy Funtime Hour =

Canadian television comedy series

- Genre: Sketch comedy
- Created by: Robb Wells; John Paul Tremblay; Mike Smith
- Written by: John Paul Tremblay; Robb Wells; Mike Smith
- Directed by: Ron Murphy
- Starring: John Paul Tremblay; Robb Wells; Mike Smith; John Dunsworth; Pat Roach; Maury Chaykin; Jay Baruchel; Amy Sedaris; Luke Gordon
- Country of origin: Canada
- No. of seasons: 1
- No. of episodes: 6

Production
- Production location: Halifax Regional Municipality

Original release
- Network: Action
- Release: July 22 – August 5, 2011

The Drunk and On Drugs Happy Funtime Hour is a Canadian television sketch comedy series, which aired during the 2011 television season on Action.

Described by its producers as "Curb Your Enthusiasm after it got smashed in the head with a hammer and force-fed liquor and drugs", the show stars Trailer Park Boys actors John Paul Tremblay, Robb Wells and Mike Smith as fictionalized versions of themselves. The fictional trio are starring in a new sketch comedy series, Happy Funtime Hour, but their production goes awry when a mad scientist named Doctor Funtime (Maury Chaykin) forces them to ingest a hallucinogenic substance he created. The actors must endure unpredictable events while constantly meeting different characters. The show features high quality prosthetic and makeup work to portray a wide range of off-the-wall characters, including pirates, superheroes, mafia, WWII Canadian (sandwich) soldiers (armed with live rounds), drug dealers, cult members, ambulance drivers, etc. Particularly disturbing characters abound, such as an armless pizza chef, a cleaner who appears to use his enormous dangling tongue, and an old gypsy woman who pays for "sugar," a euphemism for male loving. The sequences between characters feature segues such as tvs or radios, and the show features shifts of perspective from present day to WWII or pirates.

== Cast ==
The supporting cast includes Maury Chaykin, John Dunsworth, Patrick Roach, Jay Baruchel, Richard Collins, Amy Sedaris and Luke Gordon. All three main actors also play numerous minor and one-off characters, utilizing an array of prosthetics.

== Premiere ==
The series premiered in Canada on 22 July 2011, and aired two episodes three Friday evenings in a row. Due to poor reception and also because of the death of Maury Chaykin, the series has been cancelled. Chaykin's "mad scientist" character had already been re-cast once; musician Alex Lifeson was originally set to take on that role before bowing out in early 2010.

== List of characters ==
=== John Paul Tremblay ===
- John Paul Tremblay (Himself)
- Sammy Brutto
- Karen Sunshine
- Captain Reginald Scary
- Chip
- Flex Fearless
- Lightning Stick O'Leigh
- Paul Colomb

=== Robb Wells ===
- Robb Wells (Himself)
- Stabby Brutto
- Moley Brutto
- Chris Tall
- Peter P. Squalls
- Chase Lightning
- Rico
- Kris Kream

=== Mike Smith ===
- Mike Smith (Himself)
- Don Brutto
- Joelp Fuckerton
- Elson Bandle-Hiover
- Liza
- Russfert Thelonious Diggins
- Blaise
- Captain Mega Power
- DJ Dazzie Daddle

=== Other characters ===
- K. Money
- Samantha
- Sasquatch
- Jackson Packinsteel
- Papa Karlson
- Dr. Funtime
- Maury Chaykin (Himself)
- Potatoes
- Dr. Fieldiveory
- Cincinnati Harry
- Big Ron
- Commander Mayo
- Speedy Pete
- Falcon
- Patrick Roach (Himself)

=== Sandwich Soldiers ===
- Jay Baruchel
- Andrew Bush
- Daniel Lillford
- Jason Daley
- Michael Ray Fox

== List of episodes ==
Title	Original airdate	Season Episode #	Total Episodes #
Maury Chaykin F**ked Us	July 22, 2011	1	1
Former Trailer Park Boys stars Mike Smith, Robb Wells and John Paul Tremblay wake up in the town of Port Cockerton months after an attempt to film a variety show called The Happy Funtime Hour, to find all of the cast and crew they hired addicted to a powerful hallucinogen.
Sexual Metal Underwear	July 22, 2011	2	2
The boys attempt to leave town, but get sidetracked by a pair of locked metal underwear, a meeting with cult members at the hospital, and a deal they are forced to make with the Brutto's to return Cincinnati Harry before they get stabbed to death with corn holders.
Robbie Krishna and The Bigron	July 29, 2011	3	3
The Cristall Hearts Sunshine Parish make a profound impression on Robb causing Stabby Brutto to get captured by the Sandwich Soldiers as they pursue Nazis. Don Brutto's health continues to deteriorate and Captain Megapower is taken hostage by a sexually confused Sasquatch.
Where in the F**k is Cincinnati Harry?	July 29, 2011	4	4
K-Money's frustration escalates when she is still unable to reach the boys who have been taken prisoner by Joelp. Stabby is tortured by the cult members as Chase Lightning and Flex Fearless search for Captain Megapower. Cincinnati Harry is found but the boys are taken captive by the pirates who finger JP.
Piss, Gas and the Eiffel Tower	August 5, 2011	5	5
Pat sends Mike to look for Robb and JP and to get gas for the generator keeping Cincinnati Harry alive. Falcon pulls ahead of Speedy Pete in the race for Port Cockerton's number one ambulance service and the boys end up in the clutches of a very unhappy Brutto family.
Sucking Off K Money (The Festival of Death)	August 5, 2011	6	6
All worlds collide at Don Brutto's Festival of Death and the boys are confronted by Dr. Funtime and a very pissed off Katherine Money.
