= Trailer Park Boys: Jail =

Canadian mockumentary television series

- Genre: Mockumentary; Sitcom; Black comedy; Crime comedy
- Written by: Mike Smith; John Paul Tremblay; Robb Wells
- Directed by: Bruce McCulloch
- Starring: John Paul Tremblay; Robb Wells; Mike Smith; Patrick Roach; Cory Bowles; Jacob Rolfe; Sarah Dunsworth-Nickerson; Alex Lifeson; Dave Lawrence
- Theme music composer: Blain Morris
- Composers: Blain Morris; Marc Mysterio
- Country of origin: Canada
- Original language: English
- No. of seasons: 2
- No. of episodes: 18

Production
- Producers: Gary Howsam; Aaron Horton; Jacqueline Kelly; John Rosborough; Mike Smith; Louis Thomas; John Paul Tremblay; Robb Wells
- Cinematography: Adamm Liley
- Editors: Sarah Byrne; Kyle Walsh
- Production company: Swearnet Pictures

Original release
- Release: January 1, 2021 – present

Trailer Park Boys: Jail is a Canadian mockumentary television series created by John Paul Tremblay, Robb Wells and Mike Smith. It is a spin-off of the series Trailer Park Boys. The show follows the misadventures of a group of trailer park residents, mostly from inside the prison.

== Production ==
The filming of a new season of Trailer Park Boys was announced on 1 October 2019 on the official facebook page of Trailer Park Boys. Dave Lawrence was added to the series for the first time.

A second season was greenlit and announced by Mike Smith via Swearnet and social media. Pre-production on season 2 began on March 13, 2023 and production of the season wrapped on April 25, 2023.

== Cast ==
=== Main ===
- John Paul Tremblay as Julian
- Robb Wells as Ricky
- Mike Smith as Bubbles
- Patrick Roach as Randy
- Cory Bowles as Corey
- Jacob Rolfe as Jacob
- Sarah Dunsworth-Nickerson as Sarah
- Alex Lifeson
- Dave Lawrence

=== Guests ===
- Marguerite McNeil as Marguerite Murphy (season 1)

== Release ==
The series premiered on swearnet.com on January 1, 2021. A second Christmas special was also announced, featuring unseen footage of John Dunsworth before his death in October 2017. In October 2022, the series was removed from Swearnet with only the shorts remaining on the site. As of July 14, 2025, the series was made available again via Netflix and Trailer Park Boys+.

Season 2 officially premiered on Netflix in Canada on June 13, 2025. On August 8, 2025 the second season was released on Trailer Park Boys+ in the United States.

== Episodes ==
=== Season 1 (2021) ===
No. in season	Title	Directed by	Written by	Original release date
1	"I Wish I Had A 65 Inch Cock"	Bruce McCulloch	Mike Smith, JP Tremblay, Robb Wells	January 1, 2021
Guess what - Ricky and Julian are back in jail. But that's OK, jail's cool and the Boys are ready to get fucked up and high! But there's one BIG problem. Can Julian figure this one out?
2	"Red, Raw Arseholes"	Bruce McCulloch	Mike Smith, JP Tremblay, Robb Wells	January 7, 2021
Julian's about to clean up with his new money-making scheme, but can Bubbles deliver the goods? Meanwhile, a desperate Ricky and Terry attempt to get high as fuck, any way they can.
3	"Alright Lungs, Prepare To Blow A Load"	Bruce McCulloch	Mike Smith, JP Tremblay, Robb Wells	January 14, 2021
Ricky's horny as fuck and ready to bang his new lady, Julian is worried about Terry's influence, and Bubbles comes up with a colourful plan to deliver supplies. But things are about to blow up like a balloon mongoose...
4	"Goddamn Weed And Scrotums"	Bruce McCulloch	Mike Smith, JP Tremblay, Robb Wells	January 21, 2021
The Sunnyvale Correctional Facility has a crazy new inmate - and he's got the best hash in town. Ricky and Terry hatch a plan to get a big lungful of that sweet Temple Ball smoke.
5	"Hardcore Gay Porno Video DJ"	Bruce McCulloch	Mike Smith, JP Tremblay, Robb Wells	January 28, 2021
Bubbles and Randy are looking forward to an old-fashioned sleepover, with comfy jammies and a Brad Pitt movie. But all hell is breaking loose in the Sunnyvale Correctional Facility, and Julian and Ricky need some big favours, fast. Bubbles' day is about to get GREASY!
6	"RASH"	Bruce McCulloch	Mike Smith, JP Tremblay, Robb Wells	February 4, 2021
Bubbles gets some bad news - are his hopes and dreams fackin' dashed? But on the upside, the Sunnyvale Correctional Facility has a new inmate, and he knows how to get things done...
7	"The Bionic Burnout"	Bruce McCulloch	Mike Smith, JP Tremblay, Robb Wells	February 11, 2021
Alex Lifeson left Ricky a gift under his pillow, but someone else got there first! Can the Boys figure out who, with the help of Terry's fucked-up ear? Meanwhile, Randy makes a difficult decision, but a man's gotta eat...
8	"Freddy Gets Fingered"	Bruce McCulloch	Mike Smith, JP Tremblay, Robb Wells	February 18, 2021
Sunnyvale Correctional Facility's warden is back in town - and he's not fucking around! Can Julian dance his way out of this one with the help of Cory and Jacob? Meanwhile, it's Smokey's first day back on the job, but does anyone wanna party?
9	"Too Fucked Up Even For Jail"	Bruce McCulloch	Mike Smith, JP Tremblay, Robb Wells	February 25, 2021
Julian and the Roc-Pile learn the hard way that there's a big difference between 'get' and 'got'. And there's another problem - Julian and Ricky have an interview with the parole board...
10	"Shoot For The Clouds"	Bruce McCulloch	Mike Smith, JP Tremblay, Robb Wells	March 4, 2021
Bubbles is in danger - can Terry hold off the angry mob until Ricky and Julian figure out a plan? Bubbles is a dead man if he don't give up the hash, man!

==== Trailer Park Boys: Jail Shorts (2021) ====
No.	Title	Directed by	Written by	Original release date
1	"Greatest Fucking Day Of The Week"	Mike Smith, JP Tremblayy, Robb Wells	Mike Smith, JP Tremblay, Robb Wells	March 11, 2021
It's Chicken Finger Day in the jail canteen and Ricky's excited as fuck! No-one gets between him and his beloved chicken fingers (the good kind). Or do they?
2	"My Fucking Arm, It Ate It"	Mike Smith, JP Tremblay, Robb Wells	Mike Smith, JP Tremblay, Robb Wells	March 18, 2021
Ricky vs. a pepperoni vending machine. Who do you think's gonna win?
3	"Think Like Warren Buffett"	Mike Smith, JP Tremblay, Robb Wells	Mike Smith, JP Tremblay, Robb Wells	March 25, 2021
Julian's making some serious cash - he's got what people need, and boy do they fucking need it! Because when you gotta go...
4	"Snacks For A Week"	Mike Smith, JP Tremblay, Robb Wells	Mike Smith, JP Tremblay, Robb Wells	April 1, 2021
The stakes (and Doritos) are high as Ricky, Julian and Bubbles play 'What The Fuck Did He Do To Get In Jail'. Who's gonna be feasting on noodle soup and crackers tonight?
5	"I'll Fuck With A Piece Of Cake"	Mike Smith, JP Tremblay, Robb Wells	Mike Smith, JP Tremblay, Robb Wells	April 8, 2021
There's a big surprise for Bubbles, with cake, chips and condom balloons. But Ricky has one more treat... prepare for takeoff!
6	"Home Is Where You're Bloomed"	Dave Lawrence	Mike Smith, JP Tremblay, Robb Wells	April 15, 2021
While Terry is showing the crew some badass moves, he discovers a secret. Has he found fucking freedom... or something else?
7	"A Gorilla With His Banana"	Mike Smith, JP Tremblay, Robb Wells	Mike Smith, JP Tremblay, Robb Wells	April 22, 2021
Gorilla Fingers gets to grips with the delicate subject of STDs. It's a dirty frigging job, but someone's gotta do it!
8	"Home Sweet Fuckin Home"	Dave Lawrence	Immanuela Lawrence	April 29, 2021
Terry builds a sweet little house for his new buddy. Fuck's sake Terry, ya softie! But like they say, home is the heart of the universe!
9	"Horrible Fuckin News"	Mike Smith, JP Tremblay, Robb Wells	Mike Smith, JP Tremblay, Robb Wells	May 6, 2021
Ricky's been to the infirmary and has some bad news to share with Julian and Bubbles...
10	"It'd Be Easier If They Put A Cock On The King"	Mike Smith, JP Tremblay, Robb Wells	Mike Smith, JP Tremblay, Robb Wells	May 13, 2021
Bubbles gives Ricky a masterclass in chess for the jail tournament. Rule #1 - there's no fucking dice in chess! It's gonna be a long evening...
11	"The Red Must Be The Blue"	Mike Smith, JP Tremblay, Robb Wells	Mike Smith, JP Tremblay, Robb Wells	May 20, 2021
Ricky has given Bubbles the task of looking after his weed plants. Easy, huh? Just give 'em some red, green, and blue. But which is which?
12	"Maybe My Cock Comes Out"	Mike Smith, JP Tremblay, Robb Wells	Mike Smith, JP Tremblay, Robb Wells	May 27, 2021
Ricky's having a bad morning. An unwelcome piss boner, no ice cream for breakfast... This jail fucking sucks!
13	"A Date With Class"	Mike Smith, JP Tremblay, Robb Wells	Mike Smith, JP Tremblay, Robb Wells	June 3, 2021
Forget chicken and banging, boys! Yolanda teaches the inmates how to behave on a romantic date. What could possibly go wrong?
14	"Is It Safe To Pull This Thing Out?"	Mike Smith, JP Tremblay, Robb Wells	Mike Smith, JP Tremblay, Robb Wells	June 10, 2021
Ricky has a new medical complaint - what the fuck is up with him this time? Bubbles rushes to the Sunnyvale Correctional Facility to investigate...
15	"I Don't Want No Trouble Trouble"	Mike Smith, JP Tremblay, Robb Wells	Mike Smith, JP Tremblay, Robb Wells	June 17, 2021
Fuck the Olympics, it's the annual Pop-O-Matic game tournament at the Sunnyvale Correctional Facility! Can Terry's lucky thumb win Julian some serious coin?

== Premise ==
Episodes revolve around Sunnyvale Trailer Park residents Ricky and Julian being in Sunnyvale Correctional Facility while they try to party only to realize things are not the same in prison anymore.
