= Robb Wells =

Canadian actor and screenwriter

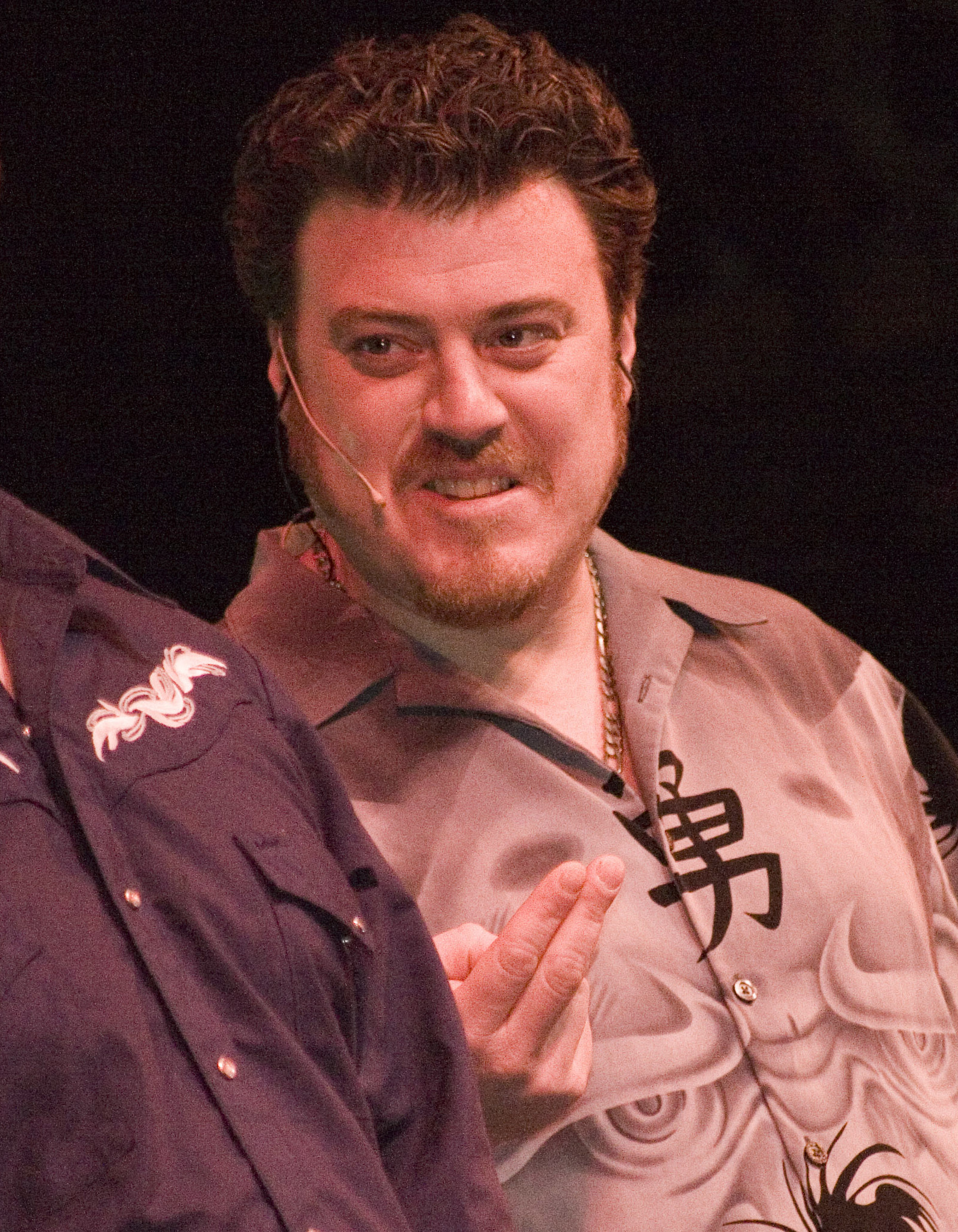
- Wells in character as Ricky in April 2009
- Born: Robert Christopher Wells; March 20, 1971 (age 55); Moncton, New Brunswick, Canada
- Occupations: Actor, comedian, screenwriter
- Years active: 1995–present
- Known for: Trailer Park Boys

Robert Christopher "Robb" Wells (born March 20, 1971) is a Canadian actor, comedian, and screenwriter best known for portraying Ricky in Trailer Park Boys.

== Early life ==
Wells was graduated from Saint Mary's University in 1993 with a Bachelor of Commerce degree. In January 2006, The Globe and Mail published an article in which it was revealed that Wells is a distant cousin of the former Prime Minister of Canada, Stephen Harper.

== Career ==
In 2002, Wells appeared with John Paul Tremblay and John Dunsworth in the film Virginia’s Run starring Gabriel Byrne and Joanne Whalley, playing characters similar to their Trailer Park Boys characters. Wells also featured in The Boondock Saints II: All Saints Day.

In 2010, Wells reunited with many of his former Trailer Park Boys cast-mates in the new series The Drunk and On Drugs Happy Fun Time Hour. Wells appeared in the film Hobo with a Shotgun, released to theaters on March 25, 2011.

In August 2011, Wells made a cameo appearance in the independent film Jackhammer, shot in Victoria, British Columbia. Wells also appeared as a radical Nova Scotian separatist freedom fighter/terrorist in the FX TV series Archer in its third season in an episode entitled "The Limited." His Trailer Park Boys co-stars John Paul Tremblay and Mike Smith also had credited voice-over roles in the episode. Wells also starred in the horror movie Would You Rather in 2012 as Peter.

In October 2012, Wells, along with Tremblay and Smith, signed on to return to Trailer Park Boys in a third film that started filming in March 2013 and was released April 18, 2014.

On July 4, 2013, it was announced that Wells, Tremblay and Smith had acquired the rights to Trailer Park Boys and confirmed it would return with eighth and ninth seasons to be aired on the internet channel SwearNet.com. Seasons 8 through 12 of Trailer Park Boys aired on Netflix, beginning on September 5, 2014.

In 2014, Wells co-starred, co-wrote, and co-produced Swearnet with his Trailer Park Boys colleagues.

== Filmography ==
=== Film ===
Year	Title	Role	Notes
1995	The Cart Boy	Ricky	Unaired; Short film
1998	One Last Shot	Rob	Short film
1999	Trailer Park Boys	Ricky	
2002	Virginia's Run	Rob	
2004	Dear Santa Claus, Go Fuck Yourself	Ricky LaFleur	
2006	Trailer Park Boys: The Movie	Ricky LaFleur	
2006	Hearts of Dartmouth: Life of a Trailer Park Girl	Ricky LaFleur	
2007	Trailer Park Boys 101	Ricky LaFleur	
2009	The Boondock Saints II: All Saints Day	Jimmy the Gofer	
2009	Trailer Park Boys: Countdown to Liquor Day	Ricky	
2011	Hobo with a Shotgun	Logan	Credited as Rob Wells
2011	The Drunk and On Drugs Happy Fun Time Hour	Stabby Brutto	
2012	Jackhammer	Rocko	
2012	The Back Nine		
2012	Goon	Production Assistant #1	Uncredited
2012	Beat Down	Whitey	
2012	Would You Rather	Peter	
2014	Trailer Park Boys: Don't Legalize It	Ricky	
2014	Swearnet Live	Robb Wells / Ricky	
2014	Swearnet: The Movie	Robb Wells	
2014	Relative Happiness	Kenny	
2014	Trailer Park Boys: Live at the North Pole	Ricky	
2015	Drunk, High and Unemployed (Live in Austin)	Ricky	
2015	Being Canadian		Documentary
2021	Dawn, Her Dad and the Tractor	John Andrew MacGinnis	
2022	Vandits	Ramone	
2024	Standing on the Shoulders of Kitties	Ricky	

=== Television ===
Year	Title	Role	Notes
2001–present	Trailer Park Boys	Ricky LaFleur	
2008	Trailer Park Boys: Say Goodnight to the Bad Guys	Ricky LaFleur	Television film
2012	Archer	Kenny Bilko	Episode: "The Limited"
2014	Live in Fuckin' Dublin	Ricky LaFleur	Television film
2016	Trailer Park Boys: Out of the Park: Europe	Ricky LaFleur	
2017	Trailer Park Boys: Out of the Park: USA	Ricky LaFleur	
2019–2020	Trailer Park Boys: The Animated Series	Ricky LaFleur (voice)	
2021–present	Trailer Park Boys: Jail	Ricky LaFleur	Also executive producer and writer
2023	Hudson & Rex	Toby Blue	Episode: "Jail Break"
2024–2026	The Trades	Todd	
