= Trailer Park Boys: The Movie =

- Theatrical poster
- Directed by: Mike Clattenburg
- Screenplay by: Mike Clattenburg; Robb Wells
- Based on: Trailer Park Boys by Mike Clattenburg
- Produced by: Mike Clattenburg
- Starring: Robb Wells; John Paul Tremblay; Mike Smith
- Cinematography: Miroslaw Baszak
- Edited by: Jeremy Harty
- Music by: Blain Morris
- Production companies: Alliance Atlantis; Odeon Films; Cavu Pictures; Showcase Original Movie; Topsail Entertainment; Trailer Park Productions; The Montecito Picture Company
- Distributed by: Motion Picture Distribution LP
- Release date: October 6, 2006
- Running time: 95 minutes
- Countries: Canada; United States
- Language: English
- Budget: $5 million
- Box office: $3,868,567

Trailer Park Boys: The Movie (also known as Trailer Park Boys: Countdown to The Big Dirty and simply Trailer Park Boys) is a 2006 Canadian comedy crime film based on the television series Trailer Park Boys itself a sequel to the 1999 film of the same name. The film follows characters Ricky, Julian, and Bubbles creating a plan for the Big Dirty, one last crime that will enable them to retire from their criminal lives. The film, like the series, was directed and produced by Mike Clattenburg, with Ivan Reitman as an executive producer. It was released in Canada on October 6, 2006, and a limited release in the United States began on January 25, 2008. It has developed into a cult film since then.

== Plot ==
Julian plans to steal money from an automated teller machine. He gets his two best friends, Ricky and Bubbles, to help him succeed in the operation and get rich. However, things do not go according to plan and they are chased by the police. Bubbles runs off and is spared by the cops, while Ricky and Julian are arrested and get sent to jail for an 18-month term.

Donny, the jail instructor, kicks Ricky and Julian out of jail 26 days early to prevent Ricky from playing goalie for a rival team, giving Donny and his team a chance to win an upcoming jail street-hockey tournament. Ricky and Julian are picked up by Bubbles and Ricky's father, Ray, and are brought back to Sunnyvale Trailer Park, only to be greeted by the trailer-park supervisor Jim Lahey and his shirtless, cheeseburger-loving assistant, Randy.

Ricky decides to get back with his girlfriend Lucy and become a better father to their daughter, Trinity. However, Ricky learns from Lucy's friend Sarah that Lucy has a new job at a strip club and she also got new breast implants and her boss Sonny is a dangerous man. Ricky, Julian, Bubbles, along with Cory and Trevor, go to the strip club where Ricky meets Lucy and Julian flirts with a stripper, Wanda. After the strip club, Ricky becomes determined to do the "Big Dirty", one massive crime with a payout that will allow him to retire, while Julian follows the advice of an inmate he met and begins to steal numerous small amounts of change to stay below the police's radar.

Julian and Wanda go to the movies on their first date. While waiting in the snack line, Julian sees a money machine filled with change and believes he has found a way to combine his idea with Ricky's "Big Dirty" and informs Ricky and Bubbles of the plan. Ricky returns to the strip club to inform Lucy he would like her and Trinity to live with him as a family. They are interrupted by Sonny however and Ricky leaves when he learns Sonny and Lucy had sex while he was in prison. At a party at J-Roc's trailer Ricky and Lucy reconcile and he proposes to her, which she accepts.

Lahey conspires to have the boys evicted by falsely reporting to his ex-wife Barb that Ricky, Julian, and Bubbles' lot fees are three months behind. To pay the "missing" back rent and avoid eviction the boys decide to do the Big Dirty at the movie theatre but attract unwanted attention when Cory and Trevor accidentally pull a fire-alarm. Despite the attention the boys are able to escape with the change in Ricky's trunk.

At Ricky and Lucy's wedding, Sonny confronts them both with a handgun and shoots at Ricky's car, causing the money to fall out through the bullet holes in the trunk. Police officers George Green and Ted Johnston arrest Wanda for outstanding arrest warrants and she subsequently reports Sonny's firearm usage to the police. Lahey sees the money falling out of the car and reports their theft before chasing them with the police. Lahey and Randy flip their car and the cops crash into Ricky's car, causing the money to fly out.

In court, Ricky argues the photographic evidence only shows Cory and Trevor and that the only evidence of his, Julian and Bubbles' involvement is Lahey's testimony. Ricky then demands Lahey use a breathalyzer to see if Lahey is drunk or not to determine whether he is a credible witness. Lahey is revealed to be drunk and the boys are declared innocent by the judge who also orders the change returned to them since there is no proof it came from criminal activity.

A victorious Ricky tells off Lahey, but this causes the judge to threaten to charge Ricky with contempt of court and to sentence him to a week in jail. Realizing this means he would be sent to jail in time to play in the street hockey tournament, Ricky gets permission to go to jail for a week from Lucy and Trinity before swearing at the judge, Lahey and Randy. Ricky is sentenced to a week in jail for contempt of court. Ricky's team faces Donny's team in the finals and wins due to a key save by Ricky while Cory and Trevor gain the prisoners' respect after "pantsing" Donny in front of everyone.

Ricky, Trinity and Lucy go on to live as a happy family; Bubbles builds a new shed and performs his "Super Cats Catshow"; Julian reunites with Wanda after she finishes her prison sentence; Cory and Trevor drive their snowmobile together; Lahey and Randy continue to supervise the park; J-Roc and Tyrone perform rap shows; and Ray drinks and rolls around in his wheelchair.

== Cast ==
Actor	Role
Robb Wells	Ricky
John Paul Tremblay	Julian
Mike Smith	Bubbles
John Dunsworth	Jim Lahey
Patrick Roach	Randy
Jonathan Torrens	J-Roc
Cory Bowles	Cory
Michael Jackson	Trevor
Lucy DeCoutere	Lucy
Sarah E. Dunsworth	Sarah
Barrie Dunn	Ray
Lydia Lawson-Baird	Trinity
Nichole Hiltz	Wanda
Gerry Dee	Donny
Hugh Dillon	Sonny
Alex Lifeson	Cop #1
Gord Downie	Cop #2
Scotty Mars	Bouncer
Eugene Clark	Cadillac

== Reception ==
Trailer Park Boys: The Movie has received mixed to positive reviews. On the review aggregator website Rotten Tomatoes, 57% of 23 critics' reviews are positive, with an average rating of 5.5/10. The website's consensus reads: "Trailer Park Boys suffers from its small-screen origins, and its tasteless humor is not for everyone, but it will satisfy fans of the genre."

=== Box office ===
Trailer Park Boys was the highest-grossing movie in Canada for its first weekend in release October 7–8, 2006. The movie grossed an estimated $1.3 million at the box office in its opening weekend becoming the 11th top-grossing film in North America for that weekend. It had a per-screen average of $6,632 over the three-day weekend, and played on over 200 screens. As of November 19, 2006, the film had grossed $3.87 million.

=== Awards and recognition ===
The movie was nominated in three categories for the 27th Genie Awards in 2007:

- Best Motion Picture
- Best Performance by an Actor in a Supporting Role (Hugh Dillon)
- Best Adapted Screenplay

== Soundtrack ==
Trailer Park Boys: The Movie

Soundtrack album
- Released: October 10, 2006
- Genre: Soundtrack
- Label: Anthem

1. "Big Dirty Drums"
2. "I Fought the Law" covered by The Big Dirty Band (original composition by Sonny Curtis and The Crickets)
3. "38 Years Old" by The Tragically Hip
4. "The Spirit of Radio" by Rush
5. "Scared" by The Tragically Hip
6. "Trailer Park Life" by J-Roc
7. "Credulence"
8. "Sweet Leaf" covered by Alexisonfire (original composition by Black Sabbath)
9. "All Touch" by Rough Trade
10. "Shithawks"
11. "I'm on Fire for You Baby" covered by April Wine (original composition by David Elliott)
12. "Bobcaygeon" by The Tragically Hip
13. "Orca" by Wintersleep
14. "Swamp Water" by Swollen Members
15. "Ricky's Day in Court"
16. "Liquor & Whores" by Bubbles & The Shit Rockers
17. "Heavy Metal Love" by Helix

The Trailer Park Boys soundtrack debuted at #48 on the Canadian Albums Chart.

== DVD release ==
Trailer Park Boys: The Movie is available in Canada on DVD. It was released on February 20, 2007.

== Sequels ==
On August 27, 2008, it was announced by Alliance Films that there was a second TPB movie being filmed. The movie, titled "Countdown To Liquor Day", is a continuation of the final TPB special, "Say Goodnight To The Bad Guys". The film was released in theaters on September 25, 2009. The third and final film in the franchise "Trailer Park Boys: Don't Legalize it!" was released on April 18, 2014.
