= Mike Smith (actor) =

Canadian actor and musician

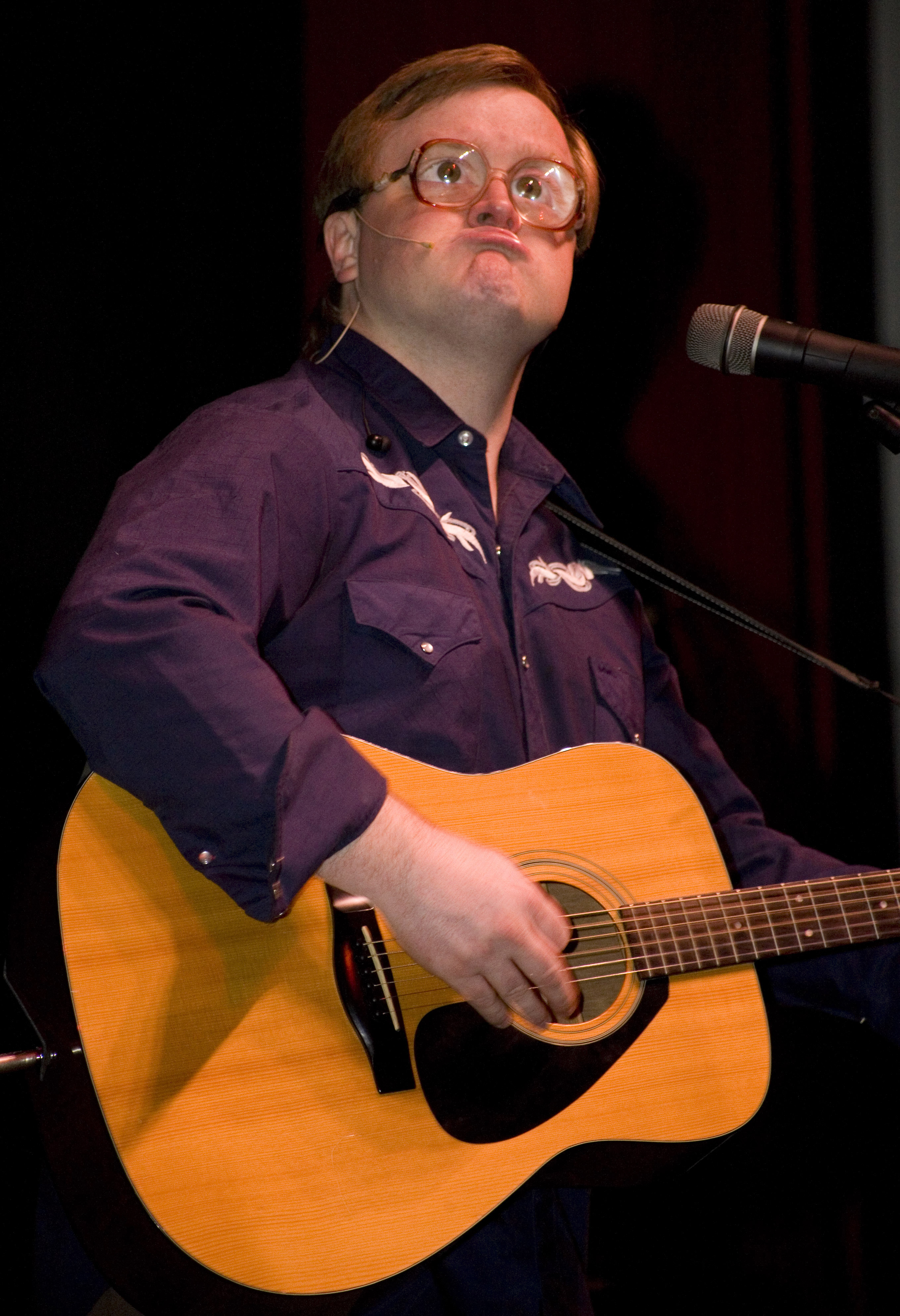
- Smith as Bubbles in 2009
- Born: 1971 or 1972 (age 53–54); New Glasgow, Nova Scotia, Canada
- Occupations: Actor, screenwriter, comedian, singer-songwriter
- Years active: 1992–present
- Spouse: Lisa Smith
- Children: 2

Michael Edwin Smith is a Canadian actor, screenwriter, comedian, and musician. He is best known for his portrayal of Bubbles and as co-writer of the cult classic television program, films and stage production Trailer Park Boys. He was also the guitarist for the Canadian rock band Sandbox. Smith earned a degree in English from St. Francis Xavier University in Antigonish, Nova Scotia.

== Musical interest ==
Before becoming involved in Trailer Park Boys, he was a guitarist in the rock band Sandbox, and signed a record deal with EMI in Canada, and Nettwerk in the United States. Sandbox released two albums with EMI and Nettwerk, entitled Bionic and A Murder in the Glee Club. Sandbox was nominated for a Juno Award, East Coast Music Awards, and a CASBY Award.

Smith has worked on such films as The Weight of Water as a sound mixer, and Serendipity as a cableman.

Later, Smith performed as part of Bubbles & the Shit Rockers, a band that also featured founding Rush guitarist Alex Lifeson and Tom Wilson for the original song "Liquor & Whores" featured on Trailer Park Boys: The Movie Soundtrack. A Trailer Park Boys episode also features Smith's character Bubbles playing the 1977 Rush track "Closer to the Heart" with Alex Lifeson.

Smith has performed "Liquor & Whores" with Guns N' Roses on multiple occasions on their Chinese Democracy Tour, in 2006, 2010 and 2011.

Smith has also recorded with Emm Gryner in "Get Brave" released in 2010.

== Acting career ==
Smith had been a long-time friend of Trailer Park Boys director Mike Clattenburg, and starred in "Cart Boy" with Robb Wells (who plays Ricky) and John Paul Tremblay (who plays Julian) in 1995.

Smith was "messing" around on the set one day and slipped into his Cart Boy character from the short "The Cart Boy". Clattenburg apparently realized the depth this character held, and the Cart Boy, now known as Bubbles, was written into the show. Bubbles was never intended to be a main character, but the more outrageously he behaved, the more audiences loved him, developing him to become a breakout character. Bubbles then became one of the three main protagonists, having established that he knew Julian and Ricky from school back in the late 1970s to high school in the late '80s.

One of Bubbles' signature characteristics are his glasses. Smith recalled their origin: "My girlfriend at the time was in Texas visiting family and they went to an estate sale and she found these glasses. They were 50 cents, and she knew that I would think they were funny because they were so thick, so she bought them as a joke. There was a picture of the old lady who the glasses belonged to, too. She only had 50 cents on her, so she bought the glasses but not the picture. I would love to have that picture."

Smith made an appearance as Bubbles in Snow's 2002 music video Legal, but his swearing remained censored. He was also featured in Country Star George Canyon's video for "Drinkin Thinkin", which showed Bubbles going after his girlfriend. Mike and the rest of the Trailer park boys appeared in The Tragically Hip video, "The Darkest One". He has appeared in character as Bubbles at several Guns N' Roses 2006 Canadian tour dates and dates in Australia and Japan in 2007. Bubbles, along with Ricky and Julian, hosted the 2006 and the 2007 East Coast Music Awards, in Charlottetown, Prince Edward Island and Halifax, Nova Scotia respectively.

Smith also was involved in another bar, "Bubbles' Mansion", located in Downtown Halifax. The bar, partly owned by Smith, closed in March 2010 after four years of operation, a decision the management attributed to government hikes in the minimum wage and minimum drink prices.

In 2010, Smith reunited with many of his former Trailer Park Boys castmates in the new series The Drunk and On Drugs Happy Fun Time Hour. The 6-episode series centres on the idea that a powerful narcotic derived from local berries transforms the cast, leading them to believe they are the characters they're playing, including pirates, superheroes, a mafia family and drug dealers. Tremblay, Wells and Smith, who created and scripted the show, performed in many scenes opposite themselves. It was directed by sitcom veteran Ron Murphy.

He also performed a live version of "Closer to the Heart" with progressive rock band Rush.

On October 22, 2012, it was confirmed that Smith was to return to his role as Bubbles for a third feature length Trailer Park Boys film entitled "Don't Legalize It" which concluded filming in late April 2013. The film was released on April 18, 2014.

In the spring of 2013, Smith, along with his Trailer Park Boys cohorts Wells and Tremblay, started Swearnet, an internet-based television network that is entirely uncensored.

== Influences ==
Smith has stated his view that Canadian humour has more in common with British humour than it does with American humour. He said "I think Canadians and Brits are willing to push the boundaries more than Americans. I'm a big fan of British stuff, I'm a big Noel Fielding fan, a big fan of League of Gentleman and I've been a Monty Python disciple since I was a kid."

== Personal life ==
For a short time in 2006, Smith was engaged to actress Nichole Hiltz after meeting on the set of Trailer Park Boys: The Movie. Smith has two children; his son, Vox is an actor who has appeared as one of the hockey kids on Trailer Park Boys and provided the voice for Mo in Trailer Park Boys: The Animated Series. His son plays "The Boy In White" in the MGM+ horror series "FROM."

In 2016, Smith was arrested in Los Angeles on suspicion of misdemeanour domestic battery. The alleged victim (who was not the person who called the police) released a statement in support of Smith, and the charges were dropped.

=== Sexual assault charge ===
On October 2, 2025, Smith was charged by the Halifax Regional Police with sexual assault relating to an incident that allegedly occurred in December 2017. As a result, a statement was released on the official Trailer Park Boys Facebook page confirming that Smith has "stepped away" from the show due to the controversy. On October 1, 2026, one year after Smith being charged and the first day of trial, the presiding Judge dismissed the charges citing lack of evidence from the Crown, after a witness refused to testify.

== Filmography ==
=== Film ===
| Year | Title | Role | Notes |
|---|---|---|---|
| 1995 | The Cart Boy | Darren | Unaired; Short film |
| 1999 | Trailer Park Boys | | |
| 2004 | A Hole in One | Lobotomy Patient | |
| 2006 | Trailer Park Boys: The Movie | Bubbles | Feature film |
| 2009 | Trailer Park Boys: Countdown to Liquor Day | Bubbles | Feature film |
| 2011 | Goon | Production Assistant 2 | Feature film |
| 2011 | Lloyd the Conqueror | Derek | Feature film |
| 2014 | Trailer Park Boys: Don't Legalize It | Bubbles | Feature film |
| 2014 | Trailer Park Boys: Live in Dublin | Bubbles | TV movie |
| 2014 | Swearnet: The Movie | Himself | Feature film |
| 2014 | Swearnet: Live | Mike Smith / Bubbles | TV movie |
| 2015 | Dude Where's My Ferret? | Bong | Short film |
| 2015 | Being Canadian | | Documentary |
| 2023 | Champions | Attorney McGurk | Feature film |
| 2024 | Standing on the Shoulders of Kitties | Bubbles | Also writer and producer |

=== Television ===
| Year | Title | Role | Notes |
|---|---|---|---|
| 2001–2026 | Trailer Park Boys | Bubbles | Main cast (seasons 1–13); 100 episodes |
| 2004 | The Trailer Park Boys Christmas Special | Bubbles / Danny | Television film |
| 2007 | CBC Winnipeg Comedy Festival | Bubbles | 1 episode |
| 2008 | Aqua Teen Hunger Force | | 1 episode |
| 2011 | The Drunk and on Drugs Happy Funtime Hour | Don Brutto / Rusty Diggins / Big Dazzie Daddle / Blaise / Liza / Jolep / Captain Mega Power / Jolep F | 6 episodes |
| 2011 | Call Me Fitz | Armin Schuller | 1 episode |
| 2012 | Archer | Mountie / Terrorist | 1 episode |
| 2014 | Epic Meal Time | Bubbles | 1 episode |
| 2014 | 24 Hour Rental | Paul | 7 episodes |
| 2014; 2016 | GGN: Snoop Dogg's Guide Double G News Network | Bubbles | 2 episodes |
| 2015 | The Playboy Morningshow | Bubbles | 1 episode |
| 2016–2017 | Trailer Park Boys: Out of the Park | Bubbles | 16 episodes |
| 2019–2020 | Trailer Park Boys: The Animated Series | Bubbles (voice) | 20 episodes |
| 2021–2025 | Trailer Park Boys: Jail | Bubbles | Also executive producer and writer |
