= List of Trailer Park Boys episodes =

Trailer Park Boys is a Canadian mockumentary television series created and directed by Mike Clattenburg and a continuation of Clattenburg's 1999 film of the same title. The series focuses on the misadventures of a group of trailer park residents, some of whom are ex-convicts, living in the fictional Sunnyvale Trailer Park in Dartmouth, Nova Scotia, Canada.

== Main series overview ==
Season	Episodes	Originally released		
Season	Episodes	First released	Last released	Network
1	6	April 22, 2001	May 27, 2001	Showcase
2	7	June 23, 2002	August 4, 2002	Showcase
3	8	April 20, 2003	June 8, 2003	Showcase
4	8	April 11, 2004	May 30, 2004	Showcase
5	10	April 17, 2005	June 19, 2005	Showcase
6	6	April 16, 2006	May 21, 2006	Showcase
7	10	April 8, 2007	June 10, 2007	Showcase
8	10	September 5, 2014		Netflix
9	10	March 27, 2015		Netflix
10	10	March 25, 2016		Netflix
11	10	March 31, 2017		Netflix
12	10	March 30, 2018		Netflix

== Episodes ==
=== Original series ===
The episodes from seasons 1 to 7 are directed by series creator Mike Clattenburg who also co-wrote every episode. John Paul Tremblay who plays Julian and Robb Wells who plays Ricky also co-wrote all episodes. Producer Barrie Dunn who also plays Ray, co-wrote all episodes during the first two seasons, as well as co-writing one season three episode. Season 6 was the last season featuring Trevor (Michael Jackson) after which, he left the show. Corey Bowles, who plays Cory, also left the show after Season 6, but returned in Season 8. Jackie Torrens, sister of cast member Jonathan Torrens, co-wrote the third-season episodes, and Michael Volpe who serves as a producer, co-wrote an episode. Mike Smith who plays Bubbles, began co-writing episodes from season four to six. Iain MacLeod, who is also a story editor, began co-writing various episodes beginning with season four, and co-wrote all season six and seven episodes. Jonathan Torrens who plays J-Roc began co-writing episodes in season five and six. Timm Hannebohm joined the writing staff in season seven, and co-wrote all episodes.

==== Season 1 (2001) ====
No. overall	No. in season	Title	Directed by	Written by	Original release date
1	1	"Take Your Little Gun and Get Out of My Trailer Park"	Mike Clattenburg	Mike Clattenburg, John Paul Tremblay, Robb Wells, Barrie Dunn	April 22, 2001
After 18 months in jail, Ricky and Julian are released from prison. Julian finds out that a man named Cyrus has taken over the park and Julian's trailer. Julian rounds up everyone from the trailer park to kick out Cyrus from Sunnyvale.
2	2	"Fuck Community College, Let's Get Drunk and Eat Chicken Fingers"	Mike Clattenburg	Mike Clattenburg, John Paul Tremblay, Robb Wells, Barrie Dunn	April 29, 2001
Julian decides to depart Sunnyvale Trailer Park and enroll in community college to finally do something productive with his life. Ricky fears that he will be lost without Julian to guide him, while Lahey worries that Ricky will cause even more trouble without Julian to keep him in check.
3	3	"Mr. Lahey's Got My Porno Tape!"	Mike Clattenburg	Mike Clattenburg, John Paul Tremblay, Robb Wells, Barrie Dunn	May 6, 2001
In desperate need of cash, Ricky and Bubbles agree to star in one of J-Roc's pornographic films. Unfortunately, the shoot is interrupted by Mr. Lahey and Randy, who confiscate the tape and use it to blackmail Ricky and Bubbles. Julian agrees to retrieve the damning evidence, and in so doing discovers that Lahey and Randy are more than just coworkers.
4	4	"Mrs. Peterson's Dog Gets Fucked Up"	Mike Clattenburg	Mike Clattenburg, John Paul Tremblay, Robb Wells, Barrie Dunn	May 13, 2001
Julian introduces his beloved neighbour, Mrs. Peterson, an elderly widow who believes Julian is her grandson. Julian agrees to mind Mrs. Peterson's dog Sparky while she undergoes surgery, but later leaves the dog with Ricky in order to run an errand. The situation quickly deteriorates when Sparky accidentally eats some of Ricky's cannabis-infused brownies, forcing the Boys to seek help from the local veterinarian, Sam Losco.
5	5	"I'm Not Gay, I Love Lucy... Wait a Second, Maybe I am Gay"	Mike Clattenburg	Mike Clattenburg, John Paul Tremblay, Robb Wells, Barrie Dunn	May 20, 2001
Weary of Lucy's continued attempts to seduce him, Julian decides to play matchmaker and convinces Ricky to marry Lucy. Providing Ricky with the means to do so, however, proves to be more complicated.
6	6	"Who The Hell Invited These Idiots To My Wedding?"	Mike Clattenburg	Mike Clattenburg, John Paul Tremblay, Robb Wells, Barrie Dunn	May 27, 2001
To ensure his plan succeeds, Julian takes over the preparations for Ricky and Lucy's wedding. In order to provide food for the wedding feast, Julian teams up with Bubbles, Cory, and Trevor to rob a local grocer.

==== Season 2 (2002) ====
No. overall	No. in season	Title	Directed by	Written by	Original release date
7	1	"What in the Fuck Happened to Our Trailer Park?"	Mike Clattenburg	Mike Clattenburg, John Paul Tremblay, Robb Wells, Barrie Dunn	June 23, 2002
After 14 months of jail time, Ricky and Julian return to find that Sunnyvale is a disaster; Randy has left Lahey and is now involved with Lucy, while Mr. Lahey is now in a constant state of depression and insobriety. Meanwhile, Julian and Ricky have a new scheme to sell cannabis to the local prison guards, which they call "Freedom 35".
8	2	"Jim Lahey Is a Drunk Bastard"	Mike Clattenburg	Mike Clattenburg, John Paul tremblay, Robb Wells, Barrie Dunn	June 30, 2002
The Boys discover that Sam Losco, having lost his veterinary practice, is now running for the position of trailer park supervisor. Realizing that Sam poses a greater threat than Mr. Lahey, the Boys decide to team up with Lahey in order to ensure that he is re-elected and reunited with Randy.
9	3	"I've Met Cats & Dogs Smarter Than Trevor & Cory!"	Mike Clattenburg	Mike Clattenburg, John Paul Tremblay, Robb Wells, Barrie Dunn	July 7, 2002
In need of money to expand their grow-op, the Boys team up with J-Roc to open an illegal bar in the trailer park. To help with the preparations, Julian enlists Cory and Trevor, who quickly prove to be more trouble than they're worth. Meanwhile, Mr. Lahey's daughter Treena (Elliot Page) comes to visit for the summer, and she quickly befriends Ricky despite her father's warnings.
10	4	"A Dope Trailer Is No Place for a Kitty!"	Mike Clattenburg	Mike Clattenburg, John Paul Tremblay, Robb Wells, Barrie Dunn	July 14, 2002
Julian and Ricky's cannabis plants become infested with spider mites. The ensuing panic ends in them burning down Bubbles' shed.
11	5	"The Bible Pimp"	Mike Clattenburg	Mike Clattenburg, John Paul Tremblay, Robb Wells, Barrie Dunn	July 21, 2002
A duo of con-artists posing as father/daughter Bible peddlers arrive in Sunnyvale. Julian eventually falls in love with the woman.
12	6	"Never Trust a Man with No Shirt On"	Mike Clattenburg	Mike Clattenburg, John Paul Tremblay, Robb Wells, Barrie Dunn	July 28, 2002
After discovering Treena's involvement with the Boys, Mr. Lahey flies into a rage that soon leads to an argument with Randy, who angrily quits. Randy then appeals to the Boys to let him join their group, before it is revealed that the argument was in fact a clever ruse to spy on their grow-op.
13	7	"The Bare Pimp Project"	Mike Clattenburg	Mike Clattenburg, John Paul Tremblay, Robb Wells, Barrie Dunn	August 4, 2002
Julian discovers that Sam Losco is engaged to Barbara Lahey, the owner of Sunnyvale. In order to ruin their relationship and prevent Sam from taking over, Julian bribes J-Roc to cast Sam in another of his low-budget adult films. Meanwhile, Julian sells their dope to the prison guards while Ricky takes his Grade-10 exam.

==== Season 3 (2003) ====
No. overall	No. in season	Title	Directed by	Written by	Original release date
14	1	"The Kiss of Freedom"	Mike Clattenburg	Mike Clattenburg, John Paul Tremblay, Robb Wells, Jackie Torrens	April 20, 2003
After 6 months in jail, Ricky and Julian are released from prison tens of thousands of dollars richer. While Julian attempts to invest his share, Ricky squanders his own, demanding a new trailer from Lahey and ordering an expensive encyclopaedia set for Trinity. When it comes time to pay however, Ricky finds he can no longer afford both and must now choose between himself and his daughter.
15	2	"Temporary Relief Assistant Trailer Park Supervisor"	Mike Clattenburg	Mike Clattenburg, John Paul Tremblay, Robb Wells, Jackie Torrens, Michael Volpe	April 27, 2003
Ricky wins the new position of Temporary Relief Assistant Trailer Park Supervisor after Randy is suspended by Barbara Lahey. Although Mr. Lahey is initially apprehensive towards his new assistant, Ricky eventually succeeds in earning his trust. Meanwhile, Julian uses the last of his money to buy a shipment of vodka from a Russian smuggler and begins a bootlegging operation in the park. With Mr. Lahey on the trail, Ricky must decide where his loyalties lie.
16	3	"If I Can't Smoke & Swear, I'm Fucked"	Mike Clattenburg	Mike Clattenburg, John Paul Tremblay, Robb Wells, Jackie Torrens	May 4, 2003
The Boys decide to forgo their usual audacious crimes in favour of smaller, less risky crimes; in the end, the Boys hope to save enough money for a cruise. The Boys start by opening an illegal gas station in Sunnyvale, using Cory and Trevor to steal their supply of illicit fuel. Meanwhile, Mr. Lahey and Randy try to catch the Boys' activities on tape.
17	4	"Who's the Microphone Assassin?"	Mike Clattenburg	Mike Clattenburg, John Paul Tremblay, Robb Wells, Jackie Torrens	May 11, 2003
The Boys decide to put on a rap concert in celebration of J-Roc's new CD, The Microphone Assassin. Things take a turn for the worse when J-Roc is caught masturbating, therefore making him the laughingstock of the park. Meanwhile, Mr. Lahey informs another rapper named "Detroit Velvet Smooth" that J-Roc is illegally performing his music, resulting in a confrontation between the two rappers.
18	5	"Closer to the Heart"	Mike Clattenburg	Mike Clattenburg, John Paul Tremblay, Robb Wells, Jackie Torrens	May 18, 2003
Canadian rock band Rush is performing in Halifax and Bubbles is eager to attend the concert. Unfortunately, Mr. Lahey purchases all the remaining tickets in an effort to get back at Ricky for his littering. Unfazed, Ricky and Julian resolve to get Bubbles into the concert by any means necessary including Ricky kidnapping Rush guitarist Alex Lifeson.
19	6	"Where in the Fuck Is Randy's Barbeque?"	Mike Clattenburg	Mike Clattenburg, John Paul Tremblay, Robb Wells, Jackie Torrens	May 25, 2003
In their latest low-profile scheme, the Boys are stealing barbecues to sell at the flea market. Julian is attracted to the mother of one of Trinity's classmates. Randy reveals the true nature of the relationship between himself and Mr. Lahey after Cory and Trevor crash Ricky's car into their trailer.
20	7	"The Delusions of Officer Jim Lahey"	Mike Clattenburg	Mike Clattenburg, John Paul Tremblay, Robb Wells, Jackie Torrens	June 1, 2003
On the anniversary of his dismissal from the police force, a drunk Mr. Lahey puts on his old uniform and even a wig in an effort to finally get the sexy time with Julian, which he longed for so long. After accidentally foiling a robbery at the liquor store, Lahey decides to take Sunnyvale law into his own hands.
21	8	"A Shit Leopard Can't Change its Spots"	Mike Clattenburg	Mike Clattenburg, John Paul Tremblay, Robb Wells, Jackie Torrens, Barrie Dunn	June 8, 2003
Ricky decides to start spending more quality time with Trinity, but his optimism is soon shattered when he discovers he does not have a ticket for the cruise. To make matters worse, Mr. Lahey evicts Ricky from the park. Angered, Ricky resolves to return to prison and begins rampaging through the town.

==== Season 4 (2004) ====
No. overall	No. in season	Title	Directed by	Written by	Original release date
22	1	"Never Cry Shitwolf"	Mike Clattenburg	Mike Clattenburg, John Paul Tremblay, Robb Wells, Mike Smith	April 11, 2004
After 9 months behind bars, Julian, Randy, and Mr. Lahey are released from jail. They discover that Ricky has become the new supervisor of Sunnyvale Trailer Park. Unbeknownst to Julian, in his absence, Ricky has started a new grow-op in his trailer. While Ray, Cory and Trevor remove the plants, Bubbles is assigned to distract Julian by any means necessary.
23	2	"A Man's Gotta Eat"	Mike Clattenburg	Mike Clattenburg, John Paul Tremblay, Robb Wells, Mike Smith, Iain MacLeod	April 18, 2004
After discovering that Ricky has been committing credit-card fraud in his name, Julian panics and leaves the trailer park for a while. Meanwhile, Randy resorts to prostitution to fund his cheeseburger addiction. Julian eventually returns and Ricky reveals that he has planted four fields of enormous cannabis plants. Faced with the prospect of so much drug money, Julian declares that they will buy Sunnyvale itself.
24	3	"Rub 'n Tiz'zug"	Mike Clattenburg	Mike Clattenburg, John Paul Tremblay, Robb Wells, Mike Smith	April 25, 2004
While the Boys are out stealing furniture for Julian, Mr. Lahey and Randy break into Ricky's trailer and discover a coded map of the Boys' cannabis fields. To throw Lahey off the scent, the Boys team up with J-Roc to open a brothel in Julian's trailer. The ruse is successful... until Cyrus shows up and demands a cut of the profits.
25	4	"The Green Bastard"	Mike Clattenburg	Mike Clattenburg, John Paul Tremblay, Robb Wells, Mike Smith	May 2, 2004
Ricky plans to have a community day in the park, featuring wrestling. An excited Bubbles becomes "The Green Bastard," a wrestler from "parts unknown." Meanwhile, Mr. Lahey must pretend he's still supervisor for the day to claim an award from a trailer-park union. The two parties inevitably collide, resulting in a tag-team wrestling match to determine the true supervisor of Sunnyvale.
26	5	"Conky"	Mike Clattenburg	Mike Clattenburg, John Paul Tremblay, Robb Wells, Mike Smith	May 9, 2004
Bubbles has an infected tooth but is afraid to go to the hospital without "Conky," a puppet he made in Grade 6 and bestowed with a caustic, malicious personality. Ricky and Julian stole Conky long ago, but now they're forced to recover it for the sake of Bubbles' health. Meanwhile, Mr. Lahey and Randy deal with Bubbles' ever-growing cat population.
27	6	"If You Love Something, Set it Free"	Mike Clattenburg	Mike Clattenburg, John Paul Tremblay, Robb Wells, Mike Smith	May 16, 2004
Something has been destroying one of the Boys' cannabis fields; after a disastrous late-night vigil with Cory and Trevor, they discover that the culprit is a cougar, now practically tame from ingesting the cannabis. Bubbles names him "Steve French" and tries to put him through rehab.
28	7	"Propane, Propane"	Mike Clattenburg	Mike Clattenburg, John Paul Tremblay, Robb Wells, Mike Smith	May 23, 2004
The Boys plan to sell their cannabis at a Snoop Dogg concert in Moncton, NB. To transport their illicit cargo, the Boys steal a propane tanker and furnish Bubbles with a fake rig license. Meanwhile, Mr. Lahey proposes remarriage to Barb in an effort to gain control of the park. Barbara declines, claiming she is marrying Ricky, and fires him and Randy. While Mr. Lahey plots his revenge on Ricky, Julian and Bubbles hear on the radio that police have found and destroyed three of their four fields, but they're diverted when a massive explosion rips through Ricky's trailer.
29	8	"Working Man"	Mike Clattenburg	Mike Clattenburg, John Paul Tremblay, Robb Wells, Mike Smith	May 30, 2004
Ricky survives Mr. Lahey's explosive attempt on his life and the Boys rush to harvest their last field before dawn. To speed up the harvest, the Boys hijack a bus and force the passengers—Rita MacNeil and her entourage—to help. When all is complete, the Boys begin the drive to Moncton, but they crash in downtown Dartmouth; a deranged Mr. Lahey has cut their brake lines. A hostile stand-off ensues between Ricky and Lahey.

==== Season 5 (2005) ====
No. overall	No. in season	Title	Directed by	Written by	Original release date
30	1	"Give Peace a Chance"	Mike Clattenburg	Mike Clattenburg, John Paul Tremblay, Robb Wells, Mike Smith, Jonathan Torrens	April 17, 2005
After a brief stint in jail, Ricky, Julian, and Bubbles return to Sunnyvale Trailer Park in style. Unfortunately, while the Boys were incarcerated, Trevor and Cory have lost the money from the previous season's grow-op, and Mr. Lahey and Randy have bought Julian's trailer after Mr. Lahey's release from a mental institution. Cory and Trevor, fearing retribution, have been granted a restraining order preventing Ricky from coming within fifty feet of them.
31	2	"The Shit Puppets"	Mike Clattenburg	Mike Clattenburg, John Paul Tremblay, Robb Wells, Mike Smith, Jonathan Torrens	April 24, 2005
Cory and Trevor start working for Julian because the restraining order prevents them from working for Ricky. Julian, Cory, and Trevor steal a large quantity of hash from Cyrus, Terry, and Dennis and hatch a plan to hide it all until they can find a buyer.
32	3	"The Fuckin' Way She Goes"	Mike Clattenburg	Mike Clattenburg, John Paul Tremblay, Robb Wells, Mike Smith, Jonathan Torrens	May 1, 2005
Ricky, Julian, and Bubbles hide all their hash by turning it into a driveway for Ray's trailer. Ray's addiction to gambling and liquor seriously worsens. Ricky barbecues for his family with devastating results.
33	4	"You Got to Blame the Thing Up Here"	Mike Clattenburg	Mike Clattenburg, John Paul Tremblay, Robb Wells, Mike Smith, Jonathan Torrens	May 8, 2005
Ricky, Julian, and Bubbles help Ray find a new home; Bubbles gets the blame for Ray's trailer burning down although Ricky actually caused it.
34	5	"Jim Lahey Is a Fuckin' Drunk and He Always Will Be"	Mike Clattenburg	Mike Clattenburg, John Paul Tremblay, Robb Wells, Mike Smith, Jonathan Torrens, Iain MacLeod	May 15, 2005
Bubbles pretends to be a spaceman when the boys steal a rocket set. Ray reveals Mr. Lahey's secret.
35	6	"Don't Cross the Shitline"	Mike Clattenburg	Mike Clattenburg, John Paul Tremblay, Robb Wells, Mike Smith, Jonathan Torrens, Iain MacLeod	May 22, 2005
Ray and Bubbles star in another of J-Roc's pornographic films, J-Roc's Greasy Trailer Park Girls Gone Wild. Lahey and Randy confiscate the tape, which contains evidence of Ray committing disability fraud.
36	7	"The Winds of Shit"	Mike Clattenburg	Mike Clattenburg, John Paul Tremblay, Robb Wells, Mike Smith, Jonathan Torrens	May 29, 2005
Ricky attempts to go back to school but lands a janitorial job at Dartmouth Regional Vocational School instead, where he begins selling hash from the driveway in an attempt to bail Ray out of prison. Meanwhile, Mr. Lahey has visions of "the winds of shit" that imply bad things will happen.
37	8	"Dressed All Over & Zesty Mordant"	Mike Clattenburg	Mike Clattenburg, John Paul Tremblay, Robb Wells, Mike Smith, Jonathan Torrens	June 5, 2005
Julian's biggest money-making scheme involves smuggling the hash using the shopping carts at a local mall. Ricky lets Trinity drive his car, 'the shitmobile.'
38	9	"I am the Liquor"	Mike Clattenburg	Mike Clattenburg, John Paul Tremblay, Robb Wells, Mike Smith, Jonathan Torrens, Iain MacLeod	June 12, 2005
Ricky bails Trinity out of jail. Mr. Lahey goes on a massive bender and tricks Cory and Trevor into telling him about the hash driveway.
39	10	"The Shit Blizzard"	Mike Clattenburg	Mike Clattenburg, John Paul Tremblay, Robb Wells, Mike Smith, Jonathan Torrens	June 19, 2005
Bailed out of jail by Randy, Cyrus and his gang head to Sunnyvale to go after Ricky, Julian, and Bubbles for getting them busted and taking their hash.

==== Season 6 (2006) ====
No. overall	No. in season	Title	Directed by	Written by	Original release date
40	1	"Way of the Road"	Mike Clattenburg	Mike Clattenburg, John Paul Tremblay, Robb Wells, Mike Smith, Jonathan Torrens, Iain MacLeod	April 16, 2006
Ray is living in his truck sleeper on an empty lot in the trailer park Stealing utilities from a neighboring trailer, he and has fallen into a habit of urinating into empty milk jugs. Randy finally has enough of Mr. Lahey's drinking and breaks up with him; Julian has a new plan to make money, and Bubbles makes plans for his kitties.
41	2	"The Cheeseburger Picnic"	Mike Clattenburg	Mike Clattenburg, John Paul Tremblay, Robb Wells, Mike Smith, Jonathan Torrens, Iain MacLeod	April 23, 2006
Randy organizes a cheeseburger picnic and invites everybody in the park. Meanwhile, a now-sober Mr. Lahey reveals a plan to Barb to pretend to be drunk to have a better chance of catching the Boys committing crimes.
42	3	"High Definition Piss Jugs"	Mike Clattenburg	Mike Clattenburg, John Paul Tremblay, Robb Wells, Mike Smith, Jonathan Torrens, Iain MacLeod	April 30, 2006
Cory and Trevor realize that they could gain valuable advertising by having their new "Convenients Store" profiled on a local news station. Bubbles does the same for his Kittyland Love Centre, but Ricky might ruin everything.
43	4	"Where in the Fuck Is Oscar Goldman?"	Mike Clattenburg	Mike Clattenburg, John Paul Tremblay, Robb Wells, Mike Smith, Jonathan Torrens, Iain MacLeod	May 7, 2006
After Bubbles loses Trinity's science project, a chicken she has raised named Oscar Goldman, Ricky and Julian must find a way to replace him; when that plan inevitably fails, they actually have to find him.
44	5	"Halloween 1977"	Mike Clattenburg	Mike Clattenburg, John Paul Tremblay, Robb Wells, Mike Smith, Jonathan Torrens, Iain MacLeod	May 14, 2006
Lahey uncovers video evidence that Ricky, Julian, and Bubbles were responsible for the events that led to him getting fired from the Police force on Halloween night 1977. Could this new evidence get him reinstated?
45	6	"Gimme My Fucking Money or Randy's Dead"	Mike Clattenburg	Mike Clattenburg, John Paul Tremblay, Robb Wells, Mike Smith, Jonathan Torrens, Iain MacLeod	May 21, 2006
Blaming Randy after getting fired from East Coast Paving, Sam Losco vengefully kidnaps him and holds him for ransom. Mr. Lahey gets reinstated as a police officer, and Bubbles convinces him to sign a peace treaty and not have the Boys arrested. Note: This episode marks the final appearance of Michael Jackson as Trevor.

==== Season 7 (2007) ====
No. overall	No. in season	Title	Directed by	Written by	Original release date
46	1	"I Fuckin' Miss Cory and Trevor"	Mike Clattenburg	Mike Clattenburg, John Paul Tremblay, Robb Wells, Iain MacLeod, Timm Hannebohm	April 8, 2007
With Cory and Trevor in a mental institution, Ricky and Julian hatch a new money-making scheme by stealing and reselling meat from the grocery store. Meanwhile, Lucy's pregnant and more demanding of Ricky. Desperate for cash, Julian takes a job delivering pizza. Ray discovers there's money to be made in scrap metal, while Bubbles resolves to stop working with the boys for good.
47	2	"I Banged Lucy and Knocked Her Up...No Big Deal"	Mike Clattenburg	Mike Clattenburg, John Paul Tremblay, Robb Wells, Iain MacLeod, Timm Hannebohm	April 15, 2007
J-Roc and his crew are cashing in by stealing luggage at the airport and selling the merchandise travelers's bring home from Europe, and Julian wants in. Ricky finally realizes he couldn't be the father of Lucy's baby and resolves to find out who she banged. No longer working with the boys, Bubbles takes up model trains as a hobby.
48	3	"Three Good Men are Dead"	Mike Clattenburg	Mike Clattenburg, John Paul Tremblay, Robb Wells, Iain MacLeod, Timm Hannebohm	April 22, 2007
Angered when Mr. Lahey doesn't finish their paperwork for search warrants against Julian and J-Roc, officers George Green and Ted Johnston attempt to kill him, Randy, and Phil Collins. Lahey hatches a scheme to have Green and Johnston arrested, but will Ray go along with it?
49	4	"Friends of the Road"	Mike Clattenburg	Mike Clattenburg, John Paul Tremblay, Robb Wells, Iain MacLeod, Timm Hannebohm	April 29, 2007
Ray and Bubbles travel to Maine to cash in on recycled shopping carts and use the opportunity to attend a nearby model train convention where famed heavy-metal singer Sebastian Bach is scheduled to appear. Things go awry when Ray gets busted for soliciting prostitution and their truck is seized, and Bubbles is left alone and stranded in a phone booth at a Bangor truck-stop. Ricky and Julian travel to Maine to rescue Bubbles, who suffers an apparent mental breakdown and steals actor Patrick Swayze's own personal model train, "The Swayzie Express". Bach is impressed with the quality of Ricky's dope.
50	5	"The Mustard Tiger"	Mike Clattenburg	Mike Clattenburg, John Paul Tremblay, Robb Wells, Iain MacLeod, Timm Hannebohm	May 6, 2007
Julian and Sebastian Bach hatch a scheme to smuggle Ricky's cannabis into the United States using Patrick Swayze's oversized model train. The Boys, now without Cory and Trevor, have to rely on Jacob and his loser friends to do their dirty work; Jacob develops an obsession with Julian and begins imitating him to the extreme.
51	6	"We Can't Call People Without Wings Angels So We Call Them Friends"	Mike Clattenburg	Mike Clattenburg, John Paul Tremblay, Robb Wells, Iain MacLeod, Timm Hannebohm	May 13, 2007
Searching the woods for Jacob and his friends after their disappearance, Ricky, Julian, and Bubbles make the grim discovery of Julian's 1987 Monte Carlo in the river, emptied and with the seat covers stripped off. A series of flashbacks show how Jacob and his friends had already escaped the car and taken out the materials needed for the model-train operation.
52	7	"Jump the Cheeseburger"	Mike Clattenburg	Mike Clattenburg, John Paul Tremblay, Robb Wells, Iain MacLeod, Timm Hannebohm	May 20, 2007
Phil Collins and Randy are busy with the final preparations before the opening of "The Dirty Burger", highlighted by a bicycle stunt in which Randy jumps over a giant cheeseburger. A dispute over money ends with Sam Losco kidnapping Phil. Jacob's hot-headed older brother Thomas arrives in Sunnyvale.
53	8	"Let the Liquor Do the Thinking"	Mike Clattenburg	Mike Clattenburg, John Paul Tremblay, Robb Wells, Iain MacLeod, Timm Hannebohm	May 27, 2007
Randy and Mr. Lahey get back together with the help of the liquor. Randy tries to break off his engagement to Lucy. Meanwhile, the news media is circulating a sketch of the suspect wanted (apparently by the FBI) for stealing the Swayzie Express, and it looks a lot like Bubbles.
54	9	"Going Off the Rails On the Swayzie Train"	Mike Clattenburg	Mike Clattenburg, John Paul Tremblay, Robb Wells, Iain MacLeod, Timm Hannebohm	June 3, 2007
The boys begin the smuggling operation. After begging Julian, Jacob is allowed to rejoin the crew, which, much to Ricky's chagrin, also includes a newly-reconstructed Conky. Although the boys are still wary of the doll, Conky makes an effort to regain their trust by buying them food for camping and saving them from being arrested by two US forest rangers (one of whom played by country singer George Canyon). At the end of the episode, while everyone else is asleep (possibly even Bubbles), Conky is seen phoning the operator and asking for the FBI, DEA and ATF.
55	10	"A Shit River Runs Through It"	Mike Clattenburg	Mike Clattenburg, John Paul Tremblay, Robb Wells, Iain MacLeod, Timm Hannebohm	June 10, 2007
The boys' plan to smuggle cannabis to Sebastian Bach in the United States concludes. As usual, things don't go quite as planned. Ricky ends up facing a difficult decision, as someone has to take the fall when the authorities show up.

=== Revival ===
Starting with season 8, Mike Clattenburg no longer directs or writes any episodes and has no formal involvement in the show after selling the rights to the trio. He is credited at the end of every episode of the revived series as "Based on the original Trailer Park Boys series produced by Mike Clattenburg, Barrie Dunn and Mike Volpe." Each episode is written by the series stars John Paul Tremblay (as JP Tremblay), Robb Wells and Mike Smith and is directed by various directors.

==== Season 8 (2014) ====
On July 4, 2013, it was announced that John Paul Tremblay, Robb Wells and Mike Smith acquired the rights to Trailer Park Boys and confirmed it would return with an eighth season, that would be broadcast on their Internet channel, SwearNet.com. However, on March 5, 2014, it was announced season 8 would premiere exclusively on Netflix, and the streaming service would also make a ninth season.

No. overall	No. in season	Title	Directed by	Written by	Original release date
56	1	"Money Can Suck My Cock"	Warren P. Sonoda	Mike Smith & JP Tremblay & Robb Wells	September 5, 2014
Julian, Ricky, and Bubbles each have new moneymaking schemes; Jim Lahey is on the verge of retiring; and Randy has a new assistant, Don (Leigh MacInnis).
57	2	"The Fuckin' V-Team"	Warren P. Sonoda	Mike Smith & JP Tremblay & Robb Wells	September 5, 2014
Julian offers to partner with Barb so she can keep the trailer park, but they need Mr. Lahey's cooperation over his deciding 1% share.
58	3	"The Dirty Dancer"	Warren P. Sonoda	Mike Smith & JP Tremblay & Robb Wells	September 5, 2014
Julian enlists J-Roc and Sarah's aid to turn his bar into a strip club. Ricky is in utter shock when he finds out that his daughter Trinity is pregnant by Jacob.
59	4	"Orangie's Pretty Fuckin' Tough"	Warren P. Sonoda	Mike Smith & JP Tremblay & Robb Wells	September 5, 2014
When Orangie, Ricky's goldfish, dies after being given too many shooters, Julian and Bubbles try to replace it with another before Ricky finds out.
60	5	"Whore-A-Geddon"	Ron Murphy	Mike Smith & JP Tremblay & Robb Wells	September 5, 2014
Local TV celebrity Steve Rogers returns and rents Julian's bar for his stag party, which gets out of hand and overflows into Bubbles's Shed-and-Breakfast sheds.
61	6	"Friends with the Benedicts"	Ron Murphy	Mike Smith & JP Tremblay & Robb Wells	September 5, 2014
Bubbles's attempts to clear up a crab infestation in his sheds and on his kitties cause him embarrassment, and he's arrested for indecent exposure.
62	7	"Community Service and a Boner Made with Love"	Cory Bowles	Mike Smith & JP Tremblay & Robb Wells	September 5, 2014
Sentenced to community service, Bubbles insists that Julian and Ricky help him with a school puppet show. The Green Bastard teaches Ricky a lesson. Portions of this episode were adapted from the plot of the Trailer Park Boys Live In Fuckin' Dublin special.
63	8	"The Super-Duper-Industrial-Bubbles-Honey-Oil-Inator"	Cory Bowles	Mike Smith & JP Tremblay & Robb Wells	September 5, 2014
When the air conditioner breaks, Bubbles has to turn his sheds into an industrial honey-oil manufacturing complex to save Ricky's weed.
64	9	"Righties Loosies, Lefties Tighties"	John Dunsworth	Mike Smith & JP Tremblay & Robb Wells	September 5, 2014
While being filmed by George Green, Bubbles gets his oil production going, aiming to make enough money to buy the trailer park for Barb and Julian.
65	10	"Crawling Through the Shitpipe"	Jay Baruchel	Mike Smith & JP Tremblay & Robb Wells	September 5, 2014
The boys sell their entire honey-oil output to Sebastian Bach, but to seal the deal for the trailer park, Ricky and Julian must each endure something truly terrible. George proves he's not as dumb as everyone says; he avoids Lahey's doublecross.

==== Season 9 (2015) ====
On March 5, 2014, it was confirmed that Netflix would air seasons 8 and 9. All episodes of season 9 were released on Netflix on March 27, 2015.

No. overall	No. in season	Title	Directed by	Written by	Original release date
66	1	"Why in the Fuck Is My Trailer Pink?"	Ron Murphy	Mike Smith & JP Tremblay & Robb Wells & Jonathan Torrens	March 27, 2015
Julian and Ricky get out of jail and return to Sunnyvale Trailer Park, but when they arrive, they find nothing is as they left it.
67	2	"A Stable Fucking Environment"	Ron Murphy	Mike Smith & JP Tremblay & Robb Wells & Jonathan Torrens	March 27, 2015
Ricky tries to keep his family together despite not being allowed back in the park, while Julian and Bubbles try to get business going again.
68	3	"Anointed in Liquor"	Ron Murphy	Mike Smith & JP Tremblay & Robb Wells & Jonathan Torrens	March 27, 2015
Julian hatches a plan to secure a place to live while Ricky and his family struggle with their new life in a barn.
69	4	"George Green: Industrial Cock Inhaler"	Jonathan Torrens	Mike Smith & JP Tremblay & Robb Wells & Jonathan Torrens	March 27, 2015
Julian and his crew have a motel auction while Ricky must track down a list full of baby items to keep his family together.
70	5	"The Motel Can't Live at the Motel"	Jonathan Torrens	Mike Smith & JP Tremblay & Robb Wells & Jonathan Torrens	March 27, 2015
Ricky brings his grandson home to the motel, but it doesn't go as planned, and Julian implements the first stage in his bid to get Sunnyvale back.
71	6	"Sweet Liquory Load"	Jonathan Torrens	Mike Smith & JP Tremblay & Robb Wells & Jonathan Torrens	March 27, 2015
J-Roc struggles with his new role as a father, and Julian's plan to get the park back earns Ricky a piece of Leslie's wrath.
72	7	"Piss"	Cory Bowles	Mike Smith & JP Tremblay & Robb Wells & Jonathan Torrens	March 27, 2015
Mr. Lahey falls off the wagon on the day of Sunnyvale's big appraisal, which Julian, Ricky and the crew do their best to ruin.
73	8	"A Dancer for Money"	Cory Bowles	Mike Smith & JP Tremblay & Robb Wells & Jonathan Torrens	March 27, 2015
Leslie puts Sunnyvale park under lock down, Julian holds an open house at the motel and Ricky has an adventure in the woods.
74	9	"Sam-Squamptches and Heli-Cocksuckers"	Warren P. Sonoda	Mike Smith & JP Tremblay & Robb Wells & Jonathan Torrens	March 27, 2015
Julian gets desperate in his attempt to reclaim Sunnyvale, Ricky finally might get his family back, and Mr. Lahey falls further off the wagon.
75	10	"The Liquor Snurf"	Warren P. Sonoda	Mike Smith & JP Tremblay & Robb Wells & Jonathan Torrens	March 27, 2015
It's morning in Sunnyvale as Julian carries out the final stage of his big reverse psychology plan to get his beloved trailer park back.

==== Season 10 (2016) ====
No. overall	No. in season	Title	Directed by	Written by	Original release date
76	1	"Freedom 45?"	Cory Bowles	Mike Smith & JP Tremblay & Robb Wells & Jonathan Torrens	March 25, 2016
While Julian celebrates the bar's success and Ricky and Lucy try for a baby, a familiar face returns from jail to shake things up at the park.
77	2	"You Want the Lot Fees? Suck Them Out of the Tip Of My Fucking Cock"	Cory Bowles	Mike Smith & JP Tremblay & Robb Wells & Jonathan Torrens	March 25, 2016
Desperate for quick cash to fight the court case, the boys try to collect outstanding lot fees at the park, and consider a return to petty crime.
78	3	"A Three Tiered Shit Dyke"	Ron Murphy	Mike Smith & JP Tremblay & Robb Wells & Jonathan Torrens	March 25, 2016
As Barb and her sidekicks try to strong-arm Mr. Lahey and Randy into testifying for her in court, the boys set out to case a fancy neighbourhood.
79	4	"Shit Covered Cave Teeth"	Ron Murphy	Mike Smith & JP Tremblay & Robb Wells & Jonathan Torrens	March 25, 2016
After handing over Trinity's wedding money, Ricky swears off crime, but Julian talks him into one last job at the Denture King offices.
80	5	"If You Don't Believe It, It's Not Real"	Jonathan Torrens	Mike Smith & JP Tremblay & Robb Wells & Jonathan Torrens	March 25, 2016
When a truck heist goes awry, the boys turn to Sam the Denture King for help. But a fight at his office quickly spirals out of control.
81	6	"All The Fuckin' Dope You Can Smoke!"	Jonathan Torrens	Mike Smith & JP Tremblay & Robb Wells & Jonathan Torrens	March 25, 2016
When Julian turns his bar into an all-inclusive casino, the ad made by Bubbles and Ricky stirs up trouble, and gets a celebrity's attention.
82	7	"Up In Smoke We Go"	Ron Murphy	Mike Smith & JP Tremblay & Robb Wells & Jonathan Torrens	March 25, 2016
A visit from Snoop Dogg and friends sets the trailer park abuzz, and Sunnyvale fan Tom Arnold fulfills a bucket-list dream with Bubbles.
83	8	"The Super Bling Cowboy"	Ron Murphy	Mike Smith & JP Tremblay & Robb Wells & Jonathan Torrens	March 25, 2016
Bubbles battles a bad case of nerves at his open mic gig, and Lucy weighs a startling offer from Tom Arnold.
84	9	"Thugged Out Gangsta Shit"	Bobby Farrelly	Mike Smith & JP Tremblay & Robb Wells & Jonathan Torrens	March 25, 2016
Tom sets out on an adventure with Lucy, while Snoop tries Ricky's new concoction and Mr. Lahey plots a diabolical mission.
85	10	"Looks Like The Liquor Wins"	Bobby Farrelly	Mike Smith & JP Tremblay & Robb Wells & Jonathan Torrens	March 25, 2016
Still shaken up, the gang gets ready for Trinity and Jacob's wedding. Meanwhile, Barb struggles with a big decision about the park. Note: This episode marks the final appearances of Lucy DeCoutere as Lucy and Jonathan Torrens as J-Roc.

==== Season 11 (2017) ====
No. overall	No. in season	Title	Directed by	Written by	Original release date
86	1	"The Jack Your Cock Furry Whore Slut"	Cory Bowles	Mike Smith & JP Tremblay & Robb Wells	March 31, 2017
Bubbles and Ricky are doing well with their new pizza sauce company, but a new opportunity arises when they get a tip on where Julian's been living.
87	2	"The Walker Zombley"	Cory Bowles	Mike Smith & JP Tremblay & Robb Wells	March 31, 2017
Ricky mistakes a sick-looking Jacob for a "zombley" and Bubbles thinks he's an alien. The boys make Cory and Jacob steal "fertilizer" from a farmer.
88	3	"My Fucking Balls, My Cock, My Hole, or My Tits?"	Bobby Farrelly	Mike Smith & JP Tremblay & Robb Wells	March 31, 2017
When Mo shoots Ricky in the groin, the boys argue over what medical attention, if any, he should have.
89	4	"Darth Lahey"	Bobby Farrelly	Mike Smith & JP Tremblay & Robb Wells	March 31, 2017
Ricky must stay behind and look after Mo while Julian and Bubbles go lobster fishing. Lahey warns Ricky that the cops are out to get him.
90	5	"Flight of the Bumblecock"	Warren P. Sonoda	Mike Smith & JP Tremblay & Robb Wells	March 31, 2017
Ricky has a meltdown trying to process the information he learned from Lahey. The boys have to get Bubbles' truck back from George Green.
91	6	"How Do You Keep Your Bag So Soft?"	Warren P. Sonoda	Mike Smith & JP Tremblay & Robb Wells	March 31, 2017
Ricky's injury isn't healing properly, so the boys head back to see Sam Losco. Ricky takes drastic action when the power gets shut off at the rink.
92	7	"I Look Like A Fucking Dick!!"	John Dunsworth	Mike Smith & JP Tremblay & Robb Wells	March 31, 2017
Julian sends Lahey and Ricky off on a golf outing that leads to a confrontation. NHL superstar Nathan MacKinnon visits the hockey-school kids.
93	8	"A Liquor Captain Never Abandons A Sinking Shit Ship"	Cory Bowles	Mike Smith & JP Tremblay & Robb Wells	March 31, 2017
A "free weed" sign draws a bunch of stoners to the shipping container, where the boys face off with Lahey, Randy, and a pair of cops.
94	9	"Oh, My Fuck Boys, We Killed Lahey & Randy"	Ron Murphy	Mike Smith & JP Tremblay & Robb Wells	March 31, 2017
The boys' deal with Snoop Dogg hits a snag when they're accused of killing Lahey and Randy, then everything goes haywire with Cory and Jacob.
95	10	"The All You Can Eat Shit Buffet"	Ron Murphy	Mike Smith & JP Tremblay & Robb Wells	March 31, 2017
All hell breaks loose on the ocean as the boys prepare for the drop-off while trying to find Bubbles and avoid Lahey and Randy.

==== Season 12 (2018) ====
No. overall	No. in season	Title	Directed by	Written by	Original release date
96	1	"Chlamydia"	Ron Murphy	Mike Smith & JP Tremblay & Robb Wells	March 30, 2018
Bubbles's new brewing business is taking off, but things aren't going well for Julian and even worse for Ricky, who claims he has a big announcement.
97	2	"Godspeed My Muscular Friend"	Ron Murphy	Mike Smith & JP Tremblay & Robb Wells	March 30, 2018
In an attempt to go legit, Julian looks for a job at the mall and Ricky becomes a handyman. Lahey and Randy head to the racetrack.
98	3	"The Cunt Word"	Bobby Farrelly	Mike Smith & JP Tremblay & Robb Wells	March 30, 2018
Julian runs a side hustle at his security job. Ricky sends Jacob and Trinity to his car when he hosts Susan for a romantic dinner that turns chaotic.
99	4	"All The Shit I Need"	Bobby Farrelly	Mike Smith & JP Tremblay & Robb Wells	March 30, 2018
Bubs loses it when Ricky "borrows" the truck to deal with a rat problem in the park, then lends it to Julian as part of another racket at the mall.
100	5	"Happy Birthday Bubbles"	Cory Bowles	Mike Smith & JP Tremblay & Robb Wells	March 30, 2018
The boys cause a panic in the park when a stunt they organize for Bubbles's birthday goes a bit haywire. Julian puts his job in jeopardy.
101	6	"Flow Me The Money"	Cory Bowles	Mike Smith & JP Tremblay & Robb Wells	March 30, 2018
The boys learn that the prosecutor for Julian's trial is his ex. Ricky steps in to represent Julian in court after another plan goes awry.
102	7	"Big Cock"	Bruce McCulloch	Mike Smith & JP Tremblay & Robb Wells	March 30, 2018
Ricky and Julian help Bubbles fill a huge order of his new beer, Freedom 35, but a secret Ricky's been keeping could derail the delivery.
103	8	"Will You For To Be Fucking Married To Me?"	Bruce McCulloch	Mike Smith & JP Tremblay & Robb Wells	March 30, 2018
Lahey tries to squeeze his way into the beer business. Ricky and Susan's fighting prevents Candy from getting a private moment with Julian.
104	9	"Angel Shit Sent Down From Jesus God"	Ron Murphy	Mike Smith & JP Tremblay & Robb Wells	March 30, 2018
When a big beer company wants to work with the boys, they need to come up with $50,000 to close the deal—and Ricky has an idea that could pay off.
105	10	"Fuckin' Fucked Out Of Our Fuckin Minds"	Ron Murphy	Mike Smith & JP Tremblay & Robb Wells	March 30, 2018
Bubbles organizes a huge stag party for Julian and Ricky, but when they hear police sirens approaching, it turns into an escape operation.

==== Season 13 (2026) ====
Upcoming

== Specials and webisodes ==
=== Specials ===
Title	Directed by	Written by	Original release date
"The Cart Boy (1995)"	Mike Clattenburg	Mike Clattenburg, John Paul Tremblay, Robb Wells	Unaired
A short film about the "Cart Boy" who later became Bubbles in Trailer Park Boys. Also features Ricky and Jason (who later became Julian) as security guards. The short never aired, but was included in the Season 1 & 2 DVD as a hidden Easter egg. Note: Jason is referred to as having the last name "Peterson." This is consistent with the episode of Trailer Park Boys featuring Mrs. Peterson.
"One Last Shot (1998)"	Mike Clattenburg	Mike Clattenburg, John Paul Tremblay, Robb Wells	October 30, 2017
Robb Wells, John Paul Tremblay and John Dunsworth appeared together for the very first time in this short film. While the characters share similar attributes, the short is not canon to the rest of the series. It is the story of two best friends, Rob and GW (or Gary William). Rob is preparing to leave their home town and has a secret to share with GW. He is nervous about it and they spend the evening drinking and partying at a number of establishments before he gets the courage to reveal the secret. The film was recorded in 1998, but wasn't released to the public until October 30, 2017, when it was made available to premium members of Swearnet.com in the wake of John Dunsworth's death. It was subsequently made available on Netflix.
"Dear Santa Claus, Go Fuck Yourself"	Mike Clattenburg	Mike Clattenburg, Barrie Dunn, Iain MacLeod, Mike Smith, Jonathan Torrens, John Paul Tremblay, Michael Volpe, Robb Wells	December 12, 2004
This special is set in 1997 before Randy was Assistant Trailer Park Supervisor, before J-Roc and Tyrone were "urbanized," before Barb and Jim broke up, before the Shitmobile lost a door, and before Lahey was an alcoholic. Ricky tries to win back Lucy, and Julian runs a stolen Christmas gift racket Note: The DVD release refers to this as "Xmas Special" on the box. Also titled "Xmas Special" on Netflix's TV streaming service.
"Hearts of Dartmouth: Life of a Trailer Park Girl"	Annemarie Cassidy	Annemarie Cassidy, Karen Wentzell	March 5, 2006
Behind-the-scenes look at the making of Trailer Park Boys. Directed and narrated by Annemarie Cassidy, then-wife of Mike Clattenburg.
"Trailer Park Boys 101"	Adamm Liley	Adamm Liley, Sarah Byrne	April 8, 2007
Canadian rock band Rush's guitarist Alex Lifeson narrates this insider tour of the world of the Trailer Park Boys. This special is packed with clips from the first six seasons as well as producer and cast interviews.
"Say Goodnight to the Bad Guys"	Mike Clattenburg	Mike Clattenburg, Timm Hannebohm	December 7, 2008
It has been one year since the boys' successful "train ride" in Maine at the conclusion of Season 7, and Julian has been sitting on the money to avoid arousing suspicion. Ricky and Bubbles think they are about to become rich, but Jim Lahey is back on the liquor and looking to thwart their plans yet again. Working in cahoots with Lahey and Randy, Sam Losco ambushes the boys on the eve of doling out the cash, and the money is lost forever. Ray is back living at the dump and running a bootleg liquor operation, the boys are penniless once again, and Ricky must come to terms with Randy's relationship with Lucy and Baby Randy. Determined to finally make the park respectable, Lahey hatches a greasy plan to set the boys up and get them sent to jail yet again. The plan involves a singles dance, dope, bootleg liquor, and bologna sandwiches, but Julian sees an opportunity to screw Lahey over and steal all the proceeds. Lahey's plan works when the police arrive and arrest the boys, Ray, Lucy, Trinity, J-Roc, Tyrone, Jacob and Cyrus. In the end, a long list of characters vow revenge against Jim Lahey once they get out of jail.
"Live in Fuckin' Dublin"	Mike Smith, John Paul Tremblay, Robb Wells	Mike Smith, John Paul Tremblay, Robb Wells	June 1, 2014
The boys head to Ireland after winning a contest to see Rush but are arrested by Immigration and must perform a community service puppet show.
"Live at the North Pole"	Mike Smith, John Paul Tremblay, Robb Wells	Mike Smith, John Paul Tremblay, Robb Wells	November 15, 2014
When Julian's latest scheme goes awry, the boys must to travel to the North Pole, i.e., Minneapolis, to do a raucous live show. But boozy Lahey wants to spoil it all. Can Bubbles save the day? And what's that stain on the Ghost of Christmas Past?
"Drunk, High and Unemployed (Live in Austin)"	Mike Smith, John Paul Tremblay, Robb Wells, Gary Howsam	Mike Smith, John Paul Tremblay, Robb Wells	December 9, 2015
Ricky, Julian and Bubbles bring their trailer park humor out onto the stage for a night of liquor, schemes and an intoxicated acting demo. The boys are at it again in the southern state of Texas. Bubbles is auditioning for a movie in Austin, Texas and brings the boys with him. A whole lot of alcohol, drugs and shenanigans await them live on stage.
"Live at Red Rocks"	Mike Smith, John Paul Tremblay, Robb Wells, Gary Howsam	Mike Smith, John Paul Tremblay, Robb Wells	December 25, 2020
Ricky, Julian, Bubbles, Lahey and Randy take to the stage of the legendary Red Rocks Amphitheatre for a night of greasy fun, fights, and a few home truths! Featuring John Dunsworth's final performance.

=== Webisodes ===
==== Season 7.5 (2014) ====
Leading up to the premiere of season 8, six short web clip episodes were made available for their website, called Season 7.5.

No.	Title	Written by	Original release date
1	"Help Me Blow Up The Tubey Thing"	John Paul Tremblay, Robb Wells, Mike Smith	September 1, 2014
Ricky and Julian promised Bubbles they'd play space today. But Ricky has a major fucking situation on his hands and needs to blow up something bigger than a rocket!
2	"I Can't Take That Fucking Thing Down With a Gallon of Gas!!!!"	John Paul Tremblay, Robb Wells, Mike Smith	September 2, 2014
Ricky, Julian and Bubbles head to the "tubey" thing to blow that cocksucker up. Yeah boys, try to look invisible so the fucking cops don't see you...
3	"Heights And Measurlents"	John Paul Tremblay, Robb Wells, Mike Smith	September 3, 2014
How the fuck are the boys gonna blow up a 100-foot high silo with a gallon of gas? Don't worry, Bubbles will make some calculations....
4	"A Tree's Not Scared of Your Ax"	John Paul Tremblay, Robb Wells, Mike Smith	September 3, 2014
"Ricky, if I die trying to get this fucking weed silo down, I'm gonna fucking kill you..."
5	"10, 9, 8, 6, 5, 4, 3, 2, 1..."	John Paul Tremblay, Robb Wells, Mike Smith	September 4, 2014
Will she blow, boys... or has Bubbles fucked up his calculations?!
6	"I Can't Believe the Zonkey Is Real"	John Paul Tremblay, Robb Wells, Mike Smith	September 4, 2014
Fuck blowing shit up, let's go to the zoo and look for this supposed "zonkey" thing...

==== Season 8.5 (2014–15) ====
No.	Title	Written by	Original release date
1	"Today Is Jim Lahey's Last Day On Planet Of The Earth"	John Paul Tremblay, Robb Wells, Mike Smith	December 10, 2014
Ricky, Julian and Bubbles are back in jail, trying to cope in their own ways. Bubbles is fixing shitty toasters, Julian is working on a money-making scheme... and Ricky is plotting to murder Jim Lahey!
2	"Shit Shank"	John Paul Tremblay, Robb Wells, Mike Smith	December 19, 2014
Bubbles has a major fucking problem! If he doesn't help Lahey defend himself against Ricky, the Sunnyvale shit walkers are coming for him...
3	"Black Handled Multi Driver"	John Paul Tremblay, Robb Wells, Mike Smith	December 31, 2014
It's all going to shit in jail! Randy prepares to break bad news to Lahey, and Bubbles' day is about to get very fucky indeed...
4	"Gorilla Fingers"	John Paul Tremblay, Robb Wells, Mike Smith	January 7, 2015
Bubbles takes a traumatic trip to the examination room, and Mr. Lahey finally confronts Ricky and his shit-shank!
5	"Key Add Board"	John Paul Tremblay, Robb Wells, Mike Smith	January 14, 2015
Ricky does some book learning while his ass recovers from the multi-driver mishap, and Julian involves Bubbles further in his moneymaking scheme. And this time, Julian's venture really is GREASY!
6	"Clear Brotes and Baked Parunies"	John Paul Tremblay, Robb Wells, Mike Smith	January 21, 2015
Randy takes Don out for fine North American dining at "The King", and prepares to deliver some big news. Meanwhile in jail, the boys are being forced to chow down on fucking lettuce!
7	"Get The Crumbs Off Benatar"	John Paul Tremblay, Robb Wells, Mike Smith	January 28, 2015
Ricky's spent a week getting fucked over in solitary and he's come out a different man! Meanwhile, Randy has some great news for Mr. Lahey.
8	"Fuck Off, Fuck You, and You Can Suck It"	John Paul Tremblay, Robb Wells, Mike Smith	February 4, 2015
Bubbles interrupts Ricky and Julian's epic Pong game to talk about his interview for the Early Release program. Will he be following Lahey out the jail gates, and back to Sunnyvale?
9	"Ping Pang Pong"	John Paul Tremblay, Robb Wells, Mike Smith	February 11, 2015
Bubbles fucks up Ricky and Julian's Pong game because he has big news! Meanwhile, J-Roc and T pay Julian a visit to talk about his favourite subject, $CRILLA...
10	"Sober Living and The Ten Nugget Deal"	John Paul Tremblay, Robb Wells, Mike Smith	February 18, 2015
Jim Lahey meets someone that could change his life, and Ricky gets a hot phone call from Lucy. Meanwhile, Randy picks up more than chicken nuggets during his visit to "The King"...
11	"Eons and the Swede"	John Paul Tremblay, Robb Wells, Mike Smith	February 25, 2015
J-Roc takes Bubbles to get new swag, and Jim Lahey's new friend is helping him on the path to sober living.
12	"You Can't Go To Jail When You're In Jail"	John Paul Tremblay, Robb Wells, Mike Smith	March 4, 2015
Everyone is busy making plans! Bubbles is back in the park and working on a new business; Julian is trying out his psychological tricks; Ricky wants to make a new start with his family. And Lahey is working on some BIG fucking plans...
13	"What the Fuck is Going On?"	John Paul Tremblay, Robb Wells, Mike Smith	March 11, 2015
Bubbles visits Ricky and Julian in jail and gets into trouble over his Eon's spending spree. Ricky tries to talk Julian out of reading his 'stupid fucking brain books'. And Sarah has a proposal for Donna!
14	"Whoever Misses First Loses"	John Paul Tremblay, Robb Wells, Mike Smith	March 18, 2015
Bubbles is worried about new developments in the park – what the fuck is happening to Sunnyvale? Ricky and Julian go in front of the parole board and reveal their plans for a crime-free future. And who will finally be declared Pong champion?

== Spin-offs ==
=== Trailer Park Boys: Out of the Park: Europe (2016) ===
Set in-between the events of Seasons 10 and 11, this mini-series was released on Netflix. Official description: "The Trailer Park Boys are thrilled to get a free trip to Europe, until they arrive and learn about their corporate sponsor's unusual requirements."

No.	Title	Written by	Original release date
1	"London"	John Paul Tremblay, Robb Wells, Mike Smith	October 28, 2016
The boys are excited to arrive in London until they learn they must execute weird tasks to earn spending money. First up: steal the queen's underwear.
2	"Berlin"	John Paul Tremblay, Robb Wells, Mike Smith	October 28, 2016
The boys head to Berlin, where they must perform the "Chicken Dance" wearing lederhosen, take nude sunbathing selfies, and run in the Berlin Marathon.
3	"Copenhagen"	John Paul Tremblay, Robb Wells, Mike Smith	October 28, 2016
In the capital of Denmark, the boys must climb into the boxing ring with a heavyweight champion and tour the city sporting a conspicuous sex device.
4	"Oslo"	John Paul Tremblay, Robb Wells, Mike Smith	October 28, 2016
In Oslo, the boys are ordered to give an "atomic hover wedgie" to a cherished landmark and escort a local celebrity on a date to an ice bar.
5	"Stockholm"	John Paul Tremblay, Robb Wells, Mike Smith	October 28, 2016
In Stockholm, the boys must eat a gut-busting meal of Swedish meatballs and fermented herring without barfing and make a save against a hockey legend.
6	"Helsinki"	John Paul Tremblay, Robb Wells, Mike Smith	October 28, 2016
In a visit to Finland the boys meet the real Santa Claus, sing karaoke in a taxi, deliver a weather report, and try their hands at ice sculpture.
7	"Amsterdam – Part 1"	John Paul Tremblay, Robb Wells, Mike Smith	October 28, 2016
The boys sport culturally-traditional footwear, ride a three-person bicycle, and visit a coffee shop while touring the capital of the Netherlands.
8	"Amsterdam – Part 2"	John Paul Tremblay, Robb Wells, Mike Smith	October 28, 2016
Still in Amsterdam, the boys meet and have a sing-along with Stephen Stills and Graham Nash, then visit a lady of the night in the red light district.

=== Trailer Park Boys: Out of the Park: USA (2017) ===
This mini-series was released on Netflix between Seasons 11 and 12. Official description: "The boys are back on the loose as Bubbles, Julian and Ricky head south of the Canadian border for some outrageous American adventures."

No.	Title	Written by	Original release date
1	"Orlando 1"	John Paul Tremblay, Robb Wells, Mike Smith	November 24, 2017
After finding out that Bubs misread the fine print about their hotel situation, the boys head to the astronaut training program at NASA.
2	"Orlando 2"	John Paul Tremblay, Robb Wells, Mike Smith	November 24, 2017
Still in Orlando, Bubbles and the boys go to a big cat park. Ricky attempts to wrestle an alligator and Julian takes the boys off-roading.
3	"Charlotte"	John Paul Tremblay, Robb Wells, Mike Smith	November 24, 2017
The boys get to their hotel in Charlotte 45 minutes before checkout time. They find out their task for the day: reach a ground speed of 200 mph.
4	"New Orleans"	John Paul Tremblay, Robb Wells, Mike Smith	November 24, 2017
In New Orleans, the boys take on a giant pile of seafood, Julian visits a psychic, Ricky looks for a doctor, and Bubs sleeps in a cemetery.
5	"Memphis"	John Paul Tremblay, Robb Wells, Mike Smith	November 24, 2017
Ricky has an unfortunate accident when the boys get to Memphis. Then, they meet Rush guitarist Alex Lifeson, who helps Bubbles record a song.
6	"Nashville"	John Paul Tremblay, Robb Wells, Mike Smith	November 24, 2017
The boys arrive in Nashville. Bubbles shops for a suit to wear in his new music video, while Ricky and Julian look for a car and some girls.
7	"Los Angeles 1"	John Paul Tremblay, Robb Wells, Mike Smith	November 24, 2017
Ricky gets into a pot-smoking competition with "Anthony Stoner" aka Tommy Chong in LA. Later, the boys try to play basketball to win some money.
8	"Los Angeles 2"	John Paul Tremblay, Robb Wells, Mike Smith	November 24, 2017
The boys wrap up the trip in LA as they finally shoot the music video with the help of famous friends Sebastian Bach, Tom Green and Verne Troyer. Note this is Verne Troyer's final television appearance during his lifetime before his death in April 2018

=== Trailer Park Boys: The Animated Series (2019–2020) ===
==== Season 1 (2019) ====
No.	Title	Written by	Original release date
1	"Long Story Short... A Bear Ripped My Cock Off and Ate It"	John Paul Tremblay, Robb Wells, Mike Smith, Norm Hiscock, Michael Rowe	March 31, 2019
Back in jail, tripping on mushrooms and transformed into cartoons, the boys test the limits of their new reality with both fear and excitement.
2	"The Pepperoni Cobra"	John Paul Tremblay, Robb Wells, Mike Smith, Norm Hiscock, Michael Rowe	March 31, 2019
A tapeworm is taking the grub right out of Ricky's mouth, but when the parasite swipes his weed, that's the last straw. Bubbles connects at the club.
3	"The Stanley Bong"	John Paul Tremblay, Robb Wells, Mike Smith, Norm Hiscock, Michael Rowe	March 31, 2019
Bubbles convinces Julian and Ricky to join him as he stalks Wayne Gretzky. Now they must beat the Moncton Mudslides to win back the Stanley Bong.
4	"The Penis Milker"	John Paul Tremblay, Robb Wells, Mike Smith, Norm Hiscock, Michael Rowe	March 31, 2019
The boys go on a mission to save a mountain lion friend, but they don't count on the mosquitoes, bear traps or sperm-harvesting backwoods locals.
5	"Big Ho's Carwash"	John Paul Tremblay, Robb Wells, Mike Smith, Norm Hiscock, Michael Rowe	March 31, 2019
Business and chaos boom as Julian revs up a sexy car wash, Ricky opens a trailer pool, and Bubbles builds his dream shed on a TV show.
6	"The Three Mustardteers"	John Paul Tremblay, Robb Wells, Mike Smith, Norm Hiscock, Michael Rowe	March 31, 2019
Old-school hash brings back memories of grade school, when young Julian, Ricky and Bubbles met, smoked and retaliated against a bully with a pellet gun.
7	"Satan's Bastards"	John Paul Tremblay, Robb Wells, Mike Smith, Norm Hiscock, Michael Rowe	March 31, 2019
Trinity and Jacob want to move, so the boys deliver hash to raise cash. But Ricky gets greedy and incurs the wrath of a rampaging biker gang.
8	"Space Weed"	John Paul Tremblay, Robb Wells, Mike Smith, Norm Hiscock, Michael Rowe	March 31, 2019
When Ricky's grow operations are exposed, an entrepreneur approaches him to cultivate dope in space. Beyond pumped, Bubbles demands to join the team.
9	"Hurricane Ricky"	John Paul Tremblay, Robb Wells, Mike Smith, Norm Hiscock, Michael Rowe	March 31, 2019
To get off the grid, Ricky liberates hundreds of car batteries. Julian concocts a scheme to ride out a big storm, but Mother Nature has other plans.
10	"Trailerstock"	John Paul Tremblay, Robb Wells, Mike Smith, Norm Hiscock, Michael Rowe	March 31, 2019
The boys throw a benefit concert featuring Helix to save Sunnyvale. But how can their event compete with the nearby Queens of the Stone Age show?

==== Season 2 (2020) ====
No.	Title	Written by	Original release date
1	"Duber"	John Paul Tremblay, Robb Wells, Mike Smith, Norm Hiscock, Michael Rowe	May 22, 2020
Ride-sharing hits a new high when Ricky attempts to go legit with a dope-smoking twist on Uber: Duber. But can the gang handle success — and Randy?
2	"Viral Video"	John Paul Tremblay, Robb Wells, Mike Smith, Norm Hiscock, Michael Rowe	May 22, 2020
The viral video cash-in is on. Ricky kidnaps a rank clown for Mo’s birthday party. But when the bozo bails, Cory and Randy step up as party starters.
3	"The Tax Man F**ked Me"	John Paul Tremblay, Robb Wells, Mike Smith, Norm Hiscock, Michael Rowe	May 22, 2020
Sunnyvale’s sketchiest get scammed by grifters posing as tax agents. A trap is set, then lethal farts lead the boys to a familiar face.
4	"Scamazon"	John Paul Tremblay, Robb Wells, Mike Smith, Norm Hiscock, Michael Rowe	May 22, 2020
Bubbles pours his life savings into Kitty Shakes while Julian and Ricky drive off to steal packages. Later, a reality competition comes calling.
5	"Clint Eatswood"	John Paul Tremblay, Robb Wells, Mike Smith, Norm Hiscock, Michael Rowe	May 22, 2020
The gang must rustle up dough to cure Bubbles’s kitten of hookworms, even if that means becoming movie stars. But are the boys ready to play dirty?
6	"The First Time We Smoked Weed"	John Paul Tremblay, Robb Wells, Mike Smith, Norm Hiscock, Michael Rowe	May 22, 2020
The fellas take a shady trip down memory lane back to 1979: the first time they smoked Panama Red — and launched a life of petty crime.
7	"Bubbles for Mayor"	John Paul Tremblay, Robb Wells, Mike Smith, Norm Hiscock, Michael Rowe	May 22, 2020
The city rounds up Bubbles’s free-range kitties, and when the mayor kicks him to the curb, he decides to run for office. One paradigm shift coming up.
8	"The Bagshank Redemption"	John Paul Tremblay, Robb Wells, Mike Smith, Norm Hiscock, Michael Rowe	May 22, 2020
After going to jail for peeing on the cops, Ricky claims he’s turning over a new leaf. That means ditching his pals to go on a Costco treasure hunt.
9	"The F**ket List"	John Paul Tremblay, Robb Wells, Mike Smith, Norm Hiscock, Michael Rowe	May 22, 2020
Bubbles drags Julian to the fair to cheer him up. After a fortuneteller delivers the bad news, the guys end up in a cult. Time to start drinking.
10	"Well Boys, I Guess I Gotta Get Dead"	John Paul Tremblay, Robb Wells, Mike Smith, Norm Hiscock, Michael Rowe	May 22, 2020
The good times are killing them: A bank error in their favor sends the boys on a spending spree. When the cops arrive, Ricky must fake his own death.

=== Trailer Park Boys: Jail (2021) ===
No. in season	Title	Directed by	Written by	Original release date
1	"I Wish I Had A 65 Inch Cock"	Bruce McCulloch	Mike Smith, JP Tremblay, Robb Wells	January 1, 2021
Guess what - Ricky and Julian are back in jail. But that's OK, jail's cool and the Boys are ready to get fucked up and high! But there's one BIG problem. Can Julian figure this one out?
2	"Red, Raw Arseholes"	Bruce McCulloch	Mike Smith, JP Tremblay, Robb Wells	January 7, 2021
Julian's about to clean up with his new money-making scheme, but can Bubbles deliver the goods? Meanwhile, a desperate Ricky and Terry attempt to get high as fuck, any way they can.
3	"Alright Lungs, Prepare To Blow A Load"	Bruce McCulloch	Mike Smith, JP Tremblay, Robb Wells	January 14, 2021
Ricky's horny as fuck and ready to bang his new lady, Julian is worried about Terry's influence, and Bubbles comes up with a colourful plan to deliver supplies. But things are about to blow up like a balloon mongoose...
4	"Goddamn Weed And Scrotums"	Bruce McCulloch	Mike Smith, JP Tremblay, Robb Wells	January 21, 2021
The Sunnyvale Correctional Facility has a crazy new inmate - and he's got the best hash in town. Ricky and Terry hatch a plan to get a big lungful of that sweet Temple Ball smoke.
5	"Hardcore Gay Porno Video DJ"	Bruce McCulloch	Mike Smith, JP Tremblay, Robb Wells	January 28, 2021
Bubbles and Randy are looking forward to an old-fashioned sleepover, with comfy jammies and a Brad Pitt movie. But all hell is breaking loose in the Sunnyvale Correctional Facility, and Julian and Ricky need some big favours, fast. Bubbles' day is about to get GREASY!
6	"RASH"	Bruce McCulloch	Mike Smith, JP Tremblay, Robb Wells	February 4, 2021
Bubbles gets some bad news - are his hopes and dreams fackin' dashed? But on the upside, the Sunnyvale Correctional Facility has a new inmate, and he knows how to get things done...
7	"The Bionic Burnout"	Bruce McCulloch	Mike Smith, JP Tremblay, Robb Wells	February 11, 2021
Alex Lifeson left Ricky a gift under his pillow, but someone else got there first! Can the Boys figure out who, with the help of Terry's fucked-up ear? Meanwhile, Randy makes a difficult decision, but a man's gotta eat...
8	"Freddy Gets Fingered"	Bruce McCulloch	Mike Smith, JP Tremblay, Robb Wells	February 18, 2021
Sunnyvale Correctional Facility's warden is back in town - and he's not fucking around! Can Julian dance his way out of this one with the help of Cory and Jacob? Meanwhile, it's Smokey's first day back on the job, but does anyone wanna party?
9	"Too Fucked Up Even For Jail"	Bruce McCulloch	Mike Smith, JP Tremblay, Robb Wells	February 25, 2021
Julian and the Roc-Pile learn the hard way that there's a big difference between 'get' and 'got'. And there's another problem - Julian and Ricky have an interview with the parole board...
10	"Shoot For The Clouds"	Bruce McCulloch	Mike Smith, JP Tremblay, Robb Wells	March 4, 2021
Bubbles is in danger - can Terry hold off the angry mob until Ricky and Julian figure out a plan? Bubbles is a dead man if he don't give up the hash, man!

==== Trailer Park Boys: Jail Shorts (2021) ====
No.	Title	Directed by	Written by	Original release date
1	"Greatest Fucking Day Of The Week"	Mike Smith, JP Tremblayy, Robb Wells	Mike Smith, JP Tremblay, Robb Wells	March 11, 2021
It's Chicken Finger Day in the jail canteen and Ricky's excited as fuck! No-one gets between him and his beloved chicken fingers (the good kind). Or do they?
2	"My Fucking Arm, It Ate It"	Mike Smith, JP Tremblay, Robb Wells	Mike Smith, JP Tremblay, Robb Wells	March 18, 2021
Ricky vs. a pepperoni vending machine. Who do you think's gonna win?
3	"Think Like Warren Buffett"	Mike Smith, JP Tremblay, Robb Wells	Mike Smith, JP Tremblay, Robb Wells	March 25, 2021
Julian's making some serious cash - he's got what people need, and boy do they fucking need it! Because when you gotta go...
4	"Snacks For A Week"	Mike Smith, JP Tremblay, Robb Wells	Mike Smith, JP Tremblay, Robb Wells	April 1, 2021
The stakes (and Doritos) are high as Ricky, Julian and Bubbles play 'What The Fuck Did He Do To Get In Jail'. Who's gonna be feasting on noodle soup and crackers tonight?
5	"I'll Fuck With A Piece Of Cake"	Mike Smith, JP Tremblay, Robb Wells	Mike Smith, JP Tremblay, Robb Wells	April 8, 2021
There's a big surprise for Bubbles, with cake, chips and condom balloons. But Ricky has one more treat... prepare for takeoff!
6	"Home Is Where You're Bloomed"	Dave Lawrence	Mike Smith, JP Tremblay, Robb Wells	April 15, 2021
While Terry is showing the crew some badass moves, he discovers a secret. Has he found fucking freedom... or something else?
7	"A Gorilla With His Banana"	Mike Smith, JP Tremblay, Robb Wells	Mike Smith, JP Tremblay, Robb Wells	April 22, 2021
Gorilla Fingers gets to grips with the delicate subject of STDs. It's a dirty frigging job, but someone's gotta do it!
8	"Home Sweet Fuckin Home"	Dave Lawrence	Immanuela Lawrence	April 29, 2021
Terry builds a sweet little house for his new buddy. Fuck's sake Terry, ya softie! But like they say, home is the heart of the universe!
9	"Horrible Fuckin News"	Mike Smith, JP Tremblay, Robb Wells	Mike Smith, JP Tremblay, Robb Wells	May 6, 2021
Ricky's been to the infirmary and has some bad news to share with Julian and Bubbles...
10	"It'd Be Easier If They Put A Cock On The King"	Mike Smith, JP Tremblay, Robb Wells	Mike Smith, JP Tremblay, Robb Wells	May 13, 2021
Bubbles gives Ricky a masterclass in chess for the jail tournament. Rule #1 - there's no fucking dice in chess! It's gonna be a long evening...
11	"The Red Must Be The Blue"	Mike Smith, JP Tremblay, Robb Wells	Mike Smith, JP Tremblay, Robb Wells	May 20, 2021
Ricky has given Bubbles the task of looking after his weed plants. Easy, huh? Just give 'em some red, green, and blue. But which is which?
12	"Maybe My Cock Comes Out"	Mike Smith, JP Tremblay, Robb Wells	Mike Smith, JP Tremblay, Robb Wells	May 27, 2021
Ricky's having a bad morning. An unwelcome piss boner, no ice cream for breakfast... This jail fucking sucks!
13	"A Date With Class"	Mike Smith, JP Tremblay, Robb Wells	Mike Smith, JP Tremblay, Robb Wells	June 3, 2021
Forget chicken and banging, boys! Yolanda teaches the inmates how to behave on a romantic date. What could possibly go wrong?
14	"Is It Safe To Pull This Thing Out?"	Mike Smith, JP Tremblay, Robb Wells	Mike Smith, JP Tremblay, Robb Wells	June 10, 2021
Ricky has a new medical complaint - what the fuck is up with him this time? Bubbles rushes to the Sunnyvale Correctional Facility to investigate...
15	"I Don't Want No Trouble Trouble"	Mike Smith, JP Tremblay, Robb Wells	Mike Smith, JP Tremblay, Robb Wells	June 17, 2021
Fuck the Olympics, it's the annual Pop-O-Matic game tournament at the Sunnyvale Correctional Facility! Can Terry's lucky thumb win Julian some serious coin?

== Films ==
=== Trailer Park Boys (1999) ===
Title	Directed by	Written by	Produced by	Original theatrical release date	Original DVD release
Trailer Park Boys	Mike Clattenburg	Mike Clattenburg	Mike Clattenburg	July 15, 1999	TBA
Julian hires a film crew to document his life, after a psychic told him he would die in 5 days. He hires Ricky, who is currently engaged to Lucy, and lives in a house outside of the Trailer Park. This movie leads into the first episode of the TV show, with a clip being used in the latter.

=== The Movie (2006) ===
Title	Directed by	Written by	Produced by	Original theatrical release date	Original DVD release
Trailer Park Boys: The Movie	Mike Clattenburg	Mike Clattenburg & Robb Wells	Mike Clattenburg, Barrie Dunn, Michael Volpe & Ivan Reitman	October 6, 2006	February 20, 2007
Ricky, Julian and Bubbles come up with a scheme to steal large amounts of untraceable coins in a scheme they refer to as "The Big Dirty."

=== Countdown to Liquor Day (2009) ===
Title	Directed by	Written by	Produced by	Original theatrical release date	Original DVD release
Trailer Park Boys: Countdown to Liquor Day	Mike Clattenburg	Mike Clattenburg, Robb Wells, John Paul Tremblay, Mike Smith & Timm Hannebohm	Mike Clattenburg, Barrie Dunn & Michael Volpe	September 25, 2009	December 22, 2009
The boys return from jail to find the park has deteriorated, with a brand new park being created beside it. They attempt a series of get rich quick schemes and robberies, while a freshly drunk Lahey threatens to derail their plans.

=== Don't Legalize It (2014) ===
Title	Directed by	Written by	Produced by	Original theatrical release date	Original DVD release
Trailer Park Boys: Don't Legalize It	Mike Clattenburg	Mike Clattenburg & Mike O'Neill	Mike Clattenburg, Barrie Dunn & Michael Volpe	April 18, 2014	July 29, 2014
Recently out of jail and completely broke, Julian has a plan to get outrageously rich. However, he first has to deliver his product to Montreal where his rival Cyrus is waiting to close the deal. In the meantime, the government's plan to legalize cannabis threatens Ricky and his dope business, so he goes to Ottawa to take action against the impending bill. With Julian and Ricky on a road trip, Bubbles joins the pair with his own agenda – to go find the inheritance left for him by his long-lost parents. The trio runs into trouble when ex-park supervisor Jim Lahey and Randy go after the boys in hopes of making them rot in jail.

=== Trailer Park Boys Presents Standing on the Shoulders of Kitties: The Bubbles and the Shitrockers Story (2024) ===
Title	Directed by	Written by	Produced by	Original theatrical release date	Original DVD release
Trailer Park Boys Presents Standing on the Shoulders of Kitties: The Bubbles and the Shitrockers Story	Charlie Lightening	Mike Smith	Jamie Brown, Aaron Horton, Mike Smith, John Paul Tremblay, Lewin Webb, and Robb Wells	December 6, 2024	TBA
Bubbles' band "The Shitrockers" lands a European tour but gets kicked off, forcing them to busk. Randy is their roadie. Can Ricky and Julian save them from the streets of London?
