= Trailer Park Boys =

Canadian mockumentary television series

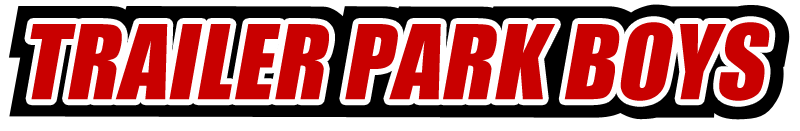
- Genre: Mockumentary; Sitcom; Black comedy; Crime comedy
- Created by: Mike Clattenburg
- Showrunners: Mike Clattenburg (season 1–7); Robb Wells (season 8–12); John Paul Tremblay (season 8–12); Mike Smith (season 8–12)
- Starring: John Paul Tremblay; Robb Wells; Mike Smith; John Dunsworth; Patrick Roach; Lucy DeCoutere; Sarah E. Dunsworth; Cory Bowles; Michael Jackson; Barrie Dunn; Jonathan Torrens; Jacob Rolfe; Shelley Thompson; Tyrone Parsons; Garry James; Sam Tarasco; Jeanna Harrison; George Green; Bernard Robichaud; Jim Swansburg; Richard Collins; Leigh MacInnis; Marguerite McNeil; Elliot Page (Note: Credited as Ellen Page; Page came out as transgender and changed his name in 2020.); Ardon Bess; Sandi Ross
- Voices of: Mike Smith
- Theme music composer: Blain Morris
- Composers: Blain Morris; Marc Mysterio
- Country of origin: Canada
- Original language: English
- No. of seasons: 12
- No. of episodes: 105 (+ 10 specials) (list of episodes)

Production
- Executive producers: Gary Howsam; Erica Benson; Norm Bolen; Rachel Fulford; Laura Michalchyshyn
- Producers: Mike Clattenburg; Barrie Dunn; Michael Volpe; Jonathan Walker; Mike Smith; John Paul Tremblay; Robb Wells
- Production locations: Dartmouth, Halifax, Nova Scotia, Canada
- Cinematography: Adamm Liley; David Albiston; Mike Clattenburg
- Editors: Jeremy Harty; Irving Thatcher; Sarah Byrne; Caley MacLennan; Mike Clattenburg
- Camera setup: Multiple-camera
- Running time: approx. 23 minutes (seasons 1–7); 23–32 minutes (seasons 8–12); 30–47 minutes (specials)
- Production companies: Trailer Park Productions (seasons 1–7); Topsail Entertainment (seasons 1–7); Showcase Television (seasons 1–7); Sunnyvale Productions (seasons 8–12); Swearnet Pictures (seasons 8–12); Rollercoaster Entertainment (season 13)

Original release
- Network: Showcase
- Release: April 22, 2001 – June 10, 2007
- Network: Netflix
- Release: September 5, 2014 – March 30, 2018

Trailer Park Boys is a Canadian mockumentary television sitcom, created by Mike Clattenburg, that began airing in 2001 as a continuation of his two short films, including 1995’s “The Cart Boy” and 1998’s “One Last Shot”. The show follows the misadventures of a group of trailer park residents, living in the fictional "Sunnyvale Trailer Park" in Dartmouth, Halifax, Nova Scotia. The series premiered on Showcase on April 22, 2001, and originally ran for seven seasons before concluding with a one-hour special on December 7, 2008. The series spawned four films: The Movie, released on October 6, 2006; Countdown to Liquor Day, released on September 25, 2009; Don't Legalize It, released on April 18, 2014; and Standing on the Shoulders of Kitties: The Bubbles and the Shitrockers Story was released in December 2024.

In 2013, Robb Wells, John Paul Tremblay, and Mike Smith, the actors who respectively portrayed Ricky, Julian, and Bubbles, purchased the rights to the show from the original producers and created their own internet streaming network, SwearNet. Starting in March 2014, SwearNet co-produced new episodes of the show with the American streaming service Netflix, and the eighth season premiered on September 5, 2014. Several specials and mini-series were made in the years that followed. An animated spinoff series premiered on March 31, 2019. In October 2019, filming began on a spinoff series, Trailer Park Boys: Jail, which premiered on SwearNet on January 1, 2021.

A ten episode Thirteenth season was announced for April 2026, but it has since been moved and no Release window has been announced.

== History ==
In 1998, director Mike Clattenburg wrote and directed One Last Shot, a short film shot in black-and-white. The film followed the exploits of two friends, Robb (Robb Wells) and Gary William or GW (John Paul Tremblay), although it is not based in the same setting as Trailer Park Boys. It was the first time Robb, John Paul and John Dunsworth worked together. In the 1999 feature film Trailer Park Boys, the character Julian states to the camera that he wanted his life to be documented after receiving a telephone psychic's prediction that he would die soon. He hoped that the film would deter others from the life of crime he had chosen.

The feature film was shown at the Atlantic Film Festival in 1999, and it caught the attention of producer Barrie Dunn, who saw the potential for a television series. Clattenburg and Dunn, along with Wells and Tremblay, worked on a proposal for a 13-episode season of the show and traveled to Toronto to pitch the show to The Comedy Network. After being turned down, they suddenly decided to pitch the show to Showcase before returning home to Nova Scotia. Tremblay recalled: "We showed Showcase the pilot and they really liked the characters and the mockumentary feel of it. It was very low budget. It was the right time, right place to pitch it." They found that the network was receptive. A former programmer at Showcase recalled: "It was original, bold, and outrageous. They were swearing, smoking and drinking. It felt new. Within a week we were talking about what a series would look like." The network sent them back with a commitment to a first season, with the provision that a second experienced producer (which ended up being Michael Volpe) be brought on board to assist the team. The first six 30-minute episodes were then written and filmed. Some modifications were made to the characters and storyline for the series, and more humor was added to the series in comparison to the film. The show debuted on Showcase on April 22, 2001, airing at 9:30pm. For season 2, the show began airing at 9:00pm.

The biggest change from film to series was the addition of Mike Smith's "Bubbles" character, who was originally developed for the earlier short film The Cart Boy, a film that Smith, Wells, Tremblay, and Clattenburg worked on together in 1995. Smith's character soon grew from a recurring character to one of the show's primary protagonists (although in the earlier film, "Bubbles" was the name of Smith's character's cat). Trailer Park Boys resided with Showcase for its first seven seasons. Beginning with the eighth season, the series was released through Netflix.

Early seasons were shot in various trailer parks in Nova Scotia, but the crew was not welcome to film again due to complaints from residents. These included Woodbine Home Park, an unnamed collection of trailers in central Dartmouth in Halifax next to the Tufts Cove Generating Station, Timberlea Mini Home Park and Greenridge Mobile Home Park. Seasons 5 to 7 were filmed at the former Cole Harbour Rehab Centre, which closed its doors in 2002, located near Bissett Lake in Cole Harbour. For this location, trailers were placed around an existing 2 floor building which also served as the set of the jail. When the series returned from hiatus beginning with Season 8, it was shot at Bible Hill Estates Trailer Park in Truro, Nova Scotia, with every subsequent episode being filmed at that location. After the 12th season, they ceased filming at the location and removed all sets and props from Bible Hill Estates, which still exists as an operating land lease community.

Ricky's car in the series, the "Shitmobile," was originally owned by Clattenburg. He donated it to the series because his wife no longer wanted to be forced to look at it sitting in the driveway.

Cory Bowles and Michael Jackson left the series because they felt they were underpaid. The show's initial run ended in 2007. Robb Wells recalled: "At a certain point it got too big. Too many people, too many crew. The shooting slowed way down. It was taking 4 days to shoot an episode versus 2.5. The old producers decided the show was basically done, and we sort of moved on. [...] Then the producers decided they wanted to do another movie. So we said, if we’re going to do a third movie, we want to do more than just that. We wanna do another season, maybe a fourth feature. Basically, we want to have the freedom to keep doing whatever we want." Wells, Smith and Tremblay would eventually purchase full rights to the series.

The series entered a production deal with Netflix in 2014. Mike Smith recalled: "Netflix was like, 'Send us the shit when you’re done,' and that’s what we did. You get a lot more done, you get it done quicker, and you get it done better because you get to have your vision true to what it was in the beginning." On September 1, 2014, Netflix announced that season 8 of Trailer Park Boys would be available on September 5. Season 9 of Trailer Park Boys was made available on March 27, 2015. On June 1, 2015, SwearNet officially announced that the production of Season 10 was underway. On March 28, 2016, Netflix released season 10 of the Trailer Park Boys. It consists of 10 episodes and includes appearances from several well-known stars such as Snoop Dogg, Jimmy Kimmel, Doug Benson and Tom Arnold. Two episodes were directed by Bobby Farrelly. On April 2, 2016, Lucy DeCoutere announced she was leaving the show. On April 20, 2016, Jonathan Torrens also announced he was leaving. On May 30, 2016, filming and production began for Season 11 of Trailer Park Boys. On July 5, 2016, filming for Season 11 was completed and editing began. On February 22, it was announced that Season 11 would air March 31, 2017. On March 31, 2017, Season 11 aired. On June 19, 2017, it was announced that filming of the twelfth season was officially underway. On October 16, 2017, John Dunsworth died at the age of 71, with Season 12 marking his final appearance on the show. Season 12, the final season produced as part of the Netflix deal was made available on March 30, 2018.

On March 31, 2019, Trailer Park Boys: The Animated Series premiered on Netflix. Smith later revealed in October that filming for another season titled Trailer Park Boys: Jail had begun. A second Christmas special, featuring never-before-seen footage of John Dunsworth prior to his death, premiered on Christmas Day, 2020. On January 1, 2021, Trailer Park Boys: Jail premiered on SwearNet.

In January 2025, Smith confirmed in character during a live stream on TikTok that Season 13 is confirmed, with filming slated to begin later in the year. On August 6, 2025, it was officially confirmed that the thirteenth season has finished filming and is scheduled for a release in April 2026 on the TPB+ streaming service. This release date will also coincide with the twenty-fifth anniversary of Trailer Park Boys.

In November 2025, Smith was charged by the Halifax Regional Police with sexual assault relating to an incident that allegedly occurred in December 2017. As a result, a statement was released on the official Trailer Park Boys Facebook page confirming that Smith has "stepped away from his role at Trailer Park Boys Incorporated" as a result of the controversy.

== Premise ==
=== Setting and characters ===
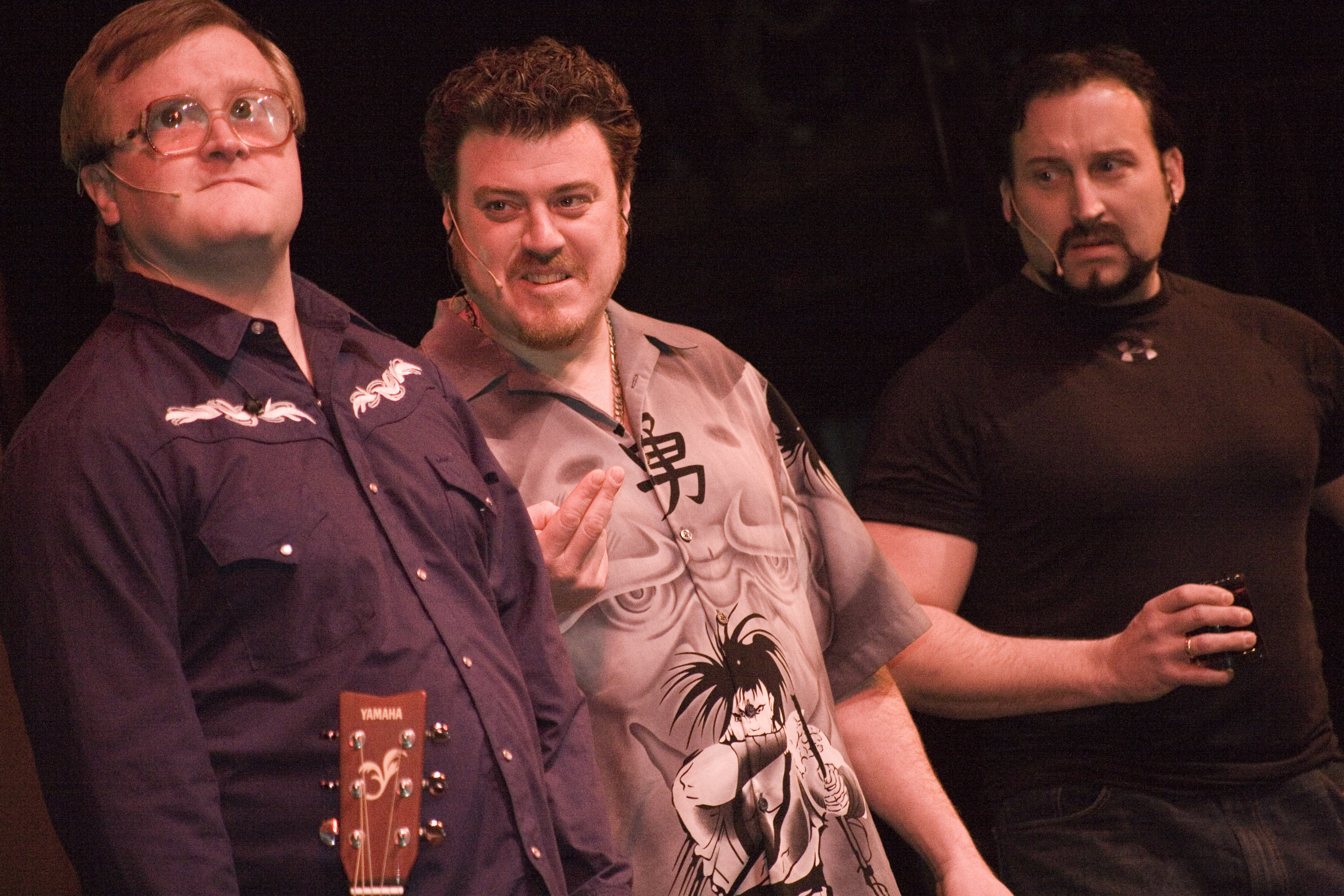
From left to right, Mike Smith as Bubbles, Robb Wells as Ricky LaFleur, John Paul Tremblay as Julian

Mike Smith, who portrayed Bubbles, said the series "was really like The Waltons, with guns and drugs and liquor."

The series follows Sunnyvale Trailer Park residents Ricky, Julian and Bubbles, whose attempts to make money frequently involve petty crime and schemes that end in failure. They repeatedly come into conflict with Sunnyvale's alcoholic trailer park supervisor, Jim Lahey, and his assistant Randy, who is later revealed to be Lahey's romantic partner.

Imprisonment and release form a recurring element of the series' narrative. In the original seasons, the characters' schemes frequently culminate in Ricky and Julian being sent to jail, with subsequent seasons beginning after their release and introducing new attempts to make money. Sutherland and Swan have described the series as addressing the cyclical relationship between poverty, crime and incarceration.

Each character has his or her own trademark mannerism or trait. Julian often takes a leadership role and devises schemes, all while holding a Cuba Libre on the rocks in his hand. Ricky believes himself to be dumb, and his speech is often laced with malapropisms that fans call "Rickyisms"; he lives in a dilapidated 1975 Chrysler New Yorker (nicknamed "the Shitmobile"), and grows cannabis. Bubbles wears spectacles that magnify his eyes to a hyperbolic extent, drives a go-kart, and lives in a shed with many cats; he is the least willing to face any repercussions for the trio's illegal activities. Alcoholic trailer park supervisor and disgraced ex-cop Jim Lahey usually attempts to derail the Boys' schemes, and nearly always shoehorns the word "shit" into his cautionary metaphors that fans call "Shitisms". Randy is Lahey's assistant and lover; he never wears a shirt unless he absolutely has to and is often taunted for his large gut and addiction to cheeseburgers.

An array of minor characters includes:

- Ricky's father Ray, who uses a wheelchair, is a former trucker and self-declared Calvinist who is secretly committing disability fraud, in addition to being an alcoholic and gambling addict. It was revealed in Season 11 that Ray was not Ricky’s biological father.
- Barbara is the trailer park owner and Lahey's ex-wife.
- Cory and Trevor are hapless best friends who assist and idolize Ricky and Julian, often unaware that they will serve as scapegoats when Ricky and Julian's plans inevitably go awry
- Jacob is a replacement for Trevor after Trevor disappears from Sunnyvale.
- Lucy is the mother of Ricky's daughter Trinity.
- Sarah, a friend, moved in with Lucy after Ricky's first imprisonment.
- J-Roc (real name Jamie) is a white aspiring rapper who is rarely seen without his friend, Tyrone, and antagonizes Randy whenever he appears.

== Format ==
The series is shot in a mockumentary style (including the use of long takes), featuring handheld camera work. Clattenburg stated that he was initially inspired by the filming techniques used on documentary series such as Cops, which Zanandi Botes of Cracked.com described as "focused on immersion and observation." Characters often speak directly to crew members, who occasionally become involved in the plot. In one episode, a crewman is shot; in another, one is tased by Jim Lahey. The show is loosely scripted, with much of the dialogue ad-libbed from basic plot points. These aspects are intended to evoke a sense of actualism war/realism, found footage, screenlife and very fast/shaky camera (Note: As known as Michael Bay, Roland Emmerich and Ekkehart Pollack). The trio have stated that many of the show's most popular moments were not in the script. To support the "lore" that the show is nonfiction and real viral cinematic, many of the actors (Note: Particularly Robb Wells, John Paul Tremblay, Mike Smith, John Dunsworth and Patrick Roach) often make public appearances in character. Mike Smith said: "Now, it turns into a bit of a circus. When we’re walking around the street, the guys who play Ricky and Julian look just like Ricky and Julian in real life, so they get spotted 100 yards away. I don’t really look like Bubbles, but if I’m with them, people put two and two together."

According to Tamara Jude of Screen Rant, the series' mockumentary format led some viewers to initially perceive it as some sort of "forced reality show" rather than a work of fiction, and also believed that the characters were real people.

The creators have stated that the series is largely episodic in structure for the benefit of accessibility.

The series incorporates character-driven humor.

== Opening sequence ==
The series' opening theme, “Breeze,” was composed by Blain Morris, who was attempting to emulate “I Left My Heart In San Francisco" by Tony Bennett. According to JD Roberson of Cracked.com, "The gentle song is the perfect juxtaposition to the chaos that will inevitably follow."

== Episodes ==
Season	Episodes	Originally released		
Season	Episodes	First released	Last released	Network
1	6	April 22, 2001	May 27, 2001	Showcase
2	7	June 23, 2002	August 4, 2002	Showcase
3	8	April 20, 2003	June 8, 2003	Showcase
4	8	April 11, 2004	May 30, 2004	Showcase
5	10	April 17, 2005	June 19, 2005	Showcase
6	6	April 16, 2006	May 21, 2006	Showcase
7	10	April 8, 2007	June 10, 2007	Showcase
8	10	September 5, 2014		Netflix
9	10	March 27, 2015		Netflix
10	10	March 25, 2016		Netflix
11	10	March 31, 2017		Netflix
12	10	March 30, 2018		Netflix

== Films and specials ==
=== Trailer Park Boys ===
The initial Trailer Park Boys movie was shown in 1999. It was directed, produced, and written by Mike Clattenburg. The film was shot in black-and-white, and it followed the criminal exploits of Robb Wells as Ricky LaFleur and John Paul Tremblay as Julian. The plot centered on Julian as he wished to document his life of crime after a psychic reading over the phone predicted his death. The movie was initially shown on the Showcase network prior to the TV show's airing. It featured various other cast members who would later appear in the TV series: Lucy DeCoutere as Ricky's fiancée Lucy, Jeanna Harrison-Steinhart as Ricky and Lucy's daughter Trinity, Sam Tarasco as Ricky and Julian's associate Sam, and Cory Bowles and Michael Jackson as two dim-witted friends Cory and Trevor respectively. A few other cast members who later appeared in the TV show also portrayed different characters in the film, such as Patrick Roach as the alcoholic dog owner Patrick (instead of the TV show's character Randy) and Mike Smith as the location sound recordist (instead of the TV show's character Bubbles). A short clip of the film's climax was shown during the pilot episode of season 1 which connected the film to the TV show.

=== Trailer Park Boys: The Movie ===
A movie based on the television series (and the second film in the franchise to be produced overall), titled Trailer Park Boys: The Movie (also known as The Big Dirty) was released on October 6, 2006, and distributed by Alliance Atlantis. Ivan Reitman produced the movie, Mike Clattenburg directed it, and Clattenburg and Robb Wells co-wrote it. It was nominated for a Genie Award for Best Motion Picture, but did not win.

=== Countdown to Liquor Day ===
The second film based on the series, Trailer Park Boys: Countdown to Liquor Day, was released in Canada on September 25, 2009. The movie serves as a continuation to the show's original seven season run.

=== Don't Legalize It ===
In May 2012, Mike Clattenburg announced on his Twitter page that a third film was in development. Principal photography was scheduled to begin in October 2012, but was pushed back to March 2013; filming began on March 17, 2013. On April 20, 2013, the production moved to Ottawa, Ontario, Canada, where filming took place at Parliament Hill during the 4/20 weekend. Entertainment One announced that the third and final film, Trailer Park Boys 3: Don't Legalize It, would be released in Canada on April 18, 2014.

The plot centers on Ricky's concerns that if the Canadian government legalized and controlled cannabis sale, it would put his grow-op out of business.

=== Standing on the Shoulders of Kitties: The Bubbles and the Shitrockers Story ===
It was announced on October 15, 2024 Via the shows official Instagram account that a fourth film with Mike Smith, Robb Wells, John Paul Tremblay, and Patrick Roach reprising their roles from the television show, as well as various actors new to the series, is coming out. Titled, Standing on the Shoulders of Kitties, the film was released to North American theatres on December 6, 2024.

=== Live in Fuckin' Dublin ===
A new 80-minute special titled Trailer Park Boys: Live In Fuckin' Dublin debuted on June 1, 2014, exclusively on Netflix. Footage from the trio's May 9, 2013, performance at the Olympia Theatre in Dublin, Ireland, the Ricky, Julian and Bubbles Community Service Variety Show, was collected for a concert film. The live show contains an introduction and epilogue shot in the format of a Trailer Park Boys episode, with the premise that the boys are arrested in Dublin and forced to serve community service by staging a puppet show discouraging drug and alcohol use. Some elements from the television series return in Live in Fuckin' Dublin, such as Alex Lifeson's (from the band Rush) feud with Ricky, Ricky's inadvertently gluing objects to his nose, and Conky's many resurrections. The film was released on June 1, 2014. The season 8 episode "Community Service and a Boner Made with Love" contains a similar premise.

=== Drunk, High & Unemployed Live from Austin Texas ===
A new live special titled Trailer Park Boys: Drunk, High & Unemployed Live from Austin, Texas debuted in 2016, exclusively on Netflix.

=== DVD releases ===
Entertainment One (formerly Alliance Home Entertainment) has released all twelve seasons of Trailer Park Boys on DVD in Region 1. The Say Goodnight to The Bad Guys special was also released on Blu-ray.

DVD name	Episodes	Release date
The Complete First and Second Seasons	13	May 27, 2003
The Complete Third Season	8	April 6, 2004
The Complete Fourth Season	8	April 12, 2005
Christmas Special	1	November 15, 2005
The Complete Fifth Season	10	May 9, 2006
The Complete Sixth Season	6	May 8, 2007
The Complete Seventh Season	10	May 6, 2008
Say Goodnight to the Bad Guys	1	December 7, 2010
The Complete Eighth Season	10	December 9, 2014
The Complete Ninth Season	10	June 2, 2015
The Complete Tenth Season	10	October 4, 2016
The Complete Eleventh Season	10	April 3, 2018
The Complete Twelfth Season	10	April 2, 2019
The Complete Series	55	June 16, 2009
The Complete Collection	55	October 11, 2011
Dressed All Over (The Complete Collection)	55 eps., 2 specials and 2 films	November 5, 2013

== Other media ==
=== Comics ===
On February 17, 2021, it was announced that the Trailer Park Boys Incorporated have collaborated with Devil's Due Publishing to make a comic book adaptation of the series which will only consist of one-shots and miniseries.

== Reception ==
The show became very successful in many countries. The show's lead trio formerly toured with Our Lady Peace, with whom Bubbles sings his trademark song "Liquor and Whores". On January 13, 2017, Trailer Park Boys and Bubbles finally released "Liquor & Whores" as an EDM track produced by Canadian Multi-Platinum producer, Marc Mysterio on Sony Music. The Trailer Park Boys have also appeared in music videos with Canadian rock band The Tragically Hip, and Bubbles has appeared with George Canyon and Snow, and they have been presenters at numerous award shows — always in character. Several famous artists appear on the show, such as Alex Lifeson from Rush in "Closer to the Heart," singer Rita MacNeil in the season four finale "Working Man," country singer-songwriter George Canyon in season seven's penultimate episode "Going Off the Rails On the Swayzie Train", Brian Vollmer from Helix, Sebastian Bach from Skid Row, the late singer-songwriter Denny Doherty of The Mamas and the Papas in the season seven finale "A Shitriver Runs Through It", and rapper Snoop Dogg, actor Tom Arnold, and comedian Doug Benson in several episodes in season ten starting with "Up In Smoke We Go". Canadian NHL superstar Nathan MacKinnon also appears in season eleven's episode "I Look Like A Fucking Dick!!".

The show was a success for the cable network Showcase, where it was the network's highest-rated Canadian original series. Internationally it aired in Australia on The Comedy Channel, the United Kingdom and Spain on Paramount Comedy, the Republic of Ireland on 3e, Iceland on SkjárEinn, New Zealand on TV 2, Israel on Xtra Hot, the Netherlands, Germany and Poland on respective local versions of Comedy Central for these three European countries, Denmark on DR2, Portugal on SIC Radical, Finland on Nelonen and Bulgaria on Nova Television. BBC America once aired a censored version of the series in the US. On February 5, 2009, satellite provider DirecTV began airing the series in the country on its channel The 101 Network uncensored at the rate of two episodes per week. DirecTV aired the entire seven-season run of Trailer Park Boys, plus both specials. All episodes aired on DirecTV are in 16:9 widescreen format (although not in High Definition resolution), as opposed to the standard definition 4:3 aspect DVD releases of the first five seasons. It is also available on Netflix. (Note: Depending on the country where the service is accessed.)
