= John Dunsworth =

Canadian actor and comedian (1946–2017)

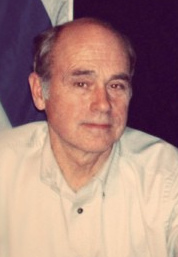
- Dunsworth in September 2011
- Born: April 12, 1946; Bridgewater, Nova Scotia, Canada
- Died: October 16, 2017 (aged 71); Halifax, Nova Scotia, Canada
- Occupations: Actor; filmmaker
- Years active: 1976–2017
- Spouse: Elizabeth Bates (m. 1974)
- Children: 4, including Sarah and Molly

John Francis Dunsworth (April 12, 1946 – October 16, 2017) was a Canadian actor and filmmaker. He was best known for playing trailer park supervisor Jim Lahey, the antagonist on the comedy series Trailer Park Boys (2001–2018). His other roles included the mysterious reporter Dave Teagues on the supernatural drama series Haven (2010–2015) and Officer McNabb in the CBC film Shattered City: The Halifax Explosion (2003). He also had extensive experience in regional theater.

== Early life ==
John Francis Dunsworth was born in Bridgewater, Nova Scotia, on April 12, 1946, the son of Frances and Frank Dunsworth. He had one older sibling and eight younger siblings. He studied theatre at the University of Guelph, but dropped out in his fourth year when the university forced him to take a philosophy course against his wishes. Returning to his hometown, he drove a taxi for three years and worked on the CNR trains from Halifax and Sydney.

== Career ==
Dunsworth began acting in numerous CBC radio dramas after dropping out of university, and had starring roles in many stage productions at the Neptune Theatre in Halifax. In 1970, he leased an abandoned building on Halifax's waterfront and converted it into a playhouse called the Pier One Theatre; it became the city's first and most successful alternative theater. In the late 1980s, Dalhousie University hired him to produce the university's welcome show for new students at the Rebecca Cohn Auditorium, in which he also occasionally had an unseen voice-over role. In 1987, he founded the casting agency Filmworks Casting and garnered a reputation as Halifax's most successful casting director. In 1988, he starred in the documentary John Dunsworth: The Candidate, which followed his journey as an underdog political candidate for the New Democratic Party in the Halifax Bedford Basin electoral ward during the 1988 Nova Scotia general election. He came third in the election, receiving 19.3% of the vote (2,746 votes).

Dunsworth met director Mike Clattenburg in the mid-1990s when he auditioned for a small role in Clattenburg's short film One Last Shot. His role gradually transformed into a leading part that earned him the award for Best Performance at the Atlantic Film Festival. From there, he further developed the character into what would eventually become the villainous trailer park supervisor Jim Lahey in Clattenburg's comedy series Trailer Park Boys (2001–2018). While filming a scene in a school during the production of the film Pit Pony (1997), in which he had a small role, Dunsworth is said to have discovered 10-year-old actor and future Trailer Park Boys cast member Elliot Page; he managed to get Page a large part in the film, which became Page's first screen credit. He appeared alongside fellow Trailer Park Boys co-stars John Paul Tremblay and Robb Wells in the film Virginia's Run (2002). He also starred in Haven (2010–2015), the television adaptation of the Stephen King novel The Colorado Kid. He reunited with many of his Trailer Park Boys castmates in the new series The Drunk and On Drugs Happy Fun Time Hour (2010).

== Personal life ==
Dunsworth lived in his native Nova Scotia with his wife, Elizabeth Bates, whom he married in 1974. They had a son named Geoff and three daughters named Zoë, Sarah, and Molly, the latter two of whom became actresses.

In contrast to his Trailer Park Boys character, Dunsworth rarely drank alcohol and usually used iced tea as a stand-in for alcohol on the show. He admitted to suffering from a gambling problem in his early years. As a result of his recovery, he had been active in trying to remove video lottery terminals from bars in Nova Scotia. He was a boating enthusiast who frequently spent time on his yacht, Emerald Princess, and enjoyed building granite sculptures and structures with stone and concrete; he documented the latter on his YouTube channel. He was an avid bridge player and was regarded as a master of the game. He once appeared on stage with Guns N' Roses, with frontman Axl Rose describing himself as a fan of Trailer Park Boys and Dunsworth's character in particular.

== Death ==
On October 16, 2017, at the age of 71, Dunsworth died of an initially undisclosed illness in Halifax, Nova Scotia. In a statement, his daughter Sarah described the illness as "short and unexpected" and stated that Dunsworth was an "amazing husband, father, and grandfather". On May 26, 2021, a Facebook post by a fan page under the control of Dunsworth's surviving family and friends revealed complications from thrombotic thrombocytopenic purpura as his cause of death. He is buried at St. Anthony's & St. Augustine's Catholic Cemetery in Simms Settlement, Nova Scotia.

== Filmography ==
Dunsworth had 70 credits to his name, some of which are listed below.

=== Film ===
Year	Title	Role	Notes
1978	So Long to Run		
1992	Buried on Sunday		
1998	One Last Shot	Mr. Lahey	
2001	The Shipping News	Guy Quoyle	
2001	A Glimpse Of Hell		
2002	The Christmas Shoes		
2006	A Bug and a Bag of Weed		
2006	Trailer Park Boys: The Movie	Jim Lahey	
2007	Stuck		
2008	Say Goodnight to the Bad Guys	Jim Lahey	
2009	Trailer Park Boys: Countdown to Liquor Day	Jim Lahey	
2011	Cloudburst		
2011	Take This Waltz		
2014	Trailer Park Boys 3: Don't Legalize It	Jim Lahey	
2014	Swearnet: The Movie		
2014	Santa Quest		
2014	Lizzie Borden Took An Ax		

=== Television ===
Year	Title	Role	Notes
1997	Pit Pony		Television film
1997	Lexx: The Dark Zone		Mini-series
1999–2002	Lexx	Lett	s2 e18 'Brigadoom'
2001–2008 2014–2018	Trailer Park Boys	Jim Lahey	Season 12 was released posthumously
2001	Three Days		Television film
2002	Trudeau	Delegate	Mini-series
2002	The Christmas Shoes		Television film
2003	Shattered City: The Halifax Explosion		Television film
2004	Reversible Errors		Television film
2004	The Trailer Park Boys Christmas Special	Jim Lahey	Television special
2005	Jesse Stone: Stone Cold		Television film
2005	Trudeau II: Maverick in the Making	Emery Beaulieu	Mini-series
2005	Ambulance Girl		Television film
2005	The Hunt for the BTK Killer		Television film
2010–2015	Haven	Dave Teagues	
2010	The Gospel According to the Blues		
2011	The Drunk and On Drugs Happy Fun Time Hour		
2012	Titanic: The Aftermath		
2013	Forgive Me	The Prelate	
2019–2020	Trailer Park Boys: The Animated Series	Jim Lahey	Voice role Archive recordings Posthumous release
2020	Live at Red Rocks	Jim Lahey	Posthumous release Final appearance in Trailer Park Boys media

=== Notes ===
- Dunsworth is credited in Dolores Claiborne as a part of the crew but did not appear in the film.
