= List of Trailer Park Boys characters =

The following characters are featured in the Canadian television series Trailer Park Boys.

== Main characters ==
Character	Actor	Seasons											
Character	Actor	1	2	3	4	5	6	7	8	9	10	11	12
Julian	John Paul Tremblay	Main	Main	Main	Main	Main	Main	Main	Main	Main	Main	Main	Main
Ricky	Robb Wells	Main	Main	Main	Main	Main	Main	Main	Main	Main	Main	Main	Main
Bubbles	Mike Smith	Main	Main	Main	Main	Main	Main	Main	Main	Main	Main	Main	Main
Jim Lahey	John Dunsworth	Main	Main	Main	Main	Main	Main	Main	Main	Main	Main	Main	Main
Randy	Patrick Roach	Main	Main	Main	Main	Main	Main	Main	Main	Main	Main	Main	Main
Lucy	Lucy DeCoutere	Main	Main	Main	Main	Main	Main	Main	Main	Main	Main		
Sarah	Sarah E. Dunsworth	Main	Main	Main	Main	Main	Main	Main	Main	Main	Main	Main	Main
J-Roc	Jonathan Torrens	Main	Main	Main	Main	Main	Main	Main	Main	Main	Main		
Cory	Cory Bowles	Main	Main	Main	Main	Main	Main		Main	Main	Main	Main	Main
Trevor	Michael Jackson	Main	Main	Main	Main	Main	Main						
Ray	Barrie Dunn	Main	Main	Main	Main	Main	Main	Main					
Trinity	Jeanna Harrison	Main		Main	Main	Main	Main	Main	Main	Main	Main	Main	Main
Levi	Ardon Bess	Main											
Desiree	Sandi Ross	Main											
Treena Lahey	Elliot Page	(Note: Deleted scenes only.)	Main										
Barbara Lahey	Shelley Thompson	Guest (Note: Uncredited appearance as a wedding minister who isn't explicitly identified as Barbara Lahey.)	Main	Main	Main	Main	Main	Main	Main	Main	Main	Main	Main
Sam Losco	Sam Tarasco	Recurring	Main		Guest		Recurring	Recurring	Main	Recurring	Recurring	Recurring	
Tyrone	Tyrone Parsons	Recurring	Recurring	Main	Main	Main	Main	Main	Main	Main	Main	Main	Main
Detroit Velvet Smooth	Garry James			Recurring	Main	Main							
Cyrus	Bernard Robichaud	Recurring	Recurring		Recurring	Main			Main	Recurring			
Philadelphia "Phil" Collins	Richard Collins	Guest (Note: Uncredited appearance as bystander in the confrontation between Julian and Cyrus.)			Guest	Recurring	Guest	Main					
Jacob Collins	Jacob Rolfe	Guest	Recurring	Guest	Recurring	Recurring		Main	Main	Main	Main	Main	Main
George Green	George Green	Guest	Recurring	Recurring	Recurring	Recurring	Recurring	Recurring	Main	Main	Guest	Main	Main
Don/Donna	Leigh MacInnis								Main	Main	Main		
Leslie Dancer	Daniel Lillford									Main	Recurring		
Detective Ted Johnston	Jim Swansburg	Guest				Recurring	Recurring	Recurring			Recurring	Main	Recurring
Marguerite Murphy	Marguerite McNeil								Guest	Recurring	Recurring	Main	Main

=== Ricky ===
Richard "Ricky" LaFleur (played by Robb Wells), is one of the three primary characters in the series. Ricky is described as a fun-loving, dim-witted slacker who enjoys marijuana, Jalapeño Potato Chips, pepperoni, chicken chips, licorice, cigarettes, ravioli, chicken fingers, fish sticks, and alcoholic beverages. One of his biggest weaknesses is education as he only made it as far as Grade 10, not completely finished with High School. His career in crime stimulated from his childhood, involving his father. He is known to lack patience and tends to react violently.

=== Julian ===
Julian "Jules" (played by John Paul Tremblay) is the eldest primary character in the series. He is responsible for hiring the camera crew that follows the characters around, originally meant to document his life. Like Ricky, Julian enjoys marijuana and alcoholic beverages, and he used to smoke cigarettes. In the original 1999 black-and-white movie Trailer Park Boys, Julian sold and used cocaine, and Ricky also indulged. Despite being a career criminal, Julian follows a clearly defined set of morals and often displays a level of honour and selflessness well beyond that of a normal criminal, which makes him the de facto leader of the trio

=== Bubbles ===
Bubbles (played by Mike Smith) is the youngest primary character, Julian and Ricky's closest friend, and the series' breakout character. In the first season, like most of the characters in the show, Bubbles maintains a somewhat-reserved demeanour to look good on camera. Early on, he reveals that he was abandoned by his parents, retaining only a bubble-making machine as keepsake from his childhood. As the series progresses, he reveals many sides to his personality.

Bubbles's full name is not revealed until a later TPB film, Trailer Park Boys: Don't Legalize It. In a scene, his parents' mailbox reveals his last name to be Harnis, a play on the name for a business, Harness Work. Throughout the Trailer Park Boys series, he is simply referred to as 'Bubbles' by other characters, friends, hospitals, courts, and other officials and entities. He is known for his hoarse Maritimer English, sensitive nature, pearl snap shirts, and thick glasses that magnify his eyes to a considerable degree. Bubbles has never been seen without his glasses, even in photographs of him as a child. His home is a shed on the trailer park and he is socially inept.

==== Conky ====
Conky is a ventriloquist puppet that Bubbles received from a family member who used him in vaudeville times. Bubbles treats Conky as a trusted friend, but bestows him with a caustic, annoying, and domineering personality. Conky tends to insult people, especially Ricky; his utterances even shock Bubbles himself.

=== Jim Lahey ===
James "Jim" Lahey (played by John Dunsworth) is the supervisor of Sunnyvale Trailer Park. In his youth, Lahey was an idealistic police officer, but since his wrongful dismissal as a result of a prank by Julian, Ricky, and Bubbles on Halloween 1977, he degenerated into a bitter alcoholic. Still, he has devoted himself to making Sunnyvale a better place to live, accompanied by his devoted assistant Randy. Even in his most incoherent moments, Lahey maintains an extreme affinity for the trailer park and all of its residents except Ricky. In spite of all that, he remains devoted to liquor as he tells everyone to "Trust the Liquor" while making claims about the existence of "Shit-Hawks" present.

=== Randy ===
Randy
- Trailer Park Boys character
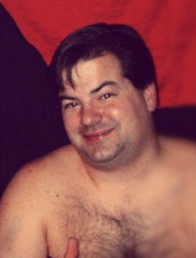
- First appearance: "Take Your Little Gun and Get Out of My Trailer Park" (2001)
- Created by: Mike Clattenburg; John Paul Tremblay; Robb Wells; Barrie Dunn
- Portrayed by: Patrick Roach

In-universe information
- Aliases: Smokey; Randall; Christian Tootle
- Nicknames: Bobandy; Cheeseburger Walrus; Lord of the Onion Rings
- Occupation: Male prostitute Assistant trailer park supervisor
- Significant others: Jim Lahey; Lucy LaFleure
- Home: Sunnyvale Trailer Park, Dartmouth, Nova Scotia, Canada
- Nationality: Canadian

Randall, commonly referred to as Randy and Bobandy (pronounced: BOW-bandy) (played by Patrick Roach), is Jim Lahey's devoted assistant trailer park supervisor. Their relationship began in 1997 when Lahey's then-wife Barbara found Randy turning tricks for cheeseburgers while calling himself "Smokey" and wearing a cowboy hat. Out of her Christian charity, she invited him to stay with them for a time.

It is revealed in the sixth season that Randy is bisexual; he had been maintaining a sexual relationship with Lahey, but also becomes sexually attracted to Sarah and Lucy, the latter apparently being pregnant by him. Randy and the boys were schoolyard chums and, though he usually sides with Lahey against them, he also demonstrates some lingering thread of friendship toward them. Randy will sometimes seek the Boys' assistance whenever Lahey goes overboard with his antics. He almost never wears a shirt, citing that he is allergic to fabric and will get rashes. However, Randy will wear a shirt under very rare circumstances, and only when he has no choice but to wear one. One example includes the second-season episode "Never Trust a Man with No Shirt On," when Randy wears a shirt to conceal his radio while eavesdropping on the Boys to gather information on their grow-op. He also wears very tight white pants, which he removes when preparing to engage in a physical fight.

He is addicted to cheeseburgers and onion rings (thus being called "Lord of the Onion Rings") and his resulting pronounced belly is his major target for ridicule, especially from J-Roc, who will often crouch down and speak directly to Randy's belly (or "cheeseburger locker", as J-Roc puts it). In the seventh season, Randy becomes a frequent user of marijuana and goes into business with Phil Collins, operating an RV/food truck producing hamburgers, which are called "Dirty Burger"(s). In the episode "Jump The Cheeseburger", he attempts to jump an inflatable cheeseburger on his bicycle while wrapped in cardboard for protection. The jump is a failure, and Phil eventually fires Randy due to his marijuana addiction.

Randy's relationship with Lahey mirrors their work hierarchy, with Lahey calling the shots, speaking in a commanding voice, and doing what he wants, while Randy obediently conforms, following orders with a warm "Yes, Mr. Lahey". At the same time, Lahey holds deep affection for Randy, and is usually seen as sad whenever Randy breaks up with him. Similarly, Randy holds deep concern for Lahey's well-being, specifically his severe alcoholism. Randy patiently tries to bring out the best in Lahey by subtle means.

For example, with Lahey's drunk antics going out of control, Randy videotapes them with the hope of showing them to him later. Randy calls Lahey "Mr. Lahey", except on very rare occasions when he is angry with him and (rather contemptuously) calls him "James". Lahey affectionately calls him "Bo-Bandy" occasionally when he is drunk. Like Lahey, Randy drinks heavily, but he is sober more often than Lahey and acts as the voice of reason during Lahey's occasional lapses of sanity. Although he starts smoking marijuana in Season 7, Randy no longer smokes after that season.

=== Lucy ===
Lucy
- Trailer Park Boys character
- First appearance: Trailer Park Boys (1999)
- Last appearance: "Looks Like The Liquor Wins" (2016)
- Created by: Mike Clattenburg
- Portrayed by: Lucy DeCoutere

In-universe information
- Occupation: Stripper; Nanny for Tom Arnold
- Family: Mo (grandson); Jacob Collins (son-in-law); Trinity (daughter)
- Spouse: Ricky
- Significant others: Julian; Randy; Sonny; Cyrus; George Green
- Children: Trinity (daughter); Randy Jr. (son)
- Home: Sunnyvale Trailer Park, Dartmouth, Nova Scotia, Canada
- Nationality: Canadian

Lucy (played by Lucy DeCoutere) is Ricky's on-and-off again girlfriend from the first season to the tenth season. Ricky is extremely loyal to Lucy, but Lucy is promiscuous, especially when intoxicated and stoned on marijuana, but Lucy expressed a genuine desire to be a responsible parent and will go to great lengths to ensure that Trinity does not end up like her father.

Lucy and Julian had a brief relationship after high school, which Julian would rather forget (it is occasionally implied throughout the series that Julian, not Ricky, is Trinity's biological father, though this is never confirmed). Her relationship with Ricky has taken many turns throughout the series; at the end of the first season, she agrees to marry Ricky though she never seemed interested in doing so, but she breaks up with him after he's arrested during the wedding. In Season 2, Lucy starts going out with Ricky's nemesis Cyrus, but the relationship falls apart after Cyrus' meltdown from failing Grade 10. Ricky is finally able to rekindle their relationship during the fifth season.

She also tends to gravitate toward men who can do something for her, or demonstrate the ability to elevate her to a status level better than the one she has. This is why she rejects Ricky when he is down and out, but takes him back when he starts to grow dope or has any moderate amount of money.

Lucy has a boob job in the fifth season, a fact that Ricky didn't seem to notice, other than it seemed he was more than usually turned on by her and couldn't figure out why. In the later movies she began working at the local strip club, or as it is called, the "gentleman's club" where she has a fling with her boss, Sonny.

At the end of the seventh season, she gives birth to Randy's son, who was conceived during a weekend Ricky spent in jail. Although Ricky has difficulty accepting that the baby is not his, he's happy he doesn't have to pay child support, but still treats the baby as his own. In the tenth season, Randy eventually reveals that Baby Randy was put up for adoption in order to keep the baby away from the negative influences of the trailer park.

In the first episode of the eleventh season, it is revealed that Lucy has left Canada (presumably for the United States) and is working as a nanny for Tom Arnold. Ricky explains (to the camera) that, after he was almost killed near the end of the tenth season, Lucy gave him an ultimatum: stop partying completely, or she would leave. Needless to say, Ricky didn't manage to comply.

=== Sarah ===
Sarah
- Trailer Park Boys character
- First appearance: Trailer Park Boys (1999)
- Created by: Mike Clattenburg
- Portrayed by: Sarah E. Dunsworth
- Voiced by: Sarah E. Dunsworth (The Animated Series)

In-universe information
- Alias: Sara
- Significant others: Ricky LaFleur; Cory and Trevor; Jacob Collins
- Home: Sunnyvale Trailer Park, Dartmouth, Nova Scotia, Canada
- Nationality: Canadian

Sarah (played by Sarah E. Dunsworth) is Lucy's best friend and roommate. She moved in with Lucy and Trinity while Ricky was in prison at the beginning of the first season. Both the actress and her character were credited as Sara during the first season.

Sarah is much more insightful and level-headed than Lucy. She and Lucy make their living running a beauty salon out of their trailer. Although she prefers to distance herself from the Boys' antics, she will often lend her assistance if she stands to gain from it.

Her relationship with Ricky is a key aspect of her character; she dates Ricky in the second season after Lucy breaks up with him. But after Ricky is arrested again, she breaks up with him and becomes increasingly disrespectful and hostile towards him.

In the fourth season, she begins dating Cory and Trevor, becoming very protective of them and trying to discourage them from working with Ricky. Near the end of the season, she announced plans to marry Cory and Trevor. However, during the fifth season, she denied being their girlfriend or lover.

She often mocks Ricky's intelligence (or lack thereof) and chastises him for mistreating Cory and Trevor.

In real life, Sarah is the daughter of John Dunsworth (a long-time series regular who played Jim Lahey).

=== Cory and Trevor ===
Cory
- Trailer Park Boys character
- First appearance: Trailer Park Boys (1999)
- Created by: Mike Clattenburg
- Portrayed by: Cory Bowles
- Voiced by: Corey Bowles (The Animated Series)

In-universe information
- Occupation: Criminal; Amateur porn star Rapper
- Home: Sunnyvale Trailer Park, Dartmouth, Nova Scotia, Canada
- Nationality: Canadian

Trevor
- Trailer Park Boys character
- First appearance: Trailer Park Boys (1999)
- Last appearance: Trailer Park Boys: The Movie (2006)
- Created by: Mike Clattenburg
- Portrayed by: Michael Jackson

In-universe information
- Nickname: Trevster
- Occupation: Criminal; Amateur porn star
- Home: Sunnyvale Trailer Park, Dartmouth, Nova Scotia, Canada
- Nationality: Canadian

Cory (played by Cory Bowles) and Trevor (played by Michael Jackson) are a pair of hapless, misguided, and codependent young men whom Ricky and Julian often use as jail cover and as scapegoats for whenever their plans go awry; the younger boys are sometimes responsible for these dilemmas, due either to their own incompetence or unfortunate circumstances.

Roommates and best friends, Cory and Trevor are rarely seen apart. They have been helping the Boys since they were six years old and admire them to the point of hero-worship. Although Julian genuinely cares about their well-being and seems to be more patient with them, Ricky is the total opposite and is abusive towards them and treats them shabbily, frequently blaming them for what goes wrong - no matter who or what is actually at fault - while demanding cigarettes.

Cory is generally more socially adept and the more aggressive of the duo. He has braided hair and regularly wears a hat and a tank top, and also often has a toothpick in his mouth. By comparison, Trevor is often seen as the less intelligent person of the pair, and is frequently ridiculed for his slender appearance, particularly by Bubbles who at one point compared him to an alien. He bears the brunt of the abuse from the Boys as well. Trevor has long hair, but in Seasons 2, 3 and 6, he sports a mullet.

In Season 4, Sarah "adopts" the pair and acts as a maternal figure for the two to discourage them from hanging out with Ricky and Julian. However, Cory and Trevor continue to work for them over Sarah's objections. After spending all the money the Boys earned on a lucrative drug deal at the end of Season 4, Cory and Trevor, fearing for their safety, get a restraining order against Ricky. As punishment, they start working almost solely for Julian, who "trains" them as one would train a dog: whistling for them to come, issuing simple commands, and rewarding good "performance" with treats. Cory and Trevor help the Boys fend off an attack by Cyrus and his partners at the end of Season 5, but suffer gunshot wounds and get sent to jail along with Ricky and Julian.

When they are not helping the Boys, Cory and Trevor will either be spending time playing video games, working for J-Roc, looting vehicles, or running the local trailer-park shop with Sarah. Cory is also known to venture into rapping, but his talents are derided by the trailer park residents as inferior compared to J-Roc. A running joke for Cory and Trevor is their tendency to raise their hands hoping for a high five from the boys, who usually leave them hanging.

Bowles and Jackson left the show after the sixth season, due to their discontent about the direction of the show; their departure was explained by the announcement in Season 7 that Cory and Trevor had been committed to a mental institution and were advised to never return to Sunnyvale. Cory returns alone in the eighth season, after Trevor went missing while they were in New York City. He resumes his role as a lackey to Ricky and Julian, with trailer park resident Jacob taking Trevor's role.

=== Ray LaFleur ===
Ray LaFleur
- Trailer Park Boys character
- First appearance: "Take Your Little Gun and Get Out of My Trailer Park" (2001)
- Last appearance: Don't Legalize It (2014)
- Created by: Mike Clattenburg; John Paul Tremblay; Robb Wells
- Portrayed by: Barrie Dunn

In-universe information
- Full name: Ray Flower (previously Ray LaFleur)
- Nicknames: Ray, The guy in the chair
- Occupation: Retired truck driver Amateur porn star Trailer park supervisor Bootlegger
- Children: Ricky LaFleur (son*)
- Nationality: Canadian
- Residence: An undisclosed dump located in Florida, USA

Ray LaFleur (played by Barrie Dunn) is a career truck driver and irresponsible father figure to Ricky. Although he is not Ricky's biological father, he still cared for Ricky for the majority of his life. His wife Tammy left him after Ricky was born.

At first this was explained by Lahey, claiming it was due to him fathering Ricky and having an affair with Tammy. However, after it was revealed Lahey was not in fact Ricky's father, Tammy's departure was never clarified. Regardless, this has led to a deep-seated rivalry with Lahey, and the duo will frequently go out of their way to humiliate one another.

His parental involvement with his son was lax, but their relationship is strong. Like Ricky, Ray never finished school and, as a result, is widely regarded as stupid amongst the trailer park residents; Ricky's own problems can be in part attributed to Ray. Unlike Ricky, Ray has a calm demeanor and rarely yells at other people, even when agitated. He often calls people "bud" or "buddy", even if it is someone he dislikes. He usually brushes off bad situations with phrases like "the way she goes" and "it's the way of the road".

Ray was a truck driver prior to the start of the series, but he lost his license after he crashed his truck into a post office while drunk. Since then, Ray has been on disability fraud living off workers' compensation, claiming that he suffered a crippling muscle spasm that renders him unable to walk. He spends most of the series in a wheelchair, although he often gets out of it and walks around when he is in his trailer or in the company of people he can trust. However, in Season 2 he uses a cane to walk around without arousing suspicion. Ray is eventually exposed and imprisoned in Season 5 after Lahey finds a video of him getting out of his wheelchair.

While in a wheelchair he constantly refers to himself as "the guy in the chair". From his truck-driving years he has acquired the habit of urinating in jugs, which he leaves around the trailer park. Like Lahey, Ray is an alcoholic, but is willing to go greater depths to obtain alcohol. For example, in one instance he agreed to be beaten up in exchange for liquor. At one point, Ray ripped the plumbing out of his own trailer to sell as scrap in order to get money for more alcohol.

Ray claims to be a Calvinist, although his understanding of Calvinism (and of Christianity in general) is quite limited; the main appeal of Calvinism is the concept of predestination, which he misinterprets to mean that he need not account for his irresponsible actions. Ray also often refers to the Bible in an attempt to guilt others into helping him. He is addicted to gambling, and often loses his money playing video lottery terminals.

Up until Season 5, Ray had his own trailer on a 35-year mortgage that he had finally paid off. However, it burned down after Ricky left the stove on. Ray lives in his old sleeper cabin until his eviction from Sunnyvale in Season 6, at which point he relocates with the sleeper cabin to a local dump yard. After Lahey was reinstated as a police officer at the end of Season 6, Ray was allowed to return to Sunnyvale and was given Lahey's former position of trailer park supervisor, although he was negligent of his duties. In season 7, in exchange for helping Lahey frame officers Green and Johnson for police brutality as revenge for trying to kill him, Ray has his DUI records erased and is able to resume his old job as a truck driver. However, this is short lived as Ray is arrested in Maine after trying to solicit an undercover cop while running scrap metal with Bubbles.

In Trailer Park Boys: Don't Legalize It Ray seemingly died as the result of an explosion in the Zellers parking lot where he lived and sold hotdogs after he was kicked out of the dump, but it was later revealed that he performed a life-insurance fraud scam and is actually alive and living in a Florida dump.

Julian and Bubbles’ surnames were never spoken on-screen. Ricky's is (LaFleur), and it is revealed by Julian and Bubbles that Ray changed his last name to flower from LaFleur because he was getting grief from other truckers. This is revealed when Julian and Bubbles are looking for evidence in the hospital's records that Lahey is not Ricky's biological father (blood type). While it has not yet been confirmed at what point in his life he made this change, we can assume that it was made after Ricky was born, due to an argument in the twelfth season between Ricky and his girlfriend, Susan, where she calls him "Ricky LaFleur."

=== Jacob Collins ===
Jacob Collins
- Trailer Park Boys character
- First appearance: "Take Your Little Gun and Get Out of My Trailer Park" (2001)
- Created by: Mike Clattenburg; John Paul Tremblay; Robb Wells
- Portrayed by: Jacob Rolfe
- Voiced by: Jacob Rolfe (The Animated Series)

In-universe information
- Full name: Jacob Collins
- Nickname: Jacob
- Occupation: Convenience store cashier, hardware store cashier, soldier, pizzeria employee, and various other occupations.
- Family: Philadelphia Collins (father); Thomas Collins (brother)
- Spouse: Trinity Collins (wife)
- Children: Mo (son)
- Nationality: Canadian
- Residence: Sunnyvale Trailer Park, Dartmouth, Nova Scotia, Canada

Jacob Collins (played by Jacob Rolfe) is a young man who often works at a convenience store, a hardware store, and other minimum wage jobs to make even.

For most of the early seasons, Jacob's appearances revolve around being robbed by Cory and Trevor, or Ricky, and being fired as a result. In the seventh season, Jacob is revealed to be the son of Philadelphia Collins, and takes a more active role in the show, and eventually acts as a replacement for Trevor while working with Cory.

Jacob idolizes Julian, going so far as to mimic his appearance and mannerisms throughout Season 7. During this time, after Cory and Trevor were committed to a mental hospital, the Boys recruit Jacob and a couple of his classmates to help them on a marijuana smuggling scheme in league with Sebastian Bach. In a manner similar to Julian, Jacob takes a leadership role within his own posse.

In the eighth season, Jacob takes the place of Trevor since Cory's arrival back at Sunnyvale. Jacob works for Julian while Cory works for Ricky, but they both work together on the same projects despite working for two different people.

Jacob is the father of Trinity's son; Mo, whom she wanted to name Ray but Jacob messed up the birth certificate so that the name is listed as "The Motel". At the end of the tenth season, he marries Trinity in a hospital. In the eleventh season, he gets an allergic reaction to Ricky's dog which causes him to lose his hair for a short period of time.

=== Barb Lahey ===
Barb Lahey
- Trailer Park Boys character
- First appearance: "What in the Fuck Happened to Our Trailer Park"; Trailer Park Boys; June 23, 2002
- Last appearance: "Trailerstock"; The Animated Series; March 31, 2019
- Created by: Mike Clattenburg; John Paul Tremblay; Robb Wells; Barrie Dunn
- Portrayed by: Shelley Thompson
- Voiced by: Shelley Thompson (The Animated Series)

In-universe information
- Full name: Barbara Lahey
- Nickname: Barb
- Occupation: Trailer park owner
- Spouse: James "Jim" Lahey (husband)
- Children: Treena Lahey (daughter)
- Home: Sunnyvale Trailer Park, Dartmouth, Nova Scotia, Canada
- Nationality: Canadian

Barbara "Barb" Lahey (played by Shelley Thompson) is the owner of Sunnyvale Trailer Park. She was married to the park's supervisor Jim Lahey until she divorced him after being embarrassed at his alcohol addiction.

Initially, Barb lived outside of the park in a proper home. But due to financial hardships, her home was foreclosed on and she had to move into the park supervisor's trailer just after Ricky lost the job to Jim in a wrestling match. Despite being divorced throughout the series, Barb and Jim are still on fairly good terms throughout the series, and still harbor feelings for each other. She is also on good terms with the Boys, and usually tolerates their activities within the park, provided they pay their lot fees. Barb dates Sam Losco in the second season, but breaks up with him after discovering his involvement in one of J-Roc's porn films.

Barb becomes a full-time resident of Sunnyvale in the fourth season, after financial troubles force her to sell her house. She and Jim have a daughter named Treena. Barb is considered to be rather promiscuous and had once proposed marriage to Ricky, prior to the latter being sent to jail at the end of the fourth season. Barb had gotten back with Jim in the seventh season, but later ran off with Sam Losco towards the end of the season.

Shelley Thompson first appeared as the officiant of Ricky and Lucy's disrupted wedding at the end of the first season, though she was not identified as Barbara Lahey.

=== T (Tyrone) ===
Tyrone (T)
- Trailer Park Boys character
- First appearance: "Take Your Little Gun and Get Out of My Trailer Park" (2001)
- Created by: Mike Clattenburg; John Paul Tremblay; Robb Wells
- Portrayed by: Tyrone Parsons (T aka Tyrone)
- Voiced by: Tyrone Parsons (The Animated Series)

In-universe information
- Occupation: Rapper; Criminal; Thief; Amateur porn director Manager of a cell phone business
- Home: Sunnyvale Trailer Park, Dartmouth, Nova Scotia, Canada
- Nationality: Canadian

Tyrone (played by Tyrone Parsons) or "T", as he prefers to be called, born Tyler, leads a gang called the "Roc-Pile", which is responsible for some of the criminal activity in the park.

J-Roc and the Roc-Pile often help Ricky and Julian with their money-making schemes, usually by acting as their fence or providing them with extra manpower unless it involves gunfights, at which point they refuse to partake. T often tags along with J-Roc in whatever scheme he is involved in, but will frequently berate him for his antics.

During the sixth and seventh season, J-Roc and T father children with two different women and, unable to tell whose child is whose, they agree to raise them together as "co-daddies".

After the series was relaunched on Netflix with the eighth season, J-Roc's and T's children were not seen again, and their current whereabouts remained unknown. In Season 9, Tyrone is working as a massage therapist at Mystic Fingers Day Spa and his home taxi driving business "T's-axi". In the first episode of the eleventh season (around 14 minutes into the episode), it is revealed that T is seen managing a cell phone business and is now successful.

=== Detroit Velvet Smooth ===
Detroit Velvet Smooth
- Trailer Park Boys character
- First appearance: "Who's the Microphone Assassin?" (2003)
- Last appearance: "You Got To Blame The Thing Up Here" (2005)
- Created by: Mike Clattenburg
- Portrayed by: Garry James

In-universe information
- Alias: DVS
- Nickname: DVD (by Ricky)
- Occupation: Rapper
- Home: Sunnyvale Trailer Park, Dartmouth, Nova Scotia, Canada
- Nationality: Canadian

Detroit Velvet Smooth (DVS) (played by Garry James) is an independent rapper who is introduced in Season 3's episode "Who's the Microphone Assassin?" in which DVS is informed by Lahey that J-Roc is violating the copyright of his music. DVS proceeds to crash J-Roc's rap concert at the trailer park and threaten him, but later has a change of heart. In Season 4, DVS joins the Roc-Pile as J-Roc's manager. He does not hail from Detroit, as his name would imply, but rather from Moncton, New Brunswick. Ricky often refers to him as "DVD". Seems to have been killed off some time after season 5 (when his character is no longer seen or mentioned again), as during "Say Goodnight to The Bad Guys" members of the Roc-Pile are seen wearing shirts that say "RIP DVS" when talking to Randy and Julian about the single's dance.

=== J-Roc ===
J-Roc
- Trailer Park Boys character
- First appearance: "Take Your Little Gun and Get Out of My Trailer Park" (2001)
- Last appearance: "Looks Like The Liquor Wins" (2016)
- Created by: Mike Clattenburg; John Paul Tremblay; Robb Wells
- Portrayed by: Jonathan Torrens

In-universe information
- Nickname: Microphone assassin
- Occupation: Rapper; Criminal; Thief; Adult film director
- Home: Sunnyvale Trailer Park, Dartmouth, Nova Scotia, Canada
- Nationality: Canadian

J-Roc (played by Jonathan Torrens), real name Jamie, is a white rapper who perpetuates black stereotypes in his speech and mannerisms. He honestly believes that he is black, and severely detests being called "Jamie". In the third-season episode: "Who's the Microphone Assassin?" he temporarily enters a deep identity crisis when Moncton rapper D.V.S. (Detroit Velvet Smooth) chastises him for imitating his rap, and questions his black identity.

He speaks in caricatured Black Vernacular English and very frequently uses the phrase "You know what I'm saying?" (pronounced, "Knowm sayin'?") He also frequently uses "Motherfuckers" (pronounced, "Ma-fuckas") to refer to things and people in a good-natured way. J-Roc is a close friend of Ricky, Julian, and Bubbles, and is quite friendly and good-natured.

In addition to his musical aspirations, J-Roc, along with his best friend and partner Tyrone (or "T", as he prefers to be called) lead a gang called the "Roc-Pile", which is responsible for some of the criminal activity in the park.

J-Roc and the Roc-Pile often help Ricky and Julian with their money-making schemes, usually by acting as their fence or providing them with extra manpower unless it involves gunfights, at which point they refuse to partake. J-Roc also has several criminal contacts and often provides the lucrative opportunities that the Boys seek. He has also dabbled in the amateur pornography business, directing at least five straight-to-video titles, including "From Russia With The Love Bone", "The Bare Pimp Project", "Cheerie-Hoes", "Fire Hoes", and "Greasy Trailer Park Girls Gone Wild".

During the sixth and seventh season, J-Roc and T father children with two different women and, unable to tell whose child is whose, they agree to raise them together as "co-daddies". As a result, J-Roc puts his rap career on hold to focus on being a parent, although he does continue his criminal activities.

After the series was relaunched on Netflix with the eighth season, J-Roc's and T's children were not seen again, and their current whereabouts remained unknown. However, beginning in the ninth season, J-Roc raises another illegitimate son of his, a mixed race boy who often acts disrespectful towards his father due to him being white. In the first episode of the eleventh season (around 14 minutes into the episode), it is revealed that J-Roc and his son have taken off to live somewhere else, and T is seen managing a cell phone business and is now successful.

=== Sam Losco ===
Sam Losco
- Trailer Park Boys character
- First appearance: "Mrs. Peterson's Dog Gets Fucked Up" (2001)
- Created by: Mike Clattenburg; John Paul Tremblay; Robb Wells; Barrie Dunn
- Portrayed by: Sam Tarasco

In-universe information
- Nickname: The Caveman
- Occupation: Veterinarian; Amateur porn star Paver
- Spouse: Barb Lahey
- Nationality: Canadian
- Residence: Sunnyvale Trailer Park, Dartmouth, Nova Scotia, Canada

Sam Losco or "The Caveman" (played by Sam Tarasco) first appears in the first season. Initially a veterinarian, Sam loses his medical licence after helping Ricky fix a bullet wound, as veterinarians are not supposed to operate on humans. In Season 2 Sam runs for the post of Trailer Park Supervisor, in order to get a new job and to get revenge on Ricky and Julian. He loses to Jim Lahey after Julian slips hallucinogenic mushrooms into his food before his campaign speech. He later attempts to marry Barb Lahey in a plot to gain partial ownership of the trailer park. Sam's efforts are foiled by Julian, who tricks him into starring in one of J-Roc's porn films that is passed on to Barb. Sam attempts to kill J-Roc and Julian as revenge, but is arrested by the police. In Season 4, Sam is able to restart his veterinary practice (on probation) and Bubbles often brings his kitties to him for their checkups. Despite his hatred of the Boys, he will frequently, albeit reluctantly, help the duo under coercion.

His favourite food seems to be greasy hot dogs, and several characters have insultingly called him a "caveman" for his general resemblance to a stereotypical Neanderthal; Sam will become hostile whenever this happens. In Season 6 Sam has apparently lost his veterinary practice again and works at East Coast Paving, until he is fired after a prank-call from Ricky. In season 6's final episode, he kidnaps Randy at gunpoint, believing he had caused him to lose the paving-company job. In season 7, he sends secret-admirer love letters to Barb Lahey; in episode 7 he reveals himself as her secret admirer and she leaves Jim to elope with Sam. In the season finale, Say Goodnight to the Bad Guys, Sam robs Julian's DeLorean, which contained all the money they had earned in season 7's train-smuggling operation; the police pull him over and confiscate the money.

In season 8, Sam rides around with Cyrus and assists him with his unsuccessful plans to buy out the trailer park. In season 9, Sam is homeless and living in a cave. This completes the metamorphosis of Sam actually being a caveman. He is soon discovered to be the "samsquanch" that Bubbles and Ricky ended up tracking down. At the end of the season finale, Sam is shot with a tranquilizer gun by forest rangers and taken away in a pickup truck presumably to be studied. However, in Season 10 he becomes fairly wealthy, waving off crime from a promise he made after his mother died, inherits money, and owns a Dentist's building called "The Denture King" which the boys rob as well.

=== Trinity Collins ===
Trinity Collins
- Trailer Park Boys character
- First appearance: "Take Your Little Gun and Get Out of My Trailer Park" (2001)
- Created by: Mike Clattenburg, John Paul Tremblay, Robb Wells
- Portrayed by: Jeanna Harrison-Steinhart

In-universe information
- Full name: Trinity Collins (née LaFleur)
- Nickname: Trin
- Occupation: Bar tender
- Family: Ricky LaFleur (father); Lucy (mother); Randy Jr. (half-brother)
- Spouse: Jacob Collins (husband)
- Children: Mo (son)
- Nationality: Canadian
- Residence: Sunnyvale Trailer Park, Dartmouth, Nova Scotia, Canada

Trinity Collins (played by Jeanna Harrison-Steinhart) is Lucy's daughter by Ricky, although there are occasional hints throughout the series that Julian is her biological father.

She is beloved by both men; Ricky in particular has proven willing to do almost anything for her. Portrayed as a sweet grade-schooler in the first season, Trinity becomes less innocent and more troublesome as the series progresses. Despite Ricky's frequent absences from Trinity's life, they manage to maintain a loving father-daughter relationship.

In the eighth season, she first informs Julian that she is pregnant with a child; it is later revealed that the father is Jacob Collins. In the ninth season, she gives birth to the child, who, due to a mistake in filling out the paperwork, is named "The Motel”. In the tenth season, she marries Jacob Collins in a hospital emergency room where Ricky lies in a coma.

Born in Nova Scotia, Jeanna started acting on the show at 6 years old, and has been doing it since 2001. After the show's Season 8 revival, Trinity has a larger role in the show.

=== George Green ===
George Green
- Trailer Park Boys character
- First appearance: "Fuck Community College. Let's Get Drunk and Eat Chicken Fingers" (2001)
- Last appearance: "Angel Shit Sent Down From Jesus God" (2018)
- Created by: Mike Clattenburg, John Paul Tremblay, Robb Wells, Barrie Dunn
- Portrayed by: George Green

In-universe information
- Occupation: Police officer
- Nationality: Canadian
- Residence: Dartmouth, Nova Scotia, Canada

George Green (played by George Green) is the local police officer most often dispatched to deal with Ricky and Julian, who easily fool him; he very rarely makes a successful police raid and hustles somebody off to jail.

In Season 6, it is revealed that he was Lahey's partner in the 1970s and he was the one who found Lahey covered with liquor after a fight with the boys, forcing him to resign from the force. The Boys and Lahey frequently describe Green as a "stupid or dumb cop", but the reason they fool him so easily is that because of his history with Lahey, he can't believe anything Lahey says, and chooses to believe Ricky, Julian, or whoever else names Lahey as the source of the problem. In season 7, Green and Ted Johnson attempt to murder Lahey (who was reinstated as a police officer) after he declines to file a search warrant that would have implicated J-Roc and Julian for stealing luggage at the airport. They also attempt to murder Randy and Phil Collins after they witnessed the event. With the help of Ray and the Boys, Lahey frames them for police brutality and they are dismissed and incarcerated for five years. In season 8, Green is seen out of jail, working as Head of Security at the local mall, and living with Lucy. Unknown to the Boys and Lahey, Green was reinstated and tasked with surveilling the park for illegal activity - basically performing Lahey's role of the previous seven seasons. In season 11, he has been named Chief of Police, but ends the season arrested for corruption by an investigation masterminded by Ted Johnson. By Season 12, Green is out of jail but has lost everything. Coaxed by Randy, Lahey reluctantly hires him as an assistant trailer park supervisor, and Green uses his position to investigate Ricky, Julian, and Bubbles for their criminal activities. Lahey eventually fires him due to his abusive treatment of Randy.

=== Cyrus MacDougall ===
Cyrus MacDougall
- Trailer Park Boys character
- First appearance: "Take Your Little Gun and Get Out of My Trailer Park" (2001)
- Last appearance: "George Green: Industrial Cock Inhaler" (2015)
- Created by: Mike Clattenburg, John Paul Tremblay, Robb Wells
- Portrayed by: Bernard Robichaud

In-universe information
- Occupation: Criminal
- Nationality: Canadian
- Residence: Sunnyvale Trailer Park, Dartmouth, Nova Scotia, Canada

Cyrus MacDougall (played by Bernard Robichaud) is the Boys' nemesis. He is a bully and criminal who enjoys waving his Beretta 92 around to terrorize the trailer-park residents. He is introduced in the series premiere, in which he has assumed control of the park by threatening to shoot anyone who opposes him. Julian later drives him from the park, exposing him as a coward. Like Ricky, Cyrus is a high-school dropout. In Season 2 he attempts to get his Grade 10 along with Ricky, but fails after he is caught (and exposed by Ricky) using Jacob to cheat on the exam. Cyrus attempts to kill Ricky as revenge, but is arrested by the police. Cyrus drives a red 1978 Corvette, which he proudly keeps in pristine condition, although the Boys vandalize it in Season 4. In Season 5, he partners with Ricky's childhood friends Terry and Dennis in Season 5 to grow and sell hash, but the Boys steal it. Cyrus, along with Terry and Dennis, is arrested after a gunfight ensued in a failed attempt to get the hash back. Lahey and Randy bail the trio out in a last-ditch attempt to kill Bubbles, Julian and Ricky. After a massive gunfight in the trailer park, Cyrus is seemingly jailed for good. He re-appears in the final special "Say Goodnight to the Bad Guys"; after attempting to steal money and dope from the boys, he is sent back to jail for violating his probation. In Season 8, he teams up with Sam Losco in an unsuccessful attempt to buy out the trailer park. Cyrus reappears in Season 9 when Julian rebuffs his request to get back his collection of porn films at a rundown motel converted into a storage facility that Julian purchased; Cyrus is later framed for burning down the motel and is once again imprisoned. Cyrus' main character trait is his tendency to end every conversation (or confrontation) with the same line: "Fuck off, I got work to do." He is also heard listening to the same song in the car "I'm Old, You're Young" by Rick Jeffery every time he enters or leaves an area. His speech patterns, patois, and overall style are most similar to Andrew Dice Clay (minus the sense of humor), however, the Boys mention they thought he was ripping off the style of Fonzie.

=== Ted Johnson ===
Ted Johnson
- Trailer Park Boys character
- First appearance: "Who the Hell Invited These Idiots to My Wedding?" (2001)
- Created by: Mike Clattenburg, John Paul Tremblay, Robb Wells, Barrie Dunn
- Portrayed by: Jim Swansburg

In-universe information
- Occupation: Police officer
- Nationality: Canadian
- Residence: Dartmouth, Nova Scotia, Canada

Ted Johnson (played by Jim Swansburg) is the detective officer who arrested Ricky LaFleur at his wedding to Lucy in the last episode of the first season. He returns in the fifth season as George Green's replacement, and in the sixth season as an officer along with Green, then back to being a patrol officer. In the sixth season, it is revealed that he is gay and he becomes involved with Randy, but their relationship apparently ends in the season finale after his disappointment of Randy's attempt to jail the Boys with stolen evidence. Johnson is much more difficult to deceive than Green, but like Green he is sentenced to five years for police brutality on Ray, which was entirely set up by Lahey and Ray. He is eventually reinstated in the police force after serving his jail term.

=== Philadelphia Collins ===
Philadelphia Collins
- Trailer Park Boys character
- First appearance: "Rub n Tiz'zug" (2004)
- Last appearance: Don't Legalize It (2014)
- Created by: Mike Clattenburg
- Portrayed by: Richard Collins

In-universe information
- Nicknames: Phil; Mustard Tiger
- Occupation: Owner of The Dirty Burger; Motel owner Taxi driver
- Children: Jacob Collins (son); Thomas Collins (son); Trinity Collins (daughter-in-law)
- Nationality: Canadian

Philadelphia "Phil" Collins (played by Richard Collins) is known mostly for his obesity and burps. Though he is always referred to as "Phil Collins", nobody except Sam Losco and Randy seem to make the connection between him and the musician of the same name; Sam is eager to use the musician's song titles as epithets toward him ("Drive, 'Easy Lover,' drive!"), and at one point using the term, "Sussudio Motherfucker". Others have nicknamed him "Lord Of The Onion Rings", "Mustard Tiger", "Bologna Tugboat", and "The Human House"; J-Roc referred to him as "that snuffleupagus, walrus-ass manatee Phil Collins". Phil has appeared as a greasy motel owner, a taxi driver, and Lahey's paving assistant. He is paranoid about people looking at his belly, which Ricky calls "the biggest, most powerful gut anyone has ever seen"; the fact that Phil always wears undersized shirts makes his gut more obvious. He belches loudly when hit in the stomach. Phil is known for his zany catchphrases which include "Peanut butter and jam!" and "Green eggs and ham!" He and Randy share a genuine friendship fueled by a shared love of cheeseburgers. In Season 7 he and Randy open a cheeseburger restaurant, the Dirty Burger, which they run out of Losco's RV. Phil is the father of Jacob and Thomas Collins. Richard Collins, who played Philadelphia Collins, died on April 15, 2013, during the filming of Don't Legalize It, which marked his final appearance; the character's absence is not explained in the series.

The name Philadelphia Collins was used in later episodes as a way for the writers to avoid infringing on the pop singer's name and brand.

=== Treena Lahey ===
Treena Lahey
- Trailer Park Boys character
- First appearance: "What in the Fuck Happened to Our Trailer Park"; June 23, 2002
- Last appearance: "The Bare Pimp Project"; August 4, 2002
- Created by: Mike Clattenburg; John Paul Tremblay; Robb Wells; Barrie Dunn
- Portrayed by: Elliot Page (Note: Credited as Ellen Page)

In-universe information
- Occupation: Schoolgirl
- Family: James "Jim" Lahey (father); Barb Lahey (mother)
- Home: Sunnyvale Trailer Park, Dartmouth, Nova Scotia, Canada
- Nationality: Canadian

Treena Lahey (played by Elliot Page (Note: Credited as Ellen Page)) is Jim and Barbara Lahey's daughter, who appears regularly in season 2. Although her father warns her against associating with the Boys, she quickly develops a friendship with Ricky after he fixes her bicycle. She is also good friends with Bubbles and Julian and often seeks solace with them during her parents' less-reasonable periods. However, the Boys are forced to distance themselves from Treena after her interactions cause Lahey to call the police, who nearly discover their marijuana grow op. Despite Barb becoming a regular Sunnyvale resident in season 4, Treena is never seen after season 2, but Jim mentions her in season 4's "Propane, Propane" when he proposes remarriage to Barbara. In season Eleven, after it is implied that Ricky is Lahey's son (and therefore, Treena's half-brother), Lahey mentions that "... I already have one kid who won't talk to me 'cause of liquor."

=== Marguerite Murphy ===
Marguerite Murphy
- Trailer Park Boys character
- First appearance: "Why in the Fuck Is My Trailer Pink?"; Trailer Park Boys; March 27, 2015
- Last appearance: "Shoot For The Clouds"; Trailer Park Boys: Jail; March 4, 2021
- Created by: Robb Wells; JP Tremblay; Mike Smith; Jonathan Torrens
- Portrayed by: Marguerite McNeil

In-universe information
- Occupation: Retired
- Nationality: Canadian

Marguerite Murphy (played by Marguerite McNeil) is a disgruntled elderly resident of the trailer park who first appears in the eighth season when Netflix revived the series. She often curses whenever she is seen onscreen and dislikes being disturbed. In the twelfth and final season, she hires Ricky to put in a towel rack, however during the job, Ricky accidentally cuts the power of the house and breaks open holes in the walls. A furious Marguerite lays into Ricky over his performance. In the eleventh season, she is promoted to main cast status. It is revealed in the twelfth season that she is 82 years old.

=== Reggie ===
Reggie
- Trailer Park Boys character
- First appearance: "The Jack Your Cock Furry Whore Slut" (2017)
- Created by: Robb Wells; John Paul Tremblay; Mike Smith
- Portrayed by: Michael Kennedy

In-universe information
- Nickname: The Reg
- Occupation: Scrapyard owner
- Nationality: Canadian

Reggie Rose (played by Michael Kennedy) is a friend of Ricky's who owns a scrapyard. He is best known for his inability to speak without making references to bestiality such as ".. faster than a hooker going down on a billy goat" or calling the boys "turtle jerkers". Ricky often refers to him as "The Reg" and in season 12 is the middle-man for a drug deal where Ricky sells hallucinogenic mushrooms to Terry and Dennis.

== Recurring characters ==
=== "Shitty" Bill ===
"Shitty" Bill (played by Brian Huggins) is a local scrap-metal operator who helps Bubbles with his shopping-cart salvaging plan. His nickname goes back to childhood, when an attempted fart turned into defecation. According to Bubbles, Bill considers his nickname offensive—not the "Shitty" part, but "Bill". His first appearance is in season 5, and he is frequently mentioned in season 7, often acting as the Boys' liaison outside the park. He rarely speaks beyond monosyllabic noises.

=== Bottle Kids ===
The Bottle Kids are a gang of young children or teenagers who amuse themselves by bombarding various park residents with empty liquor bottles, an abundant commodity in Sunnyvale. Randy is a frequent target due to his obesity and lack of a shirt; he mostly bears the strain of their attacks. The park residents have long since learned to be on guard for their attacks; their appearances are always preceded by somebody shouting: "Bottle kids!", causing everyone in the vicinity to seek cover. The residents of Sunnyvale seem to have accepted the bottle kids as a part of daily life in the park, as often a bottle-kid attack is simply waited out, with the residents casually returning to what they were doing before the attack as soon as it ends. In Season 5, Trinity joins their ranks; watching her in action alongside the others, Jim Lahey muses, "What's wrong with parents these days?".

Throwing bottles is likely a rite of passage in the Sunnyvale Trailer Park, as Ricky often comments that he also threw bottles as a child. And as mentioned previously Trinity also began throwing bottles at a certain age. When Ricky is listing the allegedly fun things he would like his grandson to do while living in Sunnyvale he mentions that he would like his grandson to throw bottles. This may indicate that bottle throwing is a rite of passage all Sunnyvale kids are expected to go through.

=== Candy ===
Candy (played by Karen LeBlanc) is a woman Julian meets at a bank when Ricky attempts to get a loan. In the season 1 finale, she appears ready to move into a trailer with Julian, but at Ricky and Lucy's wedding, the Boys are arrested. Candy appears again in season 12, now a Crown prosecutor in Julian's trial for shoplifting. After Julian is found to be innocent, Candy romantically pursues him. She proposes marriage when they have lunch at a Chinese restaurant, and he accepts. She later breaks their engagement, over the phone, when she discovers another of Julian's criminal schemes.

=== Candy ===
Not to be confused with Julian's girlfriend from the first season, Candy (played by Candy Palmater) is a character introduced in Season 10 as a jail mate of Barb's and Donna's. After the three of them were released, they formed what appears to be a lesbian biker gang with the intent of winning back ownership of the trailer park from Julian. Candy is overweight and extremely aggressive, threatening anyone and everyone with physical violence. She is especially hostile towards Randy, and it is implied that at one point she actually sodomized him with a frozen fish. Her sexual relationship with Barb is occasionally mentioned, making Barb one of the many bisexual characters appearing on the show, including Lahey and Randy.

=== Thomas Collins ===
Thomas Collins (played by Mike O'Neill), Phil Collins' other son, made his first appearance in Season 7's episode, "The Mustard Tiger". He drives a 1967 "RS Camaro". He is very protective of his brother Jacob, always trying to keep him away from the trouble he believes will result from associating with Julian. He is later revealed as an aggressive brute, pushing Ricky up to trailer walls, grabbing Julian's collar, and fighting with Sam Losco.

=== Donny ===
Donny (voiced by Mike Smith, portrayed by Dino Ninos) is a previously-unseen trailer park resident who frequently screams profanity off-camera, usually in reaction to the Boys' antics. Most commonly, he can be heard screaming "What in the fuck!" whenever something goes wrong and "Fuck off with the guns!" whenever the Boys engage in a gunfight. Occasionally he screams longer monologues, such as in "A Man's Gotta Eat". In Season Seven, Donny can be heard screaming "Have another drink, Ray!" when Ray crashes into a tree. Donny can also be heard screaming in jail when the inmates' movie night gets cancelled in Trailer Park Boys: The Movie. In the hour-long Christmas Special, he is heard screaming, "Brenda, you shut the fuck up!", revealing that he has a wife. Donny finally appears in Season Eleven, when Randy finds him passed out in his yard. He is revealed to be an older, thin white man with white hair; however, his face is blurred out and he does not speak. In later seasons, he is seen interacting with various members of Sunnyvale and talking to them directly on the camera, but his face remains blurred.

=== Dennis and Terry ===
Dennis and Terry (played by real-life brothers Mio Adilman and Nobu Adilman) are Japanese-Canadian brothers who use their grandmother's house as a cover to deal hash. They debuted in Season 5's opening episode, "Give Peace a Chance". Ricky has known them since childhood, but Julian and Bubbles don't like them much because they abuse their grandmother's trust; also, they habitually stroll around the house wearing only bathrobes and not keeping their private parts covered. They quickly become enemies of the Boys after revealing that they work with Cyrus. At the end of Season 5, they are imprisoned with Cyrus. Terry and Dennis, and Cyrus, re-appear in the episode "Shit Blizzard", seeking revenge for their stolen hash and car. At the end of Trailer Park Boys: Countdown to Liquor Day, they materialize with Cyrus and other characters. Terry and Dennis later reappear in Season 12, when they buy hallucinogenic mushrooms from Ricky.

=== Garry ===
Garry (played by Kim Dunn, real-life brother of Barrie Dunn) is a mall manager, then security chief who is often at odds with the Boys, especially Bubbles, whose cart operation frequently interferes with Garry's duties. Garry is also seen as a liquor store clerk in the Season 3 episode "The Delusions of Officer Jim Lahey".

=== Levi and Desiree ===
Levi (Ardon Bess) and Desiree (Sandi Ross) are an aging couple, seemingly the most prosperous people in the trailer park, who appear in season 1. Levi works in the waste management business and got Ricky his first job when he hired him as a garbage truck driver, then promptly fired him for crashing the truck while driving drunk. They are also referred to as Julian's foster parents, who raised Julian after they found him abandoned in the trailer park. They are never seen or mentioned after season 1 and the "orphan" backstory seems to have been passed to Bubbles.

=== Linda ===
Linda (Linda Busby) is J-Roc's mother. She first appears with Mr Lahey and Randy during J-Roc's filming of "From Russia With the Love Bone", when she grounds him for his actions. She usually disapproves of her son's style and mocks him. In the episode "Who's the Microphone Assassin?" she accidentally walks in on J-Roc while he's masturbating. Later, after J-Roc second-guesses his "blackness", she tries to convince him that he is indeed the microphone assassin and encourages him to perform in his rap concert. She further brightens his mood by revealing that she has had relationships with black men in the past, and he might have biological Afro-Caribbean roots. In season 2's third episode, J-Roc is able to allow Julian to open a nightclub in his and his mom's trailer while she's in Moncton for two weeks.

=== Erica Miller ===
Constable Erica Miller (Shauna MacDonald) is a police officer who falls for Julian in Season 3, hoping that he would leave his criminal life behind. She later realizes that Julian will never change and arrests him. In the Season 4 episode "A Man's Gotta Eat", she briefly appears as an undercover cop as part of a prostitution sting.

=== Susan ===
Susan (Susan Kent) first seen as a sharp-foul-mouthed hockey stepmother in Season 11, she became Ricky's "girlfriend" in Season 12. She's just as hot-tempered as Ricky but has a normal job and a long-term relationship (16 years, according to her own words in Episode 1). She contracted Chlamydia and accused Ricky of giving it to her. She later reveals that she found out her partner contracted it while cheating and passed it to her and gets back with Ricky.

=== Mrs. Peterson ===
Mrs. Peterson (Alma Godwin, d. 2004) is an elderly park resident who mistakenly believes Julian is her grandson; Julian genuinely cares for her as though she really were his grandmother. She lives alone with her dog Sparky and her sole appearance is in the Season 1 episode "Mrs Peterson's Dog Gets Fucked Up". She never reappears after this episode, as the actress died during the show's run, although she's occasionally mentioned throughout the series. Mrs Peterson is not to be confused with Julian's actual grandmother, who is also mentioned on several occasions. It has been pointed out that John Paul Tremblay's character in the short film The Cart Boy is named Jason Peterson, perhaps suggesting that he is the real grandson of Mrs Peterson.

=== Officer Karen ===
Officer Karen (Novalea Buchan), is usually the second officer with Officer George Green and appeared mostly in Season 4. She escorted Randy back to Mr Lahey's car while George Green told Mr Lahey a "shit wolf" fable. She also helped drag Mr Lahey and Randy out of Sam Losco's veterinarian's office in Season 4's episode 5, "Conky" after they had been shot with tranquilizer darts. Ricky and friends came up with a plan to deceive Green and Robin by putting dog urine on their groin areas and say "they were drunk as fuck, and passed out pissing themselves." Karen also arrested J-Roc after he said he was on crack-cocaine and escorted him to the police which would later turn out to be the next "album cover" according to his manager at the time, Detroit Velvet Smooth.

=== ROC-Pile ===
Mr. Finch (Martin Finch), is usually seen in the background with J-Roc, T, and DVS, as support. Other members seen and mentioned but uncredited are "Hydro", "Mr Green", “Kajijojiji” and "Dirt Raskal". Finch was never credited as a speaking role in Season 1, Season 9, 10 and the movie "Don't Legalize It". Mr Finch has appeared in every season of Trailer Park Boys. Tyrone and Mr Finch released a hip hop album called "Stuck in da 90's" located on CDBABY.Com

== Celebrity appearances ==
- Jeremy Akerman - Prosecutor in the trial in episode 16 "If I Can't Smoke and Swear I'm Fucked". Mr. Akerman was the leader of the New Democratic Party of Nova Scotia at one time and was an amateur actor in many productions. He returned to play a judge in both Trailer Park Boys: The Movie, as well as Season 12, Episode 6 'Flow Me The Money'.
- Cecil Wright - Noted sports commentator on East link TV and baseball coach was a customer at the illegal gas bar in the park.
- Doug Barron (aka Hal Harbour / Deputy Douglas) - (Actor/Radio Personality/Technical Director) - Played "Channel 10 Reporter" in episode number 8 "Jim Lahey Is a Drunk Bastard", and newsman "Steve Rodgers" in episode number 42 "High Definition Piss Jugs".
- Alex Lifeson (from the band, Rush) — played himself in the episode "Closer to the Heart". Lifeson also made an appearance as a police officer in both Trailer Park Boys: The Movie and Trailer Park Boys: Countdown to Liquor Day.
- Brian Vollmer (from the band, Helix) — Vollmer makes a cameo appearance in the extras for the Season 3 DVD and as a John in Countdown To Liquor Day.
- Rita MacNeil (Canadian singer-songwriter) — Played herself in the Season 4 finale, "Working Man", where she and her backup singers were forced to harvest marijuana at gunpoint by Ricky, Julian, and Bubbles. She does not complain; she even sweetly informs Ricky, "Here's a nice one, dear" when handing him a freshly picked dope plant.
- Nancy Regan (Halifax-based journalist) — Played herself in the episode "Working Man".
- Gordon Downie (from the band The Tragically Hip) - Downie makes an appearance in Sunnyvale with Ricky, Julian and Bubbles in the Tragically Hip's music video for "The Darkest One". He also made an appearance as a police officer in the Trailer Park Boys Movie, "The Big Dirty". Downie's latest appearance was in the episode "Say Goodnight to the Bad Guys". He is seen eating a bologna sandwich.
- Maury Chaykin (actor) - Appeared as the chief of police who reinstated Mr. Lahey as an officer on the Season 6 episode "Gimme My Fucking Money or Randy's Dead".
- Sebastian Bach (from the band Skid Row) — In Season 7, Bach plays an exaggerated version of himself. He is a model train enthusiast and the boys' client for their major dope-smuggling scheme. Ricky meets Sebastian at the autograph session of the train convention hard up and looking for dope. Ricky then sells all of his dashboard dope to Sebastian because Sebastian had not had dope like Ricky's since Europe 1988, when Skid Row toured with The Scorpions. Originally supposed to pay cash, Bach convinces them to take $250,000 US worth of cigarettes as payment instead; the deal worked out, and the boys made roughly $450,000 US (which they later lost when Sam and Barb stole Julian's DeLorean in the season finale "Say Goodnight To The Bad Guys"). Bach returns to the show for season 8.
- George Canyon (country music artist) - Appeared during the Season 7 finale as an American park ranger; Ricky, Bubbles, and Julian steal his vehicle and sit on the Canada–United States border.
- Denny Doherty (singer-songwriter) - Played the FBI agent "Ryan Shockneck" in the Season 7 finale. He died soon after filming and the episode was dedicated to him.
- Snoop Dogg (rapper) - A longtime idol of the Boys both in the show and in real life, appears in Season 10, when Julian turns his bar into a casino.
- Tom Arnold (actor) Appears alongside Snoop Dogg & Doug Benson in Season 10, when Julian turns his bar into a casino.
- Doug Benson (actor and comedian) - Appears alongside Snoop Dogg & Tom Arnold in Season 10, when Julian turns his bar into a casino.
- Jimmy Kimmel (talk show host) - Appears on television during episode 6 of Season 10.
- Nathan MacKinnon (hockey player) -Appears in season 11 at Ricky's hockey school.
- Queens of the Stone Age (rock band) - the entire band, featuring Josh Homme and the rest of QOTSA, appear at the end of the first season of the Animated Series, performing a set in Sunnyvale. QOTSA's "Smooth Sailing" also was played during the end credits of Swearnet: The Movie.
- Gerry Dee (Canadian TV actor) played a prison guard named Donny in Trailer Park Boys The Movie. He kicks Ricky out of jail early to prevent him from playing in an upcoming hockey game between the inmates and guards. Ricky eventually finds a way back into prison and beats Donny's hockey team.
