= Trailer Park Boys: Don't Legalize It =

- Theatrical release poster
- Directed by: Mike Clattenburg
- Written by: Mike Clattenburg; Mike O'Neill
- Based on: Trailer Park Boys by Mike Clattenburg
- Produced by: Mike Clattenburg; Barrie Dunn; Michael Volpe
- Starring: John Paul Tremblay; Robb Wells; Mike Smith; John Dunsworth; Patrick Roach; Jonathan Torrens; Lucy DeCoutere; Sarah E. Dunsworth; Tyrone Parsons
- Cinematography: Jeremy Benning
- Edited by: Dean Soltys
- Music by: Blain Morris
- Production companies: Trailer Park Productions; Topsail Productions
- Distributed by: Entertainment One
- Release date: April 18, 2014
- Running time: 95 minutes
- Country: Canada
- Language: English
- Budget: $10 million
- Box office: $2 million

Trailer Park Boys: Don't Legalize It (also known as simply Trailer Park Boys 3) is a 2014 Canadian mockumentary crime comedy film directed by Mike Clattenburg, and based on the Canadian television series Trailer Park Boys. It is the third film in the Trailer Park Boys franchise, and a sequel to Trailer Park Boys: Countdown to Liquor Day (2009). In the film, Ricky (Robb Wells), Julian (John Paul Tremblay) and Bubbles (Mike Smith) attempt a series of get-rich-quick schemes, but are again pursued by Sunnyvale Trailer Park supervisor Jim Lahey (John Dunsworth). The story culminates in Ricky heading to Parliament Hill in Ottawa, where he tries to prevent the legalization of cannabis.

Clattenburg first announced plans of making a third Trailer Park Boys film in May 2012. On an estimated $10 million budget, filming for Trailer Park Boys: Don't Legalize It took place on location in Halifax and Ottawa. The film marks the final appearance of series regular Richard Collins (appearing in the film as Philadelphia "Phil" Collins), who died during filming. In addition to Collins, the film is also dedicated to series regular Brian Huggins (who played Shitty Bill in the television series), and country/folk singer Rita MacNeil.

Trailer Park Boys: Don't Legalize It was released in Canada on April 18, 2014. A fourth and sequel film, Standing on the Shoulders of Kitties: The Bubbles and the Shitrockers Story was released in North America on December 6, 2024.

== Plot ==
The residents of Sunnyvale Trailer Park attend the funeral of Ricky's father Ray, who is believed to have died in a propane explosion. Trailer park supervisor Jim Lahey and his partner Randy attend the service, despite being uninvited; the pair are forced to leave after Lahey expresses his belief that Ray is still alive.

Ricky has purchased a house in a subdivision where he keeps an upscale marijuana growing operation. Lahey has recently suffered a stroke, which he blames Ricky for, and vows to get revenge. With the help of his lackey Jacob Collins who is now serving in the Canadian Army, Julian has developed a new money-making scheme in selling drug-tested urine. Bubbles has been living under J-Roc and Sarah's trailer step for two years due to not being able to find work. J-Roc and Sarah later plan an intervention and tell Bubbles to move out. While Bubbles is packing his things, he receives a letter from Randy which he hangs on to. Bubbles is later attacked by thugs while delivering chicken and sent to the hospital.

Julian warns Ricky that with the potential legalization of marijuana, his growing operation business will become obsolete. Ricky refuses to work for Julian and vows to go to Parliament Hill in Ottawa to protest the upcoming legal action. After visiting Bubbles at the hospital, Julian asks him to work for him. Bubbles accepts the offer after revealing that his letter was from a lawyer saying that his deceased parents left land and a house for him in Kingston. Julian promises to take Bubbles to the place after they finish the job. Jacob later reveals that he has been dishonorably discharged from the Army. After Jacob's father Phil rages at Julian, Bubbles, and Tyrone — who recently ran away from a halfway house — the three steal Phil's food truck, "The Dirty Burger", and make their way to the urine deal, with Julian letting Bubbles drive a separate van. Bubbles then offers Ricky a ride to Ottawa after the transmission in Ricky's car fails.

Lahey and Randy secretly follow the boys on their trip, with the intent of planting cocaine in their vehicles and framing them. While on the drive, Lahey tries some of the cocaine and quickly becomes addicted, which worries Randy. While Bubbles and Ricky are driving in the van, they drive by the now burned down Dirty Burger and watch as police arrest Tyrone; they pick up Julian before the police can find him. Later, Bubbles purposely drives past the turnoff to Montreal where the deal is supposed to happen. When Julian finds out, Bubbles admits that he does not want to be a part of the scheme anymore, and just wants to go to his parents' land. Once they get there, it is revealed that the home of Bubbles's parents is a rundown bus parked next to a lake. Bubbles opts to live there, despite Ricky and Julian's protests; however, at the last minute, he decides to go back with them.

Once they arrive at Montreal, Bubbles and Ricky go to a strip club while Julian waits for his customers; he is then robbed by his arch-rival Cyrus and his accomplices Dennis and Terry. Randy calls the bomb squad on Julian's van, and they discover cocaine in the wheel well. Julian is arrested, but Bubbles and Ricky manage to get away. After finding Lahey and Randy, Bubbles steals their car and drives Ricky to Ottawa. Once at Parliament Hill, Ricky sneaks his way into the building and makes an outrageous speech which gets him pulled out by security. A lawyer then offers to help get him out of jail quickly and obtain a marijuana license. While a police officer takes Ricky and Bubbles away, Lahey, highly intoxicated on liquor and cocaine, knocks the officer unconscious and fights a handcuffed Ricky. After the officer regains consciousness, he tases Lahey.

Now in jail, Lahey reveals that the taser shock reversed his stroke. He is no longer using cocaine and has started a relationship with his cellmate. Bubbles has his parents' bus taken to Sunnyvale where he now resides. Julian has stopped dealing drug-tested urine and has started a relationship with an unnamed woman. Randy has revealed that he is over Lahey and has gone back to hooking. Ricky reveals that his marijuana growing operation is a success, since he is now able to sell marijuana legally. He receives a letter containing a VHS tape, which reveals that his father Ray is still alive and now living in a landfill site in Florida, having performed a life insurance scam.

== Cast ==
- John Paul Tremblay as Julian
- Robb Wells as Ricky
- Mike Smith as Bubbles
- John Dunsworth as Jim Lahey
- Patrick Roach as Randy
- Jonathan Torrens as J-Roc
- Lucy DeCoutere as Lucy
- Sarah E. Dunsworth as Sarah
- Jeanna Harrison as Trinity
- Tyrone Parsons as Tyrone
- Bernard Robichaud as Cyrus
- Sam Tarasco as Sam Losco
- Richard Collins as Philadelphia "Phil" Collins
- Jacob Rolfe as Jacob Collins
- Molly Dunsworth as Girl

== Production ==
Prior to the release of Trailer Park Boys: Countdown to Liquor Day in 2009, creator, Mike Clattenburg confirmed that it would be the final installment and that no additional Trailer Park Boys installments would be made. However, in May 2012, Trailer Park Boys creator Clattenburg announced on his Twitter page that a third and final film in the series was in development. It was announced that this third and final film, titled Trailer Park Boys: Don't Legalize It, would be the final feature-length film in the series. The film marked producers Clattenburg, Barrie Dunn and Michael Volpe's final involvements with the franchise; on July 4, 2013, it was announced that actors Robb Wells, John Paul Tremblay and Mike Smith—who play Ricky, Julian and Bubbles, respectively—acquired the rights to the franchise from the producers. This included rights to the original television series, subsequent specials, the first and second feature films, and all assets and intellectual property rights related to the franchise.

The film had an estimated production budget of $10 million, of which $3.5 million came from the government-owned corporation Telefilm Canada. Filming for Trailer Park Boys: Don't Legalize It was scheduled to begin in October 2012. Principal photography commenced in March 2013 due to scheduling conflicts. "Having to reschedule was actually a blessing in disguise", explained Volpe. "The extra time allows us to get all our financing in place before shooting begins and gives all our creative departments more time to prepare." Filming began on March 17, 2013, first taking place on location in Halifax, Nova Scotia, Canada. Extras, actors and the rest of the crew used The St. Patrick’s-Alexandra, a former school, as a "base camp" while filming in downtown Halifax. Filming in Halifax concluded on April 17, 2013.

On April 20, 2013, the production moved to Ottawa, Ontario, Canada, where filming took place at Parliament Hill during the 4/20 weekend; production commenced on the same day that more than 10,000 people descended on Parliament Hill to protest Canada’s marijuana laws. The team hired Ottawa police for security on the two days of filming. Clattenburg devised a plan to sneak Wells, Tremblay and Smith onto Parliament Hill without being noticed by the 10,000 attendees; at least 50 extras were hired to surround the actors with cameras rolling, though onlookers ultimately uncovered the ruse. No real drugs were used by any of the performers during production.

Trailer Park Boys: Don't Legalize It marks the final film appearance of actor Richard Collins, who played Philadelphia "Phil" Collins in the franchise. Collins passed during the production of the film on April 15, 2013. In addition to Collins, the film is dedicated to Brian Huggins, who played scrap metal picker Shitty Bill in the television series, series regular Bill Parsons, who played one of the Sunnyvale Trailer Park residents, and country/folk singer Rita MacNeil, who appeared in a Season 4 episode. Clattenburg had written a part for Huggins in the film, but the actor was unable to appear due to his deteriorating health. MacNeil had passed on April 16, 2013, one day after Collins's passing.

== Reception ==
As of July 2021, it holds a 46% approval rating on the review aggregator website Rotten Tomatoes from 13 critic reviews.

== Release ==
On October 15, 2013, film distributor Entertainment One confirmed that Trailer Park Boys: Don't Legalize It would be released on April 18, 2014, to coincide with the following 4/20 weekend. The film held red carpet premieres in Toronto on April 3, 2014, and in Halifax on April 16, 2014.

=== Home video releases ===
In Canada, Don't Legalize It was released on DVD and Blu-ray formats on July 29, 2014.
