= Bubs =

Bubs may refer to:

- The musical group the Beelzebubs
- The character "Bubs" from Homestar Runner.
- The character "Bubbles" from The Wire, who is also sometimes addressed as Bubbs
- The character "Bubbles" from Trailer Park Boys
- Bubs, a confectionery brand from Sweden
- Princess Bubblegum, a character whose nickname is P-bubs in the animated television series Adventure Time
