= Bubbles (Trailer Park Boys) =

Fictional character from the Canadian television series Trailer Park Boys

- Trailer Park Boys character
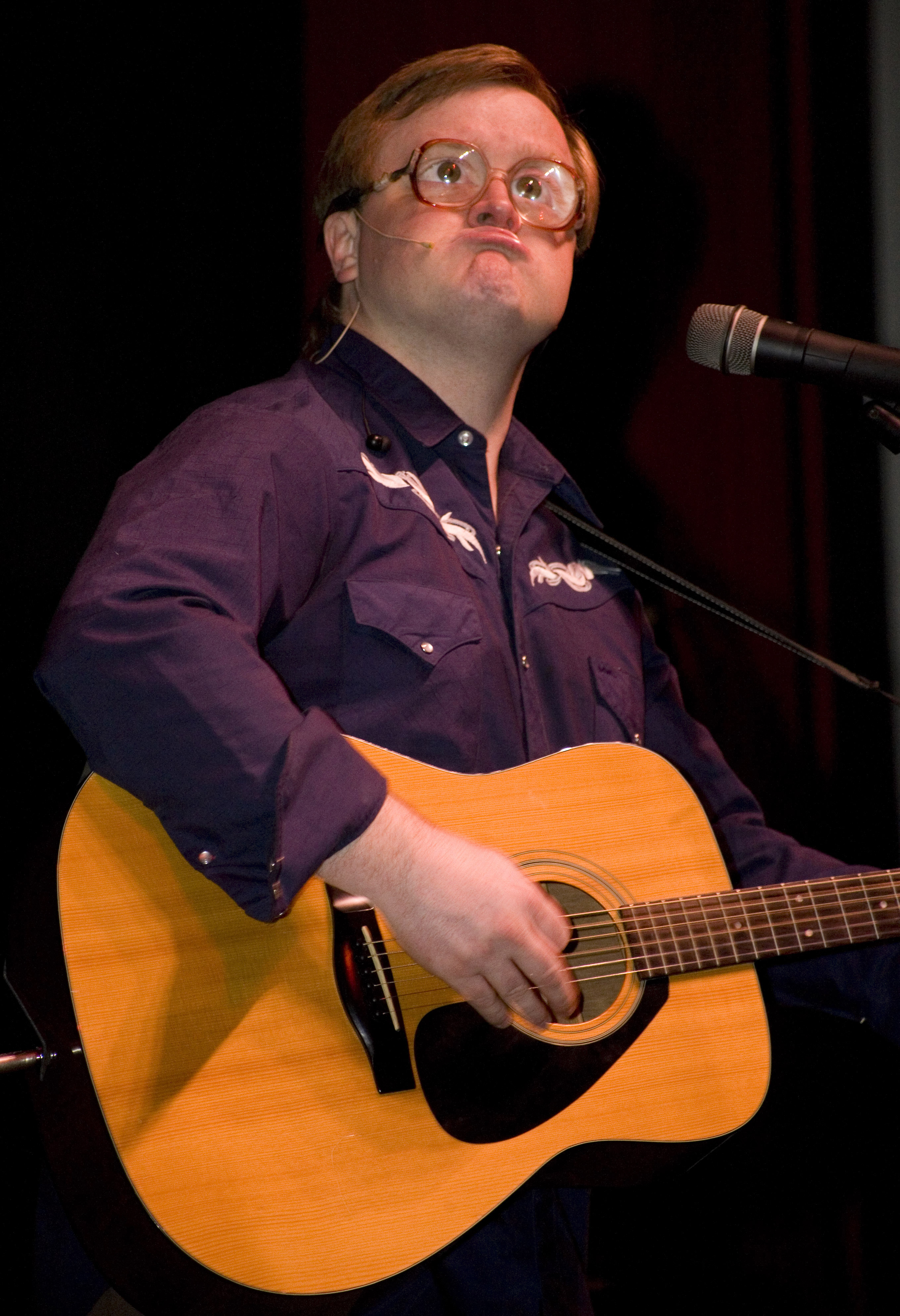
- Mike Smith as Bubbles, April 2009.
- First appearance: "Take Your Little Gun and Get Out of My Trailer Park" (2001)
- Last appearance: TBA
- Created by: Mike Clattenburg; John Paul Tremblay; Robb Wells; Barrie Dunn
- Portrayed by: Mike Smith
- Voiced by: Mike Smith (The Animated Series)

In-universe information
- Alias: The Green Bastard
- Nickname: Bubs
- Occupation: Shopping cart repairer Criminal; Assistant trailer park supervisor Musician; Businessman; Shed and Breakfast owner Hockey player Amateur porn star Professional wrestler Pizza sauce manufacturer and seller Beer manufacturer Podcaster; Mayor of Sunnyvale
- Family: Several pet kitties, Ricky, Julian
- Home: Sunnyvale Trailer Park, Dartmouth, Halifax, Nova Scotia, Canada
- Nationality: Canadian

Bubbles is a fictional character in the Canadian television series Trailer Park Boys. The character is portrayed by Mike Smith. Bubbles is one of the three main protagonists on the show along with Ricky and Julian. He was created by Mike Smith. Bubbles also appears in four feature-length films: Trailer Park Boys: The Movie (2006), Countdown to Liquor Day (2009), Don't Legalize It (2014), and Standing on the Shoulders of Kitties (2024). Bubbles also appears in numerous spin-offs, including Out of the Park: Europe, Out of the Park: USA, and The Animated Series, voiced by Mike Smith.

== Conception and creation ==
Showcase did not initially agree to have Bubbles included in the series. Series creator Mike Clattenburg has stated his belief that if the network had not greenlit the character, the show would not have been a success. Co-star John Paul Tremblay stated that Smith "totally developed that character. He threw those glasses on one day, and we were like, 'Wow. This guy needs to be on the show.'"

One of Bubbles' signtature characteristics are his glasses. Mike Smith recalled their origin: "My girlfriend at the time was in Texas visiting family and they went to an estate sale and she found these glasses. They were 50 cents, and she knew that I would think they were funny because they were so thick, so she bought them as a joke. There was a picture of the old lady who the glasses belonged to, too. She only had 50 cents on her, so she bought the glasses but not the picture. I would love to have that picture."

== Character biography ==
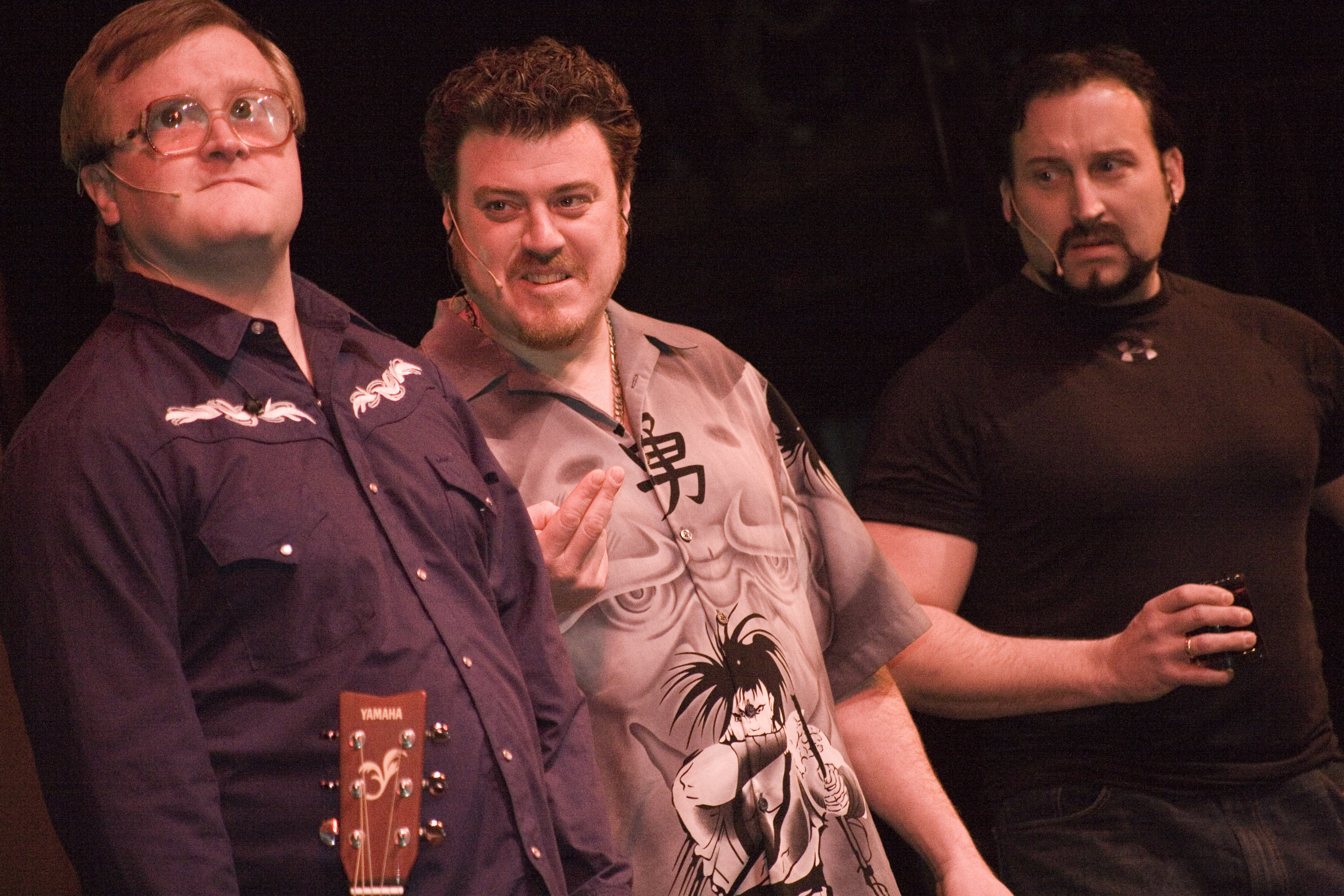
The Boys

Bubbles is the youngest primary character, Julian and Ricky's closest friend, and the series' breakout character. In the first season, like most of the characters in the show, Bubbles maintains a somewhat-reserved demeanour to look good on camera. As the series progresses, he reveals many sides to his personality.

Bubbles' full name is never revealed, and he is simply referred to by hospitals, courts, and other officials as "Bubbles." A Haligonian, he is known for his hoarse Maritimer English, sensitive nature, pearl snap shirts, and thick glasses that magnify his eyes to a considerable degree. These glasses are likely due to aphakia, a condition where the lens in one's eye is missing and that is known for requiring glasses of that strength. Bubbles has never been seen without his glasses, even while sleeping, and in photographs of him as a child.

The episode "Propane, Propane" reveals that Bubbles may be legally blind, as he cannot see how many fingers are held up directly before his face by a truck-driving instructor who admonishes him for not being able to see "jack shit".

Bubbles often acts as the Boys' conscience and tries to be the voice of reason during their misadventures. He is intelligent and has a larger general knowledge than most of the other residents, displaying knowledge of Greek philosophy, classical literature, as well as a strong interest in spaceflight and rocket science, which results in one special episode in which he and the Boys meet Canadian astronaut Commander Chris Hadfield and participate in a spaceflight training simulation. Bubbles regularly chastises Julian and Ricky for being "drunk and on drugs," although he also occasionally consumes marijuana and alcohol (the latter usually when he is depressed). Bubbles gets upset whenever Ricky and Julian fight and he is often forced to act as a peacemaker between the two in such scenarios. He also believes in (and harbors a fear of) Sasquatches (which he calls "samsquanches").

When he was age 6, Bubbles' parents fled the trailer park to escape debt collectors, and he was placed with Julian's grandmother. Bubbles lives in a tool shed with his numerous cats, who are his only family. In Don't Legalize It he acquires a school bus that he inherited from his parents, although it isn't shown or mentioned again by Season 8. Bubbles has taken it upon himself to care for every stray cat in Sunnyvale, including a mountain lion he named Steve French ("If You Love Something, Set It Free").

At the beginning of the series, he makes his living by salvaging shopping carts, repairing them, and selling them back to stores. In later seasons, he attempts to start various legitimate enterprises, which are always promptly usurped by the Boys as fronts for illegal operations and ultimately destroyed. Despite this, he is usually willing to partake in the Boys' various get-rich-quick schemes with only mild objections, because he considers Ricky and Julian to be his only family other than his "kitties." While Bubbles isn't always spared the consequences for their activities (especially in later seasons), he usually is able to escape jail time because Ricky and Julian often cover up his involvement in their schemes when facing arrest. However, Bubbles gets arrested at the end of Season 4 after he was caught driving with a fake license as part of a scheme. He also brings heat upon himself and Julian and Ricky in Season 7, after stealing Patrick Swayze's personal model train while in Maine to arrange a drug deal with singer Sebastian Bach. The theft leads to a $50,000 reward for Bubbles, causing Jim Lahey (at that point reinstated as police officer) to violate their peace treaty to make an attempt to arrest the Boys in the hopes of getting the reward.

Although his life is not always easy, Bubbles takes great pride in being a self-made man and prefers his simple life of independence to any offer of free lodging from his friends. Bubbles has a sentimental, kind nature and often cries when threatened, upset, or moved by kind gestures. The episode "Dear Santa Claus, Go Fuck Yourself" reveals that Julian's grandmother promised Bubbles' parents that Julian would always look after him.

Bubbles dislikes violence and firearms and is often appalled at the dangerous situations that Ricky and Julian get themselves into, but when he is forced into a shootout his firearms of choice are Ak-47 variants, such as the Galil MAR and Type 56 assault rifle. Bubbles' wrestling alter-ego is the "Green Bastard". His favorite band is Rush, and was Alex Lifeson's guitar tech at a concert.

=== Conky ===
Conky
- Trailer Park Boys character
- First appearance: "Conky" (2004)
- Last appearance: "Hurricane Ricky" (2019; The Animated Series)
- Created by: Mike Clattenburg; John Paul Tremblay; Robb Wells; Mike Smith
- Voiced by: Mike Smith

In-universe information
- Species: Puppet
- Occupation: Vaudeville act
- Family: Bubbles
- Home: Swamp

Conky is a ventriloquist puppet that Bubbles claims to have received from a family member who used him in a Vaudeville act (though it is suggested by Julian that Bubbles created the puppet himself). Conky wears a sweater over a flannel shirt, and large glasses similar to those worn by Bubbles. Bubbles treats Conky as a trusted friend, but bestows him with a caustic, annoying, and domineering personality. Conky tends to insult people, especially Ricky; his utterances even shock Bubbles himself. Not long after Bubbles acquired Conky, Ricky and Julian stole Conky and threw him into the local swamp because they were tired of "his" insults and worried about Bubbles' sanity.

In Season 4 Episode 5, the Boys recover Conky to convince Bubbles to go to the hospital to have an infected tooth treated. Conky immediately resumes insulting Ricky and bullying Bubbles. After convincing Ricky not to shoot Conky, Julian shoots Conky "dead," demolishing the puppet's face. Julian and Ricky dispose of the remains in the swamp as a distraught Bubbles looks on.

At the end of Season 7, a stressed-out Bubbles retrieves and restores Conky. During this time, it is implied that Conky might have his own sentient consciousness, as he calls the police on the boys while everyone, including Bubbles, is seemingly asleep. Eventually, Bubbles realizes that he needs to lose Conky for good and "drowns" him. Conky reappears briefly in Season 8, but is not seen nor heard from again afterwards.

In Season 7 Episode 9, Bubbles tells how his grandfather, a Vaudeville ventriloquist, left Conky to him. This could be a retcon for Conky's origin or an indication of Conky's warping influence on Bubbles' sense of reality.

Looper described Conky as the most divisive character in the series.

== Reception and legacy ==
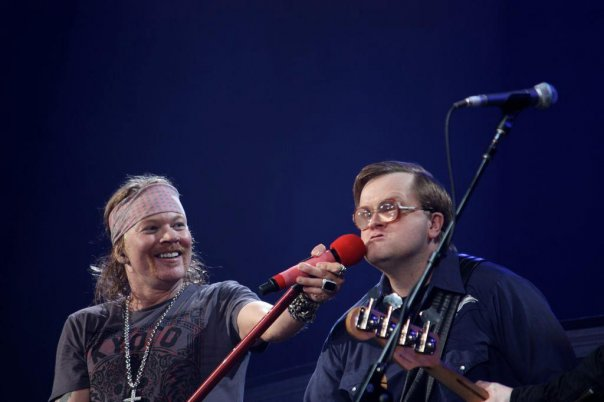
Axl Rose & Bubbles

American musician Axl Rose has been described as a big fan of the series and of Bubbles. Axl brought the character's actor, Mike Smith, on tour with him.

In 2005, Mike Smith in character as Bubbles, along with Robb Wells and John Paul Tremblay as Ricky and Julian, threw out the first pitch at the home opener of the 2005 Toronto Blue Jays season at the Rogers Centre. He appeared on the Barenaked Ladies album Snacktime!. A Trailer Park Boys-themed restaurant was opened in Halifax, Nova Scotia called Bubbles Mansion. It was partly owned by Mike Smith and closed in 2010.

== Departure from Trailer Park Boys ==
In November 2025, Smith was charged by the Halifax Regional Police with sexual assault relating to an incident that allegedly occurred in December 2017. As a result, a statement was released on the official Trailer Park Boys Facebook page confirming that Smith has left the show as a result of the controversy.

== See also ==
- List of Trailer Park Boys characters
