= Trailer Park Boys: Countdown to Liquor Day =

2009 film by Mike Clattenburg

Trailer Park Boys 2: Countdown to Liquor Day (2009)
- Theatrical release poster
- Directed by: Mike Clattenburg
- Screenplay by: Mike Clattenburg; Robb Wells; John Paul Tremblay; Mike Smith; Timm Hannebohm
- Based on: Trailer Park Boys by Mike Clattenburg
- Produced by: Mike Clattenburg; Barrie Dunn; Michael Volpe
- Starring: Robb Wells; John Paul Tremblay; Mike Smith; John Dunsworth; Jonathan Torrens; Patrick Roach; Lucy DeCoutere; Sarah E. Dunsworth; Barrie Dunn; Tyrone Parsons; Jeanna Harrison
- Cinematography: Ted McInnes
- Edited by: Roger Mattiussi
- Music by: Blain Morris
- Production companies: Trailer Park Productions; Topsail Productions
- Distributed by: Alliance Films
- Release date: September 25, 2009
- Running time: 102 minutes
- Country: Canada
- Language: English
- Budget: C$6.6 million
- Box office: C$3 million

Trailer Park Boys: Countdown to Liquor Day (also known as simply Trailer Park Boys 2) is a 2009 Canadian mockumentary black comedy crime film directed by Mike Clattenburg, and based on the Canadian television series Trailer Park Boys. It is the second film in the Trailer Park Boys franchise, following Trailer Park Boys: The Movie (2006). Trailer Park Boys: Countdown to Liquor Day is a conclusion to "Say Goodnight to the Bad Guys", the television special that ended the series after its seventh season. The film follows the characters of Ricky (Robb Wells), Julian (John Paul Tremblay) and Bubbles (Mike Smith) as they return to a life of crime after being released from prison.

Trailer Park Boys: Countdown to Liquor Day premiered in Halifax, Nova Scotia at the 29th Atlantic Film Festival; it was released theatrically in Canada on September 25, 2009. It received mixed reviews; some critics praised it for staying faithful to the television series, while others derided it for its crude humor. Trailer Park Boys: Countdown to Liquor Day grossed over $3 million during its domestic theatrical run. It won an Atlantic Film Festival Award for Best Sound Design, and earned a Genie Award nomination for Best Performance by an Actor in a Supporting Role. Although it was intended to end the franchise, Trailer Park Boys: Countdown to Liquor Day was followed by a third film, Trailer Park Boys: Don't Legalize It, which was released in Canada on April 18, 2014.

== Plot ==
It has been 2 years since the events of the episode "Say Goodnight to the Bad Guys", and Ricky (Robb Wells), Julian (John Paul Tremblay) and Bubbles (Mike Smith) are finally released from prison. Upon returning to Sunnyvale Trailer Park, Bubbles finds that all of his kittens have been sent to an animal shelter and that he will need to pay thousands of dollars in order to have them released; secondly, Ricky and Julian successfully rob a liquor store, but Julian uses all the money to buy a car and refurbish his trailer into an auto-body shop. Ricky's plan is to pass his Grade 12 exam, which he feels will open doors of opportunity for him.

Jim Lahey (John Dunsworth) is sober and has opened up a posh new trailer park while attempting to demolish Sunnyvale. His only problem is that his new sewer line will have to run through Julian's lot; so he tries to convince Julian to move. One sip of beer causes him to revert to heavy drinking. After Randy (Patrick Roach) leaves him and moves out of their trailer and on to Julian's deck, Lahey goes on a liquor-fueled rampage. Meanwhile, the boys experience failure: Julian's auto-body business is failing, Ricky fails his Grade 12 exam, and Bubbles' kittens remain in the animal shelter after a failed attempt to rescue them which results in Tyrone's (Tyrone Parsons) arrest.

Bubbles is told that the kittens will be put down soon unless he can raise the money to have them released. Lahey, drunk again, destroys Ricky's new cannabis growing operation and also demolishes Julian's trailer in an attempt to get Julian to move. However, Lahey's plan backfires as Julian has insured his trailer for $28,000. With nothing left to live for and his dream of operating his new posh trailer park ruined by Julian's refusal to move, Lahey loses his sanity.

The boys decide to rob a bank disguised as security guards making an armored-car transport as a last resort while Julian waits for the insurance check to save Bubbles' kittens. They succeed in obtaining the money from the vault but they are foiled by Lahey showing up at the last minute. Lahey threatens to commit suicide by jumping off the roof of the bank. After Julian prevents this, the real security guards show up. Ricky, Julian, Bubbles, and Randy are arrested and sent back to prison after a car chase with the police and security guards. They receive a short two-week sentence due to their arresting officer being drunk but request not to be filmed anymore. Bubbles' kittens are saved through a therapy animal program at the prison where the cats are released and spend time with the inmates. Bubbles secures a date with the animal control worker who saved his kittens, and the boys presumably return to Sunnyvale, with Julian building a new trailer with the insurance money.

Meanwhile, Lahey is drunk in Cuba, having absconded with the stolen money. Even though he is now rich, he is shown to still be miserable, because he has nobody with whom to share his wealth. J-Roc (Jonathan Torrens) is also shown to have finally reached his goal of becoming a famous rapper, as he has a released new record, and is on stage in front of a large, enthusiastic crowd.

== Cast ==
- Robb Wells as Ricky
- John Paul Tremblay as Julian
- Mike Smith as Bubbles
- John Dunsworth as Jim Lahey
- Patrick Roach as Randy
- Jonathan Torrens as J-Roc
- Lucy DeCoutere as Lucy
- Sarah E. Dunsworth as Sarah
- Barrie Dunn as Ray
- Jeanna Harrison as Trinity
- Tyrone Parsons as Tyrone
- Mary Fay Coady as Jenny
- Jacob Rolfe as Jacob Collins
- Richard Collins as Philadelphia Collins
- Alex Lifeson as Undercover Prostitute #1
- Brian Vollmer as Randy's $15 John
- Sam Tarasco as Sam Losco
- Bernard Robichaud as Cyrus
- Jim Swansburg as Detective Ted Johnson
- George Green as Officer George Green
- Nobu Adilman as Dennis
- Mio Adilman as Terry

== Production ==
=== Development ===
Trailer Park Boys: Countdown to Liquor Day is the second film to be based on the television series Trailer Park Boys, following Trailer Park Boys: The Movie. It was directed by Mike Clattenburg, the creator and director of the series and director of the first film. Countdown to Liquor Day is not a direct sequel to the first film, but a conclusion to "Say Goodnight to the Bad Guys", the final television special that concluded the series. Clattenburg officially announced plans to end the Trailer Park Boys franchise in November 2008. He initially wanted to end the series after the fifth season. Due to popular demand from fans of the series, Clattenburg decided to produce two more seasons for the show. When asked why he chose to end the franchise, Clattenburg stated, "There comes a time I'd like to do more new stuff and develop in different ways."

=== Music ===
The film's music was composed by Blain Morris. The soundtrack also contains “I Fall to Pieces”, performed by Patsy Cline, “Blue on Blue”, performed by Bobby Vinton, “Howlin' For My Baby”, performed by Garrett Mason, “Itchy Jock”, performed by Itchy Ron and Metty the Dertmerchant and “Can't Not Be Feelin' Dis”, performed by JROC.

=== Casting ===
As with the previous film, Countdown to Liquor Day sees the cast from the television series reprise their respective roles.

=== Filming ===
Filming took place on location in Nova Scotia, Canada as well as Cuba.

== Release ==
=== Premiere and theatrical release ===
Trailer Park Boys: Countdown to Liquor Day was released in Canadian theatres on September 25, 2009. Prior to its theatrical release, the film held its world premiere in Halifax, Nova Scotia at the 29th Atlantic Film Festival, where the Sound team from PowerPost won an award for Best Sound Design.

=== Home media ===
In Canada, Countdown to Liquor Day was released in DVD and Blu-ray formats on December 22, 2009. Special features for the film include deleted scenes, extended takes, lost interviews, and behind-the-scenes footage. In the United States, the film was released in the same home video formats on February 23, 2010.

== Reception ==
=== Critical response ===
Prior to its domestic theatrical release, Countdown to Liquor Day divided film critics. Linda Bernard of the Toronto Star wrote that the film was "a celluloid celebration of everything that boys love about being boys; from running around in their underpants, to setting stuff on fire, demolishing structures with heavy machinery and eating fried chicken for breakfast." Stephen Cole of The Globe and Mail awarded the film three stars out of four, writing, "Trailer Park Boys succeeded because they were good company. So they are again in their second movie." Steve Newton of Straight.com stated the film was "the funniest Canadian movie ever made." Norman Wilner of Now Magazine wrote in his negative review, "Even the fans might wonder where the laughs are this time around. Heads get shaved, stuff gets smashed and drinks get drunk, but nothing has much of a payoff." Jay Stone of The StarPhoenix wrote that the film's "shenanigans run out of steam in a hurry, a problem that Countdown to Liquor Day tries to counteract with an episodic structure that flies through several stories, each of them cruder than the last."

=== Box office ===
Trailer Park Boys: Countdown to Liquor Day grossed $1,396,229 on its opening weekend, placing 12th place at the box office. The film dropped 65.33 percent during its second week, earning only $484,072. The film dropped an additional 45.85 percent in its third week, grossing only $262,129 at thirty-second place. In total, Countdown to Liquor Day has grossed $2,941,985 in Canada.

=== Accolades ===
Awards
Award	Category	Recipient	Result
30th Genie Awards	Best Performance by an Actor in a Supporting Role	John Dunsworth	Nominated
29th Atlantic Film Festival	Best Sound Design	Brian Power	Won

== Soundtrack ==
- "I Fall to Pieces" - Patsy Cline
- "Blue on Blue" - Bobby Vinton
- "Lotta Hos Out Tonight" - JROC
- "Howlin' For My Baby" - Garrett Mason
- "Itchy Jock" - Itchy Ron and Metty the Dertmerchant
- "Can't Not Be Feelin' Dis" - JROC

== Sequel ==
In May 2012, Mike Clattenburg announced on his Twitter page that a third and final film in the Trailer Park Boys franchise was in development. Principal photography for the third and final installment was scheduled to begin in October 2012, but was pushed back to March 2013; filming began on March 17, 2013. On April 20, 2013, the production moved to Ottawa, Ontario, Canada, where filming took place at Parliament Hill during the 4/20 weekend. Entertainment One announced that the third and final film, titled Trailer Park Boys: Don't Legalize It, was released in Canada on April 18, 2014.
