= Bernard Robichaud =

American-born Canadian actor and writer (born 1960)

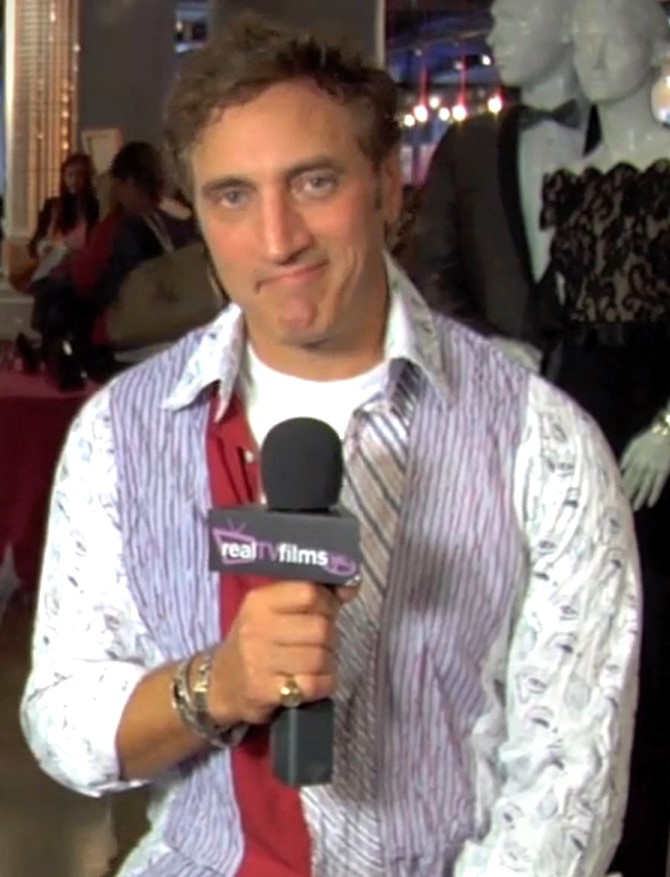
- Robichaud at the 2013 Toronto International Film Festival
- Born: 2 March 1960 (age 66); Boston, Massachusetts, U.S.
- Occupations: Actor writer
- Known for: Trailer Park Boys

Bernard Robichaud (born 2 March 1960) is an American-born Canadian actor and writer who portrays Cyrus on Trailer Park Boys.

== Filmography ==
=== Films ===
Year	Title	Role	Notes
1998	Beefcake	Jukie	
2000	Coo Coo Cafe	Rocko	
2000	Reaper	Killer	
2004	Vendetta: No Conscience, No Mercy	Joey	
2006	Black Eyed Dog	Allan Legere	
2009	Trailer Park Boys: Countdown to Liquor Day	Cyrus	
2010	The Hostage Game	Bob Ferland	
2014	Trailer Park Boys: Don't Legalize It	Cyrus	

=== Television ===
Year	Title	Role	Notes
1993	Lifeline to Victory	Tiffey	Television film
1993	Life with Billy	Store Clerk	Television film
2001	A Glimpse of Hell	Officer No. 2	Television film
2001	The Industry		TV series
2001–2015	Trailer Park Boys	Cyrus	TV series
2005	Ambulance Girl	Biker	Television film
2006	North/South	Dixon	TV series
2006	Hearts of Dartmouth: Life of a Trailer Park Girl	Cyrus	Documentary
2008	Say Goodnight to the Bad Guys	Cyrus	Television film
2009	Blue Seduction	Stanley	Television film
2012–2014	Haven	Kirk Bauer	TV series
