= Trailer Park Boys: The Animated Series =

2019 Canadian animated television series and sitcom

- Genre: Mockumentary; Animated sitcom; Adult animation; Black comedy; Crime comedy
- Created by: John Paul Tremblay; Robb Wells; Mike Smith
- Written by: John Paul Tremblay; Robb Wells; Mike Smith; Norm Hiscock; Michael Rowe
- Voices of: John Paul Tremblay; Robb Wells; Mike Smith; John Dunsworth; Patrick Roach; Cory Bowles; Jeanna Harrison; Jacob Rolfe; Sarah Dunsworth-Nickerson
- Theme music composer: Blain Morris
- Composers: Blain Morris; Marc Mysterio
- Country of origin: Canada
- Original language: English
- No. of seasons: 2
- No. of episodes: 20 (list of episodes)

Production
- Producers: Mike Smith; John Paul Tremblay; Robb Wells
- Camera setup: Multiple-camera
- Running time: 23–26 min.
- Production companies: Sunnyvale Productions; Swearnet Pictures; Entertainment One Television

Original release
- Network: Netflix
- Release: March 31, 2019 – May 22, 2020

Trailer Park Boys: The Animated Series is a Canadian adult animated sitcom created by John Paul Tremblay, Robb Wells, and Mike Smith. The series is a spin-off and sequel to the 2001 television mockumentary comedy series, Trailer Park Boys, itself a sequel to Mike Clattenburg's 1999 film of the same name.

Picking up after the events of the original series' twelfth season, The Animated Series continues to follow the misadventures of a group of trailer park residents, some of whom are ex-convicts, living in the fictional Sunnyvale Trailer Park in Dartmouth, Nova Scotia.

The series premiered on Netflix on March 31, 2019. A second season was released on May 22, 2020.

== Cast and characters ==
=== Main ===
- John Paul Tremblay as Julian
- Robb Wells as Ricky LaFleur
- Mike Smith as Bubbles "Bubs"

=== Recurring cast ===
- John Dunsworth (archive recording) as Jim Lahey
- Patrick Roach as Randy
- Cory Bowles as Himself / Steve French / Naked Man
- Jeanna Harrison as Trinity LaFleur-Collins
- Jacob Rolfe as Jacob Collins
- Sarah Dunsworth-Nickerson as Sarah
- Tyrone Parsons as Himself
- Marguerite McNeil as Marguerite Murphy
- Shelley Thompson as Barb Lahey (season 1)

=== Notable special guests ===
- Nathan MacKinnon as himself (season 1)
- Alex Lifeson as Big Chunk (season 1)
- Josh Homme as himself (season 1)
- Kevin O’Leary as himself (season 1)
- Mark Cuban as himself (season 1)
- Arlene Dickinson as herself (season 1)
- Michael Wekerle as himself (season 1)
- Jay Baruchel as Jason Rucknel (season 1 & 2)
- Edge as Sledge (season 2)

== Production ==
=== Casting ===
John Dunsworth posthumously appears in the series as Jim Lahey, with his daughter Sarah Dunsworth-Nickerson stating on Twitter that excerpts of her father's actual voice were used in the series.

== Episodes ==
=== Series overview ===
Series overview
Season	Episodes	Originally released
1	10	March 31, 2019
2	10	May 22, 2020

=== Season 1 (2019) ===
No. overall	No. in season	Title	Original release date
1	1	"Long Story Short... A Bear Ripped My Cock Off and Ate It"	March 31, 2019
Back in jail, tripping on mushrooms and transformed into cartoons, the boys test the limits of their new reality with both fear and excitement.
2	2	"The Pepperoni Cobra"	March 31, 2019
A tapeworm is taking the grub right out of Ricky's mouth, but when the parasite swipes his weed, that's the last straw. Bubbles connects at the club.
3	3	"The Stanley Bong"	March 31, 2019
Bubbles convinces Julian and Ricky to join him as he stalks Wayne Gretzky. Now they must beat the Moncton Mudslides to win back the Stanley Bong.
4	4	"The Penis Milker"	March 31, 2019
The boys go on a mission to save Steve French; a mountain lion friend, but they don't count on the mosquitoes, bear traps or sperm-harvesting backwoods locals.
5	5	"Big Ho's Carwash"	March 31, 2019
Business and chaos boom as Julian revs up a sexy car wash, Ricky opens a trailer pool, and Bubbles builds his dream shed on a TV show.
6	6	"The Three Mustardteers"	March 31, 2019
Old-school hash brings back memories of grade school, when young Julian, Ricky and Bubbles met, smoked and retaliated against a bully with a pellet gun.
7	7	"Satan's Bastards"	March 31, 2019
Trinity and Jacob want to move, so the boys deliver hash to raise cash. But Ricky gets greedy and incurs the wrath of a rampaging biker gang.
8	8	"Space Weed"	March 31, 2019
When Ricky's grow operations are exposed, an entrepreneur approaches him to cultivate dope in space. Beyond pumped, Bubbles demands to join the team.
9	9	"Hurricane Ricky"	March 31, 2019
To get off the grid, Ricky liberates hundreds of car batteries. Julian concocts a scheme to ride out a big storm, but Mother Nature has other plans.
10	10	"Trailerstock"	March 31, 2019
The boys throw a benefit concert featuring Helix to save Sunnyvale. But how can their event compete with the nearby Queens of the Stone Age show?

=== Season 2 (2020) ===
No. overall	No. in season	Title	Original release date
11	1	"Duber"	May 22, 2020
Ride-sharing hits a new high when Ricky attempts to go legit with a dope-smoking twist on Uber: Duber. But can the gang handle success — and Randy?
12	2	"Viral Video"	May 22, 2020
The viral video cash-in is on. Ricky kidnaps a rank clown for Mo’s birthday party. But when the bozo bails, Cory and Randy step up as party starters.
13	3	"The Tax Man F**ked Me"	May 22, 2020
Sunnyvale’s sketchiest get scammed by grifters posing as tax agents. A trap is set, then lethal farts lead the boys to a familiar face.
14	4	"Scamazon"	May 22, 2020
Bubbles pours his life savings into Kitty Shakes while Julian and Ricky drive off to steal packages. Later, a reality competition comes calling.
15	5	"Clint Eatswood"	May 22, 2020
The gang must rustle up dough to cure Bubbles’s kitten of hookworms, even if that means becoming movie stars. But are the boys ready to play dirty?
16	6	"The First Time We Smoked Weed"	May 22, 2020
The fellas take a shady trip down memory lane back to 1979: the first time they smoked Panama Red — and launched a life of petty crime.
17	7	"Bubbles for Mayor"	May 22, 2020
The city rounds up Bubbles' free-range kitties, and when the mayor kicks him to the curb, he decides to run for office. One paradigm shift coming up.
18	8	"The Bagshank Redemption"	May 22, 2020
After going to jail for peeing on the cops, Ricky claims he’s turning over a new leaf. That means ditching his two best pals to go on a Costco treasure hunt with Cory and Jacob.
19	9	"The F**ket List"	May 22, 2020
Bubbles drags Julian to the fair to cheer him up. After a fortuneteller delivers the bad news, the guys end up in a cult. Time to start drinking.
20	10	"Well Boys, I Guess I Gotta Get Dead"	May 22, 2020
The good times are killing them: A bank error in their favor sends the boys on a spending spree. When the cops arrive, Ricky must fake his own death.

== Reception ==
Rudi Abdullah of Cultured Vultures reviewed the first season, writing that "Trailer Park Boys: The Animated Series utilizes its cartoon format in a handful of successful ways but it doesn't manage to hold a candle to its live action predecessor."
