= Ricky (Trailer Park Boys) =

Richard "Ricky" LaFleur
- Trailer Park Boys character
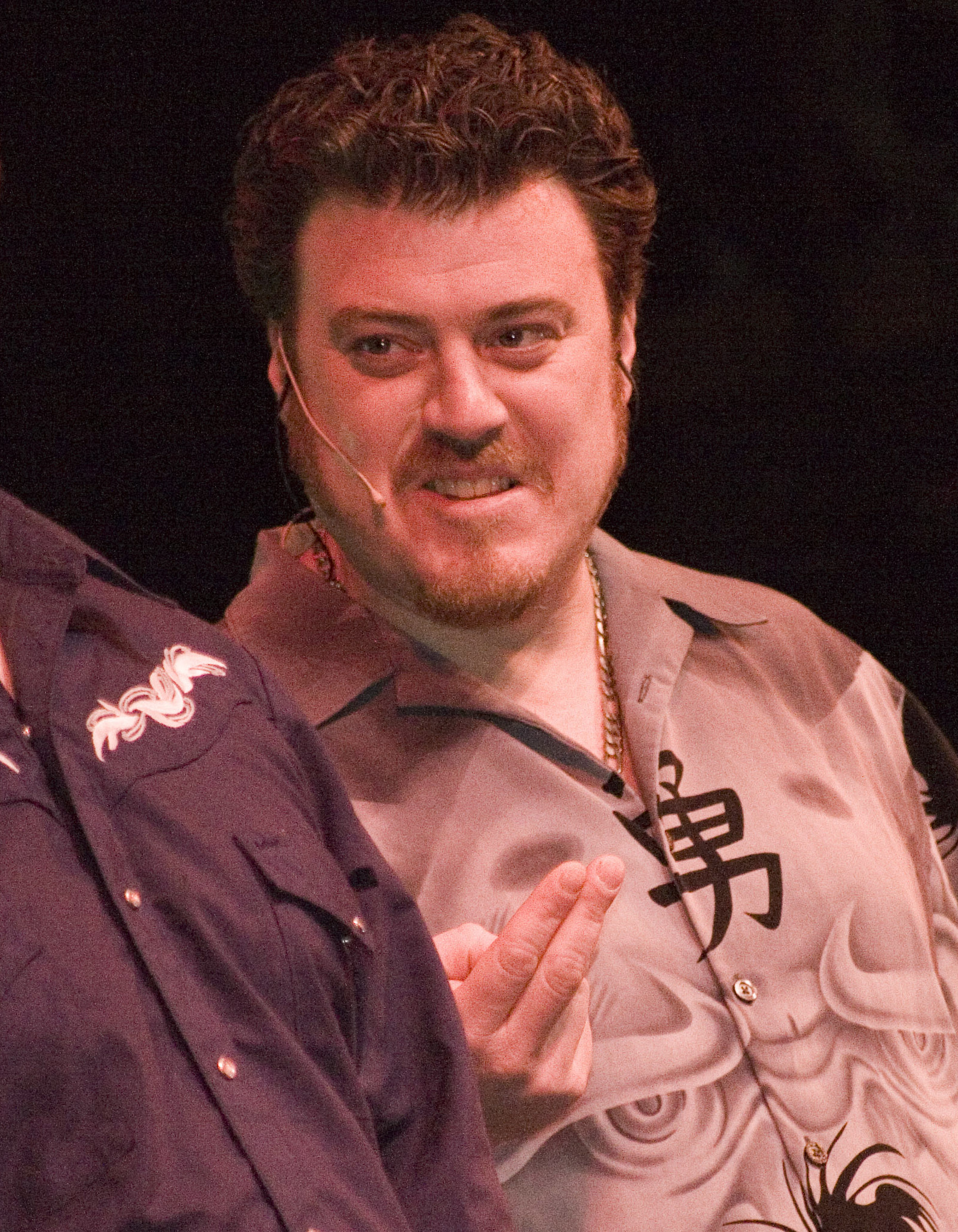
- Wells playing Ricky, April 2009.
- First appearance: Trailer Park Boys (1999)
- Created by: Mike Clattenburg
- Portrayed by: Robb Wells
- Voiced by: Robb Wells (The Animated Series)

In-universe information
- Aliases: Jim Cory Jacob; Randy Jacobson; Randy Lahey; Richard (by Bubbles)
- Nickname: Ricky
- Occupation: Businessman; Criminal; Amateur porn star Handyman; Trailer park supervisor Mall cop Podcaster; Deputy Mayor of Sunnyvale; Temporary Relief Assistant Trailer Park Supervisor; School Janitor; Garbage Man
- Family: Ray Flowers (surrogate father); Tammy (mother); Lucy (ex-girlfriend); Trinity (daughter); Mo Collins (grandson); Jacob Collins (son-of-law); Willy Goat (pet goat); Orangie (pet goldfish)
- Spouse: Lucy
- Significant others: Sarah; Susan; Barbara
- Children: Trinity Collins (daughter)
- Home: Sunnyvale Trailer Park, Dartmouth, Halifax, Nova Scotia, Canada
- Nationality: Canadian

Richard "Ricky" LaFleur is a fictional character in the Canadian television series Trailer Park Boys. He is one of the three main protagonists on the show, along with Julian and Bubbles. Portrayed by Robb Wells, the character was created by series creator Mike Clattenburg. Ricky also appears in five films; two short, and three feature length. Before the show, he appeared in the short films The Cart Boy (1995), and Trailer Park Boys (1999). He appears in the feature-length films: Trailer Park Boys: The Movie (2006), Countdown to Liquor Day (2009), and Don't Legalize It (2014). Ricky also appears in numerous spin-offs, including Out of the Park: Europe, Out of the Park: USA, and The Animated Series, for which the latter Robb Wells voices him.

Season 12's first episode "Chlamydia" officially revealed Ricky's last name to be LaFleur.

== Character biography ==
Ricky is a fun-loving, dim-witted slacker who enjoys marijuana, Jalapeño Potato Chips, pepperoni, chicken chips, licorice, cigarettes, ravioli, chicken fingers, fish sticks, and alcoholic beverages. He is also a fast-talking schemer. His daughter Trinity is a kleptomaniac and his ex-girlfriend, Lucy, is a stripper. He and Julian have been best friends since they were kids.

In the 1999 original black-and-white Trailer Park Boys movie, Ricky used cocaine with his friend Julian, which he references in the first episode of season one: as he is getting out of prison, he tells the camera crew Julian hired that "[Julian]'s the one force-feeding me drugs and every other goddamn thing. ..." Ricky and Julian have been best friends since childhood and are almost codependent, with Ricky relying on his friend to guide him and keep his antics in check. While good-natured towards his friends and family, Ricky is also selfish, foul-mouthed, volatile, and aggressive, and almost always manages to anger, offend, and alienate those around him. He has always been a troublemaker and often refuses to take responsibility for his actions, illegal or otherwise.

He seems to believe that any form of evidence of wrongdoing can be dispensed by simply flinging it into the air from where he is standing or by submerging it in a nearby lake. As a result, the grounds of the trailer park and the lake are littered with evidence of crimes. A lifetime of drinking, smoking dope, shoplifting, vandalism, destruction of property, theft and slacking off have left Ricky with a below-average intelligence, for which he is often ridiculed. Even Ricky considers himself stupid, having repeatedly failed grades before entirely dropping out of school after Grade 9. It is only in Season 2 that Ricky resumes his education; he eventually passes Grades 10 and 11 only to fail Grade 12 in Countdown to Liquor Day. However, he has moments of cleverness and displays practical expertise, as in growing marijuana (at which his skill is unsurpassed), fixing cars, siphoning gas, playing ball hockey, and cooking. He is also extremely adept at fast-talking, negotiating himself and his friends out of seemingly impossible situations with a mixture of quick thinking, confident acting and overwhelming subjects with nonsensical yet somehow credible arguments. Though characters such as Lahey or the police deride him as a loser and a criminal, he's devoted to his friends and family, especially to his daughter Trinity. In the Season 3 premiere, after discovering that he squandered all of his earnings on a successful drug deal from Season 2, Ricky was forced to pick between purchasing his own trailer or buying encyclopedias that he ordered for Trinity; Ricky chose the latter at the expense of having to kiss Lahey's bare buttocks in front of the rest of the trailer park residents after losing a bet with him.

Although he often tries to take the easy way out by breaking the law instead of getting a real job, he occasionally demonstrates dedication to work and education to prove that he's more than a criminal lowlife. Ricky is known for his trademark malapropisms ("Denial and error"; "Catch-23 situation"; "Get two birds stoned at once"; "Worst case Ontario"; "It's clear to see who makes the pants here"; "gorilla see, gorilla do"), dubbed "Rickyisms" by fans. He usually wears black track pants and a Houndstooth patterned shirt and enjoys listening to Canadian '80s rock bands such as Helix, April Wine, and Kim Mitchell. For most of the series, Ricky lives in and drives the "Shitmobile", a dilapidated 1975 green Chrysler New Yorker that used to belong to Julian's grandmother.

To his embarrassment, he resembles the hypnotist Peter Reveen. He has also been compared to Elvis Presley. In season 8, Ricky gets a pet goldfish named "Orangie", who dies because Ricky fills his bowl with alcohol in an attempt to "party" with the fish. Bubbles convinces Ricky that the fish is merely in a deep slumber, eventually employing Jacob and Cory to replace the fish without Ricky's knowledge. For the remainder of the season, Bubbles keeps a supply of "Orangies" in his shed as replacements as Ricky repeatedly kills his pet.

In season 9, Ricky acquires a pet baby goat, which he names "Willy Goat"; Ricky also becomes a grandfather in season 9 when Trinity gives birth to a son, The Motel, of whom Jacob Collins is the father. Ricky struggles to accept this at first, but soon seems to realize that Jacob is similar to himself and gives Jacob his blessing to marry Trinity.

As in previous seasons, Ricky remains devoted to his family, including his new grandson, and to his pets despite his attempts to get them drunk and stoned. In the ninth episode of season 10, Ricky is shot by Pvt. Dancer, who struggled with Jim Lahey, after they agreed that they would kill someone to solve their problems. Alcohol was involved. The bullet struck his temporal lobe, sending him into a coma. During this coma, in episode 10, a very drunk Jim Lahey visited Ricky.

At this time, Lahey claimed that Ricky was his biological son, explaining that this caused Ricky's mother to leave Sunnyvale and Jim and Ray to hate each other. However, in Season Eleven, after Ricky discovers the "truth" of his heritage, it is revealed that Lahey is not his father, although Lahey himself firmly believed that he was. After doing research at the hospital, Bubbles and Julian discovered that neither Lahey nor Ray are Ricky's biological father.

Ricky has shown a high level of adroitness in regards to outsmarting law enforcement officers, even when seemingly caught red-handed during the commission of crimes.

A running gag in the series is Ricky wearing the same shirt for the entire duration of a season.

== Reception and legacy ==
College Humour described Ricky by saying: "... it's Ricky that keeps us coming back – the dumbest of the show's core trio, often the highest, sometimes the scummiest, but always uniquely himself. We love you, Ricky, you greasy bastard". Screen Rant described Ricky by saying: "The audience learns about the details of the crime later, and our knowledge of Ricky gets filled in the same way. We don't know much about him at first except what we hear about him from other people. Then we see the rumors come to life with hilarious and cringeworthy results. Even the most popular guy in the trailer park has his secrets."

In 2005, Robb Wells in character as Ricky, along with Mike Smith and John Paul Tremblay as Bubbles and Julian, threw out the first pitch at the home opener of the 2005 Toronto Blue Jays season at the Rogers Centre.

== See also ==
- List of Trailer Park Boys characters
