= Michael Jackson (actor) =

Canadian actor, grip and gaffer (born 1970)

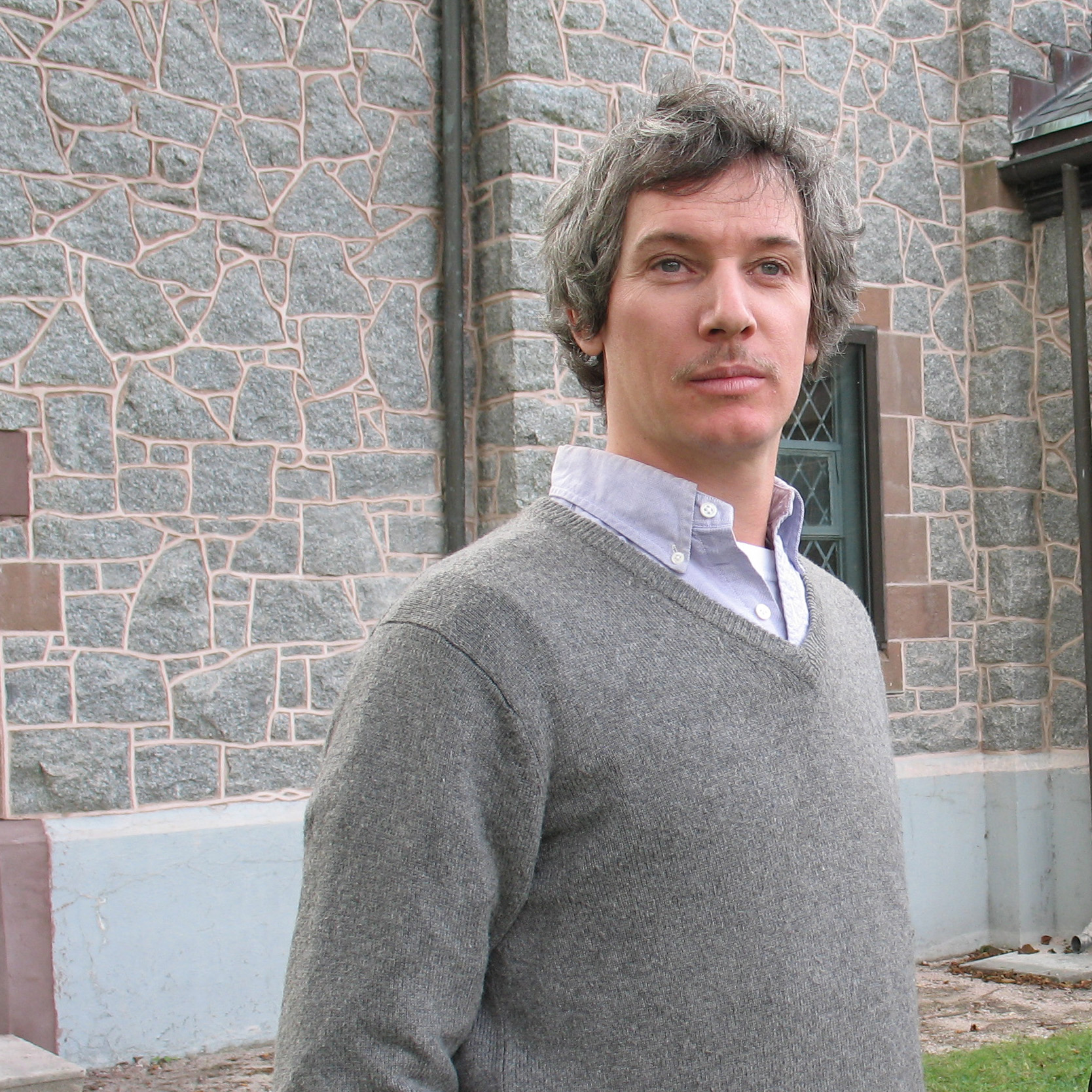
- Jackson in 2010
- Born: November 8, 1970 (age 55); Ottawa, Ontario, Canada
- Occupations: Actor, Grip, Gaffer

Michael Jackson (born November 8, 1970) is a Canadian actor, grip and gaffer. He is known for his acting role as "Trevor" in the comedy TV series Trailer Park Boys (2001–2018) and the later film Trailer Park Boys: The Movie (2006).

Jackson was born in Ottawa, Ontario.

He has contributed to the local music scene with many group and solo projects, including Moral Support, Aimless, Thruster, The Thursday Toads, Pink Kitten, Defense Andrew, The Sycamores, Rick of The Skins, El Groupo De Rock, Vavoom, T-Bag, The Olympian and most recently Doug Mason. He is also an IATSE 849 member and has been working as a grip since 1998.

In addition to his role as Trevor, Jackson was also a production assistant behind the scenes for seasons 2–6. During this time, Jackson and many of the other actors on the show were paid minimum scale (wage) despite the show's growing success. Tension grew between the producers (Barrie Dunn and Mike Volpe) and Jackson due to working conditions and creative disagreements. Jackson gave notice that he would leave the show after season 6, as he was close friends with the series' creator Mike Clattenburg. Although Jackson had one more season to fulfill on his contract, no legal action was taken against him.

The producers and writers did not directly address the issue of Cory and Trevor leaving the show at the end of season 6, even though they knew of Trevor's impending departure for some time beforehand. Their departure from Sunnyvale was addressed in season 7 and their names have been part of the continuing storyline. Cory Bowles returned for Season 8 as part of the show's Netflix reboot and has since appeared in each following season, with Jacob Rolfe's Jacob Collins character filling Jackson's role as Cory's sidekick, as Jackson declined to return to the show. In season eight, Cory explained that he and Trevor were exploring the world, but got separated on a subway train in New York City. In season 10, Bowles is credited as a director on some episodes.

== Filmography ==
Actor – Film titles and associated role:

- Eastern Shore (2007)
- Trailer Park Boys: The Movie (2006) .... Trevor

... a.k.a. Les trailer Park Boys – Le film (Canada: French title)
... a.k.a. Trailer Park Boys: Baked on a True Story (USA: promotional title)

- "Trailer Park Boys" .... Trevor (46 episodes, 2001–2018)
- The Trailer Park Boys Christmas Special (2004) (TV) .... Trevor
- Trailer Park Boys (1999) .... Trevor

Crewman – Film titles and associated crew job:

- Ice Castles (2009) (TV) (filming) (grip)
- Jesse Stone: No Remorse (2009) (TV) (post-production) (grip)
- Jesse Stone: Thin Ice (2009) (TV) (grip)
- The Tenth Circle (2008) (TV) (grip) (uncredited)
- The Memory Keeper's Daughter (2008) (TV) (grip)
- Wedding Wars (2006) (TV) (grip)
- Candles on Bay Street (2006) (TV) (grip)
- The Colonel Ignacio Santillan (2005) (V) (gaffer)
- The Dive from Clausen's Pier (2005) (TV) (grip)
- Sleep Murder (2004) (TV) (grip)
- She's Too Young (2004) (TV) (grip)
- Footsteps (2003) (TV) (grip)
- The Christmas Shoes (2002) (TV) (grip) (uncredited)

... a.k.a. Les souliers de Noël (Canada: French title)

- My Little Eye (2002) (best boy grip)
- Julie Walking Home (2002) (grip)

... a.k.a. The Healer (Australia: Pay-TV title) (USA: DVD title)
... a.k.a. Julia wraca do domu (Poland)
... a.k.a. Julies Reise (Germany)
... a.k.a. Le retour de Julie (Canada: French title)

- Too Young to Be a Dad (2002) (TV) (grip)

... a.k.a. A Family's Decision (USA)
... a.k.a. Too Young to Be a Father (USA)
... a.k.a. Trop jeune pour être père (Canada: French title)

- The Pilot's Wife (2002) (TV) (best boy grip)

... a.k.a. La femme du pilote (Canada: French title)

- "Trailer Park Boys" (2001) TV series (key grip) (unknown episodes)
- Blue Hill Avenue (2001) (best boy grip)
- Passion and Prejudice (2001) (TV) (grip)
- "Blackfly" (2001) TV series (grip) (unknown episodes)
- Parsley Days (2000) (best boy grip)
- The Weight of Water (2000) (grip)

... a.k.a. Le poids de l'eau (France)

- Rain (2000/I) (best boy grip)
- Trailer Park Boys (1999) (key grip)
