= Julian (Trailer Park Boys) =

Fictional character from the television series Trailer Park Boys

- Trailer Park Boys character
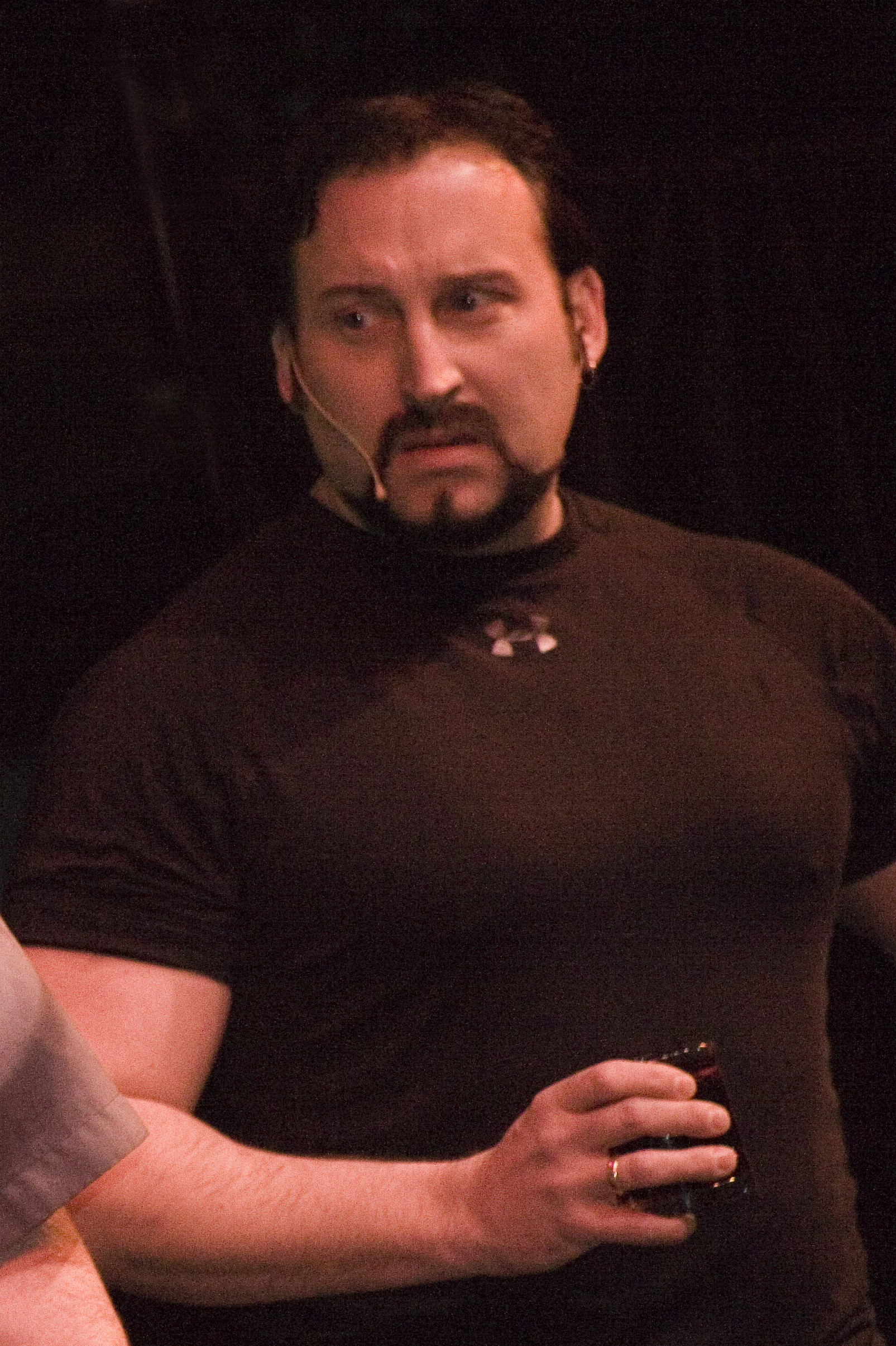
- First appearance: Trailer Park Boys (1999)
- Created by: Mike Clattenburg
- Portrayed by: John Paul Tremblay
- Voiced by: John Paul Tremblay (The Animated Series)

In-universe information
- Nicknames: Patrick Swayze and sometimes Sexian
- Occupation: Criminal; Businessman; Podcaster
- Home: Sunnyvale Trailer Park, Dartmouth, Halifax, Nova Scotia, Canada
- Nationality: Canadian

Julian "Jules" is a fictional character in the Canadian television series Trailer Park Boys. He is one of the three main protagonists on the show along with Ricky and Bubbles, portrayed by John Paul Tremblay, he was created by series creator Mike Clattenburg. Julian also appears in four films; one short, and three feature length. Before the show, he appeared in the short film Trailer Park Boys (1999). He appears in the feature-length films: Trailer Park Boys: The Movie (2006), Countdown to Liquor Day (2009), and Don't Legalize It (2014). Julian also appears in numerous spin-offs, including Out of the Park: Europe, Out of the Park: USA, and The Animated Series, in which the latter John Paul Tremblay voices him.

== Character biography ==
Julian is the eldest primary character in the series. He is responsible for hiring the camera crew that follows the characters around, originally meant to document his life. Like Ricky, Julian enjoys marijuana and alcoholic beverages, and he used to smoke cigarettes. In the original 1999 black-and-white movie Trailer Park Boys, Julian sold and used cocaine, and Ricky also indulged. Despite being a career criminal, Julian follows a clearly defined set of morals and often displays a level of honour and selflessness well beyond that of a normal criminal.

He claims to be very well-read and possesses a slightly higher than average vocabulary, which often confuses Ricky. Julian and Ricky have been best friends since childhood, although Julian is often appalled by Ricky's actions. Being smarter than Ricky, Julian often acts as a mentor of sorts for him, offering advice and working to keep his antics in check. Nevertheless, Julian would occasionally permit Ricky to wreak havoc on their adversaries if the situation demanded it. Julian's main goal in life, alongside Ricky, is to get rich quick and retire, and he spends most of the series pursuing this goal via a series of audacious crimes, such as bootlegging, dealing drugs, and stealing barbecues. Julian usually devises many of the schemes that the Boys engage in, and will subsequently take a leadership role. Julian is very clever and almost always finds a creative solution to the various problems the Boys encounter, though he lacks Ricky's talent for lying to the police.

Although he often appears intimidating to other characters, Julian is actually very compassionate to those he cares about and prefers to avoid confrontations, though he will not hesitate to fight back when things turn violent. As the series progresses, Julian's character becomes more manipulative in order to achieve his profitable schemes, sometimes resulting in his malicious behavior directly affecting Bubbles or Ricky and creating conflict.

Julian has a muscular build and always wears a tight black T-shirt, blue or black jeans, and motorcycle boots, along with greasy black hair, akin to a greaser. As a running joke, he almost always has a glass of rum and Coke in hand, regardless of the situation, including a scene in Season 2's seventh episode in which he emerges from a crashed – and rolled – vehicle with his drink still in hand, and in the film Trailer Park Boys: Countdown to Liquor Day, where he continues carrying it even when impersonating a security guard for an armoured car.

He is the only one of the Boys with a proper home, his late grandmother's trailer. Julian reputedly has a lifelong obsession with actor Patrick Swayze and due to an embarrassing childhood incident, he becomes greatly offended when referred to as Patrick Swayze.

== Reception and legacy ==
John Paul Tremblay has received positive reviews for his portrayal. Screen Rant described Julian by saying: "He's rough and tough and acts as protector of the trailer park where he lives. This is Julian, one of the main protagonists of Trailer Park Boys. The well-loved character is played by John Paul Tremblay, and he is best known for his close friendships with Bubbles and Ricky."

In 2005, John Paul Tremblay in character as Julian, along with Mike Smith and Robb Wells as Bubbles and Ricky, threw out the first pitch at the home opener of the 2005 Toronto Blue Jays season at the Rogers Centre.

== See also ==
- List of Trailer Park Boys characters
