= John Paul Tremblay =

Canadian actor, screenwriter, and comedian

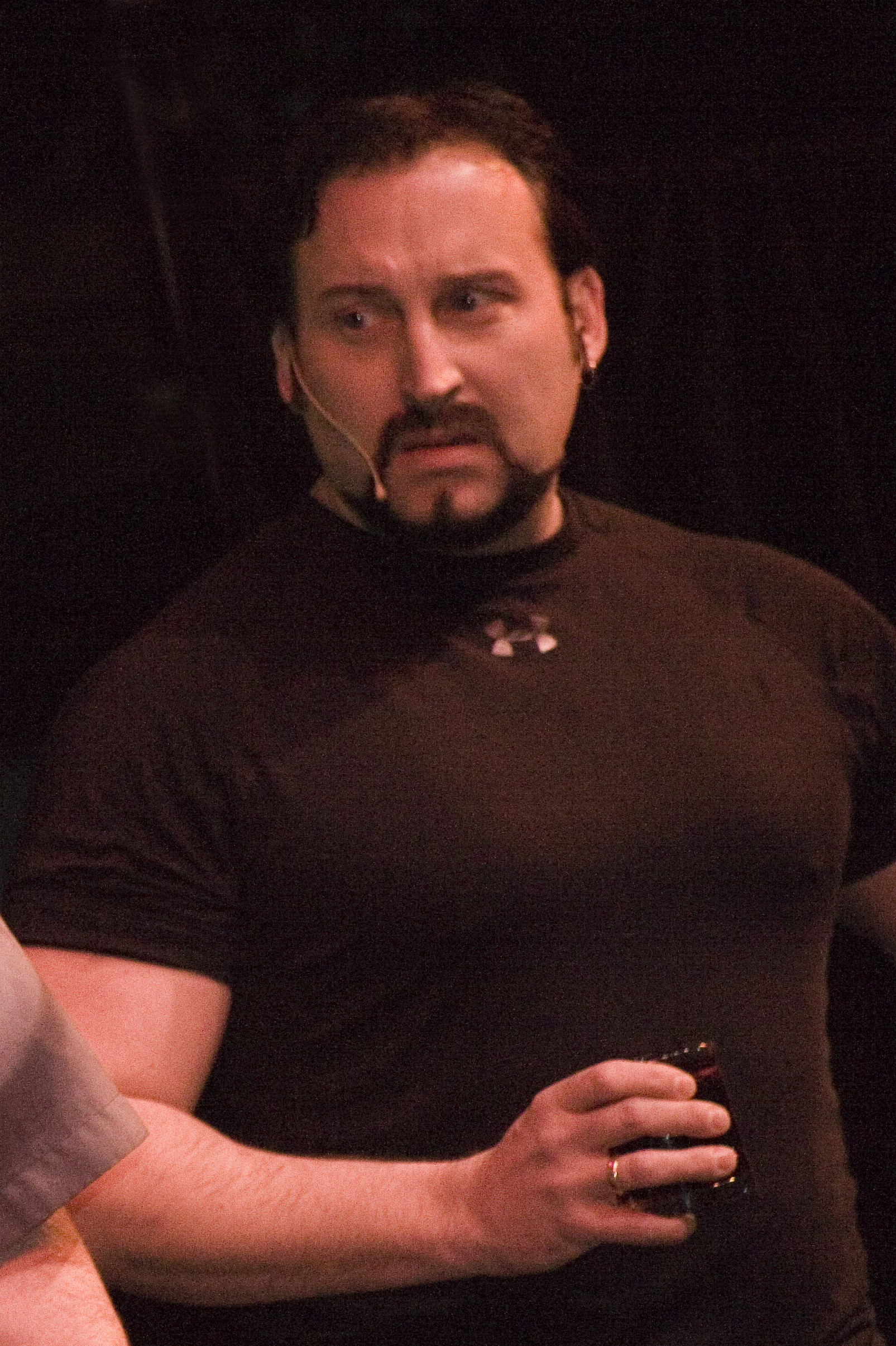
- Tremblay in character as Julian in April 2009
- Born: May 17, 1968 (age 57); Halifax, Nova Scotia, Canada
- Other names: JP Tremblay
- Occupations: Actor, screenwriter, comedian
- Years active: 1995–present
- Spouse: Andrea Hurley (m. 2002)
- Children: 3

John Paul Tremblay (born May 17, 1968) is a Canadian actor, screenwriter, and comedian who is best known for his role as Julian in the TV series Trailer Park Boys and subsequent media in the franchise.

== Career ==
Before acting in Trailer Park Boys, Tremblay and his future co-star Robb Wells owned a chain of pizza restaurants called J.R. Capone's. The two had known each other since their teenage years. Trailer Park Boys is written by Tremblay along with co-stars Robb Wells and Mike Smith.

Tremblay starred in the film adaptation of the series, which was released in 2006. The film was mostly filmed in the municipality of Halifax.

Tremblay and Wells also appeared in the 2002 family film Virginia's Run, though not as Ricky and Julian.

In 2010, Tremblay appeared with many of his former Trailer Park Boys castmates in the new series The Drunk and On Drugs Happy Fun Time Hour. In 2011, Tremblay again reunited with Trailer Park Boys castmates Robb Wells and Mike Smith for the live comedy show Drunk, High and Unemployed, which toured across the United States.

Tremblay reunited with the Trailer Park Boys for an eighth and ninth season of the show which premiered on Netflix from September 5, 2014. Writing for seasons 10 & 11 began in January 2015. Filming began for season 10 in June 2015. Season 10 of the show was released March 28, 2016, the eleventh on March 31, 2017, and the twelfth on March 30, 2018. This concluded with most of the main characters entering an animated reality after taking an overdose of hallucinogenic mushrooms, which led into Trailer Park Boys: The Animated Series released in 2019.

== Filmography ==
=== Films ===
Year	Title	Role	Notes
1995	The Cart Boy	Jason	Short film; also writer
1998	One Last Shot	Gary William (aka G.W)	Short film; also writer
1999	Trailer Park Boys	Julian	Also writer
2004	A Hole in One	Moe	
2006	Trailer Park Boys: The Movie	Julian	
2009	Trailer Park Boys: Countdown to Liquor Day	Julian	
2010	MashUpPiece Theater: The Wire/Trailer Park Boys	Julian	Short film
2011	Goon	Julian	Also credited as "Production Assistant #3"
2014	Swearnet Live	Himself / Julian	Also director, writer, producer and executive producer
2014	Swearnet: The Movie	Himself / Julian	Also director, writer, producer and executive producer
2014	Trailer Park Boys: Don't Legalize It	Julian	
2015	Being Canadian		Documentary
2024	Standing on the Shoulders of Kitties	Julian	Also producer

=== Television ===
Year	Title	Role	Notes
2001–present	Trailer Park Boys	Julian	Also writer (26 episodes); Also producer (20 episodes)
2004	Gracie's Choice	Roland	Television movie Uncredited
2004	Snakes & Ladders	Thug	Season 1, Episode 5
2004	The Trailer Park Boys Christmas Special	Julian	Television movie
2006	Hearts of Dartmouth: Life of a Trailer Park Girl	Julian	Documentary (Archive footage)
2006	East Coast Music Awards	Julian	Host
2011	The Drunk and On Drugs Happy Funtime Hour	Various	2 episodes; also writer and executive producer
2012	Archer	Mountie / Terrorist (voice)	Episode: "The Limited"
2014	Trailer Park Boys: Live in F**kin' Dublin	Julian	Television movie Also director, writer and producer
2014	Trailer Park Boys: Live at the North Pole	Julian	Television movie Also director, writer and producer
2015	Drunk, High and Unemployed (Live in Austin)	Julian	Television movie Also director, writer and producer
2016	Trailer Park Boys: Out of the Park: Europe	Julian	
2017	Trailer Park Boys: Out of the Park: USA	Julian	
2019–2020	Trailer Park Boys: The Animated Series	Julian (voice)	Also executive producer and writer
2021–present	Trailer Park Boys: Jail	Julian	Also executive producer and writer
