= Sarah Dunsworth-Nickerson =

Canadian actress and costume designer

- Born: Sarah Elizabeth Dunsworth; January 25, 1976 (age 50); Halifax, Nova Scotia, Canada
- Occupation: Actress
- Years active: 1997–present
- Spouse: Ben Nickerson (m. 2017)
- Family: John Dunsworth (father); Molly Dunsworth (sister)

Sarah Elizabeth Dunsworth-Nickerson (born January 25, 1976) is a Canadian actress who plays the character of Sarah in the Canadian television franchise Trailer Park Boys. She is the real-life daughter of the late John Dunsworth, the actor who played Jim Lahey. She additionally appeared in Beefcake and the shorts The Bridge and Treevenge.

Dunsworth-Nickerson is also a costume designer on Trailer Park Boys and projects such as Hobo with a Shotgun (in which her sister Molly Dunsworth co-stars with Rutger Hauer), and has worked in film and television in several other capacities, including production design, casting, and as an assistant director.
