= Barrie Dunn =

Canadian actor, producer and lawyer

- Born: June 5, 1952 (age 74)
- Education: Mount St. Vincent University; Dalhousie Law School
- Occupations: Actor, lawyer, film and television producer

Barrie Dunn (born 5 June 1952) is a Canadian actor, lawyer, film, and television producer best known for his character Ray LaFleur on the Canadian mockumentary television program Trailer Park Boys. Dunn has practiced at the law firm Pink Larkin.
