= Lou Jurgens =

British-born Canadian actor and producer

- Born: Epsom, England
- Education: York University
- Occupations: Actor; producer; casting director; model; photographer; multimedia artist
- Years active: 2009–present
- Parents: Paul Cloete Jurgens; Elizabeth Clare Jurgens
- Website: www.loujurgens.co.uk

Lou Jurgens (born Sarah Louise Jurgens), is a British-born Canadian actor, producer, casting director, model, photographer, and multimedia artist. Known mainly for their acting work in film and television, Jurgens is also the co-founder of The Blood Projects, a Canadian theatre company through which Jurgens and co-founder Sasha Singer-Wilson have produced a number of projects including Little Tongues, This Is It, and Inside.

== Early life and education ==
Lou Jurgens was born in Epsom, England to South African-British parents Elizabeth Clare Jurgens and Paul Cloete Jurgens. Jurgens went to the theatre for the first time at the age of five: "I was hooked on the power of theatre the day my dad took me to see Cats on Broadway in London." The family moved to Cape Town, South Africa, and later to Tumbler Ridge, a small coal-mining town in northern British Columbia when Lou was still a child, later relocating to the Lower Mainland, on the coast, where the young Jurgens discovered acting in high school, performing in musicals.

At age 18, Jurgens moved to Toronto to study at the Acting Conservatory at York University, graduating with a Bachelor of Fine Arts Honours. They chose acting as their "passion and profession": "It was the art form that I found most challenging and demanding in terms of self-exploration. As I grow as an individual, I also grow as an artist. It is an ever-evolving process and it's one that keeps me asking questions, and keeps me engaged with life." The most challenging aspect of their training as an actor was maintaining perspective: "Sometimes it's easy to forget what's going on in the rest of the world when ... submerged in such an intensive training", which they value very highly:

Four years seems like a lot for intensive acting training, but I wouldn't trade it for the world. Education is a powerful tool and my training is so rock solid; so ingrained in me now. One of my favourite things at York was our Clown Training. Clowning became an integral part of my process as an actor. It developed an entirely new level of vulnerability for me, it taught me the power of humor & tragedy and that they are often one entity. It taught me how to improv!

Under the guidance of Leah Cherniak, Jurgens formed one half of a clowning double act, "Rosie and Loulou"; the pair performed the act in Toronto on several occasions through at least 2011, eventually resulting in one of the earliest performances in a short film by Jurgens. The act was described by one critic as "character-driven, engaging on an emotional level, sometimes holding-a-mirror-up".

In their graduation year (2009), Jurgens co-founded The Blood Projects theatrical production company with their friend and fellow alumna Sasha Singer-Wilson after the unions affiliated with the university went on strike, which led to the cancelling of many classes and shows: "It completely altered our final year ... We really felt the loss of that creative time, so we decided we were going to create our own work."

After graduating, Jurgens spent time in London, England, doing theatre workshops before returning to Toronto, where they continued to study with David Rotenberg at the Professional Actors Lab and Michèle Lonsdale Smith.

== Career ==
=== Overview ===
Most of the work Lou Jurgens has done since graduation has been in film and television, including commercial work. In September 2015, asked how they decide on serious roles or projects, Jurgens said they choose roles based on challenge:

If any sort of fear bubbles up when I encounter the script, I know it's because the material is resonating with me, and whatever the character represents is a chance to explore that aspect of myself. I also get really inspired when the creative team is composed of artists who are equally passionate about telling the same story, and taking risks with it.

In December of the same year, Jurgens said: "I would like to play strong female characters with agency, who aren't minimized by patriarchal ideas but rather deeply human… I would like to work in film and theatre that isn't afraid to engage audience members and ask pressing questions about the nature of our humanity." Spending time in several different countries in their youth prompted a fascination with accents and dialects:

Because I grew up with the good fortune of traveling to different areas of the world where my extended family resides, I developed a keen ear for accents. I really enjoy dialect work, it often opens up an entirely new inner-landscape for me to draw on as an actor, and it brings an edge to the character that I otherwise may not have found.

Jurgens is able to "tap in" and become a wide range of characters with starkly different backgrounds. Director Jonathan Bensimon has called them "a gifted, versatile, and bold actress" and described their performances as "raw, honest and fearless". They have been able to transition between heavy drama, comedy and horror projects "with astonishing ease."

=== Motion pictures ===
==== Feature films ====
Michael DeCarlo's Two Hands to Mouth (2012) is a dark, comedic, politically-driven feature film where eight blindfolded guests assemble at a secret pop-up restaurant. The film was nominated for two awards at the 2013 Madrid International Film Festival. Jurgens played Anya, the Russian wife of a businessman named Frank (Joe Pingue): "Working with a Russian dialect opened up a very specific emotional range for me. It was incredibly fun to play a woman so secure in her sexuality and power." They went on to say it was an "invaluable learning experience" working with veterans like Kate Trotter, Ernie Grunwald, and Vincent Walsh.

Swearnet: The Movie (2014) is a comedy made by the team behind Trailer Park Boys, plus Tom Green, Carrot Top, and Lou Jurgens, who plays Julie, the girlfriend of Rob Wells, "driven mad by jealousy with an obsession over an ex-punk rock star". Jurgens credits their training in clowning at York University for getting them the part: "When I was going through the callback process for Swearnet, I found I relied deeply on the fundamentals of clowning and it allowed me to improv in the audition room effortlessly." Filming Swearnet was the most fun they had ever had on a set: Wells, Mike Smith, John Paul Tremblay and Tom Green were constantly improvising. "The director, Warren P. Sonoda, created a working environment that was fast-paced and creatively freeing. We were often encouraged to stretch the boundaries of the characters ... and the improv elements kept me on my toes."

In The Man in the Shadows (2015), Jurgens played Rachel, a photographer addicted to prescription drugs who starts to lose her sense of reality as she grapples with her broken marriage and her nightmares, which turn out to be real. Jurgens said it gave them "permission" to explore the experience of being haunted, hunted and stalked", an "opportunity to live in a state of mental unraveling": "I enjoyed the challenge of playing a character who was wrestling with truth and illusion, experiencing the slippage of her own sanity." Jurgens found the most challenging thing was "arcing" the character's descent into delusion. The film opened at the Dances with Films Festival in Los Angeles, then at Cinéfest Sudbury and Scare-A-Con where it was nominated for Best Feature and Best Actress.

Jurgens has a supporting role in Georgetown, a film by Christoph Waltz which premiered on 27 April 2019.

==== Short films ====
In 2010, Jurgens took their clowning double act and a camera crew to Toronto's Financial District. Rosie & Loulou: Quest for Love (2011) is a short docufiction film directed by Elli Weisbaum which follows the pair as they talk about love and offer roses to passersby.

In December 2015, Jurgens finished filming their scenes as the star of County Time, a short film directed by Jonathan Bensimon (who directed them in Let Go of the Future) and written by Josh Peace based on his experiences living in Huron County, Ontario, a small farming community filled with "larger than life characters" and tall tales. Jurgens "loved the erratic behaviour" of their character, who they described as "feisty, determined, easily irritated, and no-bullshit." The film had its premiere at Palm Springs International ShortFest, the largest film festival for short films in the US, on 23 June 2017.

Jurgens worked with Swansea-based Canadian director Teryl Brouillette on a pair of short narrative films, Work (2016), a docudrama, and A Bridge and a Door.

Jurgens was the casting director for Bite and Smile, a 2018 short satirical film by Elise Baumane.

=== Television and web series ===
Jurgens' first television role was Gaia, a guest part on Lost Girl in 2011, followed by another guest role as Karina Vost on Covert Affairs in 2012. In 2013, they appeared on Republic of Doyle and Beauty & the Beast. Around this time Jurgens also appeared in the web series Backpackers, later picked up as a television series by The CW in 2014.

In 2015, Jurgens had the starring role of Lucy Huff in the pilot for director Matthew Kowalchuk's comedy miniseries Green-ish, in which their character, a recent divorcee, forms an environmental activist group in an attempt to win the local mayoral race and remove their conservative ex-husband, the current mayor, from office. In 2017, Jurgens portrayed recurring character Shawna in the third season of iZombie.

=== Videos, modeling, and voice acting ===
In 2013, Jurgens starred in the Dove and Gun music video Let Go of the Future, which premiered at the Cannes Film Festival. The video showcased their ability "to communicate a character's story and exude deep, soulful emotion without ever having to say a word." In 2014, Jurgens was one of three people chosen as models accompanying photographer Scarlet O'Neill on a road trip from Toronto to Nashville, doing shoots along the way while filmmaker Ana Alic shot an artistic video of the women posing during the trip, Girls Gone Nashville. Jurgens is known to have appeared in five commercial videos and has done modelling work since at least 2010.

Jurgens provided one of the additional voices in the 2015 video game Assassin's Creed Syndicate.

=== Toronto stage ===
==== The Blood Projects ====
The Blood Projects differs from other companies in that the focus is on original works. The staging of these works also sets them apart, as the company specializes in immersive theatre, the audience members free to move from room to room, to choose where to view one of several simultaneously occurring scenes. Productions take place in site-specific areas, the company dedicated to creating immersive performances in "unlikely places" and "re-imagining more traditional spaces; uniting emerging and established artists and managing the company and production of our work with ecological awareness and integrity." The name of the company is derived from the founders' interest in "the connective tissue of stories"; they were interested in work "connected to family, to questions about life and death, and the intricacies of the human experience", and they liked the idea of "projects" because they were both multi-disciplinary artists.

The company produced Singer-Wilson's first full-length play, Little Tongues, in a 35-seat downtown Toronto loft: "When scenes happened in the kitchen ... the actors were really preparing food and the audience could smell the dinner being made. It engaged with the audience on an intimate, sensory level." Jurgens played Tessa, the jaded daughter of a broken family. The production received extraordinary reviews from several outlets including Mooney on Theatre and Now Toronto as a Critics' Pick at the 2012 Toronto Fringe Festival. The company also produced Singer-Wilson's Brief Sketches (2014). Jurgens acted in both this and Singer-Wilson's third play, This Is It, staged entirely in bed, in which Jurgens dazzled audiences in the leading role of Eve. Inside (2016), a co-production with Cat and the Queen as part of the SummerWorks Performance Festival, explored the public presentation and private experience of self, the crew staging three shows per night, only allowing five audience members inside for each show, audience members only given the location of the apartment where the performance was staged the evening before the show.

==== Other productions ====
Jurgens has starred in an impressive list of high-profile theatrical productions including The Bewitched, The Clown Show, The Penelopiad and Reasons to Be Pretty. Nigel Shawn Williams's production of Peter Barnes' The Bewitched, one of her favourites, is set in 17th century Spain before the War of Spanish Succession, a story of the last of the Habsburg dynasty, "a family of rulers so inbred that their diseases prevent them from producing an heir to the throne", in which she played Queen Anna: "It was an incredible experience playing a historical figure. Maria Anna of Neuburg was Queen of Spain from 1689 to 1700 as the second wife of King Charles II. It allowed me to explore her explosive anger, resulting in seizures and phantom pregnancies." A later favourite stage role was in a Nightwood Theatre Director's Summit Workshop, a short but "most profound" theatrical experience, in which a group of actresses were gathered together for a workshop where a team of female directors were guided by world-renowned director and playwright Yael Farber. They explored Margaret Atwood's play, The Penelopiad, Atwood's "daring response" to Homer's Odyssey: "It was empowering to work with an inspiring collective of female artists, because everyone in the room was willing to take risks under the leadership and artistic genius of Yael Farber. I would love to work with them again in the future."

=== Multimedia artist ===
On 8 December 2015, Jurgens launched This Body Project, a multimedia art event which took place at Artscape Youngplace described as seven years in the making. Jurgens sought to "discover and transform the relationship between self and body" through "photography, audio recordings and the written word," posing the question, "What is your relationship with your body?" and inviting the individual to become the author of their own story. Jurgens said they were interested in "art that holds space for truth through testimony and witness."

As a young person, navigating my way through my 20s left me asking questions that I was desperate to discuss in a communal context. Examining the relationship between body and self is a life-long journey that deserves its own sacred space.

== Filmography ==
=== Motion pictures ===
Feature films

- Two Hands to Mouth (2012) • Anya
- Swearnet: The Movie (2014) • Julie
- The Man in the Shadows (2015) • Rachel Darwin
- Georgetown (2019)

Short films

- Rosie & LouLou: Quest for Love (2011) • (clown persona "LouLou", uncredited)
- A Bridge and a Door (2015?)
- Work (2016) • The Actor
- County Time (2017) • Tammy
- Bite and Smile (2018) (casting director)
- Boundless (2020)

=== Television and web series ===
- Lost Girl: "Something Wicked This Fae Comes" (2011) • Gaia
- Covert Affairs: "Wishful Beginnings" (2012) • Karina Vost
- Beauty & the Beast: "Playing with Fire" (2013) • Blonde Woman
- Republic of Doyle: "From Dublin with Love" (2013) • Kara Fisher
- Backpackers (2014)
- Green-ish: "Burnaby Mountain" (2015) • Lucy Huff
- iZombie: "Conspiracy Weary", "Return of the Dead Guy", "Twenty-Sided, Die" (2017) • Shawna
- Cross: Recurring, season 2 • Nat Gancarz

=== Videos and voice acting ===
- Let Go of the Future (2013) • Woman
- Girls Gone Nashville (2014) • Herself (model)
- Assassin's Creed Syndicate (2015) • (video game; voice)
