= I Declare War =

I Declare War may refer to:

- I Declare War (band), an American deathcore band
  - I Declare War (album), a 2011 album by the band
- I Declare War (film), a 2012 Canadian action comedy-drama film
- "I Declare War", a song by Pacewon
- "I Declare War", a song by Nardo Wick from the Judas and the Black Messiah soundtrack
