= Man in the Shadow =

Man in the Shadow may refer to:

- The Man in the Shadow, a 1926 American silent film directed by David Hartford
- Man in the Shadow (1957 American film), a 1957 American crime film
- Man in the Shadow (1957 British film), a 1957 British crime film
- The Man in the Shadows, a 2015 Canadian supernatural horror film
- "The Man in the Shadows", an episode of Father Brown
