= Jason Lapeyre =

Canadian film director, producer and screenwriter

- Born: Victoria, British Columbia, Canada
- Occupations: Film director; screenwriter; Film producer
- Notable work: Cold Blooded; I Declare War

Jason Lapeyre is a Canadian film director, producer, and screenwriter. He is best known for his 2012 film I Declare War, which premiered at the Toronto International Film Festival and won the Audience Award at Fantastic Fest. I Declare War was released theatrically in the US by Drafthouse Films.

== Early life and career ==
Lapeyre grew up as an army brat on Canadian military bases all over the world. He attended film school at Queen's University.

Lapeyre's debut feature, Cold Blooded, premiered at the Fantasia Film Festival and won the award for Best Canadian Feature. Lead performer Zoie Palmer won Best Actress for the film at the Bare Bones Film Festival.

He also produced the 2016 feature film The Lockpicker, which won the John Dunning Discovery Award for Best First Feature Film at the 5th Canadian Screen Awards in 2017.

In 2019, Lapeyre directed the streaming series Warigami for CW Seed and CBC Gem. It premiered at Canneseries, where it was nominated for Best Short-Form Series.

== Filmography ==
- Faceless (2011)
- Cold Blooded (2011)
- The Captured Bird (2012) (as producer)
- I Declare War (2012)
- Cold Deck (2015) (as writer)
- The Lockpicker (2016) (as producer)
- Warigami (2019)
