= Jenny Raven =

Hong Kong-American actress

- Born: 2 November; Hong Kong
- Occupation: Actress
- Years active: 2003–present

Jenny Raven is a Hong Kong-born and raised actress and multiple Canadian Screen Award Nominee. She is known for her work on Kim's Convenience as Gwen, Irina Wong in the American film Flatliners and Sasha Dixon in the television series Designated Survivor. Another notable performance was as Jasmine in "Arkangel", a Series 4 episode of the British television series Black Mirror.

== Early life ==
Jenny Raven was born on 2 November in Hong Kong to her Chinese mother and British father. She moved to Toronto, Ontario, Canada after graduating from Island School in Hong Kong, and graduated from the University of Toronto with a Bachelor of Science in criminology and psychology.

== Career ==
In 2003, Raven made her screen debut in the Cantonese-language Hong Kong film Men Suddenly in Black. After moving to Toronto, Ontario, Canada and graduating, Raven landed a leading role as Margo Dubois in the Canadian children's comedy TV series Majority Rules! for 26 episodes from 2009 to 2011. Raven worked alongside Juno Temple and Rhys Ifans in the American independent comedy-drama film Len and Company, which had its North American premiere at the 2015 Toronto International Film Festival. Raven has made single-episode appearances in numerous TV shows such as Lost Girl (2010), The L.A. Complex (2012), Private Eyes (2016), Shadowhunters and Good Witch (2017).

In 2017, Raven appeared as Irina Wong in Flatliners, a remake of the 1990 film of the same name. The same year, she appeared as Jasmine in "Arkangel", an episode of Black Mirror. Raven played a recurring role as Sasha Dixon in 10 episodes of the television series Designated Survivor from 2017 to 2018.

In 2018, Raven played Veronica in 6 episodes of the comedy series Wholesome Foods I Love You... Is That OK?, which went on to win 'Best International Comedy' at the British Web Awards in 2020 and 'Best Ensemble' at the Seoul Web Fest in 2019.

In 2019, Raven starred as Caine in the post-apocalyptic horror film Riot Girls. In 2020, Raven landed a guest role in the award-winning comedy series Kim's Convenience as Gwen, potential love interest of Kimchee played by Andrew Phung.

In 2021, Raven played a leading role as Emily in the Adam Reider directed Canadian horror film Woodland Grey. In 2022, Raven played a leading role in the romcom television movie Love at Sky Gardens. Raven stars as a barista whose coffee-spilling mishaps start a romance.

== Filmography ==
=== Film ===
Year	Title	Role	Notes / Ref(s)
2003	Men Suddenly in Black	Young JoJo	
2009	Patient	Hostage	Short film
2009	Cigarettes Hurt Babies	Denise	Short film
2009	Puck Hogs	Babyface Waitress #1	
2011	Long Branch	Lynn	Short film
2013	Hardsell	Steffy	Short film
2013	Cold	Kate	Short film
2014	Sleepless	Marla	Short film
2015	Cold Deck	Nadine	
2015	Let's Rap	Sam	
2015	Len and Company	Kelly	
2017	Bree and Drew (Me & You)	Bree	Short film
2017	Flatliners	Irina Wong	
2017	Our Practice	Madison	Short film
2019	Lloyd loses everything	Issy	Short film
2019	Goliath	Tiffany	
2019	Riot Girls	Caine	
2020	Consent Agreement	Jess	Short film
2021	My Soul to Take	Quinn	Short film
2021	Woodland Grey	Emily	
2021	We're All in This Together	Alyssa	
2023	The Amityville Curse	Lucy Davis	

=== Television ===
Year	Title	Role	Notes / Ref(s)
2010	Lost Girl	Libra	Episode: "Oh Kappa, My Kappa"
2010	Rookie Blue	Female Party Goer 2	Episode: "In Blue"
2011	I Kill Monsters	Piper	Pilot episode
2011	Warehouse 13	Amy Gillan	Episode: "Insatiable"
2009–2011	Majority Rules!	Margo Dubois	26 episodes
2012	The L.A. Complex	Production Assistant	Episode: "It's All About Who You Know"
2013	Cracked	Mai Nguyen	Episode: "Fallen"
2014	The Listener	Raven Masters	Episode: "Amuse Bouche"
2015	V Morgan is Dead	Jenna	7 episodes
2016	Private Eyes	Kristy Greene-Garvey	Episode: "Family Jewels"
2016	The Girlfriend Experience	Erin's Assistant	4 episodes
2017	Black Mirror	Jasmine	Episode: "Arkangel"
2017–2018	Designated Survivor	Sasha	10 episodes
2017	Good Witch	Theresa	Episode: "Say It with Candy"
2017	Shadowhunters	Leigh	Episode: "Dust and Shadows"
2018	Tom Clancy's Jack Ryan	Dr. Yen	Episode: "French Connection"
2018	Wholesome Foods I Love You... Is That OK?	Veronica	6 episodes
2019–2021	Kim's Convenience	Gwen	8 episodes
2021	Hudson & Rex	Bonnie Squire	Episode: "The Secret Life of Levi"
2022	Ruby and the Well	Angela	Episode: "I Wish I Could Stop Pretending"
2022	Love at Sky Gardens	Dierdre	Up TV TV movie
2024	My Dead Mom	Layla	TV series
2024	A '90s Christmas	Nadine	TV film (Hallmark)
2025	Wayward	Carla (Abbie's mother)	S1.Episode 1: "Tall Pines"
2025	Brilliant Minds	Dr. Mia Clark	S2.Episode 5: "Once Upon a Time in America"
2026	Worried	Autumn	Main cast
2026	The Couple Across the Street	Main cast	TV film
2026	Memory of a Killer	Henderson	S1.E6 & 7 - "Uncle Jacob" + "Dr. Parks"
2026–present	Sheriff Country	Emmy Yorke	Recurring

=== Video games ===
Year	Title	Role	Notes / Ref(s)
2017	Tom Clancy's Rainbow Six Siege	Ying (Special Duties Unit Operator)	
2022	Tom Clancy's Rainbow Six Extraction	Ying (Special Duties Unit Operator)	

== Awards and nominations ==
Year	Award	Category	Work	Result	Ref(s)
2023	Canadian Screen Awards	Best Lead Performer, TV Movie	Love at Sky Gardens	Nominated	
2025	Canadian Screen Awards	Best Supporting Performance, Web Program or Series	My Dead Mom	Nominated	
