= Shannon Kook =

South African actor (born 1987)

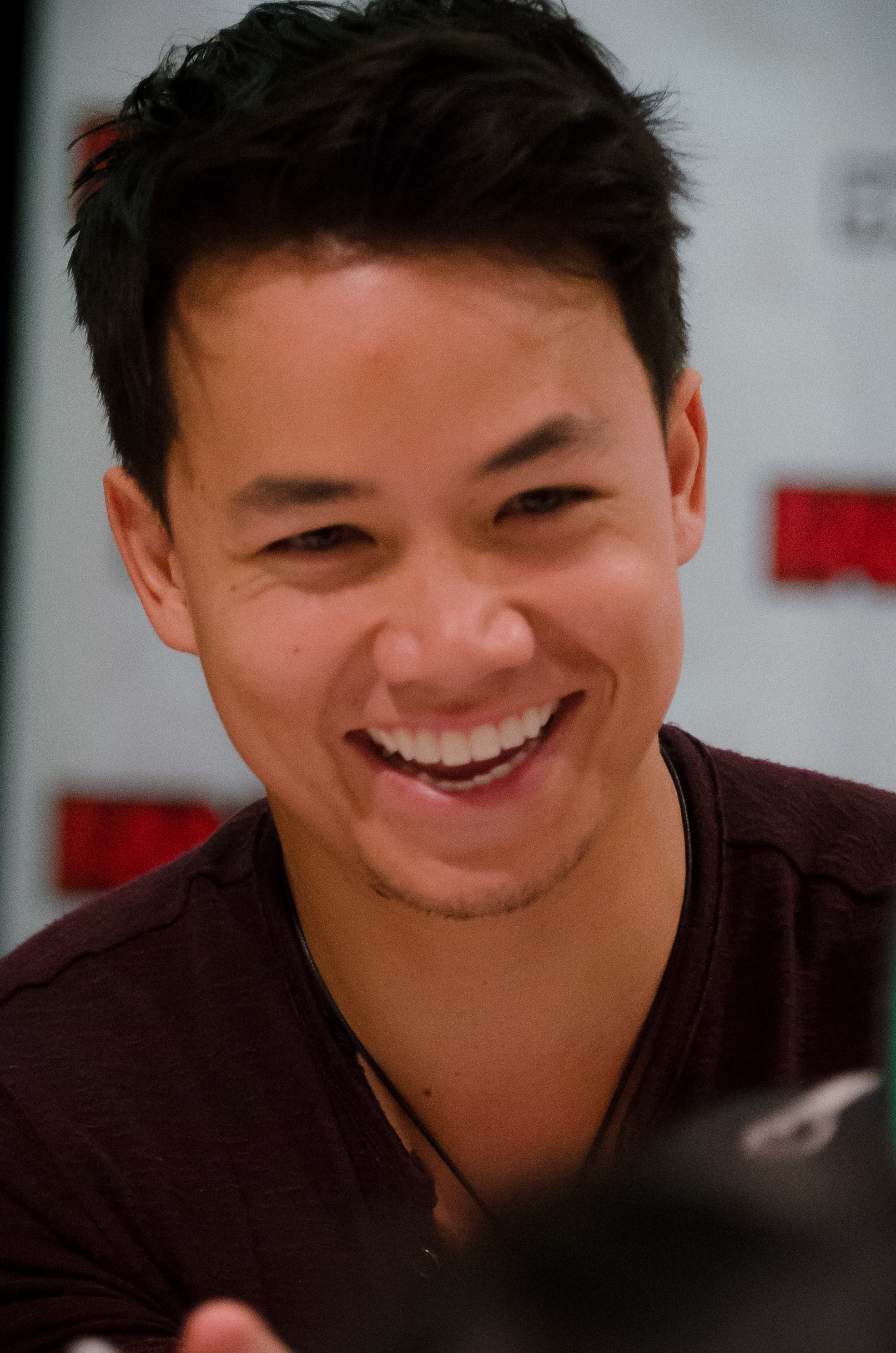
- Kook in 2016
- Born: Shannon Xiao Lóng Kook-Chun; 9 February 1987 (age 39); Johannesburg, South Africa
- Other name: Shannon Kook-Chun
- Citizenship: South African
- Education: National Theatre School of Canada
- Occupation: Actor
- Years active: 2009–present

Shannon Xiao Lóng Kook-Chun (born 9 February 1987) is a South African actor. He is known for his roles as Zane Park on the television series Degrassi: The Next Generation (2010–11), Jordan Green on The 100 (2018–20), and Tony Swan on Reacher (2023–present), as well as his role as Drew Thomas in the horror franchise The Conjuring Universe (2013–25).

== Early life ==
Kook was born in Johannesburg, South Africa to a Mauritian father of Chinese descent and a South African mother of Cape Coloured descent. He then moved to Montreal in order to attend the National Theatre School of Canada.

== Career ==
Kook's first on screen role was in the Canadian television series Being Erica in 2009. He gained widespread popularity for his role as Zane Park on Degrassi: The Next Generation in 2010.

In 2014, Kook, Alexandre Landry, Sophie Desmarais, and Julia Sarah Stone, were chosen for the Toronto International Film Festival's Rising Stars initiative, an annual distinction that spotlights four up and coming Canadian actors to talent developers and filmmakers at the festival.

Between 2015 and 2016, Kook starred in the popular web series Carmilla. In 2017, he was featured in the web series Running With Violet. That same year, he appeared in the Shadowhunters series as Duncan.

In January 2018, it was announced that Kook has been cast as a mysterious new guest star, Lucas, on the fifth season of The CW's The 100. This was revealed to be a red herring by series showrunner Jason Rothenberg. Kook's role was later revealed as Jordan Jasper Green, the son of Monty Green and Harper McIntyre. Kook had originally auditioned for the role of Finn Collins and Monty Green. Kook returned as a series regular in season six and seven.

In 2023, Kook was cast as Tony Swan in season two of Amazon Prime's action crime series Reacher.

== Personal life ==
Kook resides in Vancouver, British Columbia, Canada.

== Filmography ==
=== Film ===
| Year | Title | Role | Notes |
|---|---|---|---|
| 2010 | Verona | Xan | |
| 2012 | Requiem for Romance | Yun (voice) | |
| 2012 | Hunting Season | Jason | |
| 2013 | The Conjuring | Drew Thomas | |
| 2013 | Empire of Dirt | Angel | |
| 2013 | Hunting Season | Jason | |
| 2014 | The Dependables | Vic Skinner | |
| 2014 | Dirty Singles | Ian | |
| 2015 | Dark Places | Young Trey Teepano | |
| 2015 | A Christmas Horror Story | Dylan | |
| 2016 | The Conjuring 2 | Drew Thomas | |
| 2017 | Man Eater | Spencer | |
| 2017 | Sorry for Your Loss | Tyler | Short film |
| 2019 | Goliath | Dylan | Also producer |
| 2021 | The Conjuring: The Devil Made Me Do It | Drew Thomas | |
| 2023 | King of Killers | Ren Hiro | |
| 2025 | The Conjuring: Last Rites | Drew Thomas | |

=== Television ===
| Year | Title | Role | Notes |
|---|---|---|---|
| 2009 | Being Erica | Kendrick Kwan | Episode: "Cultural Revolution" |
| 2009 | The Border | Yuan Doa | Episode: "Kiss and Cry" |
| 2009 | Cra$h & Burn | Benny | Episode: "The Boss is Coming" |
| 2010 | Durham County | David Cho | 5 episodes |
| 2010 | Aaron Stone | Grudge | 2 episodes |
| 2010–11 | Degrassi: The Next Generation | Zane Park | Main role |
| 2010–11 | Baxter | Deven Phillips | 10 episodes |
| 2011 | Rookie Blue | Pete Sun | Episode: "God's Good Grace" |
| 2012 | XIII: The Series | Victor Gong | 2 episodes |
| 2013 | Holidaze | Karl Johnson | Television film |
| 2015–16 | Carmilla | Theo Straka | 6 episodes |
| 2016 | Private Eyes | Jay Lee | Episode: "Karaoke Confidential" |
| 2016 | 19-2 | Khoa | Episode: "Bitch" |
| 2016 | Beauty and the Beast | Jamal | Episode: "Something's Gotta Give" |
| 2017 | Incorporated | Commander Tobias | 2 episodes |
| 2017 | Thornwood Heights | Jamie Chen | Episode: "Deadly Secrets by the Lake" |
| 2017 | Running With Violet | Stewart | 5 episodes |
| 2017 | Shadowhunters | Duncan | 3 episodes |
| 2018–20 | The 100 | Jordan Green | (guest season 5; main cast season 6–7) 19 episodes |
| 2019 | Impulse | Wesley Kido | 2 episodes |
| 2020 | Woke | Ziggy | 2 episodes |
| 2020 | Rising Suns | Jr Officer Chen | 3 episodes |
| 2021 | Nancy Drew | Grant | 5 episodes |
| 2021 | The Mysterious Benedict Society | Mr. Oshiro | 3 episodes |
| 2022 | A Big Fat Family Christmas | Henry | Television film |
| 2023–2024 | Reacher | Tony Swan | |
| 2026 | Phony | Paul | |

== Awards and nominations ==
| Award | Year | Category | Nominated work | Result | Notes | Ref. |
|---|---|---|---|---|---|---|
| Canada Shorts Film Festival | 2018 | Merit Award | Sorry for Your Loss | Won | | |
| Forest City Film Festival | 2019 | Best Feature Film | Goliath | Nominated | Shared with Luke Villemaire, Nathan Dharamshi, and Madelyn Pilon | |
| Toronto International Film and Video Awards | 2014 | TIFF Rising Stars | —N/a | Won | | |
