= Two Hands to Mouth =

- Theatrical poster
- Directed by: Michael DeCarlo
- Written by: Michael DeCarlo
- Produced by: Mihkel Harilaid, Brigette Kingsley; Mihkel Harilaid, Michael DeCarlo (executive producers)
- Starring: Richard Zeppieri; Vincent Walsh; Art Hindle; Rachel Skarsten; Kate Trotter; Sebastien Roberts; Joe Pingue; Miranda Calderon; Conrad Coates; Joris Jarsky; Sarah Jurgens; Robyn Thaler Hickey; Warren Belle
- Cinematography: Steve Cosens
- Edited by: Andrew Kowalchuk
- Music by: Dave Hodge
- Production company: Black Walk
- Distributed by: Decade Distribution
- Release date: 1 October 2012
- Country: Canada
- Language: English
- Budget: C$700,000 (estimated)

Two Hands to Mouth is a 2012 Canadian dark comedy drama film with an ensemble cast, the first feature film by long time television film director Michael DeCarlo, who also wrote and co-executive produced the film, in which eight blindfolded guests assemble at a secret pop-up restaurant for an exclusive dinner that goes terribly awry, "forcing guests to defend themselves and their morally bankrupt lives." The film was nominated for two awards at the 2013 Madrid International Film Festival.

== Synopsis ==
Eight blindfolded guests assemble at a secret pop-up restaurant. Chef Michael Bradori is back, sober and ready to reclaim his former glory. Food, wine, greed and lust fuel the appetites in the room. Things take a shocking turn when the dining room is transformed into a minefield of political and personal danger where the characters come under threats of guns and violence.

== Cast ==
- Richard Zeppieri as Michael Bradori
- Vincent Walsh as Callum
- Art Hindle as Ron Baxter
- Rachel Skarsten as Leah Whitefield
- Ernie Grunwald as Noah
- Kate Trotter as Suzanne Baxter
- Sebastien Roberts as Derek Whitefield
- Joe Pingue as Frank
- Miranda Calderon as Jenny
- Conrad Coates as Ibraahim
- Joris Jarsky as Andrew
- Sarah Jurgens as Anya
- Robyn Thaler Hickey as Karen
- Warren Belle as Chop Chop

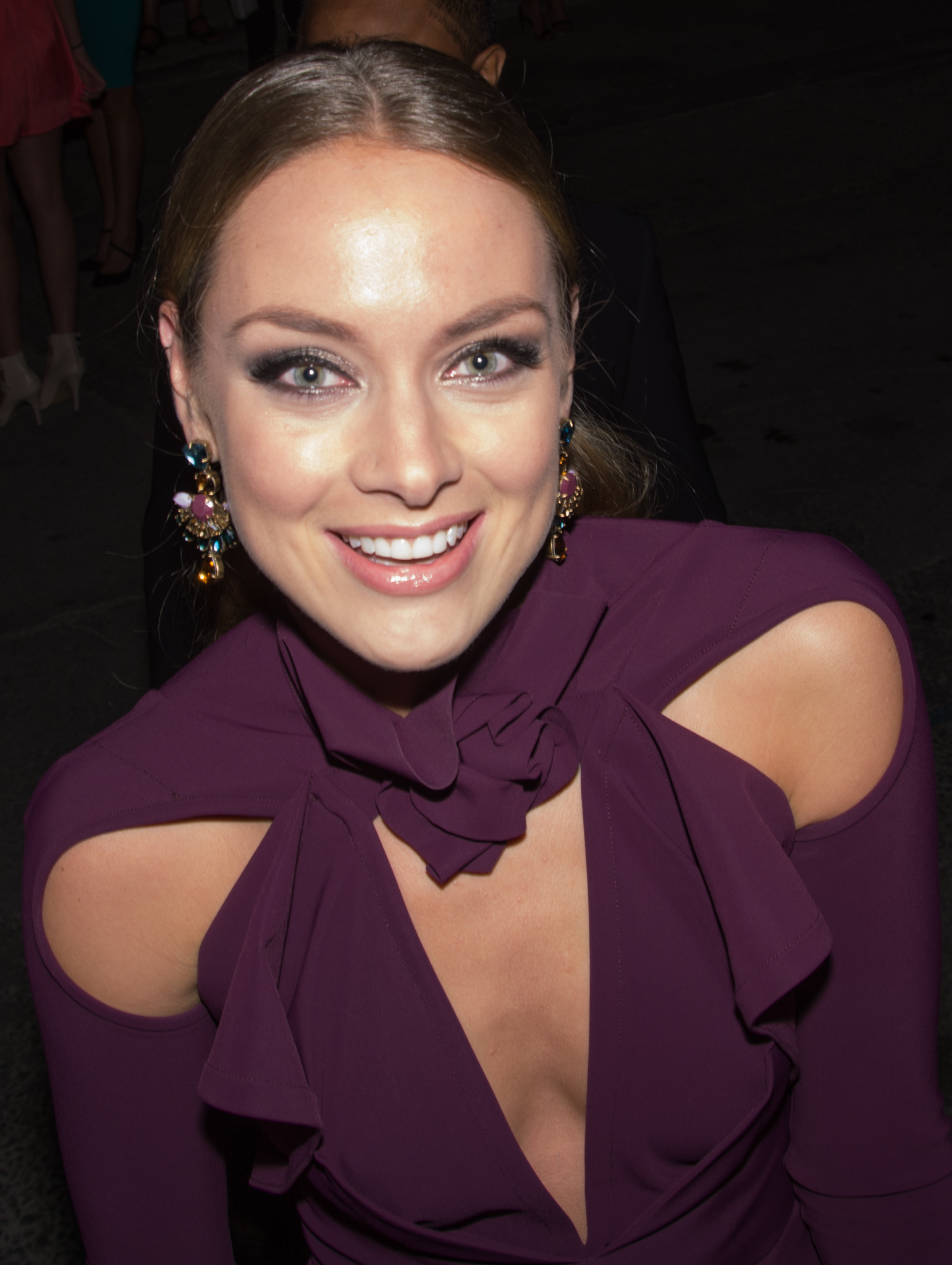
Rachel Skarsten at the 2014 Toronto International Film Festival

== Themes and influences ==
Two Hands to Mouth is a violent film, but it is "also about where violence comes from". Michael DeCarlo asserts that the violence in the film, both physical and emotional, is informed by character: "I tried to create an emotional and physical world that explores intimate and tender moments as well as violence and cruelty." The story is also politically-driven. The previous years' economic chaos informed the script: "At the same time, this is a narrative and dramatic film, not a political soap box."

In terms of aesthetics, DeCarlo kept in mind the words "lurid" and "elegant" in mind in preparation for Two Hands to Mouth: for visual inspiration, he and cinematographer Steve Cosens drew on the paintings of Francis Bacon, DeCarlo also citing Sidney Lumet, Luis Buñuel, Sam Peckinpah and Quentin Tarantino as cinematic inspirations: "I was aware of the cinematic tradition of violence".

== Production ==
=== Background and financing ===
Brigette Kingsley had been President of Black Walk Productions since 2008, and became head of Decade Distribution in 2011. Two Hands to Mouth was her first Telefilm Canada-supported feature film. The funding was from production through to post.

=== Writing and casting ===
The dialogue in Two Hands to Mouth is highly stylized; "wall-to-wall talking", and yet, "the characters rarely sound like they're speaking in the same voice, genuinely coming across as "many voices and personalities [who] co-exist and interact with each other".

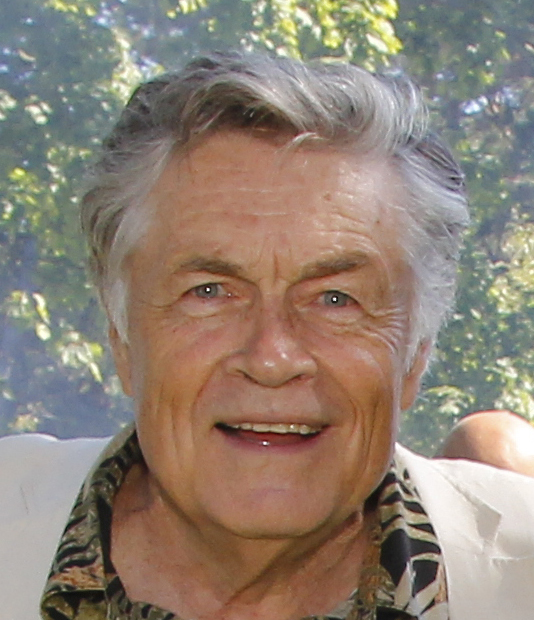
Art Hindle in 2014

Sarah Jurgens was enthusiastic about playing Anya, "a woman so secure in her sexuality and power", as well as working with a Russian accent. During Rachel Skarsten's audition for the part of Leah, she was impressed by DeCarlo's passion:

As I was auditioning, Michael stopped me and then stepped in to take over from the reader to run through the lines with me himself ... He pushed me to go much further in my interpretation, and I thought to myself, "This is someone I really want to work with." Thankfully, he felt the same way.

According to DeCarlo, Art Hindle had some real insight into his character because of "a previous life in the world of business": "He's an excellent actor. He's handsome and charming and has the intensity to reveal the darkness that lurks within that character."

=== Filming and editing ===
Principal photography took place in Hamilton, Ontario, over fifteen days with a single camera on a crowded set:

On some days there were 14 actors in the room ... It is very unusual to see a film with that many principals and more unusual to see them in a film of our scope. This is an intense and demanding film for the cast. We shot a lot of 15- and 20-minute takes and then we would do it again. And then again. This is the most shooting I have ever done in one day.

The experience of making the movie was accordingly challenging but rewarding, according to Skarsten. The small ensemble cast spent the entire shoot together, filming the majority of their scenes in one room and staying on the same floor of a hotel: "It was a very intense month, but I came away from it with some dear friendships ... and I would love to do more films like Two Hands to Mouth because it was so artistically thirst-quenching." Jurgens also found it to be an invaluable learning experience, working with veterans like Kate Trotter, Ernie Grunwald, and Vincent Walsh.

The film was edited by Andrew Kowalchuk, for which he was nominated for an award at the Madrid International Film Festival.

=== Music ===
Dave Hodge composed an original score for Two Hands to Mouth, pleased enough with the results that he hoped to create a new musical project based on a few of the pieces. In early 2013, in the aftermath of Hurricane Sandy, he ran into Leah Siegel and asked if she was interested in collaborating on the project, and after a few months of writing, recording, and mixing, Hodge and Siegel decided to form the band Leisure Cruise, resulting in the release of their self-titled debut album in May 2014, an album which incorporated two tracks from Two Hands to Mouth.

== Release and reception ==
Two Hands to Mouth was released on 1 October 2012.

=== Critical response ===
Adam Nayman describes the film's singular setting as "a sort of bare existential space", a "Sartrean" dinner party, and "easily one of the most distinctive-looking Canadian first features in recent memory", with "strong, dynamic compositions and boldly colour-coded lighting to bolster the underlying (and at times overwhelming) sense of claustrophobia and mania." The ensemble cast is "a vivid gallery of faces familiar from Canadian film and television", but for Nayman, the "star turn", belongs to "that old pro Art Hindle, who slips into the skin of a well-moneyed creep with serpentine finesse."

Two Hands to Mouth received two stars on Cinéséries.

=== Nominations ===
- Madrid International Film Festival • Best Editing • Best Actor (Art Hindle) (2013)
