= The Lockpicker =

- Directed by: Randall Okita
- Written by: Randall Okita
- Produced by: Chris Agoston; Robert Fisher; Jason Lapeyre; Randall Okita; Tania Thompson; Darcy Van Poelgeest
- Starring: Keigian Umi Tang; Linnea Currie-Roberts; Jordan Gray; Storie Serres
- Cinematography: Jackson Parrell
- Edited by: Jonathan Eagan; Mike Reisacher
- Music by: Joseph Murray; Menalon Music; Lodewijk Vos
- Release date: 11 October 2016 (Tacoma Film Festival)
- Running time: 105 minutes
- Country: Canada
- Language: English

The Lockpicker is a 2016 Canadian drama film, directed by Randall Okita. The film stars Keigian Umi Tang as Hashi, a troubled teen/petty criminal trying to escape a cycle of violence.

The film won the John Dunning Discovery Award at the 5th Canadian Screen Awards in 2017.
