= Ernie Grunwald =

Canadian actor (born 1970)

- Born: 1970 (age 55–56); Thornhill, Ontario, Canada
- Occupation: Actor
- Years active: 1994–present

Ernie Grunwald (born 1970) is a Canadian actor who has made guest appearances in a number of notable television series.

== Career ==
Grunwald has had recurring roles on One on One, The Suite Life of Zack & Cody (as Mr. Forgess), and Two of a Kind opposite Mary-Kate and Ashley Olsen. He has also guest starred on Friends, My Name Is Earl, NYPD Blue, Reno 911!, A.N.T. Farm, Walker, Texas Ranger, Supernatural, Grey's Anatomy, Two and a Half Men, Bones, The Mentalist, Weeds, and many other series. Grunwald guest starred as a restaurant manager in Monk ("Mr. Monk's 100th Case") and as a courier that lost a cooler containing a deadly virus in Psych ("Death is in the Air"). He also appeared as Walter in the Disney Channel Original Movie Good Luck Charlie, It's Christmas! in 2011.

Grunwald also made a cameo appearance in the 1992 Disney film The Mighty Ducks as a fan. He has also had roles in the feature films Cellular, It Takes Two, Men in Black II, and Stealing Harvard. Grunwald starred with Jason Priestley in Call Me Fitz.

== Filmography ==
=== Film ===
Year	Title	Role	Notes
1995	Jungleground	V.P	
1995	It Takes Two	Harry Butkis	
1999	Dudley Do-Right	Customs Officer	
2001	The Gristle	Jukebox Guy	
2002	Men in Black II	Young Postal Employee	
2002	Stealing Harvard	Lineup Man	
2004	Cellular	Busy Salesman	
2006	Comeback Season	Desk Clerk	
2007	Moola	Wild Bill	
2008	Get Smart's Bruce and Lloyd: Out of Control	Laboratory Worker #2	Direct-to-video
2009	The Lodger	Gregor	
2012	Two Hands to Mouth	Noah	

=== Television ===
Year	Title	Role	Notes
1994	Due South	Morgue Attendant	Episode: "Manhunt"
1994–1996	TekWar	Spaz	4 episodes
1995	Side Effects	Robert Dilworth	2 episodes
1996	Radiant City	Harvey	Television film
1996	The High Life	Claude	8 episodes
1997	Once a Thief	Thermo Rakis	Episode: "The Big Bang Theory"
1998–1999	Two of a Kind	Paul	11 episodes
1999–2001	It's Like, You Know...	Ernie / Waiter	8 episodes
2000	Veronica's Closet	The Pizza Guy	Episode: "Veronica's Girls' Night Out"
2001	That's Life	Plaintiff	Episode: "No Good Deed"
2001	Walker, Texas Ranger	Morris Dobbs	Episode: "Medieval Crimes"
2001	Inside Schwartz	Vigil Guy	Episode: "Bless Me Father, for I Have Fired You"
2002	Boomtown	Charlie Graham	Episode: "The Freak"
2003	Friends	Tom Gordon	Episode: "The One with the Memorial Service"
2003–2009	King of the Hill	Various roles	4 episodes
2004	The Stones	Spa Guy	Episode: "The Lawyer Trap"
2005	NYPD Blue	Jonas Grissom	Episode: "Sergeant Sipowicz' Lonely Hearts Club Band"
2005	Invasion Iowa	Steve Cook	Episode: "It Came from Hollywood"
2005	Reno 911!	Prospective Buyer	2 episodes
2005–2006	One on One	Benjamin	7 episodes
2005–2007	The Suite Life of Zack & Cody	Mr. Forgess	3 episodes
2007	My Name Is Earl	Pierre	Episode: "Foreign Exchange Student"
2007	Two and a Half Men	Clinician	Episode: "Putting Swim Fins on a Cat"
2007	Bones	Santa Fred Spivak	Episode: "The Santa in the Slush"
2008	Carpoolers	Loan Officer	Episode: "Lost in America"
2008	Eli Stone	Daryl Rhodes	Episode: "Patience"
2008	Just Jordan	Store Employee	Episode: "Anniversary-What?"
2008	Monk	Vampire Manager	Episode: "Mr. Monk's 100th Case"
2008	The New Adventures of Old Christine	Salesman	Episode: "How I Hate Your Mother"
2008	Hannah Montana	Ed	Episode: "Ready, Set, Don't Drive"
2009	Grey's Anatomy	Gary Rubin	Episode: "Sympathy for the Devil"
2009	Better Off Ted	Clark	Episode: "Get Happy"
2009	The Mentalist	Milton Howard	Episode: "Red Badge"
2009	Supernatural	Barnes / 'Sam'	Episode: "The Real Ghostbusters"
2010	Psych	Donny Leberman	Episode: "Death Is in the Air"
2010	CSI: Crime Scene Investigation	Lester Martin	Episode: "The Panty Sniffer"
2010	Weeds	Penguin	Episode: "To Moscow, and Quickly"
2010–2013	Call Me Fitz	Larry	48 episodes
2011	A.N.T. Farm	Zanko	Episode: "FraudulANT"
2011	Good Luck Charlie, It's Christmas!	Walter	Television film
2011	E! Special: Selena Gomez	Mr. Forgess	Television film
2013	2 Broke Girls	Leon	Episode: "And the Temporary Distraction"
2016	History of the World... for Now	Timeline / Analogy Guy	4 episodes
2019	Wayne	Vice Principal	Episode: "Chapter Six: Who Even Are We Now?"
2022–2023	Raven's Home	Lazlo	11 episodes
