= Swearnet: The Movie =

2014 Canadian comedy film

- Theatrical release poster
- Directed by: Warren P. Sonoda
- Written by: John Paul Tremblay; Robb Wells; Mike Smith
- Produced by: Gary Howsam; Bill Marks
- Starring: Mike Smith; John Paul Tremblay; Robb Wells; Pat Roach; Mishael Morgan; Sarah Jurgens; Shannon Leroux; Dana Woods; Howard Jerome; Tom Green; Carrot Top
- Cinematography: Bobby Shore
- Edited by: Christopher Cooper
- Music by: Blain Morris
- Production companies: Swearnet Pictures; Rollercoaster Entertainment; Vortex Words
- Distributed by: Entertainment One
- Release date: August 29, 2014
- Running time: 112 minutes
- Country: Canada
- Language: English

Swearnet: The Movie is a 2014 Canadian black comedy film directed by Warren P. Sonoda, and starring Mike Smith, John Paul Tremblay, and Robb Wells. It follows the trio of actors for the television series Trailer Park Boys, running their uncensored Internet network. The Guinness World Records website listed the film with the record for most uses of the word "fuck" up to 935 times. The film received the NC-17 rating from the Motion Picture Association of America. It was rated 18 by the British Board of Film Classification.

Swearnet: The Movie was released by Entertainment One on August 29, 2014 to negative reviews from critics.

== Plot ==
Fed up with being censored in their post–Trailer Park Boys lives, the out of work stars/world-renowned "Swearnet", Mike Smith, Robb Wells, and John Paul Tremblay decide to start their own uncensored network on the Internet.

== Cast ==
- Mike Smith as himself
- John Paul Tremblay as himself
- Robb Wells as himself
- Pat Roach as himself/Swearman
- Mishael Morgan as Jamie
- Sarah Jurgens as Julie
- Shannon Leroux as Rachel
- Dana Woods as Logi
- Howard Jerome as Trigger
- Tom Green as himself
- Carrot Top as himself
- Leigh MacInnis as Leigh
- Sebastian Bach as himself
- John Dunsworth as himself

Wells, Tremblay, and Smith reprised their roles in the mid-credits scene.

== Production ==
The film was shot between August 20 and September 12, 2012 in Sault Ste. Marie, Ontario and Halifax, Nova Scotia, using the Arri Alexa digital camera.

== Reception ==
The film received generally negative reviews from critics. On Rotten Tomatoes, it has an approval rating of 20% based on 10 reviews, with an average critical rating of 4.6/10. Metacritic, which uses a weighted average, assigned the film a score of 18 out of 100, based on 5 critics, indicating "overwhelming dislike".

== See also ==
- List of films that most frequently use the word fuck
- List of NC-17 rated films
