= Celest Chong =

Singaporean actress and singer

- Born: Singapore
- Education: Ang Mo Kio Secondary School; Yishun Junior College; National University of Singapore
- Occupations: Actress; singer; model
- Years active: 2000–present
- Spouse: Unknown (m. 2012; div. 2021)
- Musical career
- Genre: Pop
- Instrument: Vocals
- Website: www.celestmusic.com

Birth name
- Traditional Chinese: 張玉華
- Simplified Chinese: 张玉华
- Hanyu Pinyin: Zhāng Yùhuá

Former stage name
- Traditional Chinese: 斯畾
- Simplified Chinese: 斯畾
- Hanyu Pinyin: Sī Léi

Celest Chong is a Singaporean actress, singer and former cover model.

== Education ==
Chong studied at Yishun Junior College.

== Career ==
Chong began her acting career as a secretary in Eric Khoo's Stories about Love performing a Turkish inspired belly-dance. She also sang the show's theme song, "Sorry, My Love". Later, she moved on to Mediacorp Channel 5's sitcom, Making Love, in which she played a sultry receptionist named Pamela. She later played the character of a child social worker in the Channel 8 television drama, You Light Up My Life. She sang the theme songs for the new show, which were on Singapore's top music charts for four weeks.

In 2001, Chong left MediaCorp joined SPH MediaWorks on a two years contract. Chong also signed with Universal Music and launched a solo album Belong to Myself. In December 2002, her second album Celest, was released in Singapore, Taiwan, China, Hong Kong and Malaysia.

In 2004, after the merger between MediaCorp and SPH MediaWorks, Chong rejoined Mediacorp. However, she left Mediacorp after three months for Taiwan to work in the Taiwanese entertainment industry where she released her third album, Snowflakes in 2004. While in Taiwan, she also acted as a reporter in C'est La Vie, starring the Taiwanese actor Lin Yowei. She recorded her fourth album, Little Happiness, in 2006.

In 2007, Chong moved to Guiyang in China to film Acalea Blossoms. Two years later, she again moved back Singapore because of a family emergency.

In 2021, Chong acted as Parmoona Cash in the short film Moore’s Void. Her role won her the Best Actress at the inaugural Great Canadian Sci-Fi Film Festival in the same year.

Chong has appeared on dozens of magazine covers including Her World, Vogue, Elle, Citta Bella and FHM. She has modelled around the world for various print advertisements. She was voted one of the Top 100 most beautiful women in the world by FHM and The Sexiest Woman in Singapore by International Media with her five Ss - Sunshine Sweet, Smile, Sexy & Song. She was also voted No.1 in the Singapore Most Sexy Women's Survey on Citta Bella.

== Personal life ==
Chong initially moved to Canada in 2012 with her unknown Canadian husband. They had since divorced in 2021.

In an interview with Shin Min Daily News on 23 April 2023, Chong revealed that she had been making plans to permanently move back to Singapore in mid-2023, to take care of her elderly relatives. Chong also announced that she would be using the stage name "Celest 斯畾" (Sī Léi) for her future activities, explaining that her birth name '"Celest Chong Zhang Yu Hua" is "too long and awkward".

In October 2023, Chong reverted to using her Chinese birth name 张玉华 (Zhāng Yùhuá), citing familiarity reasons.

== Filmography ==
=== Television series ===
Year	Title	Role	Notes	Ref.
2000	Making Love			
2001	You Light Up My Life			
2001	All's Well, Ends Well			
2002	Feel 100%			
2003	Together Whenever			
2004	Hi-Fly (升空高飞)	Tina		
2004	Zero	Zhang Xinlin		
2005	The Proud Twins	Princess Taka		
2006	Love Young Man (爱上小男人)	Wen Bixian		
2007	Dui Juan Hua Kai			
2008	Crime Busters x 2	Margaret		
2009	Red Thread			
2009	Your Hand in Mine	Bai Shuixian		
2018	Titans		Guest appearance	
2019	The Umbrella Academy		Guest appearance	

=== Film ===
Year	Title	Role	Notes	Ref.
2000	Stories About Love			
2015	The Man in the Shadows	Olivia		
2021	Moore’s Void	Parmoona Cash	Won Best Actress at the Great Canadian Sci-Fi Film Festival	

== Discography ==
Chong's former singing career included being the lead singer in the all-female band Jungk, produced by Malcolm McLaren in 1998. She also sang "Voice of an Angel" for McLaren. On National Day she sang "Stand Up for Singapore". She was also the lead singer for a song called "Earth Song" regarding environmental awareness. For the film Stories About Love, she sang the title track "Sorry My Love". For the drama series You Light Up My Life, she sang the theme song "Distance" which was No. 1 on the Yes 933 Pop Charts. Chong was voted No. 1 for Most Captivating Voice on Singapore Press Holdings, Asiaone.com.

After a twelve-year absence from music, Chong released her first English solo single "I Got Him" on 31 August 2018, a heavy reggae-influenced upbeat song written by herself and Omar Martinez. She released a beautiful ballad titled "Masterpiece" on 14 February 2019.

=== Studio albums ===
- Belong To Myself (2001)
- Celest (2002)
- Snow Flakes (2004)
- Little Happiness (2006)

=== Singles ===
- "Earth Song" (2000)
- "I Got Him" (2018)
- "Masterpiece" (2019)
- "选择"
- "红兰花"
- "隐藏"
