= Bond of Strangers =

Canadian/Italian documentary film directed by Max Fraser

- DVD release cover
- Directed by: Max Fraser
- Produced by: Max Fraser
- Edited by: Brendan Preston
- Music by: Jordy Walker
- Release date: October 30, 2015
- Running time: 54 minutes
- Countries: Canada; Italy
- Language: English

Bond of Strangers: The Operation Husky Story is a 2015 historical military documentary, produced and directed by Max Fraser, that chronicles a 300 km-trek made by 10 Canadians through the mountains of Sicily in honour of the sacrifices of the Canadian soldiers who served there during the Second World War. They are part of Operation Husky 2013, a series of commemorative events that take place in Sicily on the 70th anniversary of the original Operation Husky in 1943.

Fraser's father, James T. Fraser, fought in the Italian campaign with the Hastings and Prince Edward Regiment. Fraser's goal in making Bond of Strangers was to raise awareness about this important, but often neglected, part of Canada's military history.

Veteran Sheridan Atkinson was part of the Italian campaign, and is featured prominently in the movie. Before his attendance at the Toronto screening of Bond of Strangers, he told the Toronto Sun, "the discussion of the war and Canada always ends up with Normandy. God bless those guys and I wouldn’t want to take anything way from them, but the participation of Canada in the Italian campaign ended up in filing cabinets with no recognition at all, which is sad.”

In 2017, Fraser produced a web-based companion to the documentary. Bond of Strangers - The OpHusky Digital Media Experience takes viewers into a journey through Sicily during the original OpHusky mission in 1943 and the 70th Anniversary Remembrance Trek in 2013.
