= Max Fraser =

Canadian filmmaker

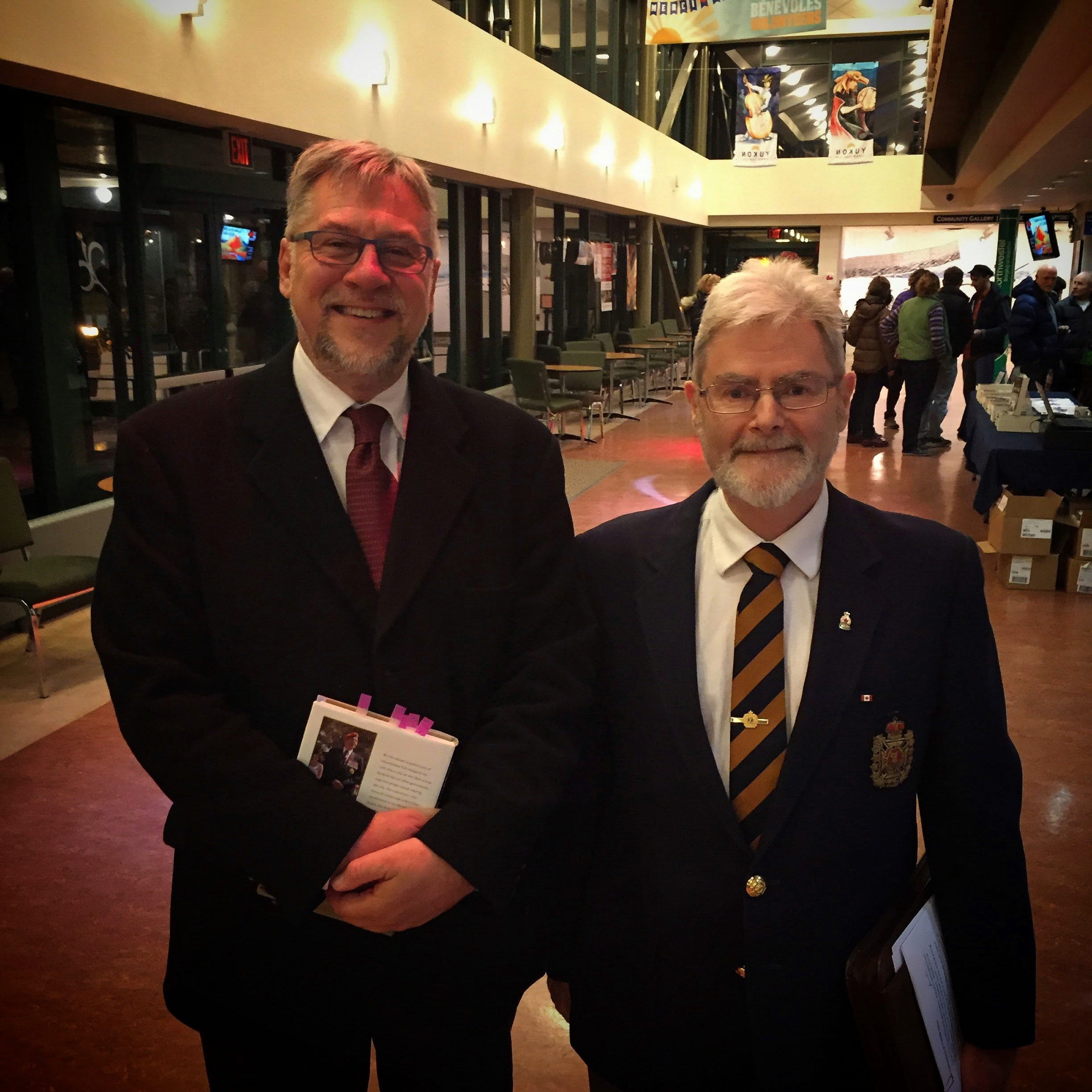
- Education: Langara College, Vancouver Community College
- Occupations: film director and film producer
- Website: www.hootmotionpics.com

Max Fraser is a Canadian filmmaker whose work focuses on Yukon and World War II remembrance topics.

== Filmography ==
	Title	Role	Notes
2009	Gloria's Silver Crossing	Executive producer, producer, director	Documentary short
2009	Jim from Dawson: Whitehorse Sucks!	Executive producer, producer, director	Comedy short
2009	Little John Country	Executive producer, producer, director	World Premiere at the Dawson City International Short Film Festival
2009	Madeline's Rock	Executive producer, producer, director	Documentary short
2009	Painting Red Square	Executive producer, producer, director	Video short
2011	Never Happen Here	Director	Documentary short
2013	Martinis of the Wilderness	Executive producer, producer, director	Documentary short
2015	Bond of Strangers	Producer, director, writer, Camera and Electrical Department	Remembrance Brothers Canada tour with military historian and author Mark Zuehlke.
2016	Broke Down Dawson Town	Producer	Comedy drama (2 parts)
2022	Polaris	Producer	Feature film
