= Goliath (film) =

- Film poster
- Directed by: Luke Villemaire
- Written by: Luke Villemaire
- Produced by: Sheetal Maya Nanda; Shannon Kook; Luke Villemaire
- Starring: Jessica Sipos; Michelle Mylett; Jon Cor; Shannon Kook
- Cinematography: Jordan Kennington
- Edited by: Craig Jay; Brittney Hockley
- Music by: Spencer Creaghan
- Production company: Twin 27 Productions
- Release date: October 25, 2019 (FCFF)
- Running time: 93 minutes
- Country: Canada
- Language: English

Goliath is a 2019 Canadian drama film written, directed, and produced by Luke Villemaire. It stars Jessica Sipos, Michelle Mylett, Jon Cor, and Shannon Kook. Sipos plays Robin Walker, who has to confront her harsh family when she returns home for the funeral of her father.

Goliath premiered at the Forest City Film Festival in October 2019 and was released on video on demand in February 2023.

== Plot ==
When Robin Walker (played by Jessica Sipos) returns to her small hometown for her father's funeral, she is forced to confront not only the strained relationships she left behind but also the personal struggles she had hoped to escape. Amid the grief and unresolved tensions, a deeply unsettling family secret emerges, one with the potential to unravel the delicate bonds still holding her family together.

== Cast ==
- Jessica Sipos as Robin Walker
- Michelle Mylett as Violet Walker
- Jon Cor as Garrett Walker
- Shannon Kook as Dylan
- Daniel Maslany as Parker
- Krista Bridges as Ellie
- Andrea Roth as Dianne Walker
- Jenny Raven as Tiffany
- Rob Stewart as Sheriff
- Emily Coutts as Jenna
- Rainbow Sun Francks as Adam
- Jeff Teravainen as Man in Bed

== Production ==
Villemaire conceived the film while he was a student at Ryerson University. More than $50,000 was raised through crowdfunding for the film. Filming took place in Quinte West, Ontario, in 2016. Villemaire described the experience of making Goliath as "the ultimate film school," noting the challenges and the "trial by fire" approach many first-time filmmakers endure.

== Reception ==
Bradley Gibson of Film Threat gave the film a 7 out of 10, writing, "Villemaire’s film would feel like a retread of the familiar prodigal child trope that pops up more often than it should if not for the strength of the performances. Sipos inhabits Robin artfully. In fact, all the roles are played with raw authenticity. Also, the cinematography and music production values are high, and the lighting stands out. There are many beautiful shots of the landscape and the water."
