= Zero (Singaporean TV series) =

- 零楼
- Genre: Dramedy; Fantasy
- Starring: Bryan Wong; Guo Liang; Adrian Pang
- Country of origin: Singapore
- Original language: Chinese with some English dialogue
- No. of episodes: 20

Production
- Running time: approx. 45 minutes

Original release
- Network: SPH MediaWorks Channel U
- Release: 1 December – 31 December 2004

Zero (零楼) is a Singaporean drama which aired on SPH MediaWorks Channel U in November 2004. This series was one of the last broadcast by SPH MediaWorks before it amalgamated with MediaCorp.

== Synopsis ==
Sam (Bryan Wong) is an ambitious man who stops at nothing to achieve his goals and takes things for granted. A schemer by nature, he has many enemies and was assaulted in a parking lot. He falls into a deep coma and goes to a place called "zero" (零楼) where he is met by "001" (Guo Liang). As Sam's bad deeds and good deeds all cancel out each other, the angels can't decide whether to send him to "basement 1" (hell) or "level 1" (heaven).

== Cast ==
- Bryan Wong as Wang Weide (Sam)
- Guo Liang as 001
- Celest Chong as Zhang Xinlin
- Adrian Pang as Insp Lee Yong Bang
- Quan Yi Fong as Du Xiaowei (Nurse Toh)
- Ix Shen as Liu Qingxiang
- Michelle Chia as guardian of level 1
- Apple Hong as Zhou Meili
- Li Wenhai as 5566
- Ong Ai Leng as 808
- Ezann Lee as Du Xiaoling
- Adam Chen
- Wong Woon Hong as 1003
- Kym Ng as bus driver
- Shaun Chen
- Bernard Tan as Dr Zheng Junping
- Johnny Ng as Charlie Chen
- Darren Lim
- Eelyn Kok as Fu Mingzhu
