= Jessica Sipos =

Canadian actress

- Born: Victoria, British Columbia, Canada
- Occupation: Actress
- Years active: 2013–present
- Children: 2
- Relatives: Shaun Sipos (brother)

Jessica Sipos is a Canadian actress. She is best known for playing Sarah on Chesapeake Shores, Hayley on UnREAL and Cassandra Savage on The CW’s Legends of Tomorrow.

== Life and career ==
Sipos was born in Victoria, British Columbia. She is of ethnic Hungarian descent from Croatia. Her older brother is actor Shaun Sipos.

She has had guest roles on the television series Dark Matter, Wynonna Earp, and Legends of Tomorrow, as well as recurring roles in Ascension and Slasher. Her film roles have included Dead on Campus; Cold Deck; Signed, Sealed, Delivered: To the Altar and A Daughter's Revenge. She plays the lead role in the Canadian movie Goliath.

== Filmography ==
Film roles
Year	Title	Role	Notes
2014	Dead on Campus	Leanna	
2015	Cold Deck	Kim	
2019	Goliath	Robin Walker	
2019	Dark Harbor	Olivia	
2019	Mistletoe Magic	Harper	

Television roles
Year	Title	Role	Notes
2014	Ascension	Jackie	3 episodes
2015–2017	Dark Matter	Tash	4 episodes
2016	Slasher	June Henry	6 episodes
2016	Legends of Tomorrow	Cassandra Savage	Episode: "Leviathan"
2016	UnREAL	Hayley	4 episodes
2016	UnREAL the Auditions	Hayley	Episode: "Hayley"
2017–2018	Wynonna Earp	Constance Clootie	Episodes: "No Future in the Past", "Waiting Forever for You"
2017–2022	Chesapeake Shores	Sarah Mercer	Recurring role, 40 episodes
2018	A Daughter's Revenge	Elle Spencer	Television film
2018	Signed, Sealed, Delivered: To the Altar	Jessica	Television film
2021	Charmed	Waverly Jameson	Episodes: "What to Expect When You're Expecting the Apocalypse", "The Storm Before the Calm"
2023	A Season for Family	Taylor	Hallmark Channel TV Movie
2025	Tracker	Sierra Allen	Episode: "Eurydice"
