= Geoff Klein =

Canadian film editor and director

Geoff Klein (born March 24, 1978) is a Canadian film and television editor and director from Montreal, Quebec. He is most noted for his work as an editor on the 2024 documentary film I Shall Not Hate, for which he received a Canadian Screen Award nomination for Best Editing in a Documentary at the 13th Canadian Screen Awards in 2025.

He was previously nominated for Best Editing in a Documentary Program or Series at the 5th Canadian Screen Awards in 2017 for his work on Interrupt This Program.

He directed two low-budget horror films, Bikini Girls on Ice in 2009 and Pinup Dolls on Ice in 2013.

His other credits as an editor have included the films Pink Lake, The Corruption of Divine Providence, Woodland Grey, Polaris, The Switch and Romin.
