= Alex Cardillo =

Irish-Canadian actor (born 1997)

- Born: January 15, 1997 (age 28); Dublin, Ireland
- Occupation: Actor
- Years active: 2008-2014

Alex Cardillo (born January 15, 1997) is an Irish-Canadian former actor. He played Mark Verrity, Penelope Verrity's (Michelle Forbes) son in the second season of the TV drama Durham County and Frost in the Canadian action film I Declare War.

== Personal life ==
Cardillo was born in Dublin, Ireland to an Irish mother and British father.

He was raised in Kenya. He currently resides in Ottawa, Ontario, Canada.

== Filmography ==
Film
Year	Film	Role	Notes
2008	Stopped	Ben	Short film
2012	The Phoenix	Ben	Short film
2012	I Declare War	Frost	
2014	Tell the World	Newsboy	
Television
Year	Title	Role	Notes
2009	Family Biz	Actor	Episode: "Don't Sweat the Small Stuff"
2009	Durham County	Mark Verrity	5 episodes Nominated – Young Artist Award for Best Performance in a TV Series - Recurring Young Actor 13 and Under
2009	My Nanny's Secret	Aiden	Lifetime Channel Original Movie
2010	18 to Life	Little Phil	Episode: "Hanging Pictures"
2010	Blue Mountain State	Kid #1	Episode: "Piss Test"
2010	You Lucky Dog	Alex	Hallmark Channel Original Movie
2010	The Stepson	Kid (uncredited)	TV movie
2010	The Perfect Teacher	Student (uncredited)	TV movie
2011	Almost Heroes	Young Peter	Episode: "Terry and Peter vs. Girls"
2011	The Yard	J.J.	6 episodes Nominated – Young Artist Award for Outstanding Young Ensemble in a TV Series
2012	The Ron James Show	Family Son	Episode: "New Year's Special"
