= Art Hindle =

Canadian actor and director

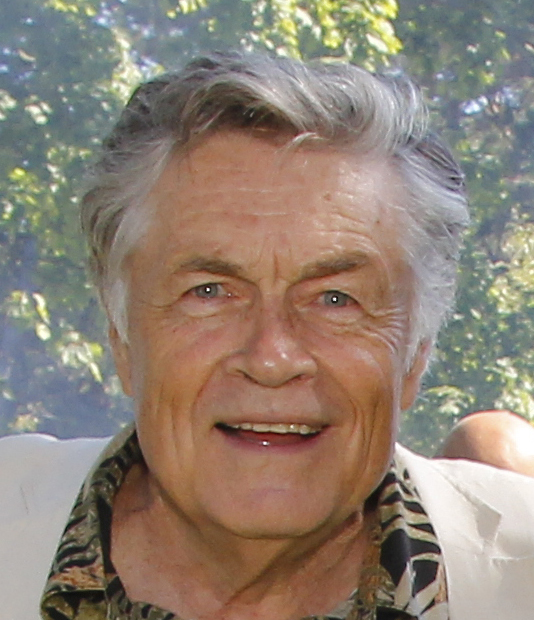
- Art Hindle at the 2014 CFC Annual BBQ
- Born: Arthur Hindle; July 21, 1948 (age 78); Halifax, Nova Scotia, Canada
- Occupations: Actor; television director
- Years active: 1971–present
- Relatives: Michael Kane (uncle)

Arthur Hindle (born July 21, 1948) is a Canadian actor and television director. He won the Gemini Award for Best Actor in a Continuing Leading Dramatic Role for his portrayal of news director Mike Fennell on the CTV drama E.N.G. (1989–94). His other notable television roles include Jeff Farraday on Dallas (1981–82), Harry Dobbs on North of 60 (1996–97), Pete Braga on Paradise Falls (2001–08), and Grandpa Hobbie on Holly Hobbie (2021–23).

Hindle is also known for his roles in the 1970s horror films Black Christmas (1974), Invasion of the Body Snatchers (1978), and The Brood (1979). He also played police officer Ted Jarvis in the cult classic sex comedy Porky's (1981) and its sequel Porky's II: The Next Day (1983).

== Early life and education ==
Hindle was born in Halifax, to a father who was in the Royal Canadian Navy. His uncle was actor Michael Kane.

For 12 years, he alternated living with his divorced parents in addition to living in foster homes. He grew up in Bowmanville, and later at The Beaches area of Toronto. He began acting in local plays as a teenager, and graduated from Riverdale Collegiate Institute in 1963.

Before he became an actor, Hindle modeled clothes in catalogs for Canadian companies Simpsons-Sears and Eaton's. He was also a stockbroker. He studied method acting under Eli Rill.

== Career ==
Hindle has made guest appearances in a long list of television programs in North America, and has also appeared in several movies, dating from 1971.

His first major role was in a biker movie, The Proud Rider, spawned by the popularity of Easy Rider. Hindle worked with a real motorcycle gang, Satan's Choice of Oshawa. It was during the production of this film that he almost changed his professional name to Jeremy Kane, as producers thought that Hindle should have a more obvious link to his uncle, actor Michael Kane.

In 1971, he was cast as Billy Duke in the film Face-Off. This film led to offers from Hollywood which he resisted until work dried up and Hindle, who had four children by this time, finally moved to Los Angeles in 1974.

He had a supporting role in the Canadian horror film Black Christmas in 1974. He had a pivotal supporting role in the 1978 remake of Invasion of the Body Snatchers. He then went onto playing a lead role in David Cronenberg's 1979 horror film The Brood and appeared in the 1981 teen sex comedy film Porky's as police officer Ted Jarvis. In the 1990s, he played the role of Harry Dobbs in the popular Canadian TV series, North of 60.

From the early 1990s, Hindle has also worked as a director. In 2001, he starred in, and directed episodes of, the award-winning series Paradise Falls which screened on the Showcase channel in Canada and cable stations in the U.S.

== Filmography ==
=== Films ===
- 1971 The Proud Rider
- 1971 Foxy Lady as Football Star
- 1971 Face-Off as Billy Duke
- 1974 Black Christmas as Chris Hayden
- 1976 A Small Town in Texas as "Boogie"
- 1978 Invasion of the Body Snatchers as Dr. Geoffrey Howell
- 1979 The Brood as Frank Carveth
- 1980 The Octagon as A.J.
- 1981 Porky's as Ted Jarvis
- 1982 Desperate Lives as Stan
- 1983 Porky's II: The Next Day as Ted Jarvis
- 1983 The Man Who Wasn't There as Ted Durand
- 1983 The Wild Pony as Frank Chase
- 1984 The Surrogate as Frank Waite
- 1984 Raw Courage as Roger Bower
- 1986 Say Yes as Luke
- 1987 From the Hip as Lieutenant Matt Sosha
- 1987 The Gunfighters (TV Movie) as Cole Everett
- 1988 Dixie Lanes as Sheriff Lewis Clark
- 1988 Into the Fire as Dirk Winfield
- 1989 Piramiddo no kanata ni: White Lion densetsu
- 1989 Speed Zone as "Flash"
- 1990 The World's Oldest Living Bridesmaid as Brian
- 1993 Liar, Liar (TV Movie) as Gilbert Jonathan "Gil" Farrow
- 1998 Ice (TV Movie) as US President
- 1998 Sleeping Dogs Lie as Ambrose Small
- 2000 Submerged as Sam
- 2001 Kept as Lance
- 2001 Stranded as Owen Marsh
- 2002 The Trip as Ted Oakley
- 2006 One Way as Russel Birk
- 2007 Lies and Crimes (TV Movie) as Captain Vic Bochner
- 2007 Blind Trust (TV Movie) as Attorney L.G. Mennick
- 2009 Offspring as George Chandler
- 2011 Monster Brawl as Sid "Sasquatch Sid" Tucker
- 2011 Moon Point as The Banana
- 2011 An Insignificant Harvey as Father Asher
- 2012 Two Hands to Mouth as Ron Baxter
- 2012 The Story of Luke as Mr. Nichols
- 2013 Real Gangsters as Mitchel McClane
- 2014 Big News from Grand Rock as Walter
- 2014 The Big Fat Stone as Philly Versi
- 2015 No Deposit as Joseph Ryan
- 2015 Sicilian Vampire as Detective Domenic Supray
- 2015 Full Out as Doctor
- 2016 The Void as Mitchell
- 2016 Sadie's Last Days on Earth as Mr. Scott
- 2017 Adam's Testament as Father Callaghan
- 2017 The Neighborhood as Artie
- 2017 The Performance as Dennis
- 2017 Happenstance as Robert
- 2018 The Joke Thief as Brian McCabe
- 2018 Robbery as Frank
- 2019 Astronaut as Joe
- 2021 Woodland Grey as Moses
- 2022 Nightalk as Captain Roberto
- 2024 Home Free as Herb Homur

=== Television ===
- 1975 Starsky & Hutch as John Colby (Episode: The Deadly Imposter)
- 1977 Barnaby Jones as Joseph (Episode: The Devil's Handmaiden)
- 1977 James at 15 as Jud Lawrence
- 1977 Kingston: Confidential as Tony Marino
- 1978 The Clone Master as Dr. Simon Shane
- 1981–1982 Dallas as Jeff Farraday
- 1985 Scarecrow and Mrs. King as Larry Crawford
- 1985 Airwolf as Karl Stern
- 1985 MacGyver as Dave Redding
- 1987 Hunter as Harry
- 1986–1987 Murder, She Wrote as Rod Wilson / Sam McKittrick
- 1988 21 Jump Street as Stafford
- 1988 Night Heat as Borden
- 1988 Street Legal as Karl Morgan
- 1989 Friday the 13th: The Series as McCabe (Episode: The Sweetest Sting)
- 1989 L.A. Law as Walter Goetz
- 1988–1989 Alfred Hitchcock Presents as Jack Gold / Alton Brooks
- 1989–1994 E.N.G. as Mike Fennell
- 1994 Matlock as Philip Chaney
- 1995 Kung Fu: The Legend Continues as Martin Bradshaw
- 1995 Walker, Texas Ranger as M.P. Bates
- 1997 The Arrow as Colonel Fairchild
- 1996–1997 Beverly Hills, 90210 as Detective Bill Rendell
- 1996–1997 North of 60 as Harry Dobbs
- 1998 Due South as Robert Bedford
- 1998 JAG as Captain Ward
- 1999 Millennium as John Saxum
- 1999 Total Recall 2070 as Frank Trower
- 2002–2003 Tom Stone as Neil McQuinn
- 2005 Canadian Case Files as Host
- 2001–2008 Paradise Falls as Pete Braga
- 2009 Too Late to Say Goodbye as Max Barber
- 2016–2018 Dot. Mister Sherman (voice)
- 2018 The Good Witch as Arthur Pershing
- 2018 Imposters as Mr. Hull Sr.
- 2018 Pride, Prejudice, and Mistletoe as Edward Fitzwilliam
- 2019 Le gala de Noël
- 2019 Christmas in Montana as Pops Carson
- 2021–2023 SurrealEstate as Carl Roman

== Awards and nominations ==
Institution	Year	Category	Work	Result
ACTRA Award	2022	Toronto Award of Excellence	—N/a	Won
Gemini Award	1990	Best Actor in a Continuing Leading Dramatic Role	E.N.G.	Won
Gemini Award	1993	Best Actor in a Continuing Leading Dramatic Role	E.N.G.	Nominated
Gemini Award	1994	Best Actor in a Dramatic Program or Mini-Series	Liar, Liar	Nominated
Gemini Award	1998	Best Guest Actor in a Dramatic Series	North of 60	Nominated
Toronto After Dark Film Festival	2018	Best Supporting Actor	Robbery	Won
