= Shaun Sipos =

Canadian actor (born 1981)

- Born: October 30, 1981 (age 44); Victoria, British Columbia, Canada
- Occupation: Actor
- Years active: 2001–present
- Height: 177.8 cm (5 ft 10 in)
- Spouse: Lindsey Morgan (m. 2023)
- Children: 1
- Relatives: Jessica Sipos (sister)

Shaun Sipos (born October 30, 1981) is a Canadian actor, known for playing Jack on the series Complete Savages (2004–2005), David Breck on Melrose Place (2009–2010), Eric Daniels on Life Unexpected (2010–2011), Aaron Whitmore on The Vampire Diaries (2013–2014), Adam Strange on Krypton (2018–2019), Luke Tillerson on Outer Range (2020–2023), David O'Donnell on Reacher (2022–2023).

== Life and career ==
Shaun Sipos was born in Victoria, British Columbia, and is of ethnic Hungarian descent from Croatia. He is the older brother of actress Jessica Sipos.

Sipos' television credits include a series regular role on the sitcom Maybe It's Me, guest starring roles on Smallville, Black Sash, ER, and CSI: Miami, and a supporting role on Special Unit 2. His feature film credits include Final Destination 2, The Skulls III, Superbabies: Baby Geniuses 2, Comeback Season, The Grudge 2, and Lost Boys: The Tribe. In 2009, Sipos was cast as David Breck in The CW's Melrose Place, a reboot of the 1990s Fox primetime soap opera of the same name.

Sipos appeared in the series Life Unexpected as Eric Daniels, a teacher who becomes a love interest of the main character Lux Cassidy (Britt Robertson). He played a regular role on Syfy's space fantasy Dark Matter as Devon Taltherd.

== Personal life ==
Sipos married actress Lindsey Morgan on September 21, 2023, in Austin, Texas.

== Filmography ==
=== Film ===
Year	Title	Role
2003	Final Destination 2	Frankie
2004	The Skulls III	Ethan Rawlings
2004	Superbabies: Baby Geniuses 2	Brandon
2006	Comeback Season	Skylar Eckerman
2006	The Grudge 2	Michael
2008	Lost Boys: The Tribe	Kyle
2009	Stoic	Mitch Palmer
2009	Curve of Earth	Wade
2009	Lost Dream	Giovanni
2009	Rampage	Evan Drince
2009	Happy in the Valley	Wade
2011	Hick	Blane
2011	Enter Nowhere	Hans Neumann
2013	Texas Chainsaw 3D	Darryl
2013	Heart of the Country	Lee
2014	The Remaining	Jack Turner
2017	The Babymoon	Trace
2017	The Sandman	Wyatt
2018	For the Love of George	Luke
2021	Shadow of Privilege	Giovanni
2021	Night Raiders	Randy
2025	Black Diamond	Teft

=== Television ===
Year	Title	Role	Notes
2001	Maybe It's Me	Nick Gibson	Main cast (8 episodes)
2001	Special Unit 2	Teen Guy	Episode: "The Wall"
2003	Smallville	Chloe's Boy Thing	Episode: "Rush"
2003	Black Sash	Julian	2 episodes
2004–2005	Complete Savages	Jack Savage	Main cast (19 episodes)
2005	CSI: Miami	Gabe Hammond	Episode: "Urban Hellraisers"
2007	ER	Nick	Episode: "Crisis of Conscience"
2007	Shark	Trevor Boyd	7 episodes
2009	Southland	Dwayne	Episode: "Unknown Trouble"
2009–2010	Melrose Place	David Breck	Main cast (18 episodes)
2010	CSI: Crime Scene Investigation	Daniel Peidre	Episode: "Take My Life, Please!"
2010–2011	Life Unexpected	Eric Daniels	12 episodes
2013	A Mother's Rage	Calvin	Television film
2013–2014	The Vampire Diaries	Aaron Whitmore	8 episodes
2014	The Michaels	Michael Breakstone	Television film
2016	Dark Matter	Devon Taltherd	Main cast (7 episodes)
2017	Major Crimes	Trent Myers	Episode: "Heart Failure"
2018	Broken Sidewalk	Reed	Episode: "Pilot"
2018	Insomnia	Brad	8 episodes
2018–2019	Krypton	Adam Strange	Main cast (20 episodes)
2022–2024	Outer Range	Luke Tillerson	Main cast (14 episodes)
2023–2024	Reacher	David O'Donnell	Main cast (8 episodes)
2025	High Potential	Derek	Guest (1 Episode)
