= Patrick Roach =

Canadian actor and investor (born 1969)

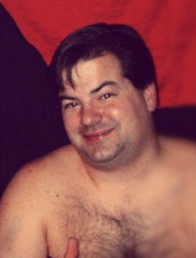
- Born: March 4, 1969 (age 57); Newfoundland And Labrador, Canada
- Occupations: Actor, investor
- Years active: 1999–present
- Spouse: Kelly Roach
- Children: 2

Patrick Roach (born March 4, 1969) is a Canadian actor and producer. He is best known for playing Randy on the television series Trailer Park Boys.

== Early life ==
Roach was born in Newfoundland And Labrador and raised in Dartmouth, Nova Scotia, to parents Jim and Julie Roach. He attended Saint Mary’s University in Halifax, Nova Scotia, and graduated in 1992. He married his current wife Kelly Roach on May 3, 2023. He has two children from a previous marriage, Rebecca Roach and Coady Roach.

== Career ==
Roach is known for his large gut, as showcased both in Trailer Park Boys and Swearnet: The Movie.

For the first four years he appeared on Trailer Park Boys, Roach continued to work as a regional sales manager for Sparkling Springs, a bottled water company. He would film Trailer Park Boys on his vacation time, but in July 2004 he quit his job (which he had held since 1993) in order to concentrate on acting. He also appeared in a commercial for the telephone service Vonage.

When asked what it was like appearing shirtless in nearly every episode of Trailer Park Boys, Roach replied that "it was uncomfortable at first, but after everyone in Canada has seen you, what the hell". His character works as Assistant Trailer Park Supervisor and Weekend Trailer Park Supervisor. His character, Randy, is in an on-again/off-again relationship with the Trailer Park Supervisor Jim Lahey (John Dunsworth), whom he always calls Mr. Lahey. Lahey is largely dependent on his assistant for his daily care. Roach has commented in an interview that Randy is gay, though the show portrays the character as bisexual.

He was also in the original Trailer Park Boys short film before it was made into a series. His character was the basis for Randy, but was named Patrick and wore a shirt. In between shooting the show, Roach and Dunsworth traveled across Canada performing at comedy clubs and other music events as a stand-up/improv act. After Dunsworth's death in 2017, Roach created his own stand-up comedy show called Randy's Cheeseburger Picnic.

From 2009 to 2013, Roach worked at Investors Group as a personal finance consultant. In 2010, Roach reunited with many of his former Trailer Park Boys castmates in the new series The Drunk and On Drugs Happy Fun Time Hour.

== Personal life ==
Roach married his wife, Kelly on May 3, 2023. They have no children, however Pat has two children from a previous marriage.

== Filmography ==
=== Movies ===
- 1999 Trailer Park Boys: as Patrick Lewis
- 2006 Trailer Park Boys: The Movie as Randy
- 2009 Trailer Park Boys: Countdown to Liquor Day as Randy (credited as Pat Roach)
- 2014 Trailer Park Boys: Don't Legalize It as Randy (as Pat Roach)
- 2014 Swearnet: The Movie as himself / Swearman
- 2014 Swearnet Live as Pat Roach / Randy
- 2024 Standing on the Shoulders of Kitties as Randy

=== Television ===
- TV Movies and TV shows
- 2001–2007, 2014–2018 Trailer Park Boys as Randy
- 2004 Trailer Park Boys Christmas Special as Randy TV Movie
- 2008 Say Goodnight to the Bad Guys as Randy (as Pat Roach)
- 2011 The Drunk and on Drugs Happy Funtime Hour as Pat Roach 2 episodes 2011
- 2014 Epic Meal Time as Randy 2 episodes
- 2014 Trailer Park Boys: Live in Dublin as Randy
- 2014 GGN: Snoop Dogg's Double G News Network as Randy 1 episode
- 2014 Trailer Park Boys: Live at the North Pole as Randy
- 2015 Trailer Park Boys: Drunk, High & Unemployed as Randy
- 2016 Garage Talks as Randy 1 episode
- 2019–2020 Trailer Park Boys: The Animated Series as Randy
- 2021–present, Trailer Park Boys: Jail, as Randy
- 2021 “This Hour has 22 Minutes” as Jason Kenney.
- 2021–present, The Roach Approach, as himself
