= Woodland Grey =

- Promotional release poster
- Directed by: Adam Reider
- Written by: Adam Reider; Jesse Toufexis
- Produced by: John Fallon
- Starring: Jenny Raven; Ryan Blakely; Art Hindle
- Edited by: Geoff Klein
- Music by: Daniele Carretta
- Production companies: Spectropia Pictures; Franky Films; Vibe Check Entertainment
- Distributed by: Filmoption Int.
- Release date: November 22, 2021 (BITS)
- Running time: 91 minutes
- Country: Canada
- Language: English

Woodland Grey is a 2021 Canadian independent horror film directed and co-written by Adam Reider, and starring Jenny Raven, Ryan Blakely, and Art Hindle.

== Cast ==
- Jenny Raven as Emily
- Ryan Blakely as William
- Art Hindle as Moses

== Release ==
Woodland Grey premiered at the Blood in the Snow Canadian Film Festival (BITS) on November 22, 2021. It screened at the Another Hole in the Head Film Festival in San Francisco, California, in December 2021. It is screened at the Cinema on the Bayou festival in Lafayette, Louisiana, in January 2022.

== Reception ==
=== Critical response ===
Dakota Dahl of Rue Morgue praised the film's music and the "unnatural on purpose" performances of Raven and Blakely, but referred to Hindle as "brutally under utilized". Dahl lamented the film as being "slow and weird for weirdness sake, in a way that is neither thoughtful nor rewarding"; comparing it unfavourably to surrealist films by David Lynch, Dahl wrote that, unlike Lynch's works, Woodland Grey "doesn't seem to have that original vision, instead opting to provide clues and red herrings that point to multiple conclusions, while really sticking the landing with none of them."

=== Accolades ===
Year	Award	Category	Recipient	Result	Ref(s)
2021	18th Another Hole in the Head Film Festival	Best Horror Feature	The Monsters Without	Won	
