= Polaris (2022 film) =

- Directed by: Kirsten Carthew
- Written by: Kirsten Carthew
- Produced by: Paul Cadieux; Kirsten Carthew; Max Fraser; Alyson Richards
- Starring: Viva Lee; Muriel Dutil
- Cinematography: David Schuurman
- Edited by: Geoff Klein
- Music by: Judith Gruber-Stitzer
- Release date: 14 July 2022 (Fantasia International Film Festival)
- Running time: 92 minutes
- Country: Canada
- Language: English

Polaris is a 2022 Canadian action film directed by Kirsten Carthew. The film stars Viva Lee as Sumi, a young girl in a frozen, post-apocalyptic 2144. With the aid of a strange companion, she survives blood-thirsty marauders to prevail.

The film is thematically related to, but not a direct expansion of, Carthew's 2015 short film Fish Out of Water.

== Cast ==
- Viva Lee as Sumi
- Muriel Dutil as Dee
- Khamisa Wilsher as Frozen Girl

== Release ==
The film premiered at the Fantasia International Film Festival on 14 July 2022. It later screened in the Borsos Competition at the 2022 Whistler Film Festival.

== Reception ==
Allan Hunter of Screen Daily wrote that "Muriel Dutil brings a scene-stealing warmth to the role of Dee, a scarred, hermit-like older woman who gives shelter to Sumi, whilst Viva Lee makes Sumi herself a fierce, intelligent central figure." Nick Allen of RogerEbert.com called it the "kind of film in which the ambition of the project can drive the curiosity of the narrative more than the plot." Kurt Halfyard of ScreenAnarchy wrote that "Carthew often eschews clean point A to point B storytelling in favour of the poetic. The film wants you to accept its mysteries, and the geography, of its harsh world without explanation. It wants to you feel the birth of mythology. It does so with more than a little grit."

Deirdre Crimmins of Rue Morgue wrote that "when taken for its visuals, incredible performances and world-building, POLARIS is a worthy entry in post-apocalyptic cinema’s hallowed halls. Frustratingly, the extra layers of forced fables get in the way of its ascending to greatness." Rachel Ho from Exclaim similarly praised the film, describing it as bold with an "obvious environmental message". The reviewer concluded that the "marriage between beautiful and violent visuals, captivating communication, and poignant themes is simply wonderful".

At Whistler, David Schuurman won the award for Best Cinematography in a Borsos Competition Film, and Lee received an honourable mention for Best Performance in a Borsos Competition film.
