= The Captured Bird =

2012 short horror film by Jovanka Vuckovic

- Poster
- Directed by: Jovanka Vuckovic
- Written by: Jovanka Vuckovic
- Produced by: Jason Lapeyre
- Starring: Skyler Wexler
- Cinematography: Karim Hussain
- Edited by: Douglas Buck
- Production company: Osaka Sunset Pictures
- Release date: 2012
- Running time: 12 minutes
- Country: Canada

The Captured Bird is a 2012 short Canadian horror film written and directed by Jovanka Vuckovic, produced by Jason Lapeyre and executive produced by Guillermo del Toro.

== Synopsis ==
A little girl (Skyler Wexler) drawing chalk figures on a sidewalk is drawn to a decrepit old mansion. Inside, she witnesses the birth of five horrifying apparitions. They creep towards her, determined to get outside the building and into the world.

== Crew ==
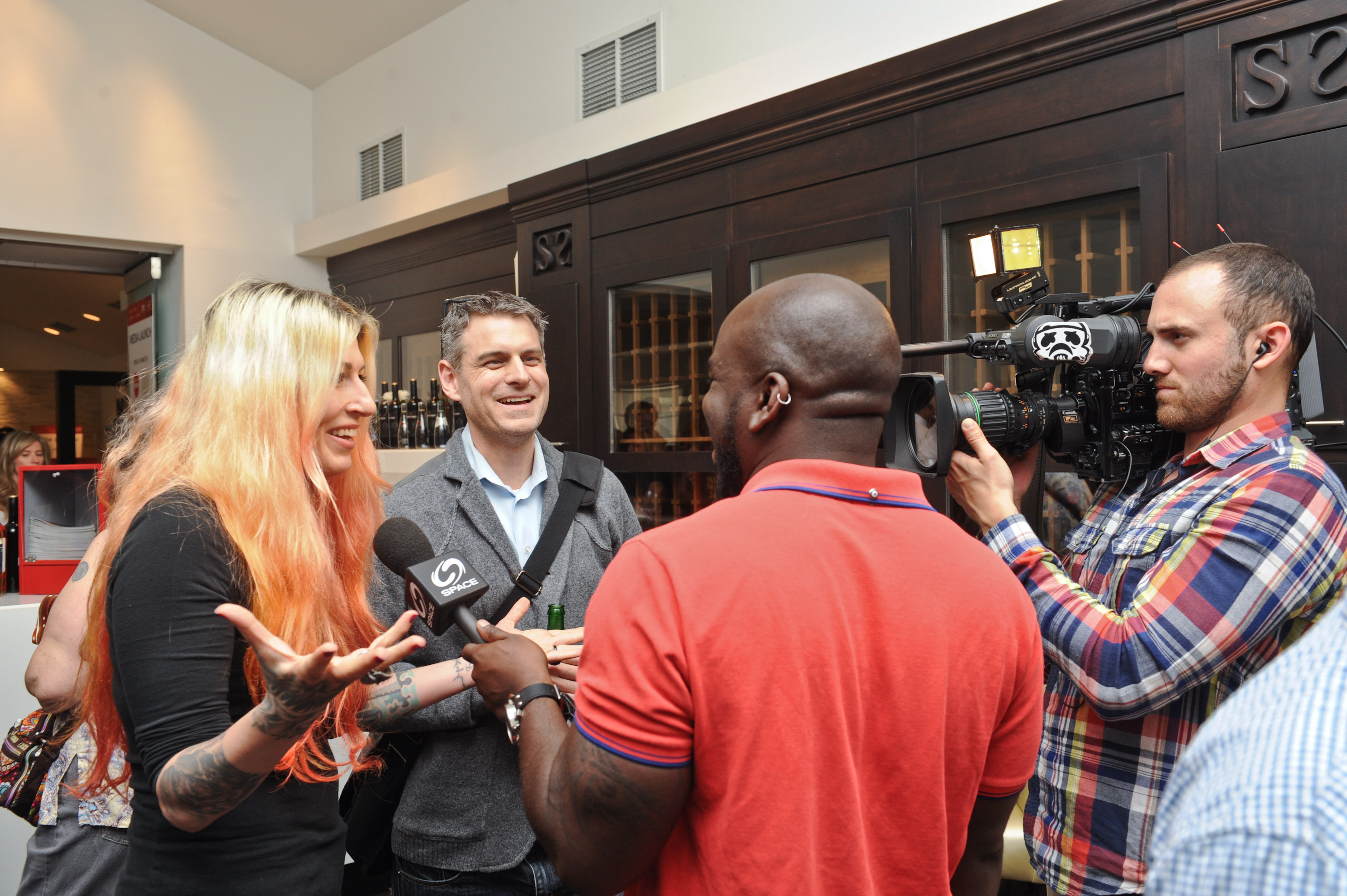
Jovanka Vuckovic (1st left) and Jason Lapeyre (2nd left) at the 2012 CFC Worldwide Short Film Festival Media Launch.

As a result of Vuckovic's reputation in the horror world and former position as editor-in-chief of Rue Morgue magazine, her first film project attracted a world class crew of experienced horror filmmakers. Guillermo del Toro is the executive producer for the film, Karim Hussain is the director of photography, Douglas Buck is the editor, and the special effects and monsters were designed and built by Spectral Motion.

== Soundtrack ==
The score for the film is written and performed by the heavy metal band Redeemer.

== Reception ==
In 2020, Screen Rant included the film in a list of scariest short horror films on YouTube, praising the film's "haunting atmosphere, stunning visuals, and unnerving performances".
