= The Man in the Shadows =

- Directed by: Joshua Fraiman
- Written by: Adam Tomlinson
- Produced by: Brigitte Kingsley; Tasso Lakas; Adam Tomlinson; (executive producers; Andrew Cymek; Brigitte Kingsley; Adam Tomlinson)
- Starring: Sarah Jurgens; Adam Tomlinson; Nick Baillie; Nola Augustson; Rebecca Amzallag; Alison Louder; Celest Chong
- Cinematography: Andrew Cymek
- Edited by: Andrew Cymek
- Music by: Adrian Ellis
- Production companies: Good Soldier Films, Thunder Wolf
- Distributed by: Tombstone Distribution
- Release dates: 1 June 2015 (Dances With Films); 22 September 2015 (Cinéfest)
- Running time: 89 minutes
- Country: Canada
- Language: English

The Man in the Shadows (US/UK video release: The Shadow Man) is a 2015 Canadian supernatural horror film, the first feature film directed by Joshua Fraiman and written by co-star and co-producer Adam Tomlinson, based on a personal experience, as well as on reports by "millions of people around the world" of so-called shadow people, a phenomenon associated with sleep paralysis. The plot centres around a prescription drug-addicted newlywed photographer (Sarah Jurgens) who appears to be stalked by a dark man in a brimmed hat who follows her from her nightmares into reality. Rachel is aided by William (Adam Tomlinson) who has been investigating the "Hat Man" phenomenon.

== Plot ==
Rachel Darwin, a pregnant woman going through a career crisis, has recurring dreams in which a shadow man wearing a fedora forcibly removes a deformed baby from her womb. Searching online, she discovers a world of night sufferers like herself, visited by watchers while they sleep. Her husband Scott believes that her experiences are hallucinations born from a subconscious still coping with his previous infidelity and a fear of childbirth. She seeks help and determines she is suffering from sleep paralysis. Troublingly, she also sees the "Hat Man" while awake, as a distorted blur in the background of a photograph, or a flicker in the corner of an eye. Rachel believes she may be being stalked by a malevolent supernatural entity.

At her regular group therapy session for recovering addicts, Rachel shares her experience and befriends the only person who believes her, a strange man named William who claims to suffer from a similar sleep paralysis and visions. Rachel goes to William's apartment to learn more about his investigations into shadow people. His research has convinced him that multidimensional beings surround everyone, creatures who feed on human souls.

Rachel is now even more terrified. She slips into an intoxicated dream confronted by horrors from her past. The nightmares get worse and Rachel begins to struggle as she slips between reality and nightmare. Scott takes her on a weekend getaway to an isolated winter cabin to take Rachel's mind off the Hat Man and rekindle their feelings for each other.

Meanwhile, William examines photographs he secretly took of Rachel during group therapy and sees the Hat Man standing behind her. Rachel continues dreaming of the Hat Man at night and catching brief glimpses of him during the day. Frustrated with Rachel's aloofness and strange behaviour during her waking nightmares, a drunken Scott tries to rape her. Rachel knocks him out and returns to the city in their car.

Rachel spends the night at William's. He shows her the pictures he took of her, but the Hat Man is not there. Rachel believes him; the same thing happens to photographs she has taken. Rachel and William have sex. He is sure that, with her help, he can put a stop the shadow figure.

The next morning, Scott wakes and has his legal assistant Sally pick him up. Scott learns from the recovery group leader that Rachel was last seen with William. Scott bribes the group leader for William's address.

William hypnotizes Rachel in an effort to explore her subconscious and confront the shadow man. Rachel once more has a vision of the Hat Man removing the baby from her womb. Rachel sees her childhood home, where the shadow man appears behind Rachel's mother after she kills herself in the bathtub. Rachel sees William's apartment and her own hypnotism session. William realizes that Rachel is astral projecting. She sees the Hat Man appear and kill William by supernatural means. Rachel stabs herself in order to wake up, and discovers William has indeed been killed.

Arriving at William's during the attempt to fight the shadow man, Scott finds the door locked. The Hat Man attacks Rachel, who wrests his knife away and stabs him. He dissipates. Scott tries speaking with Rachel through the door, and she realizes that her belly is bleeding. The Hat Man reforms out of the shadows and stabs Rachel repeatedly to death. The door then unlocks on its own, and Scott discovers to his horror the two corpses.

Scott is arrested for the murders. During questioning, Scott realizes that his wife was telling the truth when he sees the Hat Man materialize in a photograph as well as behind the interrogating detective.

== Cast ==
- Sarah Jurgens as Rachel Darwin
- Adam Tomlinson as William
- Nick Baillie as Scott Darwin
- Nola Augustson as Group Leader
- Rebecca Amzallag as Sally
- Alison Louder as Kate
- Celest Chong as Olivia
- Manuela Casinha as Addict
- Iryna Sidaras

== Production ==
=== Background and inspiration ===
Adam Tomlinson first clarified what was meant by the "inspired by true events" tagline at the film's post-premiere question-and-answer session; that the core story is based on his personal experience of seeing "a hat man" and then discovering his nightmare sighting was a worldwide phenomenon. Tomlinson's fascination with shadow people began with a nightmare in which he was being followed by a man in a hat, and then awakening to find the man was in his bedroom, watching him. He actually forgot about it until a friend told him of a similar dream. Tomlinson then turned to the Internet, and found thousands of similar reports from around the globe: "No one really knows what they are ... You wake up from a dream and find a man in a hat standing over you or sitting on your bed and you're unable to move." Tomlinson said shadow people first gained prominence in 1999 when Art Bell mentioned them on a radio show. More than 4,000 people responded with their own reports of encountering shadowy figures after waking. However, according to co-executive producer Brigitte Kingsley, "People through hundreds of years have seen this figure, or shadow person appearing in their dreams, causing sleep paralysis and sometimes seen in waking life as well". Estimates of how many people experience sleep paralysis vary from 5 percent to 60 percent; the scientific explanation for it is "a disconnect between body and mind" in which one becomes mentally aware before the body "wakes up" from its paralyzed state, potentially a terrifying experience, especially if, as frequently happens, these episodes are accompanied by hallucinations and the sensation of breathlessness. There may be a sense of an intruder:

shadow figures, malevolent watchers and the Man In the Hat. The Old Testament is filled with stories of night terrors. In the Middle Ages, people were visited by demons and incubus. The word "nightmare" refers to the Scandinavian "mara", a spirit sent to torment or suffocate sleepers.

=== Writing and characterization ===
Tomlinson wrote much of the script while living with his parents in Grimsby, Ontario, and insisted on the factual basis of his story: "It's fiction based on real life ... Everything is based on fact. I think that's scarier because it's real." The Man in the Shadows is the first full-length film Tomlinson has both written, co-produced, and starred in. His character is a Fox Mulder-like character "who walks the main character down the path of learning about shadow people." The downward spiral the main character experiences was inspired by interrupting comments made by a homeless man who approached Tomlinson while talking to a friend about shadow people: the man approached him and said: "They will ruin your life and take all your money." Those comments "set the tone for the journey the main character endures."

Sarah Jurgens is the actress who portrays that main character, Rachel Darwin, a photographer addicted to prescription drugs who begins to lose her sense of reality as she grapples with her broken marriage and her nightmares. According to Jurgens, the most challenging thing about this project was "arcing" the character's descent into delusion.

The Man In The Shadows gave me the permission to explore the experience of being haunted, hunted and stalked ... I was given the opportunity to live in a state of mental unraveling. I enjoyed the challenge of playing a character who was wrestling with truth and illusion, experiencing the slippage of her own sanity.

=== Filming ===
Joshua Fraiman's background in film was primarily as a cinematographer, with The Man in the Shadows representing his directorial debut. Principal photography took place over a tight twelve days in Toronto, Muskoka, and Port Perry. At least 50% of the material written into the original draft was cut.

== Release ==
The Man in the Shadows had its world premiere at the Dances with Films Festival in Los Angeles, on 1 June 2015, and its Canadian premiere at Cinéfest Sudbury International Film Festival on 22 September 2015, where it was presented by Fraiman and Kingsley, who grew up in Sudbury and still has family there. The film was also chosen as an Official Selection of the 2015 Scare-A-Con Film Festival where Jurgens was nominated for a Best Actress Award, and the film nominated for a Best Feature Award.

=== Home media and streaming ===
The Man in the Shadows was expected to debut on iTunes in Canada some time in Spring 2016, and globally in June. The DVD was released in Canada on 16 December 2016, including special features, deleted scenes, and feature length audio commentary, the feature run time 88 minutes. In the UK, a DVD was released on 16 October 2017 from High Fliers Films. In the US, both DVD and VOD releases occurred on 31 October 2017 from Sony Pictures Home Entertainment. The special features include deleted scenes and audio commentary by director Joshua Fraiman, writer Adam Tomlinson, and executive producer Andrew Cymek.

== Reception ==
=== Critical response ===
The Man in the Shadows received mostly negative reviews upon its release, with criticism directed towards the film's acting, and script. Critics also felt disappointed that the film failed to explore the real-life phenomenon which it was based on.

Peter Hopkins of HorrorScreamsVideoVault stated that, while the film's story was intriguing, the result was "a boring plodding mess". Hopkins criticized the film for its drawn out scenes, and finale. Shannon McGrew from NightmarishConjurings was highly critical of the film, panning the film's acting, lack of chemistry from the film's leads, storyline, and script. McGrew concluded his review by writing, "If you want a film as background noise in which you don’t have to pay any attention to it, then check out The Shadow Man. However, if you want to save 89 minutes, I suggest watching something else." Ian Sedensky of Culture Crypt gave the film a score of 45 out of 100, offering similar criticism towards the film's story, script, and lack of chemistry between the two leads. Sedensky also felt the film never fully explored the phenomenon which it was inspired by, and lacked sufficient depth to warrant any interest.

=== Nominations ===
- Scare-A-Con Film Festival • Best Feature • Best Actress

== Sequel ==
Tomlinson had already written the sequel by the time of the film's release; filming would depend on the success of the original.
