= Comeback Season =

2006 film

- Film poster
- Directed by: Bruce McCulloch
- Written by: Bruce McCulloch
- Starring: Ray Liotta
- Cinematography: Jamie Anderson
- Edited by: Mike Munn
- Music by: Lesley Barber
- Distributed by: THINKFilm; Myriad Pictures
- Release date: April 30, 2006 (Tribeca)
- Running time: 95 minutes
- Countries: United States; Canada
- Language: English

Comeback Season is a 2006 film directed by Bruce McCulloch. It stars Ray Liotta as Walter Pearce, a married man who, with the help of local football star Skylar Eckerman (Sipos), tries to win back his wife (Headly) after cheating on her. Filming took place in Calgary, Alberta.

The film premiered at the 2006 Tribeca Film Festival, and released to DVD in the United States on March 27, 2007.

== Plot ==
Walter's daughter, Chloe, gets engaged at a family dinner. After Chloe's fiancé says that he hopes to be half as good a man as Walter, Walter feels guilty and admits to everyone that he had an affair with his secretary. Walter subsequently loses everything—his wife kicks him out of the house, his daughters want nothing to do with him, HR fires him after finding out about the affair with his secretary, and all but his Sears credit card are denied.

Having no where else to go, Walter moves in with his equally selfish next-door neighbor, Skylar. Skylar is the town's egocentric high school football star who has just lost his prospective college scholarship after injuring his knee. Prior to his injury, Skylar perpetually mistreated others, especially the college football recruiters and his former flame Chloe (who happens to be Walt's daughter). Skylar's injury deepens his self-involved attitude and he spends his days wallowing in self-pity. Both in a slump, the men help each other appreciate what they had taken for granted for so long.

Walt quickly realizes that the only thing that ever mattered was his family. For the remainder of the film, Walt unsuccessfully tries to win back his family through various scenes. When the family asks Walter to have a STI test, Walt realizes that by not putting his family first, he had irresponsibly put his wife's life at risk. Walt realizes that his selfish actions not only had life-altering consequences for himself but also lasting implications for his family. Disgusted by her father's indiscretions and his inability to live with his own actions, Chloe uninvites her father to her wedding. On Chloe's wedding day, Walter's family finally forgives him after he sends them a video on the camcorder his wife gave him before their separation.

While living together, Walt encourages Skylar to continue to train despite his injury, using at-home physical therapy techniques such as a weighted vest in a pool. After weeks of training Skylar goes to a University of Washington recruiter tryout and impresses the coaches when he hits his targets 60 yards away. This ultimately leads to a mascot scholarship with the potential to play after his surgery. Learning from Walt's missteps of not appreciating what he had, Skylar realizes his feelings for Chloe and asks her to Prom. Coincidentally, Skylar and Christine discover they are going to the same college in the Fall. The final scene shows Skylar and Christine driving to the University of Washington, hinting at a potential romantic future for the pair.

== Cast ==
- Ray Liotta as Walter Pearce
- Shaun Sipos as Skylar Eckerman, Walter's next-door neighbor and the town's star football player who injures his knee.
- Glenne Headly as Deborah Pearce, Walter's wife
- Rachel Blanchard as Chloe Pearce, Walter older daughter
- Brooke Nevin as Christine Pearce, Walter older daughter
- Brendan Fehr as Paul, Chloe's fiancé
- Josh Emerson as Dinky
