= Cold Deck =

- Poster
- Directed by: Zack Bernbaum
- Written by: Stéfano Gallo; Jason LaPeyre; Slater Jewell-Kemker
- Produced by: Jeff Glickman; Jesse D. Ikeman
- Starring: Stéfano Gallo; Kjartan Hewit; Jessica Sipos; Kate Trotter; Robert Knepper; Paul Sorvino
- Cinematography: Kris Belchevski
- Edited by: Jonathan Eagan
- Music by: Erica Procunier
- Production companies: Sudden Storm Productions; Scooping Owl Productions
- Distributed by: Screen Media Films
- Release date: December 1, 2015
- Running time: 80 minutes
- Country: Canada
- Language: English

Cold Deck is a 2015 Canadian thriller film directed by Zack Bernbaum, written by Stéfano Gallo, Jason LaPeyre, Slater Jewell-Kempker, and starring Gallo, Robert Knepper, and Paul Sorvino. Gallo plays a compulsive gambler who, after a losing streak, accepts an offer by a local underworld figure (Sorvino) to rob a high stakes poker game hosted by a rich banker (Knepper).

== Plot ==
Bobby, a compulsive gambler, lives with his invalid mother, Audrey, who disapproves of his gambling habit, as gambling was his father's ruin. Bobby dates Kim, a waitress at Chips' gaming hall, where he spends most of his time in poker games. As Audrey's bills pile up and Bobby's losing streak continues, Bobby's friend Ben suggests Bobby enter a high stakes poker game he has heard about and share the winnings. Convinced that the bankers will be easy prey, they steal a car to raise enough money for the buy-in. When this is not enough, Bobby steals his mother's life savings.

The game is hosted by a wealthy man known as Turk. Amused to see Bobby there, Chips vouches for him, though Bobby is frustrated to see that he will be competing against another skilled player. Chips and Bobby easily eliminate the bankers, and when they are the only ones left, Turk takes out a suitcase that contains $250,000. Chips wins the pot despite not looking at his cards, frustrating Bobby. When he returns home, Bobby's mother kicks him out as he apologizes. Desperate, he moves in with Kim, who makes him agree to get his life in order if they are to be serious.

Realizing that Turk keeps the game's pot poorly-guarded and in the open, Chips offers to hire Bobby to rob the next monthly game, which he will attend. Bobby initially refuses, but when he and Ben become depressed over their dead-end jobs at a factory floor, Ben talks him into it. Bobby and Ben storm the poker game with shotguns and tear gas. When Turk is reluctant to hand over the pot, they threaten his child. Although Chips is frustrated with their over-the-top entrance and lack of warning over the tear gas, he splits the take with them; both receive $50,000.

Bobby repays his mother, settles his debts, and upgrades her care to include a new experimental drug. Chips provides an alibi for him, telling Turk that he has security footage of Bobby at the gaming hall. When Kim finds out how Bobby got the money, she makes him swear to go straight and avoid Chips. Bobby does so but asks why she hates Chips, guessing that she dated him. Kim confirms this and says that Chips once told her that he cheated Bobby's father out of a major win. Enraged, Bobby confronts Chips, who throws him out and turns in Ben to Turk.

After killing Ben, Turk goes to Bobby's house. Bobby offers to help Turk get to Chips. Though Turk at first refuses to believe Chips was responsible for the heist, he agrees to Bobby's plan. Kim, an aspiring actress, arranges a meeting between Chips and Bobby, pretending to set up Bobby. Bobby talks Chips into playing one final game of poker to settle their dispute. As Bobby wins, Turk enters the room and kills Chips and his henchmen. As Turk deliberates over whether to kill Bobby, the police enter and kill him. Bobby escapes the bloodbath and thanks Kim for her help in setting it up.

== Cast ==
- Stéfano Gallo as Bobby
- Kjartan Hewit as Ben
- Jessica Sipos as Kim
- Kate Trotter as Audrey
- Robert Knepper as Turk
- Paul Sorvino as Chips

== Production ==
Shooting began in Toronto, Ontario, in October 2014.

== Release ==
Screen Media Films released it on video on demand on December 1, 2015, and it played theatrically in a limited release on December 4. It was released on DVD in April 2016.

== Reception ==
Justin Lowe of The Hollywood Reporter called it "even less compelling than a game of gin rummy with grandma". Peter Howell of The Toronto Star rated it 1.5/4 stars and said the film is too familiar and suspense-free. Susan G. Cole of Now rated it 2/5 stars and called it "all set-up and no payoff". Brad Wheeler of The Globe and Mail rated it 1/4 stars and described it as "a poker-based heist film that deals in clichés". The Los Angeles Times said the characters are "as overly familiar as they are under-developed".
