= I Declare War (film) =

- Theatrical release poster
- Directed by: Jason Lapeyre; Robert Wilson
- Written by: Jason Lapeyre
- Produced by: Patrick Cameron; Robert Wilson; Lewin Webb
- Starring: Siam Yu; Gage Munroe; Michael Friend
- Cinematography: Ray Dumas
- Edited by: Aaron Marshall
- Music by: Nick Dyer; Eric Cadesky
- Production company: Samaritan Entertainment
- Distributed by: Phase 4 Films; Drafthouse Films
- Release dates: September 9, 2012 (TIFF); May 10, 2013
- Running time: 93 minutes
- Country: Canada
- Language: English
- Box office: $14,928

I Declare War is a 2012 Canadian action comedy-drama film written and directed by Jason Lapeyre and co-directed by Robert Wilson. The film, about a group of friends who get together for a game of capture the flag that escalates into violence, was an Official Selection in the 2012 Toronto International Film Festival and was given a limited release in U.S. theatres on August 30, 2013.

== Plot ==
A neighborhood group of preteen friends play a game of capture the flag one Saturday afternoon in the local woods. However, their imaginations run wild, transforming their surroundings and equipment into a real warzone (sticks become rifles, slingshots become crossbows etc.) and before long, things get out of hand.

== Cast ==
- Siam Yu as Kwon
- Gage Munroe as P.K.
- Michael Friend as Skinner
- Aidan Gouveia as Quinn
- Mackenzie Munro as Jess
- Alex Cardillo as "Frost"
- Dyson Fyke as Sikorski
- Spencer Howes as "Joker"
- Andy Reid as Wesley
- Kolton Stewart as Caleb
- Richard Nguyen as Bak
- Eric Hanson as Kenney
- Alex Wall as Scott

== Production ==
Writer/director Jason Lapeyre wrote the script ten years earlier and based it on his childhood experiences of playing war with friends, saying "Almost everything that happens in this script is autobiographical or inspired by things that actually happened".

The script was picked up by producer Lewin Webb of Samaritan Entertainment and he forwarded it to his partner Robert Wilson, where it went through years of development and financial issues. Wilson was frustrated by the process the script was going through until he read through it and was reminded of what it was like to be the characters: "It was the experience I had growing up, the experience even Lewin had growing up, the experience Jason had growing up. There wasn’t much else to talk about or worry about at that point".

== Release ==
The film made its US premiere at ActionFest on April 15, 2012, winning Best Picture.

It made its Canadian premiere at the 2012 Toronto International Film Festival as its Official Selection on September 6, 2012. It then premiered at the Newport Beach International Film Festival on April 25, 2013. It was released in select theatres across Toronto on May 10, 2013. On May 20, 2013, it premiered at the Seattle International Film Festival.

It premiered at Fantastic Fest on September 23, 2012 and won the Audience Award on the next day.

== Reception ==
I Declare War received generally positive reviews from critics. Review aggregator website Rotten Tomatoes gives the film a 72% approval rating, based on 43 reviews with an average rating of 6.7/10. On Metacritic, it has a score of 58 out of 100, based on 17 reviews, indicating "mixed or average reviews".

In a dual review with Jason Buxton's Blackbird, Peter Howell of the Toronto Star gave it 2.5 out of 4 stars, criticizing the tone of the film saying "I want[ed] the filmmakers to pick a mood, any mood, and stick with it", but gave them praise for "assembling a great cast." Rick Groen of The Globe and Mail gave it 3 out of 4 stars, finding criticism in its meandering narrative, repetitious conceit and loose editing but found praise in the film "being buoyed by the naturalism of its exclusively young cast" and "effectively gets into your head and under your skin". Annlee Ellingson of the Los Angeles Times gave it 3 out of 5 stars, praising it for its charm and ending with "The performances may be slightly uneven across the cast of a dozen distinct personalities (plus a dog), but overall the effect works because, after all, they're just playacting … right?".
