= Zoie Palmer =

Canadian actress

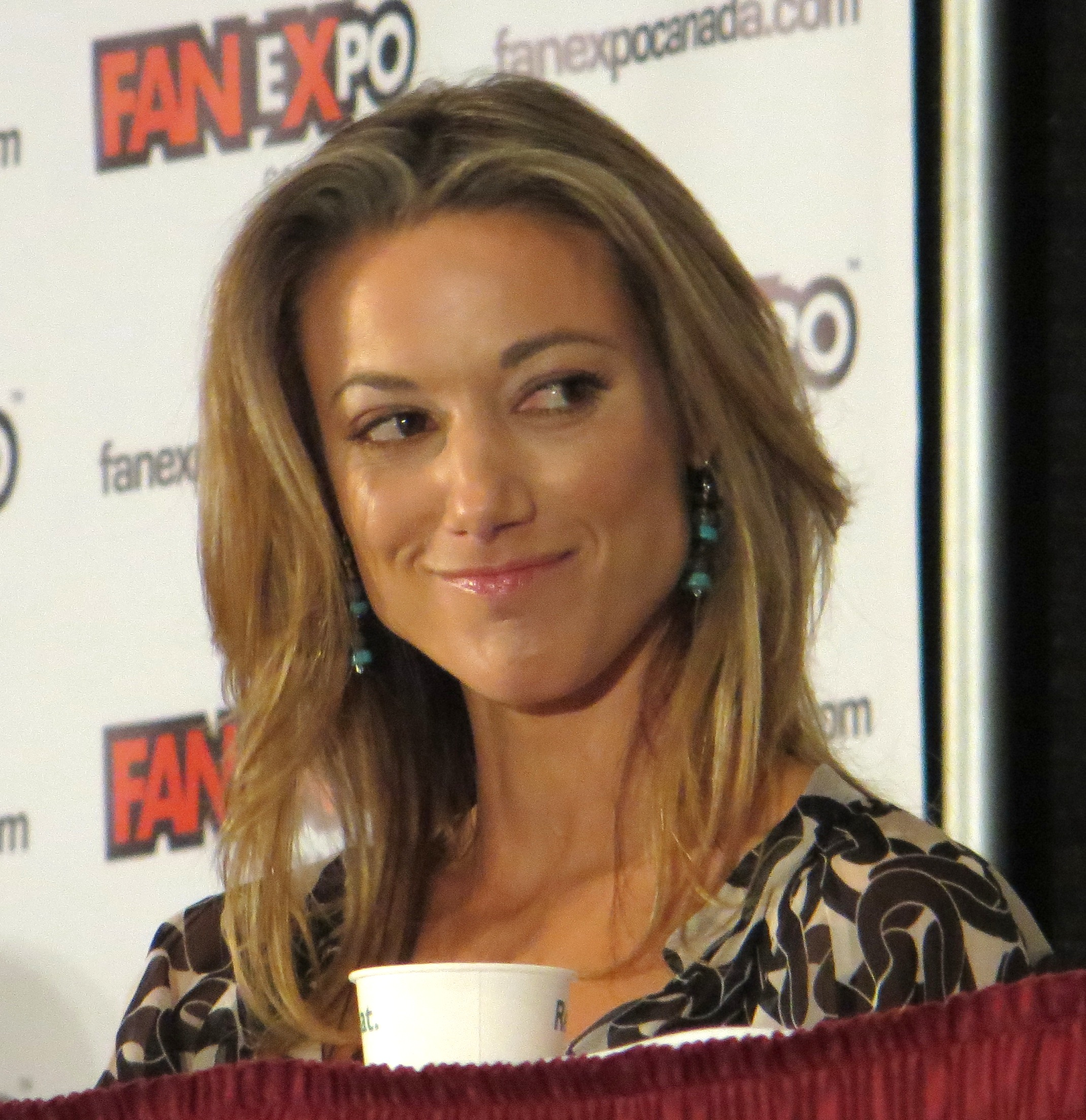
- Palmer at 2012 FanExpo Lost Girl panel
- Born: Camborne, United Kingdom
- Education: York University
- Occupation: Actor
- Years active: 2002 – present
- Known for: Lauren on Lost Girl

Zoie Palmer is a British-Canadian actress best known for her roles as Dr. Lauren Lewis in the supernatural drama Lost Girl and as the Android in the science fiction series Dark Matter.

== Early life ==
Palmer was born in Camborne in Cornwall, England, and emigrated to Canada when she was ten. She attended Sacred Heart Catholic High School in Newmarket, Ontario, and received a Bachelor of Fine Arts from York University in Toronto in 2001. She had her first professional acting role as a teenager, in summer stock at the Red Barn Theatre in Jackson's Point, Ontario.

== Career ==
Palmer's best-known role is that of Dr. Lauren Lewis, a major character in the Canadian series Lost Girl (2010–2015). Her television work includes made-for-TV movies The Reagans (2003) as Patti Reagan, Out of the Ashes (2003) as Didi Goldstein, and Devil's Perch (2005) as Abby. She had a recurring role in the CTV teen drama/comedy series Instant Star as rock singer Patsy Sewer (2006–2007), and was a co-lead in the Global drama The Guard as Coast Guard rescue specialist Carly Greig (2008–2009) (for which she had to conquer her fear of water). Her guest appearances include the "Girl's Best Friend" episode (2011) of The CW espionage drama Nikita as Anya Vimer, a terrorist who tries to sabotage a peace summit; the "Don of the Differently Abled" episode (2011) of the HBO Canada comedy Call Me Fitz as Laura, an unhinged amputee with plans for an escort service for disabled people; and "The Shooting" (2012), the third-season finale of the CTV fantasy drama The Listener as Staff Sgt. McCoy, an investigator for Internal Affairs. She appeared as Rebecca in the "1.1: Single Lesbian Psychos" episode (2009) of the online dating web series comedy Seeking Simone. After Lost Girl, she joined the main cast of science-fiction series Dark Matter as The Android (2015–2017) and hosted After Dark, the series' online aftershow for third-season episodes.

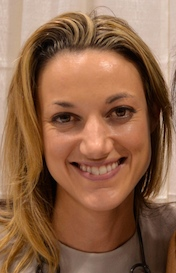
Palmer in 2011

Her film roles include Annabelle in the short drama Terminal Venus (2003), Haley in the romantic comedy The Untitled Work of Paul Shepard (2010), Cheryl in the supernatural horror Devil (2010), Officer Frances Jane in the crime thriller Cold Blooded (2012), Lou in the comedy Sex After Kids (2013), and Bethany in the fantasy adventure Patch Town (2014).

Palmer received the Best Actor award for Terminal Venus by the 2004 Baja Film Festival (Mexico); and the Gold Medallion Acting Award for Best Actress in a Feature Film for Cold Blooded by the 2012 Bare Bones International Film Festival. She was nominated in 2011 for the ACTRA Award for Outstanding Performance – Female for The Untitled Work of Paul Shepard, and in 2014 by the Canadian Comedy Awards for Multimedia / Best Female Performance in a Feature for Sex After Kids.

In 2013, she won "Favorite TV Actress" and "Best Tweeter" in the annual AfterEllen Visibility Awards for popularity, and "Best Sci-Fi or Fantasy Actress" by Canadagraphs in its annual Best Of TV Awards. She was chosen "Girl on Top 2013" by E! Entertainment Television in its popularity contest of Favorite TV Leading Ladies. She was named #1 in Hello! Canada's annual 50 Most Beautiful Stars issue celebrating homegrown talent in 2014. She received the Fan Choice Award for Favourite Canadian Screen Star by the 2014 Canadian Screen Awards.

Her character of Lauren and Anna Silk's character of Bo, a same-sex couple on Lost Girl, were named one of CNN's all-time "Favorite TV Couples" in 2013, and declared "Top TV Couple of 2013" in E! Entertainment Television's annual online contest.

== Social action ==
In 2018, Palmer was a campaign ambassador for the Women in Film & Television Toronto’s annual WIFT Stars fundraiser.

== Personal life ==
In 2014 she confirmed her relationship with Canadian film producer Alex Lalonde while thanking her and Luca, their son (Lalonde's biologically, born due to a prior relationship) when receiving an award from the Academy of Canadian Cinema and Television for her work on the show Lost Girl.

== Filmography ==
=== Film ===
Year	Title	Role	Notes
2003	Bar Life	Ryan	Short film
2003	Terminal Venus	Annabelle	Short film
2004	Godsend	Susan Pierce	
2006	Snapshots for Henry	Angie	Short film
2010	The Untitled Work of Paul Shepard	Haley	
2010	Devil	Cheryl	
2012	Cold Blooded	Officer Frances Jane	
2013	Sex After Kids	Lou	
2014	Patch Town	Bethany	
2017	Deerbrook	Tammy	Short film
2021	Spiral: From the Book of Saw	Kara Boswick	

=== Television ===
Year	Title	Role	Notes
2002	Odyssey 5	Researcher	Episode: "Skin"
2002	The Scream Team	Rebecca Kull	TV movie
2003	Adventure Inc.	Luisa	Episode: "Plaque Ship of Val Verde"
2003	Out of the Ashes	Didi Goldstein	TV movie
2003	The Reagans	Patti Reagan	TV movie
2004	Bliss	Donna	Episode: "Badness"
2004	Missing	Tracy Somers	Episode: "Mr. Nobody"
2004	Doc	Tracey Briant	Episode: "The Family Tree"
2005	Devil's Perch	Abby	TV movie
2005	Martha Behind Bars	Amy	TV movie
2006	Gospel of Deceit	Tracy Duggins	TV movie
2006–07	Instant Star	Patsy Sewer	Recurring role, 12 episodes
2008–09	The Guard	Carly Greig	Main role, 22 episodes
2009	Seeking Simone	Rebecca	Webisode 1.1: "Single Lesbian Psychos"
2010–15	Lost Girl	Dr. Lauren Lewis	Main role, 72 episodes additional roles: Reynard in "Original Skin" (2.09), Flora Blooms in "La Fae Époque" (4.07), Lola in "Follow the Yellow Trick Road" (5.14)
2010	Bloodletting & Miraculous Cures	Female Cop	Episode: "Unhappy Endings"
2010	Murdoch Mysteries	Katie Powers	Episode: "Victor, Victorian"
2011	Degrassi: The Next Generation	Officer	Episode: "Jesus, Etc.: Part 2"
2011	XIII: The Series	Moira	Episode: "The Irish Version"
2011	King	Angela Gilbert	Episode: "Lori Gilbert"
2011	Nikita	Anya Vimer	Episode: "Girl's Best Friend"
2011	Call Me Fitz	Laura	Episode: "Don of the Differently Abled"
2012	Lost Girl Finale Pre-Show	as self	Showcase TV special
2012	The Listener	Staff Sgt McCoy	Season 3, episode 13: "The Shooting"
2012	Flashpoint	Wife	Season 5, episode 11: "Fit For Duty"
2013	Lost Girl ConFAEdential	as self	Showcase TV special
2013	Her Husband's Betrayal	Tora	TV movie
2013	Lost Girl: An Evening at the Clubhouse	as self	Showcase TV special
2015–17	Dark Matter	The Android	Main role, 39 episodes. additional roles: Simulated Android in episodes 1.10, 1.12, 1.13, 2.03, 2.05, 2.10; Alternate Universe Android in episodes 2.08, 3.06; Dr. Irena Shaw in episode 3.10.
2016	Real Detective	Detective Leigh Maroni	Season 1, episode 5: "Retribution"
2017	After Dark	Host (as self)	Syfy International Dark Matter online after-show
2017	The Beaverton	Lisa Langenberg	Season 2, episode 2: "How will big pharma ruin legal weed for Canadians?" (sketch)
2018	Taken	Meg	Season 2, episode 5: "Absalom"
2018	Ransom	Jasmine Bradshaw	Season 2, episode 3: "Secrets and Spies"
2018	Wynonna Earp	Jolene	Season 3, episodes 4, 5: "No Cure For Crazy", "Jolene"
2019	Pure	Valerie Krochack	Season 2; recurring role, 6 episodes
2019-2021	Jann	Max	Main role, 22 episodes
2019	Hudson & Rex	Wendy Larson	Season 1, episode 12: "A Cult Education"
2020	Glass Houses	Anna Dawson	TV movie
2021	Wynonna Earp	Jolene	Season 4, episode 10: "Life Turned Her That Way"
2021	Private Eyes	Nicola Hawthorne	Season 5, episode 4: "Gone in 60 minutes"
2023	Pretty Hard Cases	Jenn	Season 3, episode 5, 8, 9 and 10: "Fish Called David," "Badge Bitch Party," "Right Hand Red," "Creatures of Habit"
2025	Murdoch Mysteries	Lucy Renshaw	Season 18, episode 11: "Bombshells"
