= Kate Trotter =

Canadian actress

- Born: February 5, 1953 (age 73); Toronto, Ontario, Canada
- Occupations: film, television and stage actress
- Spouse: Guy Sprung (divorced)

Kate Trotter (born February 5, 1953) is a Canadian film, television and stage actress.

== Career ==
Trotter has over 100 credits in film and television. She won a Gemini Award for Guest Actress in a Dramatic Series in 2003 for Blue Murder.

Her stage roles have included Miss Havisham in Great Expectations, Madge Kendal in The Elephant Man, Alma in Summer and Smoke, Juliet in Romeo and Juliet, Hermione in The Winter's Tale, Katie in Quiet in the Land and Ann Whitfield in Man and Superman. She is a three-time Dora Mavor Moore Award winner for her stage roles.

In addition to her own acting, Trotter has also taught acting at George Brown College and the Armstrong Studio, and works as a professional communication coach.

She also worked as a voice actress, providing her voice for Queen Nehelenia in the original English dub of the fourth season of the Sailor Moon anime in 2000.

== Personal life ==
She was married to theatre director Guy Sprung during the 1980s.

== Filmography ==
=== Film ===
Year	Title	Role	Notes
1980	Dirty Tricks	Sally	
1981	The Plouffe Family	Suzan Connely	
1981	Threshold	Mrs. Anderson	
1984	That's My Baby!	Karen	
1985	Joshua Then and Now	Jane Trimble	
1988	Martha, Ruth and Edie	Mrs. Peebles	
1989	The First Season	Alex Cauldwell	
2003	Beyond Borders	Mrs. Bauford	
2012	Upside Down	Becky	
2012	Two Hands to Mouth	Suzanne Baxter	
2013	Compulsion	Sylvia	
2013	Tru Love	Alice	
2015	Cold Deck	Audrey	
2016	Robin & Mark & Richard III	—N/a	Documentary
2019	The Silence	Lynn	
2022	Midnight at the Paradise	Charmaine	

=== Television ===
Year	Title	Role	Notes
1981	For the Record	Professor	Episode: "The Running Man"
1984	Kate Morris Vice President	Kate	Television film
1985	The Ray Bradbury Theater	Carol	Episode: "The Playground"
1985	Murder in Space	Pamela Cooper	Television film
1985	Night Heat	Megan Davis	Episode: "Secrets"
1985	The Suicide Murders	Myrna Yates	Television film
1986	Philip Marlowe, Private Eye	Irma Dean	Episode: "Pickup on Noon Street"
1987	A Conspiracy of Love	Judge	Television film
1987	Captain Power and the Soldiers of the Future	Vi	Episode: "Wardogs"
1987, 1993	Street Legal	Various roles	2 episodes
1988	Glory Enough for All	Edith Roach	Television film
1988	Alfred Hitchcock Presents	Margaret Lord	2 episodes
1988–1990	Friday the 13th: The Series	Various roles	4 episodes
1990	The Campbells	Abigail Marchant	Episode: "Bird of Paradise"
1990	Clarence	Rachel Logan	Television film
1990	E.N.G.	Karen Koestler	Episode: "Traitors All"
1991	Dracula: The Series	Margo Burton	Episode: "I Love Lucard"
1991	Beyond Reality	Marium	Episode: "Intimate Shadows"
1991	Alligator Pie	Teacher	Television film
1992	Material World	Marie	Episode: "The Road to Heaven"
1993	Romeo & Juliet	Lady Capulet	Television film
1993–1996	Kung Fu: The Legend Continues	Karen Simms	25 episodes
1994	Side Effects	Jennifer Mateo	Episode: "House of Caduceus"
1995	Due South	Nurse Unger	Episode: "A Hawk and a Handsaw"
1995	The Great Defender	Victoria	Episode: "Pilot"
1995	Bloodknot	Phyllis	Television film
1995	Family of Cops	Mrs. Novacek #1	Television film
1995	Strauss: The King of 3/4 Time	Klara	Television film
1996	TekWar	Dr. Allison Gilbert	Episode: "The Gate"
1996	Golden Will: The Silken Laumann Story	Mrs. Laumann	Television film
1996	Traders	Trudy Kelly	2 episodes
1997	Marie Curie: More Than Meets the Eye	Marie Curie	Television film
1998	Earth: Final Conflict	Dr. Park	3 episodes
1998	Exhibit A: Secrets of Forensic Science	Lilly Schmidt	Episode: "The Queen of Cons"
1999	Free Fall	Widow	Television film
2000	Psi Factor	Sandra	Episode: "Gone Fishing"
2001	Relic Hunter	Dr. Bette Ramer	Episode: "Eyes of Toklamanee"
2001	La Femme Nikita	Myra Mauk	Episode: "A Time for Every Purpose"
2002	You Belong to Me	Lois Clausen	Television film
2002	Monk	Kate Ashcombe	Episode: "Mr. Monk and the Psychic"
2002	Master Spy: The Robert Hanssen Story	Vivian Hanssen	Television film
2002	Sue Thomas: F.B.Eye	Carla Thomas	3 episodes
2003	Good Fences	Becka	Television film
2003	Jasper, Texas	Jamie Rowles	Television film
2003	Fallen Angel	Callie	Television film
2003, 2004	Blue Murder	Various roles	2 episodes
2003–2004	The Newsroom	George's Boss	4 episodes
2004	Soul Food	Mrs. Carter	Episode: "We Plan"
2004	Murdoch Mysteries	Donalda Rhodes	Episode: "Except the Dying"
2004	Lives of the Saints	Mrs. Amherst	Television film
2004	Plain Truth	Sarah Fitch	Television film
2004	Missing	Rasha Pashi	Episode: "Truth or Dare: Part 1"
2004	Anonymous Rex	Council Member #2	Television film
2004	An American Girl Holiday	Mrs. Vandergeld	Television film
2004	Paradise Falls	Anne Sutton	8 episodes
2004–2007	The Jane Show	Stella	27 episodes
2005	Puppets Who Kill	Julie	Episode: "Buttons the Dresser"
2005	Million Dollar Murder	Neighbor	Television film
2006	Cheaters' Club	Detective Rollins	Television film
2007	The Best Years	June Hamilton	Episode: "Guess Who's Coming to Dinner"
2007	Tell Me You Love Me	Lauren	3 episodes
2007	Across the River to Motor City	Mrs. Alicia Smith	Episode: "Treat Her Right"
2008	Murdoch Mysteries	Stella Smart	Episode: "Body Double"
2008	ReGenesis	Prosecutor	Episode: "The Truth"
2009	Taking a Chance on Love	Older Eve Miller	Television film
2009	Wild Roses	Nanna	4 episodes
2009	The Good Germany	Lucille Collins	Television film
2009	Unstable	Constance Cole	Television film
2009	Being Erica	Professor Audrey Hogan	Episode: "The Importance of Being Erica"
2010	When Love Is Not Enough: The Lois Wilson Story	Helen Griffiths	Television film
2010	Vacation with Derek	Felicia	Television film
2010–2012	Lost Girl	The Norn	5 episodes
2011	Republic of Doyle	Beth Miller	Episode: "Popeye Doyle"
2011	Little Mosque on the Prairie	Cassie McTavish	Episode: "Roomies"
2011	Against the Wall	Carolyn Randall	Episode: "We Protect Our Own"
2013–2014	Covert Affairs	Senator Claire Pierson	4 episodes
2015	Rogue	Mrs. Howard	Episode: "Oysters But No Pearls"
2016	Heartland	Evelyn	Episode: "Something to Prove"
2017	L.M. Montgomery's Anne of Green Gables	Mrs. Barry	Television film
2017	Anne of Green Gables: Fire and Dew	Mrs. Barry	Television film
2019	Good Witch	Jennifer Radford	2 episodes
2019	The Christmas Club	Barb	Television film
2020	Jann	Georgette	Episode: "Drop the Single"
2021	Toying with the Holidays	Kate Prescott	Television film
2022	Ruby and the Well	Principal Jane Donovan	Episode: "I Wish I Had Some Space"
