= Lie with Me (2005 film) =

2005 film by Clement Virgo

- Theatrical release poster
- Directed by: Clement Virgo
- Screenplay by: Tamara Faith Berger; Clément Virgo
- Based on: Lie with Me by Tamara Faith Berger
- Produced by: Damon D'Oliveira; Clément Virgo
- Starring: Lauren Lee Smith; Eric Balfour; Polly Shannon; Ron White; Kate Lynch; Don Francks; Kristin Lehman
- Cinematography: Barry Stone
- Edited by: Susan Maggi
- Music by: Byron Wong
- Production company: Conquering Lion Pictures
- Distributed by: ThinkFilm
- Release dates: September 10, 2005 (TIFF); November 11, 2005 (Canada)
- Running time: 93 minutes
- Country: Canada
- Language: English
- Budget: CAD 2,200,000 (estimated)

Lie with Me is a 2005 Canadian erotic drama film directed by Clement Virgo, based on the 2001 novel of the same name by Tamara Faith Berger. The film stars Lauren Lee Smith and Eric Balfour. Its plot concerns an outgoing, sexually aggressive young woman who meets and begins a torrid affair with an equally aggressive young man, which brings a strain on their personal lives. The film contains graphic, unsimulated sexual content.

The film was set and shot in Toronto, primarily The Annex. It premiered at the 2005 Toronto International Film Festival.

Included in the soundtrack is music by Broken Social Scene and Annelise Noronha.

== Plot ==
A young woman masturbates to a pornographic film. She gets up abruptly and goes out to a party, looking for sex. Leila has learned she has some power over men with sex but feels a part of her is still untouched, holding back, despite her assertiveness. Before she can choose a partner for the night, she is corralled by David, into a bathroom, while his girlfriend calls through the door. She leaves, but keeps her eye on David as she picks up a shy man, with whom she has sex against a fence outside as David watches from his car while his girlfriend, Victoria, fellates him. Leila is in complete control of her encounter while David remains completely passive.

He then sees her walking down the street and follows her. She smiles but does not speak to him and breaks into a run, leading him to a playground. They crouch inside a small tunnel and watch each other as she begins to touch herself. This time, however, he leaves.

Leila visits her parents and learns that her mother is leaving her father and selling her childhood home. Her father is devastated, staying stoned and refusing to do anything while her mother clears out the house. Leila's best friend, Rachel, is getting ready to be married, but confesses that she has had sex with an old boyfriend recently, despite her insistence that she loves her fiance and is ready to settle down. Leila is skeptical but supportive, and Rachel laughs when she turns on the VCR and discovers the porn tape Leila was watching; Leila tells her nothing about David.

When Leila sees David again, they finally speak to each other, and he takes her home, where they have sex. He asks Leila if she will go out with him on a real date, giving her his number when she leaves.

They finally do go out and begin a real romance. She meets his father, who is physically fragile but very funny, teasing her about having sex and making noise in their apartment. David cares very tenderly for his father, who is charmingly brusque. Leila is still skittish, although she is not intimidated when David's ex-girlfriend, Victoria, confronts her at her job, warning her that David has intimacy issues. When they go back to the club again, Leila dances suggestively with a couple of men while watching David's reaction, and he is hurt and angry when they return to his place. She brushes off his fears when he confesses that he thinks of nothing but her, that he needs her, but she acts like it is all a game. He begs to her to promise that she will not leave him, and she does, but does not believe it herself.

When David finds his father dead, he turns to Leila for consolation, but she does not know how to comfort him. This leads to conflict and ends with him asking her to leave. He later reconsiders, but he is unable to find Leila again, as he knows nothing about her except her first name. Leila finds her sexual experiences more and more unsatisfying and becomes increasingly frustrated. She picks up the shy man again, but strikes at him in anger when he is unable to follow her peremptory commands, and throws him out of her apartment in disgust.

Leila spends time with her parents as they go their separate ways and gets ready for the wedding while the summer is coming to an end. As she rides her bicycle to the ceremony, David sees her and follows in his truck. He waits outside the synagogue and approaches her as everyone floods out onto the sidewalk following the wedding, and then Rachel grabs Leila's hand and she calls out to David, to ask if he is coming. At the reception, David watches Leila dance with an old man, but she runs away again when he approaches her. This time he follows her all the way home, and all the way inside, telling her he will not leave her again. They reunite and the two engage in a passionate kiss.

== Cast ==
- Lauren Lee Smith as Leila
- Eric Balfour as David
- Polly Shannon as Victoria
- Mayko Nguyen as Kika
- Michael Facciolo as Shy Guy
- Kate Lynch as Marla
- Ron White as Ben
- Kristin Lehman as Rachel
- Don Francks as Joshua
- Richard Chevolleau as Vigorous
- Frank Chiesurin as Joel
- Nicola Lipman as Rabbi
- Theresa Tova as Russian Wedding Singer
- John Paul Buccat as the Hooker

Lauren Lee Smith said that when she got a call from her agent on the requirements for the role of Leila, which clearly included not only nudity but on-camera live sex, she thought he was kidding. Then she read the script and recognized its origins. Clement Virgo asked her to audition with Eric Balfour, whom he'd interviewed in Los Angeles. Virgo got them into a room to see the chemistry between them because he knew that without chemistry they had no movie. "There was apparently chemistry," Smith later affirmed, giving a giddy laugh.

== Reception ==
Lie with Me received a 50% "Rotten" rating on Rotten Tomatoes. Writing for Variety, Leslie Felperin says that "Barry Stone's lensing, favoring a soft, Northern-climes afternoon light for the sex scenes in particular, looks dreamy throughout", but that "with its drawn-out last act and sentimental ending, [this] pic is a long way from being the Gen-Y Last Tango in Paris it would like to think it is."

Ron Mashate, writing for Stylus Magazine, concurred in part:

Similar to Virgo's well-received Rude (1995), Lie with Me is about capturing a distinctive mood. In a 2005 interview with Now, Virgo explains his intentions with respect to the later film: 'When I read the book, it wasn't about the story, it was about this feeling that the book conjured up in me, this kind of visceral, raw energy, that was like what I felt when I first fell in love, that sexual aspect of falling in love. That was the challenge of it for me, to take a plot-driven narrative and capture an emotion.' It’s certainly the case that Virgo skimped on the narrative in favor of the mood. At times, the film comes off inert and aimless, absent of an apparent conflict. The Bee Hives [album] version of [the song] 'Lover’s Spit' asserts itself, representing Virgo’s telos: sinuousness, elegiac, inaccessible. And if Woody Allen writes love letters to New York, Virgo is attempting the epistolary equivalent with Toronto.
