= Lawrence Hill =

Canadian novelist, essayist, and memoirist (born 1957)

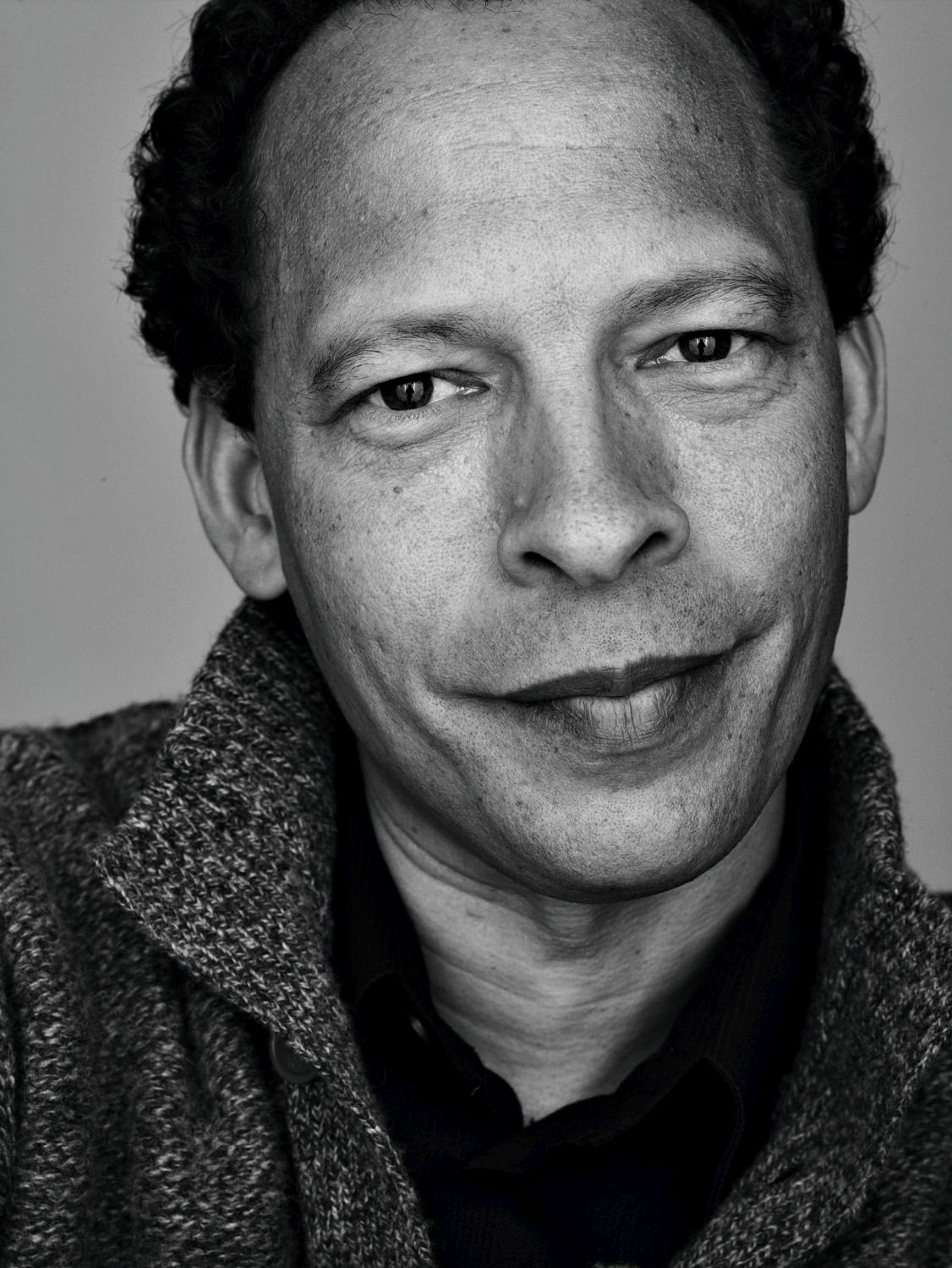
- Hill in 2009
- Born: January 24, 1957 (age 69); Newmarket, Ontario
- Education: Universite Laval (BA); Johns Hopkins University (MA)
- Occupations: Novelist, non-fiction writer
- Writing career
- Period: 1990s–present
- Notable works: Black Berry, Sweet Juice, The Book of Negroes

Lawrence Hill (born January 24, 1957) is a Canadian novelist, essayist, and memoirist. He is known for his 2007 novel The Book of Negroes, inspired by the Black Loyalists given freedom and resettled in Nova Scotia by the British after the American Revolutionary War, and his 2001 memoir Black Berry, Sweet Juice: On Being Black and White in Canada. The Book of Negroes was adapted for a TV mini-series produced in 2015. He was selected in 2013 for the Massey Lectures: he drew from his non-fiction book Blood: The Stuff of Life, published that year. His ten books include other non-fiction and fictional works, and some have been translated into other languages and published in numerous other countries.

Hill was born in Newmarket, Ontario, to an American couple who had immigrated to Toronto from Washington, D.C., in 1953. His father was black and his mother was white. Hill served as chair of the jury for the 2016 Scotiabank Giller Prize.

== Personal life and education ==
Hill was born in 1957 in Newmarket, Ontario, the second son of Daniel G. and Donna Mae (Bender) Hill, an interracial American couple who had married in 1953 and settled in Toronto, where his father was completing his doctorate in sociology at the University of Toronto. His father, a sociologist, civil servant and activist, later became the first director and chairperson of the Ontario Human Rights Commission. Daniel Hill also served as the Ombudsman of Ontario. He published a still seminal work about Black history in Canada: The Freedom Seekers: Blacks in Early Canada.

Hill's mother, Donna Mae Bender, came from a white Republican family in Oak Park, Illinois, and graduated from Oberlin College. She met his father in Washington, D.C., where she worked for a Democratic US Senator and became a civil rights activist. In the early 1950s in Toronto, Donna Hill worked as a human rights activist for the city's Labor Committee for Human Rights. She lobbied the Ontario government to enact anti-discrimination legislation. She also wrote about Black Canadian history; her A Black Man's Toronto, 1914-1980: The Reminiscences of Harry Gairey (1980) was published by the Multicultural History Society of Ontario.

Daniel and Donna Hill co-founded The Ontario Black History Society with Wilson O. Brooks and other friends. Lawrence Hill was born as the second son, and grew up with his brother Dan and sister Karen in the predominantly white Toronto suburb of Don Mills. Dan Hill became a singer-songwriter and writer, and their sister, the late Karen Hill (1958-2014), was also a writer. Her novel, short stories, poems and an essay are still to be published.

Hill's paternal grandfather and great grandfather were university-educated, ordained ministers of the African Methodist Episcopal Church. It was founded in Philadelphia, Pennsylvania in 1816 as the first independent black denomination in the United States.

After attending the University of Toronto Schools, Hill earned a B.A in economics from Laval University in Quebec City. He moved temporarily to the United States to earn an M.A. in writing from Johns Hopkins University in Baltimore, Maryland.

Lawrence Hill presently lives with his second wife, the writer Miranda Hill, in Hamilton, Ontario, and in Woody Point, Newfoundland. He has four daughters and a son. He has lived and worked in Baltimore, Maryland; Spain, and France.

== Career ==
Hill taught undergraduate fiction writing while completing his M.A. at Johns Hopkins. Since completing that program, he returned to Canada, where he has taught creative writing or mentored creative writers in numerous adult education programs. These have included The Becoming Ground program at the University of British Columbia, the Humber School for Writers, Sage Hill Writing Experience, and The Banff Centre.

Hill has also served numerous times on juries granting literary awards or writing grants. He has frequently spoken at academic and social conferences, literary festivals, libraries, universities and high schools across Canada, the United States, Mexico, Europe, South America, South Africa, the Caribbean and Australia.

He is a Senior Fellow at Massey College at the University of Toronto. As of September 2016, Hill is affiliated with the University of Guelph.

== Writing career ==
Hill's first passion was running, but he was unable to realize his dreams of becoming an elite athlete and winning an Olympic gold medal in the 5,000 meters. He threw himself into writing in his teenage years and completed his first story at the early age of 14. After receiving his B.A. in economics at Laval University, Hill worked for four years as a full-time newspaper reporter for The Globe and Mail, and later for The Winnipeg Free Press.

He became the parliamentary bureau chief for the newspaper in Ottawa, covering Parliament, the Supreme Court of Canada and a wide range of cultural, economic and social issues. Resigning from his position as parliamentary bureau chief in 1986, Hill moved to Spain to begin writing fiction full-time.

The work of his parents in the human rights movement and Black history greatly influenced Hill's work related to identity and belonging as a writer. Hill curated and wrote the exhibit on his father for the Ontario Archives, called The Freedom Seeker: The Life and Times of Daniel G. Hill.

Hill's nonfiction books include Trials and Triumphs: The Story of African-Canadians (1993), Women of Vision: The Story of the Canadian Negro Women's Association (1996), his memoir Black Berry, Sweet Juice: On Being Black and White in Canada (2001), The Deserter's Tale: The Story of An Ordinary Soldier Who Walked Away from the War in Iraq (2007), Dear Sir, I Intend to Burn Your Book: An Anatomy of a Book Burning (2013), and Blood: The Stuff of Life (2013).

Hill's fictional works include Some Great Thing (1992), Any Known Blood (1997),The Book of Negroes (2007), and The Illegal (2015), which brought his work to broad public attention and won numerous awards.

Published in at least ten countries, The Book of Negroes won several awards, including the Rogers Writers' Trust Fiction Prize, both CBC Radio's Canada Reads and Radio-Canada's Le Combat des livres, and the Commonwealth Writers' Prize for Best Book. The novel has been chosen by community or academic reading programs as a central work for discussion at Dalhousie University (twice), Trent University, the Calgary Public Library, The City of Rothesay (NB), the Hamilton Public Library and the One Book One Community program linking Kitchener, Waterloo and Cambridge, Ontario.

The Book of Negroes was adapted as a six-part television miniseries. Hill co-wrote it with director Clement Virgo. The series featured actors Aunjanue Ellis, Cuba Gooding, Jr., and Louis Gossett Jr. Filmed in South Africa, Nova Scotia, and Ontario in early 2014, the miniseries premiered in Cannes, Toronto and New York City in the fall of 2014, began to air on CBC Television in Canada in January 2015, and was scheduled to air on BET in the US in February 2015.

Although Hill's novel The Book of Negroes was first released in 2007 by W. W. Norton & Company under the title Someone Knows My Name; the American publisher re-issued a new edition of the novel with the original title in January 2015 to build on the mini-series. BET has committed to releasing the TV miniseries in the US as The Book of Negroes. HarperCollins Australia published this novel as Someone Knows My Name in Australia and New Zealand.

Hill's short fiction has been featured in the literary quarterlies Descant and Exile, as well as in Canadian newspapers and magazines such as The Toronto Star and Toronto Life. The Walrus published Hill's award-winning essay "Is Africa's Pain Black America's Burden", and a short story entitled "Meet You at the Door". Its January–February 2015 issue featured Hill's essay on the creative process of adapting The Book of Negroes for the TV mini-series.

Hill served as a writer in residence with the Toronto District School Board from 2011 to 2013, visiting some twenty schools to discuss the art and business of writing with students.

Hill was selected in 2013 as CBC Massey Lecturer. In the fall of that year he delivered lectures in five Canadian cities, drawn from his non-fiction book Blood: the Stuff of Life (2013). Also aired on CBC Radio, Blood: The Stuff of Life is a personal consideration of the physical, social, cultural and psychological aspects of blood, how it defines, unites and divides us. In 2015, Blood: The Stuff of Life won the Hamilton Literary Award for Non Fiction.

He was named a Member of the Order of Canada in 2015.

His newest novel, The Illegal, was published in fall 2015. The novel has already been optioned for film treatment by Conquering Lion Pictures, the producers of the Book of Negroes miniseries. The Illegal won the 2016 edition of Canada Reads, making Hill the first writer ever to win the competition twice.

== Translations ==
French translations have been published by Les Éditions de la Pleine Lune in Montreal, Quebec.

- Aminata (from The Book of Negroes), translated by Carole Noel, 2011. It was also published in French by Presence Africaine in Paris.
- Un grand destin (from Some Great Thing), translated by Robert Paquin, 2012.
- Le sang: essence de la vie (from Blood: The Stuff of Life), translated by Carole Noel, 2014.

Aminata became a bestseller in Quebec, where it won Le combat des livres on Radio-Canada. It was also published by Présence Africaine in Paris, France, where it was shortlisted, in 2013, for the Prix Fetkann.

The Book of Negroes has been published in translation in Dutch, Norwegian, German and Hebrew.

== Activism ==
Deeply passionate about the advancement of women and girls in Africa, Hill has worked as a volunteer in the West African countries of Niger, Cameroon and Mali since 1979. His first published work of fiction, a short story entitled "My Side of the Fence," recounted the transformative experience of working in Niger with Crossroads International. As an honorary patron of Crossroads, in 2010 Hill founded the Aminata Fund, supporting programs for women and girls in developing areas of Africa. He returned in 2014 as a Crossroads volunteer in Swaziland.

In 2007, Hill collaborated with Joshua Key, a former US-Army private, to write Key's memoir of serving with the US Army in the Iraq War in 2004. Key deserted the army and sought refugee status in Canada in 2005. The Deserter's Tale: the Story of an Ordinary Soldier Who Walked Away from the War in Iraq was published by House of Anansi Press in Canada. the United States (Grove Atlantic) It has been translated and published in more than ten other languages or countries.

Hill has been on the advisory council of Book Clubs for Inmates since 2010. He has also been a member of the Council of Patrons of the Black Loyalist Heritage Society, in Birchtown, Nova Scotia, since 2011. Hill is an honorary patron of Project Bookmark Canada since 2012. He is a member of PEN Canada and an active member of the Writers' Union of Canada, for which he has chaired and sat on various committees and served on the National Council.

== Awards and honours ==
=== Academic awards and honours ===
- Doctor of Laws (honoris causa), The University of Western Ontario, 2017
- Doctor of Letters (honoris causa), McMaster University, 2016
- Doctor of Laws (honoris causa), Dalhousie University, 2014
- Associate Senior Fellow, Massey College, University of Toronto, 2014
- Medal of Distinction (honoris causa), Huron University College, 2012
- Doctor of Letters (honoris causa), Waterloo University, 2011
- Doctor of Laws (honoris causa), Wilfrid Laurier University, 2010
- Doctor of Letters (honoris causa), University of Toronto, 2010

=== Literary awards and honours ===
- Winner, Hamilton Literary Award, Blood: The Stuff of Life, 2015
- Winner, Radio-Canada Le combat des livres, Aminata, 2013
- Shortlist, Prix Fetkann (France), Aminata, 2013
- Winner, CBC Radio's Canada Reads, The Book of Negroes, 2009
- Winner, Commonwealth Writers' Prize, The Book of Negroes, 2008
- Winner, The Rogers Writers' Trust Fiction Prize, The Book of Negroes, 2008
- Longlist, IMPAC Award, The Book of Negroes, 2008
- Finalist, Hurston/Wright Legacy Award, Someone Knows My Name, 2008
- Winner, National Magazine Award (Essay) Is Africa's Pain Black America's Burden?, 2006

=== Community awards ===
- Queen Elizabeth II Diamond Jubilee Medal, 2012
- Freedom to Read Award from the Writers' Union of Canada, 2012
- Rev. John C. Holland Award of Merit, Hamilton Black History Committee, 2012
- Canadian Civil Liberties Association Award of Excellence, 2012
- Bob Edwards Award from the Alberta Theatre Projects, 2010
- Renaissance Award from Planet Africa, 2010
- Inducted into Canada's Walk of Fame, 2015.

== Works ==
=== Fiction ===
- Some Great Thing (Winnipeg: Turnstone Press, 1992)
- Any Known Blood (Canada, Toronto: HarperCollins, 1997; William Morrow, New York, 1999)
- The Book of Negroes (Toronto: HarperCollins, 2007); published as Someone Knows My Name (New York: W.W. Norton & Co., 2007 and Sydney: HarperCollins Australia, 2009)
- The Illegal (2015)
- Beatrice and Croc Harry (2022)

=== Non-fiction ===
- Trials and Triumphs: The Story of African-Canadians (Toronto: Umbrella Press, 1993)
- Women of Vision: The Story of the Canadian Negro Women's Association (Toronto: Umbrella Press, 1996)
- Black Berry, Sweet Juice: On Being Black and White in Canada (Toronto: HarperCollins Canada, 2001)
- The Deserter's Tale: The Story of an Ordinary Soldier Who Walked Away from the War in Iraq, with Joshua Key (New York: Atlantic Monthly Press, 2007; Toronto: House of Anansi Press, 2007; Melbourne: Text Publishing Co., 2007)
- Dear Sir, I Intend to Burn Your Book: An Anatomy of a Book Burning (Edmonton: University of Alberta Press, 2013)
- Blood: The Stuff of Life (Toronto: House of Anansi Press, 2013)

=== Television ===
- The Book of Negroes: a six-part television miniseries (co-written with director Clement Virgo), Conquering Lion Pictures, 2015

=== Film ===
- Seeking Salvation: A History of the Black Church in Canada, Travesty Productions, Toronto, 2004 (winner of 2005 American Wilbur Award for best national television documentary)

== Other sources ==
- "How The Book of Negroes, a profound yet unknown Canadian story, became a miniseries", The Globe and Mail, January 3, 2015
- "Chains Unearthed", Literary Review of Canada, May 2014
- "Dad will always 'live within' us", The Toronto Star, July 6, 2003
