= The Illegal (novel) =

2015 novel by Lawrence Hill

- First edition cover
- Author: Lawrence Hill
- Language: English
- Genre: Fiction
- Publisher: HarperCollins
- Publication date: 2015
- Publication place: Canada
- Media type: Print
- Pages: 400
- ISBN: 9781554683833

The Illegal is a novel by Canadian writer Lawrence Hill. It was published in 2015 by Harper-Collins.

== Synopsis ==
The novel's central character is Keita Ali, a marathon runner from the fictional Indian Ocean nation of Zantoroland. The story follows Ali as he desperately tries to save his only sibling, who has been kidnapped.

== Critical response ==
The novel won the 2016 edition of Canada Reads, making Hill the first writer to win the competition twice. Prior to its publication, the novel was optioned for film treatment by Conquering Lion Pictures, the producers of the miniseries adaptation of Hill's prior novel The Book of Negroes.

The French translation Le Sans-papiers, by Carole Noël and Marianne Noël-Allen, was shortlisted for the Governor General's Award for English to French translation at the 2017 Governor General's Awards.
