= Richard Chevolleau =

Jamaican-Canadian actor

- Born: October, 1966; Kingston, Jamaica
- Occupation: Actor
- Years active: 1989–present
- Honours: Gemini Award; ACTRA Award

Richard Chevolleau (born October, 1966) is a Jamaican–Canadian actor, known for playing Augur on Earth: Final Conflict from 1997 to 2002.

== Early life and education ==
Chevolleau was born in Kingston, Jamaica, and raised in Toronto. After completing high school, he studied the Meisner Technique of acting with Paul Bardier.

== Career ==
He began his career in the late 1980s with guest parts in the television series My Secret Identity and Friday the 13th: The Series, before having his first major starring role in the 1989 television film Pray for Me, Paul Henderson.

In 1994 he had a starring role in the television series Boogies Diner. In 1995 he starred in Clement Virgo's film Rude. He also starred in Virgo's 1997 film The Planet of Junior Brown.

He has played roles in the television series Street Time (2002–03), 'Da Kink in My Hair (2004), This Is Wonderland (2005), Lost Girl (2011), She's the Mayor (2011), Saving Hope (2012), Hannibal (2013), Blood and Water (2015), Killjoys (2019), Hudson & Rex (2011–22) and Murdoch Mysteries (2021).

In films, Chevolleau has appeared Lulu (1996), The Wrong Guy (1997), Narc (2002), Lie with Me (2005), Four Brothers (2005), Talk to Me (2007), The Gospel According to the Blues (2010), and Home Again (2012).

Chevolleau also performs on stage. He played as Cory in a production of August Wilson's Fences for Theatre Calgary and the National Arts Centre.

In 2004, he had a guest appearance in the CTV series The Eleventh Hour as Gilbert Brown, a prison inmate who had been victimized by a brutal gang rape. He won the Gemini Award for Best Performance by an Actor in a Guest Role in a Dramatic Series at the 19th Gemini Awards in 2004, and the ACTRA Award for Best Actor in 2005.

== Filmography ==
=== Film ===
Richard Chevolleau film credits
Year	Title	Role	Notes	Ref.
1993	Indian Summer	Sam Grover		
1993	Save My Lost Nigga Soul		Short film	
1994	Silent Witness: What a Child Saw (Blood Brothers)	Sylvester "Sly" Crawford		
1995	Rude	Jordan		
1996	Lulu			
1997	The Wrong Guy	Jimmy		
1999	The Planet of Junior Brown	Duckie		
2000	No Alibi	Paul, Police Officer		
2001	Who Is Cletis Tout?	Detective Horst		
2001	True Blue	Toots		
2002	Narc	Latroy Steeds		
2005	Four Brothers	El Camino Guy		
2005	Lie with Me	Vigorous		
2007	Talk to Me	Poochi Braxton		
2013	Home Again	Jammix		

=== Television ===
Richard Chevolleau television credits
Year	Title	Role	Notes	Ref.
1989	My Secret Identity	Unknown	1 episode	
1989	Friday the 13th: The Series	Scott Grant	1 episode	
1989	Pray for Me, Paul Henderson	Russell	Episode of C.B.C.'s Magic Hour	
1993	Survive the Night	Hitchhiker	TV movie	
1997	Counterstrike	Sugar Duke	Episode: "The Contender"	
1994	Boogies Diner	Tim		
1994	TekWar	Wildside	TV movie	
1994	TekWar: TekLords	Wild Side	TV movie	
1994	Tales from the Cryptkeeper	Eric (voice)	1 episode	
1994	X-Rated	Flex Roy	TV movie	
1995	The Possession of Michael D.	David	TV movie	
1996	New York Undercover	Adam Rashad	1 episode	
1996	Mistrial	Willy Sandoval	TV movie	
1997–2002	Earth: Final Conflict	Marcus "Augur" Deveraux	Regular cast (70 episodes)	
1998	Dogboys	Willi B	TV movie	
1998	The Wall	Timothy Mullen	TV movie. Segment: "The Pencil Holder"	
1998	Thanks of a Grateful Nation	Tater	TV movie	
1998, 1999	Due South	Stanley Smith / Davie Abelard	2 episodes	
2000	Flowers for Algernon	Unknown	TV movie	
2000	Out of Sync	Skeesix	TV movie	
2000	Soul Food	Franco Van Adams	3 episodes	
2001	Bojangles	Young Militant	TV movie	
2001	A Glimpse of Hell	Dolan	TV movie	
2002	Recipe for Murder	Otis Johnson	TV movie	
2002	Monk	Willis	1 episode	
2003	Chasing Cain II: Face	Syl	TV movie	
2003	Open House	Mark Quinton	TV movie	
2003	Veritas: The Quest	Costa	1 episode	
2002–2003	Street Time	Clarence "Adonis" Barnes	5 episodes	
2004	The Eleventh Hour (Bury the Lead)	Gilbert Brown	1 episode	
2005	Murder in the Hamptons (Million Dollar Murder)	Suffolk Country Police Detective	TV movie	
2005	This Is Wonderland	Wayne Smith	3 episodes	
2005	Swarmed	Q	TV movie	
2008	'Da Kink in My Hair	Patrick	1 episode	
2010	The Gospel According to the Blues	Gideon	TV movie	
2011	Flashpoint	Thomas Arvedson	1 episode	
2011	Lost Girl	Officer Boyd	1 episode	
2011	She's the Mayor	Reg Smith	6 episodes	
2012	Saving Hope	Bernie	1 episode	
2013	Hannibal	Detective Pascal	1 episode	
2014–2015	Rookie Blue	Commissioner Alonso Santana	5 episodes	
2015	Blood and Water	Detective Banks	1 episode	
2016	The Perfect Stalker	Detective Charles	TV movie	
2019	Killjoys	Tattoo-Face-Guy	4 episodes	
2019–2022	Hudson & Rex	David Mason	4 episodes	
2021	Murdoch Mysteries	Charlie Pinsky	1 episode	
