= Karolyn Smardz Frost =

Canadian historian

Karolyn Smardz Frost is a Canadian historian who won the Governor General's Award for English-language non-fiction in 2007 for I’ve Got a Home in Glory Land: A Lost Tale of the Underground Railroad.

Smardz Frost is a historian, archaeologist, and professor of history. She has a bachelor's degree in Archaeology, a master's degree in Classical Studies and a PhD in Canadian History. She was one of the founders of Toronto's Archaeological Resource Centre which provides archaeological education to school children.

In 1985, Smardz Frost excavated the home of Thornton and Lucie Blackburn and later told their story in I’ve Got a Home in Glory Land: A Lost Tale of the Underground Railroad.

Her 2017 book Steal Away Home was nominated for the Atlantic Book Award for Scholarly Writing in 2018, and adapted by screenwriter Tamara Faith Berger and director Clement Virgo for the 2025 drama film Steal Away.

== Works ==
- The underground railroad: next stop, Toronto! (2003) with Adrienne L Shadd and Afua Cooper
- I've got a home in glory land: a lost tale of the underground railroad (2007)
- Steal Away Home (2017)
