= Daniel G. Hill =

American-Canadian sociologist

- Born: Daniel Grafton Hill III; November 23, 1923; Independence, Missouri
- Died: June 26, 2003 (aged 79)

Daniel Grafton Hill III OC OOnt (November 23, 1923 – June 26, 2003) was an American-Canadian sociologist, civil servant, human rights specialist, and Black Canadian historian.

An American born in Missouri and raised in the western United States, Hill went to Canada for graduate work in sociology at University of Toronto, and decided to settle there. He and his American wife both became Canadian citizens and their three children were born and raised there.

== Early life and education ==
Daniel Grafton Hill III was born November 23, 1923 in Independence, Missouri. He grew up in the western United States as the son of May Edwards Hill and Daniel Grafton Hill II. He had three sisters, Margaret, Doris and Jeanne. His father, born in Washington, DC, and paternal grandfather were both university-educated men who became ordained ministers of the African Methodist Episcopal Church. It was the first independent black denomination in the United States, founded in 1816 in Philadelphia, Pennsylvania.

One of Hill's paternal aunts was Violet Hill Whyte, the first of his father's nine siblings. She was a public school teacher before 1937, when she was the first black person to be appointed as an officer in the Baltimore Police Department in Maryland.

Hill served in the American army during the Second World War. In 1948, Hill graduated with a BA from Howard University, a historically black university in Washington, DC. While in the capital, he met his future wife, Donna Mae Bender (1928–2018), a white former Senate staffer and civil rights activist from Oak Park, Illinois.

== Canada ==
In 1950, he moved to Canada to study sociology at the University of Toronto. He received an M.A. in 1951 and a Ph.D in 1960, writing his thesis on Negroes in Toronto: A Sociological Study of a Minority Group. Already teaching at the university, he and his wife decided to make their home in Toronto. They had three children together, all born in Canada: singer-songwriter Dan Hill, author Lawrence Hill, and poet and novelist Karen Hill (1958–2014).

In the early 1950s in Toronto, Donna Hill worked as a human rights activist for the city's Labour Committee for Human Rights. She lobbied the Ontario government to enact anti-discrimination legislation. She also wrote about Black Canadian history; her A Black Man's Toronto, 1914–1980: The Reminiscences of Harry Gairey (1980) was published by the Multicultural History Society of Ontario.

== Career ==
From 1955 to 1958, Hill was a researcher for the Social Planning Council of Metropolitan Toronto. From 1958 to 1960, he was Executive Secretary of the North York Social Planning Council. In 1960, he was the assistant director of the Alcoholism and Drug Addiction Research Foundation. From 1961 to 1962, he taught in the department of sociology at the University of Toronto.

In 1962, he was the first full-time director of the Ontario Human Rights Commission. In 1972, he became Ontario Human Rights Commissioner. In 1973, he resigned to found his own human rights consulting firm. From 1984 to 1989, he was the Ontario Ombudsman.

Hill co-founded the Ontario Black History Society with his wife Donna and other friends. He explained that they founded the Ontario Black History Society "because Black children from the islands, from the United States, from Africa have been told that they have no heritage here. They will relate to it (the exhibit) because they will know that their Black ancestors who came from Africa and who came to Canada and the United States did indeed contribute to the life and to the community and to the building of this country.” In 1981, he published the book, The Freedom Seekers: Blacks in Early Canada.

In 1993, he was awarded the Order of Ontario. In 1999, he was made an Officer of the Order of Canada.

== Works ==
- Human Rights in Canada: A Focus on Racism (1977, 1986)
- The Freedom Seekers: Blacks in Early Canada (1981)
