= Chaz Thorne =

Canadian actor and director

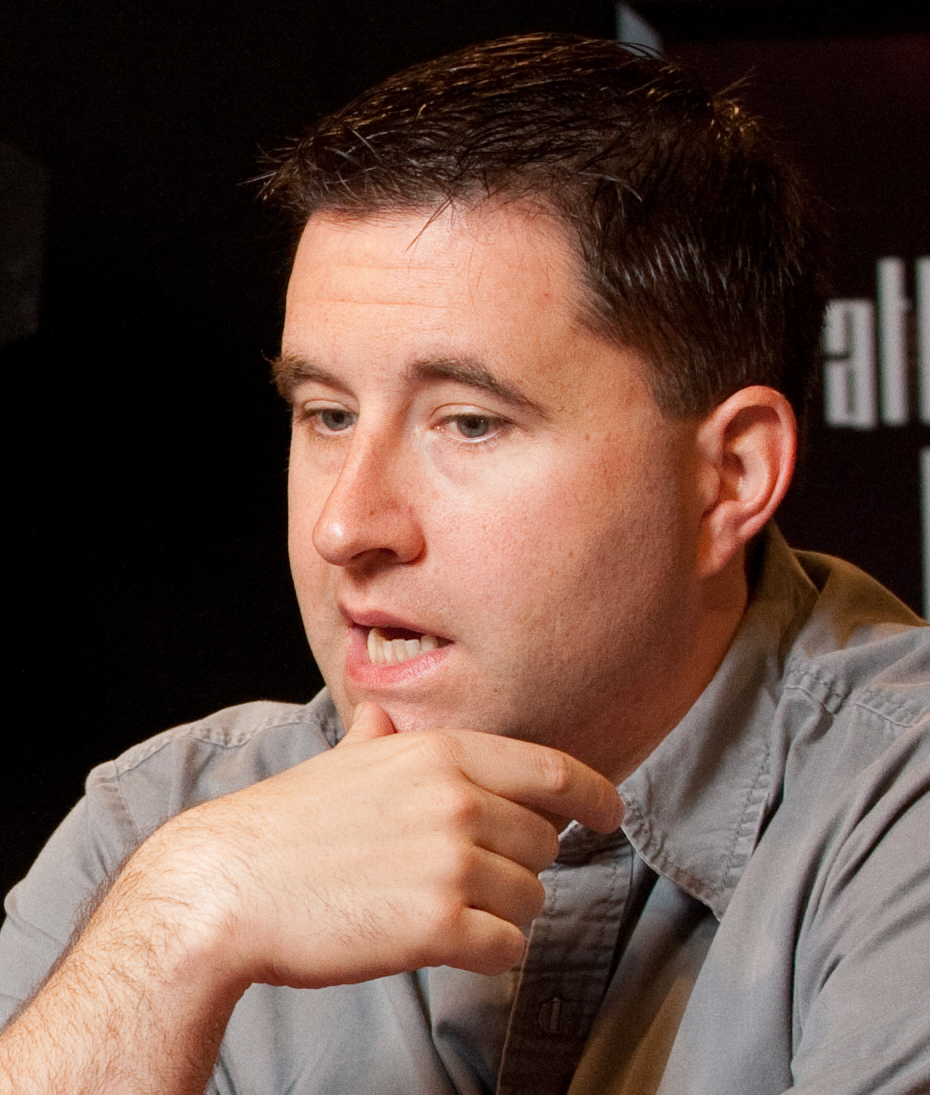
- Chaz Thorne on the set of the Eastlink TV show "Atlantic Filmmakers" during the 2010 Atlantic Film Festival in Halifax
- Born: 1975 (age 50–51); Bridgewater, Nova Scotia
- Occupations: Film director, actor, screenwriter

Chaz Thorne (born 1975 in Bridgewater, Nova Scotia) is a Canadian actor and television and film director. He graduated from the National Theatre School in 1996. He has appeared on stages across Canada as well as in numerous film and television projects, including The Event and Lucky Girl. Thorne founded Toronto's Jack in the Black Theatre in 1996.

His first film projects as writer and director were two half-hour comedies for CBC television: Table Dancer and One Hit Wonder. His first feature film screenplay was produced in 2006 as Poor Boy's Game, co-written and directed by Clément Virgo and starring Danny Glover. The horror film Just Buried was Thorne's directorial film debut. His film, Whirlygig, was featured in the Atlantic Film Festival in Halifax, Nova Scotia.
