= Steal Away (film) =

2025 Canadian thriller film

- Theatrical release poster
- Directed by: Clement Virgo
- Written by: Tamara Faith Berger
- Based on: Steal Away Home by Karolyn Smardz Frost
- Produced by: Clement Virgo; Damon D'Oliveira; Peter De Maegd; Tom Hameeuw
- Starring: Angourie Rice; Mallori Johnson
- Cinematography: Sophie Winqvist
- Edited by: Jorge Weisz
- Production companies: Conquering Lion Pictures; Potemkino
- Distributed by: Elevation Pictures
- Release dates: September 5, 2025 (TIFF); July 17, 2026 (Canada)
- Running time: 114 minutes
- Countries: Canada; Belgium
- Languages: English; French; Lingala

Steal Away is a 2025 drama film, directed by Clement Virgo. Adapted from Karolyn Smardz Frost's non-fiction book Steal Away Home, the film stars Angourie Rice as Fanny, a naive teenager in a purposely ambiguous country, has her illusions about the world shattered when she forms an intense bond with Cécile (Mallori Johnson), a refugee taken in by her family.

The cast also includes Lauren Lee Smith, Idrissa Sanogo, Arnold Pinnock, Hilde Van Mieghem, Nola Elvis Kemper, Denise M'Baye, Gloria Mampuya and Isabelle Menal in supporting roles.

== Cast ==
- Angourie Rice as Fanny
- Mallori Johnson as Cecile
- Lauren Lee Smith as Florence
- Idrissa Sanogo as Rufus
- Arnold Pinnock as Washington
- Hilde Van Mieghem as Rose
- Nola Elvis Kemper as Alberta
- Denise M'Baye as Abigail
- Gloria Mampuya as Muna
- Isabelle Menal as Mary

== Production ==
The film was shot in Belgium in 2024.

== Release ==
The film premiered at the Toronto International Film Festival on September 5, 2025. The film was released in Canada on July 17, 2026.

== Critical response ==
On the review aggregator website Rotten Tomatoes, 85% of 20 critics' reviews are positive, with an average rating of 6.5/10.

For That Shelf, Victor Stiff wrote that "with Steal Away, Virgo adds another visionary work to his acclaimed ouvré. Powered by two commanding lead performances and realized through striking worldbuilding and production design, it delivers an intimate yet radical coming-of-age story. Timeless, tender, and soul-shaking, the film further cements Virgo as one of Canada’s most dynamic talents and critically vital voices."

== See also ==
- List of Afrofuturist films
