= Lucy DeCoutere =

Canadian actress and air force officer

Major Lucy DeCoutere
- Born: 5 September 1970 (age 56); Edmonton, Alberta, Canada
- Education: Concordia University; Griffith University
- Occupation: Actress
- Military career
- Allegiance: Canada
- Branch: Royal Canadian Air Force
- Rank: Major

Lucy DeCoutere (born 5 September 1970) is a Canadian actress and Royal Canadian Air Force officer, best known for her role as the character Lucy in the television series Trailer Park Boys.

== Life and career ==
DeCoutere grew up as the youngest child of four of British and Czech parents. She attended grad school at Concordia University in Montreal and has held various jobs, including a kindergarten teacher in South Korea, and attended teachers college at Griffith University in Australia.

DeCoutere has performed in The Vagina Monologues. She is a female voice on the computer game Empress of the Deep - The Darkest Secret.

DeCoutere is a Major in the Royal Canadian Air Force, presently based in Ontario. As of 2013, she was a Training Development Officer.

On April 2, 2016, DeCoutere announced via Twitter that she was resigning from Trailer Park Boys after actor and co-star Mike Smith was arrested on suspicion of misdemeanor domestic battery. Also on April 2, 2016, it was revealed by the Trailer Park Boys' publicist, Sheila Roberts, that DeCoutere had informed the show's producers a few weeks before Smith's arrest that she would not be returning for the show's next season. Statements released from the Trailer Park Boys production team indicated that the incident was misreported and that the call to the police was made by persons who had not witnessed the event. The woman was described by Smith as a friend, and she issued a statement that "at no time did [she] feel in danger" and that the incident was "perceived as something other than what it was." The charges against Smith were dropped due to a lack of evidence.

== Jian Ghomeshi ==
In October 2014, DeCoutere joined seven anonymous women in publicly alleging sexual assault by former CBC Radio personality Jian Ghomeshi; she was the first to publicly identify herself. Ghomeshi was charged with sexual assault and choking, but was acquitted of all charges at the trial involving DeCoutere, with the judge expressing doubt of the witnesses' testimonies.

== Filmography ==
- Trailer Park Boys: Don't Legalize It (2014) ... as Lucy
- The Gospel According to the Blues (2009) ... as Social Worker
- Trailer Park Boys: Countdown to Liquor Day (2009) ... as Lucy
- Trailer Park Boys: The Movie (2006) ... as Lucy
- Anniversary Present (2006) ... as Bridesmaid 2
- Trailer Park Boys Christmas Special (2004) ... as Lucy
- Shattered City: The Halifax Explosion (2003) ... as Woman #1 at Rally
- The Event (2003) ... as Jody, Upstairs Neighbour
- Trailer Park Boys (2001–2008, 2014–2016) ... as Lucy
- Beefcake (1998) ... as Champ's Wife
- The Hanging Garden (1997) ... as Bridesmaid
