= The Gospel According to the Blues =

- Written by: Thom Fitzgerald
- Directed by: Thom Fitzgerald
- Starring: Jackie Richardson; Richard Chevolleau; Karen Robinson
- Music by: Warren Robert
- Country of origin: Canada
- Original language: English

Production
- Cinematography: Tom Harting; Becky Parsons
- Editors: Thom Fitzgerald; Susan Shanks
- Running time: 45 minutes
- Production company: Emotion Pictures

Original release
- Network: VisionTV
- Release: June 1, 2010

The Gospel According to the Blues is a Canadian television drama film, directed by Thom Fitzgerald and released in 2010. Adapted from George Boyd's stage play Gideon's Blues, the film stars Jackie Richardson as Momma-Lou Steele, a woman advocating for change in her community after her son Gideon (Richard Chevolleau), a college graduate struggling to find stable employment, becomes drawn into the local illegal drug trade.

The film also stars Karen Robinson as Gideon's wife Cherlene, as well as Cory Bowles, Lucy DeCoutere and John Dunsworth in supporting roles.

The film premiered June 1, 2010 on Vision TV.

== Cast ==
- Jackie Richardson as Momma-Lou Steele
- Richard Chevolleau as Gideon Steele
- Karen Robinson as Cherlene Steele
- Cory Bowles as Amos
- Lucy DeCoutere as a social worker
- John Dunsworth as a manager

== Awards ==
Richardson won the Gemini Award for Best Performance by an Actress in a Leading Role in a Dramatic Program or Mini-Series at the 26th Gemini Awards, and Robinson was nominated for Best Performance by an Actress in a Featured Supporting Role in a Dramatic Program or Mini-Series.
