= Is God Is (film) =

2026 film by Aleshea Harris

- Theatrical release poster
- Directed by: Aleshea Harris
- Written by: Aleshea Harris
- Based on: Is God Is by Aleshea Harris
- Produced by: Riva Marker; Aleshea Harris; Janicza Bravo; Tessa Thompson; Kishori Rajan
- Starring: Kara Young; Mallori Johnson; Janelle Monáe; Erika Alexander; Mykelti Williamson; Josiah Cross; Vivica A. Fox; Sterling K. Brown
- Cinematography: Alexander Dynan
- Edited by: Jay Rabinowitz
- Music by: Joseph Shirley
- Production companies: Orion Pictures; Viva Maude; Linden Entertainment
- Distributed by: Amazon MGM Studios
- Release date: May 15, 2026
- Running time: 100 minutes
- Country: United States
- Language: English
- Budget: $14.8 million
- Box office: $4.9 million

Is God Is is a 2026 American Southern Gothic revenge dark comedy thriller film written, produced and directed by Aleshea Harris in her feature directorial debut, and starring Kara Young, Mallori Johnson, Janelle Monáe, Vivica A. Fox, and Sterling K. Brown. Based on Harris's 2018 play, the film focuses on twin sisters who set out on a quest for revenge against their father for disfiguring them as children.

The film was released in theatres on May 15, 2026, by Orion Pictures. It was praised by critics for its style and direction, but underperformed at the box office, grossing $4.9 million on a $14.8 million budget.

== Plot ==
Twin sisters Racine and Anaia have been left disfigured in a fire started by their father when they were children; Racine's entire left arm is scarred, while Anaia's injuries are mostly on her face and chest. Racine receives a letter from their mother, who they thought died in the fire. They drive cross-country to meet their mother, whom Racine refers to as "God", on her deathbed. God admits that she relinquished the twins to foster care to prevent further traumatizing them, and reveals that their father, against whom she had a restraining order, broke into their house and choked her unconscious in the bathroom before bringing the twins in and setting her ablaze in front of them; the two acquired their injuries while trying to help her. She then requests that they kill their father so she can know peace before she dies. When the twins hesitate, her aides pull back her sheets, revealing the extent of her injuries, which persuades Racine.

Following God's instructions, the twins find Divine, a woman their father had a tryst with after his trial. They meet Divine's son Ezekiel and learn that their father left a pregnant Divine shortly after he was acquitted, and that Divine has been waiting for his return ever since. Racine derides her for waiting so long for an abusive man who abandoned her, leading an offended Divine to eject them; before they leave, Racine steals an address book that belonged to their father.

Using the book, they travel to the office of their father's lawyer, Chuck Hall. Communicating via whiteboard, Chuck urges them to abandon their quest, but when Racine refuses, Chuck reveals that their father ripped out Chuck's tongue to prevent Chuck from warning others about him. He then tells them their father has twin sons, and directs them to his new family.

As they stop off the side of the road, a helmeted motorcyclist destroys their car engine with a hammer before pursuing them into an abandoned construction site. The twins eventually subdue him and realize it is Ezekiel, trying to save his father. With their car damaged, the twins travel to their father's house via bus.

The twins accost his current wife Angie, whom he also abuses, as she is attempting to flee to Las Vegas before their father returns. Angie turns from sympathetic to scornful when the twins refuse to let her leave, ultimately spitting in Racine's face, leading Racine to beat her to death. A horrified Anaia begs Racine to not kill anyone else besides their father. At their father's house, his sons Riley and Scotch assume the girls are strippers sent by their father for their approaching birthday. The girls play into this to gain access to the house; as they dress up, Anaia reveals that she is pregnant by an older man she met online. When they perform for the boys, Scotch insults Anaia's facial deformities. Racine seduces him before cutting his throat. As Anaia attempts to bond with Riley, Scotch stumbles out and bleeds to death. Anaia stops Racine from killing Riley before fleeing with him. Outside, Riley begins to choke Anaia in retaliation for his brother. Racine intervenes, and the ensuing fight culminates in Anaia stabbing him with hedge clippers and pushing him into the pool as he strangles Racine. Hearing their father return home, Anaia drags the unconscious Racine inside and attempts to hide.

Their father finds Anaia and informs her that their mother grabbed them after he set her alight, leading to their injuries, and promises he would never harm his children. He persuades Anaia to discard her weapon before assaulting her. Anaia prepares to fight him as a recovered Racine attacks him from behind. The twins pursue him into a bathroom, push him into the tub, pour liquor on him, and set him ablaze. As they turn to leave, he grabs Racine and pulls her into the fire with him, killing her.

Anaia mourns her sister in front of the ruins of the house until the next morning, before discarding her weapon and returning home, vowing to tell her baby about Racine and their journey.

== Cast ==
- Kara Young as Racine, the outspoken and angrier twin sister who suffered burns to her left arm
- Mallori Johnson as Anaia, the quiet and compassionate twin sister who was facially burned
- Vivica A. Fox as Ruby, the twin sisters' mother, referred by them as "God"
- Sterling K. Brown as the man, the twin sisters' father
- Janelle Monáe as Angie, the man's new wife
- Mykelti Williamson as Chuck Hall, the man's former defense attorney
- Erika Alexander as Divine, a church leader in love with the man
- Xavier Mills as Scotch, the outgoing twin brother
- Justen Ross as Riley, the reserved twin brother
- Josiah Cross as Ezekiel, the son of Divine and the man

== Production ==
In October 2024, it was announced that principal photography began on a film adaptation of Is God Is and that Kara Young, Mallori Johnson, Sterling K. Brown, Vivica A. Fox and Janelle Monáe were cast in the film. The project was previously set up at A24 with Scott Rudin producing and A24 financing and distributing in September 2018.

In January 2025, it was announced that Brown had completed his work on the film and that filming had wrapped.

=== Music ===
The film's soundtrack is by Moses Sumney and Joseph Shirley. It features elements of American blues, rock, and experimental sound. "Sins Of The Father", featuring Kara Jackson, was released as a single from the soundtrack on May 18, 2026. The soundtrack was released on May 22, 2026. The soundtrack was Sumney's debut film score. The score took "a little over a year" to develop.

== Release ==
The film was released theatrically on May 15, 2026.

== Reception ==
=== Box office ===
In the United States and Canada, Is God Is was released alongside Obsession and In the Grey, and was projected to gross around $3 million from 1,510 theaters in its opening weekend. It went on to debut to $2.2 million, finishing tenth at the box office.

=== Critical response ===
On the review aggregator website Rotten Tomatoes, 97% of 125 critics' reviews are positive, with an average rating of 8.0/10. The website's consensus reads: "Stylistically freewheeling and fueled by righteous fury, Is God Is is a blistering revenge thriller executed with superb directorial confidence by Aleshea Harris." Metacritic, which uses a weighted average, assigned the film a score of 83 out of 100, based on 22 critics, indicating "universal acclaim". Audiences surveyed by CinemaScore gave the film an average grade of "B+" on an A+ to F scale.

Anzhe Zhang of Slant Magazine awarded the film three stars out of four. Guy Lodge of Variety gave the film a positive review and wrote, "Both wildly entertaining and viciously upsetting, this remarkable debut boldly reaps what others have sown." William Bibbiani of TheWrap also gave the film a positive review, calling it "so emotionally, dramatically, philosophically complex that it's tempting to put on professorial airs and focus entirely on its depth. But it is also, just as importantly, electrifying to watch." Some compared the film to the work of Quentin Tarantino.

=== Accolades ===
Award	Date of ceremony	Category	Nominee(s)	Result	Ref.
Gotham Independent Film Awards	November 30, 2026	Best Adapted Screenplay	Aleshea Harris	Pending	
