= Rude (film) =

1995 film

- Directed by: Clement Virgo
- Written by: Clement Virgo
- Produced by: Clement Virgo; Damon D'Oliveira; Karen King
- Starring: Maurice Dean Wint; Rachael Crawford; Richard Chevolleau; Clark Johnson
- Narrated by: Sharon Lewis
- Cinematography: Barry Stone
- Edited by: Susan Maggi
- Release date: May 1995
- Running time: 89 minutes
- Country: Canada
- Language: English

Rude is a 1995 Canadian crime film directed by Clement Virgo in his feature-length directorial debut. It was screened in the Un Certain Regard section at the 1995 Cannes Film Festival, before having its Canadian premiere at the 1995 Toronto International Film Festival as the opening film of the Perspectives Canada program.

== Plot ==
Set in Toronto, Ontario, the film tells three distinct but interrelated stories about Black Canadian life in the impoverished Regent Park neighbourhood of the city. One focuses on "The General" (Maurice Dean Wint), a drug dealer trying to rebuild his life with the help of his brother Reece (Clark Johnson) after being released from prison; one centres on Jordan (Richard Chevolleau), an amateur boxer who is convinced to take part in a gay-bashing which forces him to finally confront his own repressed homosexuality; the third centres on Maxine (Rachael Crawford), a woman who has recently been dumped by her longtime boyfriend after having an abortion. All three stories are tied together by the voice of Rude (Sharon Lewis), a disc jockey for a pirate radio station in the neighbourhood.

== Cast ==
- Maurice Dean Wint - General
- Rachael Crawford - Maxine
- Clark Johnson - Reece
- Richard Chevolleau - Jordan
- Sharon Lewis - Rude (as Sharon M. Lewis)
- Melanie Nicholls-King - Jessica
- Stephen Shellen - Yankee
- Gordon Michael Woolvett - Ricky
- Dayo Ade - Mike
- Dean Marshall - Joe
- Ashley Brown - Johnny
- Andy Marshall - Addict
- Junior Williams - Curtis

== Production ==
Rude is the first feature film created by the filmmaking duo Clement Virgo and Damon D'Oliveira after they met and conceived the concept of the film at a Canadian Film Centre residency in 1991. Produced by Conquering Lion Pictures with the assistance of the Canadian Film Centre, Rude was the first Canadian dramatic feature to be written, produced, and directed by an all-black team. It was hailed, along with Soul Survivor, as ushering in a new Black Canadian film aesthetic.

== Awards ==
At TIFF, the film received an honorable mention from the jury for the Best Canadian Film award.

The film received eight Genie Award nominations at the 16th Genie Awards in 1996, for Best Picture, Best Director (Virgo), Best Supporting Actor (Johnson), Best Supporting Actress (Crawford), Best Screenplay (Virgo), Best Cinematography (Barry Stone), Best Editing (Susan Maggi) and Best Original Score (Aaron Davis and John Lang).

== Restoration ==
In 2017 the film was digitally restored by Technicolor, Toronto and Montreal, under the supervision of Virgo and producer Damon D'Oliveira. The restored version screened in the Cinematheque section of the 2017 Toronto International Film Festival.
