= William P. Lawson =

Commissioner of the Baltimore Police Department from 1937 to 1938

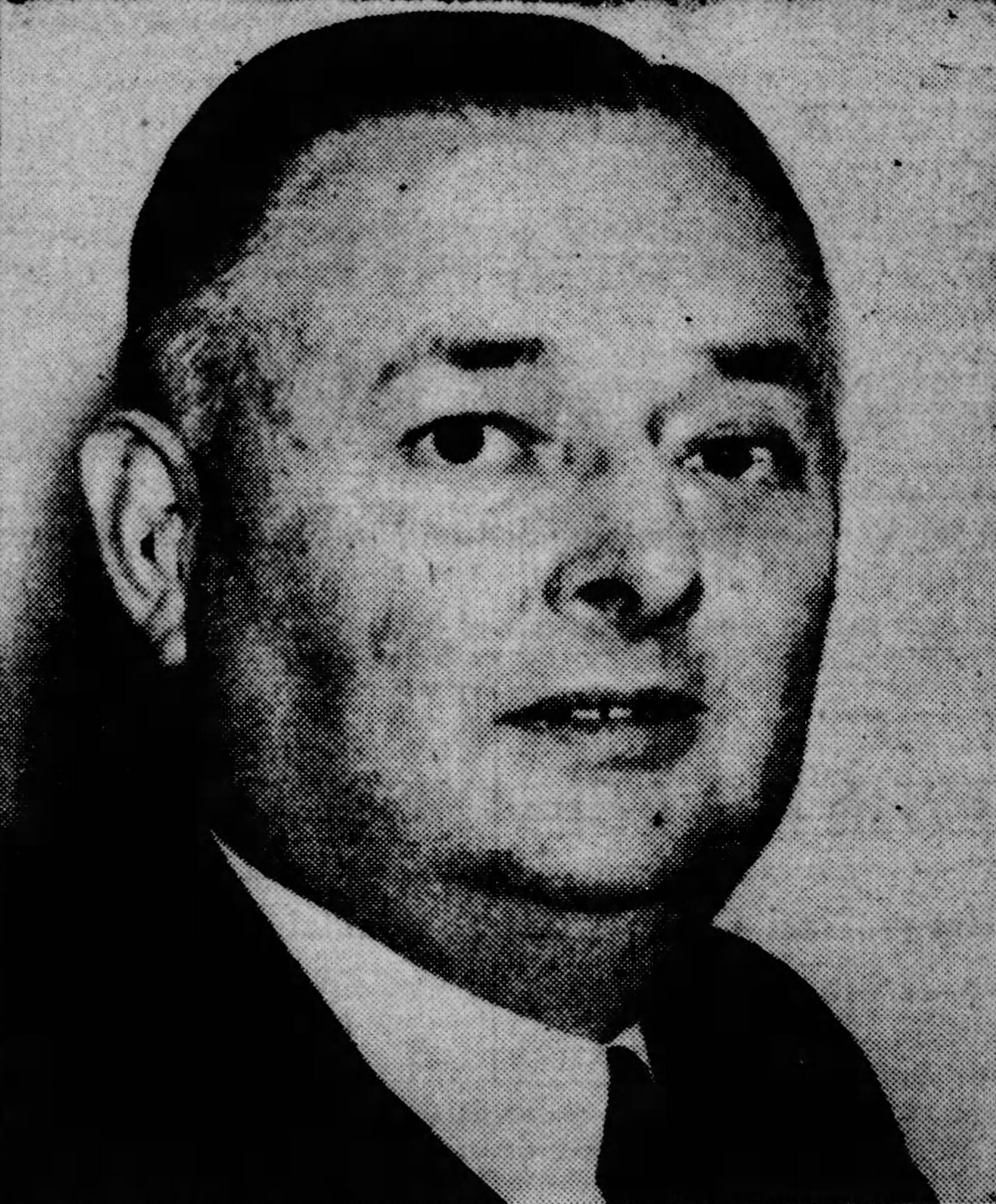
- Lawson, c. 1938

Commissioner of the Baltimore Police Department
- In office May 17, 1937 – July 31, 1938
- Appointed by: Harry Nice
- Preceded by: Charles D. Gaither
- Succeeded by: Stephen G. Nelson (acting)

Personal details
- Born: 1879 or 1880
- Died: July 2, 1946 (aged 66); Baltimore, Maryland
- Political party: Republican

William P. Lawson (1879 or 1880 – July 2, 1946) was an American investment banker and politician who served as commissioner of the Baltimore Police Department (BPD) from 1937 to 1938. Prior to serving as commissioner, Lawson was the chairman of the Central Committee of the Maryland Republican Party. Appointed by governor of Maryland Harry Nice to replace Charles D. Gaither, Lawson's tenure included the appointment of Violet Hill Whyte, the first African-American BPD officer, and four further African-American officers.

In June 1938, a credit report showed that Lawson held at least 1,000 shares in the Consolidated Distillers Corporation, a business dealing in whisky. While he initially refused to comment, he later claimed he was simply a stockbroker for the company and was not involved in liqour, contradicting the credit report and a company statement. Calls rose for Nice to ask Lawson to resign, citing his liqour dealings and raising crime rates, which Nice refused. On July 30, 1938, the Securities and Exchange Commission alleged his brokerage firm, William P. Lawson and Co., of fraud. Although he maintained his innocence, he temporarily resigned the next day, stating that his business dealings "[have] no connection whatsoever with the affairs of the Police Department or my duties as commissioner." Lawson was found guilty and sentenced to three years in prison, which was partially pardoned by governor Herbert O'Conor. Lawson died of a heart attack in Baltimore on July 2, 1946, at the age of 66.

== Biography ==
Lawson was born in 1879 or 1880. He worked as an investment banker, going on to serve as chairman of the Central Committee of the Maryland Republican Party. He married a former Republican National Committeewoman from Maryland and died of a heart attack in Baltimore on July 2, 1946, at the age of 66.

== Commissioner of the Baltimore Police Department ==
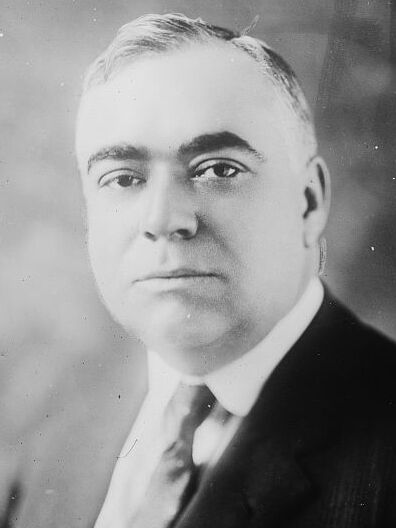
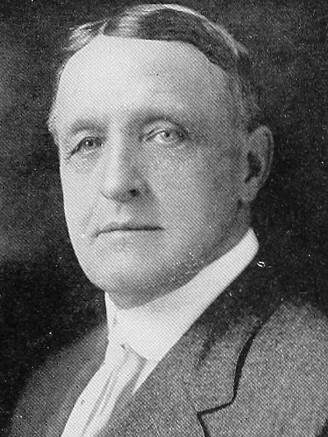
Governor of Maryland Harry Nice appointed Lawson to succeed Charles D. Gaither.

Lawson was appointed by Governor of Maryland Harry Nice as commissioner of the Baltimore Police Department on May 17, 1937, replacing outgoing commissioner Charles D. Gaither.

While commissioner, Lawson was credited with appointing the first African-American person, Violet Hill Whyte, to the department; he appointed 4 further African-American officers seven months later.

=== Liquor and fraud investigations ===
My Dear Governor Nice:
As you are aware, the Securities and Exchange Commission has filed a petition against me in the United States District Court for the District of Maryland asking that I be restrained from further continuing my personal business because of certain practices which they claim are in violation of the Securities and Exchange Act. I am convinced that this is a vicious attempt to injure me. It is, however, entirely a personal matter and has no connection whatsoever with the affairs of the Police Department or my duties as commissioner.[...]Therefore, I feel it will be in the best interest of your administration and the conduct of the affairs of the department that, pending the disposition of the proceedings in the United States District Court, that I temporarily relinquish my duties as commissioner.

— Letter from Lawson to Nice announcing his temporary resignation

In June 1938, a credit report revealed that Lawson had been involved with the Consolidated Distillers Corporation, a business dealing in whisky, where he served as its spokesman, owning at least 1,000 shares in the company. When asked for comment, Lawson and Nice refused, while the corporation claimed that Lawson no longer had stock or connections to the company. In a later statement, Lawson explained that he had served as a stockbroker for the company, not making any more profit than his commissions. He further claimed that he had never been involved in liquor and did not plan to be, an explanation that Nice found sufficient. Inconsistencies were pointed out, including that the credit report claimed that Lawson was interested in the company's affairs, acting as a supervisor. The company also stated that Lawson had worked there but "just left". Calls rose for Nice to ask that Lawson resign due to his dealings in the liquor industry and increasing crime rates.

On July 30, 1938, the Securities and Exchange Commission (SEC) filed a petition against Lawson, accusing his brokerage firm, William P. Lawson and Co., of at least six illegal practices, relating to selling securities of its customers without their consent as collateral for personal loans, while continuing to pay dividends to obscure that they had been sold, as well as having over 2,000% of its net capital in debt. SEC investigator Augustus A. Eggolt estimated that the firm had US$162,912.89 ($2.77 million in 2023) in debt to its customers while it only had roughly US$1,733 ($29,430 in 2023) in its bank account. A "show-cause" order, signed by judge William Calvin Chesnut, required Lawson to formally respond to the petition in front of the United States District Court for the District of Maryland by August 15.

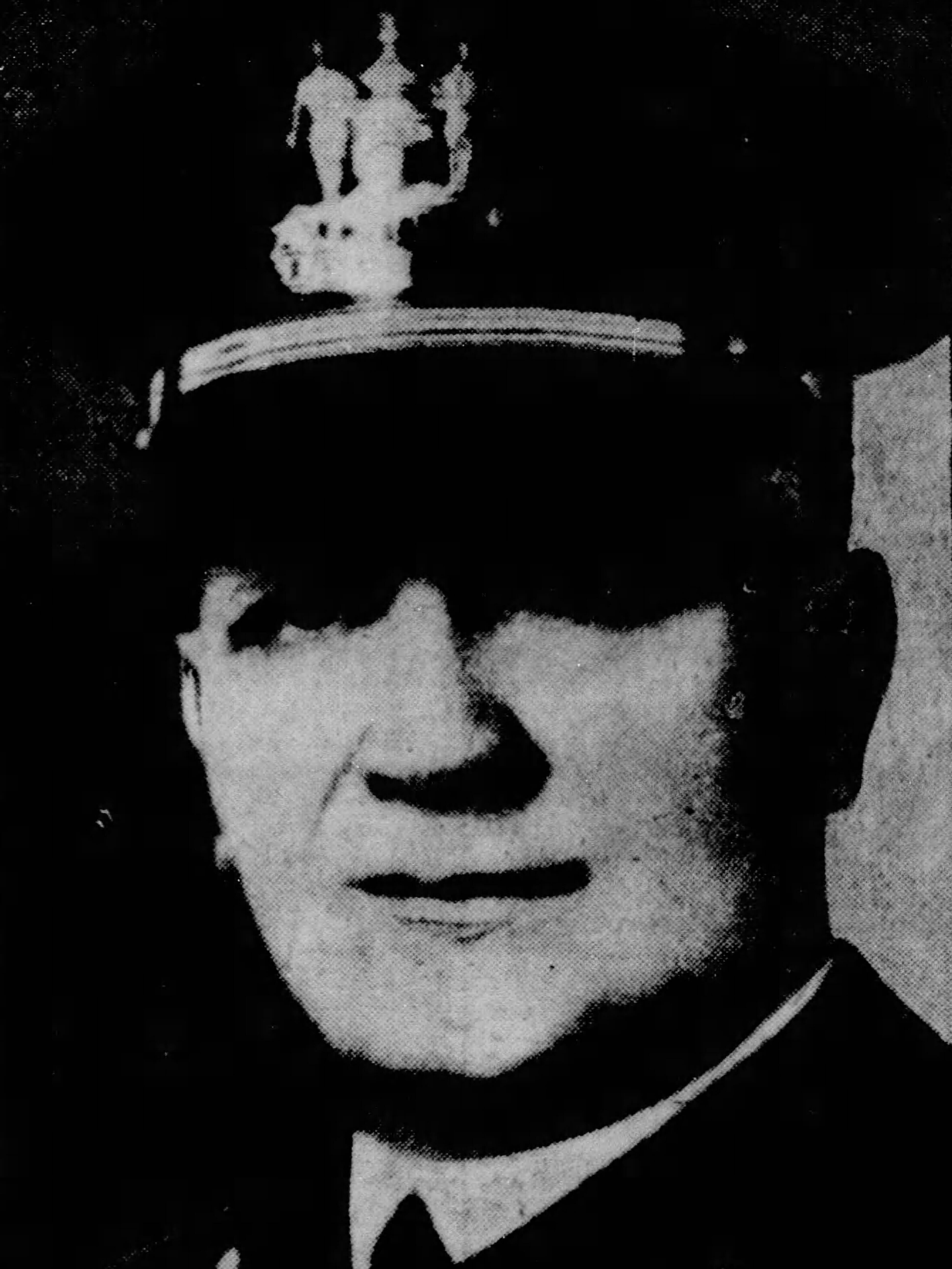
Stephen G. Nelson succeeded Lawson as acting commissioner

After the order, Lawson announced his temporary resignation as commissioner to Nice on July 31, 1938, which he immediately accepted, appointing chief inspector Stephen G. Nelson as acting commissioner. Although Nice described Lawson's resignation as wise, he declined to comment further on the case, saying that he would not comment on an ongoing legal process and that he knows little about the case.

Lawson hired the law firm Weinburg, Sweeten, and Green, to defend him, while he asserted that he was confident he could fight off the claims, which he described as "a vicious attempt to attack me". His attorney was J. Purdon Wright, who was also a Republican leader. State's Attorney for Baltimore J. Bernard Wells assigned deputy William H. Maynard to Lawson's case. He was found guilty, being sentenced to three years in prison; he was granted a partial pardon by Governor of Maryland Herbert O'Conor.

Police appointments
| Preceded by Charles D. Gaither | Commissioner of the Baltimore Police Department; 1937–1938 | Succeeded by Stephen G. Nelson (acting) |
