= Pray for Me, Paul Henderson =

1989 Canadian television film

- Genre: Teen comedy-drama
- Written by: Malcolm MacRury
- Directed by: Brad Turner
- Starring: Yannick Bisson; Torquil Campbell; Richard Chevolleau; Samantha Follows
- Country of origin: Canada
- Original language: English

Production
- Producer: Kim Todd
- Running time: 45 minutes
- Production company: Atlantis Films

Original release
- Network: CBC Television
- Release: November 5, 1989

Pray for Me, Paul Henderson is a Canadian television comedy-drama film, directed by Brad Turner and broadcast by CBC Television in 1989. Set in 1972 against the backdrop of the Canada-USSR Summit Series, the film centres on four high school students — nerdy overachiever Cameron Alexander (Torquil Campbell), his best friend Russell (Richard Chevolleau), poetry-loving hippie Cynthia Maclean (Samantha Follows) and football jock Michael Starnoulis (Yannick Bisson) — who come together to compete as the school team in Reach for the Top and become heroes of their school as they reach the national finals against all odds.

CBC journalist Jan Tennant, who had been an announcer for the real Reach for the Top in the early 1970s, reprised her role in the film.

The film aired on November 5, 1989 as an episode of CBC's Magic Hour anthology of youth and family television films.

Hester Riches of the Vancouver Sun praised the film, opining that CBC should consider turning it into a series and concluding that "we might have a Canadian Wonder Years on our hands".

== Awards ==
Award	Date of ceremony	Category	Nominees	Result	Reference
Gemini Awards	December 4, 1990	Best Short Dramatic Program	Kim Todd, Michael MacMillan, Seaton McLean, Peter Sussman	Nominated	
Gemini Awards	December 4, 1990	Best Direction in a Dramatic Program or Mini-Series	Brad Turner	Nominated	
Gemini Awards	December 4, 1990	Best Writing in a Dramatic Program or Mini-Series	Malcolm MacRury	Nominated	
