= Ellen Robertson =

British actress and writer

- Education: Cambridge University
- Occupations: Actress; Writer
- Years active: 2018–present

Ellen Robertson is an English actress and writer.

== Early life ==
Robertson attended St. Helen's and St. Katharine's School, a private school in Abingdon.

== Career ==
While a student at Cambridge University, Robertson was a member of the Cambridge Footlights. Whilst studying in school in Oxfordshire she attended a playwriting workshop with Charly Clive with the pair first performing together in 2009 and later travelling together during their gap year. Robertson lived with Clive after Clive was diagnosed with a brain tumour in 2016 and had to return to the UK having previously moved to New York. They later turned the experience into a stage show Britney, the name Clive had given to her tumour, which was performed at Edinburgh Fringe Festival and the Soho Theatre in London. Proceeds from the show were donated to The Pituitary Foundation.

She also appeared on stage in the Mike Bartlett play Snowflake in Oxford and reprised the role at the Kiln Theatre, directed by Clare Lizzimore in 2019. She could be seen as Poppy in the Sarah Phelps television series The Pale Horse in 2020. On stage, she appeared in the world premiere of the Mike Bartlett play Mrs Delgado in 2021 at the Old Fire Station, Oxford. Britney was adapted for television, starring both Robertson and Clive, and broadcast on BBC Three in 2021 with a cast including Omid Djalili and Tony Gardner alongside the pair. The following year, Robertson and Clive returned to the Edinburgh Fringe Festival with their show Britney: Friends and Nothing More, named after a comedy song Clive wrote for Robertson after she came out.

Robertson appeared in the Bong Joon Ho directed feature film Mickey 17, alongside Robert Pattinson (2024) and appeared in the Black Mirror episode Joan Is Awful alongside Annie Murphy on Netflix (2024). She was cast in Lena Dunham’s 2025 Netflix series Too Much. That year, she was cast in Vladimir alongside Leo Woodall and Rachel Weisz.

== Personal life ==
Robertson has been in a relationship with comedian Catherine Bohart since 2022.

== Filmography ==
Year	Title	Role	Notes
2020	The Pale Horse	Poppy	2 episodes
2020	In My Skin	Jodie	1 episode
2021	Pls Like	Freya	1 episode
2021	Britney	Ellen	Also writer
2022	The Outlaws	Rentagob	1 episode
2023	Black Mirror	Sandy's pal	Episode: Joan Is Awful
2023	Breeders	Jude	1 episode
2024	Portraits of Dangerous Women	Liz	
2024	Mickey 17	Jennifer Chilton	Feature film
2025	Too Much	Gabi	1 episode
2026	Vladimir	Sid	8 episodes
