= Mallori Johnson =

American actress

Mallori Johnson (born August 18, 1998 ) is an American actress. She portrayed Dana James in the 2022 television series Kindred. She also appeared in the 2022 miniseries WeCrashed.

Johnson was born in San Diego. She graduated from the Juilliard School in 2021.

== Filmography ==
=== Film ===
| Year | Title | Role | Notes |
|---|---|---|---|
| 2023 | The Other Zoey | Elle | |
| 2025 | Steal Away | Cecile | |
| 2026 | Is God Is | Anaia the Quiet One | |

=== Television ===
| Year | Title | Role | Notes |
|---|---|---|---|
| 2022 | WeCrashed | Bea | 4 episodes |
| 2022 | Kindred | Dana James | 8 episodes |
| 2026 | Vladimir | Edwina | 4 episodes |
