= The Other Zoey =

2023 film by Sara Zandieh

- Theatrical release poster
- Directed by: Sara Zandieh
- Written by: Matt Tabak
- Produced by: Mike Karz; William Bindley; Matthew Tabak; Matt Luber; Lena Roklin
- Starring: Josephine Langford; Drew Starkey; Archie Renaux; Mallori Johnson; Patrick Fabian; Heather Graham; Andie MacDowell
- Cinematography: Eve Cohen
- Edited by: Maysie Hoy
- Music by: John Swihart
- Production company: Gulfstream Pictures
- Distributed by: Brainstorm Media
- Release date: October 20, 2023
- Running time: 91 minutes
- Country: United States
- Language: English
- Box office: $168,099

The Other Zoey is a 2023 American romantic comedy film directed by Sara Zandieh and written by Matt Tabak. The film stars Josephine Langford, Drew Starkey, Archie Renaux, Mallori Johnson, Patrick Fabian, Heather Graham and Andie MacDowell.

Zoey Miller's love life is turned upside-down when Zach MacLaren, the school's soccer star, gets amnesia and mistakes her for his girlfriend, who is coincidentally named Zoey as well.

It received a limited release in theaters on October 20, 2023 and launched on Amazon Prime Video both in streaming media format and as video on demand.

== Plot ==
Zoey Miller, a highly intelligent Computer science junior at Queens University of Charlotte, does not believe in the traditional concept of romantic love, instead arguing that having similar ways of thinking is the key. On Valentine's Day she speaks up against fellow student Becca's presentation on Saint Valentine in a history class, insisting that the holiday is a product of capitalism. She has designed an app that will effectively match people based on algorithms.

As Zoey is crossing campus with her roommate and friend Elle when she is accidentally struck in the head by a ball kicked by the school's soccer star, Zach MacLaren. He rushes over to apologize. Elle finds it romantic, but Zoey shrugs it off. In a subsequent class, another student has an almost identical view to Zoey when love is discussed, but leaves before she can tell him so.

Zach visits the campus bookstore where Zoey works. He leaves his credit card behind after ordering a book. Zoey runs after him to give it back as he speeds off on his bike, and he crashes into a reversing car. Zoey is the first person he sees when he comes to, and as he hears her name, he mistakes her for his girlfriend, who is coincidentally also named Zoey.

Zoey accompanies Zach to the hospital, where she bumps into his parents. They also confuse her for his girlfriend, but as he has amnesia no one realizes the error. The doctor tells them to avoid upsetting Zach until he recovers, so his parents have her over for dinner. She meets Zach's younger sister Avery and his cousin Miles, who is the student she had seen with similar views to hers from the lecture. Zoey continues to discover things she has in common with him. They invite her along for a family ski weekend. Hoping to spend more time with Miles, Zoey cancels her scheduled flight to visit her mother, Paula, and joins the MacLarens instead.

As Zach has to stay in the rented house to rest, Zoey goes to the slopes where Miles teaches her to snowboard. They are mutually attracted and kiss when they find themselves alone briefly in the hot tub that night. In the morning when Zach mentions Miles' girlfriend, she confronts him, but he explains they are polyamorous.

Disappointed, Zoey chooses to spend the next day keeping Zach company. They play games and cook together. By the end of the day, Zoey feels a bond with him, saying that she hopes he remembers how nice this day was once his amnesia is gone.

Upon their return to the MacLarens', the soccer-playing Zoey arrives, accusing Zoey of identity theft. She is able to explain the circumstances, and apologizes for deceiving them. As Zoey leaves, Avery blurts out that she prefers her to soccer Zoey.

Back in class, outlandish rumors circulate about Zoey. She ends up falling out with Elle, upset that she had convinced her to lie, though they later make up. Then Becca proposes she help them promote the upcoming Jam Fest to restore her image by creating a web page for the event.

After working through the night to get the website up and running, Zoey plans on watching Jam Fest from home. Insisting that Zach is at the event and available, Elle drags her there before it finishes. She stops the music to find him. Once she does, Zoey confesses her feelings, Zach admits he broke up with soccer Zoey because of his feelings and they kiss.

== Cast ==
- Josephine Langford as Zoey Miller
- Drew Starkey as Zach MacLaren
- Archie Renaux as Miles MacLaren, Zach's cousin
- Mallori Johnson as Elle
- Andie MacDowell as Connie MacLaren, Zach's mother
- Patrick Fabian as Matt MacLaren, Zach's father
- Heather Graham as Paula
- Olive Abercrombie as Avery MacLaren, Zach's young sister
- Amalia Yoo as Becca
- Maggie Thurmon as Zoey Wallace
- Jorge López as Diego
- Gabriella Saraivah as Francesca
- Christie Lynn Smith as Mrs. Wallace

== Production ==
In December 2021, it was announced that Josephine Langford, Drew Starkey and Archie Renaux were cast in the film. Later that month, it was announced that Andie MacDowell, Heather Graham and Patrick Fabian joined the cast and that production began in North Carolina. In January 2022, it was reported that Mallori Johnson, Maggie Thurmon, Jorge López, Gabriella Saraivah and Amalia Yoo joined the cast of the film.

== Release ==
The Other Zoey was released in limited theaters by Brainstorm Media on October 20, 2023, followed by a video on demand release.

== Reception ==
On the review aggregator website Rotten Tomatoes, 87% of 15 critics' reviews are positive, with an average rating of 6.5/10.

Dennis Harvey of Variety called it "a pleasant enough diversion for those who want familiar genre beats sounded by the usual attractive actors in the customary attractive settings."
