= Brad Turner (director) =

Canadian film director, television director and photographer

- Born: Bayfield, Ontario, Canada
- Occupations: Film director, television director, television producer, photographer
- Years active: 1979–present

Brad Turner is a Canadian film director, television director and photographer.

== Life and career ==
Born in Bayfield, Ontario, Canada, on June 22. He graduated with honours from the Television Arts Program at H. B. Beal Secondary School in London, Ontario.

In all he has directed thirteen films, and over two hundred episodes of television. He has been nominated six times for Gemini Awards for directing, and in 2004 he won one for his work in the CBC mini series Human Cargo. He also has won two Directors Guild of Canada Awards for the same production. In 2005, Human Cargo was also given a Peabody Award. Turner has also won a Manitoba Film Award for Best Director in a television film and has been nominated for an American Cable Ace Award for Best Director.

Brad also has a love for fine art, and owns the Turner Gallery which sells and promotes living Canadian artists. The gallery is located in his home town of Bayfield, Ontario.

On the fifth season of 24 he became one of the main directors on the show directing half the season with Jon Cassar. He started as a producer that season and a supervising producer on season 6, season 7 as a co-executive producer. In the eight season, he was promoted to executive producer, also directing the series finale. He won a Primetime Emmy Award in 2006, as part of the show's production team.

Some of his other television directing credits include Airwolf, 21 Jump Street, La Femme Nikita, Mutant X, The Outer Limits, Alias, Stargate Atlantis, Stargate SG-1, Smallville, Homeland and among other series.

Turner is also a photographer. Many of his photos can be viewed on his official website.

== Selected filmography ==
=== Television series ===
- Stargate Atlantis (6 episodes, 2004–2006)
- Stargate SG-1 (8 episodes, 1997–2005)
- Alias (1 episode, 2005)
- Smallville (1 episode, 2005)
- Las Vegas (2 episodes, 2005)
- 24 (46 episodes, 2004–2010)
- Battlestar Galactica (1 episode, 2004)
- The Outer Limits (17 episodes, 1995–2002)
- La Femme Nikita (9 episodes, 1998–2001)
- Andromeda (6 episodes, 2001–2005)
- Jeremiah (2 episodes, 2002)
- Blade: The Series (1 episode, 2006)
- Bones (2 episodes, 2009)
- Hawaii Five-0 (8 episodes, 2010–2011)
- The Secret Circle (1 episode, 2011)
- Homeland (1 episode, 2011)
- Nikita (2 episodes, 2012)
- Alcatraz (1 episode, 2012)
- Psych (3 episodes, 2013–2014)
- Daredevil (1 episode, 2015)
- Agents of S.H.I.E.L.D. (3 episodes, 2016–2018)
- The Shannara Chronicles (2016–2017)
- Take Two (1 episode, 2018)
- V Wars (4 episodes, 2019)
- Next (episode "File #9", 2020)
- Accused (1 episode, 2023)
- Alert: Missing Persons Unit (3 episodes, 2024–2025)
- The Institute (2 episodes, 2025)
- Safehaven (10 episodes, 2025)
- Boston Blue (1 episode, 2026)

=== Films/miniseries ===
- Goofballs (1987)
- What's Wrong with Neil? (1989)
- Pray for Me, Paul Henderson (1989)
- Paris or Somewhere (1994)
- Major Crime (1997)
- Peacekeepers (1997)
- This Matter of Marriage(1998)
- The Inspectors (1998)
- Roswell: The Aliens Attack (1999)
- Must Be Santa (1999)
- The Inspectors 2: A Shred of Evidence (2000)
- The Wandering Soul Murders (2001)
- A Colder Kind of Death (2001)
- Jinnah – On Crime: Pizza 911 (2002)
- The New Beachcombers (2002)
- Jinnah: On Crime – White Knight (2003)
- Black Widow (2003)
- Human Cargo (2004)
- Species III (2004)
- Prison Break: The Final Break (2009)
- Outage (2018, short film)
- Trigger Point (2021)
