= Poor Boy's Game =

Canadian drama film by Clement Virgo

- Directed by: Clement Virgo
- Written by: Clement Virgo; Chaz Thorne
- Produced by: Clement Virgo; Chaz Thorne; Damon D'Oliveira
- Starring: Rossif Sutherland; Danny Glover; Flex Alexander
- Cinematography: Luc Montpellier
- Edited by: Susan Maggi
- Music by: Byron Wong
- Production company: Astral Media
- Release date: February 11, 2007
- Running time: 104 minutes
- Country: Canada
- Language: English
- Budget: $5.5 million

Poor Boy's Game is a 2007 Canadian drama film directed by Clement Virgo. Co-written with Nova Scotian writer/director Chaz Thorne (Just Buried), it is the story of class struggle, racial tensions, and boxing, set in the Canadian east coast port city of Halifax, Nova Scotia. The film premiered on February 11, 2007, at the Berlin International Film Festival. The movie stars Danny Glover, Rossif Sutherland, Greg Bryk, Flex Alexander and Laura Regan.

Poor Boy's Game opened in Halifax cinemas on November 9, 2007.

In 2023, Telefilm Canada announced that the film was one of 23 titles that will be digitally restored under its new Canadian Cinema Reignited program to preserve classic Canadian films.

== Plot ==
Donnie Rose (Rossif Sutherland) plays a former boxer who is released from prison after serving time for a vicious assault on a Black teen that left the teen physically and mentally disabled. The beating of the teen sparked outrage and further divided the historically segregated city of Halifax. Upon his release from prison, he is surprised by a hero's 'welcome home' party at his brother Keith Rose's (Greg Bryk) house and other members of the White community in Halifax. While at the party Donnie is confronted by the victim's father George Carvery (Danny Glover) who is holding a gun contemplating shooting Donnie to avenge the assault of his son. After a tense, heated exchange between George and Keith who is wielding a baseball bat, Donnie tells George "Just do what you came here to do". After contemplating for a few moments George returns to his car and drives back to his mostly African Nova Scotian North End Halifax- area home. At this time, we get the first glance at his family, his wife Ruth Carvery (Tonya Williams) and his mentally and physically challenged son Charles (K. C. Collins). The condition of Charles has an obvious strain on their marriage, as just the sight of Charles's condition forces them to come to grips that he will never again lead a 'normal life'.

The release of Donnie from prison is much to the chagrin of members of the Black community in Halifax. Ossie Parris (Flex Alexander) a famous boxing champion challenges Donnie to a fight in the hopes of seeking retribution for the vicious attack that left Charles disabled, offer him $20,000 to participate in the prize fight. Knowing that Ossie will use the opportunity to murder Donnie in the ring, George offers to train Donnie in order from keeping him from being killed. Later in the movie members of the Black community attempt to enter a night club which has an unofficial policy of not allowing blacks to enter. The clubs security force which is headed by Keith, Donnie and other members of the White community, refuse entry to the Black would be party goers. A fight at the club's entrance ensues with gunfire breaking out and a car being lit on fire (the scene is to resemble the Halifax race riot in 1991 in which over 150 Black and White clashed outside a downtown Halifax bar, after Black men were continually being denied entry in local bar establishments due to their race). Looking for further retribution Keith's crew burned down the Black community church. Members of Ossie's crew then kidnap and savagely beat Keith to death, leaving him at the same location where the beating of Charles took place years earlier. Donnie then goes to the Halifax Black Baptist Church during Sunday congregation to kill the culprits, but then leaves the church, instead deciding to turn in the suspects. Days before the fight Donnie and George meet at the same place where both their loved ones suffered brutal attacks, and they share a deep moment that put the film in perspective. George explains that he has a resenting hate in heart from all his years of struggle, and tells Donnie that he has the same hate in his heart and he must let it go. It is then that it was revealed that it was, in fact Keith that brutally beat Charles, and that he only confessed because he was a minor and would have served less time than his brother.

On fight night Donnie enters the ring to a chorus of boos from the crowd. The fight goes back and forth between both fighters landing decisive blows. With George and his family in attendance, Charles suffers an 'episode' and climbs in the ring, causing an already agitated crowd to throw chairs and enter the ring themselves. A riot breaks out in which both Ossie and Donnie fight off crazed fight fans. The fight is subsequently forfeited and Donnie hangs up his gloves to symbolize the giving up of his hate.

== Development ==
Inspired to write a play about race in Halifax, due to his cousin being violently murdered by his cousin's girlfriends, ex-boyfriend who is Black. Thorne recalled, "It got me thinking about race- and race in Halifax." "That was the original inspiration for (the story)." Years later in 1999, Thorne writes a play called Poor Boys Game, which centers around race, revenge, and forgiveness. While working in Toronto as a struggling actor, Thorne screenplay was chosen for one of the six finalists for Toronto International Film Festival Pitch This competition. Although he doesn't win, panel judge Ralph Zimmerman (who was Clement Virgo agent) suggest he meet with Virgo to discuss developing the screenplay for the big screen. By the autumn of 2005, the script is completed after 17 drafts. Virgo and his business partner at Conquering Lion Damon D' Oliveira fly to L.A to meet with Danny Glover to star in the film. Glover's commitment to the lead role is enough to trigger financing from Telefilm, the Nova Scotia Film Development Corporation, Ontario Media Development Corporation and The Movie Network. In the spring of 2006, Virgo begins casting for the movie and auditions over 100 actors to play the role of Donnie Rose. He later chooses Rossif Sutherland - half-brother of Kiefer Sutherland - which many though a risky move since Sutherland was virtually unknown at the time. However, Virgo justified his choice in Sutherland believing that he could cast a young actor will be able to tell the story. Adding to the controversy of casting Sutherland, is that he is 20 pounds overweight months before the shooting of the film. However, he gets into fighting trim, by converting the 20 pounds of fat to muscle. While filming the movie in the summer of 2006, Virgo only has three days to cover the climatic boxing sequence, which he calls the "most daunting aspect of the film."

== Critical reception ==
Although the film was well received overseas, many Canadian movie critics dismissed it as a subpar boxing film. As National Post film critic Jay Stone put it, "this isn’t Raging Bull. It's not even Rocky". The review by Rick Groen in The Globe and Mail was extremely critical of the film stated that any attempt to find the film even "remotely inspiring" should be "beat[en] back with a hockey stick". He went even further by saying, Poor Boy's Game was a "top-heavy melodrama that hopes to explore the city's racial divide and concomitant cycle of violence. Hopes to but doesn’t, leaving us with a big theme in vain search of a credible narrative.

However, a few critics were able to catch the nuances of the film context, including Sean Flinn of the Globe and Mail who understood the film was "Set in various working-class areas of Halifax, the film uses boxing as a lens on themes such as racism, vengeance, redemption and forgiveness".

== Accolades ==
The film won numerous awards including Atlantic Film Festival's Atlantic Canadian Award. Best Atlantic Feature Film or Video Clement Virgo. Craft Award: Art Direction William Fleming. Directors Guild of Canada: Nomination Direction - Feature Film Clement Virgo. Production Design - Feature Film William Fleming. Sound Editing - Feature Film. Directors Guild of Canada: Nominated DGC Craft Award. Genie Awards: Nominated for Best Performance by an Actor in a Supporting Role Danny Glover Best Achievement in Music - Nominated for Best Original Song- Byron Wong and Luke Nicholson for the song "Breathe". Vancouver Film Critics Circle Best Supporting Actor in a Canadian Film Greg Bryk.

The film was screened at the inaugural edition of the Nova Scotia Retro Film Festo in January 2025.

== See also ==
- List of boxing films
