= Vladimir (TV series) =

2026 American television limited series

- Promotional poster
- Genre: Comedy drama
- Created by: Julia May Jonas
- Based on: Vladimir by Julia May Jonas
- Starring: Rachel Weisz; Leo Woodall; Jessica Henwick; Ellen Robertson; John Slattery
- Music by: Tim Phillips
- Country of origin: United States
- Original language: English
- No. of episodes: 8

Production
- Executive producers: Sharon Horgan; Jason Winer; Jon Radler; Julia May Jonas; Stacey Greenberg; Kira Carstensen; Robert Pulcini; Shari Springer Berman; Rachel Weisz
- Producer: Chris Pavoni
- Cinematography: Tim Orr; Francois Dagenais
- Editors: John Grenham; Tim Streeto; Ken Eluto; Meg Reticker
- Running time: 27–32 minutes
- Production companies: Merman; Astral Projection; Small Dog Picture Company; 20th Television

Original release
- Network: Netflix
- Release: March 5, 2026

Vladimir is an American comedy drama television limited series starring Rachel Weisz and Leo Woodall. It is an adaptation of the Julia May Jonas book of the same name. The series was released on Netflix on March 5, 2026.

== Synopsis ==
Vladimir opens with a narrator, M, describing a sense that she has lost control over the people around her. In the opening scene, set in a remote cabin, a man later revealed to be Vladimir Vladinski is tied to a chair wearing only a cardigan and his underwear. The story then moves backward six weeks to recount the events that led to the moment.

M is preparing for her 30th faculty retreat at the university where she teaches. While shopping at a grocery store, she steals several curious glances at a man who briefly looks back at her. Later that day, she arrives late to a faculty meeting concerning a sex scandal involving her husband, John, where the man from the grocery store, Vladimir Vladinski, is present. After the meeting, Vladimir casually touches her arm during conversation before being interrupted by his wife Cynthia.

The next day, Vladimir arrives for a dinner M had previously invited him to, where he gives her a copy of his book. Their dinner ends when John unexpectedly returns home. John apologizes for the turmoil surrounding the accusations and reveals that another former student has joined the complaints against him. M pressures a colleague, David, to help delay John's disciplinary hearing so he can quietly retire. David initially refuses, but M threatens to reveal their past affair, forcing him to reconsider. Soon afterward, M learns that John's hearing has been postponed until summer.

M begins writing again. John's situation worsens after he is seen at a bar with a much younger date and runs into the university president; as a result, his disciplinary hearing is moved back to its original date. M's behavior begins growing more erratic. Her professional situation deteriorates as complaints about her teaching and behavior accumulate. She becomes increasingly distracted by fantasies about Vladimir and conflicts with colleagues and students.

Vladimir later proposes that they have lunch to discuss her book on the same day as John’s hearing. Instead of attending the hearing, the narrator chooses to meet him. They spend the afternoon drinking wine and discussing literature. M eventually invites him to her remote cabin, which he reluctantly agrees to.

At the cabin, they continue drinking and discussing their books. Not wanting Vladimir to leave, M crushes Clonazepam tablets into a drink and drugs Vladimir. After he becomes disoriented, she restrains him to a chair, recreating the opening scene of the series. While he is unconscious, she uses his phone to send a message to Cynthia suggesting that she has been cheating on him with John (after spotting the two of them meeting late at night), then destroys it.

When Vladimir awakens in confusion, M tells him that he had asked her to participate in a domination fantasy the previous night and that Cynthia and John are having an affair. Vladimir later admits that he had wanted to kiss her the first time he saw her, and they have sex. M then sends him to the guest room and begins writing furiously, convinced she has discovered the ending of her novel.

John later arrives at the cabin and denies the accusation, revealing that he and Cynthia simply take Adderall together while writing. He also reveals that the complaints against him have been dismissed, although he is no longer allowed to teach and will instead retire with his pension. Soon afterward, a fire breaks out in the cabin. As the flames spread, M chooses to save her novel rather than help John and Vladimir escape. She watches the building burn, though M tells the audience she called for help as sirens appear in the distance.

== Cast and characters ==
=== Main ===
- Rachel Weisz as M
- Leo Woodall as Vladimir, a recently hired assistant professor for the English Department
- Jessica Henwick as Cynthia, Vladimir's wife and a recently hired adjunct professor
- Ellen Robertson as Sid, M and John's 27-year-old daughter and an attorney in New York City
- John Slattery as John, M's husband and the chair of the English Department who is recently suspended due to sleeping with students

=== Recurring ===
- Matt Walsh as David, the interim head of the English Department while John is suspended
- Miriam Silverman as Florence, M's work frenemy
- Kayli Carter as Lila, M's former student and a complainant against John's case
- Milton Barnes as Andre
- Elisa Moolecherry as Priya
- Mallori Johnson as Edwina
- Louise Lambert as Dawn, an adjunct professor

=== Guest stars ===
- Tattiawna Jones as Alexis, Sid's 35-year-old girlfriend
- Kari Matchett as Lynn, the college president's wife

== Episodes ==
No.	Title	Directed by	Written by	Original release date	Prod. code
1	"We Have Always Lived in the Castle"	Shari Springer Berman & Robert Pulcini	Julia May Jonas	March 5, 2026	1RJA01
2	"The Awakening"	Shari Springer Berman & Robert Pulcini	Julia May Jonas	March 5, 2026	1RJA02
3	"Enormous Changes at the Last Minute"	Francesca Gregorini	Susan Soon He Stanton	March 5, 2026	1RJA03
4	"Bad Behavior"	Josephine Bornebusch	Matthew Capodicasa	March 5, 2026	1RJA04
5	"Play It As It Lays"	Josephine Bornebusch	Jeanie Bergen	March 5, 2026	1RJA05
6	"Because It Is Bitter And Because It Is My Heart"	Francesca Gregorini	Colette Burson	March 5, 2026	1RJA06
7	"Everything That Rises Must Converge"	Francesca Gregorini	Julia May Jonas	March 5, 2026	1RJA07
8	"Against Interpretation"	Shari Springer Berman & Robert Pulcini	Julia May Jonas	March 5, 2026	1RJA08

== Production ==
The eight-part limited series is created by Julia May Jonas based on her novel of the same name, with Rachel Weisz leading the cast. Weisz and Jonas executive produce the series alongside Sharon Horgan, Stacy Greenberg, and Kira Carstensen of Merman as well as Jason Winer and Jon Radler of Small Dog Picture Company. 20th Television, where Small Dog had an overall deal, is the studio. Shari Springer Berman and Robert Pulcini direct episodes, including the pilot. Berman and Pulcini also serves as executive producers.

In June 2025, Leo Woodall joined the cast as the titular character Vladimir. The following month John Slattery, Ellen Robertson, and Jessica Henwick joined the cast as series regulars as well as Tattiawna Jones, Matt Walsh, Kayli Carter, Miriam Silverman, Louise Lambert, and Mallori Johnson in recurring roles.

Filming began in Toronto on July 2, 2025, running into September 2025.

Tim Phillips composed the score for the series.

== Release ==
The series premiered on Netflix on March 5, 2026.

== Reception ==
The review aggregator website Rotten Tomatoes reported a 74% approval rating based on 54 critic reviews. The website's critics consensus reads, "Vladimir is a promisingly erotic and academic endeavor that cuts through the clichéd noise of typical sex comedies with inspired vigor and actors who make discussions about desire exciting, intellectual, and affecting." Metacritic, which uses a weighted average, assigned a score of 66 out of 100 based on 24 critics, indicating "generally favorable".
