= Charles D. Gaither =

United States Army general

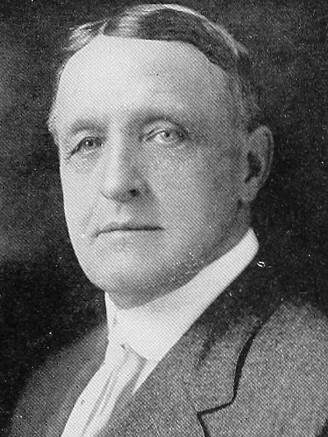
- Gaither in 1920 publication
- Born: November 28, 1860; Howard County, Maryland, U.S.
- Died: March 29, 1947 (aged 86); Baltimore, Maryland, U.S.
- Burial place: Green Mount Cemetery; Baltimore, Maryland, U.S.
- Spouse(s): Alice Stockton Williams (divorced) Second wife (died) Marie L. Towson (m. 1919)
- Children: 2
- Military career
- Allegiance: United States
- Branch: United States Army
- Service years: 18??–1890; 1896–1918
- Rank: Brigadier general
- Conflicts: Spanish–American War; Border War (1910–19)

Commissioner of the Baltimore Police Department
- In office 1920 – May 17, 1937
- Appointed by: Albert Ritchie
- Preceded by: Position established
- Succeeded by: William P. Lawson

Member of the Maryland House of Delegates from the Baltimore's 2nd district
- In office 1888–1888 Serving with Henry Bargar, George Colton, James W. Denny, Patrick Reilly, Alexander H. Robertson

Personal details
- Party: Democratic

Charles D. Gaither (November 27, 1860 – March 29, 1947) was a United States Army officer and police commissioner. He was active in the Maryland Army National Guard in the late 19th and early 20th centuries and in the Baltimore Police Department in the 1920s and 1930s. He served in the Spanish–American War and World War I.

== Early life ==
Charles D. Gaither was born on November 27 (or 20), 1860, in Howard County, Maryland, to Rebecca Hanson (née Dorsey) and George Riggs Gaither. He was born on the family's Oakland Manor 1,800 acres (730 ha) farm two miles south of Ellicott City. His father was an officer who served the Confederate States of America during the American Civil War and the U.S. afterward. When he was a young man, Maryland saw some riots serious enough that the Fifth and Sixth Infantry regiments were called in to help. Gaither observed their actions, and it influenced his decision-making when he later served on the Baltimore police department.

== Career ==
Gaither entered his father's regiment, the 5th Regiment of the Maryland Army National Guard, as a private. He was present at Camden Station during the Great Railroad Strike of 1877. He became colonel of the regiment in 1887 and retained that command until 1896. In 1888, Gaither served as a Democratic member of the Maryland House of Delegates, representing Baltimore's 2nd district. He initially retired in 1890, but was called back into service in 1896 as a captain. He participated in the Spanish–American War, initially stationed in Tampa, Florida. He then went to Cuba and held a command in the Ninth (colored) U.S. Volunteer Infantry. Catching typhoid fever, they were mustered out and returned home. Gaither assumed command of the Fifth Maryland Veterans Corps after he became a colonel, and upon his promotion to brigadier general in 1912, he assumed command of the First Maryland Brigade. That same year, Gaither was in charge of an American rifle team that won an international tournament in Buenos Aires. He served on the Mexican border in 1917, and commanded Fort McClellan for a short time. After commanding the 58th Infantry Brigade, Gaither retired after he discovered he had a heart murmur.

Maryland Governor Albert Ritchie appointed Gaither as the commissioner of the Baltimore Police Department, and he served in the position from 1920 to May 17, 1937. the longest tenure of anyone holding the position. He was replaced as commissioner by William P. Lawson. Observers commented positively on his leadership in this position. Following his retirement, Gaither managed his real estate interests in Baltimore and his 123 acres (50 ha) farm in Howard County.

Gaither died following a heart ailment on March 29, 1947, at Bon Secours Hospital in Baltimore. He was buried at Green Mount Cemetery.

== Personal life ==
Gaither was married three times. He married Alice Stockton Williams, but the marriage ended in divorce. He then married the divorced wife of his brother John Gaither. His second wife died. He married Marie L. Towson in 1919. He had two daughters.

== Bibliography ==
- Davis, Henry Blaine Jr. (1998). Generals in Khaki. Raleigh, North Carolina: Pentland Press. ISBN 1571970886. OCLC 40298151.

Police appointments
Preceded by Position established	Commissioner of the Baltimore Police Department; 1920–1937	Succeeded by William P. Lawson
