= Luke Nicholson =

Canadian musician

- Origin: Lakefield, Ontario, Canada
- Genres: Pop folk
- Occupation: Musician
- Years active: 2007–present
- Label: MapleMusic Recordings
- Website: lukenicholson.ca

Luke Nicholson is a Canadian pop folk singer and songwriter.

== Background ==
Nicholson was born and raised in Lakefield, Ontario. He is the brother of singer-songwriter Royal Wood. Both brothers have similar classic pop styles, and regularly contribute as supporting musicians on each other's albums. Nicholson's music is primarily guitar-based, however, while Wood is better known as a pianist.

== Career ==
Nicholson began his career as a regular house performer at The Cameron House in Toronto. He first attracted wider attention when "Breathe", a song he wrote for the soundtrack to the film Poor Boy's Game, received a Genie Award nomination for Best Original Song at the 28th Genie Awards in 2008.

He subsequently recorded two limited-release independent demo albums, before issuing his first major label record, Mad Love, on MapleMusic Recordings in 2012. Four singles from the album gained significant airplay on CBC Radio 2, with all charting on The Radio 2 Top 20.

Nicholson followed up with Frantic City in 2015, again receiving radio airplay, with the singles "Sadie" and "Maggie's Song".

His newest album, Shape and Sound, was released in April 2017.

Nicholson has toured widely across Canada to support his music, as well as performing festival dates in France and Germany.

== Discography ==
- Mad Love (2012)
- Frantic City (2015)
- Shape and Sound (2017)
