= Boogies Diner =

American sitcom

- Also known as: Boogie's Diner
- Genre: Sitcom
- Starring: Jim J. Bullock; Monika Schnarre; James Marsden; Zack Ward; Richard Chevolleau
- Composer: Eric Allaman
- Countries of origin: Canada; United States
- Original language: English
- No. of seasons: 1
- No. of episodes: 40

Production
- Executive producers: Gordon Farr; Wendy Grean
- Camera setup: Multi-camera
- Running time: 24 mins.
- Production companies: Franklin/Waterman; King Street Entertainment; MTM Enterprises

Original release
- Network: Syndication
- Release: September 17, 1994 – January 1, 1995

Boogies Diner (also known as Boogie's Diner) is a syndicated sitcom that first aired from September 17, 1994, until 1995. It stars Jim J. Bullock, Monika Schnarre, and James Marsden in one of his first appearances on television. The series ended in 1995. The series was produced and distributed by MTM Enterprises (now 20th Television).

== Plot ==
The plot of the show revolves around eight teenagers who work at Boogies Diner, a popular mall hangout. The characters work in various departments of the "diner", which also includes a fashion and music outlet. Gerald (Jim J. Bullock) is the nerdy manager who tries to keep the teenage mischief from affecting the business.

Filmed in Hamilton, Ontario in the facilities of television station CHCH-TV, the series was compared to the American series Saved by the Bell. After the series was canceled, episodes aired on Nickelodeon and CH in Canada.

== Cast ==
- Jim J. Bullock as Gerald
- Richard Chevolleau as Tim
- Katie Griffin as Nikki
- James Marsden as Jason
- Monika Schnarre as Zoya
- Rob Shewchuk as Rob
- Robin Stapler as Cynthia
- Joy Tanner as Cheryl Anne
- Zack Ward as Kirby
