= Conquering Lion Pictures =

Canadian film production company

Conquering Lion Pictures (CLP) is an independent Canadian film production company founded by Clement Virgo and Damon D'Oliveira. Virgo and D'Oliveira met in 1991 while studying at the Canadian Film Centre (CFC), and formed CLP while working on Rude, their first feature film at the CFC.

CLP have produced or co-produced a number of noteworthy films. Their first feature film, Rude (1995), was the first feature film produced by an African-Canadian director, and premiered at Cannes to critical acclaim. Poor Boy's Game (2007), directed by Virgo, premiered at the 2007 Berlin International Film Festival as a "Panorama Special Selection", and was later presented as a Special Selection at the 2007 Toronto International Film Festival. Lie with Me (2005) premiered at the 2006 Berlin International Film Festival as a "Panorama Selection". It caused a stir at the 2005 Toronto International Film Festival for its portrayal of explicit sexual themes, and has since been distributed internationally in over 30 territories and sold to Showtime.

CLP's latest project is The Book of Negroes, based on the Lawrence Hill novel of the same name. Hill's novel won the 2009 Canada Reads contest as well as the Commonwealth Writers' Prize in 2008. CLP's six-part miniseries adaptation premiered on BET in February 2015 and won nine Canadian Screen Awards in 2016, as well as an award for best miniseries by the NAACP.

Other upcoming feature projects include the lesbian western I Shot the Sheriff, and an urban music drama, Enter the Cipher, which was selected for the 2010 Tribeca All Access program.

In 2017, Clement Virgo and Damon D'Oliveira were award the Canadian Film Centre's Award for Creative Excellence, for their filmography created at Conquering Lion Pictures.

In September 2018, it was announced that CLP, along with fellow Canadian film company Hawkeye Pictures, had acquired the rights to Brother, an award-winning novel by David Chariandy.

== Filmography ==
- Rude (1995)
- Love Come Down (2000)
- Lie with Me (2005)
- Poor Boy's Game (2007)
- The Book of Negroes (2015)
- Brother (2022)
- Steal Away (2025)
- The Well (2025)
