= Kindred (TV series) =

American sci-fi television series (2022)

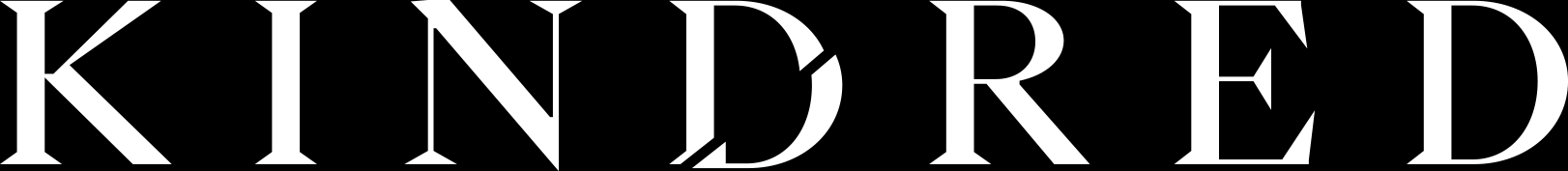
- Genre: Science fiction
- Based on: Kindred by Octavia Butler
- Developed by: Branden Jacobs-Jenkins
- Starring: Mallori Johnson; Micah Stock; Ryan Kwanten; Gayle Rankin; Austin Smith; Antoinette Crowe-Legacy; David Alexander Kaplan
- Composer: Twin Shadow
- Country of origin: United States
- Original language: English
- No. of seasons: 1
- No. of episodes: 8

Production
- Executive producers: Branden Jacobs-Jenkins; Courtney Lee-Mitchell; Darren Aronofsky; Ari Handel; Joe Weisberg; Joel Fields; Ernestine Walker; Merrilee Heifetz
- Production companies: 4th Film Works; The Js; Protozoa Pictures; FXP

Original release
- Network: FX on Hulu
- Release: December 13, 2022

Kindred is an American science fiction television series developed by Branden Jacobs-Jenkins and based on the 1979 novel of the same name written by Octavia E. Butler.

The series premiered with eight episodes on December 13, 2022, on FX on Hulu. In January 2023, the series was canceled after one season.

== Premise ==
Dana has just moved to Los Angeles to establish a life close to her only remaining family, her Aunt Denise, when she gets pulled back in time to the 19th century plantation in Maryland.

The modern setting is 2016.

== Cast ==
- Mallori Johnson as Dana James
- Micah Stock as Kevin Franklin
- Ryan Kwanten as Thomas Weylin
- Gayle Rankin as Margaret Weylin
- Austin Smith as Luke
- David Alexander Kaplan as Rufus Weylin
- Sophina Brown as Sarah
- Sheria Irving as Olivia

== Episodes ==
No.	Title	Directed by	Teleplay by	Original release date
1	"Dana"	Janicza Bravo	Branden Jacobs-Jenkins	December 13, 2022
2	"Sabina"	Amanda Marsalis	Branden Jacobs-Jenkins	December 13, 2022
3	"Furniture"	Amanda Marsalis	Joy Kecken	December 13, 2022
4	"The Waiter from Two Nights Ago"	Ayoka Chenzira	Bobak Esfarjani	December 13, 2022
5	"Winnie"	Ayoka Chenzira	Zenzele Price	December 13, 2022
6	"Celeste"	Destiny Ekaragha	Joy Kecken & Noah J. Rubenstein	December 13, 2022
7	"Jane"	Destiny Ekaragha	Matthew Shire	December 13, 2022
8	"Alice"	Alonso Alvarez-Barreda	Branden Jacobs-Jenkins and Noah J. Rubenstein	December 13, 2022

== Production and release ==
In March 2021, FX Productions announced that it had obtained the rights to adapt Octavia Butler's 1979 novel Kindred into a television series developed by Branden Jacobs-Jenkins. Janicza Bravo directed the pilot episode, and Mallori Johnson was cast in the lead role, in her acting debut. The rest of the main cast was revealed in September 2021, adding Micah Stock, Ryan Kwanten, Gayle Rankin, Austin Smith, Antoinette Crowe-Legacy, and David Alexander Kaplan.

After producing the television pilot, FX ordered the show to a full series in January 2022. Filming took place in June 2022 in Rome, Georgia. Twin Shadow provided the score for the series, making his television scoring debut.

Kindred was released on December 13, 2022, on Hulu. On January 30, 2023, the series was canceled after one season.

== Reception ==
=== Critical reception ===
On the review aggregator website Rotten Tomatoes, 61% of 33 critics' reviews are positive, with an average rating of 6.6/10. The website's consensus reads: "Mallori Johnson acquits herself impressively in a difficult role, but the rest of this ambitious adaptation of Octavia E. Butler's seminal novel is less successful in pulling off its tricky tonal balance." Metacritic, which uses a weighted average, assigned the series a score of 64 out of 100, based on 21 critics, indicating "generally favorable" reviews.

=== Accolades ===
Year	Award	Category	Nominee(s)	Result	Ref.
2023	Hollywood Makeup Artist and Hair Stylist Guild Awards	Best Contemporary Hair Styling in Television and New Media Series	Jamie Amadio, Chantell Carrtherol	Nominated	
2023	NAACP Image Awards	Outstanding Breakthrough Creative (Television)	Branden Jacobs-Jenkins	Nominated	
2023	NAACP Image Awards	Outstanding Writing in a Drama Series	Branden Jacobs-Jenkins	Nominated	
