= Violet Hill Whyte =

American law enforcement officer

- Born: Violet Hill; November 18, 1897; Washington, D.C., United States
- Died: 1980 (aged 82–83)
- Occupation: Police officer
- Known for: First black officer to be appointed to the Baltimore Police Department

Violet Hill Whyte (November 18, 1897 – 1980) was a teacher, the first African-American to be appointed an officer of the Baltimore Police Department in Maryland, and a community activist. She was appointed in December 1937 by Commissioner William P. Lawson, and served for 30 years, reaching the rank of lieutenant. In addition, she participated on numerous community boards and commissions, working to improve the lives of women and children especially in Baltimore.

== Biography ==
Violet Hill was born in Washington D.C., on November 18, 1897. Her parents were Daniel G. Hill and Margaret Peck Hill, and she had nine younger siblings. Among her brothers was Daniel G. Hill II. His son Daniel G. Hill III became a prominent sociologist and activist in Ontario, Canada. Her father was university educated and an ordained minister of the African Methodist Episcopal Church, the first independent black denomination in the United States. Her brother Daniel also graduated from college and became an AME minister, serving in Missouri and the West. Violet Hill graduated from Douglass High School and Coppin State College.

She married George Sumner Whyte and they had four children together. She worked as a public school teacher for nearly two decades in Baltimore, Maryland, before becoming a police officer.

Whyte became interested in working as a police officer. She completed the training program and was appointed in 1937 as the first black officer in the Baltimore Police Department. (Atlanta, Georgia by contrast, did not appoint any black officers to its police department until 1948.) Whyte served for 30 years before retiring, reaching the rank of lieutenant. She died in 1980.

== Career as police officer ==
"I'm not afraid of hard work." – Violet Hill White

Whyte was appointed to the northwest district at Pennsylvania Avenue and Dolphin Street by Commissioner William P. Lawson. She was not given a gun. Her duties included patrolling the streets, homicide investigations, narcotics cases, assaults, cases of sexual abuse, and robberies. She was known to work undercover. Youth who lived in her district said later that she would often intervene when she saw students skipping school. Her efforts earned her the nickname "lady law." Juvenile Court Judge Charles E. Moylan Jr. described her as "a one-woman police force and a one-woman social worker combined". In 1955, she was promoted to sergeant and oversaw policewomen. She ended her career in the Western District. Before her retirement in 1967 after 30 years of service, she was promoted to lieutenant.

Over the course of her career, Whyte earned six commendations and numerous awards. She also served on the following Boards and Commissions: The Governor's Commission to Study Problems of Illegitimacy; cd Called to Testify on National Television on "Kefauver Congressional Committee on U. S. Narcotic Violations"; Secretary to the Board of Directors of Provident Hospital; Secretary to the Board of Managers of Boys' Village of Maryland; Member of the Speakers Bureau of the National Women's Christian Temperance Union; Governor's Commission – A Study "Juvenile Delinquency and Adult Penal Conditions"; Board Member – Maryland Safety Council; and Organizer and Chairperson – Holiday Institutional Committee.

== Community work ==
In addition to her police work, Whyte was an active volunteer: She collected clothing for prison inmates and made holiday baskets for the needy. One year she planned a Christmas party for 4,000 children at the Royal Theatre. She also lectured in the community about child abuse. Her lecture included a six-point child's bill of rights.

After retiring, she continued to volunteer, working with Planned Parenthood as a field supervisor. She also worked with the Neighborhood Family Planning Center.

== Awards ==
- 1956 – In Recognition of her services to the city of Baltimore by F. E. W. Harper Temple No. 429 I. B. P. O. E. W.
- 1963 – Distinguished Citizen Award – Sophists Club Houston-Woods Junior High School
- 1963 – Sigma Wives – Congratulations for Service Rendered and Promotion to Sergeant
- 1964 – Certificate of Appreciation – Guest Speaker Reisterstown Junior Chamber of Commerce
- 1967 – Afro-American for "Superior Public Service Without Thought of Gain"
- 1968 – Democratic Ladies Guild – Community Achievement Award
- 1968 – Mayor Thomas J. D'Alesandro III – City of Baltimore – Outstanding Citizen Award – Thirty Years of Faithful, Exemplary Service to the City of Baltimore
- 1968 – Woman of Conscience Award - National Council of Women of the United States.
- 1971 – Baltimore Safety Council – School and Child Division – Vice President 1971–72, Humanitarian Services to Baltimore Community in Field of Drug Education and Safety
- 1971 – Frederick Douglass High School Hall of Fame
- 1971 – District Police Community Relations Council Award for Meritorious Service
- 1971 – Loyalty, Dedication, Courtesy, Hospitality and Sheer Joy of Knowing that You Passed Our Way .. Zeta-Sigma Chapter, Phi Beta Sigma fraternity
- 1974 – Outreach Award – Imperial Court of Daughters of Isis P. H. A. – "In recognition of the strength you have exhibited and the hardships you have endured, in your crusade to elevate the status of Black Women"
- 1978 – Freedom House Inc. "In recognition of your outstanding contribution to the community through dedicated service demonstrating integrity and professional performance of police duties, meriting our trust and respect"
