= Just Buried =

- Film poster
- Directed by: Chaz Thorne
- Written by: Chaz Thorne
- Produced by: Nigel Bennett; Pen Densham; Bill Niven; Chaz Thorne; John Watson
- Starring: Jay Baruchel; Rose Byrne; Graham Greene; Nigel Bennett
- Cinematography: Christopher Porter
- Edited by: Christopher Cooper
- Music by: Darren Fung; Scott Loane
- Production companies: RGM Entertainment; Standing 8 Productions; Trilogy Entertainment Group
- Distributed by: Liberation Entertainment (USA); Seville Pictures (Canada)
- Release dates: September 9, 2007 (Toronto); July 25, 2008 (Canada)
- Running time: 94 minutes
- Country: Canada
- Language: English

Just Buried is a 2007 Canadian dark comedy film, written and directed by Chaz Thorne. It stars Jay Baruchel and Rose Byrne among several other actors.

== Plot ==
Grocery delivery boy Oliver Whynacht and his brother Jackie go on for what they expect to be a quick in-and-out return visit to their hometown in Nova Scotia for their estranged father's funeral. So, Oliver is surprised to find out when the will is executed that he has inherited his father's whole estate, which includes a funeral home. His widow and the embalmer Roberta Knickel are also taken aback by the news.

Shortly after his arrival, Oliver is told by Henry the handyman that the funeral home is facing bankruptcy, as his father is the first 'customer' they've had in over a year. This is mostly due to sleaze-ball Wayne Snarr opening a rival funeral home in town and, through greasy marketing techniques, poaching all the 'clients' from the retirement home which had been a goldmine for Oliver's father.

A stressed Oliver goes out for a night of drinking with Roberta after which, although he feels he's too drunk to drive, she insists "everyone around here does it". So, they jump into the pickup and stick to secondary roads. Initially everything is fine, they start to click, he takes his eyes off the road for a moment and commits manslaughter by hitting and killing a passing Swiss night hiker with the truck.

Roberta unhesitatingly helps Oliver to cover up the crime, as she is also the local coroner in addition to being the funeral home's embalmer. She and Oliver stage the body so that it appears like an accident. This becomes Oliver's first paying customer.

Oliver's first 'customer' turned out to be wealthy, so his first funeral as director is a success. This engenders the duo to kill again, but intentionally. The scheming Roberta even goads Oliver into eliminating their competition.

Suspicion is raised as the two fight to stay out of jail and stage "accidents" all over town. Ironically, Roberta's father turns out to be the local sheriff.

Due to their mutual partnership Oliver and Roberta begin to fall in love despite Oliver's seductive stepmother Luanne. After Roberta reveals that she is pregnant, the two get married. Shortly afterwards, the truth comes out that Roberta murdered his father to lure Oliver back into town.

It is revealed that Roberta was using Oliver to regain ownership of the funeral home, which originally had belonged to her mother. The film concludes as Roberta kills Oliver and gains possession of the funeral home.

== Cast ==
- Jay Baruchel as Oliver Whynacht
- Rose Byrne as Roberta Knickel
- Graham Greene as Henry Sanipass
- Nigel Bennett as Chief Knickle
- Sergio Di Zio as Jackie Whynacht
- Reagan Pasternak as Luanne
- Thomas Gibson as Charlie Richmond
- Brian Downey as Pickles
- Slavko Negulic as Armin Imholz
- Jeremy Akerman as Rollie Whynacht
- Christopher Shore as Wayne Snarr
- Michael Pellerin as Sam the Wrecker

== Awards ==
Just Buried has been nominated for, and won two awards; in 2007, Chaz Thorne won the Atlantic Canadian Award for Best Director at the Atlantic Film Festival. In 2008, Chaz Thorne won another award for his work on the film. The Jury Award for Best of the Fest was given to Thorne at the Santa Cruz Film Festival.

== Production and release ==
Just Buried was filmed in locations including Halifax, Nova Scotia, Canada and Windsor, Nova Scotia, Canada. The production designer for the film is William Flemming. Set decoration for the whole movie was done by Darlene Lewis. Costumes for the film were designed by Kate Rose who coordinated with key makeup artist Betty Belmore.

The film was initially released at the Toronto International Film Festival on September 9, 2007. The Canada wide release of the film came a less than a year later on July 25, 2008. The film was also released in the United States on October 3, 2008.

== Reception ==
The film received mixed reviews from critics and users. As of June 2020, the film holds a 33% approval rating on Rotten Tomatoes, based on nine reviews with an average rating of 4.67/10.

Andrew Barker of Variety called the film "Bloody and irredeemably misanthropic" stating that the film "has enough charm to make for a sporadically enjoyable if wildly uneven entry in the growing body of cheeky corpse comedies." This review also calls attention to several actor's performances in the film including those of Jay Baruchel whom he found misplayed the role. Barker states that the two standout performances were that of Graham Greene who played Henry Sanipass, and Christopher Shore who played Wayne Snarr.
