= Junior Williams =

Junior Williams may refer to:

- Junior Williams (footballer), a Grenadian football player
- Junior Williams (cricketer), a Jamaican former first-class cricketer
