= Susan Maggi =

Canadian film editor

- Born: Canada
- Occupation: Film and TV editor

Susan Maggi is a Canadian film editor. She is a four-time Genie Award nominee and has also been nominated for three Gemini Awards and two Directors Guild of Canada for "Best Achievement in Picture Editing". Maggi is a member of the Canadian Cinema Editors Honors Society.

== Recognition ==
- 2013 Directors Guild of Canada Award for Best Achievement in Editing - World Without End - miniseries - Nominated -
- 2009 Gemini Award for Best Picture Editing in a Dramatic Program or Series - Being Erica - Nominated
- 2008 Genie Award for Best Achievement in Editing - Poor Boy's Game - Nominated
- 2004 Directors Guild of Canada DGC Team Award Outstanding Team Achievement in a Family Feature Film - Goose on the Loose - Nominated
- 2001 Genie Award for Best Achievement in Editing - New Waterford Girl - Nominated
- 2000 Gemini Award for Best Picture Editing in a Dramatic Program or Series - One Heart Broken Into Song - Nominated
- 1998 Gemini Award for Best Picture Editing in a Dramatic Program or Series - The Planet of Junior Brown - Nominated
- 1996 Genie Award for Best Achievement in Editing - The Boys Club - Nominated
- 1996 Genie Award for Best Achievement in Editing - Rude - Nominated
