= Tamara Faith Berger =

Canadian author and novelist

- Occupations: Novelist, writer
- Spouse: Clement Virgo
- Writing career
- Notable awards: Believer Book Award (2012)
- Website: tamarafaithberger.com

Tamara Faith Berger is a Canadian author and novelist. She is best known for her novel Maidenhead, which won the Believer Book Award in 2012. Berger is a self-described feminist.

After completing her bachelor's degree, she worked as a writer of erotic stories. Her themes include women's desire and sexuality, often describing obscene scenarios. Many of her novels explore issues of race and class. Her literary influences include Georges Bataille and Judy Blume.

Her debut novel Lie With Me was adapted into a 2006 film by her husband, the filmmaker Clement Virgo.

She wrote the screenplay for Virgo's 2025 film Steal Away, adapted from a non-fiction book by Karolyn Smardz Frost.

== Awards and honours ==
In 2018, The Walrus included Queen Solomon on their "Ten Canadian Authors on the Best Books of 2018" list.

Awards for Berger's writing
Year	Title	Award	Result	Ref.
2012	Maidenhead	Trillium Book Award, English	Nominee	
2012	Maidenhead	Believer Book Award	Winner	
2013	Maidenhead	ReLit Award for Novel	Shortlist	
2018	Queen Solomon	Trillium Book Award, English	Nominee	
2019	Queen Solomon	ReLit Award for Novel	Shortlist	

== Publications ==
- Lie With Me (2001)
- The Way of the Whore (2004)
- A Woman Alone at Night (2007)
- Maidenhead (2012)
- Kuntalini (2016)
- Queen Solomon (2018)
- Yara (2023)
