= Harry Gairey =

Canadian activist and railway porter

- Born: August 29, 1898
- Died: 1993 (aged 94–95); Toronto, Ontario, Canada
- Occupation: Railway porter
- Known for: Activism

Harry Ralph Gairey (29 August 1898 – 1993) was a Jamaican-born Black Canadian community leader and activist who worked as a railway porter for much of his life.

== Early life ==
Harry Ralph Gairey was born in Jamaica in 1898, one of seven siblings. His father, a businessman, died when Gairey was five and his mother moved the family to Cuba. As a teenager, Gairey worked in a sugarcane mill, taking samples to the site's chemist.

== Canada ==
Gairey moved to Toronto from Cuba in August 1914. He worked for the Grand Trunk Railway as a dishwasher, cook, and waiter until 1932, when Black waiters were laid off in the competition for remaining jobs resulting from the railway's absorption into the operations of Canadian National Railway. He married a Hindu Jamaican dressmaker, Elma, and they had a son, Harry Junior. In 1936, to support his family, Gairey returned to railway work, this time for Canadian Pacific Railway as a porter. The poor working conditions and lack of job security led Gairey, along with other porters including Stanley G. Grizzle, to form a local chapter of the Brotherhood of Sleeping Car Porters labour union in the 1940s. Gairey was promoted to the position of porter instructor in the late 1940s.

In November 1945 Gairey's teenage son, Harry Gairey Jr., was refused entry to the Icelandia indoor skating rink because of his race. The incident and resulting protests by students received substantial news coverage in Toronto. Gairey appealed to his alderman and city council, spurring the creation of Toronto's first anti-discrimination ordinance in 1947. Gairey argued that since conscription applied to all young Canadian men, regardless of race, the rights of every citizen should be the same as well.

Gairey's civil rights activism made him a leader in the Toronto Black community and effected change at a national level. Inspired by the work of Marcus Garvey, he was a charter member of the Toronto branch of the Universal Negro Improvement Association and helped to form the Negro Citizenship Association to advocate for changes to Canada's discriminatory immigration law.

In an obituary, Gairey was lauded for his leadership and his efforts to combat racial discrimination.

== Awards ==
Harry Gairey received the Jamaican Order of Distinction in 1977 in recognition of his long service to the Caribbean communities of Toronto. He was awarded the Order of Canada in 1986 and the Order of Ontario in 1987, its inaugural year. The outdoor skating rink in Alexandra Park, Toronto, was named in Gairey's honour in 1996.
