= Clement Virgo =

Canadian film director

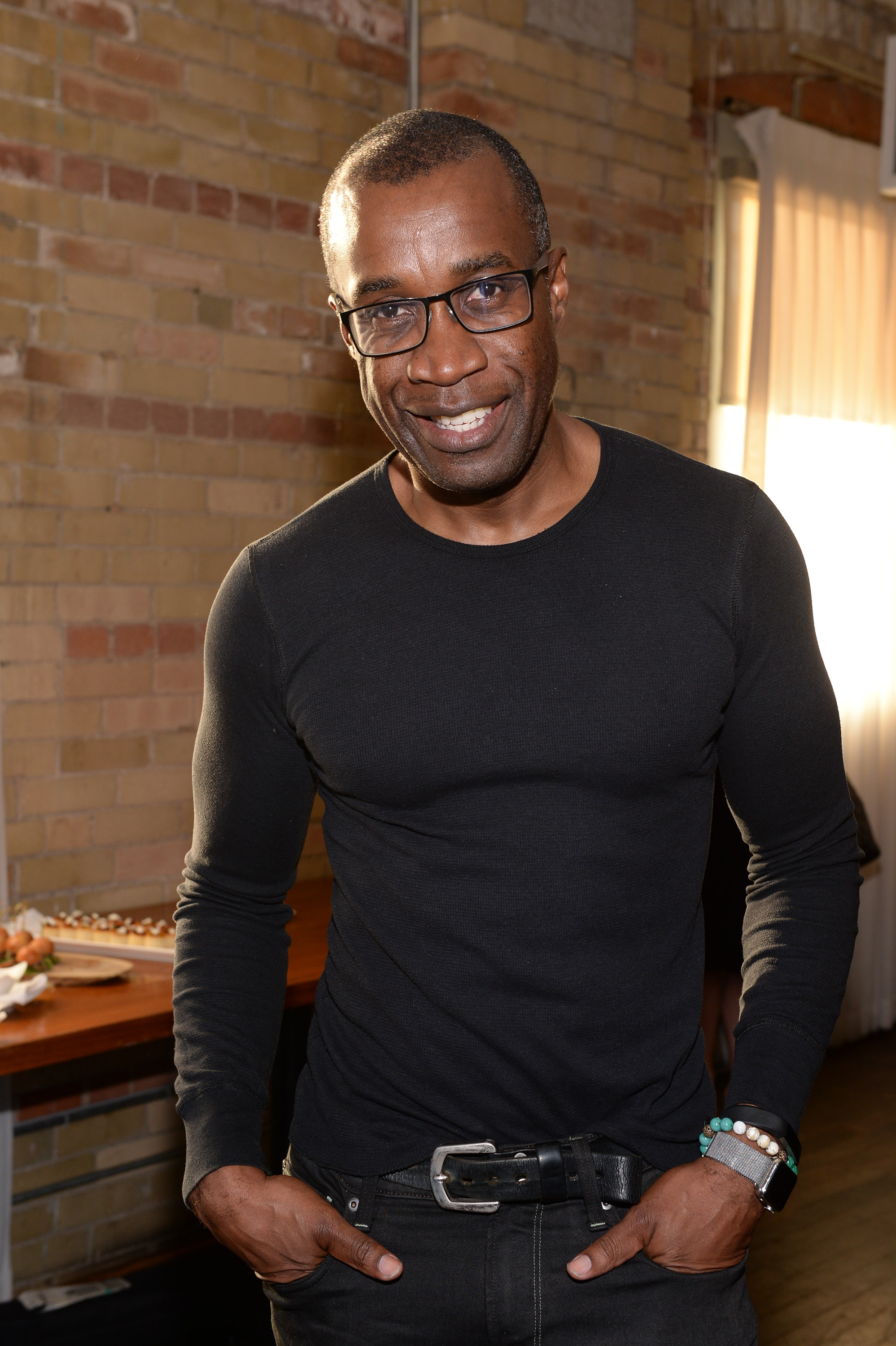
- Virgo in 2017
- Born: June 1, 1966 (age 60); Montego Bay, Cornwall County, Jamaica
- Occupations: Film director, television director, film producer, television producer, screenwriter
- Years active: 1991–present
- Website: conqueringlionpictures.com

Clement Virgo (born June 1, 1966) is a Jamaican-born Canadian film and television writer, producer and director who runs the production company Conquering Lion Pictures with producer Damon D'Oliveira. Virgo is best known for co-writing and directing an adaptation of Lawrence Hill's The Book of Negroes (2015), a six-part miniseries that aired on CBC Television in Canada and BET in the United States.

In 2023, Virgo directed Brother, which was critically acclaimed and received numerous accolades, including a nomination at the 24th Annual Black Reel Awards for Outstanding International Film and 12 awards at the 11th Canadian Screen Awards.

== Early life ==
Virgo was born in Montego Bay, Jamaica. He immigrated to Canada at the age of 11 and grew up in Toronto. In the summer of 1991, he attended the Canadian Film Centre's inaugural Summer Lab initiative as a screenwriter, where he developed the screenplay for what would later become his feature film debut, Rude (1995).

== Career ==
=== Early work ===
At the Canadian Film Centre, Virgo met a number of Canadian filmmakers, including Damon D'Oliveira. Virgo wrote and directed the stylized short film, Save My Lost Nigga' Soul, with D'Oliveira as producer, through the CFC's Short Film Program. The film won Best Film prizes at the Toronto, FESPACO and Chicago film festivals.

Virgo and D'Oliveira were invited to participate in the CFC's film residency program in 1992. Together, the pair established Conquering Lion Pictures and produced their first feature film, Rude. It had its world premiere at Cannes as part of the Un Certain Regard program.

Virgo's next films, The Planet of Junior Brown, which earned an Emmy nomination, and Love Come Down, were followed by Lie with Me, which caused a stir at the 2005 Toronto International Film Festival because it portrayed explicit sexual themes. Starring Lauren Lee Smith and Eric Balfour, Lie With Me had its European premiere at the 2006 Berlin International Film Festival, in the Panorama Section. It has been distributed internationally, and was sold to Showtime in the United States. The film was based on the novel of the same name, written by Virgo's wife, the author Tamara Faith Berger.

=== 2007–present ===
Virgo next created a boxing drama, Poor Boy's Game, starring Danny Glover and Rossif Sutherland. It was first screened at the 2007 Berlin International Film Festival, in the Panorama Special Section, and was presented as a Special Selection at the 2007 Toronto International Film Festival. Poor Boy's Game earned Virgo a nomination in 2007 for the Directors Guild of Canada Outstanding Achievement Craft Award for direction of a motion picture film. In a review for Variety, critic Leslie Felperin praised the film's treatment of race, identity and sexuality, declaring it to be Virgo's best work up to that time.

Virgo co-wrote and directed the six-part miniseries adaptation of Lawrence Hill's bestselling novel The Book of Negroes (2015), starring Aunjanue Ellis, Cuba Gooding Jr., Lou Gossett Jr., Ben Chaplin, Jane Alexander and Lyriq Bent. The series aired to wide acclaim and a record-breaking 1.7 million Canadian viewers in January 2015 on CBC in Canada. It premiered in February 2015 in the United States, drawing landmark ratings for BET (Black Entertainment Television). The series won 11 Canadian Screen Awards; two Critics' Choice Television Awards nominations for Best Limited Series and Best Actress in a Limited Series (Aunjanue Ellis); three 2015 NAACP Image Awards nominations for Best Miniseries, Best Actor (Cuba Gooding Jr.) and Best Actress (Ellis) and a Best Writing in a TV Movie or Miniseries award for Virgo and Lawrence Hill. The Book of Negroes was also named one of 60 finalists for the 2016 Peabody Awards.

Virgo's television credits include The Wire for HBO, The L Word for Showtime, The Get Down for Netflix, and American Crime for ABC. He directed several episodes of the OWN drama series Greenleaf (2016), on which he served as executive producer with Oprah Winfrey.

From 2010 to 2014, Virgo and the Canadian Film Centre co-hosted a series of annual talks to celebrate Black History Month in Toronto, with guests Lee Daniels, Norman Jewison, Spike Lee, Pam Grier, John Singleton and Chris Tucker.

In 2021 Virgo began production on Brother, an adaptation of the award-winning novel by David Chariandy. The film premiered at the 2022 Toronto International Film Festival on September 9, 2022 and was nominated at the 24th Annual Black Reel Awards for Outstanding International Film.

In November 2021, he was announced as the director of the upcoming Black Cyclone, a biopic on legendary cyclist Major Taylor, for Minds Eye Entertainment.

== Accolades ==
In 2017, Virgo and D'Oliveira, as Conquering Lion Pictures co-founders, received the Canadian Film Centre's Award for Creative Excellence.

He won the Canadian Screen Awards for Best Director and the Best Adapted Screenplay at the 11th Canadian Screen Awards in 2023 for Brother, which was also named Best Picture. The film won twelve Canadian Screen Awards overall, at the time the most of any film since Night Zoo in 1988.

== Filmography ==
=== Film ===
- Split-Second Pullout Technique (1992)
- Save My Lost Nigga Soul (1993)
- A Small Dick Fleshy Ass Thang (1993)
- Rude (1995)
- The Planet of Junior Brown (1997)
- Love Come Down (2000)
- Lie with Me (2005)
- Poor Boy's Game (2007)
- Brother (2022)
- Steal Away (2025)

=== Television ===
- Side Effects (1996)
- Soul Food (2000)
- The Wire
  - Episode 1.04 "Old Cases" (2002)
  - Episode 1.12 "Cleaning Up" (2002)
- The L Word (2003)
- Platinum (2004)
- ReGenesis (2005–2006)
- The Listener (2009, 7 episodes)
- Copper (2013, 1 episode)
- The Book of Negroes (2015)
- The Get Down (2016, 1 episode)
- American Crime (2016, 1 episode)
- Greenleaf (2016, 2 episodes)
- Billions (2019, 1 episode)
- Empire (2020, 1 episode)
- Grand Army (2020, 1 episode)
- Monster: The Jeffrey Dahmer Story (2022, 2 episodes)
