= Canadian Screen Award for Best Ensemble Performance in a Comedy Series =

Annual Canadian television award

The Canadian Screen Award for Best Ensemble Performance in a Comedy Program or Series is an award category, presented by the Academy of Canadian Cinema and Television to honour ensemble performance in comedy programs. Winners and nominees were typically either sketch comedy shows, or the collective cast of a scripted narrative comedy series.

When the Gemini Awards were first introduced in 1986, awards were presented for Best Actor in a Comedy Series and Best Actress in a Comedy Series. However, as Canadian television comedy was dominated in that era primarily by sketch comedy, comedy-drama or stand-up performance shows, rather than traditional sitcoms, comedy performance categories were discontinued after the 2nd Gemini Awards in 1987; for the next few years, performances in comedy-drama shows were eligible to be nominated in the drama performance categories, while sketch comedy performers could be nominated for Best Performance in a Variety or Performing Arts Program or Series.

Beginning with the 6th Gemini Awards in 1992, the academy introduced a single award for Best Performance in a Comedy Program or Series, whose winners or nominees could be either an individual or an ensemble; separate awards for Best Individual Performance and Best Ensemble Performance were then introduced for the 16th Gemini Awards in 2001.

After 2010, the Individual Performance category was discontinued; separate categories for Best Actor in a Comedy Series and Best Actress in a Comedy Series were reintroduced, alongside new categories for Best Supporting Actor in a Comedy Series and Best Supporting Actress in a Comedy Series, as of the 26th Gemini Awards in 2011. The ensemble category was still presented in 2011, but was discontinued when the Gemini Awards transitioned into the Canadian Screen Awards the following year; with the 4th Canadian Screen Awards in 2016, a new category was reintroduced for Individual or Ensemble Performance in a Variety or Sketch Comedy Program or Series.

In 2024, the Academy reintroduced a category for Ensemble Performance in a Comedy Series, separately from the awards for individual performance and the award for ensemble performance in sketch comedy.

== Winners and nominees ==
=== 2001-2011 ===
Year	Actors	Series	Ref
2001; 16th Gemini Awards
2001; 16th Gemini Awards	Dan Lett, Peter Keleghan, Leah Pinsent, Emily Hampshire, Rick Mercer, Jackie Torrens	Made in Canada	
2001; 16th Gemini Awards	Kim Bubbs, George Buza, Wayne Robson, Steve Smith, Peter Keleghan, Bob Bainborough, Jeff Lumby	The Red Green Show	
2001; 16th Gemini Awards	Rick Mercer, Greg Thomey, Cathy Jones, Mary Walsh	This Hour Has 22 Minutes	
2001; 16th Gemini Awards	Lucy DeCoutere, John Dunsworth, Mike Smith, John Paul Tremblay, Ardon Bess, Barrie Dunn, Michael Jackson, Jonathan Torrens, Jeanna Harrison, Robb Wells, Patrick Roach	Trailer Park Boys	
2002; 17th Gemini Awards
2002; 17th Gemini Awards	Dan Lett, Peter Keleghan, Leah Pinsent, Rick Mercer, Jackie Torrens	Made in Canada	
2002; 17th Gemini Awards	Colin Mochrie, Greg Thomey, Cathy Jones, Mary Walsh	This Hour Has 22 Minutes	
2002; 17th Gemini Awards	Lucy DeCoutere, John Dunsworth, Mike Smith, John Paul Tremblay, Ardon Bess, Barrie Dunn, Michael Jackson, Jonathan Torrens, Jeanna Harrison, Robb Wells, Patrick Roach, Sarah Dunsworth, Cory Bowles, Sandi Ross	Trailer Park Boys	
2003; 18th Gemini Awards
2003; 18th Gemini Awards	Colin Mochrie, Greg Thomey, Cathy Jones, Mary Walsh	This Hour Has 22 Minutes	
2003; 18th Gemini Awards	Jeff Clarke, Katherine Ashby	A Guy and a Girl	
2003; 18th Gemini Awards	Hélène Joy, Rick Roberts, Stewart Francis, Timm Zemanek, Robin Brûlé, Sugith Varughese, Matthew Ferguson	An American in Canada	
2003; 18th Gemini Awards	Dan Lett, Peter Keleghan, Leah Pinsent, Rick Mercer, Jackie Torrens	Made in Canada	
2003; 18th Gemini Awards	Lucy DeCoutere, John Dunsworth, Mike Smith, John Paul Tremblay, Barrie Dunn, Michael Jackson, Jonathan Torrens, Robb Wells, Patrick Roach, Sarah Dunsworth, Cory Bowles, Elliot Page, Shelley Thompson, Sam Tarasco	Trailer Park Boys	
2004; 19th Gemini Awards
2004; 19th Gemini Awards	Dan Lett, Peter Keleghan, Leah Pinsent, Rick Mercer, Jackie Torrens	Made in Canada: "The Last Show"	
2004; 19th Gemini Awards	Brent Butt, Janet Wright, Tara Spencer-Nairn, Nancy Robertson, Eric Peterson, Gabrielle Miller, Fred Ewanuick, Lorne Cardinal	Corner Gas: "Face Off"	
2004; 19th Gemini Awards	Rebecca Northan, Paul O'Sullivan, Debra McGrath, Lisa Merchant, Peter Oldring	The Joe Blow Show	
2004; 19th Gemini Awards	Shaun Majumder, Greg Thomey, Cathy Jones, Mary Walsh, Mark Critch	This Hour Has 22 Minutes	
2004; 19th Gemini Awards	Robb Wells, John Paul Tremblay, Jonathan Torrens, Cory Bowles, Lucy DeCoutere, Barrie Dunn, John Dunsworth, Sarah Dunsworth, Jeanna Harrison, Tyrone Parsons, Patrick Roach, Mike Smith, Shelley Thompson, Michael Jackson	Trailer Park Boys: "If I Can't Smoke and Swear I'm Fucked"	
2005; 20th Gemini Awards
2005; 20th Gemini Awards	Barrie Dunn, Shelley Thompson, Patrick Roach, Garry James, Tyrone Parsons, Jonathan Torrens, Jeanna Harrison, John Paul Tremblay, Sarah Dunsworth, Lucy DeCoutere, Cory Bowles, John Dunsworth, Mike Smith, Robb Wells, Michael Jackson	Trailer Park Boys: "Working Man"	
2005; 20th Gemini Awards	Rick Green, Ron Pardo, Janet van de Graaf, Bob Bainborough, Teresa Pavlinek	History Bites: "Elizabeth & Mary/Queen Takes Queen, Checkmate"	
2005; 20th Gemini Awards	Gord Robertson, James Rankin, Bob Martin, Dan Redican, Bruce Hunter	Puppets Who Kill: "Buttons on a Hot Tin Roof"	
2005; 20th Gemini Awards	Martin Huisman, Louis Philippe Dandenault, Richard Jutras, Annie Bovaird, Paula Boudreau, Alain Goulem, Tracey Hoyt, Kate Greenhouse, Ryan Tilson, Christian Potenza, Cas Anvar, Victor Chowdury, Dean McDermott, Swikriti Sarkar	The Tournament: "Saturday at the Tournament"	
2005; 20th Gemini Awards	Shaun Majumder, Cathy Jones, Mark Critch, Gavin Crawford	This Hour Has 22 Minutes	
2006; 21st Gemini Awards
2006; 21st Gemini Awards	Shaun Majumder, Cathy Jones, Mark Critch, Gavin Crawford	This Hour Has 22 Minutes	
2006; 21st Gemini Awards	Eric Peterson, Brent Butt, Lorne Cardinal, Gabrielle Miller, Janet Wright, Tara Spencer-Nairn, Fred Ewanuick, Nancy Robertson	Corner Gas: "Merry Gasmas"	
2006; 21st Gemini Awards	Luba Goy, Alan Park, Jessica Holmes, Craig Lauzon, Don Ferguson, Roger Abbott	Royal Canadian Air Farce	
2006; 21st Gemini Awards	Laurie Elliott, Rick Green, Patrick McKenna, Wayne Robson, Steve Smith, Bob Bainborough, Jeff Lumby	The Red Green Show: "Do As I Do"	
2006; 21st Gemini Awards	Ari Cohen, Louis Philippe Dandenault, Richard Jutras, Paula Boudreau, Alain Goulem, Tracey Hoyt, Kate Greenhouse, Christian Potenza, Cas Anvar, Swikriti Sarkar	The Tournament: "The Warrior Women"	
2007; 22nd Gemini Awards
2007; 22nd Gemini Awards	Brent Butt, Lorne Cardinal, Fred Ewanuick, Gabrielle Miller, Eric Peterson, Nancy Robertson, Tara Spencer-Nairn, Janet Wright	Corner Gas: "Gopher It"	
2007; 22nd Gemini Awards	Roman Danylo, Aurora Browne, Jennifer Goodhue, Albert Howell, Terry McGurrin, Jennifer Robertson, Ian Sirota, Winston Spear, Gavin Stephens	Comedy Inc.	
2007; 22nd Gemini Awards	Christopher Bolton, Stephen Amell, Oliver Becker, Inga Cadranel, Louis Di Bianco, Carlos Diaz, Matt Gordon, Gabriel Hogan, Mayko Nguyen, Pascal Petardi, Joe Pingue, Jeff Pustil, Philip Riccio, Maria Vacratsis, Jeremy Wright	Rent-a-Goalie	
2007; 22nd Gemini Awards	Roger Abbott, Penelope Corrin, Don Ferguson, Luba Goy, Jessica Holmes, Craig Lauzon, Alan Park	Royal Canadian Air Farce	
2007; 22nd Gemini Awards	Cathy Jones, Shaun Majumder, Mark Critch, Gavin Crawford	This Hour Has 22 Minutes	
2007; 22nd Gemini Awards	Rob deLeeuw, Kaela Bahrey, Karen Cliche, Ellen David, Trevor Hayes, Kathleen Robertson, Nobuya Shimamoto, Matt Silver, James A. Woods, Nicolas Wright	The Business: "Check Please"	
2008; 23rd Gemini Awards
2008; 23rd Gemini Awards	Inessa Frantowski, Brooks Gray, Andy King, Rebecca McMahon, Leo Scherman, Morgan Waters	Cock'd Gunns: "A Taste of Success"	
2008; 23rd Gemini Awards	Fab Filippo, David Alpay, Jennifer Baxter, Mike Beaver, Robin Brûlé, Jayne Eastwood, Ennis Esmer, Brandon Firla, Ron Gabriel, Peter Keleghan, Arnold Pinnock, Aron Tager	Billable Hours: "Monopoly Man"	
2008; 23rd Gemini Awards	John Catucci, David Mesiano	Canadian Comedy Awards: Best of the Fest 2007	
2008; 23rd Gemini Awards	Stephen Amell, Oliver Becker, Michael Bodnar, Christopher Bolton, Sarain Boylan, Inga Cadranel, Louis Di Bianco, Carlos Diaz, Matt Gordon, Gabriel Hogan, Mayko Nguyen, Pascal Petardi, Joe Pingue, Jeff Pustil, Philip Riccio, Maria Vacratsis, Jeremy Wright	Rent-a-Goalie: "Domi Daze"	
2008; 23rd Gemini Awards	Mark Critch, Gavin Crawford, Geri Hall, Cathy Jones	This Hour Has 22 Minutes	
2009; 24th Gemini Awards
2009; 24th Gemini Awards	Steve Cochrane, Kevin Ellis, George Komorowski, Adriana Maggs, Joel Stewart, Steven Morana, Paul Snepsts, Jordan McCloskey, Phyllis Ellis	Three Chords from the Truth: "Tommy's Label Showcase"	
2009; 24th Gemini Awards	Fab Filippo, Jennifer Baxter, Mike Beaver, Robin Brûlé, Jayne Eastwood, Brandon Firla, Ron Gabriel, Peter Keleghan, Arnold Pinnock, Aron Tager	Billable Hours: "A Manson for All Seasons"	
2009; 24th Gemini Awards	Ordena Stephens, Trey Anthony, Daniel J. Gordon, Eli Goree, Ngozi Paul	Da Kink in My Hair: "Black Cake, White Cake"	
2009; 24th Gemini Awards	Oliver Becker, Michael Bodnar, Christopher Bolton, Sarain Boylan, Inga Cadranel, Louis Di Bianco, Carlos Diaz, Mark-Cameron Fraser, Matt Gordon, Gabriel Hogan, Mayko Nguyen, Pascal Petardi, Joe Pingue, Jeff Pustil, Simon Reynolds, Philip Riccio, Maria Vacratsis, Jeremy Wright	Rent-a-Goalie: "Ham in a Pram"	
2009; 24th Gemini Awards	Shaun Majumder, Gavin Crawford, Mark Critch, Geri Hall, Cathy Jones	This Hour Has 22 Minutes	
2010; 25th Gemini Awards
2010; 25th Gemini Awards	Shaun Majumder, Gavin Crawford, Mark Critch, Geri Hall, Cathy Jones	This Hour Has 22 Minutes	
2010; 25th Gemini Awards	Kenny Hotz, Spencer Rice	Kenny vs. Spenny: "Who Can 69 the Longest?"	
2010; 25th Gemini Awards	Peter Keleghan, Erin Agostino, Carl Alacchi, Angela Asher, Ellen David, Stacey Farber, Alain Goulem, Kaniehtiio Horn, Jesse Rath, Michael Seater, Arielle Shiri	18 to Life: "Goy Story"	
2011; 26th Gemini Awards
2011; 26th Gemini Awards	Alex House, Maggie Castle, Angela Jill Guingcangco, Chris Leavins, Melanie Leishman, Jason Mewes, Bill Turnbull	Todd and the Book of Pure Evil: "The Phantom of Crowley High"	
2011; 26th Gemini Awards	Gavin Crawford, Mark Critch, Geri Hall, Cathy Jones	This Hour Has 22 Minutes	
2011; 26th Gemini Awards	Peter Keleghan, Erin Agostino, Carl Alacchi, Angela Asher, Ellen David, Stacey Farber, Alain Goulem, Kaniehtiio Horn, Jesse Rath, Michael Seater, Arielle Shiri	18 to Life: "Family Portrait"	
2011; 26th Gemini Awards	Jason Priestley, Joanna Cassidy, Tracy Dawson, Phyllis Ellis, Ernie Grunwald, Peter MacNeill, Husein Madhavji, Kathleen Munroe, Brooke Nevin, Shaun Shetty, Donavon Stinson	Call Me Fitz: "Long Con Silver"	

=== 2024-present ===
Year	Actors	Series	Ref
2024; 12th Canadian Screen Awards
2024; 12th Canadian Screen Awards	Jared Keeso, Nathan Dales, Michelle Mylett, K. Trevor Wilson, Dylan Playfair, Andrew Herr, Tyler Johnston, Evan Stern, Jacob Tierney, Mark Forward, Lisa Codrington, Kaniehtiio Horn	Letterkenny	
2024; 12th Canadian Screen Awards	Lyndie Greenwood, Chris Sandiford, Dakota Ray Hebert, Paul Braunstein, Taylor Love, Robin Duke, Varun Saranga, Paloma Nuñez	Shelved	
2024; 12th Canadian Screen Awards	Zoe Lister-Jones, Tymika Tafari, Amar Chadha-Patel	Slip	
2024; 12th Canadian Screen Awards	Paul Rabliauskas, Roseanne Supernault, Billy Merasty, Gabriel Daniels, Avery Sutherland, Cheyenna Sapp, Tina Keeper	Acting Good	
2024; 12th Canadian Screen Awards	Catherine Reitman, Dani Kind, Jessalyn Wanlim, Enuka Okuma, Sarah McVie, Sadie Munroe	Workin' Moms	
2025; 13th Canadian Screen Awards
2025; 13th Canadian Screen Awards	Meaghan Rath, Aaron Abrams, Logan Nicholson, Mikayla SwamiNathan, Ennis Esmer, Nazneen Contractor, Veena Sood, Dmitry Chepovetsky, Lisa Codrington	Children Ruin Everything	
2025; 13th Canadian Screen Awards	D.J. Demers, Geri Hall, Elise Bauman, Dan Beirne, Seran Sathiyaseelan, Dayton Sinkia, Maddy Foley	One More Time	
2025; 13th Canadian Screen Awards	Jared Keeso, Nathan Dales, Michelle Mylett, K. Trevor Wilson, Dylan Playfair, Andrew Herr, Tyler Johnston, Evan Stern, Jacob Tierney, Dan Petronijevic, Mark Forward, Lisa Codrington, Kamilla Kowal, Kaniehtiio Horn	Letterkenny	
2025; 13th Canadian Screen Awards	Andrew Phung, Rakhee Morzaria, Zoriah Wong, Roman Pesino, Ali Hassan, Julie Nolke, Chris Locke, Kimberly-Ann Truong	Run the Burbs	
2025; 13th Canadian Screen Awards	Robb Wells, Anastasia Phillips, Jennifer Spence, Dan Petronijevic, Raoul Bhaneja, Enrico Colantoni, Jesse Camacho, Brandon Oakes, Susan Kent, Jason Daley, Patrick McKenna	The Trades	
2026; 14th Canadian Screen Awards
2026; 14th Canadian Screen Awards	Anna Lambe, Maika Harper, Braeden Clarke, Zorga Qaunaq, Jay Ryan	North of North	
2026; 14th Canadian Screen Awards	Jermaine Richards, Trevaunn Richards, Heather Gallant, Lucas Lopez, Hassan Phills, Michael Charles, Solomon Kehinde, Danny Martinello, Zachariah Hamed	The Office Movers	
2026; 14th Canadian Screen Awards	Meredith MacNeill, Jennifer Whalen, Leslie Adlam, Jeanne Beker, Tricia Black, Paul Braunstein, Georgie Murphy, Alexander Nunez, Gord Rand, Kevin Whalen	Small Achievable Goals	
2026; 14th Canadian Screen Awards	Robb Wells, Anastasia Phillips, Jennifer Spence, Jennifer Irwin, Dan Petronijevic, Raoul Bhaneja, Enrico Colantoni, Jesse Camacho, Brandon Oakes, Susan Kent, Jason Daley, Patrick McKenna, Dave Lawrence, Aaron Poole, Jordan Poole	The Trades	
