= Gemini Award for Best Performance in a Comedy Program or Series, Individual or Ensemble =

Discontinued annual Canadian media award

The Gemini Award for Best Performance in a Comedy Program or Series (Individual or Ensemble) is a defunct award category, presented by the Academy of Canadian Cinema and Television from 1992 to 2000 as part of its Gemini Awards program.

When the Gemini Awards were first introduced in 1986, awards were presented for Best Actor in a Comedy Series and Best Actress in a Comedy Series. However, as Canadian television comedy was dominated in that era primarily by sketch comedy, comedy-drama or stand-up performance shows, rather than traditional sitcoms, comedy performance categories were discontinued after the 2nd Gemini Awards in 1987; for the next few years, performances in comedy-drama shows were eligible to be nominated in the drama performance categories, while sketch comedy performers could be nominated for Best Performance in a Variety or Performing Arts Program or Series.

Beginning with the 6th Gemini Awards in 1992, the Academy introduced a single award for Best Performance in a Comedy Program or Series, whose winners or nominees could be either an individual or an ensemble; however, the award was almost always won by an ensemble, with the cast of the sketch comedy series This Hour Has 22 Minutes winning it five of the ten times it was presented. Separate awards for individual performance and ensemble performance were then introduced for the 16th Gemini Awards in 2001.

After 2010, with the reemergence of scripted comedy series in Canadian television, separate categories for Best Actor in a Comedy Series and Best Actress in a Comedy Series were reintroduced, alongside new categories for Best Supporting Actor in a Comedy Series and Best Supporting Actress in a Comedy Series, as of the 26th Gemini Awards in 2011. Since 2012, all four of the separate categories have continued to be presented as part of the contemporary Canadian Screen Awards.

== Winners and nominees ==
| Year | Actor | Series | Ref |
|---|---|---|---|
1992; 6th Gemini Awards
| 1992; 6th Gemini Awards | Sandra Shamas | Adrienne Clarkson Presents: "Spitting Nickels" | |
| 1992; 6th Gemini Awards | George Buza | Maniac Mansion | |
| 1992; 6th Gemini Awards | Dave Foley, Bruce McCulloch, Kevin McDonald, Mark McKinney, Scott Thompson | The Kids in the Hall | |
| 1992; 6th Gemini Awards | Tommy Sexton, Greg Malone, Cathy Jones, Mary Walsh, Andy Jones | CODCO | |
1993; 7th Gemini Awards
| 1993; 7th Gemini Awards | Dave Foley, Bruce McCulloch, Kevin McDonald, Mark McKinney, Scott Thompson | The Kids in the Hall | |
| 1993; 7th Gemini Awards | Mike MacDonald | My House, My Rules | |
| 1993; 7th Gemini Awards | Radio Free Vestibule | Just for Laughs | |
1994; 8th Gemini Awards
| 1994; 8th Gemini Awards | Tommy Sexton, Greg Malone, Cathy Jones, Mary Walsh | CODCO | |
| 1994; 8th Gemini Awards | Luba Goy, Roger Abbott, Don Ferguson, John Morgan | 1992: Year of the Farce | |
| 1994; 8th Gemini Awards | Dave Foley, Bruce McCulloch, Kevin McDonald, Mark McKinney, Scott Thompson | The Kids in the Hall | |
| 1994; 8th Gemini Awards | Steve Smith | The Red Green Show | |
1995; 9th Gemini Awards
| 1995; 9th Gemini Awards | Greg Thomey, Mary Walsh, Cathy Jones, Rick Mercer | This Hour Has 22 Minutes | |
| 1995; 9th Gemini Awards | Luba Goy, Roger Abbott, Don Ferguson, John Morgan | Royal Canadian Air Farce | |
| 1995; 9th Gemini Awards | Dan Redican | The Dan Redican Comedy Hour | |
| 1995; 9th Gemini Awards | Tim Steeves | Comics! | |
1996; 10th Gemini Awards
| 1996; 10th Gemini Awards | Greg Thomey, Mary Walsh, Cathy Jones, Rick Mercer | This Hour Has 22 Minutes | |
| 1996; 10th Gemini Awards | Dave Foley, Bruce McCulloch, Kevin McDonald, Mark McKinney, Scott Thompson | The Kids in the Hall | |
| 1996; 10th Gemini Awards | Luba Goy, Roger Abbott, Don Ferguson, John Morgan | Royal Canadian Air Farce | |
| 1996; 10th Gemini Awards | Karen Hines, Wayne Flemming, Jeremy Hotz, Mark Farrell, Ken Finkleman, Rosemary Radcliffe, Robert Cait, Angela Asher | Married Life | |
| 1996; 10th Gemini Awards | Patrick McKenna | The Red Green Show | |
1997; 11th Gemini Awards
| 1997; 11th Gemini Awards | Greg Thomey, Mary Walsh, Cathy Jones, Rick Mercer | This Hour Has 22 Minutes | |
| 1997; 11th Gemini Awards | Luba Goy, Roger Abbott, Don Ferguson, John Morgan | Royal Canadian Air Farce | |
| 1997; 11th Gemini Awards | Russell Peters | Comics! | |
| 1997; 11th Gemini Awards | Steve Smith | The Red Green Show | |
| 1997; 11th Gemini Awards | Shawn Thompson | One Minute to Air | |
1998 (1); 12th Gemini Awards
| 1998 (1); 12th Gemini Awards | Ken Finkleman, Tanya Allen, Mark Farrell, Jeremy Hotz, Peter Keleghan | The Newsroom: "The Campaign" | |
| 1998 (1); 12th Gemini Awards | Dave Broadfoot | Dave Broadfoot: Old Enough To Say What I Want | |
| 1998 (1); 12th Gemini Awards | Luba Goy, Roger Abbott, Don Ferguson, John Morgan | Royal Canadian Air Farce | |
| 1998 (1); 12th Gemini Awards | John Rogers | Comedy Now! | |
| 1998 (1); 12th Gemini Awards | Greg Thomey, Mary Walsh, Cathy Jones, Rick Mercer | This Hour Has 22 Minutes | |
1998 (2); 13th Gemini Awards
| 1998 (2); 13th Gemini Awards | Patrick McKenna, Steve Smith | The Red Green Show | |
| 1998 (2); 13th Gemini Awards | Brent Butt | Comedy Now! | |
| 1998 (2); 13th Gemini Awards | Luba Goy, Roger Abbott, Don Ferguson, John Morgan | Royal Canadian Air Farce | |
| 1998 (2); 13th Gemini Awards | Ellie Harvie | The Improv Comedy Olympics | |
| 1998 (2); 13th Gemini Awards | Ronnie Edwards, Kedar Brown, Kenny Robinson, Satori Shakoor | Thick and Thin | |
| 1998 (2); 13th Gemini Awards | Greg Thomey, Mary Walsh, Cathy Jones, Rick Mercer | This Hour Has 22 Minutes | |
1999; 14th Gemini Awards
| 1999; 14th Gemini Awards | Greg Thomey, Mary Walsh, Cathy Jones, Rick Mercer | This Hour Has 22 Minutes | |
| 1999; 14th Gemini Awards | Tom Green | The Tom Green Show | |
| 1999; 14th Gemini Awards | Shaun Majumder | Comedy Now! | |
| 1999; 14th Gemini Awards | Leah Pinsent, Peter Keleghan, Dan Lett, Rick Mercer | Made in Canada: "A Death in the Family" | |
| 1999; 14th Gemini Awards | Bob Robertson, Linda Cullen | Double Exposure | |
2000; 15th Gemini Awards
| 2000; 15th Gemini Awards | Greg Thomey, Mary Walsh, Cathy Jones, Rick Mercer | This Hour Has 22 Minutes | |
| 2000; 15th Gemini Awards | Dave Broadfoot | David Broadfoot: Old Dog, New Tricks | |
| 2000; 15th Gemini Awards | Gavin Crawford | Comedy Now! | |
| 2000; 15th Gemini Awards | Patrick McKenna, Jerry Schaefer, Wayne Robson, Steve Smith, Peter Keleghan, Bob Bainborough, Jeff Lumby, Joel Harris, Graham Greene | The Red Green Show | |
| 2000; 15th Gemini Awards | Harland Williams | Comedy Now! | |
