= The Air Farce Comedy Album =

Studio album by Royal Canadian Air Farce
- Released: 1979
- Recorded: August 23 and 24, 1978
- Genre: Comedy
- Label: CBC Enterprises

Royal Canadian Air Farce chronology
The Air Farce Comedy Album (1979)	Air Farce Live (1983)

The Air Farce Comedy Album is a comedy album performed by the Royal Canadian Air Farce comedy troupe, released in 1979. The sketches were performed in CBC's Studio 4 over a two-day period on August 23 and 24, 1978. The never-before-performed sketches were performed in front of a live audience, allowing for spontaneous reaction.

The album was the winner of the Juno Award for Comedy Album of the Year at the Juno Awards of 1979.

== Track listing ==
1. "Dinner by Candlelight" – 1:35
2. "Sex Therapy Furnace" – 3:37
3. "Flaw in the Law" – 1:41
4. "Shakespearean Quackers" – 5:15
5. "Amy's Tea Kettle" – 2:15
6. "What Is a Canadian?" – 2:29
7. "Theatrical Hijack" – 7:08
8. "Intelligence Experiment" – 1:21
9. "Pay"-Tel City" – 2:08
10. "Canada Is..." – 2:40
11. "News from Baggleyburg" – 5:11
12. "Sports: Bobby Clobber" – 4:49
13. "Stay Fresh Mini Cars" – 1:22
14. "Sergeant Renfrew: Limbo" – 4:32

== Personnel ==
- Roger Abbott
- Dave Broadfoot
- Don Ferguson
- Luba Goy
- John Morgan
