= 9th Canadian Comedy Awards =

Festival and awards ceremony for works of 2007

- Date: 5 October 2008
- Location: Casino Regina; Regina, Saskatchewan
- Country: Canada
- Presented by: Canadian Comedy Foundation for Excellence
- Hosted by: Alan Park

Highlights
- Most wins: Television: This Hour Has 22 Minutes (3); Film: Juno (2); Person: Gavin Crawford, Gerry Dee, Geri Hall, Seth Rogen (2)
- Most nominations: Television: Corner Gas (9); Film: Dark Rising (6); Person: Michael Cera and Seth Rogen (3)
- Website: www.canadiancomedyawards.org

The 9th Canadian Comedy Awards, presented by the Canadian Comedy Foundation for Excellence (CCFE), honoured the best live, television, film, and Internet comedy of 2007. The ceremony was held on 5 October 2008 in Regina, Saskatchewan. The ceremony was hosted by Alan Park.

Canadian Comedy Awards, also known as Beavers, were awarded in 24 categories. This included the first public-voting categories and the first awards recognizing Internet content. The awards ceremony concluded the five-day Canadian Comedy Awards Festival which showcased performances by over 100 comic artists. A Best of the Fest special was broadcast by The Comedy Network.

For a third consecutive year TV series Corner Gas led the nominations with nine, followed by the film Dark Rising with six. However, neither of these works won a Beaver. Seth Rogen and Michael Cera led the nominations amongst people with three. This Hour Has 22 Minutes won three Beavers followed by a number of artists and projects that received two, including Gavin Crawford, Gerry Dee, Geri Hall, Seth Rogen, and the films Juno and Superbad.

== Festival and ceremony ==
The 9th Canadian Comedy Awards and Festival ran from 1 to 5 October 2008 in Regina, Saskatchewan. The province and city had provided $200,000 in funding to relocate the festival from London, Ontario. Fourteen shows were held in Regina, showcasing the talents of more than 100 comedic performers. The awards were also sponsored by The Comedy Network which compiled and broadcast the Best of the Fest television special, hosted by Gerry Dee. The awards ceremony was hosted by Alan Park at Casino Regina.

== Winners and nominees ==
The Awards were expanded from 20 to 24 categories this year, including three public-voting categories: best radio program or clip, best web clip, and Canadian Comedy Person of the Year. Winners of public-voting categories were chosen by Canadian residents through an online poll.

The film Juno had been controversially excluded from Canada's industry-driven Genie Awards. Although it had a Canadian director, lead actors, crew, and had been filmed in Canada, U.S. financing disqualified it from competition. The Canadian Comedy Awards, however, were artist-driven with a mandate "To recognize and celebrate Canadian achievements in comedy at home and abroad" and awarded the film two Beavers.

Winners are listed first and highlighted in boldface:

=== Multimedia ===
Canadian Comedy Person of the Year	Best Radio Program or Clip
**Seth Rogen**; Rick Mercer; Michael Cera; Elliot Page (Note: Credited as Ellen Page); Russell Peters	**Bad Santa, Q107**; 300 Personal Trainer, 106.9 The Bear, Ottawa; The Debaters, CBC Radio One

=== Live ===
Best Stand-up, Large Venue	Best Stand-up Newcomer
**Russell Peters**; Jeremy Hotz; Derek Edwards; Ron James; Shaun Majumder	**Peter Anthony**; Sam Easton; DeAnne Smith; Nick Beaton; Sean Lacomber
Best Male Stand-up	Best Female Stand-up
**Gerry Dee**; Seán Cullen; Steve Patterson; Kenny Robinson; John Wing Jr.	**Nikki Payne**; Laurie Elliott; Jennifer Grant; Shannon Laverty; Erica Sigurdson
Best Male Improviser	Best Female Improviser
**Dan Joffre**; Taz VanRassel; Jayden Pfeifer; Doug Morency; Toby Berner	**Aurora Browne**; Lisa Merchant; Diana Frances; Amy Matysio; Jamillah Ross
Best Sketch Troupe or Company	Best Improv Troupe or Company
**Canadian Content**; The Imponderables; Picnicface; The Second City; The Sketchersons	**Show Stopping Number**; About An Hour; Urban Improv; General Fools Improvisational Theatre; Monkey Toast: The Improvised Talk Show
Best One Person Show	Best Comedic Play, Revue or Series
**The Sean Schau!**; Scarfarce; The One Man Harold; The Newsdesk with Ron Sparks; All the Rage	**Facebook of Revelations**; PET3RS – Approximately 3 Peters; Dreadwood: Stories of the Canadian Klondike; The Dead Language of Love; An Inconvenient Musical
Best Taped Live Performance
**Gerry Dee** – **Just For Laughs 2007 Gala** show 12; The Doo Wops – Canadian Comedy Awards 2007: Best of the Fest; Manolis Zontanos – Comedy Network Presents; Steve Patterson – Halifax Comedy Fest 2007; Mike MacDonald – Halifax Comedy Fest 2007

=== Television ===
Best Performance by a Male	Best Performance by a Female
**Gavin Crawford** – **This Hour Has 22 Minutes**; Jon Dore – The Jon Dore Television Show; Alan Park – Royal Canadian Air Farce; Christopher Bolton – Rent-A-Goalie; Eric Peterson – Corner Gas	**Geri Hall** – **This Hour Has 22 Minutes**; Janet Wright – Corner Gas; Nancy Robertson – Corner Gas; Cathy Jones – This Hour Has 22 Minutes; Penelope Corrin – Air Farce Live
Best Direction in a Series	Best Direction in a Special or Episode
**Henry Sarwer-Foner** – **Rick Mercer Report**; Michael Kennedy – Little Mosque on the Prairie; David Storey, Robert de Lint, Brent Butt, Don McCutheon, Jeff Beesley – Corner Gas; Carl Harvey and Shelagh O'Brien – 2007 Just For Laughs Gala Series; Vivieno Caldinelli – Hotbox: "The Owl and the Man"	**Samir Rehem** – **Cock'd Gunns**, episode 8; Brent Butt – Corner Gas – "The Accidental Cleanist"; David Storey – Corner Gas – "Cable Excess"; Don McCutcheon – Corner Gas – "The 'J' Word"; James Allodi – Rent-A-Goalie – "Burlington"
Best Writing in a Series	Best Writing in a Special or Episode
**Jon Dore, Mark Forward, Steve Dylan** – **The Jon Dore Television Show**; Leo Scherman, Morgan Waters, Andy King, Brooks Gray – Cock'd Gunns; Zarqa Nawaz, Rebecca Schechter, Al Rae, Rob Sheridan, Greg Eckler, Paul Mather, Miles Smith – Little Mosque on the Prairie; Kevin White, Mark Farrell, Brent Butt, Andrew Carr, Norm Hiscock, Gary Pearson, Dylan Wertz – Corner Gas; Pat Thornton – The Owl and the Man	**Mark Critch, Gavin Crawford, Gary Pearson, Kyle Tingley, Jennifer Whalen, Albert Howell, Tim McAuliffe, Nathan Fielder, Geri Hall, Andrew Bush, Dean Jenkinson** – **This Hour Has 22 Minutes**, episode 3; Rob Sheridan – Little Mosque on the Prairie – episode 213 "Public Access"; Graeme Manson – Rent-A-Goalie – episode 5 – "Everybody's a Fag"; David Moses – Robson Arms – season 3, episode 303, "Geeks In Love"; Kevin White – Corner Gas – "Bed and Brake Fast"

=== Film ===
Best Performance by a Male	Best Performance by a Female
**Michael Cera** – **Superbad**; Jay Reso – Dark Rising; Landy Cannon – Dark Rising; Seth Rogen – Knocked Up; Michael Cera – Juno	**Elliot Page** – **Juno**; Brigitte Kingsley – Dark Rising; Julia Schneider – Dark Rising
Best Direction	Best Writing
**Jason Reitman** – **Juno**; Andrew Cymek – Dark Rising; James Dunnison – Walk the Dog	**Seth Rogen** – **Superbad**; Andrew Cymek – Dark Rising

=== Internet ===
Best Web Clip
- **Sure Lock: A True Poo Story**
- Cerealized #28: Loops
- Every Dave Life
- The Owl and the Man #1
- Powerthirst
- The Waldo Ultimatum (Note: "The Waldo Ultimatum" is a sketch by the Imponderables.)

=== Special awards ===
Chairman's Award	Dave Broadfoot Award
**Briane Nasimok**; **Rob McLean**	**Jeremy Hotz**

== Most wins ==
The following people, shows, films, etc. received multiple awards

Awards	Person or work
3	This Hour Has 22 Minutes
2	Gavin Crawford
2	Gerry Dee
2	Geri Hall
2	Seth Rogen
2	Superbad

== Most nominations ==
The following people, shows, films, etc. received multiple nominations

Nominations	Person or work
9	Corner Gas
6	Dark Rising
4	This Hour Has 22 Minutes
3	Juno
3	Little Mosque on the Prairie
3	Michael Cera
3	Rent-A-Goalie
3	Seth Rogen
2	Cock'd Gunns
2	Gavin Crawford
2	Gerry Dee
2	Geri Hall
2	The Jon Dore Television Show
2	The Owl and the Man
2	Superbad
