= 8th Canadian Comedy Awards =

Festival and awards ceremony for works of 2006

- Date: 12 October 2007
- Location: London Music Hall Complex; London, Ontario
- Country: Canada
- Presented by: Canadian Comedy Foundation for Excellence
- Hosted by: Ryan Belleville

Highlights
- Most wins: Television: Corner Gas and Rent-A-Goalie (2); Film: Bon Cop, Bad Cop (3); Person: Alan Park (2)
- Most nominations: Television: Corner Gas (6); Film: Bon Cop, Bad Cop (4); Person: Alan Park (4)
- Website: www.canadiancomedyawards.org

The 8th Canadian Comedy Awards, presented by the Canadian Comedy Foundation for Excellence (CCFE), honoured the best live, television, and film comedy of 2006 and was held on 12 October 2007 in London, Ontario. The ceremony was hosted by Ryan Belleville.

Canadian Comedy Awards, also known as Beavers, were awarded in 20 categories. Winners were picked by members of ACTRA (Alliance of Canadian Cinema, Television and Radio Artists), the Canadian Actors' Equity Association, the Writers Guild of Canada, the Directors Guild of Canada, and the Comedy Association. The ceremony was held during the five-day Canadian Comedy Awards Festival which showcased performances by the nominees and other artists. Two variety specials were taped and broadcast by The Comedy Network.

TV series Corner Gas led with six nominations followed by Royal Canadian Air Farce with five, the film Bon Cop, Bad Cop and Alan Park with four. Bon Cop, Bad Cop received the most Beavers with, followed by Corner Gas, Rent-A-Goalie, and Alan Park with two each.

== Festival ==
The 8th Canadian Comedy Awards and Festival ran from 9 to 13 October 2007 in London, Ontario, its fifth and final year in the city. Each day featured talent showcases by local comics, nominees and other visiting performers.

Two variety specials taped at the festival were aired on The Comedy Network. The Doo Wops – John Catucci and David Mesiano – were nominated for a Gemini Award for Best Ensemble Performance in a Comedy Program for Canadian Comedy Awards 2007: Best of the Fest.

== Ceremony ==
The 8th Canadian Comedy Awards ceremony was held on 12 October 2007, hosted by Ryan Belleville. Beavers were awarded in 20 categories covering live performance, television and film.

== Winners and nominees ==
Winners were voted on by members of ACTRA (Alliance of Canadian Cinema, Television and Radio Artists), the Canadian Actors' Equity Association, the Writers Guild of Canada, the Directors Guild of Canada, and the Comedy Association.

Nominees, chosen by juries, were announced on 25 July 2007. Voting was open from 15 August to 15 September. Nominees must have been Canadian, or been born in Canada or landed immigrants, or have done the bulk of their work in Canada.

Winners are listed first and highlighted in boldface:

=== Live ===
Best Taped Live Performance	Best Stand-up Newcomer
**Tim Nutt** – **Just For Laughs**; Alan Park – Just For Laughs; Pete Zedlacher – Just For Laughs; Shaun Majumder – Just For Laughs; Winston Spear – Just For Laughs	**Jeff McEnery**; Darrin Rose; Don Wood; Graham Clark; Sean Lacomber
Best Male Stand-up	Best Female Stand-up
**Mike Wilmot**; Alan Park; Gerry Dee; Peter Kelamis; Steve Patterson	**Debra DiGiovanni**; Erica Sigurdson; Kate Davis; Kristeen von Hagen; Nikki Payne
Best Male Improviser	Best Female Improviser
**Drew McCreadie**; Adam Cawley; Ian Boothby; Peter Oldring; Taz VanRassel	**Lauren Ash**; Diana Frances; Ellie Harvie; Jan Caruana; Jennifer Goodhue
Best Sketch Troupe or Company	Best Improv Troupe or Company
**The Sketchersons**; Canadian Content; The Distractions; The Imponderables; The Second City: cast of Bird Flu Over the Cuckoo's Nest	**Illustrated Men**; AKA Improv: Cage Match Vancouver; Monkey Toast: The Improvised Talk Show; Rock Paper Scissors; Urban Improv
Best One Person Show	Best Comedic Play, Revue or Series
**Hard Headed Woman** (Note: Hard Headed Woman is the one person show by Sandra Battaglini.); Any Second Now; Comedy in Motion with Bob Cates; Swiss Family Guy Robinson; The Sean Schau!	**Plan Live From Outer Space**; For Crying Out Loud; My First Crush – From Fear to Non Confidence; Swiss Family Guy Robinson; Whatever Happened to Bergin and Bublick?

=== Television ===
Best Performance by a Male	Best Performance by a Female
**Eric Peterson** – **Corner Gas**; Pat Thornton – Punched Up; Christopher Bolton – Rent-A-Goalie; Alan Park – Royal Canadian Air Farce; Shaun Majumder – This Hour Has 22 Minutes	**Inga Cadranel – Rent-A-Goalie**; Jennifer Goodhue – Comedy Inc.; Sheila McCarthy – Little Mosque on the Prairie; Jessica Holmes – Royal Canadian Air Farce; Penelope Corrin – Royal Canadian Air Farce
Best Direction in a Series	Best Direction in a Special or episode
**T. W. Peacocke** – **Rent-A-Goalie**; David Storey, Robert de Lint, Jeff Beesley, Mark Farrell, Brent Butt – Corner Gas; Carl Harvey – Just For Laughs 2006; Michael Kennedy – Little Mosque on the Prairie; Henry Sarwer-Foner – Rick Mercer Report	**Henry Sarwer-Foner** – **Rick Mercer Report**, episode 16; Robert de Lint – Corner Gas – "The Good Old Table Hockey Game"; Stephen Reynolds – This Hour Has 22 Minutes – episode #14.3; Michael Kennedy – This Space for Rent – "Stained"; Deborah Day – Women Fully Clothed
Best Writing in a Series	Best Writing in a Special or episode
**Brent Butt, Mark Farrell, Paul Mather, Kevin White, Andrew Carr, Robert Sheridan** – **Corner Gas**; Zarqa Nawaz, Al Rae, Susan Flanders-Alexander, Dan Redican, Rebecca Schechter, Jackie May – Little Mosque on the Prairie; Jeremy Diamond, Tim Polley – Odd Job Jack; Christopher Bolton, Graeme Manson – Rent-A-Goalie; Craig Lauzon – Royal Canadian Air Farce	**Kevin White, Mark Critch, Gary Pearson, Gavin Crawford, Jennifer Whalen, Dave Nystrom, Carolyn Taylor, Albert Howell** – **This Hour Has 22 Minutes**, season XIV, episode 3; Brent Butt – Corner Gas – "Kid Stuff"; Brent Butt, Kevin White – Corner Gas – "Outside Joke"; Chas Lawther, Gail Kerbel – Is It Art?; Alan Park, Rob Ross – Royal Canadian Air Farce

=== Film ===
Best Performance by a Male	Best Performance by a Female
**Patrick Huard** – **Bon Cop, Bad Cop**; Colm Feore – Bon Cop, Bad Cop; Winston Rekert – Breakdown; Dan Redican – If I See Randy Again, Do You Want Me to Hit Him with the Axe?	**Amanda Tapping** – **Breakdown**; Lisa Wegner – Boundless; Catherine O'Hara – For Your Consideration
Best Direction	Best Writing
**Érik Canuel** – **Bon Cop, Bad Cop**; John Bolton – Breakdown; Vivieno Caldinelli – If I See Randy Again, Do You Want Me to Hit Him with the Axe?	**Patrick Huard, Leila Basen, Kevin Tierney, Alex Epstein** – **Bon Cop, Bad Cop**; John Bolton – Breakdown; Winston Spear, Vivieno Caldinelli – If I See Randy Again, Do You Want Me to Hit Him with the Axe?

=== Special awards ===
Chairman's Award	Dave Broadfoot Award
**Cass Beyley**	**Russell Peters**

== Most wins ==
The following people, shows, films, etc. received multiple awards

Awards	Person or work
3	Bon Cop, Bad Cop
2	Alan Park
2	Corner Gas
2	Rent-A-Goalie

== Most nominations ==
The following people, shows, films, etc. received multiple nominations.

Nominations	Person or work
6	Corner Gas
5	Royal Canadian Air Farce
4	Alan Park
4	Bon Cop, Bad Cop
3	Breakdown
3	If I See Randy Again, Do You Want Me to Hit Him with the Axe?
2	Little Mosque on the Prairie
