= Krazy House =

- Genre: Comedy
- Theme music composer: Ben McPeek
- Country of origin: Canada
- Original language: English
- No. of seasons: 1

Production
- Executive producer: Alan Ehrlich
- Running time: 30 minutes

Original release
- Network: CBC Television
- Release: 12 January – 23 February 1977

Krazy House is a Canadian television comedy miniseries that aired on CBC Television in 1977. It is an anthology series of several different sketch programmes independently written, performed and produced by different performers in different cities. Members of the Royal Canadian Air Farce were involved in writing and performing in Toronto-shot episodes 1, 2 and 5 (though Dave Broadfoot and Luba Goy were the only Air Farce members to appear on-screen), while episodes 3 and 4 were shot in Vancouver and featured the cast of CBC Radio's Dr. Bundolo's Pandemonium Medicine Show. Episode 6 featured a cast of unknowns, and was not connected to either the Air Farce or Bundolo troupes.

Twenty-one years later, Air Farce members Roger Abbott and Don Ferguson would create and produce a similar sketch-based anthology series: the 1998/99 CBC show SketchCom.

== Scheduling ==
This half-hour series was broadcast Wednesdays at 10:30 p.m. (Eastern) from 12 January to 23 February 1977.

== Episodes ==
- 12 and 19 January 1977: these episodes of various sketches were created by Royal Canadian Air Farce writers and performers. John Morgan, Dave Broadfoot, Roger Abbott and Don Ferguson were writers; Dave Broadfoot, Heath Lamberts, Elizabeth Shepherd and Billy Van starred. George Bloomfield directed.
- 26 January 1977 and 9 February 1977: these episodes adapted CBC Radio's Dr. Bundolo's Pandemonium Medicine Show; Jeff Groberman and Don Thatchuk writers; produced in Vancouver; starring Bill Buck, Norman Grohman, Bill Reiter with guests Barbara Barsky, Nancy Dolman, Ross Petty and Susan Wright. Don Kowalchuk directed.
- 16 February 1977: "Now Look Here"; John David Morgan writer; starring Heath Lamberts, Billy Van, Luba Goy, Doug Chamberlain, Peggy Mahon, Harvey Atkin, and Charles Kirby. Eric House and Chris Braden directed, Bill Lynn produced.
- 23 February 1977: Jack Sampson producer; Martin Lavut director; Christopher Langham writer

== Reception ==
Ottawa Citizen television critic Keith Ashford, reviewing the first episode to be broadcast on 12 January, blasted the series as "unfunny, uninteresting and shamelessly derivative", noting that a sketch featuring marital counselling was taken from a Monty Python routine. Dennis Braithwaite of The Toronto Star, meanwhile, issued a rave review of the show on 18 February, calling it "as light as a souffle, as brilliant as a diamond", and claiming it was "only rivalled by Global's Second City", then still in its first season on TV. However, reviewing the episode of 23 February, Braithwaite noted that the performers he had earlier praised were all now absent from the series, and that the resulting episode was "awful, terrible, beyond question the worst attempt at humour that even the CBC has ever made."
