= XPM (TV series) =

- Created by: Steven Barwin, Gabriel David Tick
- Starring: Don Ferguson; Kathy Greenwood; Dave Broadfoot
- Country of origin: Canada
- No. of episodes: 2

Production
- Executive producers: Roger Abbott, Don Ferguson, Gabriel David Tick
- Running time: 22 minutes

Original release
- Network: CBC
- Release: February 27, 2004

XPM is a short-lived Canadian television sitcom broadcast in 2004 on CBC Television. It was centred on shamed former Prime Minister Bennett Macdonald, played by Don Ferguson, who was trying to adjust to a life where the best job he could find was at a small law firm in a shopping mall. The series also starred Dave Broadfoot as Macdonald's law partner, Kathy Greenwood as his wife, and Jessica Holmes as his secretary Jasmine.

The series produced just two episodes, which the CBC aired back-to-back as a one-off comedy special on February 27, 2004, after declining to pick up any further episodes. It was created by Steven Barwin and Gabriel David Tick, who were also executive producers along with Don Ferguson and Roger Abbott.
