= Royal Canadian Air Farce (TV series) =

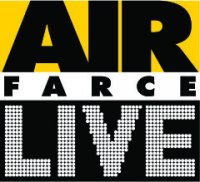
- Genre: Sketch comedy
- Directed by: Perry Rosemond
- Starring: Present : Roger Abbott; Don Ferguson; Luba Goy; Jessica Holmes; Craig Lauzon; Alan Park; Penelope Corrin; See also: Cast history
- Country of origin: Canada
- No. of seasons: 16
- No. of episodes: 335

Production
- Production locations: Canadian Broadcasting Centre; Toronto, Ontario
- Running time: 22–23 Minutes

Original release
- Network: CBC Television
- Release: October 8, 1993 – December 31, 2008

Royal Canadian Air Farce (broadcast as Air Farce Live during 2007, and Air Farce—Final Flight! in 2008), and often credited simply as Air Farce, is a Canadian sketch comedy series starring the comedy troupe Royal Canadian Air Farce, that previously starred in an eponymous show on CBC Radio, from 1973 to 1997. The top-rated television show was broadcast on CBC Television, beginning in 1993 and ending in December 2008. The Air Farce Live name was adopted in October 2007. For the show's final season which began October 3, 2008, the series was renamed Air Farce—Final Flight!

The show was a weekly topical sketch comedy series focusing on political and cultural satire and was one of the most popular Canadian television shows. It was initially aired as a radio series beginning in 1973, and on radio, Air Farce continued for 24 seasons through 1997. In terms of the troupe's TV career, the first Air Farce TV special aired in 1980. A short-lived Air Farce TV series was broadcast in 1981, and further TV specials aired in 1982, 1983, and 1984. After a long hiatus from TV, a 1992 New Year's Eve special for CBC-TV was well received, and a new Air Farce TV series began in October 1993. The TV series was retitled Air Farce Live beginning with the October 6, 2007 broadcast and was the first Canadian sketch comedy series to be broadcast in HD. Despite the name change, the show was broadcast live only in the Atlantic time zone. The other time zones aired the show via tape delay.

In November 1998, original cast members Roger Abbott, Don Ferguson, Luba Goy, and John Morgan received the Governor General's Performing Arts Award for Lifetime Artistic Achievement, Canada's highest honour in the performing arts.

== Cast history ==
The show began as a radio show in 1973, continuing until 1997 when the troupe decided to concentrate on the TV series which began in 1993. Madly Off in All Directions, starring Lorne Elliott, replaced the Air Farce radio show on the CBC schedule. Over that time the Air Farce cast has remained relatively stable, with three of the troupe's five founders remaining with the program for its entire run.

=== Original members ===
- Roger Abbott (1973–2011); died at the age of 64 on March 26, 2011.
- Don Ferguson (1973–2012)
- Luba Goy (1973–2012)
- John Morgan (1973–2001); retired in 2001, died at the age of 74 on November 15, 2004.
- Dave Broadfoot (1973–1988); retired in 1988, occasional "special guest" on the series, his appearances becoming less frequent over time on both the radio and television shows. Appeared on the final episode in the show's final sketch. Died at the age of 90 on November 1, 2016.

=== Additions ===
- Barbara Budd (1984–1991), frequent appearances as a "special guest" on the radio show
- Jessica Holmes (2003–2011)
- Craig Lauzon (2004–2012), supporting member during 2003, became full member in 2004
- Alan Park (2004–2012), supporting member during 2003, became full member in 2004
- Penelope Corrin (2007–2012), filled in during Holmes's maternity leave during the first two months of 2007, returned for the live season finale, joined cast for 2007/2008 season
- Arnold Pinnock (2013), who made a guest appearance in the 2012 New Year's Eve special, but was credited as a member for 2013

== Show history ==
Royal Canadian Air Farce began in 1973 as a radio show on CBC Radio. It became one of the radio network's most popular programs. Based in Toronto, most of their shows were recorded in CBC's Cabbagetown studios; however, as the troupe became more popular, they frequently travelled throughout the country to record their weekly radio broadcasts, which featured a mixture of political and cultural satire.

The Farce troupe recorded a one-hour television special in 1980, which evolved into a ten-week series and two sequel specials. They continued to perform their radio series as the TV series and specials moved forward.

Many of the TV show's sketches were actually performed as "radio sketches"—during filming, Air Farce cast members stood on stage in front of microphones reading from scripts, whilst sound effects technician Alex Sinclair could be seen on stage adding sound effects as needed. Other sketches, some quite elaborate, were acted out in full costume as more traditional television sketches. Despite the decent ratings for the initial special, the TV series was received with somewhat lukewarm reviews and ratings. The Air Farce left television after a special in 1984.

In the early 1980s, Air Farce's summer radio hiatus periods were filled by another comedy troupe, The Frantics, who later moved on to their own TV series, Four on the Floor. Later summer hiatus periods, however, were filled by Ferguson and Abbott playing classic comedy recordings. In the late 1980s, CBC Radio launched another 30-minutes weekly political satire, Double Exposure. Though the programmes were never in direct competition, some found the latter show fresher and edgier.

In 1992, Air Farce took a second plunge into television with 1992: Year of the Farce, a satirical New Year's Eve special. For this and all subsequent TV appearances, the troupe abandoned the idea of performing TV sketches as "radio sketches", and presented their TV work in a traditional TV sketch show format. A ratings smash, the special led the troupe to produce another weekly television series, which debuted in 1993. However, this time the move to television was permanent. The radio series continued alongside the TV show for four seasons until May 1997, when it was discontinued.

The practice of having a New Year's Eve special continued through the show's entire run, and such episodes were typically titled Year of the Farce. Air Farce also frequently had the honour of counting down the seconds before the New Year on CBC, and the show's final episode was itself a New Year's Eve special.

Recurring characters on the TV series included the slow Albertan Mike from Canmore (Morgan) and angry Scot Jock McBile (Morgan), self-righteous movie critic Gilbert Smythe Bite-Me (Abbott), and chain-smoking bingo player Brenda (Goy). Though these characters would occasionally feature in skits of their own, usually they were used at the beginning of the show to deliver a stream of one liner jokes commentating on the news of that week.

The show also featured frequent skits with politicians, who were portrayed as various extreme caricatures of their most infamous personality quirks. Notable re-occurring figures included Prime Minister Jean Chrétien (Abbott), who could barely speak a single sentence of English without committing at least a dozen outlandish pronunciation and grammatical errors, the nasally-voiced Preston Manning (Ferguson) who loved to shout "REFOOOOOOORM!", a screaming, bitchy Sheila Copps (Goy), the tyrannical Lucien Bouchard, the dopey and overly-image conscious Stockwell Day, the strutting, clucking, pompous Joe Clark, and the power-hungry Paul Martin (all Ferguson). Many of the real politicians also made guest appearances on the show, often interacting directly with their parodic counterparts.

However, Colonel "Teresa" Stacy (Ferguson) quickly emerged as the show's most popular character — each time he appeared, Stacy would load up the Chicken Cannon and fire rubber chickens and other assorted projectiles at whomever he deemed the most annoying public figure of the week (or year).

Morgan retired from Air Farce in 2001, and the remaining three members carried on with a rotating stable of guest stars (usually no more than one per episode). Seen frequently as "special guests" from 2001 to 2003 were Rochelle Wilson, Jessica Holmes, Sean Cullen, Peter Keleghan, Janet van de Graaff, James Roussel, Craig Lauzon and Elvira Kurt. Holmes' appearances became more frequent as time went by, especially by the beginning of the 2003–04 season. In December 2003, she officially joined the show, adding celebrity figures such as Paris Hilton and Liza Minnelli, and Canadian politicians such as Belinda Stronach, to the troupe's roster of characters.

Later, in 2005, after a lockout at CBC, Air Farce gained two new cast members, who had previously appeared on the show as recurring guest stars: Alan Park and Craig Lauzon. The addition of these two newcomers brought the total number of performers in the troupe to six.

While the show was widely regarded as a Canadian institution, some critics have felt that the television show's quality has diminished over the past few seasons, especially since the breakdown of the original four-actor quartet. However, it still continued to draw solid ratings each week. On March 30, 2007, the Air Farce celebrated their 300th episode by doing the show on live television (except in Western Canada) for one hour. Roger Abbott and Luba Goy began the broadcast with a brief history of the show, closing with "the scariest three words on television: AIR FARCE LIVE!".

After this experimental episode, CBC announced that the 15th season of the series would be aired live for the entire season, with a name change to Air Farce Live.

The final season retained its live format, but was renamed as Air Farce: Final Flight.

=== End of series ===
Logo for final season of Air Farce

Air Farce remained popular through its radio run and initially as a TV series, but over the years interest in the show began to drop and its ratings fell.

On April 1, 2008, the CBC and Air Farce announced that Air Farce Live would end in the 2008/2009 season. Nine new shows, titled Air Farce—Final Flight! aired from October 3, 2008, to December 5, 2008, with the New Year's Eve special as the tenth show and series finale.

A special feature of the final season of shows was "Air Farce Flashback", featuring a memorable segment from the previous 15 seasons of the Air Farce series. The New Year's Eve Grand Finale featured in the Air Farce Flashback segment highlights from several segments of Air Farce sketches over the years.

The final hour-long episode aired December 31, 2008, at 8:00 PM Eastern Time. It featured special guests Ron MacLean, Peter Mansbridge, and former Air Farce member Dave Broadfoot. The final episode was viewed by over 1.5 million viewers.

=== Specials ===
In December 2009, it was announced that the Air Farce would return for a New Year's Eve 2009 special, featuring the return of most of the original staff (excluding Jessica Holmes, Gord Holtham, and Rick Olsen), guest appearances by Peter Mansbridge, Battle of the Blades winners Jamie Salé and Craig Simpson, and the Dragons of Dragons' Den. The special also featured the successor to the Chicken Cannon, "F-Bombs," which were dropped onto photographs from the top of the atrium of the Canadian Broadcasting Centre.

On December 16–17, 2010, the Royal Canadian Air Farce 2010 New Year special was taped. It aired December 31, 2010. The cast included Jessica Holmes, who returned for the 60 minute show as Yogi Gurt and Celine Dion.

Moved to New Year's Day due to Hockey Night in Canada, the Air Farce Not the New Year's Eve Special aired on January 1, 2012. Jessica Holmes did not return for this special due to a prior commitment. This was the first Air Farce special that did not feature the late Roger Abbott in its cast, who had died earlier in 2011.

In 2017, a Canada Day special aired, in celebration of the 150th anniversary of Confederation, as well as a year-end special. While ratings for the specials remained strong, drawing over a million viewers in 2017 and 2018, the CBC informed the troupe in May 2019 that due to budgetary constraints, the 2019 year-end special would be the final edition in the series, as a farewell show combining new material looking at 2019 in review and archival material from the troupe's past, including clips of deceased members Roger Abbott and John Morgan.

== Sketches ==
=== Recurring sketches ===
Some of the recurring sketches on Air Farce include:

- "Ad Absurdum", where Goy remarks on the terrible commercials aired on Canadian television.
- "Driving with Alan Park", a modified version of "Not the Official Story" where Alan Park is now shown driving in a car instead of in front of his computer.
  - This show aired after the 2005 CBC Lockout
- "A Canadian Moment", featuring the entire cast as regulars in a coffee shop. The sketch always ends with the characters saying their catchphrases ("You got that right" for Ferguson, "You betcha" for Morgan, "Tell me about it" for Goy, "Oh yeah, oh yeah, oh yeah" for Abbott as he pours sugar into his coffee, and "Totally" for Holmes, typically in that order). This was the final sketch in the New Year's Eve grand finale in which the coffee shop owner, played by Broadfoot, closes the donut shop permanently and kicks out the regulars at closing time.
- "Brenda the Bingo Lady", where a middle-aged woman (Goy) vents her opinions about current issues while playing a game of bingo alongside her husband (Abbott). Each sketch often invariably ends with the husband, who is named Sid, winning, despite playing only one bingo card to Brenda's numerous cards.
- "B.S. 2000", where the cast of Air Farce portray various particular Canadian newspeople as they put their spin on the 2000 federal election. At the end of a sketch, they would "poll" the public (another cast member playing an anonymous Canadian) and give its results, the gag being that only one person was polled in the survey (and thus one leader would get 100% of the votes, but on one occasion the person abstained).
- "Chicken Cannon". Although originally a sketch in the early parts of Air Farce on TV meant to satirize the Canadian military (in it, the Canadian military consists of only two people, Colonel "Teresa" Stacy and his assistant, played by Ferguson and Morgan), but as the popularity of the sketch grew, it became an integral part of Air Farce, spawning its own newsroom sketch titled "Chicken Cannon News". Studio audience members or viewers at home nominate or vote for their favourite target along with their choice of ammunition (not necessarily a chicken). The cast picks a winner and fires the Chicken Cannon at the fan-suggested target at the end of the sketch. The fan also wins some form of Air Farce merchandise for having their choice be a Chicken Cannon target. In the "Year of the Farce" episodes, a special version of the Chicken Cannon has the top five targets of the year, with the first four being fired upon by a rubber chicken while the top target being fired as before. Past targets included:
  - Canadian party leaders Jean Chrétien, Stockwell Day, Alexa McDonough, Gilles Duceppe, and Joe Clark, for the 2000 election
  - Olympic figure skating judges, for their part in the scandal that had surrounded Jamie Salé and David Pelletier in the 2002 Winter Olympics
  - George W. Bush and Al Gore, for the scandal that surrounded the 2000 US Presidential Election
  - George W. Bush, Donald Rumsfeld, and Dick Cheney for their involvement in Iraq war
  - Gary Bettman and Bob Goodenow, for the furor that resulted from the 2004–05 NHL lockout
  - Harry Potter
  - Ben Johnson
  - Alexei Yashin
  - Pikachu from Pokémon
  - Ricky Martin
  - Britney Spears
  - Canadian Idol host Ben Mulroney
  - Former mayor of Toronto Mel Lastman for being a "paternal bad boy"
  - Former CEO of Air Canada Robert Milton
  - Then-Ontario Premier Dalton McGuinty
  - Marty McSorley for being suspended after assaulting by hockey stick in 2000, the only known target where Colonel Stacy attacks with hockey stick.
  - Osama bin Laden, for his involvement with the September 11 attacks. Note that this is the only known target where Colonel Stacey loads the Chicken Cannon himself.
  - Paul Martin and Stephen Harper for their unprofessional behaviour over the past year of 2005
  - The Y2K bug
  - Frank and Gordon, animated beavers used as advertising mascots for Bell Canada
  - Then-Canadian Environment Minister Rona Ambrose (for "messing up the environment")
  - Former Edmonton Oiler Chris Pronger for being a "turncoat"
  - Karlheinz Schreiber and Brian Mulroney were a tie in 2007.
  - Joe Biden and Sarah Palin
  - Don Cherry as requested by Ron MacLean when he was a guest in 2008.
  - John Baird
  - Stephen Harper's house (For not turning off his lights during Earth Hour.)
  - Patrick and Jonathan Roy
  - Stephen Harper, Stéphane Dion, Michael Ignatieff, Jack Layton, and Gilles Duceppe for the 2008–2009 Canadian parliamentary dispute.
  - The CBC for cancelling the Air Farce series and for losing the rights to the Hockey Night in Canada theme music to CTV
  - Vladimir Putin and Viktor Yanukovych for trying to meddling 2004 Ukrainian presidential election
  - Slobodan Milosevic
- "Critic At Large", where Gilbert Smythe Bite-Me (Abbott), an entertainment critic, gives negative reviews, and takes regular potshots at the Women's Television Network, describing them as 'a bunch of scrotally-deprived, estrogen-sodden non-males', and 'not just because three of (his) ex-wives work there.'
- "Sister Bessie". Sister Bessie (Holmes) is a Catholic nun commenting on various political topics either in the House of Commons or relating to outside sources like George W. Bush. The issues usually make her angry, causing her network Vision Television to block out any obscenities that she may say during her broadcast.
- "Craig Oliver's 3-Way" (Abbott) talks recent news and events with opinions from three other panel members.
- "Dave the Cabbie", where Dave (Ferguson), a cab driver, takes on a fare and proceeds to converse with them on various current events. Dave demands that the fare pay in cash and not with the Visa credit card (often with the line "You pay cash, no Visa. You pay Visa I kill you.") He also pronounces the I in Visa with a hard I (v-eye-za) and not a soft I (v-ee-za) as is usually the case. The cabbie also often takes the passenger somewhere other than requested and then demands an outrageous price. For a famous celebrity's death, Dave says "It's very sad about Mister Rogers. He imitates Rogers saying, "Not a beautiful day in the neighbourhood." Although he has a thick Ukrainian accent, he claims to be originally from Regina (The "flat part"). Although he usually speaks the most, when the client leaves he claims that "(he) thought that (the client) would never shut up."
- "English as a Second Language News", hosted by Heikki Flergenpootz (Abbott, in a horned helmet) and Svetlana (Goy, in a fruit hat). The sketch is a typical newsroom sketch, often peppered with mistakes that typical ESL learners make. In later years, they typically said "Goodbye" at the beginning of the sketch and "Hello" at the end. Each sketch also included a third "guest commentator" portrayed by Ferguson, some of which would later get their own sketches.
- "Get Stuffed", in which Jock McBile (Morgan), a Scottish-Canadian left-handed bagpipe repair man, put his spin on current events.
- "I Love that Word Refoooorm", in which Preston Manning (Ferguson, although Manning himself has appeared in the sketch playing Ferguson's role), promotes his party, with comical results. Manning was frequently accompanied by various guests (most often Morgan as Deborah Grey, deputy leader of the party, although Grey herself has been a guest) who criticize Manning on his speech. Manning ended the sketch with the phrase "I love that word reform", with "reform" being drawn out for comedic effect.
- "Knob of the Week", a sketch in the style of the Chicken Cannon "honouring" various acts of stupidity by various groups. It was introduced partially to replace the Chicken Cannon, which was specially reserved for the Year of the Farce show and possibly the season opener (both of which were one-hour shows compared to the regular 30-minute shows).
- "Man's World" with Buck McSweeney (Ferguson). Typically, Ferguson is joined by a special guest star (most often an athlete) playing as themselves. Buck proceeds to do a typical sports interview while letting his obsession with synchronized swimming be known.
- "Member for Kicking Horse Pass", in which the fictional Member of Parliament (Dave Broadfoot), reprising his original radio role, performs a solo comedy sketch (as a representative of the "New Apathetic Party".)
- "News From Away" with Jimmy and Seamus O'Toole (Abbott and Ferguson). Another newsroom sketch where Abbott and Ferguson play newscasters from Newfoundland. There are a number of sketches-within-a-sketch interspersed throughout, common ones being:
  - "52 Weeks in 52 Seconds", in which Jimmy and Seamus rapid fire various one-liners based on events that occurred in the past year. It is typically a part of every Year of the Farce show.
  - "Point-Counterpoint", in which Jimmy and Seamus try to debate an issue from different points of view. However, one starts the argument and the other agrees on the spot.
  - "Seamus' Commentary", where Seamus makes a one-line commentary about one particular issue. In one sketch, he delivered his commentary in the style of a Rick Mercer streeter from This Hour Has 22 Minutes, and Mercer himself showed up mid-sketch to correct Seamus' delivery style.
  - During the show's live 300th episode, Alan Park played the role of Seamus, because the last sketch had Don Ferguson doing his Rex Murphy impersonation, accompanied by Mary Walsh who did her famous character, Marg: Princess Warrior.
- "Not the Official Story", where a newspaper editor (Alan Park) comments on current events.
- "Off the Record", a sketch that itself parodies TSN's Off The Record sports talk show, with Ferguson playing the role of host Michael Landsberg.
- "Sermon from the Mount", where a prophet (Morgan) proceeds to recall current events in the style of a sermon or lines from the Bible.
- "Speedvision News", a newsroom sketch (purportedly on the Speedvision television channel) where two anchors (Abbott and Ferguson) speak quickly while recalling current events. Similar sketches also lampoon Rogers Sportsnet's and The Score's news programmes (Sportsnetnews and Score Tonight), where Holmes and Ferguson play the roles of the anchors (Holmes plays either Jody Vance or Martine Gaillard, while it is unclear which sportscaster Ferguson is playing).
- "Liberal and PC" a spoof of the "Get a Mac" ad, Park plays a Liberal (parody of the Mac) and Lauzon plays a "PC" (Progressive Conservative) and follows the outline of the Mac ad.
- "Billy Two Willies", played by Abbott, a representative of First Nations, asserting their right to sell tax-free cigarettes and run casinos.

=== Individual sketches ===
Some of Air Farce's famous individual sketches include:

==== Politically correct version of "O Canada" ====
In response to criticisms from different groups about O Canada's lyrics, Air Farce had guest star Seán Cullen sing an edited, politically correct version of the anthem. The skit was performed on October 5, 2001.

The following is the lyrics of the edited "O Canada".

O Canada, our living quarters and aboriginals persons, including Inuit, Métis, and First Nations land
True patriot love, implying affection, but not in a sexual way, in all thy gender non-specific spouse offspring's suggestion
With glowing hearts, we get horny, the true North strong and free
From far and weight-challenged, O Canada, we stand or sit on guard for thee
Non-denominational, gender-unspecified supreme being keep our land, glorious and free
O Canada, we stand ready to sit down and discuss our differences in a civilized manner for thee
O Canada, we stand ready to sit down and discuss our differences in a civilized manner for thee

== Guests ==
Air Farce has its share of guests, including those who portray themselves. The show generally features Canadian guest stars, or people whose careers are primarily Canadian, such as athletes Doug Flutie and Carlos Delgado.

- Jann Arden – Arden was a guest who largely disliked her appearance on Air Farce. She was repeatedly interrupted when she was about to sing by Colonel Stacy, in the midst of preparing to fire the "Chicken Cannon". Although she got to fire the cannon, her experience on Air Farce, as she described it, was not a pleasant one.
- Margaret Atwood – Atwood appeared at the final episode (New Year's Eve 2008) at the beginning of the show.
- Mike Bullard – appeared on an episode of Gilbert Smythe Bite-Me.
- Brent Butt
- Jeffrey Buttle – Figure skater, after he won the world championship in March 2008.
- Jean Charest appeared during the 1998 Year of the Farce in the sketch, 'Ottawa Confidencial.' According to the PI character played by Morgan, Charest had all the characteristics to become Prime Minister of Canada except that he was not born by a virgin.
- Don Cherry – Appeared for a video message to the show's live 300th episode.
- Jean Chrétien – Chrétien had one appearance on Air Farce, in which he claimed that Abbot's impersonation sounded more like Preston Manning.
- Joe Clark – Pays a visit to Jean Chrétien (Abbott) to offer some advice, former Prime Minister to current Prime Minister; the gag is that everything Joe says has a word that rhymes with "right", since he is a Conservative while Chrétien is a Liberal.
- Sheila Copps – During a New Year's Eve Special, the at-the-time Deputy Prime Minister interrupted the parody sketch "RoboCopps."
- David Cronenberg – Appeared during an episode of Gilbert Smythe-Bite Me.
- John Crosbie
- Seán Cullen – Cullen has appeared several times on the show, initially as the leader of Corky and the Juice Pigs for a musical number comparing the 1993 Federal election to Gilligan's Island; he also appeared as "Quint" in a spoof of the movie Jaws.
- Stockwell Day
- Gill Deacon – Both she and George Stroumboulopoulos beat up Craig Lauzon.
- Fred Ewanuick – In character as Hank Yarbo From Corner Gas, appeared on the live 300th episode.
- Joe Flaherty – From SCTV, made an appearance in 2002.
- Megan Follows – Best known for her role as Anne Shirley in Anne of Green Gables; introduced Air Farce Live on December 7, 2007, and played the role of Sue Johanson in The Canadian View skit.
- Red Green – Steve Smith appeared as Red Green doing a Handyman's Corner segment where he showed how to make an angel to top off a Christmas tree.
- Deborah Grey – Grey appeared in one sketch on Air Farce, in which she was a guest on Ferguson's "I Love That Word Refooooorm" sketch. In the final moments of the sketch, she, along with Ferguson (as Preston Manning), sang Auld Lang Syne, forgetting most of the lyrics partway through.
- Paul Gross – the star of Due South reprises his role in a "lost episode" in which he falls for Rita MacNeil (Goy).
- Sitara Hewitt – From Little Mosque on the Prairie and You Bet Your Ass, appeared on the live 300th episode.
- Mel Hurtig – First political guest on the TV show; as leader of the newly formed and almost unheard of National Party of Canada, he appeared in a game show where the contestants couldn't identify the man, even after he tells them who he is.
- Sue Johanson – The host of Sunday Night Sex Show appeared during a New Year's Eve special. Luba Goy, who was parodying Johanson, got up to retrieve a book. Johanson herself returned, book in hand, exclaiming "Found it."
- Flora MacDonald
- Ron MacLean – the host of Hockey Night in Canada has appeared on Air Farce in several sketches, most notably one in which he portrays himself alongside Goy (as the Queen who is impersonating Don Cherry). He was also involved in a sketch where an airline passenger Onex CEO Gerry Schwartz is mistaken for him. Later in the sketch, Schwartz and MacLean (both guest stars portraying themselves), switch seats, and the passenger mistakes MacLean for Schwartz. Another memorable sketch had MacLean impersonate Cherry while Ferguson played the role of MacLean. MacLean also appeared for a video message to the show's live 300th episode. He also appeared in the final program of the series to fire the Chicken Cannon.
- Shaun Majumder – Made an appearance in 2002, before his newscasting role on This Hour Has 22 Minutes.
- John Manley – Manley appeared in a "Man's World" sketch (a rarity since he is a politician and not an athlete) shortly after his remarks on how Canada should abandon the monarchy. Most memorable in this sketch was Buck McSweeney's reaction to Manley's indifference towards synchronized swimming: "... and you call yourself Manley!"
- Preston Manning – largely considered to be the first guest star on Air Farce, Manning has appeared in many sketches, including a Blair Witch Project parody. In some appearances, he also pronounced "Reform" in the same manner as Ferguson, who normally portrayed him in sketches.
- Peter Mansbridge – Mansbridge has appeared on several Air Farce sketches, most notably a Man to Mansbridge sketch in which he is interviewed by Abbot (also as Mansbridge). In another memorable show, there was a running gag was where Mansbridge, in his role as anchor for The National, finds himself appointed as the head of CBC while announcing a new series of appointments by the prime minister. Mansbridge also appeared for a video message to the show's live 300th episode.
- Paul Martin – Appeared on a spoof of Venture when he was Minister of Finance, and threatened to audit the host, Robert Scully (Ferguson) when he tries to hand deliver his tax return to save on postage.
- Sheila McCarthy – From Little Mosque on the Prairie, appeared on the live 300th episode.
- Patrick McKenna – McKenna has appeared in various Air Farce sketches, most notably one in which he appears as Marty Stephens, his character from Traders, but with the voice and mannerisms of his The Red Green Show character, Harold Green.
- Rick Mercer – Mercer appeared on Air Farce in a sketch where Ferguson, as Seamus O'Toole, parodied his trademark "Screener" sketch from This Hour Has 22 Minutes. Mercer would first confront O'Toole, then later show him how it's done.
- Colin Mochrie – Mochrie has appeared in various Air Farce sketches, most notably as an associate to Colonel Stacy on the "Chicken Cannon".
- Ben Mulroney
- Rex Murphy – Rex Murphy guest starred as himself, interviewing Samuel De Champlain.
- Anne Murray – Murray appeared in one sketch titled Murray and the Queen, where the two shared their surprisingly similar New Year's resolutions.
- Russell Peters – Appeared in an episode in 2005 and the 2015 New Year's Eve special as Dr. Malcolm Sidwell.
- Bob Rae
- Lloyd Robertson – Robertson, who had once stated that it was an honor to appear on Air Farce to parody himself, appeared in several Air Farce sketches, most notably in one where he, as the CTV news anchor, asks a correspondent, "Do you think I'm as handsome as Peter Mansbridge? What about Peter Kent? He's very good looking."
- Carlo Rota – From Little Mosque on the Prairie, appeared on the live 300th episode.
- Sonja Smits – From the TV series Traders, made two appearances in 2001.
- Evan Solomon – Beat up Craig Lauzon.
- Elvis Stojko
- Trish Stratus – Stratus appeared in one Air Farce show, although she was a part of several sketches, most notably one where she portrayed a stripper in a sketch lampooning the Judy Sgro "strippergate" scandal. (This can also be a spoof of Trish herself, since she has refused several offers to appear in Playboy)
- George Stroumboulopoulos – He and fellow CBC personality Gill Deacon beat up Craig Lauzon over Lauzon's impersonations of Stroumboulopoulos.
- The Canadian Tire Couple (Ted Simonett and Gloria Slade) – They appeared in a sketch made to look like one of their regular ads, where they promoted the "Baby Power Washer".
- Pamela Wallin – Wallin has made several appearances on Air Farce, including one in which Goy portrays herself as the Canadian host of Who Wants to Be a Millionaire? while Wallin, as Catherine Zeta-Jones, appears as a celebrity contestant.
- Mary Walsh – Creator of This Hour Has 22 Minutes, appeared on the live 300th episode.
- Brian Williams – then-CBC Sports anchor who has made several appearances on Air Farce, most memorably in which he portrays himself locked in his studio at the conclusion of the 2000 Olympic Games.
- David Suzuki – Suzuki's appearance on Air Farce is memorable, as he appeared nude in the sketch (although the nudity was covered by a briefcase and later a desk), a parody of an ad campaign Suzuki participated in for his show The Nature of Things. In his sketch, he is interviewed, where the interviewer (Goy), aware of his nudity, is taken aback by Suzuki's apparent use of double entendres, and later faints when Suzuki asks her if she wanted to see his "genetically altered banana". Suzuki, clueless to the ordeal, then produces a slightly larger-than-normal banana.
- Former premier of New Brunswick, Bernard Lord once appeared in an episode taped in Saint John.
