= Vivieno Caldinelli =

Canadian film and television director

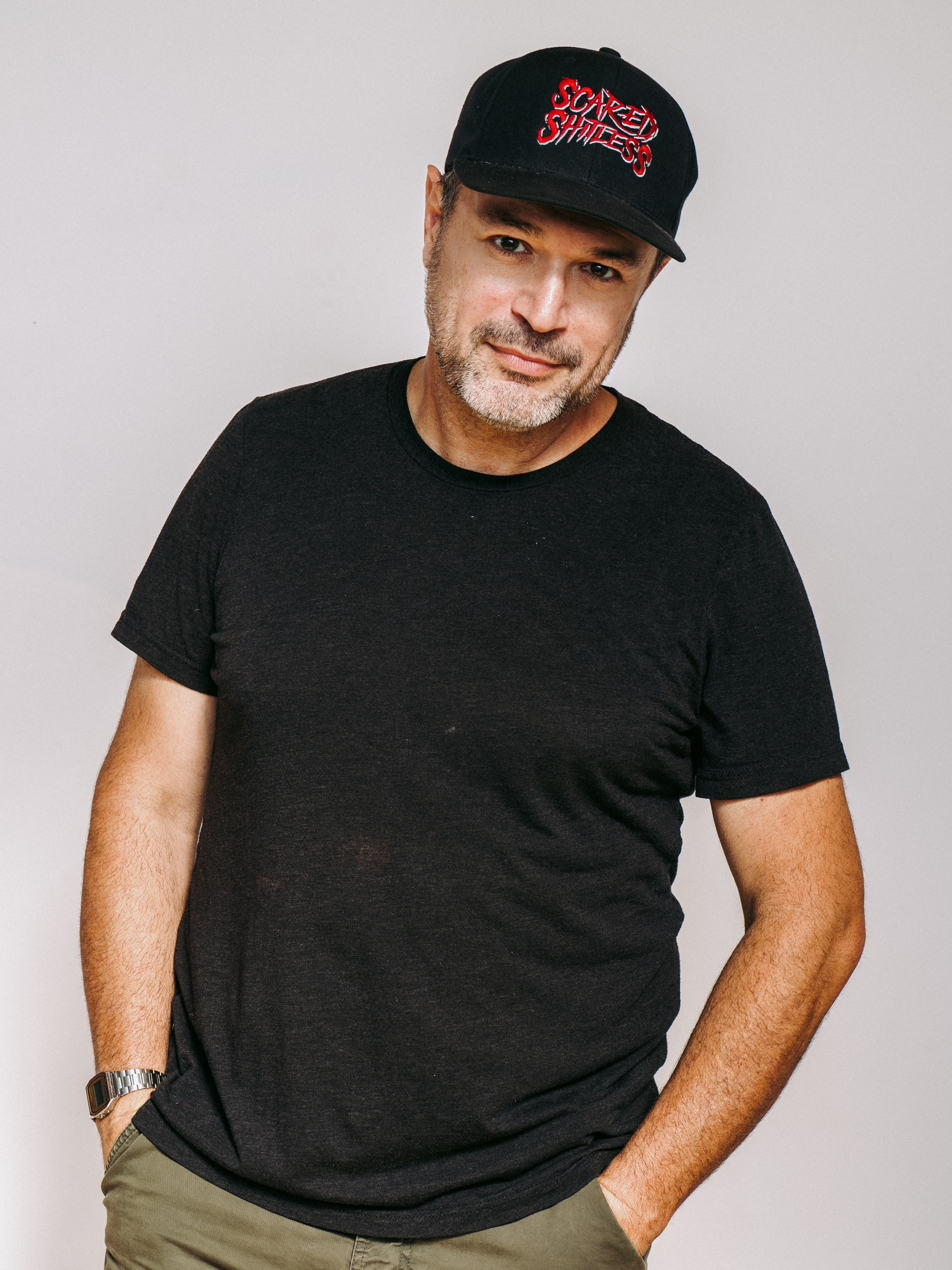
Image of Vivieno Caldinelli

Vivieno Caldinelli is a Canadian film and television director from Hamilton, Ontario. He is most noted for his work as a director of Baroness von Sketch Show, for which he won both the Directors Guild of Canada award for Outstanding Direction in a Comedy Series and the Canadian Screen Award for Best Direction in a Variety or Sketch Comedy Program or Series.

His debut feature film, Seven Stages to Achieve Eternal Bliss, was released in 2018. He followed up in 2024 with Scared Shitless, which was second runner-up for the Audience Award for Best Canadian Feature at the 28th Fantasia International Film Festival.

He was formerly a partner with Mark Montefiore in Polenta Productions. His other television credits have included Picnicface, This Hour Has 22 Minutes, Hotbox, HumanTown and Bruno & Boots.

He was also a performer in Hotbox, a sketch comedy series.

== Awards ==
Award	Year	Category	Work	Result	Ref(s)
Canadian Comedy Awards	2007	Best Direction in a Film	If I See Randy Again, Do You Want Me to Hit Him with the Axe?	Nominated	
Canadian Comedy Awards	2007	Best Writing in a Film	If I See Randy Again, Do You Want Me to Hit Him with the Axe? with Winston Spear	Nominated	
Canadian Comedy Awards	2008	Best Direction in a Television Series	Hotbox: "The Owl and the Man"	Nominated	
Canadian Comedy Awards	2010	Best Direction in a Television Series	Hotbox	Nominated	
Canadian Comedy Awards	2010	Best Writing in a Television Series	Hotbox with Pat Thornton, Tim Polley, Graham Wagner, Katie Crown, Bob Kerr	Nominated	
Canadian Comedy Awards	2010	Best Performance by an Ensemble in a Television Series	Hotbox with Pat Thornton, Sandy Jobin-Bevans, Levi MacDougall, Jeff McEnery, Tal Zimerman	Nominated	
Canadian Comedy Awards	2014	Best Direction in a Television Series	This Hour Has 22 Minutes with Michael Lewis	Nominated	
Canadian Comedy Awards	2015	Best Direction in a Television Series	This Hour Has 22 Minutes with Michael Lewis	Won	
Canadian Comedy Awards	2015	Best Direction in a Web Series	Bill & Sons Towing	Nominated	
Canadian Screen Awards	2017	Best Direction in a Variety or Sketch Comedy Program or Series	This Hour Has 22 Minutes with Michael Lewis	Nominated	
Canadian Screen Awards	2021	Best Direction in a Variety or Sketch Comedy Program or Series	Baroness von Sketch Show with Joyce Wong	Won	
Directors Guild of Canada	2016	Best Short Film	Portal to Hell!!	Won	
Directors Guild of Canada	2021	Outstanding Directorial Achievement, Comedy Series	Baroness von Sketch Show with Joyce Wong	Won	
