= John Morgan (comedian) =

Welsh-born Canadian comedian (1930–2004)

- Born: September 21, 1930; Aberdare, Wales
- Died: November 15, 2004 (aged 74); Toronto, Ontario, Canada

John Morgan (September 21, 1930 – November 15, 2004) was a Welsh-born Canadian comedian.

Born in Aberdare, Wales, Morgan and his comedy partner, Martin Bronstein, co-founded the comedy troupe The Jest Society in Montreal in 1970. The troupe moved to Toronto and evolved into the Royal Canadian Air Farce in 1973 which had a sketch comedy CBC Radio show under that name on which he played numerous characters such as mortician Hector Baggley and socialite Amy De La Pompa. When the troupe moved to CBC Television in 1993, he played additional characters on the Air Farce television show such as perpetually disgusted Scotsman Jock McBile, and monosyllabic Mike from Canmore, as well as satirical portrayals of such prominent individuals as Herb Gray, Deborah Grey, and Boris Yeltsin.

Morgan wrote the pilot for the popular Canadian sitcom King of Kensington. Prior to founding the Jest Society, he and writing partner Bronstein created and starred in the CBC radio series Funny You Should Say That. He also had his own BBC Radio series called It's All in the Mind of John Morgan.

In 2000, he was nominated for a Canadian Comedy Award. Along with the original cast of Air Farce – Roger Abbott, Don Ferguson and Luba Goy – Morgan received the Governor General's Performing Arts Award for Lifetime Artistic Achievement in 1998.

Before launching his comedy career in 1966, Morgan worked as a journalist, editor, teacher, and pub owner.

Morgan retired from Air Farce in 2001. On November 15, 2004, Morgan died at his home in Toronto from a heart attack at the age of 74.

== See also ==
- List of comedians
