= Martin Bronstein =

British-Canadian actor, writer

Martin Bronstein (born 1935) is a British-Canadian actor, writer, columnist, broadcaster and journalist.

== Life and career ==
Bronstein was born in London, England. He moved to Canada in 1959 and worked as a copywriter, journalist and comedy writer. He also worked for the Canadian Broadcasting Corporation interviewing a series of entertainers, including Oscar Peterson, Dave Brubeck, Bob Dylan, Jack Benny, Dudley Moore, Dizzy Gillespie, Sir Malcolm Sargent, Nina Simone, and Duke Ellington. With John Morgan, he wrote a comedy series, Funny You Should Say That, for CBC.

Bronstein was a founding member in 1970 of the Jest Society, which became the Royal Canadian Air Farce in 1973. He left the comedy troupe to return to journalism in 1974 but continued to write for the troupe for the rest of the decade. In 1982, he returned to Britain to become editor of Squash Player International magazine and has written extensively on the sport in the ensuing decades.
