= Roger Abbott =

Canadian comedian (1946–2011)

- Born: July 10, 1946; Birkenhead, Cheshire, England
- Died: March 26, 2011 (aged 64); Toronto, Ontario, Canada
- Occupation: Sketch comedian
- Years active: 1973–2010

Roger Abbott (July 10, 1946 – March 26, 2011) was an English-born Canadian sketch comedian who was a founding member of the long-lived Canadian comedy troupe Royal Canadian Air Farce, and remained one of its stars and writers until his death.

== Early life ==
Abbott was born in Birkenhead, England; at age 7, he and his family moved to Montreal. While attending Loyola High School, he met Don Ferguson, who would become a co-star of Royal Canadian Air Farce. After graduation in 1963, he attended Loyola College (now Concordia University).

== Career ==
Abbott began his career in behind-the-scene jobs in radio. In 1970, comedians John Morgan and Martin Bronstein, who were looking for non-actors who could write and perform their own material, convinced Abbott to join the cast of an improvisational theatre revue called The Jest Society (a pun on then-Prime Minister Pierre Trudeau's famous goal of making Canada a "Just Society"). After a number of personnel changes, the troupe — now consisting of Abbott, Morgan, Bronstein, Don Ferguson, Luba Goy and Dave Broadfoot— became known as the Royal Canadian Air Farce. On December 9, 1973, they began a weekly broadcast on CBC radio in front of a live audience at the CBC's Parliament Street studio in Toronto. Abbott quickly showed his organizational abilities — Don Ferguson called him "the guiding light of Royal Canadian Air Farce" and "a combination of artistic, organizational and business talent". Abbott also became the "warm-up man" for the weekly broadcasts, chatting to the audience before introducing the rest of the cast. Abbott said the greatest influences on his style of comedy were Dave Broadfoot and the British comedy troupe Monty Python. Bronstein left the troupe the following year—the remaining members became the ongoing cast of Royal Canadian Air Farce for many years.

Air Farce branched into television in 1980 with a 10-week series of television shows for CBC, although they continued to produce their weekly radio show. About the same time, the producers of the American sitcom Taxi offered Abbott and Ferguson a chance to be writers on the show, but they turned the offer down.

In 1989, Abbott directed Huge Jumbo Comedy Thing, a show starring a troupe called the Maroons that CHOM-FM described as "Canada's answer to Monty Python".

For many years, Abbott and Don Ferguson co-hosted the annual televised Easter Seals Telethon.

In 1992, Royal Canadian Air Farce returned to television, this time as a weekly series, although the weekly radio series also continued to be produced until 1997. Abbott became well known for many roles on the television show, including parodies of Jean Chrétien, The Queen Mother, Yasser Arafat, Leonard Cohen, George W. Bush, Brian Williams, Peter Mansbridge, Don Newman, Craig Oliver, and "Native Persons Spokesman" Billy Two-Willies.

The title of the television show changed several times, first shortened to Air Farce, then to Air Farce Live, and in its final season (2008–2009), Air Farce Live—The Final Flight. Air Farce continued to produce occasional specials for CBC, and Abbott's last appearance on Air Farce was their New Year's Eve special that aired on December 31, 2010.

== Death ==
Abbott was diagnosed with the progressive disease chronic lymphocytic leukemia in 1997, but only shared this fact with family and close friends. After a 14-year battle, he succumbed to leukemia on March 26, 2011, at Toronto General Hospital at the age of 64.

== Tributes ==
- A video tribute to Abbott from his friends and colleagues at Royal Canadian Air Farce was posted on YouTube on March 27, 2011.
- An hour-long tribute to Abbott, featuring many of his memorable sketches, aired on CBC Television on March 29, 2011.

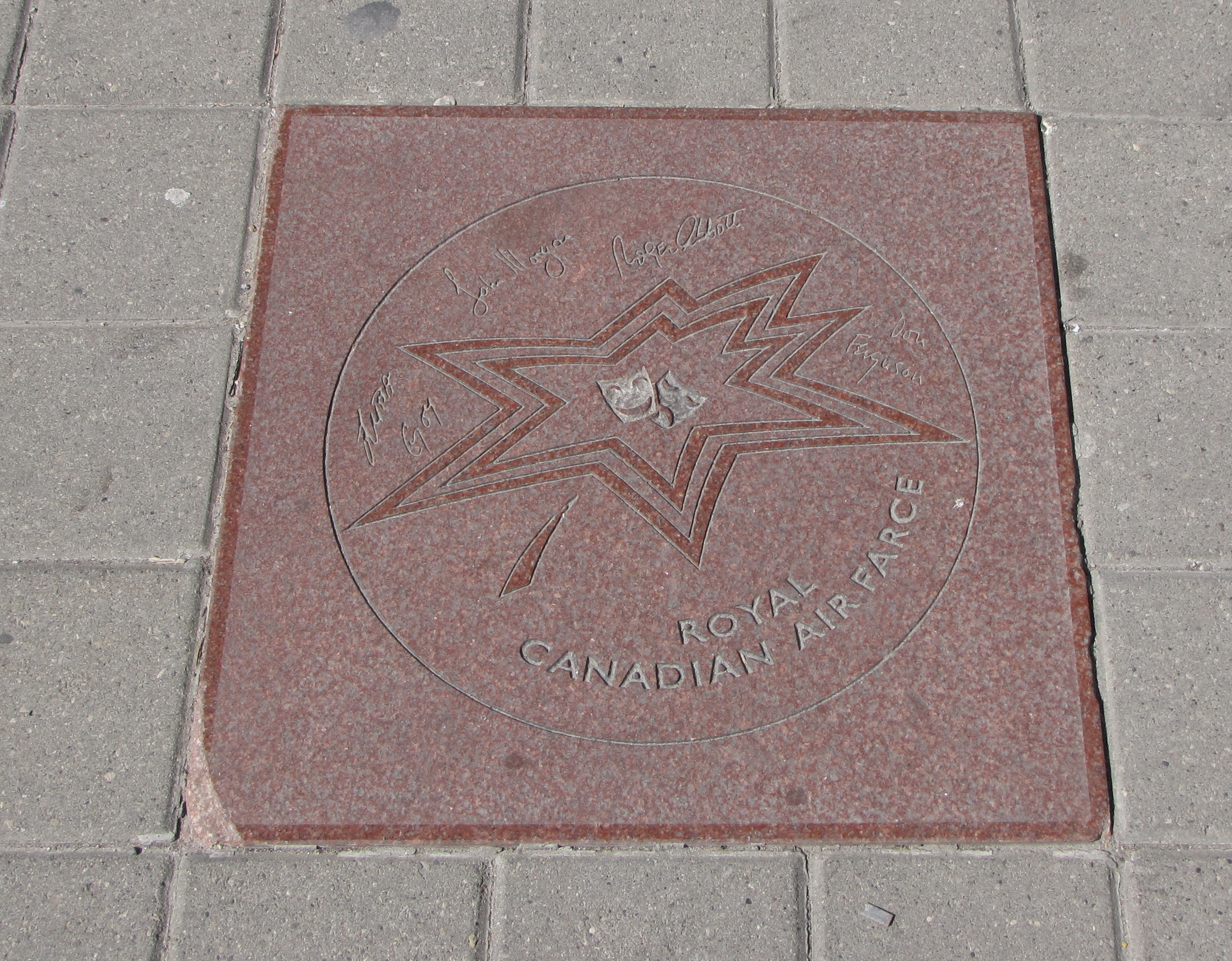
Royal Canadian Air Farce's star on Walk of Fame in Toronto, signed by Roger Abbott and other cast members

- A memorial service entitled "Roger's Wrap Party" was held in Toronto on April 11, 2011. Speakers included Jessica Holmes, Dave Broadfoot, Vicki Gabereau, Luba Goy, and Don Ferguson.
- The Air Farce New Years Day special was dedicated to the memory of Roger Abbott. A small segment was shown with the donut foursome sitting at the table with the also late John Morgan. At the end of the special, the message "Dedicated to the Memory of Roger Abbott" appeared on screen.

== Awards ==
- Gemini Humanitarian Award
- Governor General's Performing Arts Award for Lifetime Artistic Achievement
- 15 ACTRA Awards
- a Juno Award
- a star on the Canada's Walk of Fame
- Honorary doctor of laws, Brock University, 1993
