= Royal Canadian Air Farce =

Defunct Canadian comedy performance group

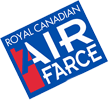
- Notable work: Royal Canadian Air Farce radio (1973–1997); TV (1980–1984, 1993–2007); Air Farce Live TV (2007–2008); Air Farce New Year's Specials TV (1992–2019)

Comedy career
- Years active: 1973-2019
- Medium: Television, radio, theatre, albums, home video
- Genres: Sketch comedy, Political satire
- Members: Don Ferguson; Luba Goy; Craig Lauzon; Darryl Hinds; Jessica Holmes; Isabel Kanaan; Chris Wilson See also: Cast history
- Former members: Roger Abbott; Dave Broadfoot; Martin Bronstein; Lisa Gilroy; John Morgan; Arnold Pinnock; Penelope Corrin; Aisha Alfa; Emma Hunter; Alan Park
- Website: www.airfarce.com

The Royal Canadian Air Farce was a comedy troupe that was active from 1973 to 2019. It is best known for their various Canadian Broadcasting Corporation series, first on CBC Radio and later on CBC Television. Although their weekly radio series ended in 1997 and their television series ended in 2008, the troupe produced annual New Year's Eve specials on CBC Television until 2019. CBC announced that, due to budgetary constraints, the special scheduled to air on December 30, 2019, would be the final in the series.

== History ==
=== Theatre revue and radio years ===
The group started in Montreal, Quebec, in 1970 as an improvisational theatre revue called The Jest Society, a pun on then-Prime Minister Pierre Trudeau's famous goal of making Canada a "just society". The original cast was John Morgan, Martin Bronstein, Patrick Conlon, Gay Claitman, and Roger Abbott.

The troupe moved to Toronto, where it had a long-term residency at the Poor Alex Theatre. Steve Whistance-Smith was briefly a member, replacing Patrick Conlon, who declined to continue commuting to Toronto from Montreal. Don Ferguson joined after Whistance-Smith left. The show was favourably reviewed by local theatre critics, attracting the attention of CBC Radio. It commissioned the troupe to perform sketches on its weekly variety show, The Entertainers; the sketches were taped at a CBC studio without a live audience.

After a number of personnel changes, the group became known as the "Royal Canadian Air Farce" in 1973; they were given their own show, taped in front of a live audience at the Curtain Club in Richmond Hill, Ontario. The CBC gives the date of the first broadcast as December 9, 1973. By this time, the lineup consisted of Roger Abbott, Luba Goy, John Morgan, Dave Broadfoot, and Martin Bronstein. At this point Don Ferguson was a writer on the show. They quickly became one of the network's most popular programs.

Most of their later shows were based in Toronto and recorded in CBC's Cabbagetown Studios. As the troupe became more popular, they frequently travelled throughout the country to record their weekly radio broadcasts, which featured a mixture of political and cultural satire strongly influenced by the style of Wayne and Shuster. The touring show also often included one or more sketches satirizing local culture or politics, which were not aired on the national radio broadcast.

Bronstein ceased performing with the troupe in 1974 to pursue a full-time journalism career; he continued to write for the Air Farce until the late 1970s. Ferguson, who had been a writer on the show's first season, swapped places with Bronstein, becoming a writer-performer. In 1977, non-performing writers Gord Holtam and Rick Olsen joined the crew. In the late 1970s during a trip to Los Angeles, Abbott and Ferguson were offered jobs writing for the new television sitcom Taxi, but opted to remain with Air Farce instead.

Recurring characters included addle-brained hockey player Big Bobby Clobber (Broadfoot), Sgt. Renfrew of the Royal Canadian Mounted Police (Broadfoot), and socialite Amy De La Pompa (Morgan), along with political figures such as Brian Mulroney, Joe Clark, and Pierre Trudeau. Additional characters included Prof. Hieronymus Wombat of the National Research Council and funeral director Hector Baggley.

Another recurring character, making vacant-minded political comments, was the Honourable David J. Broadfoot, Member of Parliament for Kicking Horse Pass and leader of the New Apathetic Party. Broadfoot had been performing as this character for years, and had appeared on Canadian and American television as "The Honourable Member" as early as the 1950s, long before his tenure with Air Farce.

Air Farce Productions Inc., which was incorporated in 1978, is the legal owner of the Royal Canadian Air Farce and owns the troupe's works. John Morgan, Roger Abbott, and Don Ferguson were the long-time business partners. Morgan sold his share of the company to Abbot and Ferguson when he retired in 2001. Since the death of Abbot in 2011, Don Ferguson has been the company's sole owner. Ferguson was the producer of the Air Farce television series since 2004; he was the executive producer of the annual Air Farce New Year's Eve specials from 2010 to 2019.

=== Trying out TV ===
In 1977, Air Farce writers Abbott, Broadfoot, Ferguson, and Morgan adapted several of their radio sketches for television, in addition to writing new material. The sketches were aired as the first two episodes of the six-part CBC series Krazy House, a compendium of sketch comedy pieces from various Canadian writers and performers that aired in January and February 1977. Broadfoot was the only Air Farce cast member to appear on-camera in these two episodes, which also starred Billy Van, amongst others. The fifth episode of Krazy House was written entirely by Morgan, and featured Air Farce cast member Luba Goy along with Billy Van, Harvey Atkin, and others.

The Farce troupe recorded a one-hour television special in 1980. It was developed as a ten-week series and two sequel specials, in addition to their regular radio series. The shows were performed in front of a live studio audience, mixing fully produced sketches with some sketches that were essentially staged versions of the radio show, featuring the cast members standing around a microphone reading from scripts rather than acting out the roles. Despite the decent ratings for the initial special, staging the radio sketches in such a way did not translate well on television, and the Air Farce faded from CBC TV by 1983. In 1984, the troupe's live Toronto stage show was videotaped as a pay-TV special, and subsequently broadcast on Ontario's Global Television Network.

The troupe continued on radio, though, where they flourished for the next decade. While the first decade of the show was largely recorded before a live audience at CBC Radio's Cabbagetown studio in Toronto, from 1984 to 1992 the show was recorded for broadcast on the road in communities across Canada. In this period, troupe also performed in non-broadcast concert and theatrical performances across North America. Some popular sketches in the late 1980s and early 1990s included "joint broadcasts" by CTV and CBC, overlaying opening theme music. When The Journal debuted on CBC in 1982, Air Farce spoofed the program's repeated use of the "sounder", and the use of satellite to connect people to talk to one another (including husband in living room to wife in the kitchen), as well as the seeming similarity between original hosts Barbara Frum and Mary Lou Finlay.

In the early 1980s, Air Farce's summer radio hiatus periods were filled by another comedy troupe, the Frantics, who later moved on to their own TV series, Four on the Floor. Later summer hiatus periods, however, were filled by Ferguson and Abbott playing classic comedy recordings, or by newer comedy troupes such as Radio Free Vestibule. In the late 1980s, CBC Radio launched another 30-minutes weekly political satire, Double Exposure.

Broadfoot retired from the troupe in 1989, although he continued to make guest appearances with Air Farce for many years afterward, on both radio and TV. Barbara Budd was also a frequent guest of the troupe, appearing in many radio episodes of the 1980s and early 1990s, although she was never an official cast member.

=== Success with TV ===
In 1992, Air Farce took a second plunge into television with 1992: Year of the Farce, a satirical New Year's Eve special. This time, the troupe elected to perform all their sketches in a more traditional (if low-budget) TV style, rather than performing some of them in front of a radio microphone. A ratings smash, the special led the troupe to produce another weekly television series, which debuted in 1993. However, this time the move to television was permanent. The radio series continued alongside the TV show for four seasons until May 1997, when it was discontinued.

The practice of having a show on New Year's Eve continued to the end of the program, and such episodes were typically titled "Year of the Farce". In recent years, Air Farce also had the honour of counting down the seconds before the New Year on CBC.

Recurring characters on the TV series included the slow Albertan Mike, from Canmore (Morgan) and angry Scot Jock McBile (Morgan), self-righteous movie critic Gilbert Smythe Bite-Me (Abbott), and chain-smoking bingo player Brenda (Goy). Though these characters would occasionally feature in sketches of their own, usually they were used at the beginning of the show to deliver a stream of one-line jokes commenting on the news of that week.

The show also featured frequent sketches with politicians, who were portrayed as various extreme caricatures of their most infamous personality quirks. Notable re-occurring figures included Prime Minister Jean Chrétien (Abbott), who could barely speak a single sentence of English without committing at least a dozen outlandish pronunciation and grammatical errors; the nasally voiced Preston Manning (Ferguson) who loved to shout "REFOOOOOOORM!"; a screaming Sheila Copps (Goy); the tyrannical Lucien Bouchard; the dopey and overly image conscious Stockwell Day; the strutting, clucking, pompous Joe Clark; and the power-hungry Paul Martin (all Ferguson). Many of the real politicians also made guest appearances on the show, often interacting directly with their parodic counterparts: for example, in one sketch late in the show's run, Ferguson played Jack Layton answering questions at a press conference; midway through the sketch he requested a moment to consult with his "top advisor", and out came the real Jack Layton.

However, Colonel "Teresa" Stacy (Ferguson) quickly emerged as the show's most popular character—each time he appeared, Stacy would load up the Chicken Cannon and fire rubber chickens and other assorted projectiles at whomever he deemed the most annoying public figure of the week (or year).

Morgan retired from Air Farce in 2001, and the remaining three members carried on with a rotating stable of guest stars until Jessica Holmes joined the show in 2003. Holmes added celebrity figures such as Paris Hilton and Liza Minnelli, and Canadian politicians such as Belinda Stronach, to the troupe's roster of characters.

Later, in 2005, after a lockout at CBC, Air Farce gained two new cast members, who had previously appeared on the show as recurring guest stars: Alan Park and Craig Lauzon. The addition of these two newcomers brought the total number of performers in the troupe to six. Park initially only signed on to do rant-like segments, saying in interviews that he'd never play a character, but ended up taking on roles including Barack Obama. Lauzon regularly portrayed Canadian Prime Minister Stephen Harper, taking his stiff public persona and creating a generally robotic character.

While the show was held up as de facto Canadian tradition, some critics felt that the television show's quality had diminished over the past few seasons, especially since the breakdown of the original four-actor quartet. However, it still continued to draw solid ratings each week.

On March 30, 2007, Air Farce celebrated its 300th episode by doing the show on live television (except in Western Canada) for one hour. Roger Abbott and Luba Goy began the show with a brief history of the show, closing with "the scariest three words on television: AIR FARCE LIVE!".

After this experimental episode, CBC announced that the 15th season of the series would be aired live for the entire season, with a name change to Air Farce Live. With the new live format, Penelope Corrin, who filled in for Holmes during her pregnancy in early 2007, officially joined the troupe, increasing its number to seven.

Abbott, Morgan, Goy, Ferguson, and Broadfoot had cameo appearances in The Red Green Show's movie spinoff Duct Tape Forever.

On April 1, 2008, the CBC and Air Farce jointly announced that the Royal Canadian Air Farce would wrap up its weekly television show in the 2008/2009 season. The plan as announced was for nine new Air Farce shows to be produced for the fall of 2008, and then the series would end with a New Year's Eve special at the end of 2008.

=== New Year's Eve reunion specials ===
Air Farce returned on December 31, 2009, for a New Year's special, featuring the return of most of the original cast (excluding Jessica Holmes, who had a theatrical commitment). As well, long-time writers, Holtham and Olson retired, and did not write for this or any subsequent reunion show.

The first reunion special featured guest appearances by Peter Mansbridge, Battle of the Blades winners Jamie Salé and Craig Simpson, and the Dragons of Dragons' Den. The special also featured the successor to the Chicken Cannon, the "F-Bombs," which were dropped onto photographs from the top of the atrium of the Canadian Broadcasting Centre. A further special aired on December 31, 2010, with Jessica Holmes reuniting with the rest of the cast. She would leave again, and not return to Air Farce until 2016.

Roger Abbott died of leukemia on March 26, 2011. While the troupe had originally not planned to do a special that year due to his death, they were coaxed by producers and the CBC to continue. The 2011 special—the Air Farce Not The New Year's Eve Special—aired on January 1, 2012 (moving to New Year's Day due to Hockey Night in Canada) and featured a new cast member, Arnold Pinnock, who became a regular member of the troupe, and returned during the subsequent 2012–13 edition.

Pinnock elected not to return for the 2014 special. After a talent search, stand-up comic Aisha Alfa and Second City alumnus Darryl Hinds were added. The following year (2015), Park and Corrin left, and Emma Hunter was added to the cast. The year after that Holmes returned, bringing the cast back up to seven.

In 2017 the Air Farce taped two specials; one for Canada Day in celebration of the 150th anniversary of Canada, the other was the troupe's traditional New Year's Eve show.

While ratings for the specials remained strong, drawing over a million viewers in 2017 and 2018, the CBC informed the troupe in May 2019 that due to budgetary constraints, the 2019 year-end special would be the final edition in the series. Broadcast on December 30, 2019, the special included new topical material as well as highlights of the troupe's history, including tributes to deceased members John Morgan, Roger Abbott, and Dave Broadfoot.

== Cast history ==
=== Original members ===
- Roger Abbott (1973–2011) Remained with the Air Farce until his death, at the age of 64, on March 26, 2011.
- Dave Broadfoot (1973–1988) Broadfoot retired in 1988, but was thereafter an occasional "special guest" on both the radio and TV series, his appearances becoming less frequent over time. However, he continued as an occasional special guest right through to the troupe's final regular TV broadcast on December 31, 2008. He died at the age of 90 on November 1, 2016.
- Luba Goy (1973–2019)
- John Morgan (1973–2001) Retired in 2001, died at the age of 74 on November 15, 2004.
- Martin Bronstein (1973–1974), stopped performing with the troupe to focus on journalism and other broadcasting interests such as conducting interviews on The Entertainers, but continued with the troupe as a writer until the late 1970s. Returned to the UK permanently in 1982.
- Don Ferguson (1974–2019) Initially a writer 1973-74, became a writer/performer after Bronstein stopped performing.

=== Later additions ===
- Jessica Holmes (2003–2008, 2010, 2016–2019), did not appear in 2009. Returned in 2016 after a six year hiatus.
- Craig Lauzon (2004–2019), supporting member during 2003, became full member in 2004.
- Alan Park (2004–2014), supporting member during 2003, became full member in 2004. He died on November 10, 2022 at age 60.
- Penelope Corrin (2007–2014), filled in during Holmes' maternity leave during the first two months of 2007, returned for the live season finale, joined cast for 2007/2008 season.
- Arnold Pinnock (2012–2013), addition after the death of Roger Abbott, debuted on 2012 New Year's Day Special.
- Darryl Hinds (2014–2019)
- Aisha Alfa (2014–2016)
- Emma Hunter (2015–2016)
- Isabel Kanaan (2017–2019)
- Chris Wilson (2017–2019)
- Lisa Gilroy (2017)

=== Frequent guest ===
- Barbara Budd (1984–1991), frequent appearances as a "special guest" on the radio show

=== Announcer ===
- Allan McFee was the show's announcer on radio and would occasionally participate in sketches when the programme was taped in Toronto in its first decade. Died on December 12, 2000, at age 87.

=== Members of the Jest Society ===
- John Morgan (1970–1973) co-founder
- Martin Bronstein (1970–1973) co-founder
- Roger Abbott (1970–1973)
- Patrick Conlon (1970–1971), later a journalist, author and broadcaster, died in 2019
- Gay Claitman (1970–1971), later a comedy writer, comedienne, and actress
- Steve Whistance-Smith (1971), later a film and television actor
- Don Ferguson (1971–1973)
- Luba Goy (1971–1973)

== Discography ==
The Air Farce released eight comedy albums during its radio days, all of which are available on the Air Farce website.

- The Air Farce Comedy Album (1978)
- Air Farce Live (1983)
- The Air Farce Green Album (1990)
- To Air Is Human, To Farce Divine (1990)
- Farce On A Stick (1991)
- Year of the Farce (1991)
- Twenty Twenty (1993)
- Unplugged and Uncorked (1994)

== Awards ==
Royal Canadian Air Farce has received the following awards and nominations:

- the Governor General's Performing Arts Award (1998)
- a star on Canada's Walk of Fame (2000)
- a Juno Award for Comedy Album of the Year
- Don Ferguson and Roger Abbott were given a special Gemini Award for "Humanitarians of the Year"
- Maclean's Honour Roll of "Canadians Who Make a Difference"
- the Earle Grey Award for lifetime achievement in Canadian television
- nominated for thirteen Canadian Comedy Awards from 2000 to 2005, but have not won

== See also ==
- Air Farce Live
