= Geri Hall =

Canadian actress (born 1972)

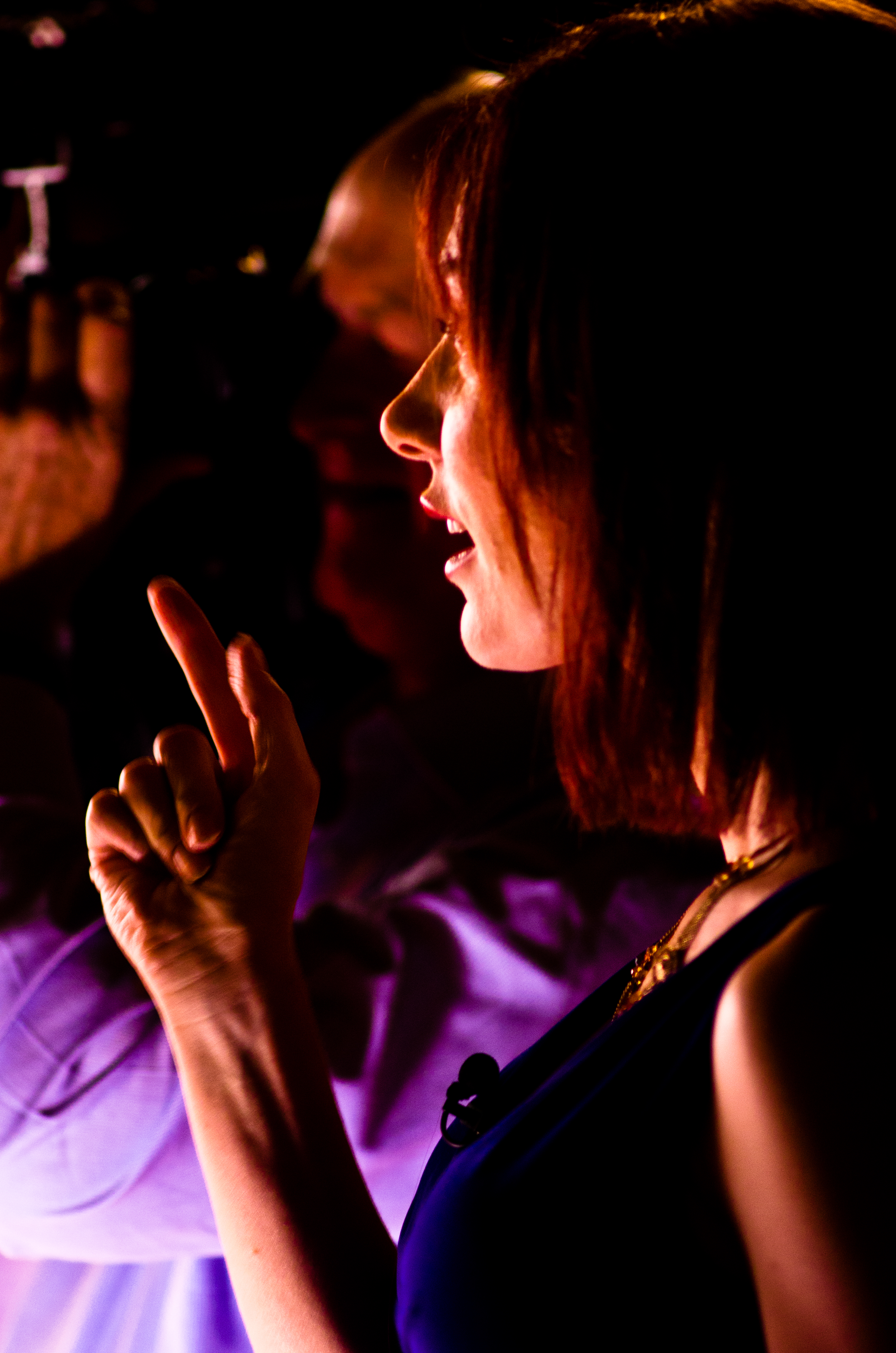
- Geri Hall at TIFF party
- Born: May 1, 1972 (age 54); Oakville, Ontario, Canada
- Occupation: Comedian
- Years active: 2001–present

Geri Hall (born May 1, 1972, in Oakville, Ontario) is a Canadian actress and comedian.

She has appeared on the CBC's This Hour has 22 Minutes in October and November 2004, March 2007 and became a permanent cast anchor in October 2007. Other appearances include the Rick Mercer Report and numerous television commercials. She wrote the Gemini Award-nominated To Die 4. She is known for her distinctive voice. She has appeared in The Blobheads on CBC.

Geri Hall is also known for her attempt to interview Prime Minister Stephen Harper for the CBC comedy series 22 Minutes during the 2008 federal election campaign in Halifax, Nova Scotia on September 12, 2008. Hall, who was in character as "Single Female Voter", was restrained by security and later taken away in handcuffs. She was not arrested and instead got an exclusive interview with Harper, who said he had never watched 22 Minutes, and asked Hall: "Do you like handcuffs?"

They were really going to take me to the station, because they maybe didn't know who I was or maybe did know who I was, depends on how you want to believe it.

— Geri Hall describing her encounter with the RCMP

Hall did a similar stunt on March 4, 2009, when she attempted to poke fun at Ontario Premier Dalton McGuinty's new rule requiring reporters to stand five feet back. It was poorly received due to Hall attempting it in the middle of questions on U.S. Steel's decision to shut down several mills. New Democrat MPP Peter Kormos was visibly angry and yelled at Hall to "Get the hell out of here". Kormos later said "The timing of it was totally inappropriate, you've got a press gallery trying to hold the premier accountable when a few thousand workers just lost their jobs." McGuinty's office said Hall's timing showed a "lack of judgment". 22 Minutes executive producer Mark Farrell defended Hall and claims Hall wouldn't have known what McGuinty was speaking about beforehand. Farrell says she was doing what she always does (and what former 22 Minutes co-host Mary Walsh did before her)—waiting for a signal from organizers that the session was about to wrap up. "We always try to get in at the last question."

Hall played the role of Cynthia in the CBC sitcom One More Time. The show ran for one season in 2024.

In addition to her TV work, Hall is a co-writer and actor in the live sketch show Middle Raged with fellow comedian and long-time friend Gary Pearson. The duo has toured their show in several Canadian provinces.

== Recognition ==
- 2004 Canadian Comedy Award – Television – Pretty Funny Writing – Special or Episode – To Die 4 – Nominated
- 2007 Gemini Award for Best Performance by an Actress in a Guest Role Dramatic Series – The Jane Show episode "Rules of Engagement" – Nominated
- 2008 Canadian Comedy Award – Television – Pretty Funny Writing – Special or Episode – "This Hour Has 22 Minutes" episode 3 – Won
- 2008 Canadian Comedy Award – Performance – Pretty Funny Female Television Performance – "This Hour Has 22 Minutes" – Won
- 2008 Gemini Award for Best Ensemble Performance in a Comedy Program or Series – "This Hour Has 22 Minutes" – Nominated
- 2008 Gemini Award for Best Writing in a Comedy or Variety Program or Series – "This Hour Has 22 Minutes" – Nominated
- 2010 Canadian Comedy Award for Best performance by a Female – Television – "This Hour Has 22 Minutes" – Nominated
