= Erica Sigurdson =

Canadian comedian

Erica Sigurdson (born 1974) is a Canadian comedian and writer, who has been regularly featured on CBC Radio's radio show The Debaters. She won a Leo Award and has been nominated twice for a Canadian Comedy Award. She was also a semi-finalist in the Seattle International Comedy Competition.

When she was 10, Sigurdson was diagnosed with Type 1 diabetes. She graduated from Queen Elizabeth Secondary School in Surrey, British Columbia.

In 2005, she performed for the first time at Just for Laughs comedy festival in Montreal. She also performed stand-up comedy at the Kandahar Airfield in Afghanistan. In 2024, she toured as part of the Snowed In Comedy Tour, alongside Dan Quinn, Paul Myrehaug, and Pete Zedlacher.
