= Penelope Corrin =

Canadian actress and writer

- Born: Penelope Anne Corrin; 28 November 1975 (age 50); Ottawa, Ontario
- Occupations: actor, writer

Penelope Anne Corrin (born 28 November 1975) is a Canadian actress and writer.

Corrin was born in Ottawa, Ontario. She was seen nationally on CBC Television's Royal Canadian Air Farce comedy broadcasts for nine years, originally as a replacement cast member while Jessica Holmes was on maternity leave in 2006. Like Holmes, she attended Canterbury High School in Ottawa, then studied drama at the University of British Columbia. She lived in Vancouver for 12 years as a comedy performer and is a member of the Canadian Comedy Award winning sketch group Canadian Content. Corrin became a full-time member of the Air Farce team in October 2007 with the show now named, Air Farce Live.

She also appeared on the internationally distributed Stargate Atlantis television series as well as its parent series, Stargate SG-1.

In 2006, Corrin toured her own one-woman rock opera "Plugged" (music by Corinne Kessel) on the Fringe Festival circuit, with performances in Vancouver, Ottawa, Montreal and New York.

As a director, Corrin received a CTC Award nomination for her work with Pickled Productions' "The Book of Liz". In 2009, she directed a production of Hedwig and the Angry Inch in Toronto for Ghost Light Projects.
