= Double Exposure (comedy series) =

Canadian radio and TV show

Double Exposure was a Canadian radio and television comedy series which satirized contemporary Canadian politics. The show starred the married couple of Linda Cullen (born 1958) and Bob Robertson (1945–2017), and focused primarily on the stars' voice impersonations of Canadian political and cultural figures. In addition CBC staff announcer Bob Sharples provided the introductions and conclusions to Double Exposure shows and provided narration for many Double Exposure skits.

It played on CBC Radio (now known as CBC Radio One) at 11:33 on Saturday mornings and on CBC Stereo (now known as CBC Music) on Saturday evenings at 6:32 (one half-hour later in Newfoundland). Unlike many previous CBC radio comedies, such as The Royal Canadian Air Farce or Frantic Times, the show would be recorded wholly in a studio without a live audience. The duo made the jump to television with an initial satirical special in 1994, and became a television series in 1997.

== Radio show ==
The radio version of the show ran from 1986 to 1997 on CBC Radio. Prior to the launch of their own show, Robertson and Cullen were known as regular contributors of comedic sketches to Jack Farr's The Radio Show.

It satirized contemporary Canadian politicians such as Brian Mulroney, Joe Clark, Preston Manning, Barbara McDougall, Bill Vander Zalm and others, as well as international figures such as Margaret Thatcher. Robertson specialized in such impersonations as Bill Clinton, Ross Perot, John Major, and Queen Elizabeth, and Cullen could do imitations of Sandie Rinaldo, Princess Diana, Julia Child and Sister Wendy, among others.

Typical sketches on the radio show would include over-the-top impersonations of Brian Tobin rescuing frozen turbot from the dinner plate, or Preston Manning "ee-lim-inating" everything possible. Broadcaster Adrienne Clarkson was mocked by a parody of her diction and demeanour with the recurring catchphrase "I'm Adrienne Clarkson, and you're not", derived from Chevy Chase's early Saturday Night Live refrain. (Clarkson subsequently became Governor General of Canada near the end of Double Exposure's television run.)

In 1994 the show was named the best weekly network program on CBC Radio and Stereo. They also occasionally did special radio shows targeting specific Canadian political events, such as the 2000 Canadian federal election. They also won an ACTRA Award for best comedy, and were the highest-rated radio comedy program of the time.

== Television show ==
The duo did New Year's Eve television specials for several years beginning in 1994. In 1997, Double Exposure moved permanently to television, moving from CBC Television to rival network CTV until 2000. On radio, the show consisted of comedic sketches and monologues; on its CBC television specials, their voice impersonations were often set to actual film clips of the politicians being satirized. The weekly series on CTV featured the pair in live sketches as well.

== Other projects ==
In 2000, Double Exposure returned to CBC for a rare special radio program on the evening of the federal election.

In 2002, Cullen and Robertson joined with other comedians in the new satirical comedy series Point Blank, which aired on The Comedy Network. In November 2004, Cullen and Robertson were inducted into the BC Entertainment Hall of Fame.

On December 16, 2005, the Double Exposure team appeared on Lorne Elliott's show Madly Off in All Directions on CBC Radio One. This was their first appearance on CBC Radio in five years.

In 2008, Cullen and Robertson launched Gross National Product, a website which features satirical Flash animations.

In May 2009, they started blogging and podcasting.

From 2016 until Robertson's death in 2017, Cullen and Robertson produced and starred in Double Exposure's Newzapalooza, a weekly program for AMI-audio.

Jennifer Robertson, Robertson's daughter from his first marriage, is a comedian and actress, most noted for her role as Jocelyn Schitt in the situation comedy Schitt's Creek.

== Discography ==
	Title	Year
1st	The Best of Double Exposure: The Eighties - Part One	(1994)
2nd	More of the Best of Double Exposure	(1996)
3rd	Live at the Lamplighter CD: An Evening of Comedy with Double Exposure	(2005)
