= Don Ferguson (actor) =

Canadian actor, writer, and producer

- Born: May 30, 1946 (age 80); Montreal, Quebec, Canada
- Occupations: actor, writer, and producer
- Notable work: Royal Canadian Air Farce

Don Ferguson (born May 30, 1946) is a Canadian actor, writer, and producer and is one of the stars of the Royal Canadian Air Farce. He and Dave Broadfoot were the only Canadian-born original cast members of Air Farce. In 1998, Ferguson and the original Air Farce cast of Roger Abbott, Luba Goy, and John Morgan received the Governor General's Performing Arts Award for Lifetime Artistic Achievement, Canada's highest honour in the performing arts.

His many Air Farce roles included parodies of Paul Martin, Pierre Trudeau, Ron MacLean, Jack Layton, Joe Clark, Preston Manning, Stockwell Day, Rex Murphy, Lucien Bouchard, Bill Clinton, Brian Mulroney, Vladimir Putin, Bob Dylan, and Keith Richards. Many of these portrayals involve Ferguson as the 'straight man' to the more eccentric personalities played by Roger Abbott.

Don Ferguson is a graduate from Loyola High School, Loyola College, (now Concordia University), in Montreal, with an Honours English degree, and afterward worked in radio and as an audio-visual producer and photographer until he discovered that he preferred comedy writing and performing. He has written and directed documentary programs for CBC, a science-fantasy series for radio (″Johnny Chase″), a political farce for the stage, ("Skin Deep"), and a stage drama about the World War II raid of Dieppe.

Ferguson starred in the 2004 situation comedy pilot XPM. Ferguson was the owner and executive producer of Don Ferguson Productions from 2011 to 2021. In 2012 he produced Comedy Bar, a sketch comedy series for Bite TV. He previously produced a similar series, SketchCom, in the late 1990s. Ferguson was also a producer on the various Air Farce television series since 2004 and was the executive producer of the annual Air Farce New Year's Eve specials from 2010 until the final special in 2019. Most recently, he was executive producer and a story editor on the series Second Jen, which ran from 2016 to 2021.
