= Craig Lauzon =

Canadian comedian

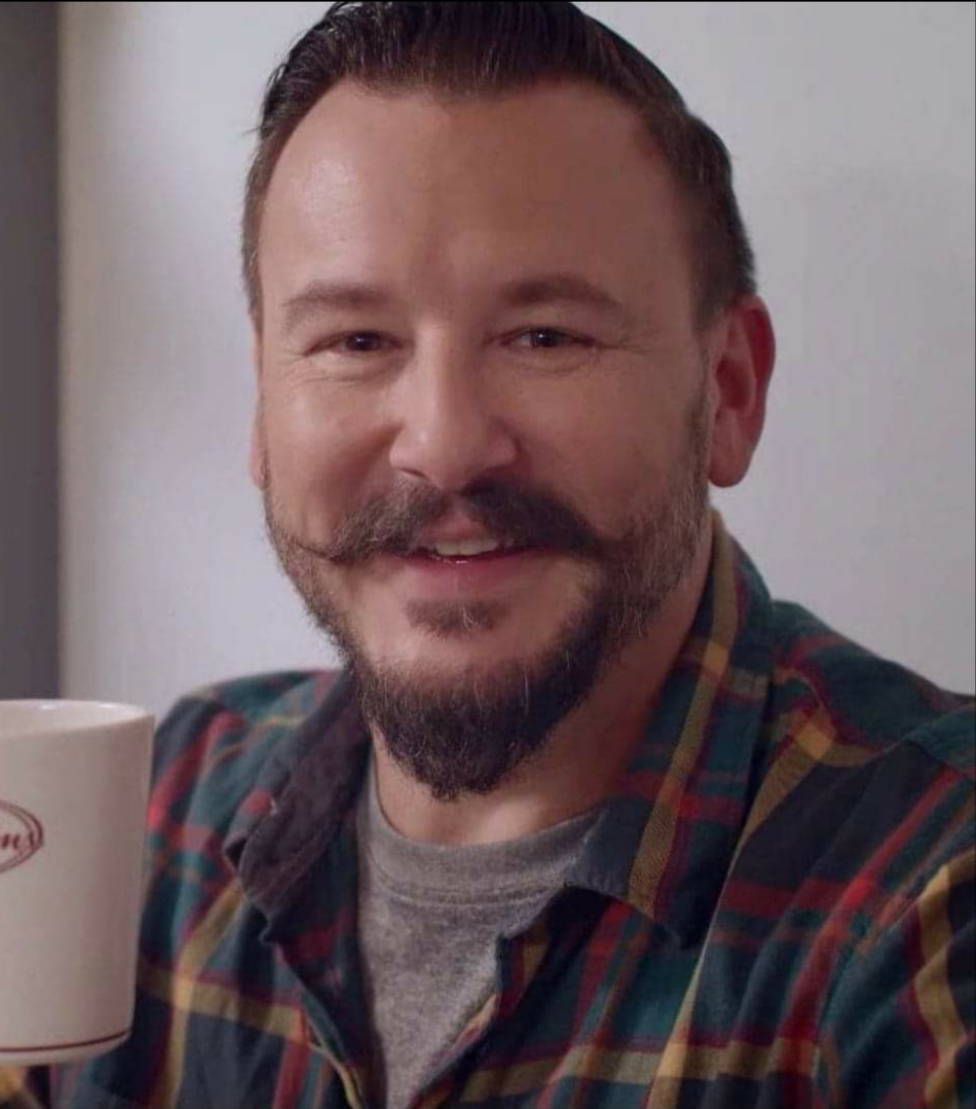
- Lauzon in 2018
- Born: February 3, 1971 (age 55); Ottawa, Ontario, Canada
- Occupations: Actor, comedian

Craig Lauzon is a Canadian actor, writer, and comedian. He is best known for his time as a member of the Royal Canadian Air Farce. His main caricatures on the Farce include George Stroumboulopoulos, John Baird, Justin Trudeau and Stephen Harper.

Born in Ottawa, Ontario, Lauzon is of English and Ojibwa descent.

He was formerly an artistic associate at Native Earth Performing Arts, Canada's oldest First Nations performing arts company. In 2011, he starred alongside Lorne Cardinal in a production of Kenneth T. Williams' Thunderstick, in which the two traded roles on alternate days. In 2012, he performed the role of Kent in an all-Aboriginal production of William Shakespeare's King Lear at the National Arts Centre, with a cast that also included August Schellenberg as Lear, Tantoo Cardinal as Regan, Jani Lauzon in a dual role as Cordelia and the Fool, and Billy Merasty as Gloucester.

His other credits include the films Ham & Cheese, Damaged Goods, Bull, Run Woman Run and The Great Salish Heist, the television series Trickster, and appearances on The Seán Cullen Show, The Ron James Show and Fool Canada.
