= Jessica Holmes (comedian) =

Canadian comedian and actress

- Born: August 29, 1973 (age 53); Ottawa, Ontario, Canada
- Education: Ryerson University (BFA)
- Occupations: actress, comedian, author, mental health advocate
- Spouse(s): Scott Yaphe (2002–present; 2 children)

Jessica Holmes (born August 29, 1973) is a Canadian comedian and actress. She is best known for her work with the show Royal Canadian Air Farce, which she joined in 2003, after starring in her own show, The Holmes Show in 2002.

== Early life and education ==
Born and raised in Ottawa, Canada, Holmes is the daughter of a feminist mother and a Mormon father. She joined the Church of Jesus Christ of Latter-day Saints (LDS Church) at age 19, and for 18 months she was a Mormon missionary in Venezuela. She is no longer a member of the LDS Church.

She attended Canterbury High School for the Performing Arts in Ottawa, majoring in Drama. Combining stand up, music and improvisation, she honed her skills and her improv team won Gold at the National High School Improv games.

Holmes moved to Toronto in 1993 to attend Ryerson University (now Toronto Metropolitan University) where she majored in writing in the Radio & Television Arts BFA program and spent her free time involved in comedy. She started acting in and then directing the annual sketch comedy show, titled RIOT. On a dare, she tried stand-up comedy and performed at amateur night at The Laugh Resort. After that she decided to try it on as a career.

After graduating, Holmes began performing stand-up and comedic monologues at local clubs. She was immediately recognized for her ability to transform herself into dozens of celebrity characters.

In 2024 she commenced her master's degree in Applied Positive Psychology from the University of East London. She credits positive psychology with playing a pivotal role in helping her thrive after depression.

== Career ==
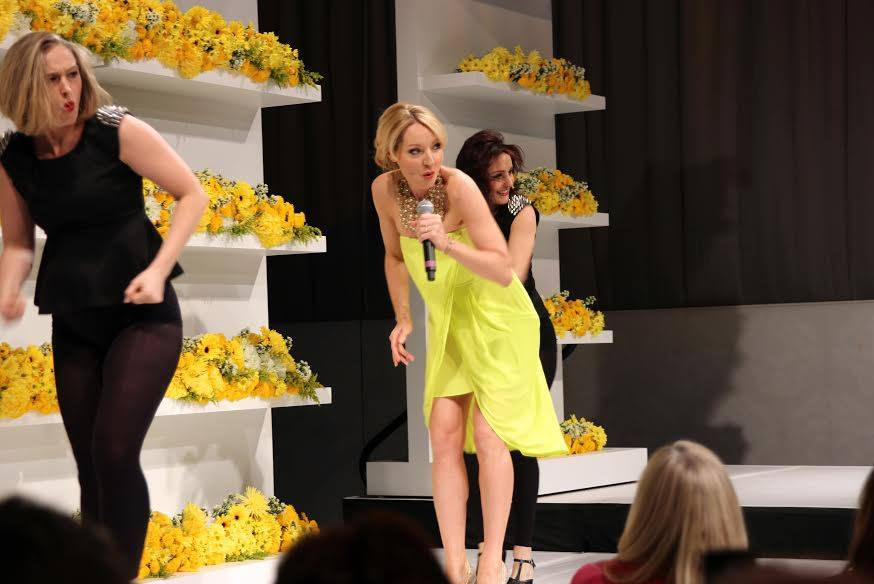

=== Actress and comedian ===
In 1999 Holmes landed several appearances at the Just for Laughs international comedy festival in Montreal. She joined Toronto's legendary Second City, where she co-wrote and performed in two shows.

During those years, she appeared on TV shows like History Bites (History Channel) and Laughing Matters, and starred in her first series entitled Little Big Kid on YTV. She was nominated for several 2000 and 2001 Canadian Comedy Awards for her TV and sketch comedy work.

Holmes co-wrote and starred in the Comedy Network series The Itch, and the CTV comedy/music series Sonic Temple. She went on to write and star in her own one-hour comedy special for CTV titled Holmes Alone. For the special, Holmes received a Gemini nomination as well as the Platinum Award at the Houston International Comedy Festival.

The success of Holmes Alone led to the creation of The Holmes Show, a Carol Burnett-style sketch comedy series on CTV and The Comedy Network involving edgy satire and celebrity parodies. It debuted in the Fall of 2002, lasting less than one season.

Holmes performed in the American films Citizen Duane and Welcome to Mooseport; and the television series Zoe Busiek: Wildcard.

That was followed by a few guest spots on Royal Canadian Air Farce, where she was invited to become the first "added" cast member since the show began 11 years earlier. She starred on the hit show for five years and participated in reunion specials.

On both The Holmes Show and Air Farce, she became well known for performing caricatures of various celebrities, including Celine Dion, Liza Minnelli, Geri Halliwell, and Britney Spears.

She also appeared in the television series XPM, Debra, That’s My DJ, and The Communist's Daughter (CBC Gem), for which she received a Canadian Screen Award nomination for Best Lead Performance in a Web Program or Series at the 10th Canadian Screen Awards in 2022.

On stage, Holmes has appeared in several Ross Petty's annual Christmas pantomime family musicals at the Toronto's Elgin Theatre, including Robin Hood, Wizard Of Oz, and Peter Pan.

As a comedian, Holmes has opened for Ellen DeGeneres, Russell Peters, Jerry Seinfeld, and Leslie Nielsen.

=== Author ===
Holmes’ first memoir, I Love Your Laugh: Finding the Light in My Screwball Life, was published by McClelland & Stewart in 2011.

Her second book, Depression The Comedy: A Tale of Perseverance, speaks of her journey with depression. It was named one of the top 25 books about mental health by Reader’s Digest and was named one of the top 40 books on mental health by Good Housekeeping.

=== Speaker and mental-health advocate ===
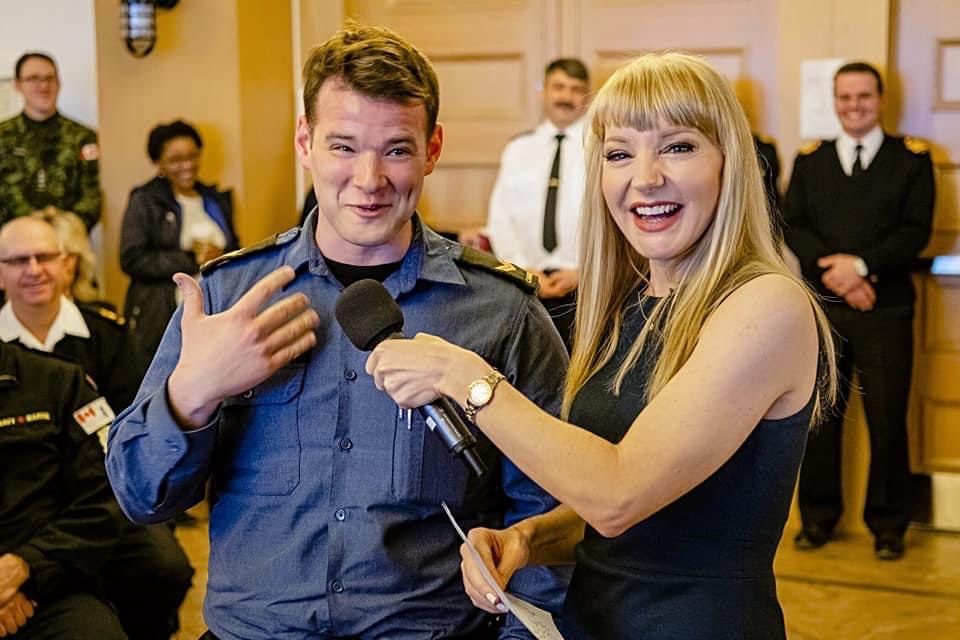

Holmes experienced postpartum depression after the birth of her second child, and once she recovered, she became trained as a Wellness & Life Coach through San Diego’s Life Purpose Institute.

In 2011 she developed a series of comedic keynotes on the subject of mental health and has performed them for numerous corporations.

As a speaker, she strives to help end the stigma around mental illness and in 2018 joined the Bell Let’s Talk team as a celebrity ambassador.

== Personal life ==
Holmes currently lives in Toronto with her actor husband Scott Yaphe and their two children Alexa and Jordan.

== Filmography ==
=== Film & Television ===
Year	Title	Role	Notes
1999-2000	Little Big Kid	Little Big Kid	
2000	The Itch	Tricia Farr	
2001	Sonic Temple	Various Characters	
2001	The Endless Grind	Various Characters	
2001	Holmes Alone	Herself	writer
2002	The Holmes Show	Herself	host
2001-2018	Royal Canadian Air Farce	Various Characters	Series regular
2003	Doc	Receptionist	
2004	Welcome to Mooseport	Dina	
2004	XMP	Jasmine	
2004	Wild Card	Rosie	
2005	Gruesomestein's Monsters	Bride	
2005	Burnt Toast	Leanne	
2006	The Shakespeare Comedy Show	Special Agent Elizabeth	
2006	Citizen Duane	Kim Vegas	
2006	Grossology	Scab Fairy	
2009	Da Kink in My Hair	Zoe	
2011	Moon Point	Eggs	
2011	The Adventures of Chuck & Friends	Miss Ella	
2011-2012	Debra	Gabby Lunsford	
2012	Winnipeg Comedy Festival 2011		writer
2013	The Hour	Herself - Panelist	
2014	That's My DJ	Debbie	
2018	The Social	Herself	
2021	The Communist's Daughter	Carol McDougald	
