= Alan Park =

Canadian comedian and political satirist (1962–2022)

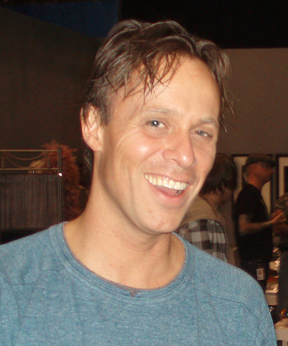
- Park in 2009
- Born: November 5, 1962; Scarborough, Ontario, Canada
- Died: November 10, 2022 (aged 60)
- Occupations: Comedian, political satirist

Alan John Park (November 5, 1962 – November 10, 2022) was a Canadian comedian and political satirist best known for his appearances on the Royal Canadian Air Farce where he gave humorous commentary on current events. Though originally not a caricaturist as were his Farce castmates, he developed portrayals of Canadian politicians such as Bloc Québécois leader Gilles Duceppe, Health Minister Tony Clement, Foreign Affairs minister Peter MacKay, as well as former Liberal leaders Stéphane Dion and Michael Ignatieff.

Foreign based political portrayals included Iranian leader Mahmoud Ahmadinejad, former US defense Secretary Donald Rumsfeld, and former U.S. president Barack Obama. Celebrity impressions included legendary folksinger Gordon Lightfoot, Boris Karloff, rock band Nickelback's front man Chad Kroeger, American stand-up comic and game show host Jeff Foxworthy, Kevin Federline, Peter O'Toole, Mick Jagger, Paul McCartney, Fred Durst and former pop superstar Cat Stevens.

Park's increased workload on the program resulted in nominations for both comedy writing as well as best male TV performance at the 2007 Canadian Comedy Awards.

Park also appeared on MuchMusic's Video on Trial.

Park was a member of the Atheists team on CBC Test the Nation: IQ broadcast live on January 24, 2010.

Park died after a long battle with cancer on November 10, 2022, at the age of 60.
