= Dave Broadfoot =

Canadian comedian and satirist

Dave Broadfoot OC (December 5, 1925 – November 1, 2016) was a Canadian comedian and satirist. He is best known for his performances as a member of the Royal Canadian Air Farce.

== Early life ==
Broadfoot was born in North Vancouver, British Columbia, to a religious family. He left high school in 1943 and joined the merchant navy, serving until 1947.

== Career ==
In the late 1940s, Broadfoot returned home and participated in community theatre in Vancouver, eventually gravitating towards comedy.

He moved to Toronto in 1952 and for ten years was a writer and performer in the stage revues Spring Thaw and The Big Review. In 1962, Spring Thaw had a run at the Hammersmith Theatre in London, England under the name Clap Hands, with a cast that included Broadfoot, Corinne Conley, Jack Creley and Eric Christmas.

In the 1950s and 1960s, Broadfoot appeared on several CBC television shows, including The Big Revue, the Wayne and Shuster Show, and Comedy Café, on the Ed Sullivan Show in the U.S. in 1955, and on radio with Funny You Should Say That. He also had occasional film roles in the early 1970s, including in the films Hold on to Daddy's Ears (Tiens-toi bien après les oreilles à papa), The Rebels (Quelques arpents de neige), Enuff Is Enuff (J'ai mon voyage!) and The Sloane Affair.

From 1973 to 1993 he was a member of the radio version of the Royal Canadian Air Farce. He retired from regular performing when the troupe moved to television, although he continued to appear on the show as an occasional guest star, including the TV series finale in 2008.

In addition to stand-up routines in the traditional format, Broadfoot created a number of recurring characters including, most notably:

- Big Bobby Clobber, a professional hockey player who seemed to have taken a few too many hits to his head or else was not very sharp to begin with.
- David J. Broadfoot, the Honourable Member of Parliament for Kicking Horse Pass, representing the New Apathetic Party. (Kicking Horse Pass is a mountain pass in the Canadian Rockies with a negligible population.)
- Sgt. Renfrew of the Royal Canadian Mounted Police (RCMP). Broadfoot performed this character for the RCMP on a number of occasions, receiving 'promotions' over the years. He was named an honorary Sergeant-Major. Broadfoot also wrote the scripts for a comic strip adaptation based on this character, which was drawn by Olga Urbansky in the late 1970s.

After leaving Air Farce, Broadfoot toured comedy clubs and appeared at the Just for Laughs festival. He starred in the 1998 comedy special, Old Enough To Say What I Want, and two years later in Old Dog, New Tricks, winning Gemini Awards for both.

Broadfoot also starred in the short-run sitcom XPM. He received several ACTRA and Juno awards and was an Officer of the Order of Canada. In 2003, Broadfoot received a Governor General's Performing Arts Award for Lifetime Artistic Achievement for his work in broadcasting. He wrote an autobiography, also entitled Old Enough to Say What I Want (ISBN 0-7710-1657-3). He retired in 2005. Beginning in 2006, the Canadian Comedy Awards gave the Dave Broadfoot Award for Special Achievement.

He also did voices for two animated Christmas specials, George and the Christmas Star and Bluetoes the Christmas Elf, and made a guest appearance as a hospital patient in the hit TV series, Puppets Who Kill. Broadfoot died on November 1, 2016, at the age of 90.
