= Luba Goy =

Canadian actress and comedian

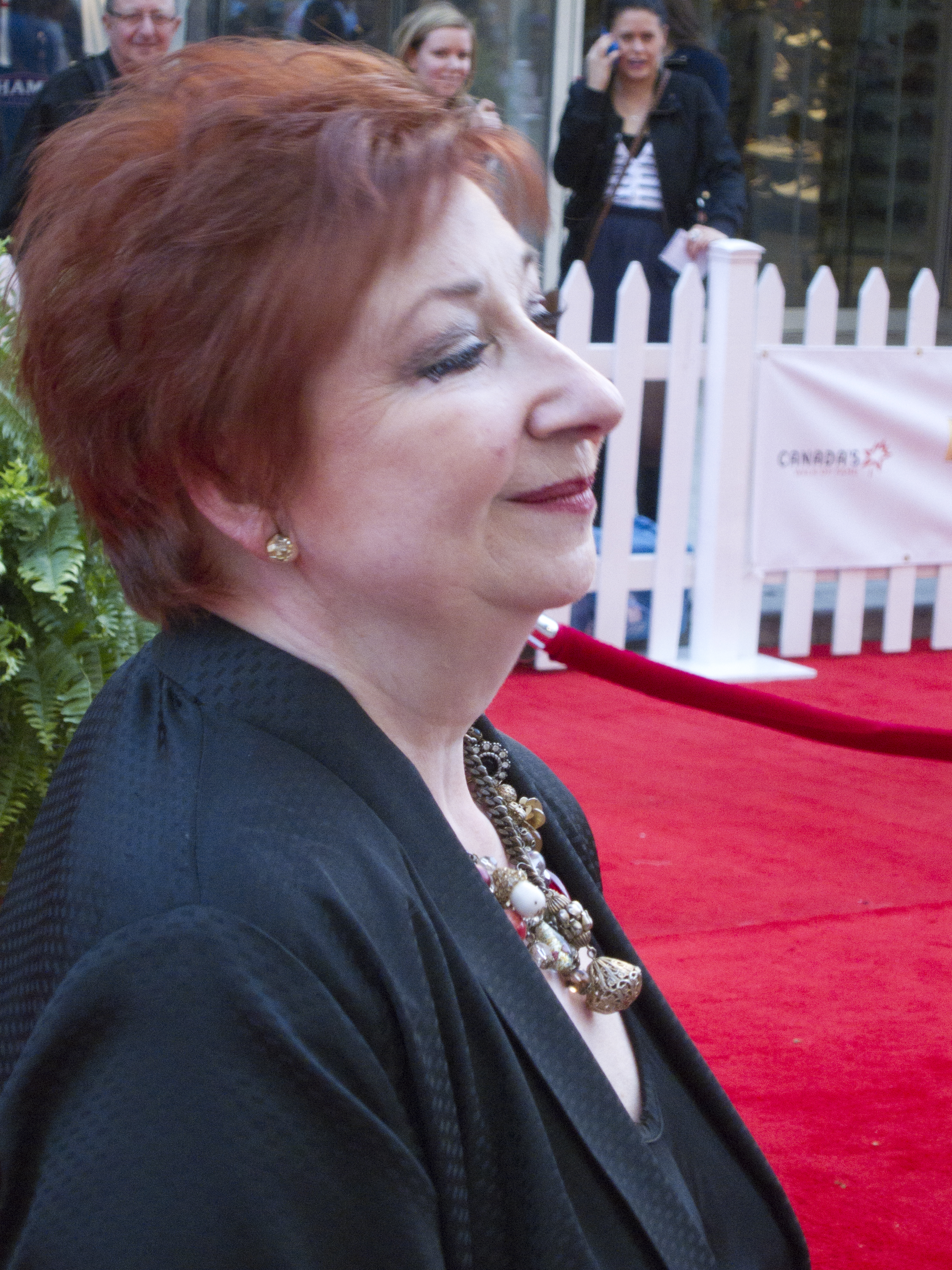
- Luba Goy at the 2010 Canada's Walk of Fame ceremony
- Born: November 8, 1945 (age 80); Haltern, Germany
- Education: National Theatre School of Canada
- Years active: 1970–present

Luba Goy (Ukrainian: Люба Ґой; born November 8, 1945) is a Canadian actress, comedian and one of the stars of Royal Canadian Air Farce.

== Life and career ==
Goy was born in Haltern, Germany, to Ukrainian parents; they immigrated to Canada in 1951 and she was raised in Ottawa, Ontario. She is a graduate of the Glebe Collegiate Institute in Ottawa, Ontario. In 1969, she graduated from the National Theatre School of Canada, then went on to act in theatre productions in Stratford, Ontario. In 1971, she joined "The Jest Society", a comedy troupe, which evolved into the Royal Canadian Air Farce in 1973. In the early 1980s, she starred (as herself, alongside Billy Van) in an educational series on computers called Bits and Bytes. Produced by TVOntario, the show was aired by PBS stations in the United States.

Later that decade, she played Lotsa Heart Elephant, Treat Heart Pig and Gentle Heart Lamb in Nelvana's animated Care Bears franchise. As part of the Air Farce team, Goy has won 15 ACTRA awards, a Juno, the Maclean's Honour Roll, and was among the first Canadians to be inducted into the International Humour Hall of Fame. In 1993, Goy and her Air Farce cast members received Honorary Doctor of Law degrees from Brock University. In 1996, Goy received the Outstanding Achievement Award from Women in Film and Television. In 1998, Goy, along with her Air Farce colleagues, received the Governor General's Performing Arts Award for Lifetime Artistic Achievement, Canada's highest honour in the performing arts.

She has also done voices for various animated TV series featuring The Elephant Show, Babar, AlfTales, My Pet Monster, Sylvanian Families, Tales from the Cryptkeeper, The Rosey and Buddy Show, Rupert, The New Archies, Little Shop, Jayce and the Wheeled Warriors, and Wild C.A.T.s.

Within the Ukrainian Canadian community she occasionally has comedy performances that highlight her Ukrainian heritage. One such example was her involvement in 1999 with the Ukrainian pavilion at Folklorama, a cultural festival in Winnipeg, Manitoba. She speaks Ukrainian fluently. Goy's film roles have included an 18th-century innkeeper in the Ukrainian film Vid'ma (Відьма, Witch), filmed in 1990 in Kyiv.

In 2011, she performed at the Toronto Ukrainian Festival. In May 2012 Goy debuted her one-person show Luba, Simply Luba at the Berkeley Street Theatre, Toronto. Goy has performed at the Riverdale Share concerts at the Danforth Music Hall and St Barnabas Church.

== Characters portrayed by Goy ==
- Yoko Ono
- Ann Medina
- Hillary Clinton
- Anne McLellan
- Rita MacNeil
- Ethel Blondin-Andrew
- Barbra Streisand
- Wendy Mesley
- Elizabeth II
- Alexa McDonough
- Pamela Wallin
- Sheila Copps
- Adrienne Clarkson
- Elizabeth Taylor
- Laura Bush
- Bev Oda
- Bobbie Battista
- Margaret Atwood
- Elizabeth May
- Rosa Parks
- Martha Stewart
- Suze Orman
- Lorena Bobbitt
- Kim Campbell
- Madeleine Albright
- Sharon Carstairs
- Donald Duck
- Anita Sarkeesian
- John Leguizamo
- Theresa May
- Bif Naked
- Eva Braun
- Michelle Obama

List is Incomplete

She also provided voices for the animated Care Bears characters Lotsa Heart Elephant, Treat Heart Pig and Gentle Heart Lamb.

== Filmography ==
=== Television ===
Year	Title	Role	Notes
1979	Read All About It - Season 1, Episode 4	Queen of Hearts	
1983	Bits and Bytes	Herself	Host
1993-2019	Royal Canadian Air Farce	Various roles	196 episodes

=== Film ===
Year	Title	Role	Notes
1986	Every Dog's Guide to Complete Home Safety	Honey	Voice
1991	Every Dog's Guide to the Playground	Honey	Voice
