= Bohemian Embassy =

Toronto coffeehouse (1960–1990s)

The Bohemian Embassy was a coffeehouse and cultural venue in Toronto, Canada, that opened in June 1960 and operated continually in different sites and formats until the early 1990s. Comedian and actor Don Cullen was associated with the establishment throughout its existence. Various aspects of culture were showcased, including jazz and folk music, poetry and theatre. The venue hosted performances by artists such as Milton Acorn, Margaret Atwood, sean o huigan, Sylvia Tyson, Gwendolyn MacEwen, David Essig, Martin Bronstein, Michael Boncoeur and Paul K. Willis. The legacy of the venue was examined in Bravo!'s 2010 documentary Behind the Bohemian Embassy. The "Bohemian Embassy" name has been appropriated by a condominium building in the Queen Street West area of Toronto, and a new wave rock group.

== Origins and St. Nicholas Street, 1960–1966 ==
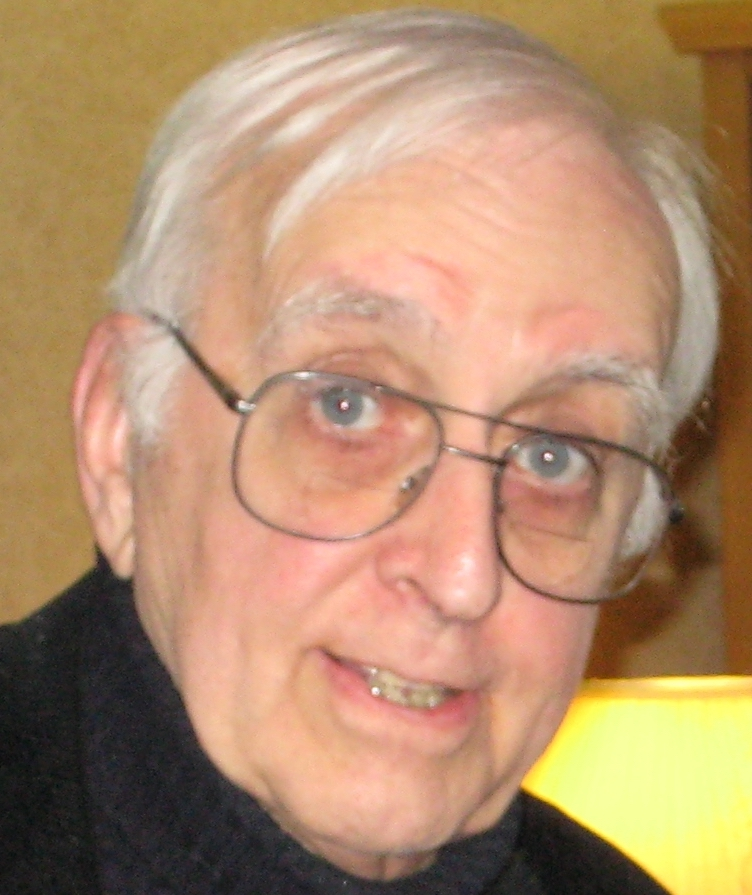
Don Cullen, founder of the Bohemian Embassy

The venture began when some junior CBC employees sought an alternative to the Celebrity Club, a gathering place across the street from the broadcaster's production centre on Jarvis Street. Five each put up one hundred dollars: Don Cullen, David Harriman, Ted Morris, Peter Oomen, and Steven Thomas Quance. Another, "Larry," had offered to match any contributions, but pulled out when his ideas for the venue did not match the plans for a cultural salon that Cullen proposed.

The partners rented a third-floor loft, in the 1907 William Wilson Livery Storage Building, at 7 St. Nicholas Street, a laneway running north of Wellesley Street and one short block west of Yonge Street. It was near the University of Toronto and on the edge of Toronto's bohemian enclave and art district, the Gerrard Street Village. The name, the Bohemian Embassy, had previously been given a flat that three young writers, Harriman, Warren Wilson, and Michael John Nimchuk, occupied nearby, at 590 Yonge. The venue walls were whitewashed, and the floor painted dark red, and the club was first equipped with two large coffee percolators, later leasing a Gaggia espresso machine, reputedly one of the first in Toronto. Membership cost twenty-five cents, and admission one dollar, and within one year the Bohemian Embassy reported a membership numbering about 3,000.

The Bohemian Embassy opened on June 1, 1960, the performers including folk singers Karen James and Bob Wowk, and a jazz duo, drummer Paul Neary, and reed player Brian Westwood. The two players then led groups in residence that played midnight sets on alternating Saturdays.

In its early years, the club at times attracted controversy. Less than a year after opening, it made headlines when Bell Telephone included the Bohemian Embassy in its Yellow Pages among "Consulates & Other Foreign Government Representatives". Over the first two and a half years, the Toronto police charged proprietors Cullen and Oomen four times with operating a public hall without a license. On the second occasion, in June 1961, poet John Higgins, writing for the organization, appealed to Queen Elizabeth II and Ontario premier Leslie Frost "for support, moral and otherwise ... to halt what now appears obvious and unwarranted persecution", and received a letter from the premier promising to "look into this matter and see what your problem is". After three previous acquittals, on November 29, 1962, charges were dismissed when it was determined that the facilities seated fewer than 100—the police said they counted 100–115 chairs; the owners maintained that there were 75, and benches that seated "18 people if they were all fat and 24 people if they were thin"—and thus that the public-hall law did not apply.

The Bohemian Embassy quickly became a key venue for Toronto's younger poets, musicians—principally folk, jazz, and blues—alternative theatre, and satirical revues. Generally, poetry was programmed on Thursday evenings, folk music on Fridays, jazz on Saturdays, including a midnight set, and a hootenanny on Sunday nights.

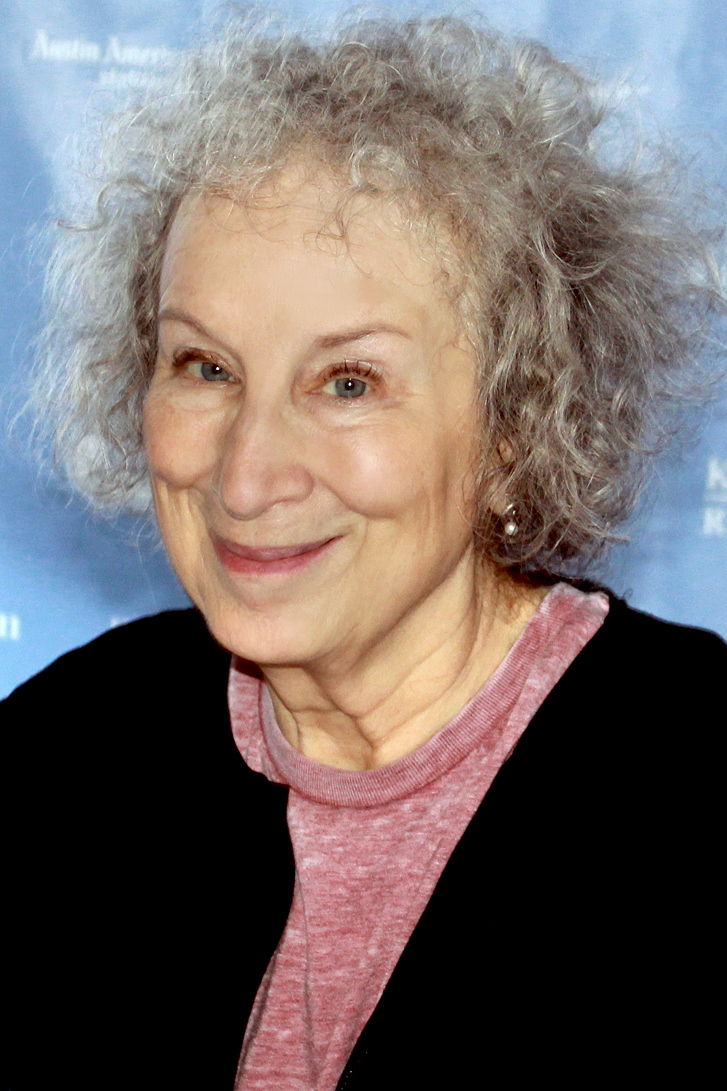
Margaret Atwood read her poetry at the Bohemian Embassy.

Poetry readings were frequently punctuated by musical performances. A November 1960 story in the Toronto Daily Star reported, in addition to a reading by Milton Acorn, "There were readings by two other poets, John Higgins and M. E. Atwood, barely out of their teens, and a copious and very Celtic bout of folk singing by Sylvia Fricker", referring to Margaret Atwood, the future sean o huigan, and, after she married her musical collaborator in the duo Ian and Sylvia, Sylvia Tyson. That evening also included poetry from Gwendolyn MacEwen, a talk on commercialism and art by Libby Jones, a stripper then also appearing at the Lux burlesque house.

Gwendolyn MacEwen began reading her poetry at the Bohemian Embassy while she too was still a teenager. Other younger poets associated with the club included George Miller, Dennis Lee, and John Robert Colombo, who organized the poetry reading series. As well, the venue attracted poets of earlier generations, including James Reaney, Phyllis Webb, Margaret Avison, Al Purdy, and Jay Macpherson, and Raymond Souster ran poetry workshops at the club.

Folk music was a mainstay of the Bohemian Embassy, and, as a popular trend of the moment, a money-maker. Mary Jane and Winston Young had a Friday-night residency for several years. In addition to Sylvia Fricker's regular appearances, Ian and Sylvia later performed regularly, once bringing their manager-to-be Albert Grossman to hear them play a set. Gordon Lightfoot appeared when playing in a duo called the Two Tones. While still a student, Amos Garrett accompanied Embassy regular, folk singer Chick Roberts, and they soon joined with Carol Robinson, who appeared in revues at the club, and Jim McCarthy to form a band, the Dirty Shames. The Halifax Three, featuring Denny Doherty, played the club, while in Toronto adding guitarist Zal Yanovsky to the lineup. They later joined forces with Cass Elliot in a group called the Mugwumps, which led Doherty into the Mamas and the Papas and Yanovsky to the Lovin' Spoonful. A few years into the coffeehouse's life on St. Nicholas, responsibility for booking folk music was given to Mitch Podolak, later co-founder of the Winnipeg Folk Festival, and he signed Joni Mitchell to perform at the Embassy.

In addition to burgeoning, homegrown Canadian talent, the Bohemian Embassy was a Toronto venue for higher-profile performers, often booked to play Wednesdays through Sundays. Included among those from the United States, were the Rev. Gary Davis, Mike Seeger, and Len Chandler. Performing from Canadian was Bonnie Dobson. Bob Dylan once appeared for a poetry evening and offered to perform, but the organizer of the evening declined.

On January 10, 1963, a "happening" took place at the Bohemian Embassy. Reputedly Toronto's first, its novelty attracted CBC television, for a feature broadcast on the local program, Close-Up. A later account reported that the event had been suggested by the CBC producers, who "had heard Happenings were the thing in New York's Village and wanted one to photograph closer to home". A bathtub served as a motif for the performance, which featured "folk singing, poets reading works that were inspired by the bathtub and humorous skits", according to a Toronto Star reviewer. He found the evening "an amateur show" and "not a success", also reporting that co-proprietor Don Cullen, who arranged the program, agreed.

The Bohemian Embassy served as a venue for a wide variety of small-scale, limited-budget theatre. A November 1960 evening included a "world premiere" reading of Charles Sangster's 1856 play, Bertram and Lorenzo, while a March 1961 program included Ionesco's Jack, or the Submission. And a 1964 production of Look Back in Anger staged there cost a reported eight dollars. Other productions, by local writers, included a pair of one-act plays by John Herbert, Private Club and A Household God, scheduled to be staged in autumn 1962, and an early play by David French, A Ring for Florrie, presented in November 1963, on a bill with David, a three-scene piece by, and featuring, comedian Eve Law. About both the latter shows, influential critic Nathan Cohen wrote, "The ideas are interesting, but the plays and their production are disasters". Earlier that year, in May 1963, it had been the venue for an ill-attended chamber opera, Balloon, by composer Henry Papale and librettist and featured tenor Daniel Pociernicki, about which critic John Kraglund judged "there was much to admire". Late in 1963, in December, while also playing across town at the Crest theatre, Jackie Burroughs was scheduled to appear in a program of the Theatre of the Absurd.

A stage production to emerge from the Bohemian Embassy that had a sustained history was the Village Revue, a satirical program originated by Barrie Baldaro and Ralph Hicklin. The first edition opened February 27, 1961. It featured a cast of eleven, including Baldaro and Hicklin, fellow writers Eve Law and Wayne McLaren, and Kathy Greenwood, Eliza Creighton, Gabrielle Thibault, folk singer Klaas Van Graft, Michael Farnell, Embassy regular George Miller, and the club's co-owner Don Cullen, who was asked to join the cast because he could do a Russian accent. Scheduled to run three nights, and with two enthusiastic notices in the Toronto Daily Star, including Cohen's, the first Village Revue was held over, transferring to another coffeehouse, the House of Hambourg, late in March and running until April 8.

A second edition opened September 1, 1961, with many of the same cast members, though now including Carol Robinson and without Ralph Hicklin's participation, and was presented at Centre Stage, a proper theatrical venue, not at the coffeehouse. It met with disappointed critical reception, Wendy Michener stating that the virtues of its original makeshift production and intimate setting had been lost. The Revue returned to St. Nicholas Street for its third edition, in April 1962, with a smaller cast, playing four weeks, and earning positive notices from top-rung critics Cohen and Herbert Whittaker of the Globe and Mail. Except for a summer 1963 edition presented at the Theatre at the Dell, the upstairs lounge of the Dell Tavern, the Village Revue was largely based at the Bohemian Embassy. A 1965 edition, devised and starring only Baldaro and Cullen, opened there, and then transferred to the Colonnade Theatre in October, when the club was in its last year of operation in the St. Nicholas loft.

In 1964, Don Cullen was cast in a revival of the British satirical revue, Beyond the Fringe, and in other ventures that took him away from Toronto. He and Peter Oomen had been left to run the club, the other three original investors having departed within the first year of operation. When Cullen returned in 1965, they attracted eight new investors, who subsequently determined that the Bohemian Embassy should have a manager, and another former CBC editor, Peter Churchill, was given the job. The venue, however, continued to operate for only two more months, a victim of changing times and tastes. According to a contemporary report, "the Bohemian Embassy changed from being off-beat and far out to being square and passé. It was conceived in the Kingston Trio era; it began to fade with the dawning of the Beatles", and the growing hippie subculture supplanted the Beat ethos of the club, which closed at the St. Nicholas Street location in June 1966, six years to the day from its opening.

== Rochdale College, December 1969 – January 1970 ==
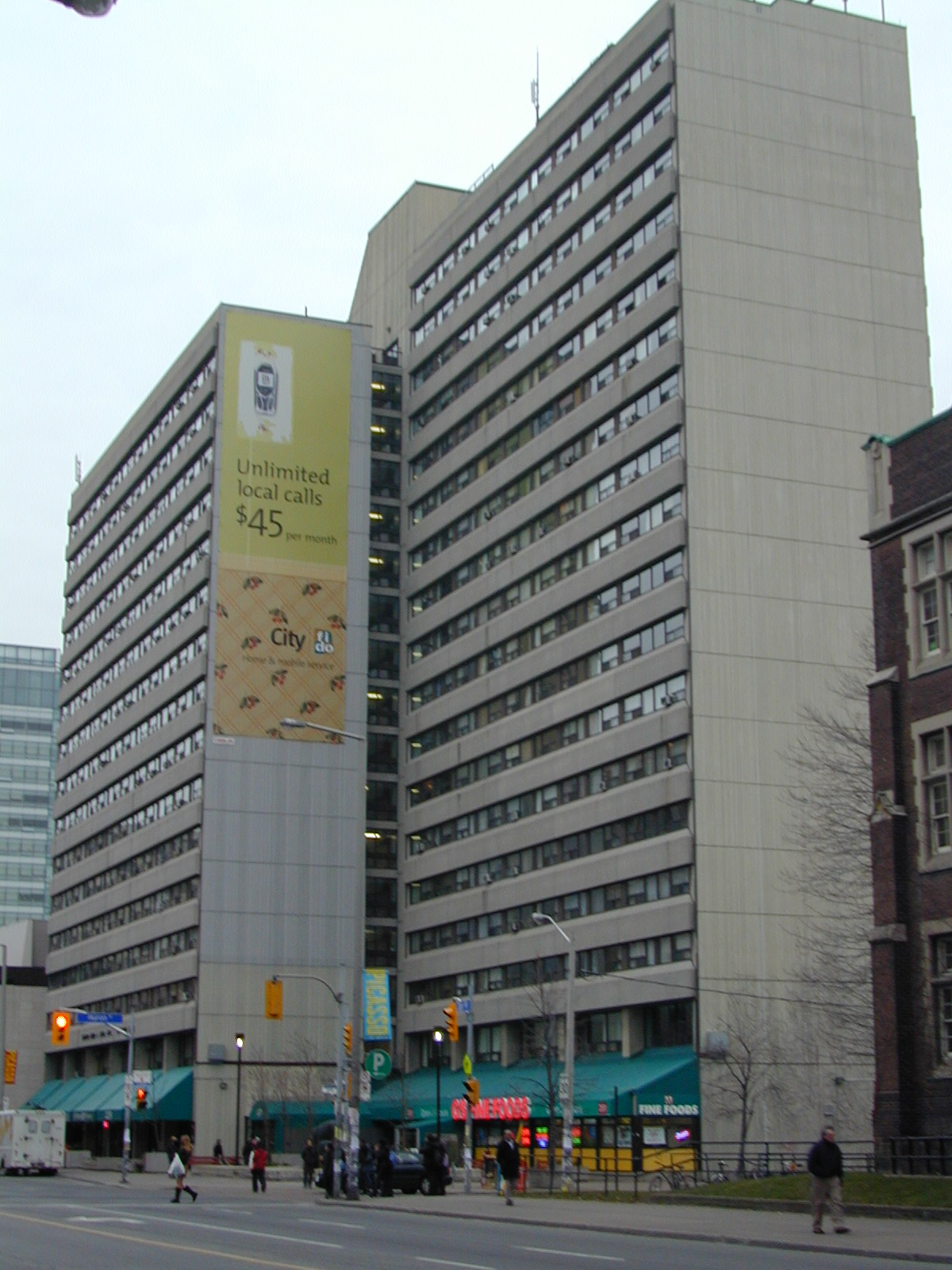
The former Rochdale College building

Cullen, with partner Don Black, revived the Bohemian Embassy in December 1969, in the former premises of the Same restaurant, at Rochdale College, 341 Bloor Street West, at Huron Street. They planned to run a pilot program of two weeks, and then decide whether to re-open on a more permanent basis. Presentations included open poetry readings, a sitar performance, New Orleans jazz, a hootenanny with the Travellers, and a chamber-music performance that Cullen remembered as receiving a "terrible response". He also recalled receiving, on New Year's Eve, "gifts ... in the form of pills, of varying colours and dimensions", more consistent with Rochdale as a Toronto drug centre. Never wishing the venue to be associated with that part of the counterculture, this confirmed their decision to end the pilot and close this version of the Bohemian Embassy.

== Harbourfront Centre, July 1974 – March 1976 ==
The Bohemian Embassy returned as a venue within Harbourfront Centre, a cultural and recreational site on the Toronto waterfront. Established as Harbourfront Passage, a pedestrian walkway, by the Government of Canada in 1972, in 1974, billed as Harbourfront '74, it started to offer programs of entertainment and recreation. Don Cullen had been invited to revive the Bohemian Embassy, accepting the offer on condition that it include Roy Wordsworth, a fellow performer in Beyond the Fringe, for his management skills.

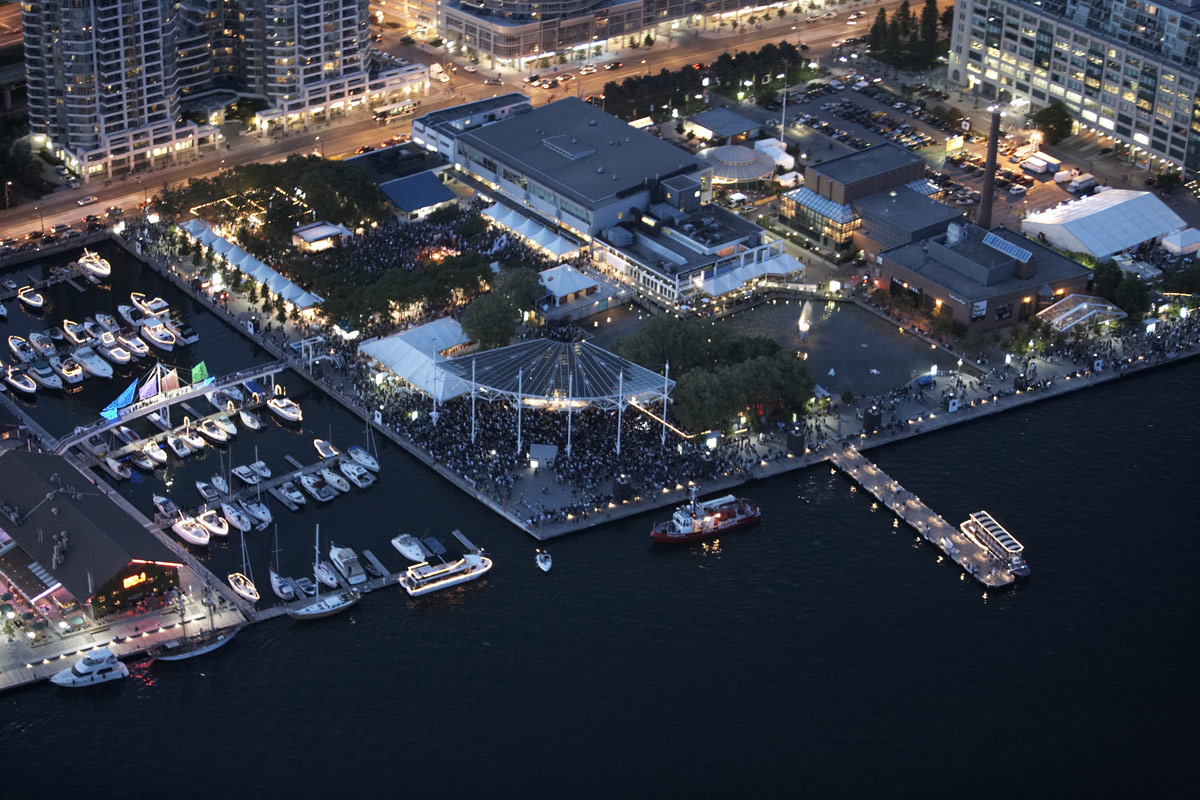
Harbourfront Centre

Located in the York Quay building, the first operational area of the development, the Bohemian Embassy was to open on June 15, 1974, with a performance by Gordon Lightfoot. Construction was delayed, however, and he could not reschedule for the new opening date of July 1. Programming was similar to the plan for the original club, with different types of performance each night of the week—Tuesdays, poetry; Wednesdays, theatre and dance; Thursdays, chamber music; Fridays, rock, with late-night jazz; Saturday folk music and hootenannys; and Sundays, comedy—but capacity was considerably greater, seating 500. Among the performers on the first weekend July 5–7: jazz musician Cathy Moses, folk musicians David Essig, Ginger Graham, and Tom Gallant, and a comedy revue featuring Martin Bronstein, Carol Robinson, and Don Cullen and the Accents. A mid-July advertisement let nightowls know about after-hours jazz, every Friday night (meaning Saturday morning), 1:15–4:00 am.

Like its earlier version, the new Bohemian Embassy helped launch talent, some featured regularly at Harbourfront. Comedy nights regularly programmed a troupe called Comedy Crisis, including Ben Gordon, and the innovative double act of Michael Boncoeur and Paul K. Willis, known as La Troupe Grotesque. Folk musicians Patricia Watson and Alison Reynolds, who came from Sudbury, Ontario, appeared regularly, as did singer-songwriters Nancy White, who soon started to perform her satirical songs weekly on CBC radio's Sunday Morning, and Raffi Cavoukian, soon to be well known, by his first name, as a children's performer.

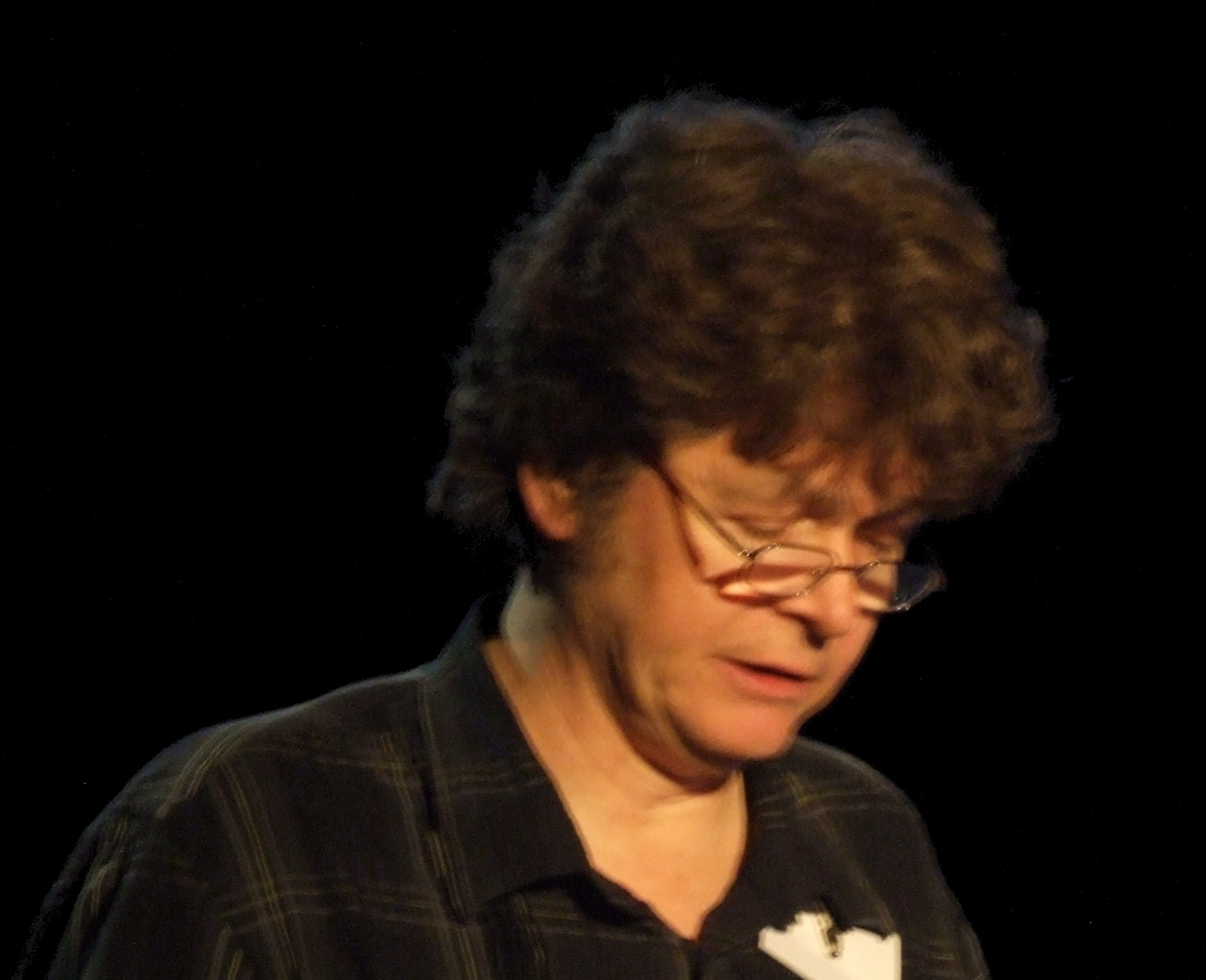
Robert Priest read his poetry at the Bohemian Embassy.

Poetry nights, again initially programmed by John Robert Colombo, provided a venue for younger writers, such as Pier Giorgio Di Cicco, who was later named Toronto's Poet Laureate, and Robert Priest. Another distinctive poetic voice was Hans Jewinski, a Toronto police officer who published his first collection in 1975, with an accompanying reading at the Embassy.

As well, some who started as programmers became more notable as impresarios in their own right. Because of other commitments, Colombo decided to step back, and Greg Gatenby was hired as a replacement, later to expand his portfolio by starting the Toronto International Festival of Authors. Similarly, Mark Breslin started as an announcer and host for open-talent nights, and he soon took on other programming responsibilities, and shortly established the nightclub Yuk Yuk's, the foundation for a Canadian comedy regime.

Funded by federal money, the Bohemian Embassy offered its programs free of charge, and was the most popular of Harbourfront's operations. Program director Cullen estimated that it attracted about 500 each weekend night, and 150 to 200 on Wednesdays and Thursdays. By spring 1975, however, with administrative changes at Harbourfront, cuts in funding and in programming followed. Having started with an annual budget of $100,000, Cullen reported that by 1976 he was having to operate on $500 a week, but the venue stayed open until spring 1976. Discussions about alternative funding included paid admissions and sponsorships by tobacco or beer companies, but the Harbourfront board ruled out the former, and Cullen resisted the latter, seeing the ironies in that type of support for a coffeehouse. Saturday, March 27, 1976, on the venue's final weekend, featured a twelve-hour concert of folk, country, and bluegrass music, to benefit the radio station CJRT-FM, that attracted a total audience of about 1,000. Staff contracts expired on March 31, 1976, and were not renewed, and this incarnation of the Bohemian Embassy closed that Wednesday night.

== On the air, 1976 and 1979 ==
A few months after the Harbourfront venue closed, Don Cullen hosted a television edition of the Bohemian Embassy, as an episode of the Global Television variety series, Caught in the Act. (In 1974, Cullen had worked for Global, as a writer on another variety show, Everything Goes.) The network advertised it as "free-spirited entertainment", and the Toronto Star found it "low-key with spots of dry humor from Cullen as host", adding, "The players are all clean and neat and professionally good, and except for poet Irving Layton's preoccupation with fornication in his readings near the end, they're all conventional, too. No wild-eyed hippies here". Airing on Friday, November 26, 1976, at 9:30 pm, with a repeat on Sunday at 9:00, it evidently served as a pilot for a series that did not result.

The Bohemian Embassy returned to the air on April 7, 1979, with a CBC radio series, The Bohemian Embassy. The one-hour program was recorded on Mondays, with an audience, at the CBC's Cabbagetown studio, 509 Parliament Street, and broadcast on CBL, the Toronto AM station, Saturdays at 8:00 pm. Mary MacFadyen produced the program, which Cullen hosted, with announcer John O'Leary, and music by jazz trombonist Rob McConnell and his quartet. Guests including familiar voices, such as writers John Robert Colombo, George Miller, and Margaret Atwood, as well as an array of musicians over the weeks, but also an eclectic selection of other entertainment, announcing itself at one point as a program of "folk music, comedy and magicians", and, on the November 17 edition, featuring the National Tap Dance Company's rendition of a Bach Brandenburg Concerto. A regular notice in the Toronto Star calling for audience members to attend tapings appeared as late as February 1980, but according to published radio listings, the last broadcast was December 29, 1979, and the time slot was ceded to Jazz After Eight.

== 318 Queen Street West, June 1991 – May 1992 ==
The Bohemian Embassy returned as a physical venue in 1991, in a second-floor loft on Queen Street West, then a hub of Toronto's art and music scene. Cullen collaborated with Embassy habitué George Miller, singer-songwriter Michal Hasek, classical musician Eun-Jung Yoo, and stage manager Dan O'Reilly to start the new enterprise. "Sometimes it's necessary to go back to square one and community in the arts", Cullen explained. "Arts funding is down so I did something positive and reopened the Bohemian Embassy to have an outlet for a gentler and more vulnerable form of artistic expression that doesn't compete with alcohol." When John Robert Colombo declined to participate due to other commitments, Cullen engaged librarian Anita Keller as literary curator of Thursday readings, which usually featured a known author and a set with unpublished writers.

The performance space, which seated a reported 275, opened on June 20, 1991, with a cover charge of five dollars, for a reading by Al Purdy. Other veteran writers read there, including an evening in August 1991, when Margaret Atwood launched her book Wilderness Tips, that turned away about 150, but programming overall stressed younger and newer talent.

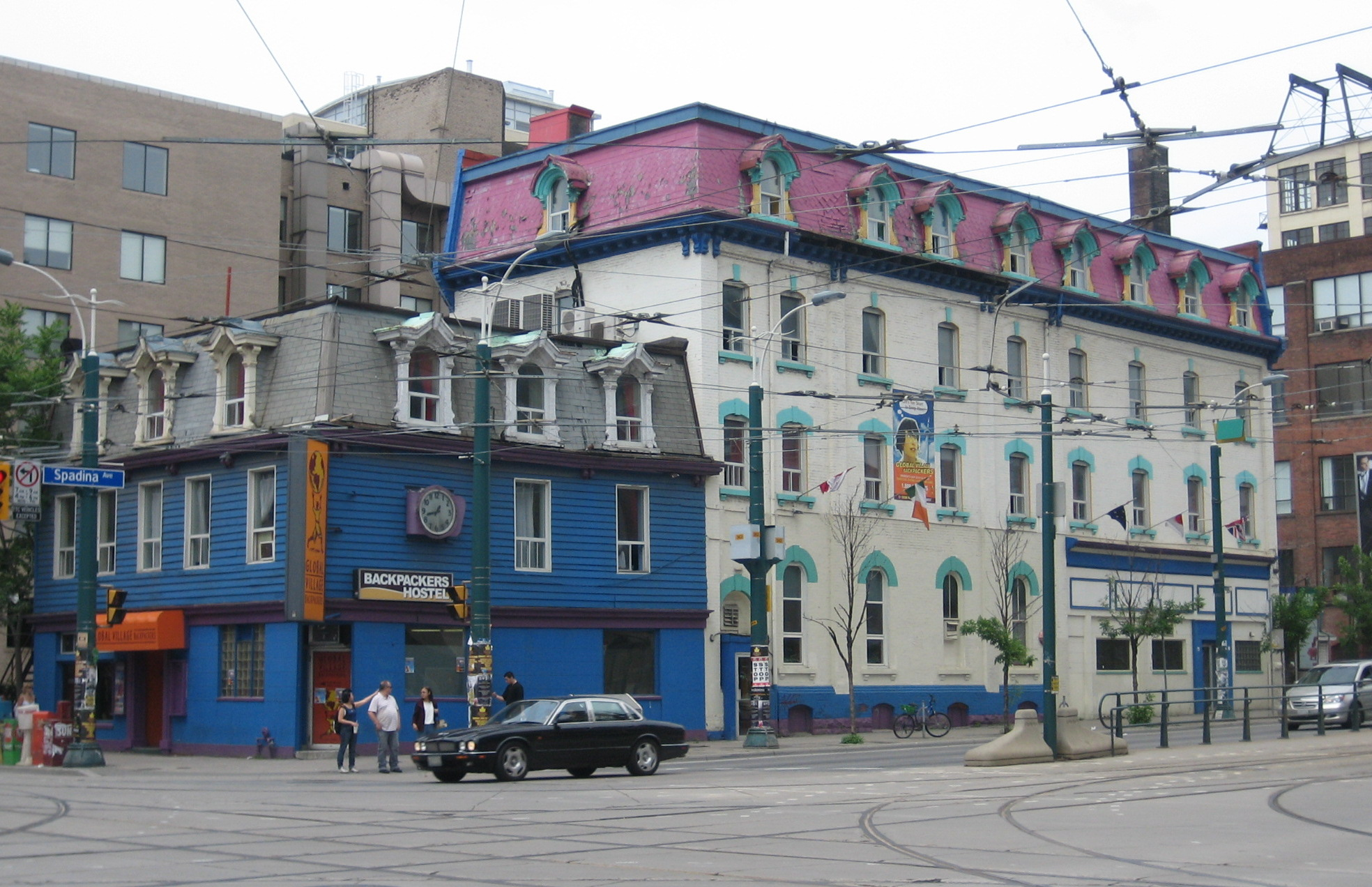
Spadina Hotel

When the lease expired, after less than a year of operation, the Embassy closed, on May 9, 1992. Keller moved the reading series to the Spadina Hotel, and, optimistically, Cullen claimed that he was seeking a new location, but this turned out to be the final edition of the Bohemian Embassy as a coffeehouse and site of cultural production.

== The Bohemian Embassy condominium controversy, 2006–07 ==
In 2006, Baywood Homes began developing a condominium complex to be called the Bohemian Embassy, on Queen Street West, at Gladstone Avenue. The district, known as West Queen West, had evolved to contain art galleries, trendy shops and restaurants, and renovated establishments, such as the Gladstone Hotel and the Drake Hotel, that marked the area as culturally rich. The condominium was to comprise 345 residential units in a nine-storey building on the street and a nineteen-storey structure set behind the lower one, back from Queen Street. The project attracted controversy for its appropriation of the name, which the developers used to market properties to what they described as "first-time buyers and well established people who work in the financial district", but which was also branded as "a condominium so stylish and cool, it promises to redefine the way this city's hipsters live". Michael Toke, an artist in the neighborhood, protested against the development with an installation and video project that parodied the developers' advertising, called Bohemian Embarrassment. The project attracted criticism from at least two prominent critics of architecture and planning in Toronto, John Bentley Mays of the Globe and Mail and the Toronto Star's Christopher Hume, for the design of the buildings and their scale, in that area of the city, as well as for the marketing approach.

Don Cullen, claiming the Bohemian Embassy brand, offered the developers the use of the name in return for $1,400 per month for five years, with $1,000 to go toward musical and literary events, which he would organize, keeping "$100 a week for my troubles". He added, "the developer's lawyer claimed I didn't have a leg to stand on". Recounting the achievements of his coffeehouse, he concluded, "the Bohemian Embassy was a lot of things, launched a lot of careers, but it never had much of anything to do with condos".

The Bohemian Embassy condominium stands at 1169 and 1171 Queen Street West.

== Later activities and legacy ==
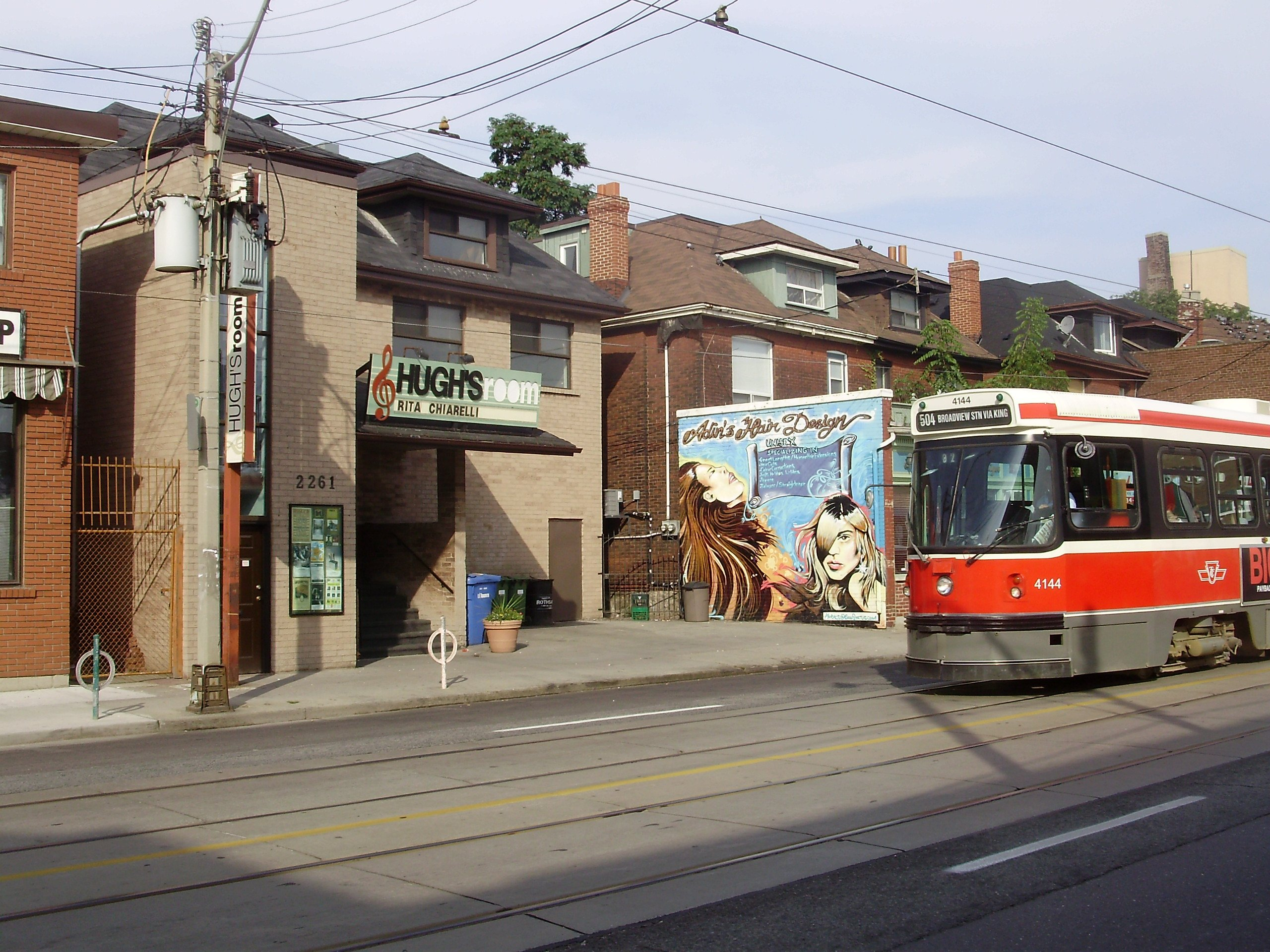
Hugh's Room

Since the Queen Street location closed, there have been a number of reunions and other events honoring the Bohemian Embassy, often hosted by Don Cullen. He presented evenings remembering the venue on June 22, 2001, at the Rhino Bar, in West Queen West, and on July 10, 2002, at the Victory Café, on Markham Street, in Mirvish Village. Another followed the next year, on September 13, 2003, at Hugh's Room, on Dundas Street West. The earlier events had presented younger talent, but this was more of an actual reunion, with George Miller, John Robert Colombo, Sharon Hampson and Bram Morrison, and Peter Kastner joining Cullen on stage. Several years later, in 2009, Lit City, a literary festival marking Toronto's 175th birthday, included the "Bohemian Embassy Revival", a program at the City Hall library that presented, in addition to Cullen, Colombo, Greg Gatenby, Rosemary Sullivan, Dennis Lee, and Sylvia Tyson.

On June 22, 2002, Mariposa in the City, a Toronto event of the Mariposa Folk Festival, included a spoken-word program, with Cullen, named for the Bohemian Embassy. As well, one of the performance areas at the annual festival in Orillia, Ontario, is called the Bohemian Embassy Stage.

In 2007, Cullen published a memoir, The Bohemian Embassy; Memories and Poems, and in 2010 Behind the Bohemian Embassy, a feature-length documentary about "Canada's wordiest landmark", was released and broadcast on the Bravo! television service, on July 19 of that year.

A musical group named The Bohemian Embassy, describing itself as "a psychedelic alternative rock band from the south west of England," was formed in the late 2000s.

== Sources ==
- Cullen, Don (2007a). The Bohemian Embassy: Memories and Poems. Hamilton, Ontario: Wolsak & Wynn. ISBN 978-1-894987-10-3.
