= Lynn Johnston bibliography =

This is a list of works by Lynn Johnston, Canadian cartoonist.

== Bibliography ==
=== Pre-For Better or For Worse works ===
- David, We're Pregnant! (1973)
- Hi Mom! Hi Dad! (1975)
- Do They Ever Grow Up? : 101 Cartoons About the Terrible Twos and Beyond (1978) ISBN 0-7737-1026-4

=== For Better or For Worse collections ===
==== Strip collections ====
These collections, published by Andrews & McMeel, contains reprints of the comic almost as it appeared in the daily newspapers. Although, many of the early books such as Keep the Home Fries Burning and It's All Downhill From Here do not contain Sunday strips. The Sunday collections cover Sundays up until around 1985. However the Sundays from around 1986-87 were not published in an FBorFW collection. You can find them all at fborfw.com. They are listed in chronological order; each book spans about a year in time. They lag approximately two years behind the strips' original publication. For example, She's Turning Into One Of Them! was published in 2006, containing strips dealing with April's 13th birthday in 2004 (publication date shown in parentheses). Michael and Deanna's wedding in the book With This Ring was published in 2003, two years after their 2001 wedding.

1. I've Got the One-More-Washload Blues... (Aug 1981) ISBN 0-8362-1166-9
2. Is This "One of Those Days," Daddy? (Aug 1982) ISBN 0-8362-1197-9
3. It Must Be Nice to Be Little (Aug 1983) ISBN 0-8362-1113-8
4. Just One More Hug (Aug 1984) ISBN 0-8362-2054-4
5. The Last Straw (Aug 1985) ISBN 0-8362-2070-6
6. Keep the Home Fries Burning (July 1986) ISBN 0-8362-2080-3
7. It's All Downhill from Here (July 1987) ISBN 0-8362-2093-5
8. Pushing 40 (Sept 1988) ISBN 0-8362-1807-8
9. A Teenager in the House (Sept 1989) (Included in A Look Inside)
10. If This is a Lecture, How Long Will It Be? (Sept 1990) ISBN 0-8362-1821-3
11. What, Me Pregnant? (Sept 1991) ISBN 0-8362-1876-0
12. Things Are Looking Up... (Aug 1992) ISBN 0-8362-1892-2
13. There Goes My Baby! (Aug 1993) ISBN 0-8362-1723-3
14. That's Not How They Do It on TV! (Aug 1994) (included in It's The Thought That Counts)
15. Starting from Scratch (Aug 1995) ISBN 0-8362-0424-7
16. Love Just Screws Everything Up (Aug 1996) ISBN 0-8362-2128-1
17. Growing Like a Weed (Oct 1997) ISBN 0-8362-3685-8
18. Middle Age Spread (Aug 1998) ISBN 0-8362-6822-9
19. Sunshine and Shadow (Aug 1999) ISBN 0-7407-0200-9
20. The Big 5-0 (Aug 2000) ISBN 0-7407-0556-3
21. Graduation: A Time for Change (Aug 2001) ISBN 0-7407-1844-4
22. Family Business (Aug 2002) ISBN 0-7407-2669-2
23. With This Ring (April 2003) ISBN 0-7407-3412-1
24. Reality Check (Aug 2003) ISBN 0-7407-3810-0
25. Striking a Chord (March 2005) ISBN 0-7407-5315-0
26. Never Wink at a Worried Woman (Oct 2005) ISBN 0-7407-5444-0
27. She's Turning Into One of Them! (Aug 2006) ISBN 0-7407-5815-2
28. Teaching... is a Learning Experience (March 2007) ISBN 0-7407-6354-7
29. Senior's Discount (Sept 2007) ISBN 0-7407-6354-7 / ISBN 978-0-7407-6354-0
30. Home Sweat Home (April 2008) ISBN 0-7407-7096-9 / ISBN 978-0-7407-7096-8
31. Just a Simple Wedding (March 2009) ISBN 0-7407-8097-2 / ISBN 978-0-7407-8097-4

==== Treasury collections ====
In 2010 Andrews McMeel began publishing Treasury collections of Johnston's work. The collections include reprints of the original strips and the new-run strips from 2008 onwards. Various strips include insights written by Johnston about the inspiration for a strip or story arc.

1. Something Old, Something New (December 2010) ISBN 978-0-7407-9139-0
2. In the Beginning, There Was Chaos (October 2011) ISBN 978-1-4494-0954-8
3. Making Ends Meet (March 2013) ISBN 978-1-4494-2301-8
4. It's One Thing After Another! (March 2014) ISBN 978-1-4494-3717-6

==== Sunday collections ====
When the first collections appeared, the Sunday strips were not included in them - only the dailies were included. Instead, the following two 'Sunday' collections (also published by Andrews & McMeel) were published. Each book contains full-color reprints of 79 Sunday strips. While the strips appeared in the Sunday paper each week, and thus are part of the overall storyline, they are not included in the list of the "Chronological" collections and are not mentioned on the official "For Better or For Worse" website. These books are:

1. More than a Month of Sundays: A for Better or for Worse Sunday Collection (1983) ISBN 0-8362-1218-5
2. Our Sunday Best: A for Better or for Worse Sunday Collection (1984) ISBN 0-8362-2057-9

==== Retrospectives ====
These books include a 'retrospect' section, and usually some autobiographical and/or "behind the scenes" information. In particular The Lives Behind the Lines has biographies of all the major and many minor characters, including information not otherwise explored in the strip. The first two books also include the year of most recently printed comic strips.

- A Look Inside ... For Better or For Worse: The 10th Anniversary Collection (Sept 1989) ISBN 0-8362-1853-1
- It's the Thought That Counts... Fifteenth Anniversary Collection (Aug 1994) ISBN 0-8362-1762-4
- Remembering Farley: A Tribute to the Life of Our Favorite Cartoon Dog (1996) ISBN 0-8362-1309-2
- The Lives Behind the Lines: 20 Years of For Better or For Worse (Oct 1999) ISBN 0-7407-0199-1
- All About April: Our Little Girl Grows Up! (2001) ISBN 0-7407-2063-5
- Suddenly Silver: 25 Years of For Better or For Worse (Nov 2004) ISBN 0-7407-4739-8

==== Little books ====
These "little books" combine character illustrations from the strip with inspirational text or verse.

- Isn't He Beautiful? (text by Andie Parton) (2000)
- Isn't She Beautiful? (text by Andie Parton) (2000)
- Wags and Kisses (text by Andie Parton) (2001)
- A Perfect Christmas (text by Andie Parton) (2001)
- Graduation: Just the Beginning! (text by Andie Parton) (2003)

==== Gift books ====
Gift books are similar to little books, but are in a larger format.

- So You're Going to Be a Grandma! (text by Andie Parton) (2005) ISBN 0-7407-5049-6
- I Love My Grandpa! (text by Andie Parton) (2006) ISBN 0-7407-5679-6

==== Tor Books ====
In the early 1990s, Tor Books published a series of standard-paperback strip collections.

1. It All Comes Out In The Wash (March 1990) ISBN 0-8125-0692-8
2. Grandpas Are For Jumping On (Aug 1990) ISBN 0-8125-0986-2
3. Happiness Is A Warm Puddle (Aug 1991) ISBN 0-8125-1346-0
4. Another Day, Another Lecture (Dec 1991) ISBN 0-8125-1736-9
5. You Can Play in the Barn, but You Can't Get Dirty (Feb 1992) ISBN 0-8125-1737-7
6. But I Read The Destructions! (Feb 1993) ISBN 0-8125-1738-5
7. Shhh -- Mom's Working!! (April 1993) ISBN 0-8125-1739-3
8. It's A Pig Eat Chicken World (Sept 1993) ISBN 0-8125-1740-7
9. Misery Loves Company (Feb 1994) ISBN 0-8125-1741-5
10. Am I Too Big To Hug? (April 1994) ISBN 0-8125-3640-1

For Better or For Worse: The Complete Library

Publication information
- Publisher: The Library of American Comics
- Schedule: annual
- Format: Hardcover
- Genre: Drama; Comedy; Slice of life Gag-a-day
- No. of issues: 9 published of 9 planned
- Main character(s): Elly Patterson; John Patterson; Michael Patterson; Elizabeth Patterson; April Patterson; Farley the Dog

Creative team
- Written by: Lynn Johnston
- Artist: Lynn Johnston
- Editor(s): Dean Mullaney; Kurtis Findlay

==== For Better or For Worse: The Complete Library ====
A book series which collects the complete run of For Better or For Worse, published by Library of American Comics.

===== Background =====
The series was first announced in March 2017 with a planned release date in October the same year.

It was presented that the series would comprise nine volumes in total, three each per decade of the strip's original run. The books was to be made with the input from the creator, Lynn Johnston, while being edited by Dean Mullaney, Kurtis Findlay and Lorraine Turner at LoAC. This For Better or For Worse complete series became the first non-American comic strip title to get its own collection in The Library of American Comics' line of publications. In November 2017 the first volume was finally released.

===== Format =====
The volumes of this series measure 11 inches × 8.5 inches, (280 mm × 216 mm), oriented in landscape view and are hardcover. The daily strips are reproduced in black-and-white and the Sunday pages in full color, both arranged in consecutive chronological order.

Compared to most other books series from LoAC the volumes of this one lacks sewn ribbon bookmarks and dust jackets but this is compensated by the high page count at around 540 pages per tome. The MSRP of each volume is set at $39.99 to $49.99.

Due to a misprint, volume five of the series paper stock came to be a semi-glossed type. The sixth and following volumes will go back to have the matte paper stock originally used for all other books of the series.

Kurtis Findlay assembled all the cartoons with help from Katie Hadway (daughter of Johnston as well as executive director of Lynn Johnston Productions) and Stephanie Vandoleweerd, web designer and archivist. Findlay also wrote introductions and had the role as an overseer of the project. Since this edition is a "Complete Library", a lot of material that had been neglected or discarded from previous trade paperback collections have in this series been included. Notes to the plots have been added to the margins by the creator, taking up reader reactions, own insights, even occasional regrets. The paper stock is of thick good quality.

Color restoration

Every Sunday strip has been recolored in order to make the collection more cohesive in between the different decades of it and also making it more appealing to contemporary readers. When the comic industry started its migration over to digital coloring in the early 1990s the whole coloring process changed. The effort to recolor these later years of the strip therefore are a different story. One challenge was the for 2020s standard low resolution original print files, the for its era high resolution digital files used during those years of the strip.

Amendments

The comic strips' original run ended in 2008, however, Johnston continued to update some of the older strips and also created a number of new strips in order to expand upon some storylines and character development, as well as fixing older continuity faults. After 2010 she felt she had accomplished this and stopped adding new additions to the strip once for all. However she still to this day (2018) fixes minor flaws, like updating cultural references for the strips that are in reruns, e.g. changing a SNES controller to a contemporary equivalent, and adjusting the retail price of coffee. All the significant changes will be included in the volumes of this series.

===== Volumes =====
Volumes
Volume	Release date	Title	Period	Page count	ISBN
1	2017-11-14	“For Better or For Worse: The Complete Library - Vol. 1”	September 9, 1979 – January 1, 1983	544	978-1-63140-982-0
2	2018-07-31	“For Better or For Worse: The Complete Library - Vol. 2”	January 2, 1983 – July 5, 1986	544	978-1-68405-256-1
3	2019-07-16	“For Better or For Worse: The Complete Library - Vol. 3”	July 6, 1986 – December 9, 1989	544	978-1-68405-426-8
4	2020-03-24	"For Better or For Worse: The Complete Library - Vol. 4"	December 10, 1989 – April 24, 1993	544	978-1-68405-585-2
5	2021-01-12	"For Better or For Worse: The Complete Library - Vol. 5"	April 25, 1993 – August 31, 1996	544	978-1-68405-750-4
6	2022-03-23	"For Better or For Worse: The Complete Library - Vol. 6"	September 1, 1996 – January 1, 2000	536	978-1-68405-896-9
7	2023-10-03	"For Better or For Worse: The Complete Library - Vol. 7"	January 2, 2000 – May 3, 2003	544	978-1-68405-896-9
8	2024-03-26	"For Better or For Worse: The Complete Library - Vol. 8"	May 4, 2003 – July 29, 2006	512	979-8-88724-069-5
9	2024-11-05	"For Better or For Worse: The Complete Library - Vol. 9"	July 30, 2006 – August 30, 2008	496	979-8-88724-147-0

=== Other FBoFW books ===
- Leaving Home: Survival of the Hippest (text by Andie Parton) (2003): An instructional book about single living for young readers who have recently permanently moved out of their parents' home.
- Laugh 'n' Learn Spanish : Featuring the #1 Comic Strip "For Better or For Worse" (with Brenda Wegmann) (2003) ISBN 0-07-141519-X
