= Kaúxuma Núpika =

Ktunaxa dreamer

Ktunaxa leader

Personal details
- Died: Early 19th century

Kaúxuma Núpika ("Gone to the Spirits"), (Note: Older references give spellings like Ko-come-ne Pe-ca and say it meant "Manlike Woman" in Kutenai. Some references give "Bowdash" as another name. Bowdash is apparently a form of the berdache (perhaps specifically of Chinook Jargon "burdash").) also known as Qánqon Kámek Klaúla ("Sitting in the Water Grizzly") or Manlike Woman, was a Kutenai (Note: Most early and later sources identify Kaúxuma as Kutenai, though a few have suggested that the prophet could alternatively have been Ojibwa.) person who lived in the early 19th century.

== First marriage and gender change ==
Kaúxuma is mentioned in David Thompson's Columbia River journals, around 1811, as a prophet who had changed gender and was then a "man-like woman" with a wife. Kaúxuma was initially married to a Canadian man, to whom Ria Brodell says "she was essentially a slave wife". Thompson describes Kaúxuma as initially a sort of second wife to one of his men named Boisverd in 1803, and reports that Kaúxuma "became so common that I had to send her to her relations; as all the Indian men are married, a courtesan is neglected by the men and hated by the women." Upon leaving this husband and returning to the Kutenai, Kaúxuma said that the man had changed Kaúxuma's sex or gender, thereafter adopting men's clothing and weapons and taking a wife.

== Travels as a prophet ==
Kaúxuma traveled throughout the Pacific Northwest, serving as a courier and guide to fur trappers and traders, and as a prophetic figure, predicting the arrival of deadly diseases among the peoples of the area. Thompson encountered Kaúxuma next on Rainy Lake, near the Upper Columbia River, in July 1809, where he says "she had set herself up for a prophetess and gradually had gained, by her shrewdness, some influence among the natives as a dreamer, and expounder of dreams. She recollected me before I did her, and gave a haughty look of defiance, as much to say, I am now out of your power." It was 1811 before Thompson ran into Kaúxuma again, when Kaúxuma walked into his camp seeking asylum; Thompson describes Kaúxuma as "apparently a young man, well dressed in leather, carrying a Bow and Quiver of Arrows, with his Wife, a young woman in good clothing". Thompson says Manlike Woman was in trouble with his adopted tribe, the Chinooks, for predicting diseases. Thompson says nothing of his response to the asylum request, but notes that his men found it a tale worth repeating. On August 2, his journal states that "the story of the Woman that carried a Bow and Arrows and had a Wife, was to them a romance to which they paid great attention". John Robert Colombo, author of Mysterious Canada: Strange Sights, Extraordinary Events, and Peculiar Places, extracted the quotes about Manlike Woman from David Thompson's Narrative of His Explorations in Western America: 1784-1812 (1916), edited by J.B. Tyrrell.

In 1823, John Franklin (of the Franklin Expedition to look for a Northwest Passage) wrote that eight years earlier (in 1815) a "manlike woman" had been present at Fort Chipewyan, near Lake Athabasca, whose followers believed him to possess "supernatural abilities," and who predicted great change would come to Native peoples in the area. "A Kutenai woman wearing men's clothing" (and fluent in French) is also recorded in 1825 at the Flathead trading post, serving as an interpreter to the fort's factor, who was Franklin's source, a Mr. Stewart of the Hudson's Bay Company.

Thompson never gives the "Woman that carried a Bow and Arrows and had a Wife" a name; it was John Franklin who refers to "the Manlike Woman" in his Narrative of a Second Expedition to the Shores of the Polar Sea (1928), and suggests the designation was one given to him by the native people he influenced. Stewart said Manlike Woman was believed to be supernatural because he excelled in male roles despite his "delicate frame," and Lee Irwin writes that "gender switching was often interpreted as indicating [...] shamanic ability". Franklin's contribution ends with a fuzzy reference to a journey by Manlike Woman to carry a packet between two Hudson's Bay Company posts, "through a tract of country which had not, at that time, been passed by the traders, and which was known to be infested by several hostile tribes"; he undertook this journey with his wife, and was attacked and wounded in the process, but achieved his objective.

Kaúxuma acquired the name Qánqon Kámek Klaúla, "Sitting in the Water Grizzly", after crouching while crossing a stream (returning from an unsuccessful raid) so others would not "discern his sex". Kaúxuma was killed while attempting to negotiate peace between two tribes. In older accounts, Kaúxuma's death "is described as magical, his wounds healing each time he was struck until finally his enemy had to cut out his heart."

== Legacy and interpretations ==
Kaúxuma "is remembered among the Kutenai as a respected shamanic healer"; in 1935, some Kutenai recollected relatives whom Kaúxuma had healed. Francis Saxa recorded Kaúxuma as a prophet and "peace messenger" who helped his father Ignace La Moose, an Iroquois missionary, proselytize Catholicism to the Flatheads.

Will Roscoe argues that Kaúxuma is best understood "in contemporary terms as a trans man."

== See also ==
- List of transgender-related topics
- Two-Spirit
