= Mary Young =

Mary, Marie or Maria Young may refer to:

== Musicians ==
- Mary Jane Young (born 1937), Canadian folksinger, member of Mary Jane and Winston Young
- Polly Young (1749–1799), also known as Mary Young and Maria Young, English classical soprano

== Others ==
- Jenny Diver (c. 1700–1741), née Mary Young, notorious British pickpocket
- Maria Young Dougall (1849–1935), née Young, American suffragist
- Marie Grice Young (1876–1959), survivor of the Titanic sinking
- Mary Ann Angell (1808–1882, full name Mary Ann Angell Young), American religious figure
- Mary Bird (skier) (1910–2002, full name Mary Elizabeth Bird Young), American alpine skier
- Mary de Young (born 1950), American sociologist
- Mary E. Young (1929–2021), American historian
- Mary Helen Young (1883–1945), Scottish nurse and resistance fighter
- Mary Jo Young, American contestant on American Idol season 19
- Mary Julia Young (fl. 1775–1810), novelist, poet, translator, and biographer
- Mary Rose Young (born 1958), English ceramic artist
- Mary Sophie Young (c. 1872–1919), botanist at the University of Texas
- Mary Young (actress) (1879–1971), stage and film actress
- Mary Young (politician), member of the Colorado House of Representatives
- Mary Young Cheney Greeley (1811–1872), American schoolteacher, suffragist, and spiritualist
- Mary Young Pickersgill (1776–1857), née Young, American flagmaker
- Mary Young Sewell (c. 1759–1821), née Young, British poet
- Sean Young (Mary Sean Young, born 1959), American actress
- Mary Young Ridenbaugh (c. 1834–c. 1941), American biographer and novelist, also known as Mary Thompson Young

== Fictional characters ==
- Mary Alice Young, in the American TV series Desperate Housewives, played by Brenda Strong

== See also ==
- Mary S. Young State Recreation Area, park in Oregon, USA
