= Mosquito Lake (TV series) =

- Genre: Sitcom
- Created by: Paul K. Willis
- Starring: Mike MacDonald; Mary Long; Dan Redican; Maria Vacratsis
- Country of origin: Canada
- No. of seasons: 1
- No. of episodes: 25

Production
- Running time: 30 minutes

Original release
- Network: CBC Television
- Release: 1989 – 1990

Mosquito Lake is a Canadian television sitcom that aired on CBC Television in the 1989–90 television season. The show, a family sitcom, starred comedian Mike MacDonald as Bob Harrison, the father of a family spending the summer in a dilapidated cottage on Mosquito Lake.

The cast also included Mary Long as Bob's wife Rita; Tara Charendoff and Bradley Machry as their kids Tara and Brian; Dan Redican as George, Bob's friend from the neighbouring cottage; and Maria Vacratsis as Ramona, the owner of the lake's marina. The show was created by Paul K. Willis.

== Critical response ==
Tony Atherton of the Ottawa Citizen wrote that "For the record, the show does have funny moments, some clever lines, and a cast that could be quite likeable. But the pluses are swept away like a floating dock in a bad storm under the barrage of moronic plots, clichéd characters and cheap sets." He compared the show to "Fred and Barney meet the kids from Growing Pains".

Greg Quill of the Toronto Star also felt that the show had squandered its potential, opining that "the premise is fine – on paper. Cottage life, blustering American tourists, the call of the wild, the summer getaway are things Canadians understand all too well. And, in MacDonald and Redican, the series has a couple of potentially bright stars...so why constrain the talent here to scripts and situations so obviously derived from the American model, and adapted so poorly? For all its blather about being a Canadian show, Mosquito Lake could be set in Michigan or old Detroit or Southern California. If CBC is going to make the expensive leap into situation comedies, why can't it follow through with something original, or at least something funny?"

Even MacDonald seemed less than enthused by the show, telling the press that "If they came up to me and said, 'Here's $300,000 an episode, go make what you want,' I would not make this. I'd make something that would be considered a little hipper, I think. This is a very normal show. It's on Fridays at 7 p.m. That's the kind of show it is. Everybody can watch it and not get freaked out. I would prefer to be a little more real towards the Roseanne side. It's not, but it's OK. It's a little bit in the middle." Willis, the series creator, was also later quoted as saying that he regretted not having fought for greater creative control of the production, as he was never satisfied with the finished product either.

Despite its critical unpopularity, the show was more successful in Canadian television ratings than its contemporary In Opposition, attracting roughly the same audience each week as successful series such as The Beachcombers and The Kids in the Hall.

It received a Gemini Award nomination for Best Comedy Series at the 5th Gemini Awards in 1990, although the fact that it was seen as nomination-worthy was derided by critics as proof of the overall weakness of Canadian television comedy in its era; in particular, the Geminis were criticized for imposing a new rule restricting the category to narrative sitcoms rather than sketch comedy shows, which relegated The Kids in the Hall and CODCO, the latter of which had won the Best Comedy Series award the previous year, to the Best Variety Series category.

== Cancellation ==
The show produced 25 episodes, but was cancelled after 19 episodes had aired. Its cancellation was attributed to budget cuts rather than critical response. Reruns of the series, including the remaining six unaired episodes, aired on CBC in the early summer of 1991.
