= Helen Burns =

British actress (1916–2018)

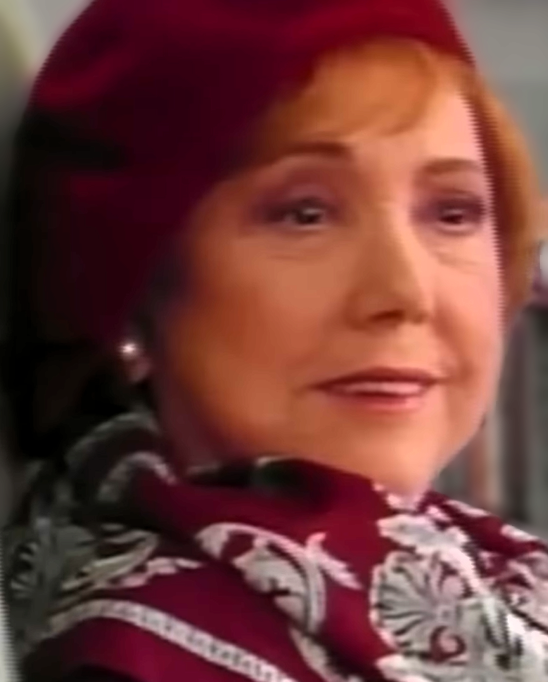
Burns in "Do-It-Yourself Mr. Bean" (1994)

Helen Burns (22 December 1916 – 23 July 2018) was a British actress mostly known for playing comedic roles. Burns is known for her performance in the 1993 production of The Last Yankee at the Duke of York's Theatre, for which she won a Laurence Olivier Award.

== Early life and career ==
Burns was born in London on 22 December 1916. She appeared in several films including: The Changeling (1980), Zorro, The Gay Blade (1981), If You Could See What I Hear (1982), and Utilities (1983). She also appeared in the television movies Scarlett and Life After Life and made guest appearances on several television series including Dr. Finlay's Casebook, Pulaski, The Big One, and Mr. Bean.

Burns's Broadway stage credits include The Inspector General, There's One in Every Marriage (1957), The First Gentleman, at the Belasco Theatre in New York City, and Catsplay, for the latter of which she received a Drama Desk Award nomination for Outstanding Actress in a Play. She also starred in the 1978 Canadian film adaptation Catsplay, for which she won the Earle Grey Award for best television actor at the 8th ACTRA Awards in 1979.

She received a Genie Award nomination for Best Supporting Actress for The Changeling at the 1st Genie Awards in 1980.

== Personal life and death ==
On 8 July 1948, Burns was married to theatre director Michael Langham, the former head of both the Stratford Festival and the Juilliard School, and was the mother of actor/writer Chris Langham.

Burns died on 23 July 2018, aged 101.
