= Gay Claitman =

Canadian sketch comedian and writer

- Occupation(s): Sketch comedian and writer
- Known for: Work with The Jest Society; ACTRA Awards for Lies My Mother Told Me; CBC Radio comedy series
- Awards: ACTRA Award for Radio Variety Performance (1979); ACTRA Award for Radio Variety Writing (1979)

Gay Claitman is a Canadian sketch comedian and writer, who won two ACTRA Awards for Radio Variety Performance and Radio Variety Writing at the 8th ACTRA Awards in 1979 for her work with Nancy White and Robert Cameron on the radio play Lies My Mother Told Me.

She first became known for her work alongside John Morgan, Martin Bronstein, Patrick Conlon and Roger Abbott as a member of The Jest Society, leaving the troupe before it evolved into Royal Canadian Air Farce.

In 1975, she performed at the Merry Posa Revue, a comedy revue staged in honour of influential Canadian humorist Stephen Leacock. In 1976, she was a creator of the CBC Radio comedy series Pulp and Paper with Paul K. Willis and Michael Boncoeur. In 1979, Claitman and White created the CBC Radio comedy series Gee, That's a Cute Dress Marjene, and in 1980 they created the stage comedy revue Little Pink Lies.

She was a cast member of Willis and Boncoeur's radio comedy specials If You Love This Government in 1984 and The Year of Living Obnoxiously in 1985, with the cast of If You Love This Government receiving an ACTRA nomination for Best Radio Variety Performance at the 15th ACTRA Awards in 1986.

She also had small supporting acting roles in the films Head Office (1985) and Mama's Going to Buy You a Mockingbird (1988).
