= Angela Fusco =

Canadian actress

- Born: 1944 (age 80–81); Toronto, Ontario, Canada
- Education: University of Toronto (BA)
- Occupation: Actress

Angela Fusco (born 1944 in Toronto) is a Canadian actress.

== Early life and education ==
She earned a bachelor's degree in English from the University of Toronto.

== Career ==
The daughter of violinist Frank (Francesco) Fusco, she began her career as a child doing programs for children and adults on CBC Radio and television. In her teens, she spent three seasons at the Stratford Festival gaining experience under directors such as Michael Langham and Jean Gascon, and working with Douglas Rain, John Colicos and Kate Reid. After graduating from university, Angela performed in theatres, including the National Arts Centre, the Royal Alexandra Theatre, Theatre Calgary, Alberta Theatre Projects, the Citadel Theatre, Sudbury Theatre Centre and Young People’s Theatre. She played Alicia in Lady Audley’s Secret at the Shaw Festival.

Her mezzo soprano voice has brought her roles in musical theatre, including the Dora Award-winning Colette, The Colours of Love, which was written especially for her. Angela also garnered acclaim playing Mother Superior in Nunsense, and ran for nine months in the hit 1940s revue, Blue Champagne. As well as a season at the Blyth Festival in 1995, some of her Toronto theatre appearances include the Actors Repertory Company’s 2003 Dora Award-winning production of Edward Bond’s The Sea and a remount of the 2002 Fringe Festival hit The Terrible False Deception.

For four years Angela hosted the CBC classical music program Listen to the Music. She also hosted Music for an Afternoon on CJRT, and has appeared as guest host on the CBC radio programs Sunday Morning, Stereo Morning, Saturday Afternoon at the Opera, and Arts National. Fusco has done television and radio commercials and narrations, including TVO's Read All About It!. She was the voice of Mrs. Claus in the 2018 animated feature Elliot the Littlest Reindeer.

Fusco combined her theatrical and musical abilities to perform narration with music for several projects with Peggy Hills’s Chamber Music Society of Mississauga. These have included A Butterfly in Time, The Little Mermaid and The Snow Queen all of which were recorded. A Butterfly in Time was nominated for a Juno Award in 2005.

Her later career film and television credits include Alliance Atlantis’s The Morrison Murders and an episode of The Listener. Angela has also played principal roles in The Third Miracle with Ed Harris, Focus with William H. Macy, and in New Blood with John Hurt.

== Filmography ==
=== Film ===
Year	Title	Role	Notes
1979	All the Fun of the Fair	Sister Estelle	
1983	Utilities	Italian Momma	
1986	Confidential	Nurse	
1989	Babar: The Movie	Celeste's Mom	
1993	The Art of the Animator Part I	Narrator	
1999	The Third Miracle	Charity Woman	
2001	Focus	Second Woman on Subway	
2018	Elliot the Littlest Reindeer	Mrs. Claus	

=== Television ===
Year	Title	Role	Notes
1955–1957	General Motors Theatre	Pamela Mason	3 episodes
1957	Hawkeye and the Last of the Mohicans	Peggy	Episode: "Winter Passage"
1978	Catsplay		TV movie
1978	King of Kensington	Rosa	Episode: "The Dukedom"
1979–1982	Read All About It!	Various roles	29 episodes
1980	The Littlest Hobo	Secretary	Episode: "Give My Regards to Broadway"
1982	Hangin' In	Mrs. Glade	Episode: "The Beefcake Boy"
1984	The Guardian	Woman	Television film
1985	The Undergrads	Carol	Television film
1992	E.N.G.	Meagan MacDonald	Episode: "Waves"
1993	X-Rated	River's Mom	Television film
1994	Side Effects	Dr. Barbara Collins	Episode: "The Great Chendini"
1994	Liberty Street	Art instructor	Episode: "Naked Truth"
1995	TekWar	Montgomery / Warden	2 episodes
1995	Cagney & Lacey: The View Through the Glass Ceiling	Gerri Croft	Television film
1996	The Morrison Murders: Based on a True Story	Flo	Television film
2001	Twice in a Lifetime	Mrs. Agnelli	Episode: "Mama Mia"
2002	Doc	Administrator	Episode: "Citizen Crane"
2008	Testees	Nugget's Mom	Episode: "Pill for Men"
2009	The Listener	Alev Bey	Episode: "Missing"
