= Catsplay (1978 film) =

- Genre: Drama
- Based on: Catsplay (Macskajáték) by István Örkény
- Written by: Timothy Findley
- Directed by: Stephen Katz
- Starring: Helen Burns; Doris Petrie; Jan Rubeš
- Country of origin: Canada
- Original language: English

Production
- Producer: Beverley Roberts
- Running time: 90 minutes
- Production company: Canadian Broadcasting Corporation

Original release
- Network: CBC Television
- Release: March 1978

Catsplay is a Canadian drama television film, which was broadcast by CBC Television in 1978. An adaptation of the novel Catsplay (Macskajáték) by István Örkény, the film was directed by Stephen Katz and written by Timothy Findley.

The film stars Helen Burns as Bela Orban, a woman living in Budapest, Hungary, who is having a love affair with an opera singer (Jan Rubeš); meanwhile, her sister Giza (Doris Petrie) is living a wealthier but sterile life on the other side of the Iron Curtain in Germany.

The cast also includes Frances Hyland, Moya Fenwick, Angela Fusco and Les Carlson.

Burns also starred in stage productions of Catsplay, directed by Lynne Meadow and translated by Clara Gyorgyey, for which she received a Drama Desk Award nomination for Best Actress in a Play in 1978.

The film was broadcast by the CBC in March 1978 as an episode of its anthology series Front Row Centre.

Burns won the Earle Grey Award for best television actor, and Fenwick was nominated for best supporting television actor, at the 8th ACTRA Awards in 1979.
