= Party Game (game show) =

Canadian game show (1970–1981)

- Genre: Game show
- Directed by: Henry Pasila
- Presented by: Al Boliska (1970-1971); Bill Walker (1971-1981)
- Starring: Jack Duffy; Dinah Christie; Billy Van
- Narrated by: Riff Markowitz (as "Gardiner Westbound")
- Theme music composer: Burt Bacharach ("Bond Street")
- Country of origin: Canada
- Original language: English

Production
- Producer: Riff Markowitz
- Production locations: Hamilton, Ontario, Canada
- Running time: 30 minutes each

Original release
- Network: Syndicated through CHCH-TV
- Release: 1970 – 1981

Party Game is a Canadian television game show in the 1970s, produced by Hamilton independent station CHCH-TV from 1970 to 1981. It aired throughout Canada in syndication, broadcast on 32 stations at its peak.

The show featured two teams of three players in a charades competition. In early seasons, the Challenger Team was usually composed of a non-celebrity contestant joined with two guest star players, while the Home Team consisted of series regulars Jack Duffy, Dinah Christie and Billy Van. The show ran daily; competition between the home team and the challengers continued through the whole week, with the final point total for the week being used to determine the winner. In later seasons, the entire challenger panel consisted of celebrities (mostly from Canadian TV and theatre).

Using game play similar to the American game show Pantomime Quiz, answers were usually jokes or complex phrases involving a pun or some other form of word play (example: "Tiny Tee Hee.... "I didn't raise my daughter to be fiddled with," said the pussycat as she rescued her offspring from the violin factory"). Viewers at home were also invited to send their own joke or phrase, which if used, could win them a small prize. The winner of a given round was the team that could get their phrase to be said in the shorter amount of time. The challengers usually got to go first, followed by the home team. Particularly with all-celebrity panels, game play tended to be informal and seldom strictly adhered to hard and fast rules, though the timing of rounds and overall points totals were always kept track of.

Especially in later seasons, the 'home team' had developed such a rapport in playing charades over the years, that the sentences they were forced to act out were often noticeably longer and more complex than the sentences given to the challengers.

The show premiered on CHCH in 1970. In its first season the show was hosted by Al Boliska, who was succeeded in 1971 by Bill Walker. Walker hosted for the remainder of the show's run; the series ended production in 1980, but one further season featuring a compilation of prior episodes aired until 1981.

In addition to the game play, most episodes opened with a brief blackout-style sketch or comedic piece performed by the members of the home team (sometimes with Walker, or one of the guests.)

Party Game was produced by Riff Markowitz, the executive producer and star of The Randy Dandy Show and executive producer of The Hilarious House of Frightenstein. Writers for the series included Paul K. Willis and Michael Boncoeur.

The set was a simple living room type with couches and a few wall pictures and pieces.

The voice-over announcer who announced each charade was credited as "Gardiner Westbound", a nod to a stretch of the Gardiner Expressway in Downtown Toronto heading toward Hamilton, but was actually producer Markowitz.
