= Read All About It! (TV series) =

Canadian television educational series

- Written by: Clive Endersby
- Directed by: Jeremy Pollock
- Country of origin: Canada
- Original language: English
- No. of seasons: 2
- No. of episodes: 40

Production
- Producer: Jeremy Pollock
- Running time: 15 minutes

Original release
- Network: TVOntario
- Release: September 11, 1979 – December 23, 1980

Read All About It! is a Canadian educational television series that was produced from 1979 to 1980 by TVOntario. It starred David Craig Collard as Chris, Lydia Zajc as Lynne, Stacey Arnold as Samantha, and Sean Hewitt as Duneedon, ruler of the galaxy Trialviron. In the second season Michael Dwyer joined the cast as Alex. The main goal of the show was to educate viewers in reading, writing and history. Each episode ran for approximately 15 minutes. Eric Robertson composed the music for the show being filmed in Brampton, Ontario.

== Premise ==
The show is set in the fictitious town of Herbertville, where 11-year-old Chris Anderson inherits his Uncle Derek's coach house seven years after Derek's mysterious disappearance; Derek is now legally presumed dead. The coach house contains two artificially intelligent robots built by Derek: Otto, a device which communicates by printing its thoughts on paper; and Theta, a talking computer with an integrated monitor. The terms of Derek's will stipulate that Chris can only use the coach house before he's 21 if it's for a worthwhile purpose, so he and his friends Lynne and Samantha start a newspaper called The Herbertville Chronicle.

=== First season ===
In episode two, the kids discover the coach house also houses a transporter which allows teleportation to and from the galaxy of Trialviron. After inadvertently triggering the transporter, Lynne and Samantha are trapped within Trialviron by Duneedon, the despotic ruler of the galaxy, but manage to escape. This launches a season-long serial, in which the newspaper is focused on unraveling a conspiracy headed by Herbertville mayor Don Eden (the alter ego of Duneedon) who wants to claim King's Park as his own to get a rare mineral he needs to invade Earth.

The transporter is also able to transport literary characters into the coach house, such as the Queen of Hearts from Alice in Wonderland, Merlin the Magician from King Arthur and the Knights of the Roundtable, and Captain Hook from Peter Pan. These characters sometimes help, and sometimes hinder, the trio's investigation into the conspiracy.

Seen in this serial are Chris, Samantha and Lynne. Recurring players include Duneedon (a.k.a. Mayor Don Eden); Duncan O'Regan (self-described 'security guard extraordinaire' who also seems to be part of the conspiracy); Dr. Crystal Couplet (a friendly Trialveron resident and poet who speaks in rhyme); Joseph Walker (an 80-year-old Herbertville resident who has valuable memories of the town's past); and Ann Blake (a Herbertville town councilor). Chris' Uncle Derek is also eventually found alive, being held captive by Duneedon, and is seen in several episodes.

=== Second season ===
The second season also consists of 20 episodes, but is divided into separate smaller arcs.

- The War of 1812 (Episodes 1 - 5): Samantha and Chris witness a young boy, who is handling a compass, suddenly vanish. Using the same compass, they are transported back to the War of 1812. There they discover the boy, Alex Tanner, has been falsely accused of being a deserter—and he will be executed unless they can rescue him.

Seen in this serial are Chris, Samantha, Lynne (who stays in touch with the time travelers back at the coach house), and Alex (who is introduced in this serial). Recurring players include a brief appearance by Uncle Derek; also seen are Sir Isaac Brock, Laura Secord, and in one episode, Graham Greene as John Nelson.

- The Book Destroyer (Episodes 6 - 9): Lynne and Alex venture into Book World, after discovering that a shadowy figure called The Book Destroyer is systematically erasing beloved characters from literature.

Seen in this serial are Lynne and Alex. Samantha appears only at the very end, setting up the next serial. Chris does not appear; it is mentioned he is recovering from a sprained ankle. Recurring players include The Book Destroyer.

- Samantha Moves Away (Episodes 10 - 13): The gang tries to adjust when a devastated Samantha announces that her family is moving to Victoria, B.C. This is the only serial to contain no science fiction or fantasy elements (aside from the continuing presence of Otto and Theta).

Seen in this serial are Chris, Samantha, Lynne and Alex. Recurring players include Rita Zakowski, a local author whom Sam befriends.

- The Ghost (Episodes 14 - 15): During summer vacation, the ghost of the first principal of the Herbertville School takes up residence in the coach house.

Seen in this serial are Chris and Lynne. Alex is noted as being at camp. Recurring players include Ernest W. Wetherby, a fussy, strict ghost who insists on neatness and correct grammar.

- Duneedon's Return (Episodes 16 - 20): Dr. Crystal Couplet requires the kids' help (and the transporter) to evacuate Trialveron, which is about to go nova. But Duneedon has his own agenda, which may involve returning to conquer Earth, while trapping the kids in a galaxy-wide explosion.

Seen in this serial are Chris, Lynne and Alex. Samantha makes a surprise re-appearance at the very end. Recurring players include Duneedon and Dr. Crystal Couplet.

== Cast ==
- David Craig Collard as Chris Anderson
- Lydia Zajc as Lynne Davis
- Stacey Arnold as Samantha Nikos
- Michael Dwyer as Alex Tanner (season 2)
- Angela Fusco as the voice of Theta

Recurring:

- Sean Hewitt as Duneedon / Mayor Don Eden
- Kay Hawtrey as Dr. Crystal Couplet
- James Irving as Uncle Derek Norris
- Barbara Wheeldon as Ann Blake (season 1)
- Arch McDonnell as Duncan O'Reagan (season 1)
- Susan Mitchell as Rita Zakowski (season 2)
- Edwina Follows as The Book Destroyer (season 2)

== Episodes ==
Read All About It! episodes are presented as "chapters" as in a book.

=== Season 1 ===
- Chapter 01: The Coach House – Chris, Lynne, and Sam visit an old coach house that was passed on to Chris by his uncle who is presumed dead. They find out about a conspiracy in Herbertville after meeting two robots, Otto and Theta.
- Chapter 02: The Stranger – The three friends say they are using the house to publish a newspaper. Suddenly Samantha and Lynne find themselves wheeling through space by a transporter.
- Chapter 03: The Problem Pit – Samantha and Lynne meet Duneedon and become trapped in the Problem Pit where they must answer a number of word problems.
- Chapter 04: The Accidental Visitor – The Queen of Hearts tumbles out of the transporter by mistake and Chris discovers her identity in the library.
- Chapter 05: The First Edition – An unknown intruder tries to prevent publication of the Chronicle which contains Sam's story about Duneedon.
- Chapter 06: The Stolen Message – Chris and Samantha intercept a message from Duneedon ordering the Chronicle stopped.
- Chapter 07: Strange Discoveries – Lynne discovers that the Mayor of Herbertville is none other than Duneedon himself.
- Chapter 08: 'Tis Magic – Merlin the Magician uses his magic powers to send Chris and Lynne to Trialviron.
- Chapter 09: Rhyme Time – In Trialviron, Chris and Lynne meet the poet, Doctor Crystal Couplet, who helps them reach the Place of Change.
- Chapter 10: The Place Of Change – After Lynne and Chris escape from Trialviron, they help Sam with the second edition of the Chronicle.
- Chapter 11: Voices In The Park – Lynne interviews a company of actors. An oldtimer, Mr. Walker, tells her about a mysterious house five decades ago.
- Chapter 12: An Evil Pirate – The transporter suddenly produces an irate Captain Hook, who creates a few tense moments for the kids.
- Chapter 13: Seek And Speak – Lynne writes a speech to help preserve King's Park. Sam and Chris are trapped in an old factory by Duneedon and his agents.
- Chapter 14: Closer To The Truth – Lynne finds out about the mysterious Manor House fire. Sam and Chris find a document the evil Duneedon forged to grab control of the city park.
- Chapter 15: Time For Action – The three friends put together a new edition of the paper and Lynne gives her speech to save the park.
- Chapter 16: To The Rescue – Chris sends a message that he's trapped on Trialviron. The genie from Aladdin's lamp transports Sam and Lynne to the Shifting Sands.
- Chapter 17: Pictures In Your Mind – Doctor Couplet helps send Sam and Lynne to the Planet of Maze.
- Chapter 18: The Planet Of Maze – Lynne and Sam help Chris and his uncle escape from the Planet of Maze by answering riddling questions.
- Chapter 19: Special Edition – The police round up Duneedon's agents. A special edition of the Chronicle exposes the conspiracy.
- Chapter 20: The Showdown – When Duneedon tries to destroy Otto and Theta and trap Lynne and Sam, he is outfoxed and sent on a one-way trip to Trialviron.

=== Season 2 ===
- Chapter 01: The Anniversary – The Herbertville Chronicle celebrates its first anniversary and the group is introduced to the "two-way" communication device.
- Chapter 02: Back In Time – Chris and Sam find an old chart at the spot where the mysterious boy dematerialized and send a picture of it back to Lynne, who begins researching clues.
- Chapter 03: General Brock – When General Brock finds Sam and Chris in his room, he has a hard time believing they are from the future and are not American spies. Once convinced, he offers to help them. (filmed on location at Fort George)
- Chapter 04: Journey To Queenston – Sam and Chris meet an Indian named John Norton, who leads them towards Queenston and then leaves them in the care of his compatriot, Laura Secord.
- Chapter 05: Death At Dawn – Sam and Chris finally manage to save the young stranger, and the three time-travellers narrowly escape being caught in the War of 1812.
- Chapter 06: A Plea For Help – After learning what their names mean from Otto and Theta, they hear a voice calling for help from the pages of Cinderella. They magically disappear into Book World to attempt a rescue.
- Chapter 07: Where Villains Roam – In their search for the Book Destroyer, Lynne and Alex must deal with both the "Mirror on the Wall" and the wicked queen from Snow White.
- Chapter 08: An Evil Smile – Lynne and Alex encounter Count Dracula and Rip Van Winkle on their quest to find the Book Destroyer.
- Chapter 09: The Book Destroyer – The Book Destroyer traps Lynne and Alex in her mine and says they must help her erase all villains from books.
- Chapter 10: Problems – Chris and Samantha work on an advertisement to rent her house. Samantha is distressed and touchy at having to leave Herbertville.
- Chapter 11: The Final Day – Sam and Rita become fast friends and Sam promises to write from Victoria about her new experiences.
- Chapter 12: A New Beginning – Rita surprises Sam with the news that she is writing a book based on Sam's move to Victoria.
- Chapter 13: Many Different Stories – Chris comes back from the library with a copy of "The Shooting of Dan McGrew". Lynne and Alex help him devise a fantastic story for Rita.
- Chapter 14: The Remarkable Mr. Wetherby – Just when Chris and Lynne think they are having a dull summer, an unusual visitor turns up at the Coach House. It is the ghost of Mr. Wetherby.
- Chapter 15: One Ghost Too Many – Chris and Lynne are having a hard time coping with Mr. Wetherby's strict supervision. They research the former principal's likes and dislikes and embark on a scheme to get rid of him.
- Chapter 16: The Force – Chris, Alex and Lynne are reading a letter from Sam when they receive an urgent message from Trialviron.
- Chapter 17: Choices – After realizing they are the only ones who can save the people of Trialviron, Lynne, Alex, and Chris set two conditions before agreeing to help.
- Chapter 18: The Ambassadors – Alex and Chris arrive on the planet of Trivia and discover a strange tunnel.
- Chapter 19: Trapped! – Alex and Chris work hard to get everyone off Trialviron, then discover that Duneedon has tricked them.
- Chapter 20: Final Moments – It looks as if Chris, Alex, and Lynne will vanish with the rest of Trialviron unless someone shows up to help them. An unexpected visitor arrives at the Coach House, and Otto and Theta print out instructions to save their friends.

== DVD release ==
A DVD release of Read All About It was done by the Visual Education Center of Toronto, Ontario, Canada. This is a correction that conflicts with the statement given by the writer Clive Endersby:

"Unfortunately, as far as I know there are no plans to do anything with them [Read All About It and Polka Dot Door]. Due to special 'educational' arrangements (ie: lower fees) that channels like TVOntario had with the various unions (Writers, actors, directors, musicians) renewals of clearance rights and royalties had to be paid in advance for a set number of years — rather than an after-payment of a percentage of sales as is normal for commercial programs.

"Because of the cutbacks (or lack of growth) in funding for these types of stations, they cannot afford to renew these clearances 'up front' which would decimate their program budgets in any one year. Both TVO and the various union members would dearly love to switch these contracts to a 'percentage of a sales' system but the law is the law and neither side can change an existing contract without agreement from all who signed it."

== See also ==
- Tomes & Talismans, 1986 educational sci-fi series
