= Don Cullen =

Canadian entertainer (1933–2022)

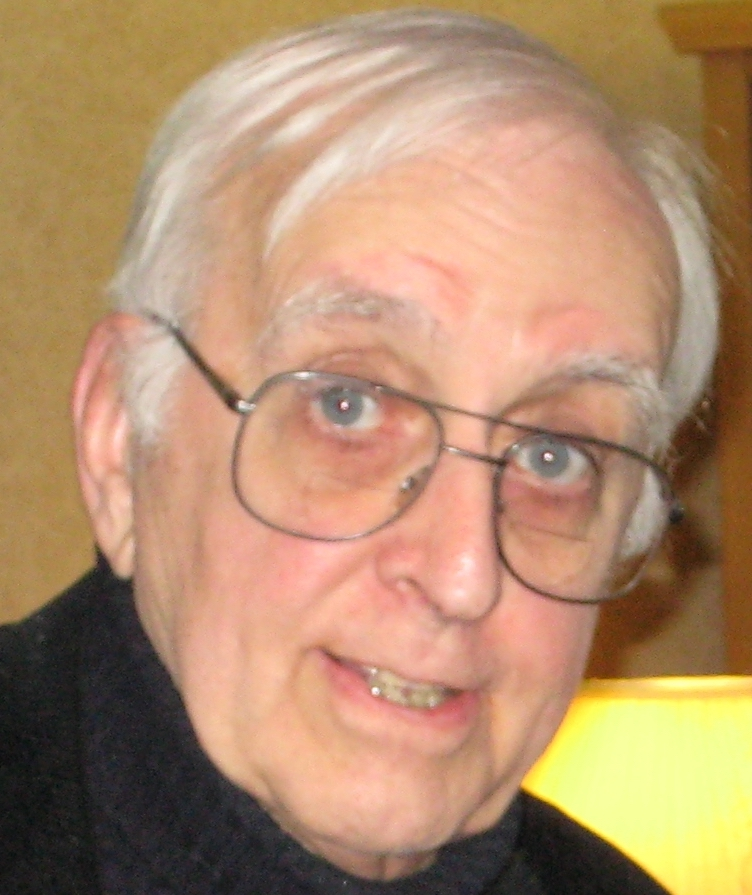
- Cullen in 2008
- Born: January 18, 1933; London, Ontario Canada
- Died: June 26, 2022 (aged 89); Toronto, Ontario, Canada
- Occupations: Actor, Writer, Comedian, Poet, Entrepreneur
- Known for: Founding the Bohemian Embassy coffee house

Donald Austin Cullen (January 18, 1933 – June 26, 2022) was a Canadian actor, comedian, writer, and proprietor of the Bohemian Embassy, which he operated, off and on, in various Toronto locations from 1960 to the early 1990s. He was a prolific performer on radio, stage, and television, including as a featured player on Wayne and Shuster's CBC television broadcasts, for 25 years.

== Early life and education ==
Cullen was born in London, Ontario, moving with his family to the High Park area of Toronto in 1936. His parents, Elsie (née Smythe) and Austin Cullen, were fundamentalist Christians. Young Donald studied the Bible at High Park Baptist Church, but later declared himself an atheist. At Humberside Collegiate, he was known among his peers for his imitations of their teachers. He was drawn to the drama club, where he learned he had a capacity for accents, and "that I did this rather well, actually."

He auditioned for the Young Canada Players, but his father forbade him from participating, "partly because they rehearsed on Sunday." The school yearbook declared Cullen "the Jerry Lewis of Humberside," also noting that he was a "'Rawhide' fanatic," referring to the CBC radio program starring humorist Max Ferguson, and "Hopes radio holds a future."

Cullen studied Radio and Television Arts at Ryerson Polytechnical Institute, now Toronto Metropolitan University, and briefly at Toronto Teachers' College, only to please his parents, he claimed.

== Early career ==
He started his career in radio at the CBC, as a copy clerk in the television news department, and he worked there for almost four years. He and some CBC colleagues agreed that Toronto needed more creative culture, and a place to gather other than the Celebrity Club, across Jarvis Street from the Corporation. Five people, including Cullen, each put up $100 to start the Bohemian Embassy, a coffeehouse first located what had been the hayloft of a stable at 7 St. Nicholas Street, near Yonge Street. The club presented a diverse range of attractions, juxtaposing folk music with poetry, film screenings, theatrical presentations, magic, and other acts. Performers included musicians Gordon Lightfoot, Sylvia Fricker (later Tyson) and Joni Mitchell, and poets Margaret Atwood, Gwendolyn MacEwen, Milton Acorn, and Al Purdy.

The Embassy was also where, in February 1961, the first edition of the Village Revue opened, a satirical show devised by Barrie Baldaro, Ralph Hicklin, and others. Cullen was implored to join the cast, he recalled, because he could do a Russian accent.

At CBC radio, he hosted a Saturday broadcast, called The Show That Dares To Be Known By Bad Taste Alone. Originally a program that featured hit records, it evolved into including more offbeat recordings and sketches, modelling Rawhide and similar in format to The Max Ferguson Show.

== Performances and later career ==
Starting in October 1964, for six months, Cullen performed as one of the four cast members in a touring adaptation of the British satirical show Beyond the Fringe, known as Beyond the Fringe '65. He had auditioned at an open call in Toronto, and was offered the job some two years later, he claimed because the producers had not been able to find him. The production played more than 200 performances, in more than 70 locations in Canada and the United States, including a four-week run on Broadway, at the Ethel Barrymore Theatre.

A later edition of the Village Revue, under the title, Two's Company, featuring only Baldaro and Cullen, played Cafe Le Hibou, the Ottawa coffeehouse, in September 1965.

In October 1965, the 90-minute show returned to the Bohemian Embassy, then transferred to the Colonnade Theatre. Toronto Daily Star theatre critic Nathan Cohen described Cullen as "having the look of a famished vampire and a voice trembling on the brink of uninhibited hysteria."

It had been directed by recent University of Toronto student Lorne Lipowitz, later Lorne Michaels, whose then-girlfriend Rosalind Shuster's father, Frank, saw the show, and from that meeting began Cullen's regular appearances on Wayne and Shuster's television shows. He joined a repertory company, specializing in eccentric characters and dialects. Emulating Alec Guinness's ability to change his appearance according to the character he played, using makeup, costume, hair, and props, Cullen said he enjoyed when people said, "You were on Wayne and Shuster? I never saw you on Wayne and Shuster."

Cullen continued to be associated with Beyond the Fringe. In 1967, he directed it at the Studio Arena Theater in Buffalo, New York, with a cast of Toronto performers: Barrie Baldaro, Roy Wordsworth, Stuart Hamilton, and Nick Simons in the role that Cullen declined to play while staging the show. The production moved to Toronto, and Simons stepped aside so Cullen could take the stage again, in the cabaret room of a restaurant, Upstairs at Old Angelo's, opening on August 17, 1967. According to Cullen, the props and costumes from the Buffalo production had been given to him for the Toronto version, which recouped the costs of mounting the production in four days. The show marked its 100th performance in November, and continued to run through the winter. It was then presented at the Charlottetown Festival, and on tour in Atlantic Canada, running a total of 18 months.

Cullen and Baldaro were among the writers contracted to concoct the 1968 edition of Spring Thaw, a topical revue that had been produced annually since 1948. The show premiered in St. John's, Newfoundland, in late January, to negative response, and had toured across the country for about two months, before the producer called in another writer, Roderick Cook, to try to fix it.

In 1969, after the Bohemian Embassy closed, while in London he was recruited for a sketch comedy show, Canada Goose, broadcast by the BBC.

Back in Canada, in late 1969 and early 1970, he briefly revived the Bohemian Embassy in a location at Rochdale College.

In addition to his regular contracts with Wayne and Shuster, he appeared in supporting roles in other television productions, including a 1973 adaptation of the Sweeney Todd story, for a CBC series titled Purple Playhouse, and in feature films, including Only God Knows (1974) and My Pleasure Is My Business (1975).

In early 1974, Cullen was a writer on Global Television's Everything Goes, a late-night variety program, airing weeknights, that ran for 100 episodes, where he worked alongside talent including Dan Aykroyd, Ken Finkleman, and Martin Short.

The Bohemian Embassy returned in 1974, when Cullen, having finished his Global contract, accepted an offer to resurrect the coffeehouse at Toronto's new cultural facility, Harbourfront. His Beyond the Fringe colleague, Roy Wordsworth, joined him to manage the performance venue, which lasted about two years.

Cullen continued to foster comic talent, as artistic co-director, with Wordsworth, of the Leacock Festival of Humour, in Orillia, Ontario, for seven years in the late 1970s and early 1980s. With journalist Peter Gzowski, Cullen also co-hosted the Winnipeg Folk Festival, from 1975 to 1980, and in 1983. As a supporter and "presence," and for his contributions to folk music culture, he was named to the Mariposa Folk Festival's Hall of Fame, in 2006.

In the 1980s and into the early 1990s, he also owned Le Strip, a burlesque house on Toronto's Yonge Street. He initially had a half-interest in the club, investing to help a friend, and later owned it outright.

Cullen revived the Bohemian Embassy twice more, for short runs: for nine months in 1979, as a CBC radio program, and in 1991–92, for almost one year, at 318 Queen Street West, in Toronto.

As a student, John Robert Colombo had organized readings at the original Bohemian Embassy, and Cullen enlisted him to help with literary events at the 1970s incarnation of the venue. At that time Cullen published four poems—"Pigeon or Chicken"; "If it isn't Art, it's Grace"; "From Above"; and "Hey!"—in the Tamarack Review, of which Colombo was an editor. Cullen included 37 undated poems in his 2007 memoir, The Bohemian Embassy: Memories and Poems.

== Personal life ==
Cullen reportedly had only two significant romantic relationships with women. He and Jan Tennant had dated when students at Humberside. In the mid-1960s, when she was a high-school teacher, they became a romantic couple, a relationship that lasted several years. Cullen encouraged her to audition at the CBC, and she was hired into entry-level positions, finally advancing into an on-air position, becoming one of the service's first female announcers and newsreaders. He was married to Janet Inksetter, later a bookseller and owner of Annex Books in Toronto, for five years in the 1970s.

Cullen died of complications following prostate surgery. He was predeceased by his two sisters.

Cullen was an avid explorer of indigenous cultures. Throughout his life, Don enjoyed travelling and immersing himself into tribal culture by living with and visiting the Jivaro people several times for example, becoming friends. It was his favourite type of holiday, to go somewhere "lost" to the colonial world, as much as possible and interact and develop friendships on indigenous terms. In that, he was so ahead of his time, a curious explorer of the real cultures of the world says long term personal friend Anne Marie Lalancette.
