= Mary Jane and Winston Young =

- Origin: Toronto, Ontario, Canada
- Genres: Folk
- Years active: 1960s
- Past members: Mary Jane Young; Winston Young

Mary Jane and Winston Young were a Toronto-based folk music singing duo. They were active as early as 1960 in the early days of the North American urban Folk Revival. They were part of the movement that tied folk music to a socially progressive view of the world.

The Youngs performed various kinds of folk based music, including Irish tunes and political tunes and American tunes and songs from Ewen McColl.

== History ==
In November 1960 the Youngs' music was featured on the BBC program Roundabout.

The pair were regular performers at Toronto's folk club and cultural centre, the Bohemian Embassy Coffee House which was run by actor/cultural animator Don Cullen. The Youngs didn't record anything but a few live recordings. They appeared alongside many Canadian acts, Gordon Lightfoot, Ian and Sylvia, Joni Mitchell and Stan Rogers. They were to a significant part of the Toronto folk scene in the late fifties and early sixties.

The Youngs performed at the first Mariposa Folk Festival. In 2001 they performed as part of a Bohemian Embassy reunion night fundraiser for the Humanist Association of Toronto.
