= 8th ACTRA Awards =

Canadian television awards ceremony

- Date: April 4, 1979
- Hosted by: Gordon Pinsent, Don Harron

Highlights
- Best TV Program: A Gift to Last
- Best Radio Program: The Other Self

Television/radio coverage
- Network: CBC Television

The 8th ACTRA Awards were presented on April 4, 1979. The ceremony was hosted by Gordon Pinsent for television categories, and Don Harron for radio categories.

== Television ==
Best Television Program	Earle Grey Award
A Gift to Last; The Champions; Tyler	Helen Burns, Catsplay; Robin Gammell, The Jesus Trial; R. H. Thomson, Tyler
Best Continuing TV Performance	Best Supporting TV Performance
Gordon Pinsent, A Gift to Last; Ruth Springford, A Gift to Last; Al Waxman, King of Kensington	Murray Westgate, Tyler; Donald Davis, The Newcomers: "1832"; Moya Fenwick, Catsplay
Best TV Variety Performance	Best Television Host
Brian McKay, Clowns; Patsy Gallant, The Patsy Gallant Show; Rich Little, Rich Little's Christmas Carol	Roy Bonisteel, Man Alive; Hana Gartner, Take 30; Brian Linehan, City Lights
Best Television Public Affairs Broadcaster	Best Children's Television Program
Eric Malling, The Fifth Estate: "Law for Sale"; Roy Bonisteel, Man Alive; Adrienne Clarkson, The Fifth Estate	Pencil Box; Encounter with Orion; The Friendly Giant
Best Writing, Television Drama	Best Writing, Television Comedy/Variety
Roy MacGregor, Tyler; Carol Bolt, One Night Stand; Charles Israel and George Ryga, The Newcomers: "1927"	Jeri Craden, Rob Iscove and Peter Mann, Clowns; Benjamin Gordon and Lorne Frohman, The Rimshots; Johnny Wayne, Frank Shuster, Ted Lonsdale and Kate Lonsdale, Wayne and Shuster
Best Writing, Documentary
John Kastner, The Fifth Estate: "Four Women"; Eric Malling, The Fifth Estate; Harry Rasky, The Peking Man

== Radio ==
Best Radio Program	Best Radio Host
The Other Self; Signature: "McCarthyism and the Arts"; Sunday Morning: "Operation White Knight"	Warren Davis, Panning for Gold; Don Harron, Morningside; Betty Kennedy, The Betty Kennedy Show
Best Radio Actor	Best Radio Variety Performance
Ruth Springford, The Other Self; Marilyn Lightstone, The Other Self; Florence Paterson, A Place to Come Back To	Gay Claitman, Robert Cameron and Nancy White, Lies My Mother Told Me; Dave Broadfoot, Royal Canadian Air Farce; Nancy White, Sunday Morning
Best Radio Public Affairs Broadcaster	Best Writing, Radio Drama
Terence McKenna, Sunday Morning: "Regina v Roberts"; Arthur Cole, Gordon Sinclair and Betty Kennedy, Let's Discuss It; Barbara Frum and Alan Maitland, As It Happens	Tom Gallant, Darlin' Dolly; Margaret Atwood, Estelle; Marian Waldman, Beth and Rosamund
Best Writing, Radio Variety	Best Writing, Radio Documentary
Gay Claitman and Nancy White, Lies My Mother Told Me; Roger Abbott, Dave Broadfoot, Martin Bronstein, Don Ferguson and John Morgan, Royal Canadian Air Farce; W.O. Mitchell, Live at the St. Lawrence	Terence McKenna and Stuart McLean, Sunday Morning: "Operation White Knight"; Robert Harris and Bob McKeown, Muhammad Ali; Rob Lucy and Jay Mowat, Albert Establishment

== Journalism and special awards ==
Gordon Sinclair Award	Foster Hewitt Award
Barbara Frum, As It Happens; Robert Cooper, Ombudsman; John Robertson and Mike Allder, 24 Hours	Brian Williams; Ernie Afaganis; Dave Hodge
John Drainie Award
Ruth Springford
