= David, We're Pregnant! =

David, We're Pregnant! is a 1973 book of pregnancy-themed comic strips by Lynn Johnston (originally under the name "Lynn Franks", her name at the time), based on cartoons that she had drawn to decorate the ceilings of her obstetrician's office. It is Johnston's first book, selling over 300,000 copies, and (along with its sequels Hi Mom, Hi Dad and Do They Ever Grow Up) is credited with having launched her career as a cartoonist.

Despite the book's success, Johnston's original publisher never paid her, and in 1976 she was forced to repurchase the rights to the material from him for $25,000.
