= Nancy White (singer-songwriter) =

Canadian singer-songwriter (born 1944)

- Born: November 11, 1944 (age 82)
- Origin: Charlottetown, Prince Edward Island, Canada
- Genres: folk, comedy
- Occupation: singer-songwriter
- Instruments: guitar, piano, vocals
- Years active: 1970s-present

Nancy Adele White (born November 11, 1944) is a Canadian singer-songwriter, whose humorous and satirical songs on political and social topics were a regular feature on CBC Radio from 1976 to 1994 on the public affairs show Sunday Morning.

== Background ==
Originally from Charlottetown, Prince Edward Island, White was educated at Dalhousie University. She began her career as a journalist in Charlottetown and Halifax, occasionally performing her comedic songs at coffeehouse nights, and began pursuing music and theatre more actively after moving to Toronto in 1970.

== Career ==
In Toronto she performed in a theatrical production of Under Milk Wood, originated the role of Ophelia in Cliff Jones's musical Rockabye Hamlet (originally known as Kronborg: 1582), and was a co-creator and star of the musical revues Hey Seester, You Want My Sailor? and Ice Folly. Beginning in 1976 she was a regular contributor of comedic songs to CBC Radio's Sunday Morning, frequently appearing on the program until she was dropped as part of a revamp of the program's format in 1994.

In 1978 she released Civil Service Songwriter, her debut album as a recording artist. She has since released numerous other albums, blending both her comedic songs and forays into more serious songwriting.

She created a number of works with comedian Gay Claitman, including the radio play Lies My Mother Told Me, the short run comedy series Gee, That's a Cute Dress Marjene, and the stage comedy revue Little Pink Lies. She won two ACTRA Awards at the 8th ACTRA Awards in 1979 for Lies My Mother Told Me, for Best Radio Variety Writing with Claitman and Best Radio Variety Performance with Claitman and Robert Cameron.

Following her departure from Sunday Morning in 1994, she was an occasional contributor to CBC's weekend pop culture magazine Definitely Not the Opera and the CTV Television Network's newsmagazine series W5, and performed on tour with the political comedy duo Double Exposure.

She was one of the writers, with Bob Johnston and Jeff Hochhauser, of the musical Anne & Gilbert, based on the Lucy Maud Montgomery books Anne of Avonlea and Anne of the Island.

== Personal life ==
She was formerly married to the composer and keyboardist Doug Wilde. Their daughters, Suzy and Maddy Wilde, are also musicians. Suzy composes for musical theatre and Maddy is an indie rock musician formerly of the band Spiral Beach.

== Discography ==
=== Albums ===
- Civil Service Songwriter (1978)
- Sort of Political
- What Should I Wear to the Revolution (1982)
- Unexpected (1983)
- The Sunday Morning Tapes (1984)
- Unimpeachable (1987)
- Bimbolandia (1988)
- Momnipotent: Songs for Weary Parents (1990, Mouton)
- Pumping Irony (1993, CBC/Mouton)
- Homely for the Holidays (1994)
- Songs of the Spanish Civil War (1994)
- Gaelic Envy and Other Torch Songs (1998, Borealis)
- Unexpected (CD re-release 2001, Borealis)
- Stickers on Fruit (2002, Borealis)

=== Compilations ===
- Canoesongs, Volume One
- Canoesongs, Volume Two
- The World's Greatest Hockey Hits, Volume One

== Bibliography ==
- Topical Punch: Saucy Songs by Nancy White (Toronto 1986)
