= Michael Boncoeur =

Michael Boncoeur was the stage name of Michael Vadeboncoeur, a Canadian sketch comedian, most noted as one half of the comedy duo La Troupe Grotesque with Paul K. Willis in the 1970s and 1980s.

== Career ==
Originally from Vancouver, British Columbia, he had local stage acting roles as a child, most notably as the young Ptolemy in a 1962 production of Caesar and Cleopatra. He and Willis formed La Troupe Grotesque in 1968, moving to Toronto that year but struggling to get established until Riff Markowitz hired them as writers for his television series Party Game and The Hilarious House of Frightenstein.

They performed as a sketch comedy duo on stage, both in Toronto and regular touring throughout both Canada and the United States. Willis was the primary writer of most of their material, while Boncoeur took on the staging and costuming.

They were also invited to join the cast of The Hart and Lorne Terrific Hour, but declined to audition out of fear that the show would steal their material; as well, they filmed a CBC Television pilot, although there is no historical evidence that it was ever actually broadcast, and had plans to record a comedy album for GRT Records which never materialized.

The duo's comedy was strongly influenced by British sketch comedy. They disdained the influence of American comedy, including the rise of improv comedy at The Second City, although they were both major fans of the more scripted and formatted SCTV despite disliking Second City's improvisational stage shows; one of their regular pieces in that era parodied improv comedy by asking the audience to provide male and female character suggestions, which Willis and Boncoeur would perform "improvisationally" for exactly two or three lines of dialogue before Boncoeur's character would say "I wish I was in Paris", with the sketch then transitioning into its true purpose, an elaborately staged song-and-dance number. They were also noted for the edginess of some of their comedy; after the news of the Jonestown massacre broke in November 1978, their show that evening opened with the duo distributing Kool-Aid to the audience.

In addition, Boncoeur was noted for being open and unapologetic about being gay, which was a relative novelty in comedy in their era; many of the troupe's local shows in Toronto were performed at the Manatee, a gay club. Boncoeur was also noted for a drag impersonation of Queen Elizabeth II, performed with a frame around his head to suggest a postage stamp.

In 1976, they created the CBC Radio comedy series Pulp and Paper with Gay Claitman. The following year, they toured the stage revue Plain Brown Wrapper.

They ceased touring in 1980, but reunited in 1984 to create two CBC Radio comedy specials, a spoof of CBC programming called This Hour Has 17 Programs in June and the year-end review The Year of Living Obnoxiously in December. They received ACTRA Award nominations for Best Writing, Radio Variety for This Hour Has 17 Programs at the 14th ACTRA Awards in 1985, and for The Year of Living Obnoxiously at the 15th ACTRA Awards in 1986. In 1985, Willis also created the radio comedy special If You Love This Government, a political satire in which Boncoeur did not appear on air but served as a producer.

He also served as a wardrobe master in theatre, most notably for a national touring production of the musical Cats in 1988.

== Murder ==
On March 24, 1991, Boncoeur's body was found in his Forest Hill apartment; he had been stabbed to death and robbed of numerous possessions including his motorcycle.

Although the Toronto Star reported having received a strange unidentified phone call asking "Has a gay man been murdered in the Toronto area in the last 10 hours?" the day before his body was found, it was unclear whether the motive for his killing was homophobia or simple robbery. His motorcycle was later found in the Cabbagetown area of the city, following early reports that it had been seen on Highway 400 near King City.

The earliest police reports also inaccurately claimed that Boncoeur was an "AIDS patient", which Willis responded was not the case.

Two youths were later arrested and charged with the murder. One was an established acquaintance of Boncoeur's, while the other, Adam Blake Harris, was a classmate of the first youth at a reformatory school. They had shown up at Boncoeur's home earlier on the day of his death with the intention of robbing him; however, as Boncoeur had to leave for a show, he gave them $20 to buy food, with which they instead bought a knife. They returned to his home again later in the evening; Boncoeur, who intended to go to bed early as he had another show the next day, allowed them to sleep on his couch for the night, following which Harris stabbed him in the carotid artery soon after he fell asleep. However, some of the media coverage falsely appeared to imply that Boncoeur might have predatorily lured the boys home for sex.

Harris was tried as an adult as he had reached age 18 by the time of the trial; he was found guilty and sentenced to life imprisonment in 1994. There is no media record of whether the other youth ever went to trial.

== Legacy ==
The undertones of homophobia in response to his death, both the false claim about his HIV status and the sexual predation allegations, motivated his lifelong friend Lynn Johnston to bring a gay character into her comic strip For Better or For Worse to help combat anti-gay stereotypes and discrimination. Michael Patterson's classmate and friend Lawrence Poirier, who had previously been seen in the strip as a minor supporting character, came out as gay in 1993.

Stand and Deliver: Inside Canadian Comedy, a 1997 book about the history of Canadian comedy by Eye Weekly entertainment writer Andrew Clark, faced some criticism for misidentifying Boncoeur as "Michael Rapaport".
