= Paul K. Willis =

Canadian sketch comedian (1947–1999)

Paul Kenneth Willis (August 2, 1947 – November 24, 1999) was a Canadian sketch comedian, most noted as one half of the comedy duo La Troupe Grotesque with Michael Boncoeur in the 1970s and 1980s.

== Career ==
Both natives of Vancouver, British Columbia, where they were also childhood friends of cartoonist Lynn Johnston, Willis and Boncoeur formed La Troupe Grotesque in 1968. They moved to Toronto that year, but struggled to get established until Riff Markowitz hired them as writers for Party Game and The Hilarious House of Frightenstein.

They performed as a sketch comedy duo on stage, both in Toronto and regular touring throughout both Canada and the United States. Willis was the primary writer of most of their material, while Boncoeur took on the staging and costuming.

They were also invited to join the cast of The Hart and Lorne Terrific Hour, but declined to audition out of fear that the show would steal their material; as well, they filmed a CBC Television pilot, although there is no historical evidence that it was ever actually broadcast, and had plans to record a comedy album for GRT Records which never materialized.

The duo's comedy was strongly influenced by British sketch comedy. They disdained the influence of American comedy, including the rise of improv comedy at The Second City, although they were both major fans of the more scripted and formatted SCTV despite disliking Second City's improvisational stage shows; one of their regular pieces in that era parodied improv comedy by asking the audience to provide male and female character suggestions, which Willis and Boncoeur would perform "improvisationally" for exactly two or three lines of dialogue before Boncoeur's character would say "I wish I was in Paris", with the sketch then transitioning into its true purpose, an elaborately staged song-and-dance number. They were also noted for the edginess of some of their comedy; after the news of the Jonestown massacre broke in November 1978, their show that evening opened with the duo distributing Kool-Aid to the audience.

In 1976, they created the CBC Radio comedy series Pulp and Paper with Gay Claitman. The following year, they toured the stage revue Plain Brown Wrapper.

They ceased touring in 1980, but reunited in 1984 to create two CBC Radio comedy specials, a spoof of CBC programming called This Hour Has 17 Programs in June and the year-end review The Year of Living Obnoxiously in December. They received ACTRA Award nominations for Best Writing, Radio Variety for This Hour Has 17 Programs at the 14th ACTRA Awards in 1985, and for The Year of Living Obnoxiously at the 15th ACTRA Awards in 1986.

In 1985, Willis also created the radio comedy special If You Love This Government, a political satire in which Boncoeur did not appear on air but served as a producer. The cast of If You Love This Government were nominated for Best Radio Variety Performance at the 15th ACTRA Awards. Over the next few years, he also created the comedy special Investigation of a Corporation Above Suspicion, about a political takeover of the CBC, and the serial Windsor Hassle, a satire of the British royal family.

He was the creator and executive story editor of the short-lived CBC sitcom Mosquito Lake in 1989, but would later describe the resulting product as one that he lost creative control of, and was never fully satisfied with. He was later a writer for Friday Night! with Ralph Benmergui.

In the 1990s he created the comedy serial Rumours and Borders for CBC Radio. In 1997 he wrote a number of scripts for a potential television version of Rumours and Borders, but the project was placed on hold after he was diagnosed with pancreatic cancer.

== Personal life ==
He was married to Leatrice Spevack, a writer and arts administrator best known for discovering and serving as the first manager for Jim Carrey, for a number of years in the 1970s. From 1981 until his death, he lived in "unmarried bliss" with actress Kate Gallant.

Although his career as a writer continued into the 1990s, he was widely perceived by many of his friends as never emotionally recovering from Boncoeur's murder in 1991.

He died of pancreatic cancer on November 24, 1999.
