= Sean o huigin =

Canadian poet and writer

John Higgins (born 27 June 1942), known as sean o huigin /ˈʃɔːn oʊ ˈhɪɡiːn/, is a Canadian poet and writer. o huigin began teaching poetry in the early 1960s before beginning to write in the late 1970s. From the 1980s to 1990s, o huigin primarily wrote children's poetry for Black Moss Press. Of his publications, The Ghost Horse of the Mounties won the 1983 Canada Council Children's Literature Prize in English literature and became the first book of poetry to win this award. In 1986, his poem "Acid Rain" was made into a short film by the National Film Board of Canada.

== Biography ==
John Higgins was born in Brampton, Ontario on 27 June 1942. He renamed himself "sean o huigin", the Irish language version of his name in all lowercase letters, as a tribute to Padraig O Broin. In the early 1960s, o huigin began using sound poetry while teaching schoolchildren in North America and Great Britain. After he began writing in the late 1970s, o huigin primarily wrote children's poems for Black Moss Press during the 1980s and 1990s. Of his works, o huigin won the 1983 Canada Council Children's Literature Prize in English literature for The Ghost Horse of the Mounties. Upon winning the award, o huigin was the first person to win the Canada Council Children's Literature Prize with a book of poetry.

His poem "Acid Rain" appeared in Scary Poems for Rotten Kids before it was made into a National Film Board of Canada short film in 1986. Scary Poems for Rotten Kids was later republished in 1988 with illustrations by Scott Hughes and John Fraser. The following year, o huigin released a ten poem collection, Monsters He Mumbled, which included two of his previous works from the mid 1980s. His works during the 1990s included King of the Birds in 1992 and A Dozen Million Spills and Other Disasters in 1993.

== Writing styles and themes ==
In his children's works, o huigin uses short lines of poetry on scary subject matters while sparsely using capital letters and punctuation. With Blink: A Strange Book for Children, o huigin divided his prose into two separate vertical columns to fit with the poem's theme of seeing separate things with each individual eye. Other writing styles that o huigin used were a pourquoi story for King of the Birds and didacticism for Atmosfear. For The Ghost House of the Mounties, o huigin based the story on the frightened horses owned by the North-West Mounted Police during a 1874 Manitoba storm. He also wrote two books about a real-life stray dog called Pickles who lived in Windsor, Ontario.
