= Lynn Johnston =

Canadian cartoonist

Lynn Franks Johnston
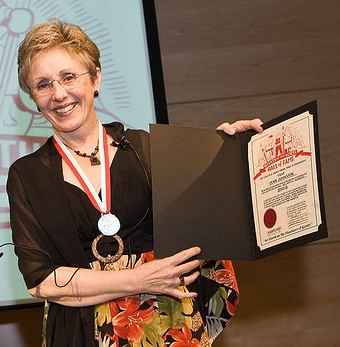
- Johnston at her induction into The Giants of the North: the Canadian Cartoonists Hall of Fame in August 2008
- Born: Lynn Ridgway; May 28, 1947 (age 79) Collingwood, Ontario, Canada
- Notable works: For Better or For Worse

Lynn Johnston (born May 28, 1947) is a Canadian cartoonist and author, best known for her newspaper comic strip For Better or For Worse. She was the first woman and first Canadian to win the National Cartoonist Society's Reuben Award.

== Early life ==
Born Lynn Ridgway in Collingwood, Ontario, she was raised in North Vancouver, British Columbia, where she was a close childhood friend of comedians Paul K. Willis and Michael Boncoeur. She attended the Vancouver School of Art (now Emily Carr University of Art and Design) with hopes of making a living as an artist. After working briefly in animation, most notably as an uncredited cel colorist on The Abbott and Costello Cartoon Show, she married in 1969 and moved back to Ontario, where she worked as a medical artist at McMaster University for five years. Johnston's illustrations are in storage in McMaster's medical archive. They include depictions of routine hospital happenings of the time, such as a father smoking in the waiting room.

While expecting her first child, she drew single-panel cartoons for the ceiling of her obstetrician Murray Enkin's office. Those drawings were published in her first book, David, We're Pregnant! which was published in 1973 under her then name of Lynn Franks (and subsequently republished under the name of Lynn Johnston) and became a best seller. After her divorce, she did freelance commercial and medical art in a studio converted from a greenhouse. Hi Mom! Hi Dad!, a sequel to David, was published in 1975. Shortly thereafter, she met and married dental student Rod Johnston.

== For Better or For Worse ==
In 1978, the Johnstons and their two children relocated to Lynn Lake, Manitoba. She was asked by Universal Press Syndicate if she was interested in doing a comic strip. She sent twenty copies of a strip called The Johnstons, based on her family "since we were the only people I knew I could draw over and over again with some consistency." Much to her surprise, the syndicate approved of the initial strips and offered her a twenty-year contract. After a six-month "work-up" period, the strip first appeared in newspapers throughout Canada under the title For Better or For Worse. The strip has been carried by about 2000 newspapers in Canada, the U.S. and 20 other countries.

Many story lines draw from her family's real-life experiences. Her main characters are named after the middle names of her husband and children, with the exception of the mother, as Lynn Johnston has no middle name. Instead, she elected to name the protagonist Elly, in honor of a friend of hers who died at a young age. Her friend and Canadian comedian Michael Boncoeur inspired the controversial story about Lawrence's coming out. Deanna was based on her son Aaron's high school sweetheart, who died in a car crash years after their relationship ended. Johnston's niece Stephanie is developmentally disabled and her experience is shared in recent story lines on the integration of developmentally disabled students in April's class. Elizabeth's teaching career was based on daughter Kate's decision not to pursue a career in education, but provided Johnston with a chance to imagine how that might have turned out.

The characters in For Better of For Worse have aged in "real time". On August 31, 2008, Johnston herself appeared in the Sunday strip, which was supposed to be the end of the cartoon, and announced that she would take the story back nearly 30 years to soon after its beginning, with half of the material to be new and the other half repeats. The "new" material was actually reworked versions of older strips with retouched artwork and new dialogue that was sometimes only tweaked to use modern expressions or product names in place of older ones. On seldom occasion an entire strip or a panel has been redone, such as Michael or Elizabeth spanked being turned into a "time out". One spanking strip that remained was a story arc where Michael was spanked by John for hitting another child, and it percolating into a discussion with Elly that she disagreed that spanking was the proper remedy (although she agreed with John that Michael's violent attitude had to be nipped in the bud). Other strips, such as Elly getting annoyed and then hurling something at the back of John's head (such as a coffee cup) were also censored. As the strip was a family strip, issues of throwing a hard object behind someone's back raised issues of spousal abuse.

== Personal life ==
Since the 1990s, Johnston has been notably forthcoming in her discussion of the abuse inflicted on her by her mother and her first husband, and of being unprepared to be a mother to her son Aaron—topics that have also been reflected in the strip. A column by Jan Wong of The Globe and Mail, reprinted in Lunch with Jan Wong, notably portrayed Johnston as somewhat difficult and irascible.

Johnston resided in the Northern Ontario town of Corbeil for many years during For Better or For Worse's run. Her daughter Katie also lived in Corbeil and worked at the For Better or For Worse studio, while her son Aaron works in the television industry in Vancouver, BC. In September 2007, Lynn and Rod Johnston announced their separation and intention to divorce. Johnston had talked about either ending For Better or For Worse or handing it off to another cartoonist, but changed her mind as a result of her split from her husband of over 30 years.

In September 2015, Johnston and her daughter moved back to North Vancouver.

Johnston had a close friendship with Charles M. Schulz, creator of Peanuts. She wrote the introduction to one of the volumes of Fantagraphics Books' series The Complete Peanuts.

On 13 March 2014, Library and Archives Canada announced that it had acquired material to add to its Johnston collection, including 3282 drawings, 296 watercolours, 244 photographs, about 3.5 m of textual items, and a few other objects.

== Awards and honours ==
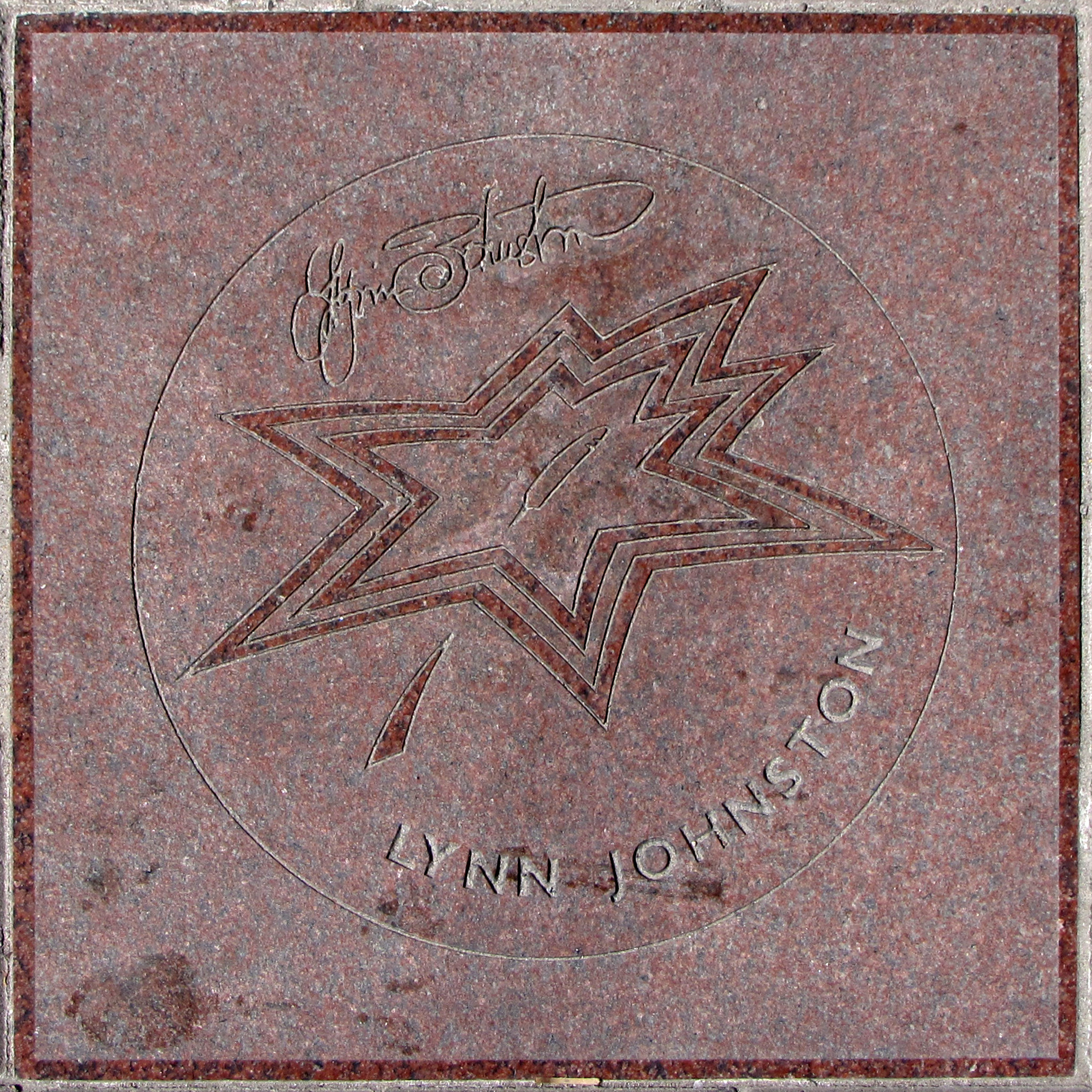
Johnston's star on Canada's Walk of Fame

- 1985 – Reuben Award, the first woman and first Canadian to win
- 1987 – Gemini Award, Best Cartoon Series
- 1990 – Honorary Degree, Doctor of Letters, Lakehead University, Thunder Bay, Ontario
- 1991 – National Cartoonist Society Newspaper Comic Strip Award
- 1992 – Made a Member of the Order of Canada, the country's highest civilian honour
- 1993 – Honorary Degree, Doctor of Laws, McMaster University, Hamilton, Ontario
- 1994 – Finalist for the Pulitzer Prize for a story on Lawrence's coming out
- 1999 – Honorary Degree, Doctor of Laws, University of Western Ontario, London, Ontario
- 2000 – Honorary Degree, Doctor of Letters, Nipissing University, North Bay, Ontario
- 2000 – Honorary Degree, Doctor of Letters, Emily Carr Institute of Art and Design, Vancouver
- 2001 – Comic of the Year, Editor and Publisher
- 2002 – Queen Elizabeth II Golden Jubilee Medal
- 2002 — Inducted into the Women Cartoonists Hall of Fame (Friends of Lulu)
- 2003 – A star on Canada's Walk of Fame in Toronto
- 2004 – Debwewin Citation from the Anishinabek Nation for excellence in Aboriginal-issues journalism
- 2007 – Made a member of the Order of Manitoba
- 2008 – Inducted into the Canadian Cartoonist Hall of Fame
- 2008 – Inducted into the National Cartoon Museum Hall of Fame
- 2012 – Queen Elizabeth II Diamond Jubilee Medal
- 2019 - Sergio Award from the Comic Art Professional Society
