= Mysterious Canada =

1988 book by John Robert Colombo

- Title page for Mysterious Canada: Strange Sights, Extraordinary Events, and Peculiar Places (1988)
- Author: John Robert Colombo
- Language: English
- Subject: Paranormal
- Genre: Non-fiction
- Publisher: Doubleday Canada Limited
- Publication date: 1988
- Publication place: Canada
- ISBN: 0-385-25150-5

Mysterious Canada: Strange Sights, Extraordinary Events, and Peculiar Places is a 1988 reference book written by Canadian writer John Robert Colombo, chronicling the paranormal in Canada.

The book is split up by province or territory "in the form of a gazetteer", preceded by a Preface and Acknowledgments, and followed by a Bibliography and Index. Mysterious Canada presents more than 500 mysteries, originating from 365 locations.

The author acknowledges in his forward that "anyone who looks long and hard enough will no doubt find rational explanations for the mysteries in this book." He believes that all of the events have explanations, or are just rooted in myth and folklore.
