= Everything Goes (Canadian TV series) =

- Genre: variety
- Presented by: Norm Crosby; Mike Darow; Catherine McKinnon
- Country of origin: Canada
- Original language: English
- No. of seasons: 1
- No. of episodes: 100

Production
- Producers: John Aylesworth; Frank Peppiatt
- Running time: 90 minutes

Original release
- Network: Global
- Release: 7 January – 24 May 1974

Everything Goes is a Canadian variety television series broadcast by Global Television Network in 1974.

== Premise ==
The series was hosted by American Norm Crosby and Canadians Mike Darow and Catherine McKinnon. Moe Koffman led a studio orchestra.

Guest entertainers during the series run included Canadian and international entertainers such as Tony Bennett, Burns and Schreiber, Rosemary Clooney, Ella Fitzgerald, Rich Little, Oscar Peterson, Martin Short, Grant Smith and Peter Foldy, .

== Production ==
John Aylesworth and Frank Peppiatt, the writing team who also created Hee Haw, produced Everything Goes. Series writers included Dan Aykroyd, Don Cullen, Ken Finkleman, Earl Pomerantz, and Martin Short.

== Scheduling ==
The series was initially scheduled to air at 10:45 p.m. It faced unexpected competition from The Tonight Show Starring Johnny Carson when the United States introduced daylight saving time in January 1974 due to the 1973 oil crisis. Carson's series was traditionally seen in Ontario at 11:30 p.m., but Canada remained on standard time – which meant that 11:30 p.m. in the United States was still 10:30 p.m. in Canada, putting the shows in direct competition. Unable to simply readjust its entire schedule to move the program out of Carson's way, the network quickly added a repeat airing at 4 p.m. the following afternoon.

100 episodes of Everything Goes were produced at a cost of $1.5 million, providing much of Global's Canadian content requirements. After the series completed a 20-week run on 24 May 1974, the weekday evening time slot was replaced by the Global News Hour from 10:30 p.m. By that time, Global encountered financial difficulties which led to the cancellation of Everything Goes and many of its other series by that August.

Some U.S. stations aired the show as well. WAGA in Atlanta carried the show during the winter and spring of 1974 at 5 p.m. against reruns of The Mod Squad on WSB and Bonanza on WXIA. By summer the station was airing The Mike Douglas Show at that time, and would continue to do so for six years.

== Reception ==
Toronto television ratings from BBM Canada indicated that the evening broadcasts of Everything Goes attracted a one to two percent audience share at the end of its first month. It competed against The Merv Griffin Show which attracted 7 to 10 percent of the ratings, while The Tonight Show Starring Johnny Carson received 20 to 25 percent of the audience. Afternoon rebroadcasts received one percent of the viewership as it competed with a 25 percent share for The Mike Douglas Show.

Ray Bennett of the Windsor Star noted that the series was "effortlessly Canadian, not forced in the manner of so many CBC shows which come out with a maple leaf front and centre", although faulting it for one audience participation segment of "a mindless bit of business which is usually a weakly-written dramatic scene intended to be funny". Bennett further noted that the Burns and Schreiber guest performances involved "routines that would never see the light of day on U.S. networks."
