= John Robert Colombo =

Canadian writer, editor, and poet

John Robert Colombo CM
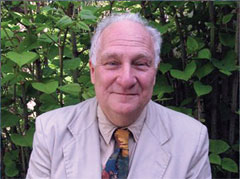
- Colombo in 2011
- Born: March 24, 1936 (age 90); Kitchener, Ontario, Canada
- Occupations: Writer, folklorist, editor in chief, public speaker, radio and television personality
- Spouse: Ruth Colombo (passed April 26, 2024)
- Children: 3
- Writing career
- Period: 1957–present
- Genres: Folklore, science fiction, poetry, humour, aphorisms, reference, quotations, translations, armorial bearing, Canadian native studies, almanac, maps
- Notable works: Colombo's Canadian Quotations (Hurtig, 1974); Colombo's Canadian References (Oxford, 1976)
- Notable awards: Harbourfront International Literary Award, Honorary doctorate in literature by York University, Member of the Order of Canada
- Website: colombo.ca

John Robert Colombo CM (born March 24, 1936) is a Canadian writer, editor, and poet. He has published over 200 titles, including major anthologies and reference works.

== Early life ==
Colombo was born in Kitchener, Ontario, in 1936. He attended the University of Toronto, where he began organizing literary events in the late 1950s. He started writing and publishing poetry in the early 1960s; his first book of poetry Lines for the Last Days was illustrated by William Kurelek.

Through his imprint, Hawkshead Press, he published Margaret Atwood's first collection of poetry in 1963. He also facilitated the appearance of first books of fiction written by Hugh Hood and Alice Munro, as well as the first mass-market publication of a science-fiction story by Robert J. Sawyer. He served as literary manager of the old Bohemian Embassy in Toronto, writing poetry and pioneering "found poetry" in Canada. He later moved into editorial positions with prominent Toronto's publishing houses, including McClelland and Stewart and Hurtig. During this period, he edited George Grant's Lament for a Nation, and served as managing editor of the Tamarack Review, then the leading literary quarterly.

== Writing career ==
In the early 1970s, Colombo began working on the first of many anthologies, a collection of quotations from prominent Canadians titled Colombo's Canadian Quotations.

Following the success of the quotations collection, Colombo went on to publish dozens of collections, ranging from bibliographies of Canadian reference works to collections of folk tales, stories of the paranormal, and UFO sightings. As of 2014, Colombo has published over 200 titles, making him the second-most prolific author in Canadian literary history. His anthology writing earned him the nickname "the Master Gatherer" among Canadian writers and literary critics. He was dubbed "Canada's Mr. Mystery" for his compilations of the paranormal. In the 1990s, Colombo began publishing his writing through his own imprint, Colombo and Company.

== Works ==
=== Poetry ===
- Lines for the Last Day (1960)
- The Mackenzie Poems (1966)
- Miraculous Montages (1966)
- The Great Wall of China (1966)
- William Lyon Mackenzie Rides Again! (1967)
- Abracadabra (1967)
- John Toronto (1969)
- Neo Poems (1970)
- The Great San Francisco Earthquake and Fire (1971)
- Leonardo's Lists (1972)
- Praise Poems (1972)
- Translations from the English (1974)
- The Sad Truths (1974)
- The Great Collage (1974)
- Proverbial Play (1975)
- Mostly Monsters (1977, 1995)
- Variable Cloudiness (1977)
- Private Parts (1978)
- The Great Cities of Antiquity (1979)
- Poems of the Inuit (1981)
- Selected Poems (1982)
- Selected Translations (1982)
- Windigo (1982)
- Recent Poems (1982)
- Songs of the Indians (1983)
- Off Earth (1987)
- Songs of the Great Land (1989)
- The Mystery of the Shaking Tent (1993)
- Voices of Rama (1994)
- Luna Park / One Thousand Poems (1994)
- Space Poems (1995)
- Contrails (1996)
- Earlier Lives (1996)
- Ether / Rewords (1997)
- What is What (1998)
- Interspaces (1999)
- Impromptus (2000)
- Half a World Away (2000)
- All the Poems of JRC (3 vols., 2005)
- All the Aphorisms of JRC (2006)
- Autumn in August (2006)
- Parts of the World (2007)
- End Notes (2008)
- Indifferences: New Aphorisms (2009)
- A Far Cry (2009)
- End of Greatness (2010)
- Poems of Space and Time (2010)
- Entresol (2011)
- Impronderables (2011)
- Less of Light (2012)
- A Standing Wave (2013)
- A World of Differences (2014)
- Late in the Day (2015)

=== Reference works ===
- Colombo's Canadian Quotations (1974)
- Colombo's Names & Nicknames (1974)
- Colombo's Concise Canadian Quotations (1976)
- Colombo's Canadian References (1976)
- Colombo's Book of Canada (1978)
- Colombo's Book of Marvels (1979)
- The Canada Colouring Book (1980)
- Toronto's Fantastic Street Names (1982)
- Colombo's 101 Canadian Places (1983)
- Colombo's Canadiana Quiz Book (1983)
- Canadian Literary Landmarks (1983)
- 1001 Questions about Canada (1986)
- Colombo's New Canadian Quotations (1987)
- Mysterious Canada (1988)
- 999 Questions about Canada (1989)
- Writer's Map of Toronto (1991)
- The Dictionary of Canadian Quotations (1991)
- Ufos over Canada: Personal Accounts of Sightings and Close Encounters (1991)
- The Canadian Global Almanac (1992)
- Writer's Map of Ontario (1992)
- The Little Blue Book of UFOs (1992)
- Colombo's All-Time Great Canadian Quotations (1994)
- Omnium Gatherum (1994)
- Ghost Stories of Ontario (1995)
- Shapely Places (1996)
- Haunted Toronto (1996)
- Quotable Canada (1998)
- Mysteries of Ontario (1999)
- Colombo's Famous Lasting Words (2000)
- The Midnight Hour (2004)
- Terrors of the Night (2005)
- The Penguin Dictionary of Popular Canadian Quotations (2006)
- A Little Book of Facts about a Really Big Country (2007)
- Footloose: A Commentary on the Books of Gordon Sinclair (2008)
- Whistle While You Work (2008)
- Fascinating Canada (2011)
- Jeepers Creepers (2011)
- Ghosts over Canada (2014)
- Uncommonplaces (2014)

=== Anthologies ===
- Richard Maurice Bucke: Catalogue (1963)
- Probings (1968)
- Colombo's Hollywood (1979)
- Canadian Science Fiction and Fantasy (1979)
- Other Canadas (1979)
- Blackwood's Books (1981)
- Friendly Aliens (1981)
- Not to Be Taken at Night (1981)
- Years of Light (1982)
- Extraordinary Experiences (1989)
- Mysterious Encounters (1990)
- Mackenzie King's Ghost (1991)
- UFOs over Canada (1991)
- Dark Visions (1992)
- Walt Whitman's Canada (1992)
- Worlds in Small (1993)
- The New Consciousness (1994)
- Close Encounters of the Canadian Kind (1994)
- Ghosts Galore! (1994)
- Strange Stories (1994)
- Closer than You Think (1998)
- Marvellous Stories (1998)
- Singular Stories (1999)
- Weird Stories (2000)
- Ghosts in Our Past (2000)
- Ghost Stories of Canada (2000)
- The New Consciousness: Selected Papers of R.M. Bucke (2007)
- The Big Book of Canadian Ghost Stories (2008)
- The Big Book of Canadian Hauntings (2009)
- The Sumuru Omnibus by Sax Rohmer (2010)
- Tears of Our Lady by Sax Rohmer (2010)
- The Crime Magnet: Stories by Sax Rohmer (2013)
- Pipe Dreams: Occasional Writings of Sax Rohmer (2013)
- The Northrop Frye Quote Book (2014)
- The Sax Rohmer Miscellany (2014)

=== Humour ===
- Colombo's Little Book of Canadian Proverbs (1975)
- 222 Canadian Jokes (1981)
- Colombo's Last Words (1982)
- Colombo's Laws (1982)
- René Lévesque Buys Canada Savings Bonds (1983)
- Great Moments in Canadian History (1984)
- The Toronto Puzzle Book (1984)
- Canada First Quiz (1984)
- Quotations from chairman Lamport (1990)
- Ogdenisms (1994)
- Metro's Goldwyn Mayor (1995)
- Erotica Canadiana (1995)
- 666 Canadian Jokes (1996)
- Slightly Higher in Canada (1996)
- Colombo's Doublebook of Laws & Last Lines (1996)
- The Stephen Leacock Quote Book (1996)
- Iron Curtains (1996)
- Kidstuff (1996)
- All About Us (1998)
- More Iron Curtains (1998)
- Yet More Iron Curtains (2000)
- Canadian Capers (2000)
- The Big Book of Canadian Jokes (2013)

== Recognition ==
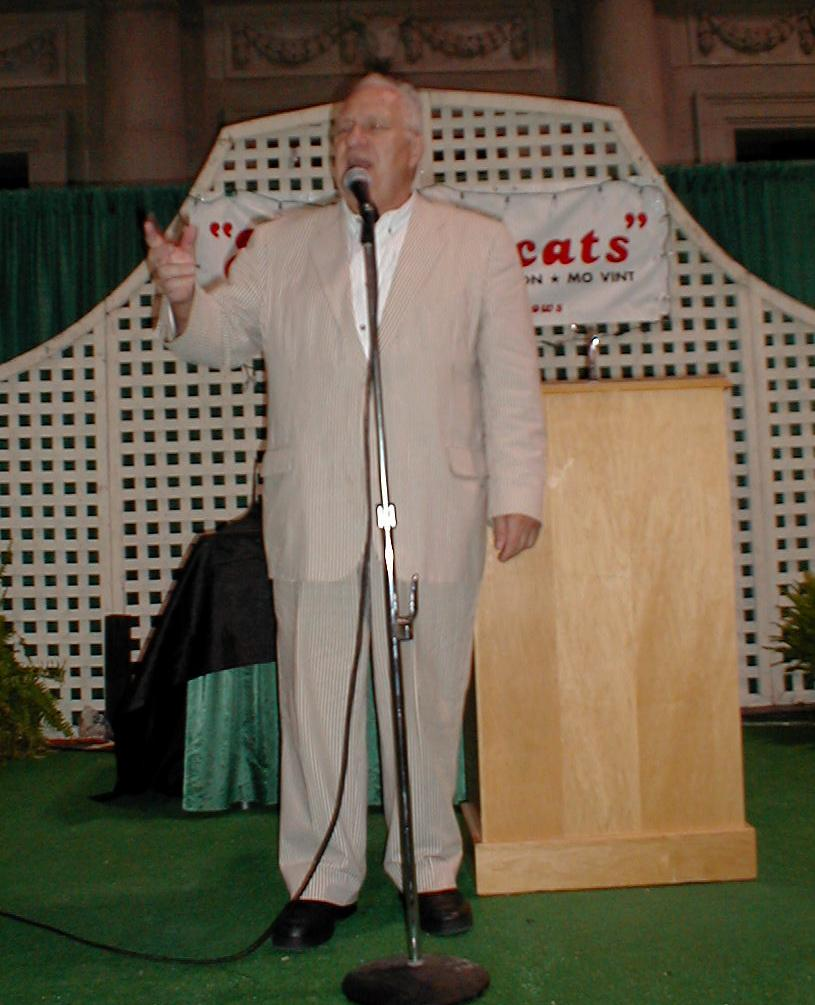
Colombo making a presentation entitled: "Haunted Toronto", at the Direct Energy Centre during the Canadian National Exhibition, on August 27, 2009.

- Harbourfront International Literary Award
- Honorary doctorate in literature by York University
- Member of the Order of Canada
- The Centennial Medal
- The Order of Cyril and Methodius (first class)
- Esteemed Knight of Mark Twain
- A Fellow, Northrop Frye Centre, Victoria College, University of Toronto.
