= Canadian humour =

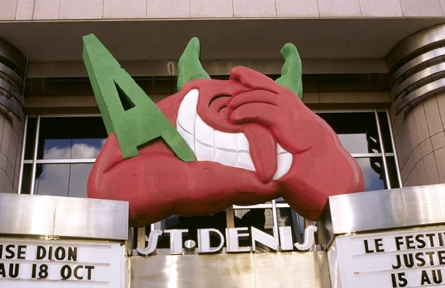
Just for Laughs Festival in Montreal, Québec at the Saint-Denis Theatre (Victor was later removed.)

Humour is an integral part of the Canadian identity. There are several traditions in Canadian humour in both English and French. While these traditions are distinct and at times very different, there are common themes that relate to Canadians' shared history and geopolitical situation in North America and the world. Though neither universally kind nor moderate, humorous Canadian literature has often been branded by author Dick Bourgeois-Doyle as "gentle satire," evoking the notion embedded in humorist Stephen Leacock's definition of humour as "the kindly contemplation of the incongruities of life and the artistic expression thereof."

The primary characteristics of Canadian humour are irony, parody, and satire. Various trends can be noted in Canadian comedy. One thread is the portrayal of a "typical" Canadian family in an ongoing radio or television series. Examples include La famille Plouffe, with its mix of drama, humour, politics and religion and sitcoms such as King of Kensington and La Petite Vie. Another major thread tends to be political and cultural satire: television shows such as CODCO, Royal Canadian Air Farce, La Fin du monde est à 7 heures and This Hour Has 22 Minutes, monologuists such as Yvon Deschamps and Rick Mercer and writers, including Michel Tremblay, Will Ferguson and Eric Nicol draw their material from Canadian and Québécois society and politics. Other comedians portray absurdity; these include the television series The Kids in the Hall and The Frantics, and musician-comedians such as The Arrogant Worms, Three Dead Trolls in a Baggie and Bowser and Blue. Elements of satire are to be found throughout Canadian humour, evident in each of these threads, and uniting various genres and regional cultural differences.

As with other countries, humour at the expense of regional and ethnic stereotypes can be found in Canada. Examples are 'Newfie' jokes (with 'Newfie' being a colloquial term for a person from the island of Newfoundland) and jokes revolving around English-speaking Canadians' stereotype of French Canadians, and vice versa.

Humber College in Toronto and the École nationale de l'humour in Montreal offer post-secondary programs in comedy writing and performance. Montreal is also home to the bilingual (English and French) Just for Laughs festival and to the Just for Laughs museum, a bilingual, international museum of comedy.

== Literature ==
According to author Stephen Scobie, Canadian humorous writing has tended more towards prose than poetry. An early work of Canadian humour, Thomas McCulloch's Letters of Mephibosheth Stepsure (1821–23) appeared in the Halifax weekly Acadian Recorder. Northrop Frye described McCulloch's satirical letters as "quiet, observant, deeply conservative in a human sense"; he asserted that McCulloch's persona, the "conventional, old-fashioned, homespun" farmer, was an extension of a centuries-old satiric tradition, and that the letters set the tone for later comedic writing in Canada.

Compared to McCulloch's dry and understated style, Thomas Chandler Haliburton showed the same conservative social values in the brash, overstated character of Sam Slick, the Yankee Clockmaker. Haliburton's Sam Slick persona in The Clockmaker (1836), as Arthur Scobie notes in The Canadian Encyclopedia, "proved immensely popular and, ironically, has influenced American humour as much as Canadian."

Authors responded with folk humour and satire to the domination of 19th-century French Canadian culture by the Catholic Church. Napoléon Aubin satirized Quebec public life in his journals Le Fantasque (1837–45) and Le Castor (1843), and through his theatre troupe, Les Amateurs typographiques, established in 1839. He was imprisoned during that same year for his views. This cosmopolitan tradition is also seen in the journalism of Arthur Buies, editor of La Lanterne canadienne (1868–69), a highly satirical journal of that era.

Light comedy that mocked local customs was typical of 19th-century theatre in Quebec. Examples include Joseph Quesnel's L'Anglomanie, ou le dîner à l'angloise (1803), which criticized the imitation of English customs, and Pierre Petitclair's Une partie de campagne (1865). More serious dramas attacked specific targets: the anonymous Les Comédies du status quo (1834) ridiculed local politics, and Le Défricheteur de langue (1859) by Isodore Mesplats, (pseudonym of Joseph LaRue and Joseph-Charles Taché), mocked Parisian manners. Other examples of theatrical satire were Félix-Gabriel Marchand's comedy, Les faux brillants (1885) and Louvigny de Montigny's Les Boules de neige (1903), which took aim at Montreal's bourgeoisie. Humorous magazines in French included La Guêpe, "journal qui pique", published in Montreal 1857–1861.

By the early 20th century, the satirical tradition was well developed in English Canada as exemplified in the writing of Stephen Leacock. In Sunshine Sketches of a Little Town (1912), Leacock, already known for his satirical wit, used tragic irony and astute insight in examining day-to-day, small-town life. The book remains a classic of Canadian literature, and was followed by Arcadian Adventures with the Idle Rich in 1914. An annual Canadian literary award, the Stephen Leacock Memorial Medal for Humour, is named in his memory. The award is presented to the year's best work of humorous literature by a Canadian. Donald Jack, three-time winner of the Leacock Medal, wrote a number of comedies for the stage, radio, and television, but is best known for his nine-part series of novels about aviator Bartholomew Bandy.

Following the Révolution tranquille in Quebec, theatrical satire reappeared in 1968 with Michel Tremblay's play Les Belles sœurs, written in Québécois joual. The controversial play picked apart the myth of a stable bourgeois Quebec society with a mix of realistic comedy and allegorical satire. Following Tremblay's lead, Jean Barbeau exposed Quebec popular culture in La Coupe stainless (1974). Tremblay and Barbeau set the stage for reviews such as Broue (1979), a collective production, which toured English-speaking Canada as Brew (1982).

Humorous fiction in French Canada draws from the oral tradition of folk songs and folktales which were the common coin of humour in the 19th century. Only a few of these folk tales surfaced in writing prior to the 20th century. However, contemporary writers such as Jacques Ferron (Contes du pays incertain, 1962) in Quebec and Antonine Maillet in Acadian New Brunswick (La Sagouine, 1974, and Pélagie-la-Charrette, 1979), rely extensively on folk humour and popular culture. Other Quebec writers noted for their humour include Roger Lemelin, Gérard Bessette, Jacques Godbout, Roch Carrier and Yves Beauchemin. Beauchemin's picaresque novel Le Matou (1981) is the all-time best-selling novel in Quebec literature.

The plain talking alter-ego as an instrument of satire continued with Robertson Davies' series of Samuel Marchbanks books (1947–67) and John Metcalf's James Wells in General Ludd (1980). Davies is one of many Canadian writers of "serious" literature who were also known for humour in their work. Margaret Atwood, Farley Mowat, Paul Quarrington, Mordecai Richler, Raymond Fraser, Carol Shields, W. O. Mitchell, Ray Guy, Pierre Berton, M.A.C. Farrant and Miriam Toews are all well-known writers of mainstream literature who have also been acknowledged for using humour and wit in their writing. Many other writers of Canadian humour have been published as newspaper or magazine commentators, including Gary Lautens, Richard J. Needham, Eric Nicol, Joey Slinger, Will Ferguson, Marsha Boulton and Linwood Barclay.

Humour is also central to the work of Canadian children's writers such as Gordon Korman, Dennis Lee and Robert Munsch.

== Music ==
Particularly in recent years, Canada has produced a number of musical groups who have been described as "comedy rock". Bands such as Barenaked Ladies, Odds, Crash Test Dummies, Les Trois Accords, The Awkward Stage and Rheostatics are sometimes misunderstood as being strictly novelty bands, but in fact many of their songs use humour to illuminate more serious themes. A number of other acts, such as Corky and the Juice Pigs, Arrogant Worms, Three Dead Trolls in a Baggie and Bowser and Blue write specifically comedic songs.

Nancy White is a noted Canadian musical satirist, whose comedic folk songs about Canadian culture and politics have regularly appeared on CBC Radio programs.

In addition to more serious material on his primary albums, folk musician Geoff Berner — who has also run for political office as a candidate of the Rhinoceros Party — frequently releases pointedly satirical songs, such as "Official Theme Song for the 2010 Vancouver / Whistler Olympic Games (The Dead Children Were Worth It!)", as free downloads from his website.

Don Ast, a stand-up comedian who performed in character as befuddled Ukrainian immigrant Nestor Pistor, had his greatest popular success with an album in which he sang country songs in character as Pistor. His single "Winestoned Plowboy", a parody of Glen Campbell's "Rhinestone Cowboy", was a hit on Canada's country music charts in 1977; Pistor returned to more conventional standup comedy thereafter, but received three Juno Award nominations for Comedy Album of the Year in the next three years.

Jann Arden, a singer-songwriter is known as one of Canada's funniest live performers. She portrayed a fictionalized version of herself in the CTV sitcom Jann. Rapper Shad tackles weighty topics with his lyrics but is also known for using humour; for one of his most successful singles to date, "The Old Prince Still Lives at Home", he filmed a video that essentially parodied of the opening credits to The Fresh Prince of Bel Air.

Another noted Canadian musical comedian is Mary Lou Fallis, an opera singer who performs both in classical opera roles and as the comedic character "Primadonna", a touring stage show in which she parodies popular stereotypes of opera divas.

Canadian heavy metal frontman Devin Townsend is known for using humour in his music. Projects such as Punky Bruster and Ziltoid the Omniscient are heavily comedy driven, and Devin's heavy metal band, Strapping Young Lad, use satire and sarcastic tongue in cheek lyrics as well.

== Radio ==
Many of Canada's comedy acts and performers have started out on radio, primarily on the national Canadian Broadcasting Corporation (CBC) network.

While individual comedy show and segments have been around almost as long as the network, the focus has tended be more on specific shows featuring particular groups of comedians. The real beginnings of Canadian radio comedy began in the late 1930s with the debut of The Happy Gang, a long-running weekly variety show that was regularly sprinkled with corny jokes in between tunes. It debuted in 1938 and ran until 1959. The Wayne & Shuster show debuted on CBC radio in 1946, their more literate and classy humour regularly appearing on the airwaves well into the early 1960s. Max Ferguson's long-running shows After Breakfast Breakdown and the Max Ferguson Show featured short satirical skits based on current events, with a variety of characters voiced by Ferguson.

The Royal Canadian Air Farce started as a radio show debuting in 1973 featuring mainly political and some character-based comedy sketches. It ran for 24 years before making a permanent transition to television. It started a tradition of topical and politically satirical radio shows that inspired such programs as Double Exposure, The Muckraker and What a Week.

A zanier, more surreal brand of radio comedy was unveiled in the early 1980s with the debut of The Frantics' Frantic Times radio show, which ran from 1981 to 1986. Its smart and surreal style fostered a new take on Canadian radio comedy that was followed by the likes of successor shows as The Norm, Radio Free Vestibule and The Irrelevant Show.

Another enduring radio comedy program is The Vinyl Cafe, hosted by Stuart McLean. The show is centred around McLean's Dave and Morley stories, a series of narrated short stories about a Toronto family and their friends and neighbours; many of the stories have been compiled in book form, and the books have often won or been nominated for the Stephen Leacock Memorial Medal for Humour.

Satirical and zany elements merged in two of the more notable CBC radio comedy shows of the 1990s: The Dead Dog Cafe Comedy Hour offered bitingly satirical pieces from a First Nations perspective mixed in with general silliness, and Great Eastern, was set in a fictitious Newfoundland "national" radio station featuring improbable news stories, fictitious archival recordings, and unlikely archeological findings played straight.

CBC Radio continues to play an important part in developing comedy performers on radio. Madly Off In All Directions became a weekly national forum for regional sketch and stand-up comics, a practice that continues in the more recent series The Debaters and Laugh Out Loud.

Just for Laughs Radio, a channel programmed and broadcast by SiriusXM Satellite Radio to Canada and the United States, features predominantly Canadian comedy.

== Television ==
CBC Television's first Canadian-produced television series was Sunshine Sketches, an adaptation of Stephen Leacock's iconic humour book Sunshine Sketches of a Little Town.

Original Canadian television comedy begins with Wayne and Shuster, a sketch comedy duo who performed as a comedy team during the Second World War, and moved their act to radio in 1946 before moving on to television. They became one of Canada's most enduring comedy teams on Canadian television and in the United States as well: they appeared on The Ed Sullivan Show 67 times, a record for any performer. Their Julius Caesar sketch, Rinse the Blood off My Toga, with its legendary catchphrase, "I told him, Julie, don't go!", was particularly noted.

Wayne and Shuster continued to appear on CBC Television until the late 1980s, with specials that mixed new sketches with their classic material.

La famille Plouffe, the first regularly scheduled television drama in Canada, was produced in 1953 by Radio-Canada, in French. The program was broadcast on both English and French networks of CBC TV from 1954 to 1959, (in English as The Plouffe Family). It was a mix of drama, humour and social commentary about a working-class Quebec family in the post-World War II era. Another of the CBC's earliest productions was Sunshine Sketches, a television adaptation of one of the enduring classics of Canadian humour writing, Stephen Leacock's Sunshine Sketches of a Little Town.

Another pioneer in Canadian television comedy was, oddly, a news series. This Hour Has Seven Days, which debuted in 1964, was primarily meant as a newsmagazine, but its segments included political satire as well as serious news reports. Later series such as Royal Canadian Air Farce, This Hour Has 22 Minutes and Rick Mercer Report have all drawn on the tradition of political satire established by Seven Days, and have been among Canadian television's most popular comedy series in recent years.

Canadian born Lorne Michaels, who had moved from Toronto to Los Angeles in 1968 to work on Rowan and Martin's Laugh-In, launched the NBC comedy show Saturday Night Live in 1975. Over the years, several Canadians were part of the SNL cast, including Dan Aykroyd, Martin Short, and Mike Myers. Michaels also produced The Kids in the Hall for Canadian TV in the 1980s.

Many Canadian comedy shows, while not directly about politics per se, have made profound political statements by satirizing society and pop culture. This includes shows such as SCTV, Buzz and CODCO. CODCO, in particular, was intensely controversial at times for its use of comedy in tackling sensitive subjects; founding member Andy Jones quit CODCO in protest after the CBC refused to air a sketch that made a very explicit political statement about the Mount Cashel Orphanage child abuse scandal. The series History Bites was ostensibly a show presenting history in a sketch comedy, but frequently used the historic setting to satirize current political events and social trends.

Other shows, such as The Kids in the Hall, 4 on the Floor, Bizarre and Puppets Who Kill, revelled in absurdist humour, making household names out of characters such as Chicken Lady, Mr. Canoehead and Super Dave Osborne.

Other notable sketch series have included Zut!, The Gavin Crawford Show and The Holmes Show. Canadian television also frequently showcases stand-up comedians. The popular series Comics!, based around one comedian each week, has been the first national television exposure for many of Canada's current comedy stars. Another series, Just for Laughs, has for many years presented comedians appearing at the Montreal Comedy Festival. That series has also spawned the more recent Just For Laughs Gags, a practical joke show similar to Candid Camera.

Although several notable Canadian sitcoms have been produced, such as Excuse My French, King of Kensington, Hangin' In, Corner Gas, Little Mosque on the Prairie, Letterkenny, Mr. D, Kim's Convenience, and Schitt's Creek, many other sitcoms, including Material World, Mosquito Lake, Snow Job, Check it Out!, The Trouble with Tracy, Rideau Hall and Not My Department, have often fared poorly with critics and audiences. Critic Geoff Pevere has pointed out, however, that American television has produced a lot of bad sitcoms as well. The difference, according to Pevere, is that the economics of television production in Canada mean that whereas an unpopular American sitcom may be cancelled and largely forgotten after just a few weeks, Canadian television networks can rarely afford to lose their investment — meaning that a Canadian sitcom almost always airs every episode that was produced, regardless of its performance in the ratings.

According to television critic Bill Brioux, there are a number of structural reasons for this: the shorter seasons, typical of Canadian television production, make it harder for audiences to connect with a program before its season has concluded, and put even successful shows at risk of losing their audience between seasons because of the longer waiting time before a show returns with new episodes; the more limited marketing budgets available to Canadian television networks mean that audiences are less likely to be aware that the show exists in the first place; and the shows tend to resemble American sitcoms, in the hope of securing a lucrative sale to an American television network, even though by and large the Canadian sitcoms that have been successful have been ones, such as Corner Gas or King of Kensington, that had a more distinctively Canadian flavour.

On the other hand, Canadian television comedy fares much better when it breaks the sitcom form, especially with dramedy. Unconventional comedy series such as The Beachcombers, Due South, Made in Canada, Kenny vs. Spenny, Chilly Beach, The Newsroom, Primetime Glick, The Red Green Show, La Petite Vie, Seeing Things, Trailer Park Boys, Supertown Challenge, Les Bougon and Twitch City have been much more successful than most of Canada's conventional sitcoms, both in Canada and as international exports.

Canada has a national television channel, The Comedy Network, devoted to comedy. Its programming includes some of the classic Canadian comedy series noted above, repeats of several hit American and British series such as The Simpsons, South Park and Absolutely Fabulous, and original series such as Kevin Spencer, Odd Job Jack, The Devil's Advocates, Improv Heaven and Hell and Puppets Who Kill.

Rick Mercer began his career in 1990 with a touring one-man show, Show Me the Button, I'll Push It, about Canadian life in the immediate aftermath of the failed Meech Lake Accord. That show was a sellout success; in 1993, he made his television debut as one of the writers and performers on This Hour Has 22 Minutes. Mercer's "rants", short op-ed pieces on Canadian politics and culture, quickly became the show's signature segment. When he published a collection of rants in 1998 as Streeters, the book quickly became a bestseller. Mercer left 22 Minutes in 2000 to devote more time to his other series, Made in Canada. When that series ended its run, he launched the new Rick Mercer Report.

Another famous comedic export in the same era was Tom Green, whose surreal and sometimes grotesque humour on The Tom Green Show began as a community cable show in Ottawa before becoming a hit on MTV.

As with many other genres, Canadian television comedy also frequently plays with the topic of Canada's relationship with the United States. Mercer turned another 22 Minutes segment, Talking to Americans, into a 2001 television special, which was a ratings smash. In Talking to Americans, Mercer, in his 22 Minutes guise as reporter "J.B. Dixon", visited American cities to ask people on the street for their opinion on a Canadian news story — the joke for Canadians was that the news story was always fabricated, and either inherently ridiculous (e.g. a border dispute between Quebec and Chechnya or an annual Toronto polar bear hunt) or blatantly out of context (e.g. wishing Canadians a "Happy Stockwell Day".)

Another notable show, the sitcom An American in Canada, reversed that formula, finding comedy in the culture shock of an American television reporter taking a job with a Canadian TV station. Tom Green once played with this staple of Canadian comedy as well, during a controversial segment in which he burned a Canadian flag.

== Film ==
Film critic Barry Hertz created a list of the 23 best Canadian comedy films ever made for The Globe and Mail in 2023, although he included two films that had Canadian themes, settings and creative participants but were not Canadian productions:

- BlackBerry — Matt Johnson
- Coopers' Camera — Warren P. Sonoda
- Crime Wave — John Paizs
- The Decline of the American Empire (Le Déclin de l'empire américain) — Denys Arcand
- The Exchange — Dan Mazer
- The F Word — Michael Dowse
- FUBAR — Michael Dowse
- Goon — Michael Dowse
- Hobo with a Shotgun — Jason Eisener
- I Like Movies — Chandler Levack
- Kids in the Hall: Brain Candy — Kelly Makin
- Maps to the Stars — David Cronenberg
- Meatballs — Ivan Reitman
- My Internship in Canada (Guibord s'en va-t-en guerre) — Philippe Falardeau
- PG: Psycho Goreman — Steven Kostanski
- Scott Pilgrim vs. the World — Edgar Wright
- Seducing Doctor Lewis (La Grande séduction) — Jean-François Pouliot
- Starbuck — Ken Scott
- Strange Brew — Rick Moranis, Dave Thomas
- Turning Red — Domee Shi
- The Twentieth Century — Matthew Rankin
- Waydowntown — Gary Burns
- The Wrong Guy — David Steinberg

In addition to Hertz's own selections, sidebars asking other notable figures in Canadian comedy to identify their own choices singled out the films Rare Birds as a choice of Mercer and You're Sleeping Nicole as a favourite of Levack, while Mark Critch reiterated Hertz's choice of Seducing Doctor Lewis.

== Web ==
In the same vein as Air Farce and 22 Minutes, a number of notable web sites have emerged to publish articles that either satirize real events or wholly invent stories that lampoon aspects of Canadian culture. Frank magazine, which originated as a printed publication, has been joined in recent years by The Beaverton, The Daily Bonnet, and Walking Eagle News each broadly modelled after The Onion.

== Comedy clubs ==
Notable Canadian comedy clubs and showcases include The Second City branch in Toronto (originally housed at The Old Fire Hall), the Yuk Yuk's chain, and The ALTdot COMedy Lounge. The top clubs in Canada are Rumor's Comedy Club in Winnipeg, The Comic Strip in Edmonton, The Laugh Shop in Calgary, and Absolute Comedy in Ottawa.

== Awards ==
The Canadian Comedy Awards were founded by Tim Progosh and Higher Ground Productions in 1999, and present awards for achievements in Canadian comedy across a variety of domains, including live performance, radio, film, television, and Internet media.

The Canadian Screen Awards present a number of awards for television comedy, including Best Comedy Series and awards for performance, writing and direction in comedy series.

Just for Laughs and SiriusXM Canada stage an annual SiriusXM Top Comic competition for Canadian stand-up comedians. The annual Tim Sims Encouragement Award also provides a $2,500 prize to an emerging comedian.

The annual Stephen Leacock Memorial Medal for Humour is presented to works of comedic literature, across both fiction and non-fiction genres.

== See also ==
- List of Quebec comedians
- British humour
- Canadian comics
- American humor
- Canadian clowning
