= List of historic Toronto fire stations =

Historic Toronto fire stations are primarily in the downtown core and with the former Toronto Fire Department.

Fire stations built from the late 19th century and up to 1950s varied in style. Fire halls built from the 1950s to 1980s tended to be utilitarian in design and found in the suburbs (North York, Scarborough and Etobicoke). The latest fire stations are modern, but they often lack the character of older fire stations in the city.

Most fire halls built after the 1940s are demolished when they are retired and rarely re-used.

== A list of designs of historic fire stations in the city ==
=== Amsterdam ===
- Station 227
  - Built: 1905 as Toronto Fire Department (TFD) 17
  - Also known as "Kew Beach Fire Hall"
  - Location: 1904 Queen Street East, The Beach
  - Main structure: Three-storey Queen Anne Revival main structure with a clock tower and a single vehicle bay.
  - A tower is on the side of this structure.
  - Additional structures: An additional bay which was added later (1960).
- Station 226
  - Built: 1910-11 as TFD 22
  - Location: 87 Main Street, Upper Beaches
  - Main Structure: A two-storey main structure houses two vehicle bays. A tower is located at the rear of the building.
  - Additional Structure: Two-storey Romanesque Revival with a bay window structure. The original station (two-storey wood fire hall with tower) next door was demolished after 1911.

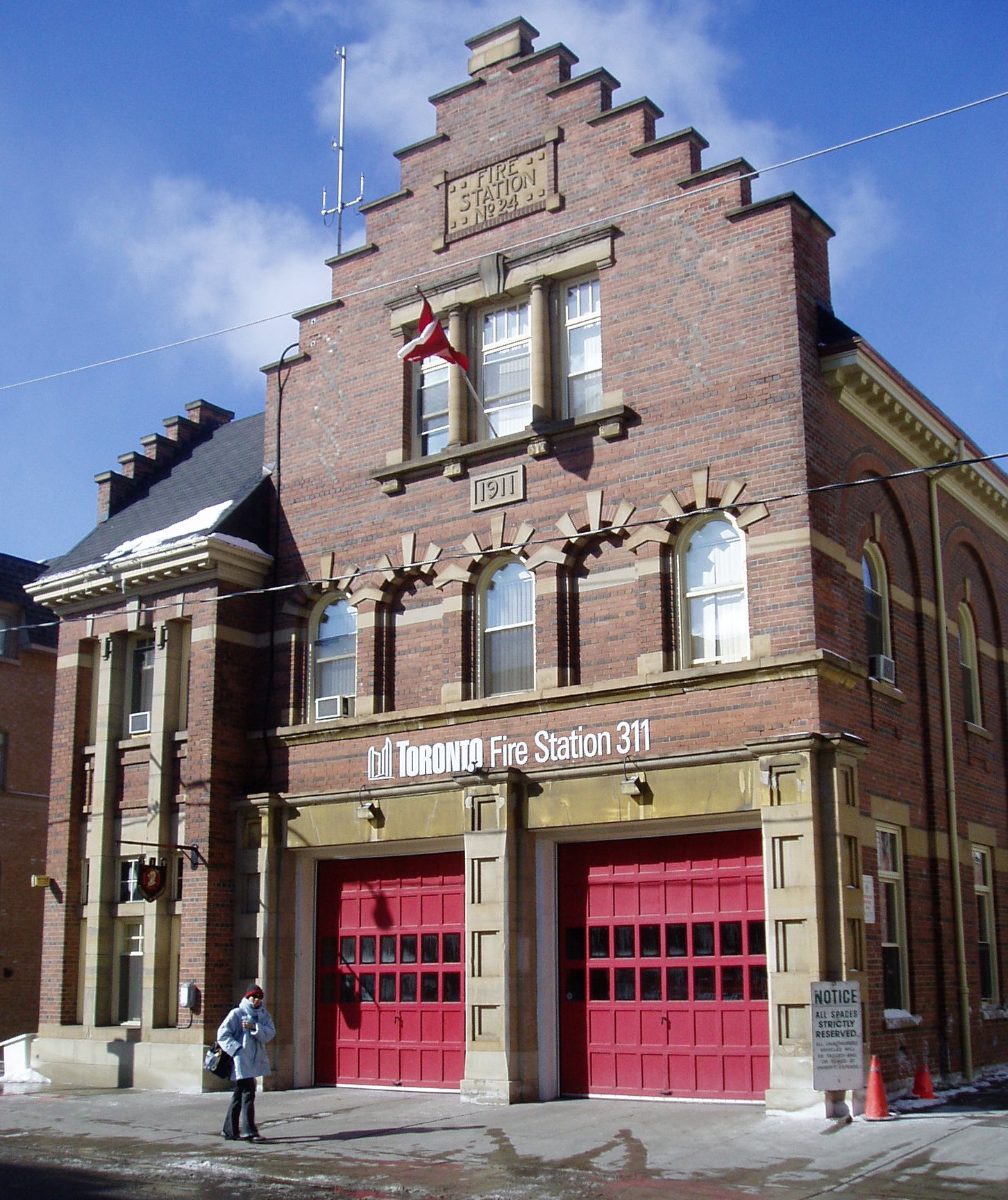
Station 311 at 20 Balmoral Avenue

- Station 311
  - Balmoral Fire Hall National Historic Site
  - Built: 1911 as TFD 24
  - Location: 20 Balmoral Avenue, Deer Park
  - Main Structure: A three-storey Queen Anne Revival main structure with two bays
  - Nickname: 311 – Knights of Balmoral
  - Media related to Balmoral Fire Hall at Wikimedia Commons

Located just off Yonge Street, south of St. Clair Avenue, Balmoral Fire Hall was built in an era when horses pulled hose wagons through its double doors. Still visible along the east wall is a second-storey projecting beam and doorway, where hay was hoisted into a loft for feed. In the rear, a tower capable of drying 50-foot hoses still stands. The building was designated a National Historic Site of Canada in 1990, for its rare adoption of the Queen Anne Revival style.

- Station 343
  - Built: 1916 as TFD 25
  - Location: 65 Hendrick Avenue, Wychwood
  - Main Structure: A three-storey main structure with two bays. Tower located in the rear.
- Station 344
  - Built: 1910 as TFD 23
  - Location: 240 Howland Avenue, Davenport
  - Main Structure: A three-storey main structure with two bays, similar to Station 226.
  - Additional Structure: Two-storey Victorian bay window structure.

=== Colonial revival ===
- Station 423
  - Built: 1959 as TFD 20 - Replacing previous hall on same site built in 1890 (WTJ Fire Hall No. 1)
  - Location: 358 Keele Street
  - Nickname: West Toronto - The Junction
- Station 325
  - Built: 1954 as TFD 7
  - Location: 475 Dundas Street East
  - Main Structure: A long two-storey main structure with three bays.
  - Nickname: Fort Apache

=== Residential ===
- Station 342
  - Built: 1912 as TFD 27
  - Location: 106 Ascot Avenue
  - Main Structure: A two-storey station with one small bay. Old Station 27 next door (1913) now semi-detach home
  - Nickname: Mid-Town Mob
- Station 424
  - Built: 1927 as TFD 31
  - Location: 462 Runnymede Road
  - Main Structure: Two-storey building which looks like a house-conversion with two bays. Built from the plans of an existing station located in Florida, the hall opened in July 1927 but was temporarily shut down again in October so a heating system could be retrofitted. This was the first fire station in the city designed to house internal combustion engined apparatus, although it was initially equipped with older "hand-me-down" vehicles from busier stations (the current pumper is only the second unused vehicle ever assigned to the station). The station no longer houses an aerial ladder truck (decommissioned in 2001) so the rear of the second bay has been retrofitted with bunker gear storage racks and can no longer accommodate an aerial. Station 131 (formerly TFD 34) was constructed on the same floor-plan starting the following year (but with an integral heating system)
- Station 425
  - Built: 1930 as Village of Swansea FD
  - Annexed to Toronto: 1967 as TFD 16
  - Location: 83 DeForest Road
  - Main Structure: Like Station 424, it looks like a house conversion. The single-storey building has two bays.
- Station 435
  - Built: 1930 as New Toronto FD
  - Annexed to Etobicoke: 1967, Etobicoke Fire Department Station 9
  - Location: 130 Eighth Street
  - Main Structure: This two-storey station was built in three stages with the four bays being the newer portion of the building.
  - Nickname: R435: The Lone Wolf

=== Tudor ===
- Station 131
  - Built: 1931 as TFD 34
  - Location: 3135 Yonge Street
  - Main Structure: A two-storey building with 2 garage bays. Sistership to station 424. Extensively retrofitted in 2003, to accommodate a taller aerial ladder truck, the floor of the apparatus bay was lowered. Prior to the lowering of the apparatus bay floor, pumper 131 and aerial 131 would roll out of the station which was slightly above grade of the driveway, down and out onto Yonge Street, after the floor was lowered the trucks had to drive up from the now below grade driveway and out onto Yonge Street.
- Station 134
  - Built: 1932 as TFD 28
  - Location: 16 Montgomery Avenue
  - Main Structure: A two-storey building which looks like the houses beside it.
- Station 346
  - Built: 1912 - as TFD 29, renumbered twice to 31, then 32.
  - Location: CNE grounds near the Dufferin Gates and currently fully operational year round
  - Main Structure: The two-storey structure has two bays and a five-storey clock tower.
  - Additional Structures: It is also home to Toronto EMS and Toronto Police Service stations.
  - Designed by: G.W. Gouinlock
  - Station is fully staffed and runs as R346
- Station 314
  - Built: 1929 - as TFD 3
  - Location: 32 Grosvenor Street near Yonge Street

=== Clock tower ===
- Station 312
  - Built: 1877 for Yorkville Fire Department, became TFD 10 upon annexation in 1883.
  - Location: 34 Yorkville Avenue
  - Main Structure: It is one of the city's oldest active fire halls. The two-storey structure has a five-storey clock tower with three bays (additional bay added later). It has a coat of arms from the old Yorkville Town Hall. It was restored in 1974.

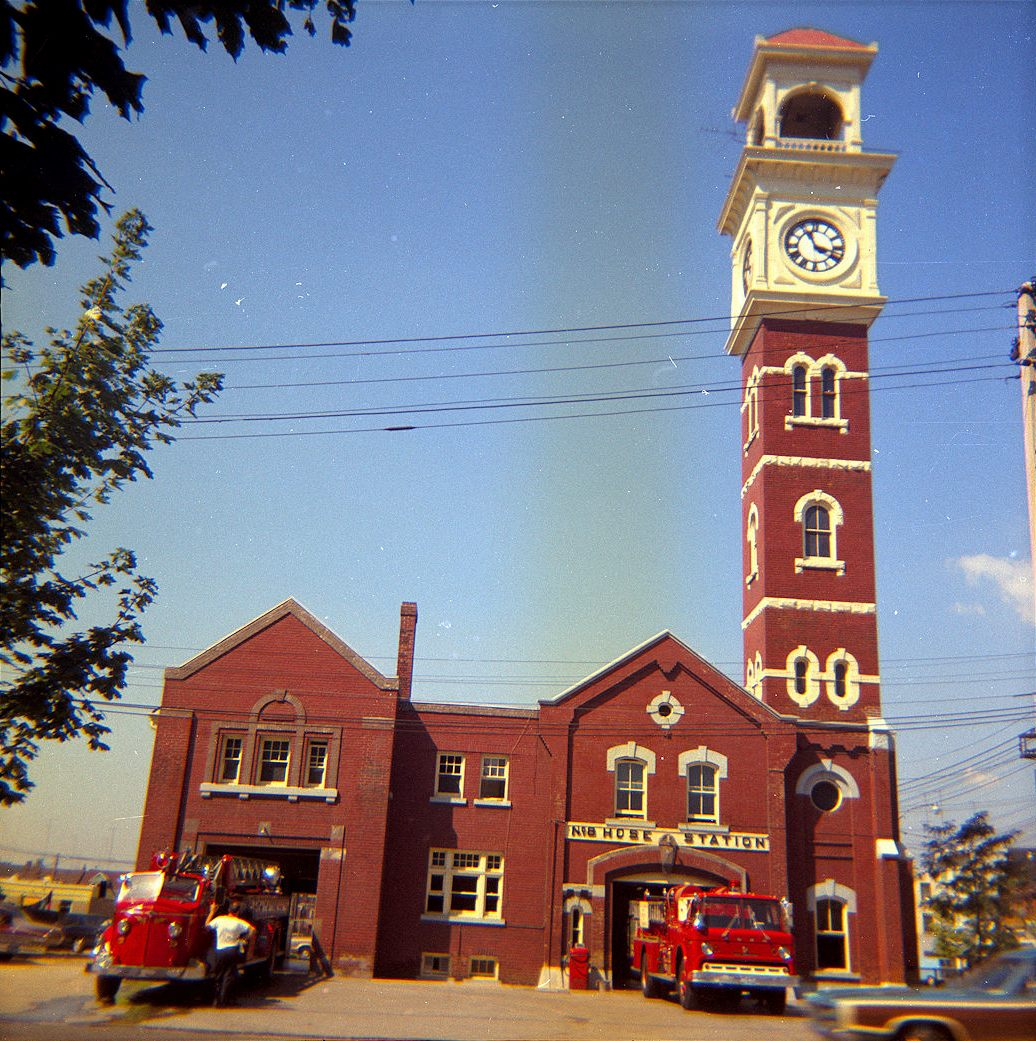
TFS Hall 8 with original tower

- Station 315
  - Built: 1878 as TFD 8, addition built 1922 for Ladder 29
  - Location: 132 Bellevue Avenue
  - Main Structure: Like Station 312, this is one of the city's oldest stations. It is a two-storey structure with an eight-storey clock tower. It has three bays, one from the original building. The current tower partially rebuilt in 1972, after the tower and its clock were set ablaze by an arsonist. The tower's clock was not salvageable, and a replica replaced the original when the tower was rebuilt over the course of 1972 to 1973.

Both Stations 312 and 315 are examples of Victorian Gothic architecture.

=== Other ===
- Station 30
  - Built: 1922
  - Location: 39 Commissioners Street
  - Main Structure: 2 floor brick hall with one bay (bricked off) designed by city architect J. J. Woolnough; not occupied until 1929. Later used by Toronto Professional Fire Fighters Union as offices and meeting hall and Greater Toronto Multiple Alarm Association as meeting place. Closed 2016, now being incorporated into the new park.
- Station 114
  - Built: 1989 as North York Fire Department Station 1
  - Location: 12 Canterbury Place / Yonge Street and Empress Avenue
  - Main Structure: It is the second building to bear the name Ivan M. Nelson Fire Station. The first was North York Fire Station 1 at 5125 Yonge at Empress Avenue. It is now the site of Empress Walk. The 1942 fire hall is gone, but the hose tower and archway entrance remain. The colonial revival was built in 1942 by Murray Brown on the site of a former municipal building. An additional bay was added in 1952. The station was torn down in 1989, but the hose tower was preserved and the stone entrance incorporated with the rear exit at the mall.
- Station 135
  - Built: 1923 as Forest Hill Fire Department Station 1 (Forest Hill was annexed into Toronto in 1967, it was renumbered Station 29) and Forest Hill Police Headquarters. It has now been replaced by a new fire station on the west side of Chaplin Crescent just north of Eglinton Avenue West.
  - Location: 641 Eglinton Avenue West
  - Main Structure: This semi-detached structure has two bays. In order to accommodate a third entrance for Chaplin station on the Eglinton Crosstown line, fire station 135 was closed and its eastern portion demolished. The western portion has been retained because of its heritage status.

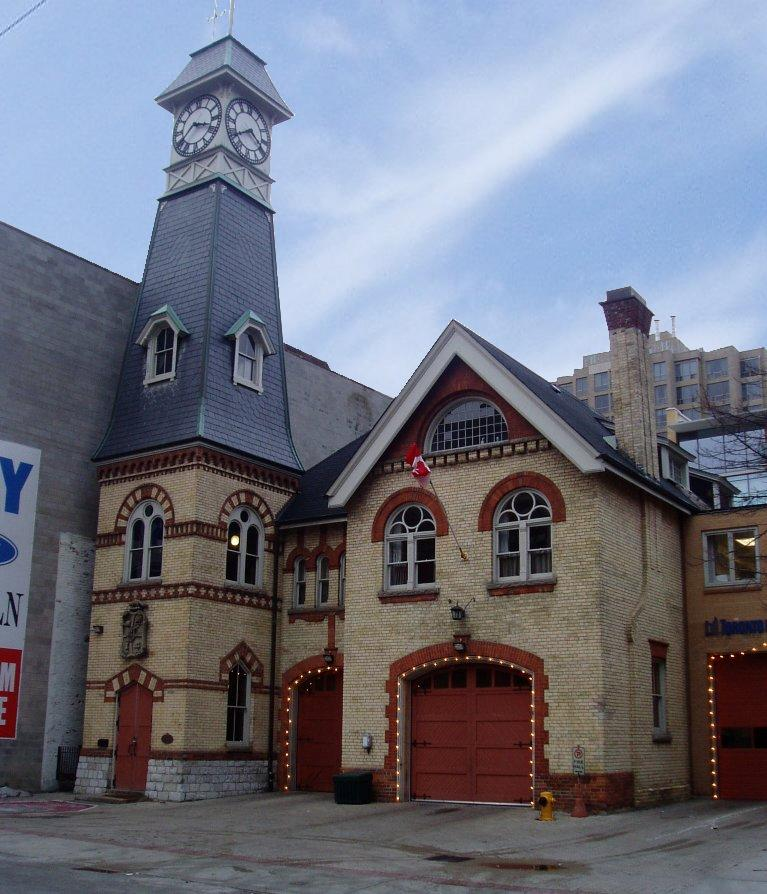
Station #312, originally TFD # 10

- Station 314
  - Built: 1926 as TFD 3
  - Location: 12 Grosvenor Street
  - Main Structure: The station is also called Pumper 314: Running the Strip. TFD 3 dates back to 1874, the original station is located on Yonge St. and is now a club. It has two bays.

=== Art Deco ===
- Station 324
  - Built: 1932 as TFD 12
  - Location: 840 Gerrard Street East
  - Main Structure: The station is very symmetrical with 3 bays.

=== Retired fire stations ===
- Hose Number 6
  - Built: 1847, rebuilt 1872
  - Location: 315 Queen Street West at John Street, east of Spadina Avenue
  - Main Structure: Like stations 315 and 312, it had a clock tower, but it has since been demolished.
- Fire Hall 9
  - Built: 1878, closed 1968
  - Location: 16 Ossington Avenue, near Queen Street West
  - Main Structure: Initially with clock tower, the clock has been removed, leaving a 'pilgrim hat' roof; home to University Health Network Western Men's Withdrawal Management Centre until 2019, now under renovation.
- Station 13
  - Built: 1885, closed 1972
  - Location: 1717 Dundas Street West at St. Clarens Avenue
  - Main Structure: Demolished and now Dundas/St. Clarens Avenue Parkette
- Lombard Street (Central) Fire Hall
  - Built: 1886; closed 1970
  - Location: 110 Lombard Street, west of Jarvis Street
  - Main Structure: Now home to Complections College of Makeup Art and Design (since 2012); previously Gilda's Club Toronto (1997–2011), and The Second City Comedy Club Toronto (1974–1997)
- Station 19
  - Built: 1910, closed 1963
  - Location: 386 Perth Avenue, near Dupont Street
  - Main Structure: Demolished after 1963; now site of home and renumbered
- Station 14
  - Built: 1885, closed 1963
  - Location: approximately 754 Ossington Avenue, between Northumberland Street and Bloor Street West
  - Main Structure: Similar to Station 315 with clock tower; demolished and now Ossington Station bus platform
- Station 31/33
  - Built: 1923
  - Location: 84 Cibola Avenue (moved from 11 Cibola in 1960)
  - ex-Station 31; retired 1993 and now home to Toronto Island Canoe Club at 101 Cibola

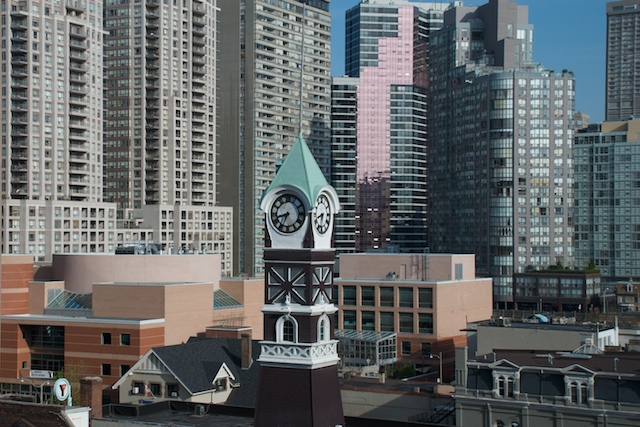
Tower of former Fire Hall 3

- Fire Hall Number 3
  - Built: 1872
  - Location: 484 Yonge Street
  - Main Structure: Like Hose Number 6, this station also had a clock tower. The tower remains, but the main structure has since been demolished, being replaced in this instance by a retail building.
  - July 2018 the retail structures around the clock tower has been demolished leaving the tower exposed. The site is now Halo Residences condominium complex and the tower is incorporated and restored into the new structure. A glass mural now depicts the former fire house.
- Fire Hall Number 1
  - Built: 1841
  - Location: 139-141 Bay Street - southeast corner of Bay and Temperance Street
  - Two-storey brick structure demolished in 1924 and now site of office tower
- Berkeley Fire Hall Number 4
  - Built 1905
  - Location: 70 Berkeley Street - southwest corner of Berkeley and Adelaide Street East
  - Two-storey brick structure with tower (clock portion removed) built by architect A. Frank Wickson; converted to theatre 1972 and home to Alumnae Theatre.
- Station 15 / Station 18
  - Built: 1900
  - Location: 220 Cowan Avenue - Cowan and Queen Street West
  - Hose 15 was created after Toronto annexed Parkdale in 1889. A temporary station was built just north of the Parkdale hall in 1900 and numbered 18 to house the company while a new station was built. The temporary building was retained until 1935. Station 15 was closed in 1972 when a new station opened at 140 Lansdowne Ave. and is now home to Masarayk-Cowan Community Centre (and located next to Gallery 1313, former Metro Toronto Police station 6 built in 1931).
- North York Fire Hall 1
  - Built: 1942
  - Location: 5125 Yonge Street at Empress Avenue
  - Colonial Revival building demolished to make way for retail-condo complex (Empress Walk) in 1989; tower moved to Princess Park in the rear.
- Scarborough Fire Hall 1
  - Built: 1925
  - Location: 351 Birchmount Road
  - Closed 1998 (company moved to TFS Station 225 at 3600 Danforth Road) and now Scarborough Fire Museum and Historical Building
- Mimico Fire Hall and Police Station
  - Built: 1929
  - Location: 13 Superior Avenue
  - Main Structure: Demolished in 2013 to make way for a nine-storey condominium.
- Islington Volunteer Fire Hall (4990 Dundas St W only)
  - Built: 1931
  - Addition added 4992 Dundas Street West; now private businesses

<Friebe, Marla. A History of the Toronto Fire Services 1874-2002. Toronto: City of Toronto, 2003>

=== Demolished Stations ===
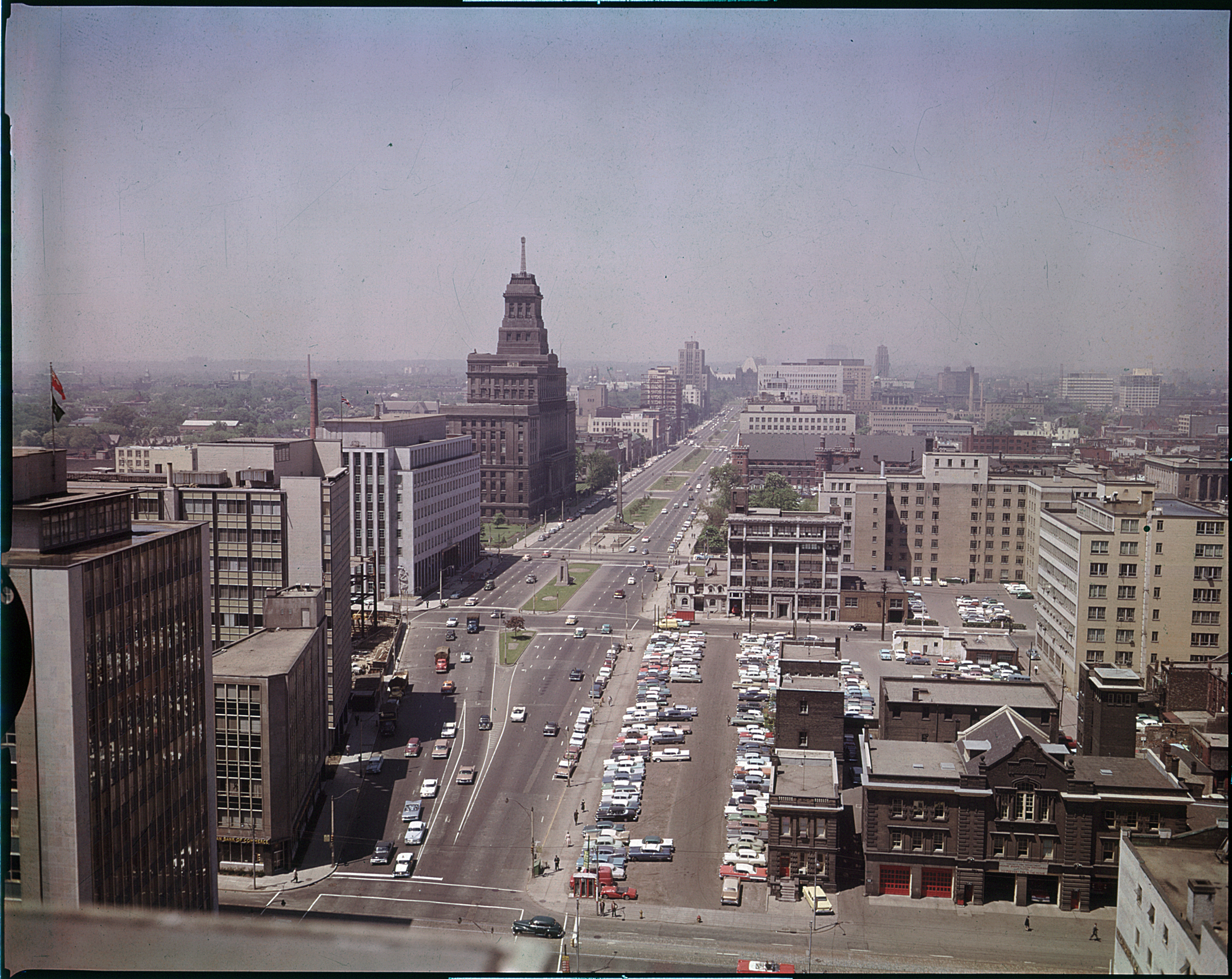
Toronto Fire Department Headquarters and Alarm Office at 152 Adelaide Street West are visible at the bottom right of this photograph taken in 1959

- Toronto Fire Department Headquarters (1909) and Alarm Office at 152 Adelaide Street West (1910) were Beaux-Arts structures and demolished in the 1970s.
- Toronto Fire Station 11 at 170 Rose Avenue at Howard Street 1884, demolished after 1964
- Toronto Fire Station 13 1717 Dundas Street West 1885; demolished after 1972
