= Dick Bourgeois-Doyle =

Canadian writer and science administrator

Richard (Dick) Bourgeois-Doyle (formerly Doyle, born 1952) is a Canadian writer and science administrator whose works have focused on innovation history, research ethics, and gender issues in technology. His books include Her Daughter the Engineer, the first full biography of aeronautical engineer Elsie Gregory MacGill and George J. Klein: The Great Inventor, the official biography of the design engineer dubbed Canada’s most productive inventor in the 20th century. Bourgeois-Doyle was also lead writer and editor of Renaissance II, an account of the Millennium Conferences on Creativity and Innovation.

== Career ==
A three-time winner of the National Research Council Canada (NRC) Outstanding Achievement Award for public awareness of science and former NRC Secretary General, Bourgeois-Doyle chaired the organization’s 100th anniversary: A Century of Innovation in Canada. He has served on a number of national and international bodies dedicated to the promotion of science and innovation. He acted as Chair of the EU Path2Integrity Project from 2019-2022.

His other books celebrating Canadian achievement include Stubborn: Big Ed Caswell and the Line from the Valley to the Northland and What’s So Funny? Lessons from Canada’s Leacock Medal for Humour Writing, the first complete review of winners of the major award for Canadian literary humour. Bourgeois-Doyle is an Honorary Life Member of the Leacock Associates, the organization that awards the medal. Raised in Port Perry, Ontario, Bourgeois-Doyle studied at the University of Guelph, Simon Fraser University, the University of Ottawa, and Athabasca University.
