= British humour =

British humour carries a strong element of satire aimed at the absurdity of everyday life. Common themes include sarcasm, tongue-in-cheek, banter, insults, self-deprecation, taboo subjects, puns, innuendo, wit and the British class system. These are often accompanied by a deadpan delivery which is present throughout the British sense of humour. It may be used to bury emotions in a way that seems unkind in the eyes of other cultures. Jokes are told about everything and almost no subject is off-limits, though a lack of subtlety when discussing controversial issues is sometimes considered insensitive. Many British comedy series have become successful internationally, serving as a representation of British culture to overseas audiences.

== Themes ==
Some themes (with examples) that underpinned late-20th-century British humour were:

=== Innuendo ===
Innuendo in British humour is evident in the literature as far back as Beowulf and Geoffrey Chaucer, and it is a prevalent theme in many British folk songs. William Shakespeare often used innuendo in his comedies, but it is also often found in his other plays. One example in Hamlet act 4 scene v reads:

Young men will do't if they come to't / By Cock, they are to blame.

Restoration comedy is notorious both for its innuendo and for its sexual explicitness, a quality encouraged by Charles II (1660–1685) personally and by the rakish aristocratic ethos of his court.

In the Victorian era, Burlesque theatre combined sexuality and humour in its acts. In the late 19th century, magazines such as Punch began to be widely sold, and innuendo featured in its cartoons and articles.

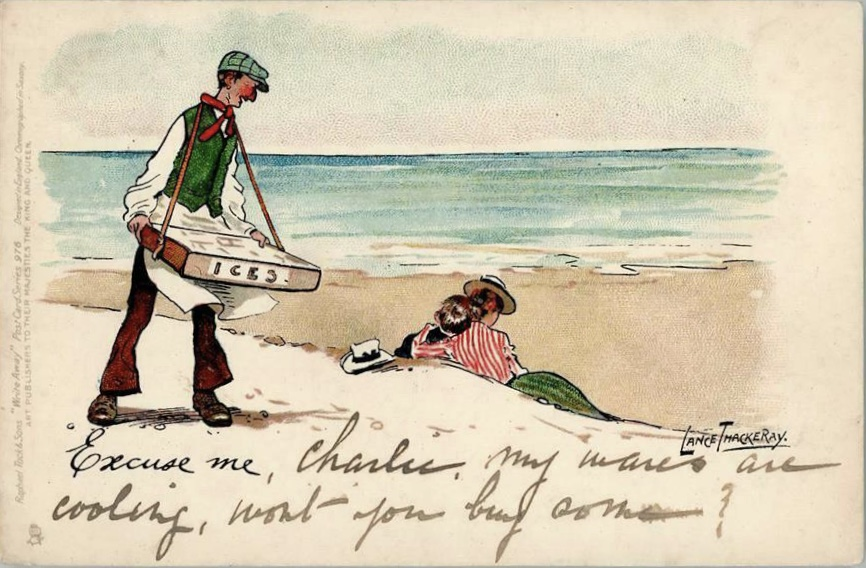
A Lance Thackeray seaside postcard of an ice-cream vendor interrupting a couple on the beach. The printed caption reads "Excuse me", leaving space to add a personal comment.

In the early 1930s, cartoon-style saucy postcards (such as those drawn by Donald McGill) became widespread; at their peak, 16 million saucy postcards were sold per year. They were often bawdy, with innuendo and double entendres, and featured stereotypical characters such as vicars, large ladies and put-upon husbands, in the same vein as the Carry On films. This style of comedy was common in music halls and in the comedy music of George Formby. Many comedians from music hall and wartime gang shows worked in radio after the Second World War, and characters such as Julian and Sandy on Round the Horne used innuendo extensively. Innuendo also features heavily in many British films and television series of the late 20th century. The Carry On series was based largely on smut and innuendo, and many of the sketches of The Two Ronnies are in a similar vein. Innuendo with little subtlety was epitomised by Benny Hill, and the Nudge Nudge sketch by Monty Python openly mocks the absurdity of such innuendo.

By the end of the 20th century, more subtlety in sexual humour became fashionable, as in Not the Nine O'Clock News and Blackadder, while Bottom and Viz continued the smuttier trend. In contemporary British comedy, Julian Clary is an example of a prolific user of innuendo. Innuendo has become a celebrated part of The Great British Bake Off TV cookery programme.

=== Satire ===
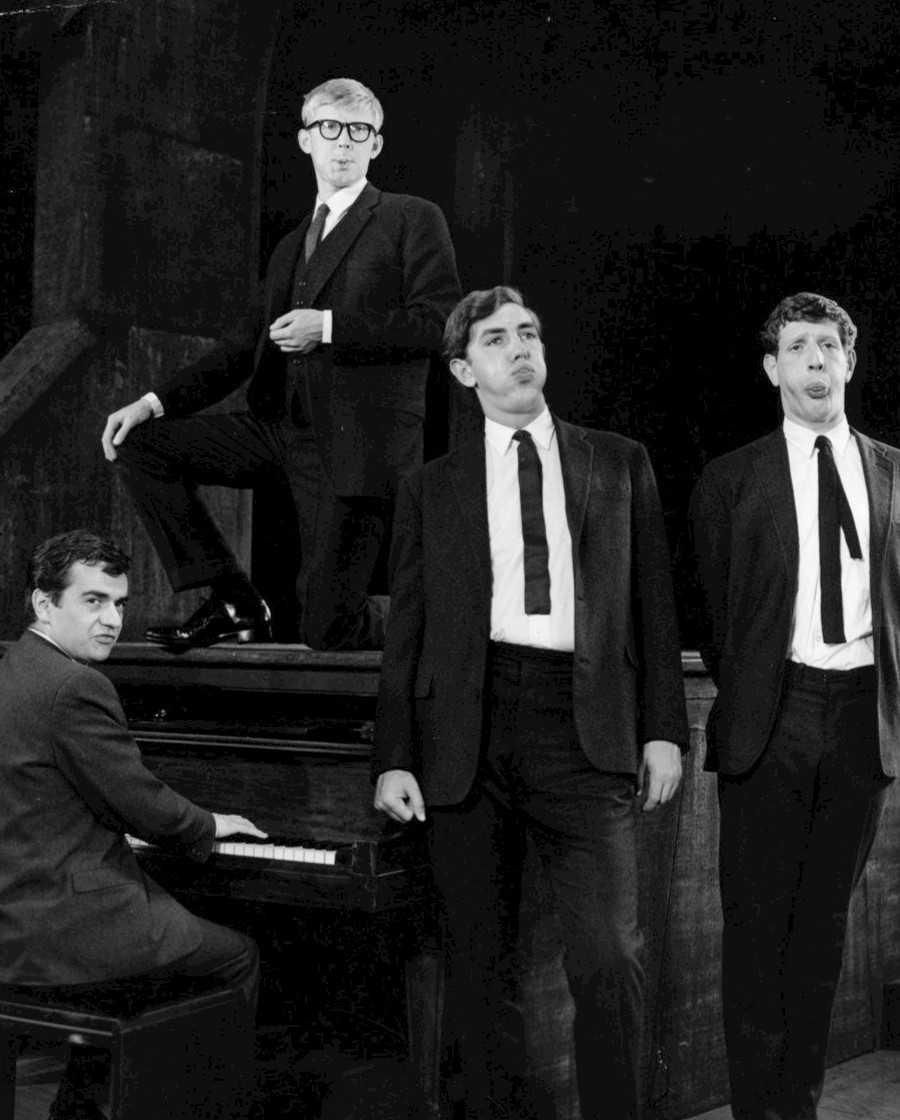
Original cast of Beyond the Fringe, c. 1963

Disrespect to members of the establishment and authority, typified by:

- Beyond the Fringe, stage revue (1960–1966).
- That Was the Week That Was (TW3), late night TV satire on BBC2 (1962–1966).
- Private Eye, satirical magazine (1961–).
- Not the Nine O'Clock News, satirical sketch show, notable for launching the careers of Rowan Atkinson, Griff Rhys Jones, Pamela Stephenson and Mel Smith on BBC2 (1979–1982).
- Yes Minister, political sitcom on BBC2 (1980–1988).
- Spitting Image, TV puppet comedy lampooning the famous and powerful on ITV (1984–1996). Revived on Britbox, (2020-2021).
- Drop the Dead Donkey, Channel 4 sitcom recorded close to transmission that satirised the weekly events (1990–1998).
- Have I Got News for You, a satirical panel game originally on BBC2, now on BBC1 (1990–).
- The Day Today, Nineties TV satire (1994).
- Brass Eye, a controversial alternative prime-time show on Channel 4 (1997–2001).
- The Armando Iannucci Shows, satirical TV show on Channel 4 (2001).
- The Thick of It, satirical political sitcom (2005–2012).
- Mock the Week, a satirical current affairs panel game originally on BBC2 (2005–2022), now on TLC (2026–).
- Time Trumpet, Noughties TV satire (2006).
- The Last Leg, Channel 4 (2012–).
- The Bugle, satirical podcast, initially with Andy Zaltzman and John Oliver (2007–).

=== Absurd ===
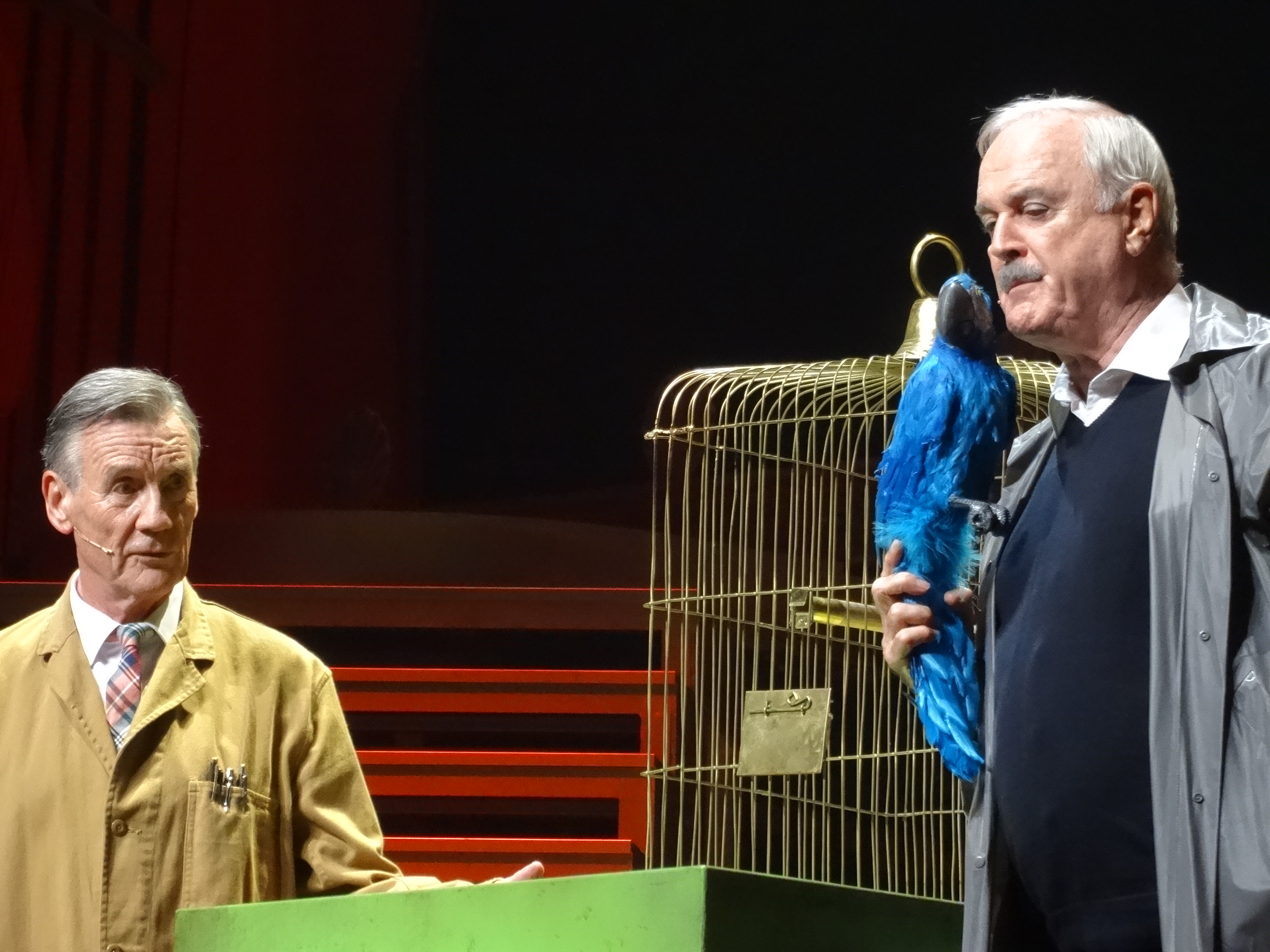
Michael Palin and John Cleese of Monty Python performing the Dead Parrot sketch in 2014

The absurd and the surreal, typified by:

- The Goon Show, surreal radio show on the BBC Home Service (1951–1960).
- Bus Driver's Prayer
- Bonzo Dog Doo Dah Band, musical group playing songs inspired by the music of the 1920s and comic rock songs (1962–).
- The Magic Roundabout, a dub parody of a French children's cartoon that gained a cult following (1964–1971).
- Spike Milligan's Q, sketch show and direct inspiration for Monty Python on BBC2 (1969–1982).
- Monty Python, comedy troupe, originally noted for performing sketches without conclusions (1969–1983).
- I'm Sorry I Haven't a Clue, radio panel game with bizarre games, notably Mornington Crescent and One Song to the Tune of Another on BBC Radio 4 (1974–).
- The Hitchhiker's Guide to the Galaxy, in radio, book, TV series and film form (1978–).
- Count Duckula, cartoon show on ITV (1988–1993).
- Red Dwarf, science fiction sitcom on BBC 2 and Dave (1988–1999, 2009, 2012–)
- Brittas Empire, Chris Barrie sitcom set in a leisure centre about an annoying manager on BBC1 (1991–1997).
- The Smell of Reeves and Mortimer, variety show of sketches and songs in the surrealist genre of comedy on the BBC (1993–1995).
- Shooting Stars, panel game show with seemingly no rules on BBC2 (1993–2011).
- Big Train, sketch show with absurd situations performed in a realistic, deadpan style on BBC2 (1998–2002).
- The Mighty Boosh, comic fantasy containing non-sequiturs and pop-culture references (1998–2009, 2013).
- The League of Gentlemen, sitcom about the eccentric inhabitants of a fictional northern village Royston Vasey, shown on BBC2 (1999–2002, 2017). Also macabre.
- Black Books, sitcom about a bookshop owner, with surreal and nonsensical elements, on Channel 4 (2000–2004).
- The Armando Iannucci Shows, comedy sketch show utilising surrealism (2001).
- Green Wing, experimental sitcom using surrealism, sped-up/slowed-down camera work and ethereal, dream-like sequences on Channel 4 (2004–2007).

=== Macabre ===
Black humour, in which topics and events that are usually treated seriously are treated in a humorous or satirical manner, typified by:

- Nighty Night, a TV series about a sociopathic beauty therapist who fakes her husband's death in order to steal her disabled neighbour's husband
- Jam, an unsettling TV sketch comedy with an ambient music soundtrack
- Garth Marenghi's Darkplace, a horror comedy revolving around the supernatural, and is set in a hospital in the 1980s
- Murder Most Horrid, a TV series in which Dawn French plays murderesses and victims.
- Snuff Box, a sketch show about a hangman (Matt Berry) and his assistant (Rich Fulcher), who make jokes or light-hearted conversation while hanging men.
- Death at a Funeral, a 2007 black comedy film.
- Kind Hearts and Coronets, a film by Ealing Studios about a man murdering his way to a hereditary position, starring Alec Guinness in numerous roles.
- The Ladykillers a 1955 black comedy crime film by Ealing Studios about a gang of criminals who must kill an innocent old lady to escape justice.
- Four Lions, a 2010 film satirising Jihadi terrorists within British Society.
- Inside No. 9, a black comedy, drama anthology series. (2014–2024)

=== Surreal and chaotic ===
- Vic Reeves Big Night Out (1990 and 1991) a parody of the variety shows which dominated the early years of television, but which were, by the early 1990s, falling from grace.
- Bottom (1991–1995) noted for its chaotic humour and highly violent slapstick.
- The Young Ones (1982–1984), a British sitcom about four students living together. It combined traditional sitcom style with violent slapstick, non sequitur plot-turns and surrealism.

=== Humour inherent in everyday life ===
The humour, not necessarily apparent to the participants, inherent in everyday life, as seen in:

- Gavin & Stacey
- The Cockfields
- Benidorm
- Father Ted
- Only Fools and Horses
- Hancock's Half Hour
- Till Death Us Do Part
- Steptoe and Son
- Porridge
- Human Remains
- I'm Alan Partridge
- The Office
- The Royle Family
- Spaced
- Peep Show
- The Fall and Rise of Reginald Perrin
- One Foot in the Grave
- Monkey Dust
- The IT Crowd
- The Inbetweeners
- The Vicar of Dibley
- The Giles cartoons
- Goodness Gracious Me and The Kumars at No 42, TV programme featuring an Indian family, starring Sanjeev Bhaskar and Meera Syal
- Come Dine with Me, reality cookery programme where eccentric cooks and their guests are often mocked by narrator Dave Lamb
- Citizen Khan, a sitcom about a British Asian family in Birmingham
- Uncle, starring the comedian and actor Nick Helm
- Friday Night Dinner, sitcom about a Jewish family celebrating Shabbat
- Michael McIntyre
- Ludwig (2024 TV series)

=== Adults and children ===
William Brown of the "Just William" books, in William Below Stairs

The 'war' between parents/teachers and their children, typified by:

- The Beano and The Dandy, comics of publisher D C Thomson
- Just William, books by Richmal Crompton
- Molesworth books by Geoffrey Willans and illustrated by Ronald Searle
- St Trinian's books and films also originated by Ronald Searle
- Kevin and Perry in Harry Enfield and Chums
- My Family, British TV series
- Outnumbered, British TV series
- The Fast Show, notably Competitive Dad
- Uncle (TV series), starring comedian and actor Nick Helm

=== British class system ===
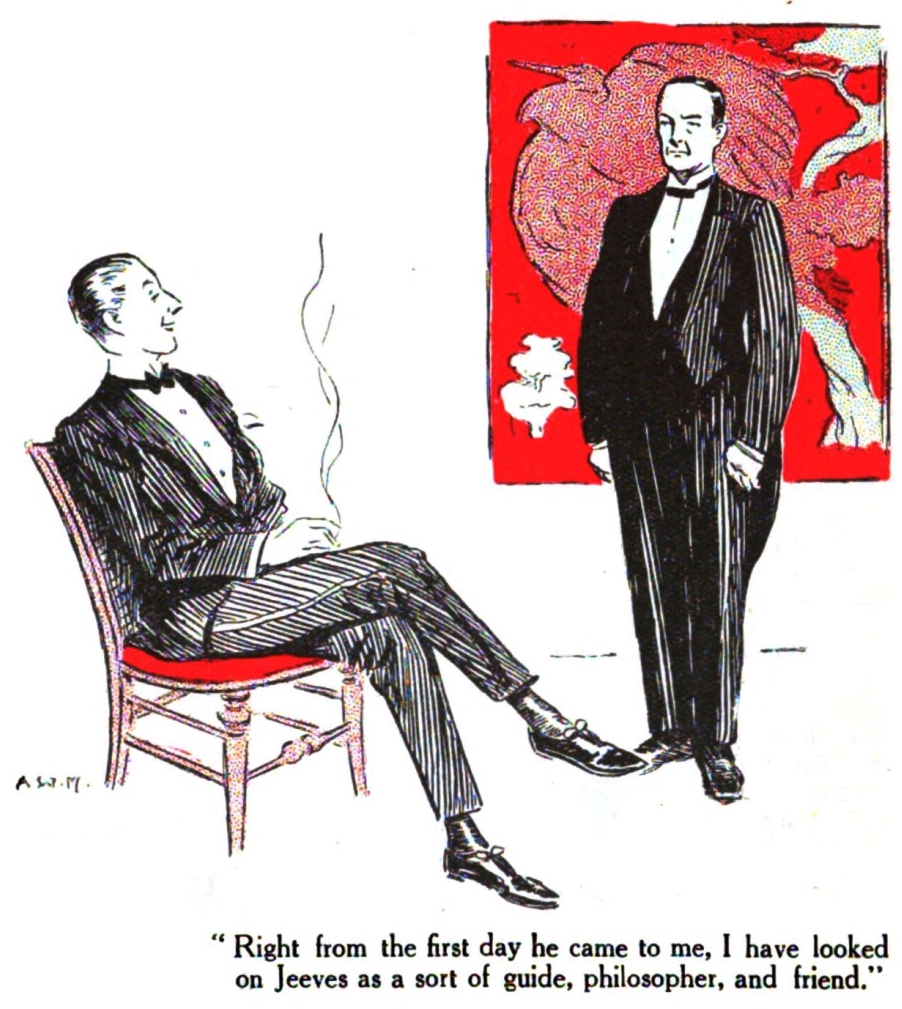
Bertie Wooster and Jeeves in Jeeves in the Springtime

The British class system, especially class tensions between characters; and pompous or dim-witted members of the upper/middle classes or embarrassingly blatant social climbers, typified by:

- The Jeeves books by P. G. Wodehouse
- Dad's Army, comedy TV series
- Rising Damp, comedy TV series
- Fawlty Towers, comedy TV series
- Keeping Up Appearances, comedy TV series
- You Rang, M'Lord?, comedy TV series
- Absolutely Fabulous, comedy TV series
- To the Manor Born, comedy TV series
- Blackadder, comedy TV series
- The New Statesman, political comedy TV series
- Yes Minister, political comedy TV series
- Red Dwarf, science fiction comedy TV series and novels
- The Fast Show, notably Ted & Ralph and The 13th Duke of Wymbourne sketches
- Are You Being Served, department store comedy TV series
- Monty Python's Upper Class Twit of the Year sketch

Also, some comedy series focus on working-class families or groups, such as:

- Two Pints of Lager and a Packet of Crisps, sitcom
- The Royle Family, sitcom
- Early Doors, sitcom
- Monty Python's Four Yorkshiremen and Working-class playwright sketches

=== Lovable rogue ===
The lovable rogue, often from the impoverished working class, trying to 'beat the system' and better himself, typified by:

- Arthur Daley in Minder
- The Andy Capp cartoon strip created by Reginald Smythe
- The Likely Lads, TV series
- Steptoe and Son, sitcom TV series
- Rising Damp, sitcom TV series
- Open All Hours, sitcom TV series
- Only Fools and Horses, comedy TV series (1981–2003) starring David Jason as Del Trotter
- The Flashman Papers, books
- Alan B'stard in The New Statesman, TV series
- Norman Wisdom
- Porridge, sitcom TV series
- Blackadder, comedy TV series
- Red Dwarf, science fiction comedy TV series and novels
- Black Books, sitcom TV series on Channel 4
- The Fast Show, notably Chris the Crafty Cockney sketch
- Spaced
- Billy Connolly, comedian and actor

=== Embarrassment of social ineptitude ===
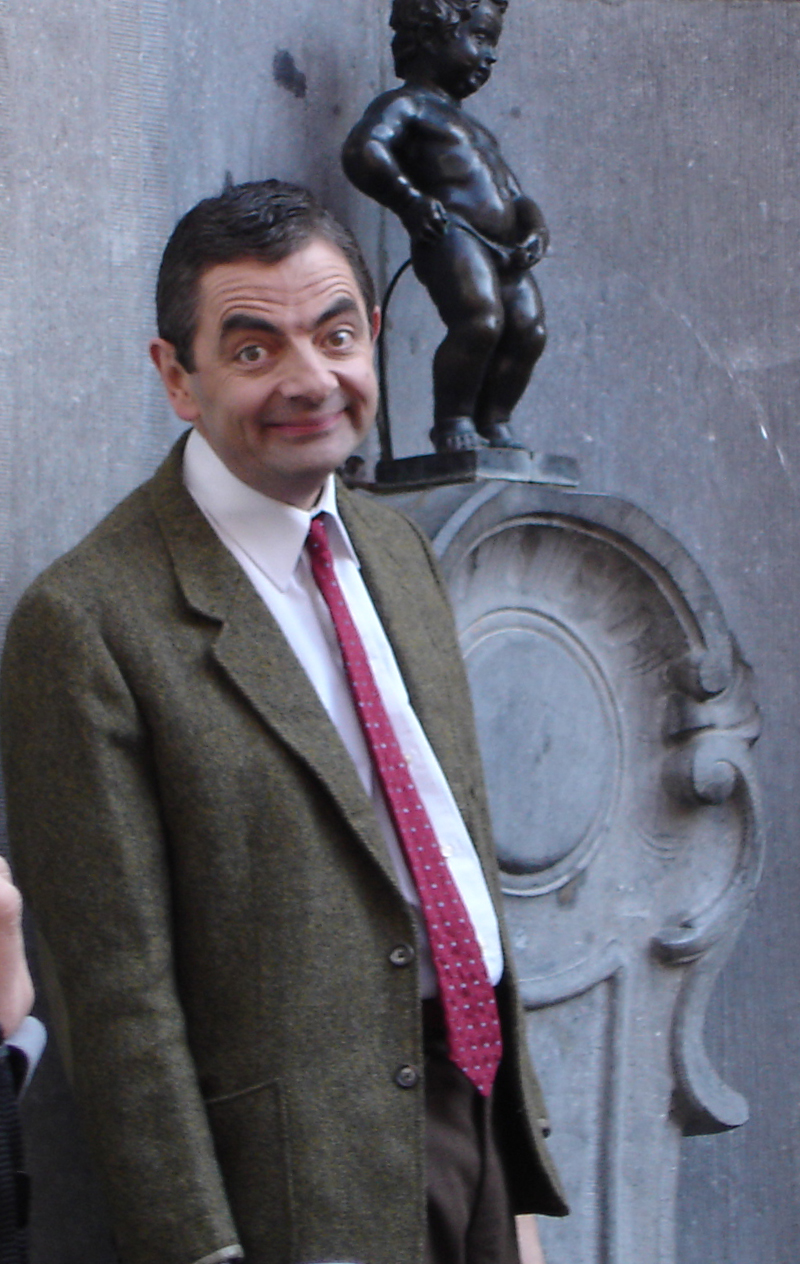
Rowan Atkinson as Mr. Bean

The embarrassment of social ineptitude, typified by:

- Mr. Bean, comedy TV series starring Rowan Atkinson
- The Office, comedy TV series starring Ricky Gervais
- Some Mothers Do 'Ave 'Em, comedy series starring Michael Crawford
- Alan Partridge, comedy TV series starring Steve Coogan
- Da Ali G Show, satirical sketch comedy TV series created by and starring Sacha Baron Cohen as Ali G.
- Count Arthur Strong, radio show
- Extras
- One Foot in the Grave, comedy TV series, 1990 to 2000
- Peep Show, TV series
- Miranda, BBC TV comedy series from 2009, starring Miranda Hart
- The Inbetweeners, Channel 4 comedy series detailing the last years of sixth form for a group of average teenage boys
- Citizen Khan, a sitcom about a British Asian family in Birmingham
- Derek
- Uncle, starring comedian and actor Nick Helm

=== Race and regional stereotypes ===
The An Englishman, an Irishman and a Scotsman joke format is one common to many cultures, and is often used in English, including having the nationalities switched around to take advantage of other stereotypes. These stereotypes are somewhat fond, and these jokes would not be taken as xenophobic (by the Englishman telling them). This sort of affectionate stereotype is also exemplified by 'Allo 'Allo!, a programme that, although set in France in the Second World War, and deliberately performed in over-the-top accents, mocked British stereotypes as well as foreigners. This also applies to a lot of the regional stereotypes in the UK. Regional accent and dialect are used in such programmes as Hancock's Half Hour, Auf Wiedersehen, Pet and Red Dwarf, as these accents provide quick characterisation and social cues.

Although racism was a part of British humour, it is now frowned upon, and acts such as Bernard Manning and Jim Davidson are pilloried. Although some observers once argued certain comedy series of the 1970s were targeting racism rather than being in sympathy with it, such series as Love Thy Neighbour and It Ain't Half Hot Mum are no longer considered acceptable for repeat screenings. Along with the first of these two series, Till Death Us Do Part was an attempt to deal humorously with the influx of immigrants to the United Kingdom, but it is now usually considered to have been counter-productive. Still much admired, however, Fawlty Towers featured the mistreatment of the Spanish waiter, Manuel, but the target was the bigotry of the lead character, Basil Fawlty. The Young Ones featured a police officer (in sunglasses) engaged in racial profiling, only to discover the man was white and wearing dark gloves. Later, The Fast Show has mocked people of other races, such as the Chanel 9 sketches, and Banzai has mimicked Japanese game shows, which have an exaggerated sense of violence, sex and public absurdity. Goodness Gracious Me turned stereotypes on their heads in sketches such as 'Going for an English' and when bargaining over the price of a newspaper. An episode from The Goodies depicted all of the black population of South Africa leaving to escape apartheid, leaving the Afrikaners with nobody to oppress – instead, they begin a system of discrimination based on height, targeting short people, labelled "apart-height".

=== Bullying and harsh sarcasm ===
Harsh sarcasm and bullying, though with the bully usually coming off worse than the victim – typified by:

- On the Buses, Arthur toward his wife, Olive, and Jack and Stan towards their boss Blakey
- Blackadder, Edmund Blackadder towards his sidekick, Baldrick
- The Young Ones, comedy TV series
- Fawlty Towers, Basil Fawlty towards his waiter, Manuel
- The New Statesman, satirising a domineering Conservative member of Parliament
- The Thick of It, satirising the spin culture prevalent in Tony Blair's heyday
- Never Mind the Buzzcocks, satirical music-based panel show
- Mock The Week, satirical news-based panel show
- Black Books, where Bernard Black attacks his assistant, Manny
- Bottom, in which Richie attacks Eddie with little or no provocation, usually resulting in Eddie violently (often near-fatally) retaliating.
- The Ricky Gervais Show, Stephen Merchant and Ricky Gervais mocking Karl Pilkington's unique outlook on life.

=== Parodies of stereotypes ===
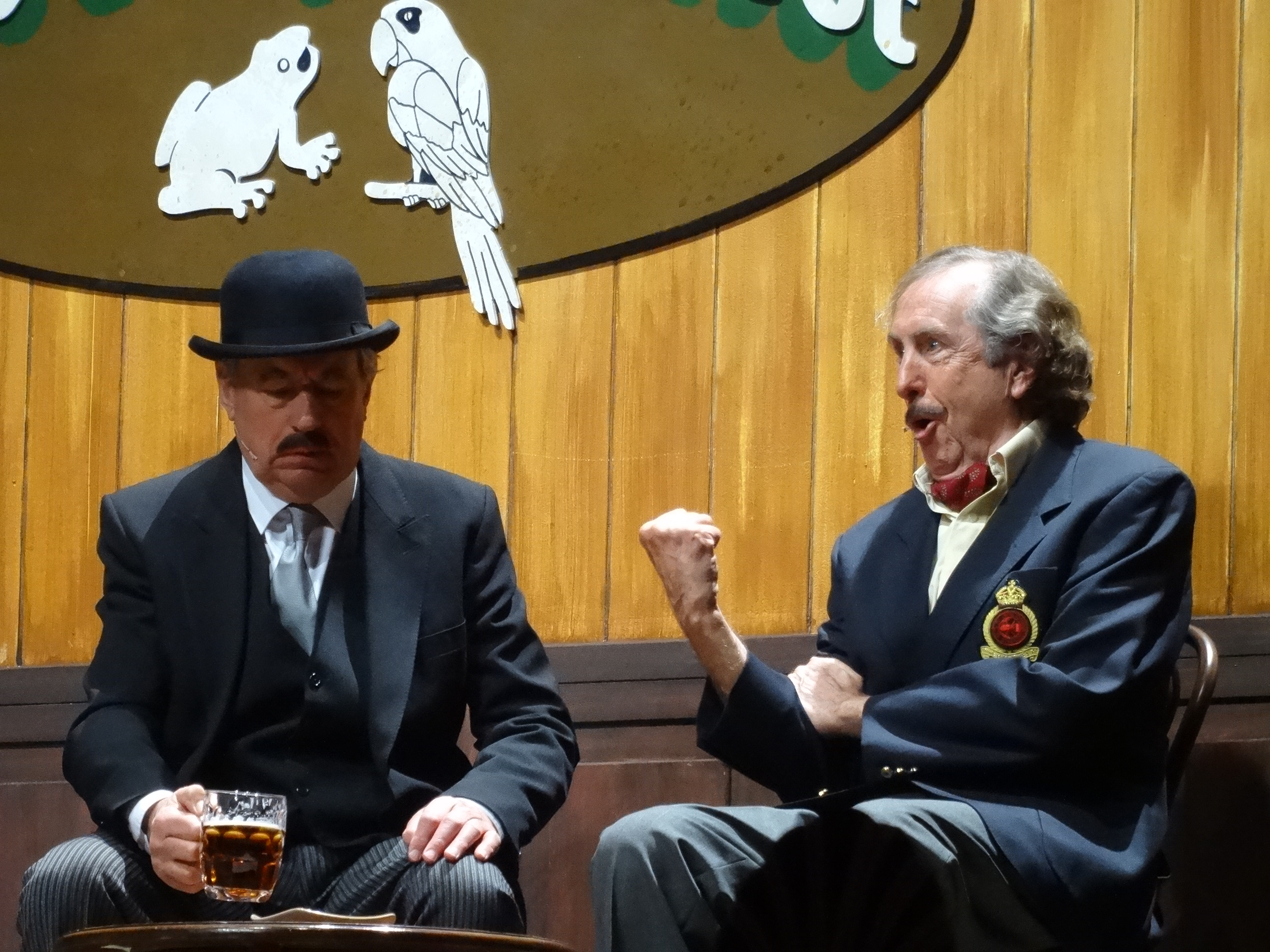
Monty Python's Nudge Nudge sketch performed by Terry Jones and Eric Idle at Monty Python Live (Mostly) in 2014

Making fun of British stereotypes, typified by:

- Beyond the Fringe
- That Was the Week That Was (TW3), late-night TV satire
- Little Britain
- The Fast Show
- The Young Ones
- Harry Enfield's Television Programme
- French and Saunders
- The Day Today
- Brass Eye
- Citizen Smith parodied the disaffected left-wing anarchist
- Mind Your Language, late 1970s sitcom
- Goodness Gracious Me
- Monkey Dust
- Blackadder
- PhoneShop
- Monty Python
- Hale and Pace
- Ali G
- Citizen Khan, a sitcom about a British Asian family in Birmingham.

=== Tolerance of, and affection for, the eccentric ===
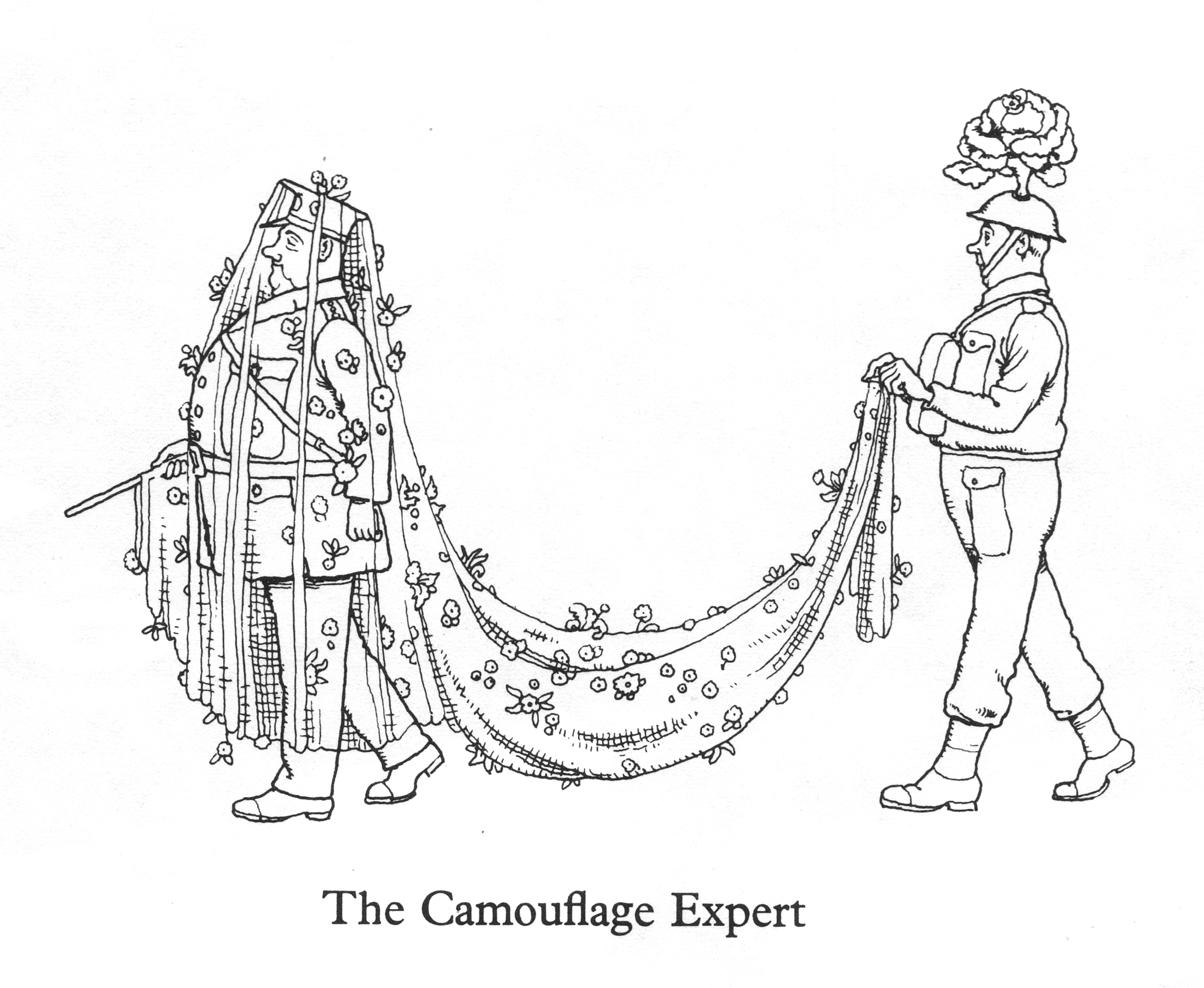
"The Camouflage Expert" by Heath Robinson

Tolerance of, and affection for, the eccentric, especially when allied to inventiveness, typified by:

- Heath Robinson cartoons
- Professor Branestawm books
- Wallace and Gromit animations
- The Fall and Rise of Reginald Perrin, situation comedy starring Leonard Rossiter
- Morecambe and Wise, comedy show starring Eric Morecambe and Ernie Wise
- Last of the Summer Wine, the longest-running TV comedy series in the world (1973–2010)
- A Bit of Fry and Laurie, sketch show written by and starring Stephen Fry and Hugh Laurie noted for its eccentric and inventive use of language
- The Vicar of Dibley, a sitcom in which Dawn French plays a female vicar whose parishioners are archetypically eccentric and mad
- QI or Quite Interesting, a panel game where points are given for being quite interesting and points are taken away for common misconceptions
- The Fast Show, notably Rowley Birkin QC sketch

=== Pranks and practical jokes ===
Usually, for television, the performance of a practical joke on an unsuspecting person whilst being covertly filmed, epitomised by:

- Candid Camera
- Beadle's About
- Game for a Laugh
- Trigger Happy TV
- Balls of Steel
- Prank Patrol

== See also ==
- British comedy and British sitcoms (which blend elements of all of these in varying weaves)
- Comic Relief and Red Nose Day
- History of the British comic
- Understatement
- Irony
- American humor
- Australian humour
- Canadian humour
- Jewish humour
- German humour
- Word play
- Comedy
- An Englishman, an Irishman and a Scotsman
