= American humor =

American humor refers collectively to the conventions and common threads that tie together humor in the United States. It is often defined in comparison to the humor of another country – for example, how it is different from British humor and Canadian humor. It is, however, difficult to say what makes a particular type or subject of humor particularly American. Humor usually concerns aspects of American culture, and depends on the historical and current development of the country's culture. The extent to which an individual will personally find something humorous obviously depends on a host of absolute and relative variables, including, but not limited to geographical location, culture, maturity, level of education, and context. People of different countries will therefore find different situations funny. Just as American culture has many aspects which differ from other nations, these cultural differences may be a barrier to how humor translates to other countries.

== General features ==
=== Themes ===
One leading analysis of American humor, the 1931 book American Humor: A Study of the National Character by Constance Rourke, identified the character of the "Yankee" as that first American comic figure, the first widely accepted American character that the nation could find funny, make fun of and even export for the amusement of the world – a gangly traveler who told stories, played elaborate practical jokes, was ingenuous, sly, perhaps uneducated. She reports that American comedy sprang forth after the American Revolution, when the country was "freed from the worry of self preservation" and its citizens began to regard themselves as "works of art".

=== Types of humor ===
American humor has more observational techniques. However, the style of observational humor (while not exclusively American) is very much a staple of the American style of humor since it seeks to point out the aspects of American culture and social discourse which are obvious while at the same time highlighting their ridiculousness.

=== Sources ===
The United States has many diverse groups from which to draw on for humorous material. The strongest of these influences, during the 20th century at least, has been the influx of Jewish comedians and their corresponding Jewish humor, including some of the most influential: The Three Stooges, The Marx Brothers, Lenny Bruce, Rodney Dangerfield, Jackie Mason, Woody Allen, Mel Brooks, Larry David, Jerry Seinfeld, Jon Stewart, and Lewis Black are a few examples.

In the latter half of the 20th century, comedy from the United States saw its African-American comedians come to the forefront. With exposure stemming from TV shows such as The Jeffersons, Saturday Night Live and The Cosby Show, black comedians became household names. During the eighties and nineties, Eddie Murphy and Bill Cosby were two of the most popular American comedians exported around the globe.

== Literature ==
The earliest example of deliberate, skillful and sustained comedy and satire in American literature is 1637's "New English Canaan" by Thomas Morton of Merrymount, who devoted chapters and poems to his wry observations of Native people and English Puritan colonists alike, including a witty comparison of their cultural values that produced surprising and disturbing answers. A second example is Benjamin Church's "Entertaining Passages from King Philip's War" (1680s editions, Richard Slotkin, ed.), in which a seasoned frontiersman and friend of Native New Englanders observes the foolish tactics and needless tragedies of the conflict.

By the 1830s, regional humor became popular across the US, with examples like Augustus Baldwin Longstreet's Georgia Scenes (1835) from the South and Seba Smith's Major Jack Downing series (1830-1850s) from New England. Smith was influenced by earlier works by John Neal exhibiting Maine and New England accents and cultural references.

Later in the nineteenth century, Ernest Hemingway credited Mark Twain as the 'founding father' of American humor. Twain remained conscious of his humor's relationship with European counterparts, commenting in 1897 that, "The humorous story is American, the comic story is English, the witty story is French. The humorous story depends for its effect upon the manner of the telling; the comic story and the witty story upon the matter."

This early definition emphasizes the performance orientation of American humor, and thereby necessarily the performer her/himself. Indeed, in his time on the lecture circuit Twain essentially 'performed' many of his works, most notably "The American Vandal Abroad" lecture he gave via the Lyceum Movement before the publication of his breakthrough work The Innocents Abroad. Thus, at the root of American humor is the very concept of stand-up comedy itself, and the shift from textual means of conveying humor to that of performance and performer.

His value notwithstanding, Twain represents only one strain of humor in the United States. Another famous American humorist of the 19th century was Ambrose Bierce, whose most famous work is the cynical Devil's Dictionary. Popular humorists who spanned the late 19th and early 20th centuries included Samuel Minturn Peck (1854–1938), who wrote My Sweetheart, and Hayden Carruth (1862–1932), who wrote Uncle Bentley and the Roosters. Early 20th-century American humorists included members of the Algonquin Round Table (named for the Algonquin Hotel), such as Dorothy Parker, SJ Perelman and Robert Benchley. In more recent times popular writers of American humor include P. J. O'Rourke, Louis (L) Harding, Erma Bombeck, and Dave Barry.

There has also been a history of humor in children's books, sometimes with rhyming text. Popular choices include Dr. Seuss and Ogden Nash.

== Cartoons, magazines and animation ==
American cartoons and comics have commented, humorously or scathingly, on American life since Thomas Nast or earlier. Humorous print cartoonists of note include Charles Schulz, Berkeley Breathed, Gary Larson, Walt Kelly, Johnny Hart, Bill Watterson, and others.

U.S. humor magazines of note include Mad, Humbug, Trump and Help!, as well as National Lampoon and Spy magazine.

National Lampoon began in 1970 as an offshoot of the Harvard Lampoon. The magazine regularly skewered popular culture, the counterculture and politics. The magazine was at its height in the 1970s, and its influence spread to films and comedy programs. In the mid-1970s, some of the magazine's contributors left to join the NBC comedy show Saturday Night Live (SNL). The magazine stopped publication in 1998, but films and other programs attributed to "National Lampoon" continue.

In the 20th century, film allowed for animated cartoons of a humorous nature, the most notable of these perhaps being Looney Tunes and Tom and Jerry. Chuck Jones, Tex Avery, Friz Freleng and Mel Blanc (providing voices for many popular characters) were instrumental in these and many other animated shorts' continued popularity. What's Opera, Doc?, Duck Amuck, and One Froggy Evening garnered enough critical appeal to be inducted into the National Film Registry. Warner Brothers' cartoons often dealt with themes beyond US culture or society, but did involve a great deal of commentary on American life. Although many of the American winners of the Academy Award for Animated Short Film are not examples of American humor, a significant percentage would qualify as such. On television, noteworthy American animated series include The Flintstones, The Simpsons, Family Guy, Futurama, Beavis and Butt-head, King of the Hill, Robot Chicken, Ren and Stimpy, SpongeBob SquarePants, South Park, American Dad!, Rick and Morty, and BoJack Horseman.

== Theater and vaudeville ==
A popular form of theater during the 19th century was the minstrelsy show. These shows featured white actors dressed in blackface and playing up racial stereotypes.

Burlesque became a popular form of entertainment in the middle of the 19th century. Originally a form of farce in which females in male roles mocked the politics and culture of the day, burlesque was condemned by opinion makers for its sexuality and outspokenness. The form was hounded off the "legitimate stage" and found itself relegated to saloons and barrooms, and its content mostly raunchy jokes.

Vaudeville is a style of variety entertainment predominant in America in the late 19th century and early 20th century. Developing from many sources including shows in saloons, minstrelsy, British pantomimes, and other popular entertainments, vaudeville became one of the most popular types of entertainment in America. Part of this entertainment was usually one or more comedians. Vaudeville provided generations of American entertainers including George M. Cohan, George Burns and Gracie Allen, Mae West, Fanny Brice, and W.C. Fields, among others. Vaudeville grew less popular as movies replaced live entertainment, but vaudeville performers were able to move into those other fields. Former vaudeville performers who were successful in film, radio and television include Buster Keaton, Marx Brothers, Edgar Bergen, Three Stooges, and Abbott & Costello.

== Radio and recorded ==
Early radio shows include what is labeled as the first situation comedy, Sam and Henry, which debuted on WGN radio in 1926. It was partially inspired by Sidney Smith's popular comic strip The Gumps. Amos & Andy began as one of the first radio comedy serials which debuted on CBS in 1928. This was a show written and performed by white actors about black farmhands moving to the big city. The show was successful enough that in 1930 a film was made with the characters and in 1951 it became a television sitcom. The film starred the white actors in blackface. The television show starred African American actors.

Radio in its early years was a showcase for comedy stars from the vaudeville circuit. Jack Benny was among the early comedy stars in this medium. When Benny moved to television in the 1950s, his time slot was filled by Stan Freberg, a voice actor and comedian. Freberg began in 1950 to produce records of his comedy routines, which involved parodies of popular tunes and spoofs of modern entertainment personalities and political topics. He was also on radio from 1954 to 1957.

Bob Elliott and Ray Goulding were an American comedy team who began in radio in 1946 with a daily 15-minute show titled Matinee With Bob and Ray. Their format was typically to satirize the medium in which they were performing, such as conducting interviews, with off-the-wall dialogue presented in a generally deadpan style as though it were a serious interview. They continued on the air for over four decades on radio and television, ending in 1987.

In more recent times the medium fell out of favor as a source of humor, with Garrison Keillor being perhaps a rare modern example.

As podcasts have seen increasing popularity through the early 21st century, one part-comedic, part-confessional program has seen marked success. Stand-up comedian Marc Maron garnered a considerable following in 2009–10 with his free WTF with Marc Maron podcast, in which he conducts humorous interviews with a range of major and minor figures in the world of comedy, from lesser lights such as the now-deceased Patrice O'Neal, to a more famous crowd, including Robin Williams, Ben Stiller, Amy Poehler, and Judd Apatow. Maron himself prefaces each episode with a summary of his own life and attempts to overcome his neuroses, and despite the potential for seriousness, these challenges are generally presented in a comedic, if not exasperated light.

== Film ==
The very first movie to be produced was Thomas Edison's kinetoscope of his assistant Fred Ott in Record of a Sneeze. This could also be considered the first to show a comedic element.

During the era of silent films in the 1920s, comedic films began to appear in significant numbers. These were mainly focused on visual humor, including slapstick and burlesque. In America, prominent clown-style actors of the silent era include Charlie Chaplin (although he was born in England), Buster Keaton and Harold Lloyd. Oliver Hardy (of Laurel and Hardy) (Stan Laurel being British), Fatty Arbuckle, the Marx Brothers and other names were significant in the first decades of American cinema humor.

Many early film directors in the US were born elsewhere. This is true of one of the most noted early comedy directors in Hollywood, Billy Wilder. However, American-born directors like Howard Hawks, Preston Sturges and George Cukor also were major film comedy directors in the 1940s. In the 1960s to 1970s Woody Allen and Mel Brooks gained note, becoming two of the most appreciated of American film comedy directors. In the 1980s Christopher Guest, Carl Reiner, and the Coen brothers emerged as significant directors or writers in American film comedy. Added to this, several "brother duos" have been of significance in American film, such as The Zucker brothers, the Coen brothers, and The Farrelly brothers. In the last ten years Kevin Smith, Jay Roach, Tom Shadyac, and Alexander Payne have garnered notice as film directors whose work is often humorous, if at times darkly so in the case of Payne. Some of the aforementioned directors, particularly Woody Allen and the Coen brothers, also do other genres of film besides comedy. In the modern era, Adam Sandler, Ben Stiller, Seth Rogen, and Will Ferrell have been popular proponents of American film comedy.

== Television ==
=== Sitcoms ===
The situation comedy (sitcom) is a format that first developed in radio and later became the primary form of comedy on television. The first sitcom to be number one in US ratings overall was I Love Lucy. A typical I Love Lucy episode involved one of Lucy's ambitious but hare-brained schemes, whether it be sneaking into Ricky's nightclub act, finding a way to hobnob with celebrities, showing up her fellow women's club members, or simply trying to improve the quality of her life. Usually she ends up in some comedic mess, a form of slapstick comedy. The I Love Lucy show grew out of a radio program in which Lucille Ball was featured. Another popular sitcom of the 1950s to cross over from radio was Amos & Andy.

In the decades since, several sitcoms have been tops in the ratings. In the 1960s The Beverly Hillbillies and The Andy Griffith Show held that distinction. Both of these programs were based on the country bumpkin – the Clampetts bringing their hillbilly ways to Beverly Hills, and Griffith as a slow-talking sheriff in a small rural town. In the 1970s All in the Family was the top-rated show. While dealing with serious issues, it was based on the loudmouth bigot usually getting his comeuppance.

The most successful sitcoms of the 1980s were Roseanne and Cheers. Roseanne was a family sitcom, based on loud and large blue-collar parents. Cheers, on the other hand, was about a neighborhood bar frequented by a mix of working-class and professional drinkers.

In the 1990s the increasing popularity of cable changed audience tastes in sitcoms. Cable provided more viewing options and made it more difficult for any one show to dominate in the manner that The Cosby Show or Cheers did in their eras. However, Seinfeld and Friends managed to be among the most-watched shows of the decade. The 2000s has seen a further erosion in the sitcom, with Friends being the only one to be the top-watched show in any year of this decade, thus far, and the cancellation of the Emmy-winning Arrested Development. Arrested Development had been one of the few critically successful comedies to have started in the 2000s, but recent comedies such as The Office, 30 Rock and My Name Is Earl have garnered some praise.

While many sitcoms were based on families or family situations, another common thread in sitcoms is "workplace comedies." The Andy Griffith Show and Arrested Development had elements of both workplace and family comedy. For more on this see US sitcom.

Although the sitcom is often derided by critics, a few sitcoms have managed to be successful with both critics and audiences alike. Among these are Frasier, Seinfeld, All in the Family, and The Mary Tyler Moore Show.

The television sitcom provides an opportunity to compare British and American humor. Many British sitcoms have been remade for American audiences. For example, Till Death Us Do Part became All in the Family; Man About the House became Three's Company; and, the immensely popular Steptoe and Son became Sanford and Son. The Office was originally a British sitcom that has been successfully remade for an American audience using the same title (and in the case of the pilot episode, the same script). However, most British sitcoms usually fare better in their original forms. Remakes of other British comedies have failed.

=== Sketch comedy and variety shows ===
A variety show is a show with a variety of acts, often including music and comedy skits, especially on television. The first successful comedy-variety show might be Milton Berle's, followed by Ernie Kovacs and Sid Caesar. Jack Benny moved to television in the mid-1950s. Variety shows also featured Jackie Gleason, Bob Hope and Dean Martin mixing stand-up comedy, sketches and musical numbers for true variety. Later successes include The Carol Burnett Show and Rowan & Martin's Laugh-In.

Saturday Night Live (SNL) first aired on October 11, 1975, with George Carlin as its host. It was created by Canadian Lorne Michaels. The original concept was for a comedy-variety show featuring young comedians, live musical performances, and short films. Rather than have one permanent host there was a different guest host each week. The first cast members were The Second City alumni Dan Aykroyd, John Belushi, and Gilda Radner and National Lampoon Lemmings alumnus Chevy Chase (whose trademark became his usual falls and opening spiel that ushered in the show's opening), Jane Curtin, Laraine Newman, and Garrett Morris. The original head writer was Michael O'Donoghue, a writer at National Lampoon who had worked alongside several cast members while directing The National Lampoon Radio Hour. The cast has periodically changed over the years, serving as a springboard for many of its performers to success in other television programs or films. SNL continues to air weekly.

In the early 1990s there started to be more sketch comedy shows that concerned racial issues or intentionally had a diverse cast. An early example of this was In Living Color, initially produced by Keenen Ivory Wayans. Despite the original cast being majority African American, the show is most remembered for introducing the Caucasian Jim Carrey and Puerto Rican Jennifer Lopez to a wider audience. In the 2000s Chappelle's Show began and became a popular, if controversial, variety series. It became noted for dealing with issues like racism, sexual perversity, and drug use.

Currently The Daily Show and Saturday Night Live are leading comedy-variety shows.

== Stand-up ==
American stand-up comedians deal with a variety of forms and issues. Among forms popular or popularized in the US are observational comedy, about everyday life, and Improvisational comedy. Modern improvisational comedy in general is largely linked to Chicago and especially The Second City troupe. The 1950s saw the rise of this troupe's significance in modern improvisational comedy.

That decade also witnessed a rise in stand-up comedy dealing with more provocative or politically charged subject matter. Among the best-known comedians from the 1950s to the 1980s to work in this fashion are Lenny Bruce, Richard Pryor, George Carlin, Bill Hicks, and Sam Kinison. They dealt with subjects such as race, religion, and sex in a manner that was generally not allowed on television or film. The Richard Pryor Show ended after four episodes due in part to controversy, although poor ratings were a strong factor. In other cases the reactions were more severe, as both Lenny Bruce and George Carlin were arrested on obscenity charges.

However, other stand-ups in the US choose an opposite approach that involves avoiding angering or offending elements of the audience. They may also try to work "clean" either because they prefer doing so or because they wish to reach audiences that disdain raunchy material. Among those who do so as a preference are Brian Regan, Bob Newhart, and Bill Cosby. Ray Romano is capable of or even willing to work "blue," as demonstrated on Dr. Katz, Professional Therapist DVD commentary tracks, but has tended to avoid doing so out of deference to his current audience.

== Notable names ==
- Allan Burns - Three Emmys for Comedy writing.
- Art Buchwald - Pulitzer Prize winning humorist.
- Art Carney - Lifetime Achievement from the American Comedy Awards.
- Bea Arthur - Two Emmy Awards and a Tony Award
- Bernie Mac - Number 72 on 100 Greatest Stand-ups of All Time.
- Betty White - Lifetime Achievement from the American Comedy Awards.
- Bill Burr
- Bill Hicks - Number 19 on 100 greatest Stand-ups of All Time.
- Bill Maher - Number 38 on 100 Greatest Stand-ups of All Time.
- Carl Reiner - Mark Twain Prize for American Humor
- Carol Burnett - Six Emmy Awards, Two Golden Globe Awards and a Presidential Medal of Freedom
- Chris Rock - Number five on Comedy Central's100 Greatest Stand-ups of All Time.
- Christopher Buckley - Thurber Prize for American Humor.
- Conan O'Brien - 2025 Mark Twain Prize for American Humor
- Dave Chappelle - Number 43 on 100 Greatest Stand-ups of All Time.
- David Cross - Number 85 on 100 Greatest Stand-ups of All Time.
- David Javerbaum - Eight Emmys, two Peabody Awards, and only two-time winner of Thurber Prize for American Humor.
- David Ross Locke - 19th-century humorist with the pen name Petroleum V. Nasby and was a favorite of President Lincoln.
- David Sedaris - Thurber Prize for American Humor.
- Debbie Reynolds - Lifetime Achievement from the American Comedy Awards
- Denis Leary - Number 50 on 100 Greatest Stand-ups of All Time.
- Dennis Miller - Number 21 on 100 Greatest Stand-ups of All Time.
- Diane English - One of the few women to win an unshared Emmy for comedy writing.
- Don Rickles - Number 17 on 100 Greatest Stand-ups of All Time.
- Doug Stanhope
- Eddie Murphy - Number 10 on 100 Greatest Stand-ups of All Time.
- George Burns - Lifetime Achievement from the American Comedy Awards.
- George Carlin - Number 2 on 100 Greatest Stand-ups of All Time.
- Henry Wheeler Shaw, aka Josh Billings. American humorist and author.
- Ian Frazier - Thurber Prize for American Humor.
- Imogene Coca - Lifetime Achievement from the American Comedy Awards.
- James L. Brooks - Academy Award nominee for several comedy films and won two Emmies for comedy writing. (also did dramas)
- Jerry Lewis - Lifetime Achievement from the American Comedy Awards.
- Jerry Seinfeld - Number 12 on 100 Greatest Stand-ups of All Time.
- Joan Rivers - long-term national and international career in stand-up.
- Johnny Carson - Lifetime Achievement from the American Comedy Awards.
- Jonathan Winters - Lifetime Achievement from the American Comedy Awards and 2000 Mark Twain Prize for American Humor.
- Jon Stewart - Number 41 on 100 Greatest Stand-ups of All Time.
- Lenny Bruce - Number 3 on 100 Greatest Stand-ups of All Time.
- Lewis Black - Number 51 on 100 Greatest Stand-ups of All Time.
- Lily Tomlin - Lifetime Achievement from the American Comedy Awards and 2003 Mark Twain Prize for American Humor.
- Lorne Michaels - 2004 Mark Twain Prize for American Humor
- Louis C.K.- Number 98 on 100 Greatest Stand-ups of All Time.
- Lucille Ball – Four-time Emmy winner and winner of a Lifetime Achievement Award from the Kennedy Center Honors
- Mark Twain - 19th century humorist.
- Martin Lawrence - Number 37 on 100 Greatest Stand-ups of All Time.
- Mary Tyler Moore - Six Emmy Awards, Three Golden Globe Awards, and a Lifetime Achievement Award from the American Comedy Awards
- Mel Brooks - Writer of movies/musicals and a former writer of the Sid Caesar Show.
- Mitch Hedberg - Stoner and drug user, the national award winner for best comedian of the post-modern age
- Neil Simon - 2006 Mark Twain Prize for American Humor
- Norman Lear - Television Hall of Fame, mostly wrote and produced for comedies.
- Paul Mooney
- Penny Marshall - Director of a comedy film in the top 50 of AFI's 100 Years... 100 Laughs and comedic actress.
- Phyllis Diller - Lifetime Achievement from the American Comedy Awards.
- Redd Foxx - Number 24 on 100 Greatest Stand-ups of All Time.
- Red Skelton - Lifetime Achievement from the American Comedy Awards.
- Richard Lewis - Number 45 on 100 Greatest Stand-ups of All Time.
- Richard Pryor - Number 1 on 100 Greatest Stand-ups of All Time.
- Robert Klein - Number 22 on 100 Greatest Stand-ups of All Time.
- Robin Williams - Number 13 on 100 Greatest Stand-ups of All Time and won a Grammy Award for Best Spoken Comedy Album.
- Rodney Dangerfield - Number 7 on 100 Greatest Stand-ups of All Time.
- Sid Caesar - Early television comedy pioneer. His staff included Mel Brooks, Woody Allen, Neil Simon and Carl Reiner
- Steve Allen - Lifetime Achievement from the American Comedy Awards.
- Steve Martin - Lifetime Achievement from the American Comedy Awards and 2005 Mark Twain Prize for American Humor
- Steven Wright - Number 23 on 100 Greatest Stand-ups of All Time.
- Tina Fey - First female head writer for Saturday Night Live and 2010 Mark Twain Prize for American Humor.
- Walter Matthau - Lifetime Achievement from the American Comedy Awards
- Whoopi Goldberg - 2001 Mark Twain Prize for American Humor.
- "Weird Al" Yankovic - Multiple winner of the Grammy Award for Best Comedy Album.

Note: An attempt has been made to avoid repeating names already mentioned, but some repetition might still exist. This list is partial and mostly deals with American comedians or humorists who won Lifetime Achievement awards in their fields or were placed in lists of history's great comedians.

== See also ==
- List of comedians
- Mark Twain Prize for American Humor
- American Comedy Awards
- Stand-up comedy
- Canadian humor
- British humor
- Australian humor
- America Against the World
