= Arcadian Adventures with the Idle Rich =

1914 collection of vignettes by Stephen Leacock

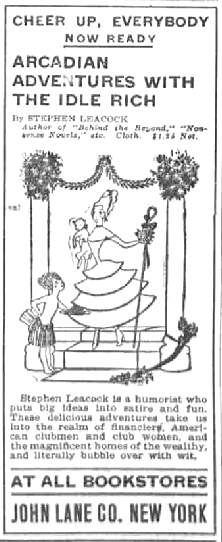
Arcadian Adventures with the Idle Rich being advertised in an American newspaper.

Arcadian Adventures with the Idle Rich is a collection of humorous interwoven vignettes by Stephen Leacock, published in 1914. It exists as a companion work to his Sunshine Sketches of a Little Town (1912), due to the similarity of composition, and their subject matter. Arcadian Adventures follows the members of the 'Mausoleum Club' on Plutoria Avenue, in an unnamed American city (usually referred to as Plutoria, after its main street), and pokes fun at their obsessive individualism and materialism. As Leacock thought humour to be 'the kindly contemplation of the incongruities of life and the artistic expression thereof', Acardian Adventures tends to steer slightly away from this form of 'kindliness', and, thus, ranks as one of his most scathing works, as well as arguably one of his funniest.

At the time of publication, Arcadian Adventures became extremely popular in North America, and, for a while, was considered a greater success than Sunshine Sketches.

It is believed that the book was translated and published by the Bolshevik government soon after the 1917 revolution, and it became a bestseller in the Soviet Union. While Leacock biographer Carl Spadoni has yet to find definitive evidence that a Russian edition exists, a communist-approved translation was printed in the German Democratic Republic in 1955.

== Stories ==
1. A Little Dinner with Mr. Lucullus Fyshe
2. The Wizard of Finance
3. The Arrested Philanthropy of Mr. Tomlinson
4. The Yahi-Bahi Oriental Society of Mrs. Rasselyer-Brown
5. The Love Story of Mr. Peter Spillikins
6. The Rival Churches of St. Asaph and St. Osoph
7. The Ministrations of the Rev. Uttermust Dumfarthing
8. The Great Fight for Clean Government

== Characters ==
- Mr. Lucullus Fyshe
- Rev. Edward Fareforth Furlong, the Reverend for St. Astaph's
- Miss Phillpa Furlong
- Juliana Furlong, the sister to Rev. Furlong
- The Duke of Dulham
- Mr. Asmodeus Boulder
- Dr. Boomer, the President of Plutoria University
- Mr. Tomlinson, the Wizard of Finance
- Mrs. Tomlinson
- Fred Tomlinson
- Dr. Boyster
- Mr. Skinyer, a lawyer for Skinyer-Beatem
- Mr. Rasselyer-Brown
- Mrs. Rasselyer-Brown
- Miss Dulphemia Rasselter-Brown
- Mr. Yahi-Bahi, a character who caricatures the religious leader 'Abdu'l-Bahá, who visited Leacock's resident city of Montreal in 1912.
- Mr. Sikleigh Snoop, the sex-poet
- Mr. Ram Spudd
- Mrs. Buncomhearst
- Miss Snagg
- Mr. Peter Spillikins
- Mrs. Everleigh-Spillikins
- Mr. Edward Ruff
- Mr. Newberry
- Mrs. Margaret Newberry
- Dr. Slyder
- The Little Girl in Green
- Rev. Dr. McTeague, minister at St. Ostoph's, and professor at Plutoria University
- Mr. Dick Overend
- Rev. Dr. Uttermost Dumfarthing
- Catherine Dumfarthing

== Relation to Sunshine Sketches ==
Leacock believed in the nobility of his fellow man while remaining sensitive to his fallibility, to his need to be reminded of his social responsibilities.

— Gerald Lynch, Afterword, Acardian Adventures

While Arcadian Adventures takes place in an anonymous American city, and focuses upon the wealthy of that metropolis, Sunshine Sketches revolves around a small Canadian town, the fictional Mariposa, and her inhabitants. Indeed, where Arcadian Adventures begins at the 'Mausoleum Club', Sunshine Sketches concludes in one. Arcadian Adventures has been likened to "a satire of the rich, set in a fictionalized Chicago", but actually based in Montreal.

In many ways, the works should be read in tandem, as Sunshine Sketches exemplifies Leacock's ideal community, from the perspective of a traditional Tory, and Arcadian Adventures the vision to be avoided. He ultimately sought "a middle way between socialism and liberalism".

== Influences ==
Leacock, as an economist, had studied under Thorstein Veblen at the University of Chicago, and his The Theory of the Leisure Class permeates the book with influence. It has been argued that Alexis de Tocqueville's Democracy in America had also influenced the book. Given that Leacock was well-read in John Stuart Mill, there has also been the suggestion that Mill's Chapters on Socialism had some influence on the book.

== Reviews ==
Per the Chicago Evening Post: "Crisp conversation and paragraphs jammed with American sarcasm of the gilt-edged variety characterize this latest effort of a really humorous humorist. Mr. Leacock penetrates upper-class sham and satirizes it cheerfully. This is almost certain to generate little chuckles and long smiles for the intelligent proletarian who treats himself to these 'adventures.'"

== See also ==
- Canadian humour
