= Alumnae Theatre =

Theater in downtown Toronto

Alumnae Theatre Company
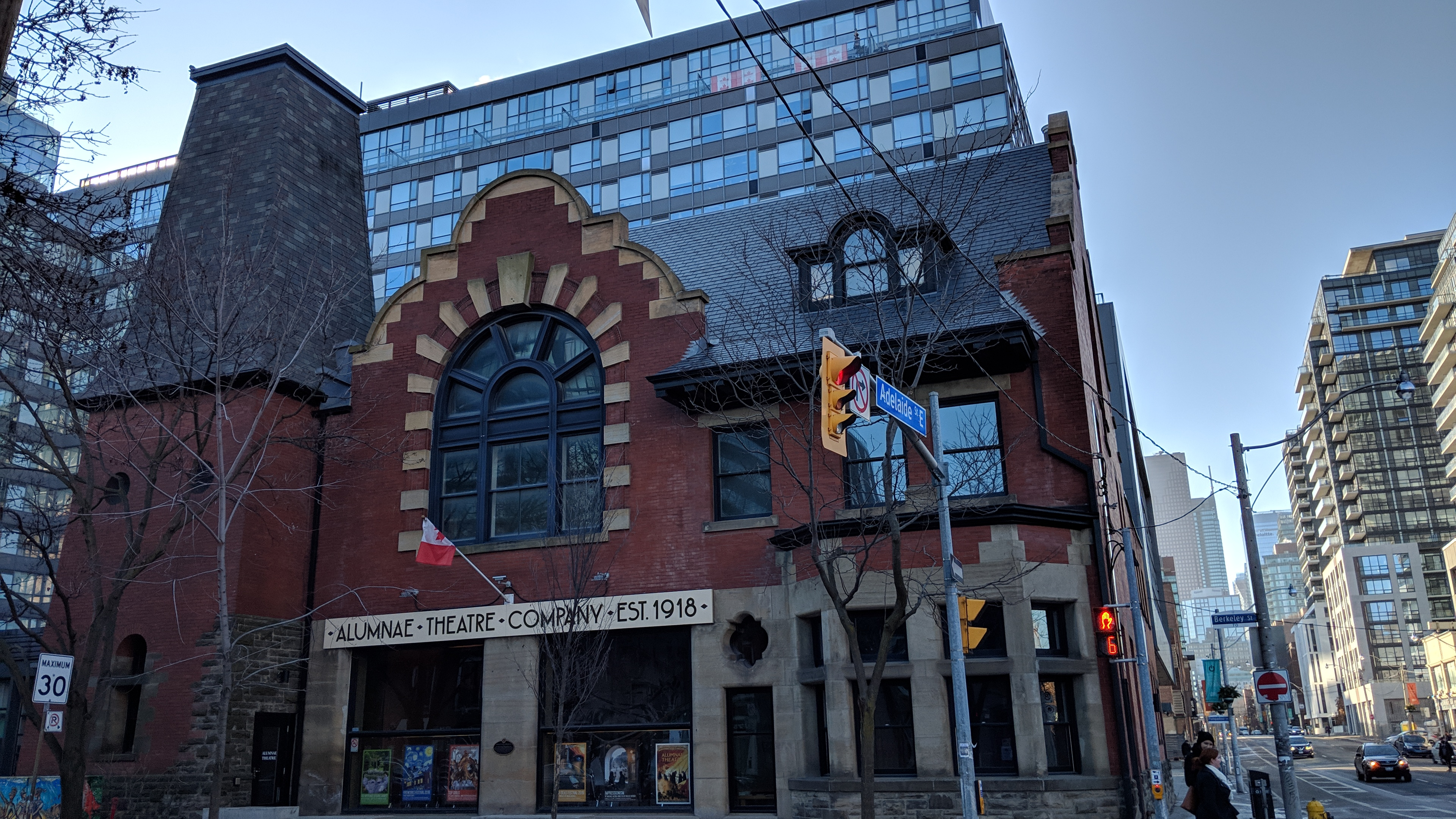
- The current home of the Alumnae Theatre
- Formation: 1918
- Type: Theatre group
- Location: 70 Berkeley Street Toronto, Ontario
- Coordinates: 43°39′10″N 79°21′54″W
- Artistic director: Lori Delorme
- Website: alumnaetheatre.com

The Alumnae Theatre, known most often as The Alum, is the oldest theatre society in Toronto, Ontario, Canada still in operation. It was founded in 1918 by female graduates of the University of Toronto who wanted to continue to participate in semi-professional theatre after graduation. Originally all performers in all roles were female, but in the 1920s the society began to invite male guest performers to join the performances. Still today the leadership of the society remains entirely female.

Its mission has always been to produce the great plays of the western canon, while also sometimes doing more modern works, such as the Toronto premier of one of Carol Shields' works. The society originally performed at the university's Hart House Theatre. In 1957 the society renovated an old coach house, and opened the Coach House Theatre. In 1962 the theatre moved again into a former synagogue on Cecil and Huron streets. In 1970 they were evicted from this location when the site was expropriated by Ontario Hydro. After a brief hiatus, the company found a permanent home in an old fire hall at Adelaide and Berkeley streets in 1972. Originally named Firehall No. 4, the building is one of Toronto's historic fire stations. It was first built in 1905 and was considerably renovated by architect Ron Thom, whose wife Molly was a longtime member of Alumnae Theatre. The firehall had been slated by city council for demolition, until the theatre company intervened and with the help of John Sewell convinced the city to have it saved and restored for their purposes. The building now contains a main performance space on the ground level, which seats 140. There is a smaller studio venue upstairs on the third floor.

Alumnae Theatre and the Alumnae Theatre Company are home to an annual New Ideas Festival. Entering its 35th year, the New Ideas Festival - or NIF - is an annual juried festival of new writing, works-in-progress and experimental theatre, with a different program of plays each week. NIF has a long history of creating space for young and emerging Canadian theatre artists, including playwrights, directors, actors, stage managers, designers and more. NIF typically happens at the end of March and will feature 2 or 3 weeks of new works presented in Alumnae Theatre's studio theatre space located on the 3rd floor of the theatre.
