= 39 Commissioner Street =

Building in Toronto, Canada

Coordinates: 43.6461°N 79.3501°W

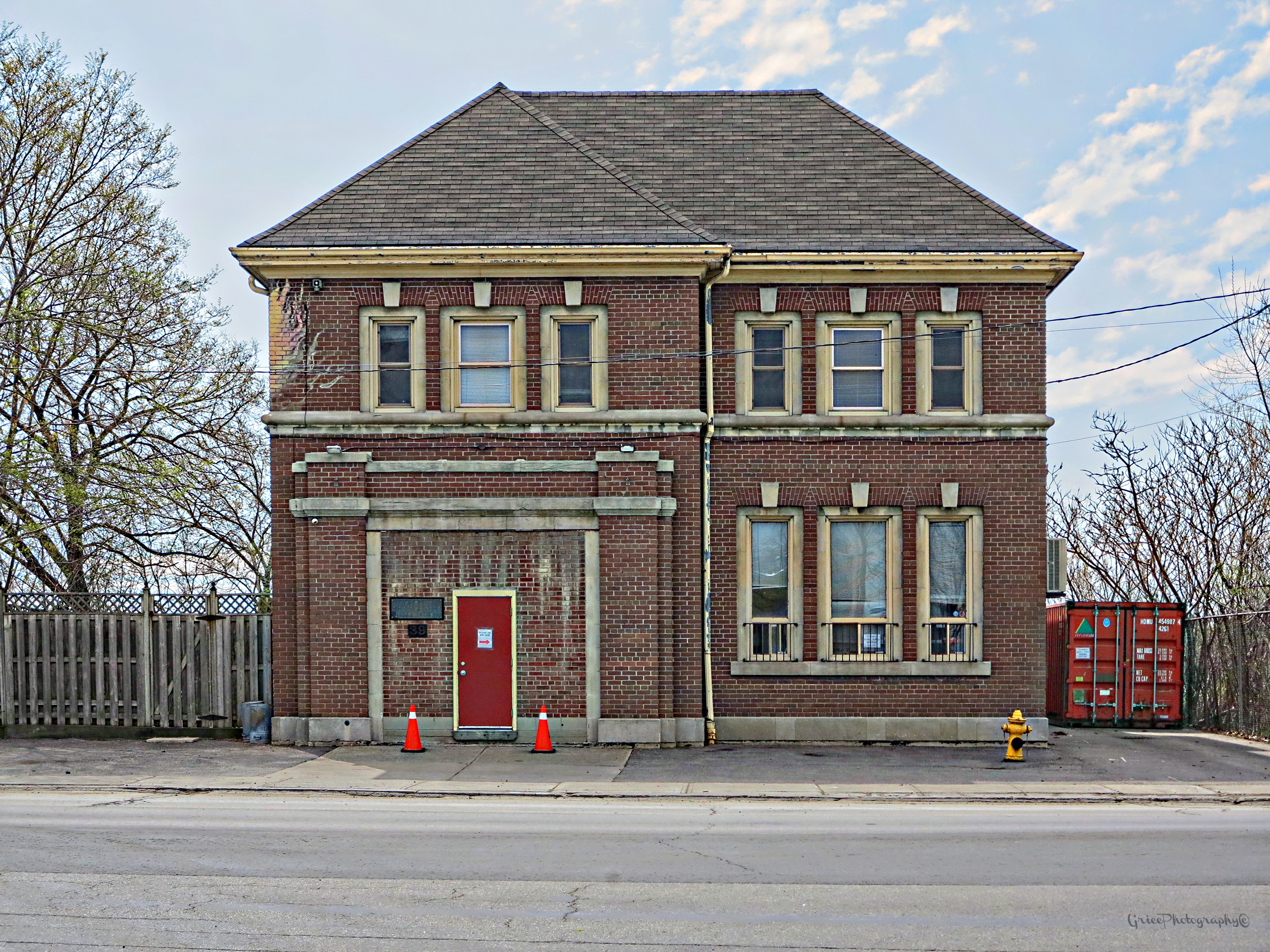
39 Commissioner Street in 2016

The Toronto Harbour Commission built a firehall at 39 Commissioner Street to help attract industrial enterprises to the newly reclaimed Toronto Port Lands in 1928. It was integrated into Toronto's Fire Services as Station 30. It was sold to the Toronto Firefighter's Association. The Association moved, and sold the building in 2015.

The building is on the city's list of heritage structures.

By the 2010s industrial enterprises had largely moved from the Port Lands, which were often described as the largest parcel of underdeveloped downtown real estate in North America. A plan was developed, and approved, to redevelop the northwest corner of the parcel, building offices and residential buildings on a new artificial island carved out of the existing land.

The new island, Ookwemin Minising, is being raised an additional 2 meters, through landfill, to reduce vulnerability to the rare 100-year or 1000-year flood. However special steps were to be taken to preserve building with inherent cultural heritage. The fire hall is to be moved 23.7 metres (78 ft) south, and raised 1.7 metres (5.6 ft).

The building was designed by J.J. Woolnough in the Edwardian Classicism style.

In May 2016 Derek Flack, writing in Blog TO, characterized the building as the coolest lease then available in Toronto.

In 2019 the building's tenant was a dog-walking agency. The city had been in negotiations with the tenant, and the landlord, to buy the building. But when delays in the purchase seemed to risk delaying the redevelopment of the area the city's acting director of real estate services recommended council consider expropriation.

Following the redevelopment the city plans to house public washrooms in the building.
