= Walking Eagle News =

Canadian satirical news website

- Type: Satirical news website
- Website: https://walkingeaglenews.com/

Walking Eagle News is an online news satire website which parodies news coverage of Indigenous peoples, politics and Canadian media. The site was founded by Anishinaabe former journalist Tim Fontaine in November 2017, after leaving a nearly two-decade career in journalism. Fontaine serves as the online publication's "Editor-in-Grand-Chief" and primary writer.

Articles on the site cover current events, both real and fictional, satirizing the tone and format of traditional Canadian news organizations. Stories include "'How are my Indians?' Queen asks Trudeau", "White man injured by use of word genocide", "After major Trans Mountain setback, furious Trudeau threatens First Nations with 'fiery reconciliation'", and "First Nations man wakes up white after Indian Status card expires".

In a December 2018 appearance on the CBC News program The Investigators, Fontaine told host Diana Swain that the articles are written using the same format as the ones he would have written as a real journalist, which is why many of them are believed by unsuspecting readers.

Fontaine has said in interviews that besides himself, only one friend who chooses to remain anonymous has written articles for Walking Eagle News and that the site does not accept submissions, though it has received many queries from the public. According to Fontaine, the site's name means "a bird so full of crap that it can't fly", and comes from the punchline of an old joke.
