= Sunshine Sketches of a Little Town =

1912 sequence of stories by Canadian humourist Stephen Leacock

- Author: Stephen Leacock
- Illustrator: Cyrus Cuneo
- Language: English
- Genre: Humour
- Set in: Mariposa
- Publication date: 1912
- Publication place: Canada
- ISBN: 9781414244785

Sunshine Sketches of a Little Town is a sequence of stories by Stephen Leacock, first published in 1912. It is generally considered to be one of the most enduring classics of Canadian humorous literature. The fictional setting for these stories is Mariposa, a small town on the shore of Lake Wissanotti. Although drawn from his experiences in Orillia, Ontario, Leacock notes: "Mariposa is not a real town. On the contrary, it is about seventy or eighty of them. You may find them all the way from Lake Superior to the sea, with the same square streets and the same maple trees and the same churches and hotels."

This work has remained popular for its universal appeal. Many of the characters, though modelled on townspeople of Orillia, are small-town archetypes. Their shortcomings and weaknesses are presented in a humorous but affectionate way. Often, the narrator exaggerates the importance of the events in Mariposa compared to the rest of the world. For example, when there is a country-wide election, "the town of Mariposa, was, of course, the storm centre and focus point of the whole turmoil".

The story of the steamboat Mariposa Belle sinking in Lake Wissanotti is one of the best-loved in the set. The apparent magnitude of this accident is lessened somewhat when it is revealed that the depth of the water is less than six feet. Men from the town come to the rescue in an un-seaworthy lifeboat which sinks beneath them just as they are pulled onto the steamer, and the narrator earnestly remarks that this was "one of the smartest pieces of rescue work ever seen on the lake." It is widely believed that the Mariposa Belle disaster is inspired by the Enterprise disaster on July 31, 1903, in which she suffered a mechanical failure and sank at its wharf in Barrie, Canada.

== Selected list of characters ==
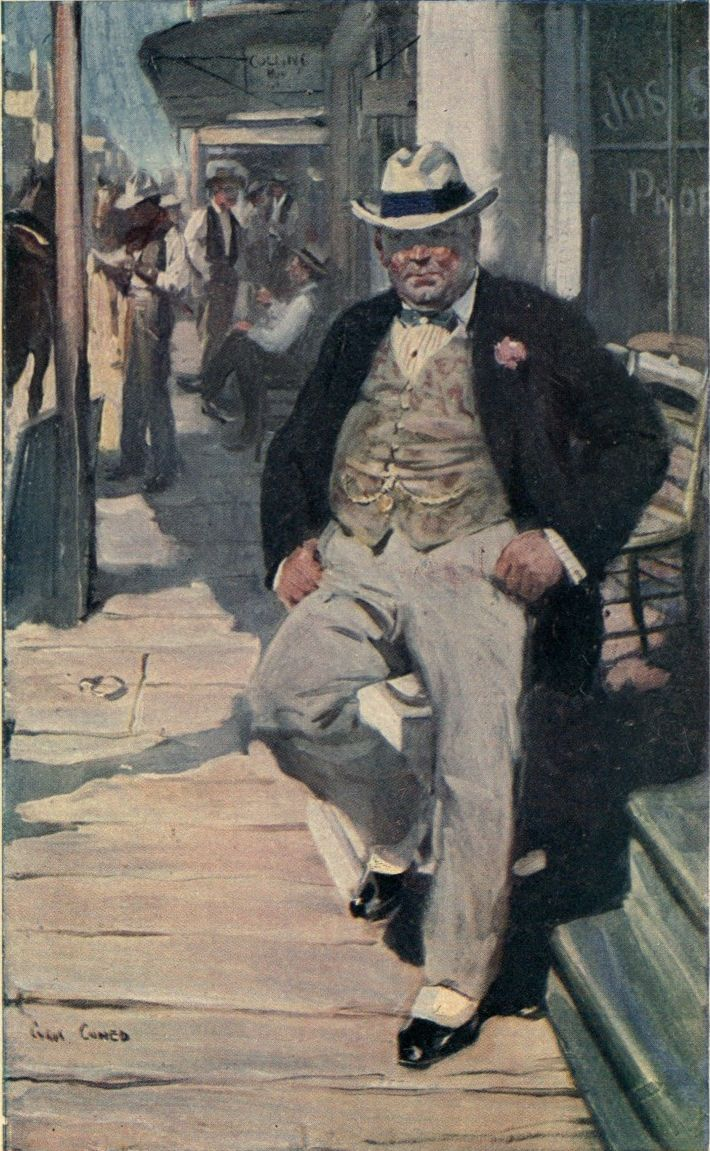
Mr. Smith, as depicted in a 1912 version of the book.

The following characters are interwoven through the set of twelve stories of Sunshine Sketches:

- Josh Smith, proprietor of Smith's Hotel, one of the leading citizens of the town.
- Jefferson Thorpe, owner of the barber shop, who engages in mining speculations.
- Golgotha Gingham, the undertaker, to whom people are less interesting when still alive.
- Dean Rupert Drone, reverend of the "Church of England Church", who has to deal with the debt from building a new church.
- Peter Pupkin, a bank teller who loves the Judge's daughter.
- Zena Pepperleigh, Judge Pepperleigh's daughter. She likes to read romantic stories.
- Dr. Gallagher, collector of Indian relics and student of Canadian history.
- Mr Hussell, journalist for the Mariposa Newspacket.
- Christie Johnson, captain of the Mariposa Belle.
- Henry Mullins, manager of the Mariposa Exchange Bank.
- Narrator, an unreliable narrator, whose descriptions of the town are biased or absurd.

Many characters are based on real-life people from Orillia, Ontario. Their names were only thinly veiled in the original sketches that appeared as a serial in the Montreal Star. Out of an abundance of caution, Leacock changed many characters' names before the sketches were published together in book form.

== Publication ==
The stories in the book were initially published as a sequence of short literary pieces serialized in the Montreal Daily Star from February 17 to June 22, 1912. Leacock reworked the series – by the means of additions, combinations, and divisions (but no deletions) – and assembled it as the book's manuscript. The book was first published on August 9, 1912. Leacock corrected proof pages of the first edition of Sunshine Sketches while in Paris.

In 1923, George Locke commented in the New York Evening Post that library students had chosen the book as one of a dozen "[...] books of prose fiction would best represent the works of Canadian authors to readers who wish to know something of Canadian life".

The book was used in tourist promotions for Orillia as proof of its civic pride for decades following publication.

== Television adaptations ==
=== 1952 TV series ===
In 1952, the book was adapted into a television series, Sunshine Sketches, by CBC Television, the network's first foray into Canadian-produced drama. The cast of the series included John Drainie as the Narrator, Paul Kligman as John Smith, Timothy Findley as Peter Pupkin, Eric House as Dean Drone, Peg Dixon as Liliane Drone and Robert Christie as Golgotha Gingham.

=== 2012 TV movie ===
A second television adaptation premiered on CBC in 2012, and stars Gordon Pinsent and Jill Hennessy. This made-for-TV movie features two stories from the book, "The Marine Excursions of the Knights of Pythias" and "The Hostelry of Mr. Smith", and was created to coincide with the book's 100th anniversary. The stories are a mix of fact and fiction; drawing on details of Leacock's own life and that of his literary creation.

== Learning resources ==
At least two learning resources on Sunshine Sketches have been created for teachers. In 1960, McClelland and Stewart created an educational edition for teachers, with an introduction and questions by D. H. Carr. In 2017, the Public Legal Education Association of Saskatchewan created a comprehensive learning guide for the book alongside an abridged newsletter that reconsiders the book.

== See also ==
- Arcadian Adventures with the Idle Rich (1914), widely viewed as the companion to Sunshine Sketches
- Stephen Leacock Award
