= Pierre Petitclair =

Pierre Petitclair (12 October 1813 – 15 August 1860) was one of the first native French Canadian writers. He wrote two popular plays of the 19th century, La Donation (1842) and Une partie de campagne (1857), the latter notable for using rural québécois speech for the first time on stage. He also composed a number of poems throughout his life.

He started out in studies of law, but flourished as an artist while working as a copyist for the notary Archibald Campbell. During this time he wrote his first play, never staged, Griphon ou la vengeance d'un valet, perhaps the first French-Canadian play. He reached the peak of his career in 1842 publishing within a couple of weeks three poems, “Pauvre soldat! qu’il doit souffrir!,” “À Flore,” and “Le règne du juste,” and also a comedy, “La donation".
