= Path2Integrity =

Path2Integrity (P2I) was a three-and-one-half-year European Union Horizon 2020 project funded under the EU Science with and for Society programme with the goal of enhancing and promoting research integrity through educational materials and outreach.

The project, conducted between January 2019 and June 2022, developed innovative, dialogical learning methods and tools drawing on storytelling and role-playing to support high school educators and students as well as graduate-level researchers. Coordinated by Professor Julia Prieß-Buchheit of the Coburg University of Applied Sciences and Arts, it was the first Horizon 2020 collaborative project to be led by a Bavarian University of Applied Sciences.

The project funding of approximately €2.5 million was allocated within a consortium that consisted of eight partner organisations across five countries.

Path2Integrity was carried out in four phases: analysis, development of teaching materials, dissemination, and evaluation. Its outputs included the multi-language Learning Card Programme, a train-the-trainer scheme for educators, and an associated training centre. During the COVID-19 pandemic, the project adapted its methods for online delivery and continued to reach schools and universities across Europe. In 2020, members of the Path2Integrity consortium developed Trust in Science, a tool designed to help citizens identify trustworthy scientific information. Based on the project’s learning cards, the tool won first place in the “Social and Political Cohesion” category of the EUvsVirus hackathon organised by the European Commission.

The studies undertaken within the P2I programme showed that students increased their trust in science with greater knowledge of the requirements of quality research and the issues around research integrity.

The materials were translated into several European languages and disseminated in at least fifteen countries. All resources produced by the project were made freely available through the project’s website and the open-access repository Zenodo.
