= The Old Fire Hall =

Building in Toronto, Canada

Coordinates: 43.6524°N 79.3734°W

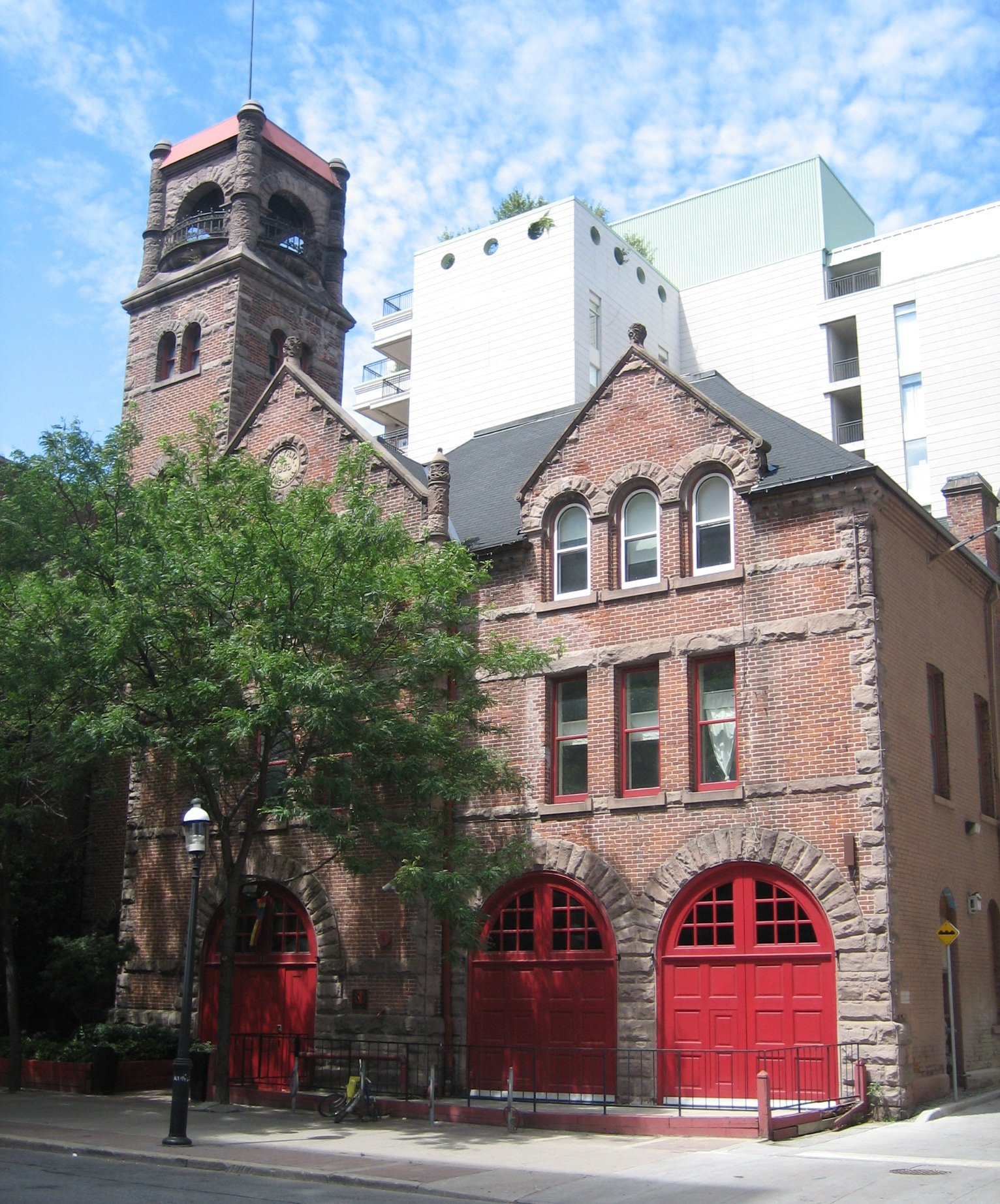
The Old Fire Hall in 2007

The Old Fire Hall is the name given to the original home of The Second City company in Toronto and is located at 110 Lombard Street. The Old Fire Hall was built in 1886 and served as the Toronto Fire Department Headquarters until 1910. It was vacated in 1970, Second City performed there from 1973 until 1997, when it moved to 56 Blue Jays Way (in 2005, the company moved to 51 Mercer Street, and in 2022 it moved to One York Street).

Dan Aykroyd, John Candy, Joe Flaherty, Eugene Levy, Andrea Martin, Mike Myers, Catherine O'Hara, Gilda Radner, Martin Short and Dave Thomas, among others, all got their starts there.

From 2001 until 2011, the Old Fire Hall was the home of Gilda's Club Toronto. Named after Gilda Radner, who had performed with Second City at the Old Fire Hall prior to joining Saturday Night Live, Gilda's Club is a support group and meeting place for people living with cancer.

In 2012, the Old Fire Hall became the new home of the Complections College of Makeup Art and Design.
