= Last Will and Temperament =

Album by The Frantics

"Last Will and Temperament" (also known as "Boot to the Head" or "Mr. Muldoon's Will") is a comedy skit performed by the Canadian comedy troupe The Frantics on their CBC radio series "Frantic Times". It appears on their 1984 album of the same name. The sketch introduced the phrase "boot to the head" that would become their catchphrase, appearing in the sketch "Ti Kwan Leep" three years later in their album Boot to the Head. In 2007, the skit went viral on being set to an animated video with characters from the Capcom video game series Ace Attorney, leading to The Frantics publishing the video to their website and Capcom incorporating it to the 2014 Nintendo 3DS release of Phoenix Wright: Ace Attorney Trilogy.

== Premise ==
The premise is that the last will of Arthur Durham Muldoon is being read, by a lawyer, to Muldoon's overly emotional sister Jenny, her timid husband Hank, his drunken brother Hedge, his know-it-all-nephew Ralston, and Muldoon's caretaker Mrs. Mulroy. All are present for this reading and everyone thinks they are getting a piece of his fortune, but as the will is read aloud, they learn that Muldoon has only bequeathed them a "boot to the head" (with the exception of Hedge, who also receives three crates of whiskey and the contents of Muldoon's wine cellar), the lawyer character kicking them physically in the head (illustrated with a prop leg hitting them from off screen). Every attending member, including Muldoon's cat, receives a boot to the head, though Jenny and Hank each receive an additional boot for every "inheritance" bequeathed per Muldoon's order.

Muldoon leaves not a boot to the head to his lawyer, but a rabid Tasmanian devil down his trousers, and in the midst of this, announces that Mr. Muldoon's entire CDN $10 million fortune will be given to the city of Calgary, Alberta "so they can afford to move somewhere decent." Finally, the lawyer announces that Muldoon is leaving them each a lifetime supply of ice cream, to which Mrs. Mulroy asks "What flavor is it?". The lawyer replies "Boot to the head!" and each receives one final kick.

Sometimes, when this airs on Dr. Demento's radio program, it is followed by the theme song "Boot to the Head" from said 1987 album.

== Cast ==
- Paul Chato – Lawyer
- Rick Green – Ralston
- Dan Redican – Hedge
- Peter Wildman – Hank
- Carolyn Scott (guest star) – Jenny, Ms. Mulroy

== Television version ==
The television version, as seen in the second episode of their CBC Television series Four on the Floor (known as "The Frantics" outside Canada), is one minute shorter than the radio and album version, and does not include the wine cellar for Hedge (just the three cases of whiskey) nor does it include the nephew Ralston, the Tasmanian Devil joke or the ice cream punchline. Additionally, Rick Green dresses in drag to play Ms. Mulroy and Jenny's husband is renamed Chester.

== Animated version ==
In April 2007, an animated video pitting the skit to character models from the Capcom video game series Ace Attorney, entitled Phoenix Wright – Boot to the Head, was uploaded to YouTube by CMSPyrowolf, subsequently going viral, and The Frantics posting the video to their website. Consequently, in the 2014 Nintendo 3DS release of the compilation Phoenix Wright: Ace Attorney Trilogy, the script of "Rise From the Ashes" was updated to include reference to the skit, where if the player presents incorrect evidence when trying to connect Chief Damon Gant to the murder of Detective Goodman, the Judge berates defense attorney Phoenix Wright by saying "Don't 'oops' me! Maybe this boot to the head will knock some sense into you."
