= Official Bootleg CD =

Official Bootleg CD - Live at the Tim Sims Theatre

Studio album by The Frantics
- Released: 2004
- Recorded: 2004
- Genre: Comedy
- Length: unknown
- Label: Frantics World Limited
- Producer: Marvin Dolgay

The Frantics chronology
Boot to the Head (1987)	Official Bootleg CD - Live at the Tim Sims Theatre (2004)	Enemies of Reason (2006)

Official Bootleg CD - Live at the Tim Sims Theatre is a Canadian comedy album, performed by The Frantics comedy troupe. It contains largely new material (the only exceptions are "Einstein Song", and "Dutch Cowboys", which derive from their Frantic Times radio series), used in their "Older But Wider" tour in 2004. The sketches were recorded from a single night's performance on June 24, 2004 at the Tim Sims Playhouse in Toronto.

== Personnel ==
- Paul Chato
- Rick Green
- Dan Redican
- Peter Wildman

== Track listing ==
1. "American Jesus"
2. "Timmy Target Hotel"
3. "Army Careers"
4. "Do You Wanna"
5. "Good Shit"
6. "Naughty Aliens"
7. "The Offering"
8. "Einstein Song"
9. "Photo of Mary"
10. "Raccoon Startler"
11. "Dutch Cowboys"
