= 12th ACTRA Awards =

Canadian television awards ceremony

- Date: April 16, 1983
- Hosted by: Don Harron

Highlights
- Best TV Program: Billy Bishop Goes to War
- Best Radio Program: Scales of Justice: "Fruit of the Poisoned Tree"

Television/radio coverage
- Network: CBC Television

The 12th ACTRA Awards were presented on April 16, 1983. The ceremony was hosted by Don Harron.

Prime Minister Pierre Trudeau presented the top award for Best Television Program, and jokingly added Question Period as a fourth nominee in the category.

== Television ==
Best Television Program	Earle Grey Award
Billy Bishop Goes to War; Blind Faith; Strawberry Ice	Rosemary Dunsmore, Blind Faith; Chapelle Jaffe, Born to Love; Eric Peterson, Billy Bishop Goes to War
Best Continuing TV Performance	Best Supporting TV Performance
Louis Del Grande, Seeing Things; Bruno Gerussi, The Beachcombers; Gerard Parkes, Home Fires	Budd Knapp, A Choice of Two; Marigold Charlesworth, Judge; Ed McNamara, Judge
Best New Performer	Best TV Variety Performance
Allan Katz, Home Fires; Judah Katz, Hangin' In; Yanna McIntosh, Hangin' In	Toller Cranston, Strawberry Ice; Tom Harvey, Bizarre; Jeff Hyslop, 1982 Dora Mavor Moore Awards; Catherine O'Hara, SCTV
Best Television Host or Interviewer	Best Children's Television Program
Eric Malling, The Fifth Estate; Harry Brown, Speaking Out; Morton Shulman, The Shulman File	On My Own; Mr. Dressup; What's New
Best Writing, Television Drama	Best Writing, Television Comedy/Variety
Sheldon Chad, Seeing Things: "Seeing Double"; David McLaren, By Reason of Insanity; Anna Sandor and Bill Gough, Seeing Things: "Looking Back"	Roger Abbott, Dave Broadfoot, Don Ferguson, Gord Holtam, John Morgan and Rick Olsen, Royal Canadian Air Farce; Toller Cranston, Strawberry Ice; Johnny Wayne, Frank Shuster, Robert Cormier, Kate Lonsdale and Ted Lonsdale, Wayne and Shuster
Best Writing, Television Public Affairs
Peter Kent, The Journal: "Struggle for Poland"; Allan Bailey, The Nature of Things: "The Super Achievers"; Bob Lower, After the Big One

== Radio ==
Best Radio Program	Best Radio Host or Interviewer
Scales of Justice: "Fruit of the Poisoned Tree"; Bloodflowers; Nuclear Peace	Peter Gzowski, Morningside; Vicki Gabereau, Variety Tonight; Elizabeth Gray, As It Happens; Jay Ingram, Quirks & Quarks
Best Radio Actor	Best Radio Variety Performance
Gerard Parkes, 1,000 Years of the Nights; Nonnie Griffin, Our Town; Barney O'Sullivan, From Failing Hands	Roger Abbott, Dave Broadfoot, Don Ferguson, Luba Goy and John Morgan, Royal Canadian Air Farce; Édith Butler, Morningside; Paul Chato, Rick Green, Dan Redican, Carolyn Scott and Peter Wildman, Frantic Times; Cal Dodd, The Entertainers; Calla Krause, La voix humaine
Best Writing, Radio Drama	Best Writing, Radio Variety
Michael Riordan, Quiet in the Hills; Mavor Moore, Catch My Death; Linda Zwicker, The Eighth Wonder	Roger Abbott, Dave Broadfoot, Don Ferguson, Gord Holtam, John Morgan and Rick Olsen, Royal Canadian Air Farce; Paul Chato, Rick Green, Dan Redican and Peter Wildman, Frantic Times; David Tarnow, The Entertainers
Best Writing, Radio Documentary
Diane Silverman, How Shall I Live Without You; Elizabeth Hay, Sunday Morning: "Sally Ann in Newfoundland"; Jurgen Hesse, Ideas: "Witch Hunts"

== Journalism and special awards ==
Gordon Sinclair Award	Foster Hewitt Award
Laurier LaPierre; Bill Cameron; Peter Kent	Steve Armitage; George Athans; Dave Hodge
John Drainie Award
Lucio Agostini
