= Enemies of Reason =

Studio album by The Frantics
- Released: 2006
- Recorded: 2005
- Genre: Comedy
- Length: 37:27
- Label: Frantics World Limited
- Producer: Marvin Dolgay

The Frantics chronology
Official Bootleg CD - Live at the Tim Sims Playhouse (2004)	Enemies of Reason (2006)

Enemies of Reason is a comedy album performed by the Frantics Canadian comedy troupe. The sketches were recorded live in front of an audience at Toronto's Yuk Yuks venue on November 20, 2005. Some of these skits also appeared on "The Frantics Reunion Special" television show, as well as on an episode of CBC Radio One's Madly Off in All Directions.

== Personnel ==
- Paul Chato
- Rick Green
- Dan Redican
- Peter Wildman

== Track listing ==
1. "Just 5 Minutes"
2. "Earth Raper"
3. "Chunder Business School"
4. "My Lovely Lovely Body"
5. "New Condo"
6. "Whenever I'm Near You"
7. "Some Weather"
8. "Sex Book"
9. "P.A.S."
10. "Magnum Weekend"
11. "Prostate Song"
12. "The Saturn Way"
13. "Clinical Advice"
14. "Truth Song"
15. "Barney's Useless Utensils"
16. "Vagina Bound"
