= Boot to the Head =

Studio album by The Frantics
- Released: 1987
- Recorded: 1986
- Genre: Comedy
- Length: 44:49
- Label: Attic Records
- Producer: Marvin Dolgay

The Frantics chronology
Frantic Times (1984)	Boot to the Head (1987)	Official Bootleg CD (2004)

Boot to the Head is a comedy album performed by the Canadian comedy troupe The Frantics. Originally released as an LP in 1987, it was re-issued in 1996 as a CD with the same track listing. The album features a number of skits from their radio show Frantic Times, as well as a few sketches that could not be aired to a general audience. The sketches were recorded over a three-day period in front of a live audience at the Toronto Free Theatre.

== Personnel ==
- Paul Chato
- Rick Green
- Dan Redican
- Peter Wildman

== Track listing ==
1. "A Piece of Pie" – 4:33
2. "I Shot Bambi's Mother" – 1:20
3. "Driving Chicks Mad" – 3:23
4. "A Poem" – 0:35
5. "Game Show, Game Show" – 2:02
6. "Bill from Bala" – 4:42
7. "A Poem" – 3:11
8. "Architecture Today" – 3:11
9. "Mrs. G" – 2:24
10. "Worshippers 'R' Us" – 4:05
11. "You People Are Fat" – 3:32
12. "Making Love" – 2:14
13. "A Poem" – 1:12
14. "Make Up Dirty Words" – 1:58
15. "You Scare the **** Out of Me" – 2:53
16. "Ti Kwan Leep" – 4:52
17. "Boot to the Head" – 1:36

== Notes ==
"Ti Kwan Leep" is the most famous skit from this album, followed by the title song "Boot to the Head". These are both regularly played on the Doctor Demento radio show. In the skit, a martial arts master attempts to introduce his students to meditation but is repeatedly interrupted by one of them, Ed Gruberman. Ed wants to forgo the intricacies of harmonious Eastern philosophy and learn about "trashing bozos," only for the master to kick him repeatedly in the head. An all-out brawl ensues, which the master handily wins by beating up all of his students in quick succession. The song recites a long litany of people doing idiotic or annoying things, and recommending that they should receive a "boot to the head!" However, their iconic phrase became famous three years earlier in "Last Will and Temperament" from their Frantic Times album.

Several of the other skits are also considered to be classics, such as "A Piece Of Pie", and "You Scare The **** Out Of Me", which have occasionally appeared in the troupe's shows after their reunion in 2004 and 2005. The former skit involves a man who confides to his friend that he has just excreted a whole, well-formed piece of pie, and the latter is a self-explanatory song. Neither skit could have been aired on their long-running CBC radio show.

Despite the resemblance, Frantics member Paul Chato claims the person getting his head booted on the cover is not supposed to be him.
