= List of Prisoners of Gravity episodes =

Prisoners of Gravity was a Canadian public broadcasting television news magazine program that explored speculative fiction — science fiction, fantasy, horror, comic books — and its relation to various thematic and social issues. Produced by TVOntario, the show was the brainchild of former comic retail manager Mark Askwith, writer Daniel Richler, and Rick Green (of The Frantics comedy troupe), who served as host of the show. The series aired 139 episodes over 5 seasons from 1989 to 1994.

== Prisoners of Gravity episodes ==
=== Season 1 ===
Title	Original release date
"Irony in Comics"	August 21, 1989
"The Abyss"	September 11, 1989
"Nuclear Weapons"	September 18, 1989
"Environment"	September 25, 1989
"Time Travel"	October 2, 1989
"Animation 1"	October 9, 1989
"Animation 2"	October 16, 1989
"Horror"	October 23, 1989
"The American Nightmare"	October 30, 1989
"Comic Book Conventions"	November 6, 1989
"Sex in SF and Comics"	November 13, 1989
"Misc."	November 20, 1989
"UFO Abduction"	November 27, 1989
"Time Travel"	December 4, 1989
"Time Travel"	December 11, 1989
"Holidays"	December 18, 1989
"Humour"	January 8, 1990
"Misc."	January 15, 1990
"Misc."	January 22, 1990
"My Life in Comics"	January 29, 1990
"Horror Revisited"	February 5, 1990
"SF's True North"	February 12, 1990
"Dystopian Visions"	February 19, 1990
"Star Trek: The Old Generation"	February 26, 1990
"Star Trek, Too"	March 5, 1990
"Fantasy"	March 12, 1990
"Farewell"	March 19, 1990

=== Season 2 ===
No.	Title	Original release date
395201	"Adaptations"	October 4, 1990
Commander Rick interrupts Second Nature to look at how comics and science fiction translate to film and vice versa. Interviews with Bob Kane (creator, Batman), Frank Miller (writer, Robocop), Kevin Eastman (co-creator, Teenage Mutant Ninja Turtles), Max Allen Collins (writer, Dick Tracy), Dave Stevens (artist, The Rocketeer), Larry Niven (sf writer), George R.R. Martin (sf writer), Bill Sienkiewicz (comic book artist), Rick Geary (comic artist), Michael W. Kaluta (comic artist) and Harlan Ellison (SF writer and critic), with film clips from Batman, Duck Tales, Teenage Mutant Ninja Turtles (movie and cartoon), Total Recall and Akira.
395202	"Heroes and Superheroes"	October 11, 1990
Commander Rick interviews many top comic book creators on the central theme of North American comics: heroes and superheroes. Frank Miller (writer, Robocop), Elaine Lee (writer, Starstuck comic), Will Eisner (ground-breaking comic creator, The Spirit), Trina Robbins (artist, Rosie the Riveter), Gilbert Hernandez (co-creator, Love and Rockets comic), David Lloyd (artist, V For Vendetta), Denys Cowan (artist, The Question), Chris Claremont (writer, The Uncanny X-Men) and Bob Kane (creator, Batman) offer their opinions, while science fiction writers George R.R. Martin (Wild Cards) and Larry Niven (acclaimed "hard sf" writer) take a realistic view of superheroes. The Flash TV show is profiled, with clips from the show and interviews with actor John Wesley Shipp and executive producer Danny Bilson. Nichelle Nichols (Commander Uhura) discusses the nature of the hero in Star Trek.
395203	"Will Eisner and the Spirit"	October 18, 1990
Commander Rick celebrates the 50th anniversary of Will Eisner's landmark comic strip, The Spirit. A lengthy interview with Eisner is highlighted by tributes from Denis Kitchen (publisher, Kitchen Sink Press), Bob Kane (creator, Batman), Sergio Aragones (artist, Mad Magazine), Trina Robbins (comic book artist), Kevin Eastman (co-creator, Teenage Mutant Ninja Turtles) and Frank (Robocop) Miller.
395204	"Censorship"	October 25, 1990
Commander Rick "censors" TVOntario host Enrico Gruen's Second Nature to discuss censorship with Frank Miller (Robocop 2 writer), Charles Vess (comic book artist), Denys Cowan (artist, The Question), David Lloyd (artist, V For Vendetta) and Elaine Lee (writer, Starstruck) from the world of comics, and speculative fiction writers Harlan Ellison, Spider Robinson, Jack Vance and Clive Barker.
395205	"Aliens"	November 1, 1990
Commander Rick has been watching B-movies, and discusses aliens with science fiction authors George R.R. Martin, Larry Niven, Jack Vance, Gregory Benford, Nancy Kress, Leslie Gadallah, Spider Robinson, George Zebrowski and Judith Merril (founder of Toronto's Spaced Out Library). From the world of comics, Rick interviews Mark Verheiden about Alien and Predator, and Elaine Lee about Starstruck.
395206	"Collaborations"	November 8, 1990
Commander Rick looks at the collaborative process in comics and speculative fiction, featuring science fiction publisher Jim Baen and writers Gregory Benford, Judith Merril, George Zebrowski and Canadian husband-and-wife team Spider and Jeanne Robinson. Starstruck collaborators Elaine Lee and Michael Kaluta are joined by Uncanny X-men writer Chris Claremont, The Question artist Denys Cowan, Incredible Hulk writer Peter David and Frank Miller, who writes Hardboiled and Give Me Liberty.
395207	"Stereotypes"	November 15, 1990
In his geosynchronic satellite, Commander Rick examines the treatment of stereotypes in comic books and speculative fiction. Interviews include Will Eisner (who discussed Jewish issues in his comics), Denys Cowan (one of the first black professionals in comics), Elaine Lee (on the challenges of creating characters of different ethnic backgrounds than her own), Hispanic comic book artists Sergio Aragones and Gilbert Hernandez, Chris Claremont (writer of the multiracial Uncanny X-Men), Trina Robbins (one of the few women artists in comics), Jack Womack (discussing minority characters in his work), and Star Trek's Commander Uhura, Nichelle Nichols, one of the first black women on TV.
395208	"Evoking the Future: Language"	November 22, 1990
"Language is a virus from outer space" – William Burroughs. Commander Rick speaks the language of comics and speculative fiction with sf writers Gregory Benford, Jack Vance, Jack Womack, Kenneth Oppel, Guy Gavriel Kay and Pamela Sargent, with comic creators Terry Beatty, Mark Askwith and Terry Beatty. British animator Nick Park (Peter Gabriel's video Sledgehammer) shows models and clips from his award-winning feature, Creature Comforts.
395209	"Sex and AIDS"	November 29, 1990
To coincide with International AIDS Day on December 1, Commander Rick looks at the treatment of sex and AIDS in comics and science fiction. Interviews include science fiction publisher Jim Baen and writers Tanya Huff, Garfield Reeves-Stevens, Gregory Benford, Pamela Sargent and George Zebrowski. From the comic book scene, Rick talks with Los Bros Hernandez (Love and Rockets), Mark DeMatteis (Moonshadow), Fabian Nicieza (New Warriors) and Todd McFarlane (writer/artist of Spiderman, the best-selling comic book ever). Editor Trina Robbins and contributor Steve Leialoha talk about the comic book fundraiser Strip AIDS USA. Star Trek's Commander Uhura, Nichelle Nichols, and B-movie trailers from Sinister Cinema are also featured.
395210	"Science and Technology"	December 6, 1990
Commander Rick debates the impact science and technology are having on society with science fiction writers Gregory Benford (PhD, Physics), Robert Sawyer (computer programmer), Jack Womack (neo-Luddite) and fellow techno-peasant Spider Robinson. Rick attempts to control the technology onboard his communications satellite Reality One by wiring together a "pow-R glove" – with hilarious results!
395211	"M-Space: Moebius and Merril"	December 13, 1990
This show is brought to you by the letter M! Commander Rick profiles French comic book artist Moebius (Jean Giraud), the ground-breaking creator of Metal Hurlant a.k.a. Heavy Metal. On the eve of the Toronto Public Library's Spaced Out Library new identity as The Merril Collection of Science Fiction, Speculation and Fantasy, the Commander also pays tribute to Judith Merril, one of the earliest and most influential women in the field of science fiction.
395212	"Families"	December 20, 1990
The Commander will once again be spending the holidays alone this year, and has decided to look at the role of families in his favourite genres: Why do comic book characters band together to form surrogate families? And why does science fiction portray families as both the protector and as the greatest threat? British comic book artist Neil Gaiman talks about his book Violent Cases, and comic book artists Bill Sienkiewicz and Matt Wagner discuss the representation of families in their work. From the science fiction side of the fence, Rick talks with writers Garfield Reeves-Stevens, Lewis Shiner and husband-and-wife team Pamela Sargent and George Zebrowski.
395213	"Music"	January 3, 1991
Commander Rick's music show, featuring his pirate radio station CMDR: highlights include the week's top 10, SF writer Spider Robinson singing, Rush drummer/lyricist Neil Peart on why he's an avid SF fan, Edward Scissorhands musical composer Danny Elfman, SF writer/music critic Harlan Ellison. Other interviews include: comic book creators Gilbert Hernandez, Steve Leialoha, George Pratt and Bill Sienkiewicz; fantasy authors Charles De Lint, Tanya Huff and Guy Gavriel Kay; and SF writer Lewis Shiner. Featuring videos from Rush and Level 42.
395214	"Evoking the Future: Setting"	January 10, 1991
Commander Rick looks at the importance of setting in evoking future worlds with his guests: speculative fiction writers Gregory Benford, Charles De Lint, Candas Jane Dorsey, Leslie Gadallah, Tanya Huff, Donald Kingsbury, Nancy Kress, Larry Niven, Garfield and Judith Reeves-Stevens, Jack Vance, and award-winning SF cover artist Frank Kelly Freas. Will Eisner, Rick Geary, Bob Kane, Charles Vance and Matt Wagner discuss the role of setting in comics.
395215	"Animation 1"	January 17, 1991
Disney's release of the restored version of Fantasia inspires Commander Rick to look at animation. Rick discusses the pivotal role of Fantasia with original Disney animator Ollie Johnston, restoration sound supervisor Terry Porter, and animation historian Charles Solomon. Japanese animated feature Akira is discussed with its North American distributor Carl Macek and comic book artist M.W. Kaluta. Also, David Fine talks about his Gemini-award winning short George and Rosemary, Claymation creator Will Vinton discusses his California Raisins, and British animator Nick Park discusses his British Academy-Award winning feature, Creature Comforts.
395216	"Robots and Artificial Intelligence"	January 24, 1991
Commander Rick wants to discuss Robots, a subject near and dear to his heart, but NanCy, his Nano-Cybernetic 3000 computer, foils his plans and changes this week's topic to Artificial Intelligence. Rick's guests include Robocop 2 screenwriter Frank Miller, SF editor Judith Merril, SF critic Brian Fawcett, Hitch Hiker's Guide to the Galaxy creator Douglas Adams, with SF authors Gregory Benford, Donald Kingsbury, Nancy Kress, Garfield and Judith Reeves-Stevens, Pamela Sargent, Robert Sawyer, Lewis Shiner, and George Zebrowski. With clips from Hardware and Robocop 2.
395217	"Voice/American Artform"	January 31, 1991
Orbiting the planet in his communications satellite, Commander Rick (with the aid of his trusty computer – Nancy) wonders whether there is truly a Canadian voice in science fiction and comics, or whether these artforms have become Americanized. Rick's guests include SF writers Spider Robinson, Harlan Ellison, Guy Gavriel Kay, Nancy Kress, Gregory Benford, Candas Jane Dorsey, Tanya Huff, Dave Duncan, Judith Merril, and Garfield and Judith Reeves-Stevens, with Will Eisner, Moebius, Bill Sienkiewicz, Denys Cowan and Chester Brown from the world of comic books.
395218	"Humour"	February 7, 1991
Commander Rick gets funny, with: Farmer/Author Charlie Farquharson (a.k.a. Don Harron); Douglas Adams of Hitch Hiker's Guide to the Galaxy fame; Dan "Bizarro" Piraro; Mad Magazine cartoonist Sergio Aragones; and SF writer Spider Robinson.
395219	"Projects"	February 14, 1991
Commander Rick highlights some upcoming projects to watch out for, including: Will Eisner's new graphic novel, To The Heart Of The Storm; Neil Gaiman's latest issue of The Sandman; Todd McFarlane's new Spider-Man; George Pratt's timely examination of war, Enemy Ace; Alice, the long-awaited new Woody Allen film; and Anijam, an animated feature by cartoonists from around the world, produced by Bambi Meets Godzilla creator Marv Newland.
395220	"Horror"	February 21, 1991
Commander Rick's horror show, starring: British horror writer/director Clive Barker; Swamp Thing artist Steve Bissette; Good Omens co-author Neil Gaiman; Black Water 2 editor Alberto Manguel; Mike Mignola, artist on Clive Barker's Hellraiser; Canadian horror writer Garfield Reeves-Stevens; Marvel Comics writer Louise Simonson; horror writer/cartoonist Gahan Wilson; and Julian Grant, the Canadian distributor for B-movie home video company, Sinister Cinema.
395221	"Marketing and Merchandising"	February 28, 1991
Commander Rick explores the wonders of marketing with his guests: Simpsons creator Matt Groening, with show producers James L. Brooks and Sam Simon; Kevin Eastman, co-creator of The Teenage Mutant Ninja Turtles; horror writer Peter Straub, author of Koko and Ghost Story; Batman creator Bob Kane; Robocop 2 screenwriter Frank Miller; fantasy writers Terry Brooks and Guy Gavriel Kay; Will Eisner, creator of The Spirit; Wild Cards creator George R.R. Martin; writer Jack Vance reminisces about his friend, Dune creator Frank Herbert; married writers Spider and Jeanne Robinson; and Bill Marks of Vortex Comics, Jim Baen of Baen Books and Fabian Nicieza of Marvel Comics. Rick spoofs the Home Shopping Network, Calvin Klein's Obsession commercials and American express.
395222	"Violence"	March 7, 1991
Commander Rick examines the role of violence in comics and SF, with his guests: Aliens 3 director Walter Hill; Canadian fantasy writers Charles De Lint, Shirley Meier and S.M. Stirling; American SF writers Lewis Shiner and Jack Womack; horror writer Peter Straub; and Terry Beatty (Ms. Tree), Steve Bissette (Taboo), Neil Gaiman (Sandman), Todd McFarlane (Spider-Man), Bill Sienkiewicz (Big Numbers), Walt Simonson (Thor) and Ty Templeton (Stig's Inferno) discussing violence in comic books.
395223	"Chaos"	March 14, 1991
Chaos theory is being hailed as the other major scientific development of this century after relativity and quantum physics – featuring author James Gleick (whose 1985 book brought Chaos to the world's attention), Bill Sienkiewicz, artist on Big Numbers (a 12-issue comic book series about chaos theory), Commodore Amiga computer product manager Jeff Evans, with computerized fractal images by computer hacker Caleb Howard and U.S. animators Art Matrix and Panspermia from Karl Sims/Thinking Machines.
395224	"Form"	March 22, 1991
Commander Rick explores different forms — novella vs. short story, trilogy vs. series — in comics and speculative fiction, with his guests: Bizarro cartoonist Dan Piraro, Teenage Mutant Ninja Turtles co-creator Kevin Eastman, Sandman writer Neil Gaiman, Uncanny X-Men writer Chris Claremont, Spirit creator Will Eisner, Love and Rockets co-creator Gilbert Hernandez, V For Vendetta artist David Lloyd, Stig's Inferno creator Ty Templeton, speculative writers Dave Duncan, Crawford Killian, Tanya Huff, Guy Gavriel Kay and George Zebrowski, and SF editors Jim Baen, Marianne Neilsen and Judith Merril. With clips from Misery and animation from Dan Piraro.
395225	"Profiles"	March 28, 1991
Commander Rick sings the praises of Daniel Clowes, Peter Straub and Marv Newland. Daniel Clowes, the writer/artist of the alternative comic books Eightball and Lloyd Llewellyn, Private Eye, has been compared to David Lynch for his story-telling style and surreal sensibility. Peter Straub won the World Fantasy Award in 1985 for his novel, Floating Dragon, and has since penned such best-sellers as Koko, Mystery, Houses Without Doors and co-wrote The Talisman with Stephen King. Marv Newland created the animated cult favourite, "Bambi Meets Godzilla", and a slew of other cutting-edge underground classics. Rick shows some of his favourites, including "Sing Beast Sing", "Black Hula" and "Lupo the Butcher".
395226	"Myths and Archetypes"	April 4, 1991
Commander Rick looks at the importance of myths and archetypes in comic books and speculative fiction with Walt Simonson, Chris Claremont, Neil Gaiman, Matt Wagner, and Arkham Asylum co-creators Dave McKean and Grant Morrison from the world of comics, and Canadian writers Robert Sawyer, Charles De Lint, Guy Gavriel Kay, horror expert Robert Hadji and horror writer/director Clive Barker. With clips from The Doors, The Adventures of Superman, and Frankenstein.
395227	"Villains"	April 11, 1991
Commander Rick looks at the role of villains in comic books and science fiction with his guests: Taboo publisher Steve Bissette; comic writers Neil Gaiman (The Sandman), Archie Goodwin (Wolverine), Max Allen Collins (Dick Tracy), Fabian Nicieza (The New Warriors), Louise Simonson (Superman), Kate Worley (Omaha, the Cat Dancer), with comic book artists Ty Templeton and Mike Mignola; Canadian speculative fiction writers Tanya Huff, Charles De Lint and Garfield Reeves-Stevens; and American authors Nancy Kress, Jack Womack and Peter Straub.
395228	"Ecology"	April 18, 1991
The hoopla surrounding Earth Day on April 22 inspires Commander Rick to take the pulse of the planet as diagnosed in comic books and speculative fiction, with: SF humorist Douglas Adams; Canadian comic book artist Ty Templeton; Sinister Cinema distributor Julian Grant; Taboo publisher Steve Bissette; Science Matters co-author James Trefil; and SF writers Robert Sawyer, Spider Robinson, Garfield and Judith Reeves- Stevens, Larry Niven, Gregory Benford, Lewis Shiner, Nancy Kress, Pamela Sargent and Lois McMaster Bujold.
395229	"Women"	April 25, 1991
The representation of women in comic books and speculative fiction, discussed with comic book creators Trina Robbins (author, Women in the Comics), June Brigman (Barbie), Louise Simonson (Superman), Kate Worley (Omaha, the Cat Dancer), Elaine Lee (Starstruck), Chris Claremont (The Uncanny X-Men) and Steve Bissette (Taboo); with SF writers Lois McMaster Bujold, Leona Gom, Karen Wehrstein, Tanya Huff, Candas Jane Dorsey, Pamela Sargent, Gregory Benford, Terence Green, and Science-Fiction Studies editor Veronica Hollinger.
395230	"Leisure"	May 2, 1991
Commander Rick examines the question of how we will spend our leisure time in the future with groundbreaking cyberpunk writers William Gibson (Neuromancer) and Bruce Sterling (Schismatrix), SF funnyman Douglas Adams, Nebula Award-winning SF writer Lois McMaster Bujold, Canadian SF writers Candas Jane Dorsey, Andrew Weiner and Terrence Green and Canadian anthologist Alberto Manguel (Black Water 2), with American SF authors Christopher Hinz, Jack Womack, Gregory Benford. From the comic book side of the fence, Rick is joined by Mark Chiarello (creator, Stars of the Negro Leagues) Todd McFarlane (Spider-Man), Walt Simonson (Thor) and Louise Simonson (Superman), Ty Templeton (Justice League), Fabian Nicieza (The New Warriors), Steve Bissette (Swamp Thing), and Neil Gaiman (Sandman). Featuring never-before-seen footage of how Commander Rick spent his spare time when he was still earthbound.

=== Season 3 ===
No.	Title	Original release date
426601	"Projects"	October 3, 1991
Commander Rick looks at upcoming projects from the worlds of comics, animation and science fiction. His interviews include Michael Carlin (DC comics editor), George Pratt (writer/artist, Enemy Ace), James Morrow (SF writer, Towing Jehovah), cyberpunk guru/SF writer William Gibson (Neuromancer) and Michael Swanwick (author, Stations of the Tide). Comic book publisher Neal Adams discusses the animated series Bucky O'Hare, and actors Michael Dorn ("Worf", Star Trek: The Next Generation) and Walter Koenig (Star Trek's "Chekov") reveal a behind-the-scenes look at Star Trek 6: The Undiscovered Country.
426602	"Alternate Historeies"	October 10, 1991
1991 Commander Rick looks at alternate histories – what might have been had certain historical events been altered – with speculative fiction writers George Alec Effinger (Everything But Honor), Gregory Benford (editor, What Might Have Been), Paul Di Filippo (Ciphers), Kim Stanley Robinson (Remaking History), Terry Bisson (Fire on the Mountain), William Gibson and Bruce Sterling (co-authors, The Difference Engine), Alternate presidents anthology editor Mike Resnick and contributor Martha Soukup, plus Neil Gaiman (writer, DC Comics' The Sandman).
426603	"Religion"	October 17, 1991
Commander Rick looks at the role of religion in science fiction and comics with writers Neil Gaiman (The Sandman), James Morrow (Only Begotten Daughter), Clive Barker (Imajica), Spider Robinson ("God is an Iron"), Connie Willis (Fire Watch), George Alec Effinger (When Gravity Fails), Douglas Adams (The Hitch Hikers' Guide to the Galaxy), and Nancy Kress (Brain Rose), with Neal Adams (artist, Green Lantern/Green Arrow), Dan Raspler (editor, The Demon), Keith Giffen (writer/artist, The Legion of Super-Heroes), and Rick Taylor (writer/artist, The Synergist) from the world of comics.
426604	"Addictions"	October 24, 1991
Commander Rick looks at how drug and alcohol addictions have been represented in science fiction and comics, as well as their effects on creators. Featuring a special look at the Spider-Man anti-drugs comics being issued by Marvel Comics, the Addiction Research Foundation and the Canadian Association of Chiefs of Police, with the ARF's Henry Schankula and project initiator Eric Conroy. Other guests include Steve Bissette (publisher, Taboo), comic creators Denny O'Neil (writer, Green Lantern/Green Arrow), Neal Adams (artist, Green Lantern/Green Arrow), and writers James Patrick Kelly ("Rat"), Gregory Benford ("Doing Lennon"), Spider Robinson (Mindkiller), Larry Niven (Playgrounds of the Mind), Pat Cadigan (Synners), and William Gibson (Mona Lisa Overdrive).
426605	"Fear"	October 31, 1991
Commander Rick celebrates Hallowe'en by looking at what scares us, with his guests: DC comics editor Archie Goodwin (Batman: Legends of the Dark Knight), comic writers Pete Milligan (Shade: The Changing Man), Neil Gaiman (The Sandman) and Grant Morrison (Doom Patrol); with speculative fiction writers Tanya Huff (Blood Price), Bob Shaw (The Ragged Astronauts), Lewis Shiner (White City), Brian Stableford (The Empire of Fear), Geoff Ryman (Was), horror editor Steve Jones and horror writer/director Clive Barker (The Books of Blood).
426606	"War"	November 7, 1991
Commander Rick's Remembrance Day special, featuring writers Peter Straub (Koko), Bruce Sterling (Islands in the Net), Martha Soukup (Plowshare), Dan Simmons (Hyperion), Kristine Kathryn Rusch (The White Mists of Power), Connie Willis (Fire Watch), and comic creators Archie Goodwin (writer/editor, Blazing Combat), Dave Gibbons (writer/artist, Rogue Trooper) and Joyce Brabner (editor/writer, Real War Stories).
426607	"Dreams"	November 14, 1991
Featuring authors Brian Stableford (The Empire of Fear), Clive Barker (Imajica), Peter Straub (Mystery), Jack Dann (Junction), Pat Cadigan (Synners), Barrington J. Bayley (The Forest of Peldain), Michael Moorcock (The Dreaming City), and Brian Aldiss (Forgotten Life). The Sandman creator Neil Gaiman discusses dreams in comics with the help of Sandman inker Mark Buckingham.
426608	"Children"	November 21, 1991
Commander Rick's guests include SF reviewer John Clute, Kristine Kathryn Rusch (editor, The Magazine of Fantasy and Science Fiction), and speculative fiction writers Pat Cadigan (Synners), Esther Friesner (Harpy High), Mercedes Lackey (Bardic Voices), Robert Holdstock (The Bone Forest), and Gwyneth Jones, who writes young adult fiction as Ann Halam. With award-winning YA authors Jane Yolen (Wizard's Hall), and Canada's own Monica Hughes (Crisis on Conshelf Ten).
426609	"Watchmen"	November 28, 1991
Rick pays tribute to the seminal British comic book series, with Watchmen writer Alan Moore and artist Dave Gibbons.
426610	"New Worlds"	December 5, 1991
This fall sees the relaunch of New Worlds, the ground-breaking British science fiction digest which introduced such "new wave" writers as J.G. Ballard to North American readers in the 1960s. Rick interviews British writers M. John Harrison and Brian Aldiss, current New Worlds contributors Storm Constantine and Ian McDonald, past editor Michael Moorcock, and David Garnett, current editor of the series. Featuring SF editor Judith Merril, who introduced the new wave to North American readers with her anthology, England Swings SF.
426611	"Justice"	December 12, 1991
Rick looks at retribution, revenge, vigilantism and the impact of technology on justice. Featuring comic book creators Keith Giffen (writer, The Justice League), Neal Adams (artist, Batman), Denny O'Neil (writer, Batman), and artist Simon Bisley and writer Alan Grant, collaborators on Judgement at Gotham City, the Batman/Judge Dredd team-up, with speculative fiction authors Terence M. Green (Barking Dogs), Charles de Lint (The Dreaming Place) and Mercedes Lackey (The Serrated Edge series), B-movie expert Julian Grant of Sinister Cinema, and actors Michael Dorn (Worf, Star Trek: The Next Generation) and Walter Koenig (Chekov, Star Trek).
426612	"Cosmic Cavalcade"	December 19, 1991
Commander Rick's holiday show, featuring upcoming projects in the worlds of speculative fiction and comics, including: Alan Moore and Oscar Zarate's A Small Killing; Dave McKean's Cages; Stephen Baxter's Raft; computer hacker detector Clifford Stoll (The Cuckoo's Egg); splatterpunk vampire author Nancy A. Collins talking about In The Blood; new computer software; and comic book artist Alan Grant discussing Lobo's Christmas special. Rick invites viewers to send him their nominations for The Ricky's, his awards for the best in SF, fantasy and comics for 1991, with the winners to be announced in April 1992.
426613	"Covers"	January 2, 1992
Comic book artists Dave Gibbons and Dave McKean, SF artists Frank Kelly Freas and Bob Eggleton, SF art critic Jon Gustafson and Vortex Comics publisher Bill Marks debate the artistic merits of SF, fantasy and comic book covers.
426614	"Cyberpunk"	January 9, 1992
Featuring Vancouver author William Gibson, whose novel Neuromancer is widely credited with inspiring the cyberpunk movement; Bruce Sterling, editor of cyberpunk anthology Mirrorshades; SF writers Pat Cadigan, Connie Willis and Lewis Shiner (whose "Confessions of an ex-cyberpunk" was published in The New York Times last year); and Omni fiction editor Ellen Datlow, who first published Gibson.
426615	"World-Building"	January 16, 1992
How writers create the universes their works are set in, including: authors David Wingrove (the Chung Kuo series); Brian Stableford (the Asgard trilogy); John Clute; Brian Aldiss (the Helliconia series); M. John Harrison (the Viriconium series); Clive Barker (Imajica); Charles de Lint (The Little Country); Robert Jordan (the Wheel of Time series); Mercedes Lackey (the Mage Winds series).
426616	"Death"	January 23, 1992
A life-affirming look at how death is represented in speculative fiction, featuring: Douglas Adams on death and humour in the Hitch Hikers series; Batman editor Denny O'Neil on the death of Robin; Robert Holdstock on Mythago Wood; Christopher Fowler on death in horror fiction; Alberto Manguel on Edgar Allan Poe; Edward Bryant on his story "Particle Theory"; with SF writers Kristine Kathryn Rusch, Brian Stableford, Kim Newman, Swamp Thing writer Alan Moore and artist Steve Bissette, and the music video for "Superman's Song" by Winnipeg's Crash Test Dummies.
426617	"Vampires"	January 30, 1992
With acclaimed horror author Nancy Collins (Sunglasses After Dark); vampire anthologist Ellen Datlow (A Whisper of Blood); Jewelle Gomez (The Gilda Stories), who writes about lesbian vampires of colour; Canadian writers Tanya Huff (Blood Trail) and Garfield Reeves-Stevens (Bloodshift); fan extraordinaire Forrest J. Ackerman, creator of the comic character Vampirella, and Gene Colan, artist of Marvel Comics' The Tomb of Dracula. With Sinister Cinema's Julian Grant and his B-movie vampires.
426618	"Animation"	February 6, 1992
Commander Rick's guests include Steve Bingham, founder of Canada's acclaimed Alias Research, which developed the special effects software for Terminator 2; Sheridan College's animation program; Calibre Digital Design, the Brampton-based creators of such animation as the commercial inserts for the Beetlejuice animated series. Featuring the Michael Jackson video, Black or White, and a look at the National Film Board of Canada's contribution to animation.
426619	"Politics"	February 13, 1992
Politics in science fiction, fantasy and comic books, featuring: comic book writer Alan Moore and artist David Lloyd discussing V For Vendetta, with magazine editors Gardner Dozois (Isaac Asimov's Science Fiction Magazine) and Ellen Datlow (Omni Magazine); and speculative fiction writers Geoff Ryman (The Child Garden); David Wingrove (the Chung Kuo series); and Lewis Shiner (Frontera).
426620	"Profiles"	February 20, 1992
Commander Rick profiles Nebula Award-winning science fiction author Pat Murphy (The Falling Woman), Hugo Award-winning author John Brunner (Stand on Zanzibar) and World Fantasy Award-winning artist Dave McKean (for the comic book series, The Sandman).
426621	"Violence"	February 27, 1992
Commander Rick looks at the depiction of violence in science fiction, fantasy, horror and comic books, with his guests: Keith Giffen, creator of the comic character, Lobo; Alan Moore, comic book writer, Miracleman; Neil Gaiman, discussing his experiences writing Miracleman and his upcoming adaptation of Sweeney Todd; Canadian film director, David Cronenberg (Scanners; The Fly; Naked Lunch); Dan Simmons, author, Song of Kali; Brian Stableford, author, the Halcyon Drift series; Leona Gom, author, The Y Chromosome; James Morrow, author, The Wine of Violence; and Lewis Shiner, editor of When the Music's Over, an anthology of science fiction tales against war and violence.
426622	"Dinosaurs"	March 5, 1992
Featuring Robert Sawyer (author, Far-Seer); Dinosaurs! co-editor Gardner Dozois and contributor Edward Bryant ("Strata"); Michael Swanwick (author, Vacuum Flowers); James Patrick Kelly (author of the Nebula Award-nominated story "Mr. Boy"); Steve Bissette, writer/artist of the upcoming comic book, Tyrant; comic book creator Mark Schultz, writer/artist of Cadillacs and Dinosaurs and Xenozoic Tales; William Stout (artist, The Dinosaurs); paleontologist Dr. Dale Russell, curator of Fossil Vertebrates at the Canadian Museum of Nature (who takes Michael Crichton's novel, Jurassic Park, to task for paleontological inconsistencies); and Ely Kish, illustrator for Dale Russell's book, An Odyssey in Time: The Dinosaurs of North America.
426623	"Metamorphosis"	March 12, 1992
Featuring Swamp Thing writer Alan Moore and artist Steve Bissette; British author M. John Harrison and artist Ian Miller discussing their new graphic novel, The Luck in the Head; cyberpunk writer Bruce Sterling; Canadian fantasy author Charles de Lint; British authors Geoff Ryman (The Child Garden) and Kim Newman (co-editor, Horror: The 100 Best Books). Rick discusses cinematic metamorphosis with Industrial Light and Magic animator Steve Williams, Animation Supervisor for Terminator 2; Canadian film director David Cronenberg (Scanners; The Fly; Naked Lunch); and B-movie werewolves from Sinister Cinema, with the company's Canadian distributor Julian Grant.
426624	"Mars"	March 19, 1992
Commander Rick examines our fascination with Mars, featuring science fiction authors Robert J. Sawyer (End of an Era); Colin Greenland (Take Back Plenty); Terry Bisson (Voyage to the Red Planet); Kim Newman ("Famous Monsters"); Kim Stanley Robinson ("Green Mars"); Ian McDonald (Desolation Road); Michael Moorcock ("Mars"); and acclaimed SF writer Ray Bradbury, discussing his award-winning collection of short stories, The Martian Chronicles. Rick also discusses Canada's role in the space race to Mars, with Canadian Solar Sail Project director, Steve Horvath.
426625	"New Faces"	March 26, 1992
Commander Rick profiles 6 young creators to watch out for: American science fiction writer Roger MacBride Allen (Orphan of Creation); British horror author Christopher Fowler (Roofworld); British science fiction author Gwyneth Jones (Divine Endurance); comic book writer James Robinson (The Golden Age); Canadian comic book artist/writer Seth (Palookaville); and American science fiction writer Martha Soukup, discussing her 1992 Nebula Award-nominated short story, "Dog's Life".
426626	"Censorship"	April 2, 1992
Commander Rick examines the censoring of and censorship in comics and speculative fiction, with his guests: science fiction author Connie Willis discussing her short story "Ado"; fantasy author Jane Yolen; SF writer George Alec Effinger (What Entropy Means to Me); Pamela Sargent, editor of SF anthology Afterlives; Canadian film director David Cronenberg (Naked Lunch); Paul Stockton of the Comic Legends Legal Defence Fund; DC Comics editor Karen Berger; and disabled cartoonist John Callahan, whose refusal to make his controversial cartoons "politically correct" won him a Freedom of Expression award from the American Civil Liberties Union.
426627	"Genetic Engineering"	April 9, 1992
Featuring SF writers Dafydd ab Hugh (Saw Another Dead Apostle on the Rim Tonight), Gregory Benford (co-author, Beyond the Fall of Night), John Brunner (Stand on Zanzibar), Edward Bryant ("giANTS"), Lois McMaster Bujold (Falling Free), Paul di Filippo ("Cockfight"), Colin Greenland ("A Passion for Lord Pierrot"), Mercedes Lackey ("Skitty"), Spider Robinson (Starseed), Brian Stableford (Sexual Chemistry), Jack Vance (Ecce and Old Earth), and George Zebrowski (Stranger Suns).
426628	"Advice"	April 16, 1992
Commander Rick consults with creators, editors and writers about how to break into the science fiction and comic book fields, featuring authors Edward Bryant (Particle Theory), Candas Jane Dorsey (Machine Sex and Other Stories), Neil Gaiman (co-author, Good Omens), Tanya Huff (Blood Trail), Nancy Kress (Beggars in Spain), Kim Stanley Robinson ("Down and Out in the Year 2000"), Lewis Shiner (Deserted Cities of the Heart), and Dan Simmons (Summer of Night); SF editors Dorsey, Shiner, and Kathy Gale (UK's The Women's Press). From the comic book world, Rick speaks with creators Sergio Aragones (Groo the Wanderer), Gene Colan (The Tomb of Dracula), M.W. Kaluta (The Shadow), Frank Miller (Batman: The Dark Knight Returns), and Marvel editor Fabien Nicieza (Wonder Man). With Bizarro cartoonist Dan Piraro.
426629	"Ecology"	April 23, 1992
Inspired by Earth Day on April 22, Rick looks at ecology in comics and science fiction with Green Lantern/Green Arrow writer Denny O'Neil and artist Neal Adams, Swamp Thing writer Alan Moore, and authors John Brunner (The Sheep Look Up), Nancy Kress (Brain Rose), Kim Newman (co-editor, Horror: 100 Best Books), Larry Niven (co-author, Fallen Angels), Bruce Sterling (Schismatrix), and dinosaur illustrator William Stout.
426630	"Awards/Rickies"	April 30, 1992
Commander Rick announces the results of the Rickies, his contest for the best of 1991, featuring authors Clive Barker (Imajica), Gregory Benford (Beyond the Fall of Night), Lois McMaster Bujold (Barrayar), Neil Gaiman (co-author, Good Omens), Tanya Huff (Blood Price), Nancy Kress (Brain Rose), James Morrow (Daughter Earth), Garfield Reeves-Stevens (Dark Matter), and comic book creators Will Eisner (To the Heart of the Storm), Alan Moore (Watchmen) and Neil Gaiman, once again, for The Sandman.

=== Season 4 ===
No.	Title	Original release date
471001	"First Contact"	October 1, 1992
E.T.'s phone home – S.E.T.I. is listening! The Search for Extra-Terrestrial Intelligence is the topic under discussion this week on Prisoners of Gravity. Commander Rick talks with several of the contributors to the speculative science fact book First Contact, including co-editor Ben Bova and contributing authors Hal Clement ("Alternative Life Designs") and David Brin ("Mystery of the Great Silence"). With SF authors J. Brian Clarke (The Expediter), Larry Niven (The Mote in God's Eye), Robert J. Sawyer (Far-Seer), magazine editor Charles Ryan (Aboriginal Science Fiction), comic book writer D. Larry Hancock (The Silent Invasion) and filmmaker Dan Curtis. Dan discusses the UFO believers in his documentary, In Advance of the Landing.
471002	"Fans"	October 8, 1992
Walter Koenig (Chekov) and Michael Dorn (Worf) bring a Star Trek perspective to this week's show as SF authors Douglas Adams (The Hitch Hiker's Guide to the Galaxy), Lois McMaster Bujold (Barrayar), Spider Robinson (Time Travelers Strictly Cash) and comic book creators Dave Gibbons (Watchmen), Garth Ennis (Hellblazer) and Neil Gaiman (Sandman) provide the anecdotes, and Julius Schwartz and Forrest J. Ackerman explore the history, as Commander Rick examines the phenomenon of fandom. Harlan Ellison (The Essential Ellison) is his usual acerbic self as he enlightens Rick on the dark side of fandom.
471003	"Outlaws"	October 15, 1992
Commander Rick looks at why outlaws and rebels are such appealing characters in science fiction and comic books, featuring writers Andre Norton (the Witch World series); Monica Hughes (the Isis Trilogy); Nancy Holder ("Robin's Witch" in The Fantastic Adventures of Robin Hood); Charles de Lint (Jack, the Giant-Killer); S.N. Lewitt (Cybernetic Jungle); Mirrorshades editor Bruce Sterling (author, The Hacker Crackdown) with Mirrorshades contributors Pat Cadigan ("Rock On"), Lewis Shiner ("Till Human Voices Wake Us"), Paul de Filippo ("Stone Lives") and William Gibson ("The Gernsback Continuum"); plus Robert Silverberg ("The Pardoner's Tale") and Mike Resnick (editor, Alternate Outlaws), with comic book creators Denny O'Neil (writer/editor, Batman) and Peter David (The Incredible Hulk).
471004	"Ray Bradbury"	October 22, 1992
Commander Rick pays tribute to science fiction writer Ray Bradbury, ground-breaking author of such timeless works as The Martian Chronicles. In addition to an extensive interview with Bradbury, Rick talks to Bradbury's first agent, Julius Schwartz, to examine his early career. Author Robert J. Sawyer and author/editor Ben Bova discuss Bradbury's influence on the science fiction field. Rick also examines the latest project to celebrate his work, the comic book series The Ray Bradbury Chronicles, featuring interviews with contributing artists Dave Gibbons and P. Craig Russell.
471005	"Madness"	October 29, 1992
Commander Rick captures the Hallowe'en spirit by exploring the allure of madness in science fiction and comics, with guests including speculative fiction authors Maya Kaathryn Bohnhoff ("A Tear in the Mind's Eye"), Doris Lessing (Briefing for a Descent into Hell), James Morrow (This Is the Way the World Ends) and Steven Gould ("Peaches for Mad Molly"). Peter David discusses his mad Star Fleet Commander, Quentin Stone (A Rock and a Hard Place) and how Multiple Personality Disorder affects The Incredible Hulk. Also from the world of comics: Mike Baron (The Badger), Michael D. Allred (Madman), Alan Grant (Judge Dredd), Pete Milligan (Shade, the Changing Man) and Dave Gibbons (Watchmen).
471006	"Space Travel"	November 5, 1992
Commander Rick examines both the fictional and real world future of space travel with his guests J. Brian Clarke (The Expediter), Hal Clement (Cycle of Fire), James Patrick Kelly ("The Propagation of Light in a Vacuum"), Robert J. Sawyer (Golden Fleece) and Bob Shaw (The Ragged Astronauts). As well, Iain M. Banks discusses the importance of naming spaceships, Ray Bradbury waxes poetic on his first visit to a NASA launch, and Bruce Sterling, Ben Bova and Jerry Pournelle square off to debate the importance of putting people in space rather than machines.
471007	"The City"	November 12, 1992
How does the city affect the characters who live there and the way a story is told is the question Commander Rick answers tonight with the help of comic book creators Will Eisner (Invisible People), Peter Kuper (New York City), Alan Grant (Judge Dredd), and Dave Gibbons (Watchmen), and speculative fiction writers: Discworld creator Terry Pratchett discusses designing a fantasy city (Small Gods), Mary Gentle (The Architecture of Desire) and James Patrick Kelly (Look Into the Sun) discuss the use of architecture in fiction, while William Gibson ("The Gernsback Continuum") discusses his future metropolises and Michael Moorcock (The Dreaming City) talks about dodging bullets in L.A.
471008	"Sex"	November 26, 1992
Madonna has nothing on Commander Rick, who looks at the role of sex in speculative fiction and comics, featuring SF authors Ben Bova (Mars), Spider Robinson (co-author, Starseed), Lisa Tuttle ("In Translation"), James Morrow (This Is The Way The World Ends), Lesley Choyce (editor, Ark of Ice), and Omni magazine's SF editor Ellen Datlow, talking about her erotic SF and horror anthologies, Alien Sex and Blood and Roses; and from comics, writer Alan Moore and artist Melinda Gebbi discuss their collaborative erotic comic, "Lost Girls", and writer/artist Aline Kominsky-Crumb (Love That Bunch) discusses how sex has shaped her own work.
471009	"Time Travel"	December 3, 1992
Commander Rick examines the use of time travel in science fiction, with SF authors Connie Willis (discussing her latest novel, Doomsday Book), L. Sprague de Camp (Lest Darkness Fall), Michael Moorcock (Behold the Man), Gregory Benford (Timescape), John Gribbin ("Don't Look Back"), Robert Silverberg (co-author with Isaac Asimov of The Ugly Little Boy), Spider Robinson (Time Travelers Strictly Cash), Geoffrey A. Landis ("Ripples in the Dirac Sea") and Joe Haldeman ("The Hemingway Hoax").
471010	"Shared Worlds"	December 10, 1992
Commander Rick examines the shared world concept in science fiction and comics with a special look at some of the most popular multi-author books available. James Morrow (contributor to the What Might Have Been series), points out the difference between shared worlds and theme anthologies. George R.R. Martin discusses the incredibly popular Wild Card series which he created and edits. C.J. Cherryh discusses writing for Thieves' World, Heroes in Hell and creating her own shared world in Merovingen Nights. Neil Gaiman discusses designing shared worlds (Temps, The Weerde and Villains) and working within the DC Comics universe (The Sandman). Rick examines the shared universe at Marvel Comics with X-Men contributors Fabian Nicieza, Walt Simonson and John Byrne. The Star Trek universe is scrutinized by contributing authors Peter David, Garfield and Judith Reeves-Stevens and J. M. Dillard. And finally, Harlan Ellison, creator of the ground-breaking shared world Medea, gives his thoughts on the proliferation of shared world projects.
471011	"Medea/Murasaki"	December 17, 1992
Commander Rick looks at Medea, the most influential and innovative shared world anthology in science fiction, with creator Harlan Ellison, artist Frank Kelly Freas, and contributing authors Kate Wilhelm, Robert Silverberg, Frederik Pohl, and Jack Williamson. He then looks at Silverberg's recent shared world anthology, Murasaki, which was inspired by Ellison's Medea, with contributors David Brin, Gregory Benford and Nancy Kress.
471013	"Jack Kirby"	January 7, 1993
This week's episode of Prisoners of Gravity pays tribute to Jack Kirby, the man whose dynamic art style redefined superhero comics when he co-created Captain America in 1941. In the early 1960s Jack Kirby and Stan Lee created The Fantastic Four, The Incredible Hulk and Thor – characters who now form the core of the Marvel Comics Universe. Kirby and his work are praised by Will Eisner, creator of The Spirit; Walt Simonson, the writer/artist who inherited Thor and The Fantastic Four at Marvel Comics; and Scott McCloud, writer/artist of Zot! Also featuring comic book creators Max Allan Collins (writer, Ms. Tree), Kevin Eastman (co-creator, The Teenage Mutant Ninja Turtles), Len Wein (writer, The Uncanny X-Men), Dave Gibbons (artist, Watchmen), with Canadian fantasy writer Charles de Lint (Spiritwalk) and science fiction writer Samuel R. Delany (Dhalgren).
471014	"Weapons"	January 14, 1993
Commander Rick examines the role of weapons in genre fiction, from magic swords to portable nuclear weapons, featuring writers Terry Pratchett (the Discworld series), Iain M. Banks (Use of Weapons), Lois McMaster Bujold (Barrayar), and Michael Moorcock (the Elric series), Warren Murphy (co-author, The Destroyer series), Sean Stewart (Passion Play), Walter Jon Williams (Voice of the Whirlwind), Jerry Pournelle (creator, There Will Be War series), Shirley Meier (co-author, Saber and Shadow), with comic book creators Kevin Eastman (co-creator, The Teenage Mutant Ninja Turtles), M.W. Kaluta (artist, The Shadow), and Mike Baron (artist, The Punisher).
471015	"Information"	January 21, 1993
PRISONERS OF GRAVITY'S 100TH SHOW! As we enter the Information Age, science fiction grapples with the effect of this new culture. Commander Rick interviews the ever-controversial Timothy Leary, plus science fiction writers Douglas Adams (Mostly Harmless), Bruce Sterling (Islands in the Net), Robert J. Sawyer (Golden Fleece), John Brunner (Stand on Zanzibar), David Brin (Earth), George Zebrowski (Stranger Suns), and Martha Soukup (Rosemary's Brain). The Commander also looks at the impact of information on society with Clifford Stoll (The Cuckoo's Egg), the first person to track down and catch a computer hacker; Bill McKibben (The Age of Missing Information); and Paul Wollaston from Apple Computers.
471012	"Awards"	January 28, 1993
Commander Rick discusses awards with the award-winners: science fiction writers John Brunner, Samuel R. Delany, Harlan Ellison, William Gibson, Joe Haldeman, Nancy Kress, James Morrow, Jerry Pournelle, Kristine Kathryn Rusch, and Lisa Tuttle, the only writer to ever decline the Nebula Award (for her story, "The Bone Flute"), plus writer Neil Gaiman, mystery author Sharyn McCrumb, and comic book artist Dave Gibbons.
471016	"Mystery/SF"	February 4, 1993
Commander Rick examines the cross-over between the mystery and science fiction genres, featuring renowned British author, P.D. James, whose latest book, The Children of Men, is set in a futuristic world in which men have become sterile. Rick also chats with science fiction writers John E. Stith (Redshift Rendezvous), Sean Stewart (Passion Play), Vernor Vinge (Marooned in Realtime), Martin H. Greenberg (editor of numerous SF and mystery anthologies), Maxim Jakubowski (SF and mystery writer), Garfield and Judith Reeves-Stevens (The Chronicles of Galen Sword) and mystery writer Sharyn McCrumb, whose Edgar Award-winning 1988 mystery, Bimbos of the Death Sun, was set at a science fiction convention. Editor Mike Resnick discusses his mystery/science fiction crossover Whatdunits anthologies, and contributing authors Beth Meacham and Jane Yolen discuss their stories.
471017	"Racism"	February 18, 1993
TIE-IN TO CANADIAN BLACK HISTORY MONTH, FEB. 1993. Commander Rick looks at how racism is handled in comic books and speculative fiction, featuring writers Samuel R. Delany, the first Black science fiction writer and winner of the Nebula Award (for his novel, Babel-17); African-American writer Jewelle Gomez (The Gilda Stories); Native American writer Owl Goingback; Asian-American science fiction writer William F. Wu; science fiction writer Karen Haber discussing the mutant as a metaphor for racism; and SF author Spider Robinson (co-author, Starseed); and renowned fantasist Andre Norton. Commander Rick looks at racism in comic books with writer/artist Will Eisner (creator, The Spirit) whose latest graphic novel, To The Heart of the Storm, deals with issues of anti-Semitism during the Second World War; Black comic book artist Denys Cowan discusses Milestone comics, the new multicultural imprint he's directing for DC Comics; Louise Simonson (writer, Superman: The Man of Steel) discusses racism at The Daily Planet; Gilbert Hernandez (co-creator, Love and Rockets). Cartoonist Dan Piraro (Bizarro) also puts in an appearance.
471018	"Profiles"	February 25, 1993
Commander Rick profiles three innovative creators: Jeff Smith, creator of the charming comic book series, Bone; best-selling Canadian fantasy author Guy Gavriel Kay, A Song for Arbonne; and Quebec science fiction writer Élisabeth Vonarburg, In the Mothers' Land.
471019	"Cyberbook"	March 4, 1993
TIE-IN TO FREEDOM TO READ WEEK (MAR. 1–8, 1993). Commander Rick looks at the future of electronic books and the impact of new technologies on reading and literature. Guests include science fiction writers Douglas Adams (The Hitch Hiker's Guide to the Galaxy), Clive Barker (The Thief of Always), Michael Moorcock (The Revenge of the Rose), and Ben Bova (Cyberbook), Pat Cadigan (Synners), and comic book creators Sergio Aragones (artist, Mad Magazine), John Byrne (The Next Men), and Carl Lieberman, creator of the computerized version of the Canadian comic book series, Mr. X. Also featuring Paul Wollaston of Apple Computers and John Lowry of Discis Software.
471020	"Immortality"	March 11, 1993
The pros and cons of living forever are examined this week, with Anne Rice, author of the best-selling Vampire Chronicles (discussing her latest, The Tale of the Body Thief), and horror writer Clive Barker (The Thief of Always). Other guests include science fiction writers Larry Niven (Ringworld), Joan D. Vinge (The Snow Queen), Spider Robinson (Time Pressure), Joe Haldeman (Buying Time), Ian MacDonald (The Broken Land), Vernor Vinge (Marooned in Realtime), Brian Stableford ("The Magic Bullet"), and Gregory Benford ("Doing Lennon"). With comic book creators Neil Gaiman (writer, The Sandman), Len Wein (creator/writer, Swamp Thing) and Peter David (writer, The Incredible Hulk).
471021	"Utopia"	March 18, 1993
Featuring authors Clive Barker (The Thief of Always), Bruce Sterling (co-author, The Difference Engine), Samuel R. Delany (Triton), James Morrow (City of Truth), Geoff Ryman (The Child Garden), Iain Banks (Consider Phlebas), Sean Stewart (Passion Play), Kim Stanley Robinson, whose novel Pacific Edge is regarded as the premier modern utopia novel, plus the writers of the comic book, Miracleman, Alan Moore and Neil Gaiman, with the comic book's artist, Mark Buckingham.
471022	"Computer Games"	March 25, 1993
Rick discusses computer games with science fiction writer Douglas Adams, whose book, The Hitch Hiker's Guide to the Galaxy, has been adapted into a computer game; author Frederik Pohl discusses the interactive computer version of his science fiction novel, Gateway; and comic book artist Dave Gibbons talks about Beneath A Steel Sky, the interactive computer game he's working on. Also beaming aboard Reality 1 are creators from the computer gaming companies Psygnosis (Jerry Wolosenko, president) and Sierra On-Line (Roberta Williams, creator of the game "King's Quest", Andy Hoyos, art designer, and Mark Siebert, music designer).
471023	"Crime and Punishment"	April 1, 1993
Featuring "the Queen of Crime Fiction", P.D. James, discussing her latest novel, The Children of Men, plus science fiction writers Sean Stewart (Passion Play), David Brin (Earth), Lois McMaster Bujold (Falling Free), Walter Jon Williams ("Prayers on the Wind"), James Patrick Kelly ("Death Therapy"), Roger MacBride Allen (The Modular Man), Michael G. Coney (The Jaws That Bite, The Claws That Catch), and Garfield and Judith Reeves-Stevens (Second Nature). Rick also interviews John Byrne (artist, The Uncanny X-Men), Matt Wagner (writer, Sandman Mystery Theater), and M.W. Kaluta (artist, The Shadow), about crime and punishment in the world of comic books.
471024	"God"	April 8, 1993
The Commander's guests include science fiction author and critic Harlan Ellison; Terry Pratchett, author of Small Gods, the latest novel in his best-selling Discworld series; James Morrow talking about his upcoming book, Towing Jehovah; Spider Robinson (author, Time Pressure); Donald Westlake (author, Humans); and Connie Willis (author, Doomsday Book). Rick also discusses the Islamic interpretation of God's will with Salman Rushdie. Rick also talks to Douglas Adams, author of Mostly Harmless, Clive Barker, author of Imajica, and Brian Stableford, author of Journey to the Centre who discusses the atheism of science fiction.
471025	"Autobiography"	April 15, 1993
Commander Rick examines how and why creators put themselves into their stories. Featuring comic book creators Will Eisner (writer/artist, To the Heart of The Storm), Barry Windsor-Smith (artist, Conan the Barbarian), Neil Gaiman (writer, The Sandman), plus independent comic book creators Aline Kominsky-Crumb (Love That Bunch), Seth (Palooka-ville), Joe Matt (Peep Show), Chester Brown (Yummy Fur), Daniel Clowes (Eightball), plus science fiction author Samuel R. Delany (The Einstein Intersection), fantasy writers Michael Moorcock (Elric of Melnibone) and Michael Coney (Pallahaxi Tide), and horror author Anne Rice (discussing her latest novel in her best-selling vampire series, The Tale of the Body Thief).
471026	"Ecology"	April 22, 1993
Commander Rick examines the impact of over-population, and the Zero Population Growth movement, on current ecological concerns. Featured guests include science fiction writers David Brin discussing his near future novel, Earth; Frederik Pohl, co-author (with Isaac Asimov) of the non-fiction ecology book, Our Angry Earth; Kim Stanley Robinson (Pacific Edge); Joe Haldeman (The Forever War); Jerry Pournelle (co-author, The Mote in God's Eye); Barry B. Longyear (Sea of Glass); and comic creator Paul Chadwick (writer/artist, Concrete).
471027	"Creators' Rights"	May 6, 1993
Commander Rick examines the ownership that creators have over their creations, featuring science fiction author Harlan Ellison, who sued the producers of the film, The Terminator, for appropriating his Outer Limits teleplay, "Soldier"; plus comic book creators Scott McCloud (writer/artist, Zot!); Will Eisner (Creator, The Spirit); Neal Adams (artist, Batman); Len Wein (creator, Swamp Thing); Dale Keown (creator/artist, Pitt); Kevin Eastman (co-creator, The Teenage Mutant Ninja Turtles); and Dave Sim (creator, Cerebus).

=== Season 5 ===
No.	Title	Original release date
522801	October 6, 1993	
What are the biggest challenges of living in space? What are the dangers? And what are the benefits? Commander Rick checks in with science fiction authors Geoffrey A. Landis ("A Walk in the Sun"), Michael Skeet ("Breaking Ball"), Frederik Pohl (Mining The Oort), Ben Bova (Mars), Spider and Jeanne Robinson (Starseed), C.J. Cherryh (Heavy Time), Bruce Sterling (Schismatrix), and Michael Swanwick (Griffin's Egg). As well, Nichelle Nichols (Lt. Uhura on Star Trek) discusses her work for NASA's space shuttle astronaut recruitment programme, and Dr. Roberta Bondar, Canada's first female astronaut, tells Rick about some of the medical problems of living in weightlessness.
522802	"Quest"	October 13, 1993
Commander Rick examines the mythic quest, and why this kind of story has been so popular throughout the ages. Featuring authors: Robert Silverberg (Lord Valentine's Castle), Michael Moorcock (Elric of Melnibone), Clive Barker (The Thief of Always), Charles de Lint (Jack, the Giant-Killer), Maya Kaathryn Bohnhoff (The Meri), Sean Stewart (Nobody's Son), Lucius Shepard (Life During Wartime), Greg Bear (Anvil of Stars), Connie Willis (Doomsday Book), Geoff Ryman (Was), plus comic book creators Jack Kirby (co-creator/artist, The Fantastic Four) and Neil Gaiman (writer, The Sandman).
522803	"The Sandman"	October 20, 1993
This week Commander Rick profiles the comic book series that everyone from Norman Mailer to the girl next door is reading – The Sandman. Featuring the key creators who've worked on The Sandman: writer Neil Gaiman, editor Karen Berger, cover artist Dave McKean, and story artists Charles Vess, P. Craig Russell, Jill Thompson, Mike Dringenberg and Kelley Jones. Plus, a glowing tribute from science fiction writer Harlan Ellison, who wrote the introduction to the Sandman graphic novel, Season Of Mists.
522804	"The Devil"	October 27, 1993
Commander Rick presents a devilishly scary show about the Prince of Darkness and his appearances in comics, speculative fiction and horror. With Stan Lee (writer, The Silver Surfer), Neil Gaiman (writer, The Sandman), Garth Ennis (writer, Hellblazer) and Jim Woodring (writer/artist, "Frank's Faux Pa") as well as horror writers Clive Barker (The Damnation Game) and Kim Antieau ("Maculate Conception"). Plus, speculative fiction authors Harlan Ellison ("The Whimper Of Whipped Dogs"), James Morrow (Only Begotten Daughter), Greg Bear ("Dead Run") and Parke Godwin (Waiting for the Galactic Bus). One hell of a good show!
522805	"Games"	November 3, 1993
Let the games begin! This week Commander Rick examines how SF authors have used the games people play to add another dimension to their stories. Poul Anderson ("The Immortal Game"), Greg Bear (Anvil of Stars) and John Brunner (The Squares of the City) all discuss their use of chess as a metaphor while Kristine Kathryn Rusch a.k.a. Sandy Schofield (co-author of the Deep Space Nine novel, The Big Game) looks at the importance of poker in the Star Trek universe. Plus Iain M. Banks (The Player of Games), David Brin (Glory Season), Nancy Kress ("Touchdown"), Terry Pratchett (Small Gods) and cartoonist Lynda Barry (Come Over, Come Over). As well the Commander checks out the role-playing game phenomenon with the help of authors Sean Stewart (Nobody's Son) and Steven Barnes (co-author, Dream Park), David Pringle, editor, Games Workshop Books and Pierre Savoie, of the Committee for the Advancement of Role-Playing Games.
522806	"Writers' Workshops/Clarion"	November 10, 1993
Commander Rick gets some very helpful advice on how to become a better writer from six instructors and four graduates of Clarion, the premiere writers' workshops for science fiction and fantasy writers. The instructors include Clarion co-founders, science fiction authors Damon Knight (Creating Short Fiction) and Kate Wilhelm (Death Qualified), Harlan Ellison (The Essential Ellison), Kristine Kathryn Rusch (editor, The Magazine of Fantasy and Science Fiction), Geoff Ryman (Was) and Connie Willis (Doomsday Book). The former students include writers Kim Antieau ("The Mark of the Beast"), James Alan Gardner ("The Reckoning Of Gifts"), Nina Kiriki Hoffman ("Savage Breasts") and William F. Wu ("Hong's Lost and Found Emporium").
522807	"Tolkien"	November 24, 1993
The continuing influence of J.R.R. Tolkien and his trilogy, The Lord of the Rings, is celebrated this week as Commander Rick checks in with comic book creators Mike Ploog (artist, Weirdworld), Walt Simonson (writer/artist, Thor) and Charles Vess (artist, Books Of Magic – issue 3). On the speculative fiction side of things Rick chats with Guy Gavriel Kay, who, along with Tolkien's son Christopher, completed Tolkien's last manuscript, The Silmarillion, Diana L. Paxson (The Wolf and the Raven), Sean Stewart (Nobody's Son), Martin H. Greenberg, editor of the Tolkien tribute anthology, After The King, plus After The King contributors Charles de Lint ("The Conjure Man") and Terry Pratchett ("Troll Bridge").As well, writers Suzy McKee Charnas (The Kingdom of Kevin Malone), Carole Nelson Douglas (Counter-Probe), and Chelsea Quinn Yarbro (Better in the Dark) point out that The Lord of the Rings is far from perfect. Tolkien, warts and all, this week.
522808	"Medicine and Nanotechnology"	December 1, 1993
Commander Rick is feeling under the weather this week and so decides to investigate the future of medicine with science fiction authors Frederik Pohl (Gateway), Nancy Kress ("The Mountain to Mohammed"), and science fact writer Joel Davis, whose book, Mapping The Code, explores the Human Genome Project. Then Rick examines nanotechnology—the building of cell-sized machines that practice medicine from inside the human body—with Steven Barnes (co-author, The Barsoom Project), Tony Daniel (Warpath), Ian McDonald (Necroville), Michael Skeet ("Relics"), Dave Smeds ("Suicidal Tendencies"), John Clute (co-editor, The Encyclopedia of Science Fiction), and Greg Bear (Blood Music), the first SF author to explore this new frontier.
522809	"Memory"	December 8, 1993
How much of "who we are" is the result of memory? Commander Rick examines the role of memory in speculative fiction and comic books this week with the help of SF authors Brian W. Aldiss (Bury My Heart at W.H. Smith's), Edward Bryant ("Particle Theory"), Harlan Ellison ("Mefisto in Onyx"), Iain M. Banks (Use Of Weapons), Harry Harrison (The Turing Option), Howard V. Hendrix ("The Voice of the Dolphin in Air"), and William Gibson (Neuromancer). As well, how childhood memories shape fiction is discussed with comic book creators Lynda Barry (Ernie Pook's Comeek), Neil Gaiman and Dave McKean (Violent Cases) and SF author Michael Moorcock (The Dreaming City). Part 2 next week ...
522810	"Amnesia/Total Recall"	December 15, 1993
This week Commander Rick continues to explore the theme of memory since he completely forgot to talk about amnesia in the last show. Joining him this time around are film director and screenwriter David Cronenberg – who was the original choice to write and direct the movie Total Recall, and speculative fiction authors Walter Jon Williams (Voice of the Whirlwind), C.J. Cherryh (Heavy Time), Harry Harrison (The Turing Option), Pat Cadigan (Fools), Nancy Kress (Brain Rose), Kim Antieau ("Another Country") and Samuel R. Delany (Dhalgren). In addition Rick looks at the idea of eidetic or photographic memory with the assistance of Ray Bradbury (The Illustrated Man), Megan Lindholm (Alien Earth) and Terry Pratchett (Small Gods).
522811	"Alter Ego"	December 22, 1993
Who is the man behind the mask? Commander Rick investigates the comic book tradition of the Alter Ego with his guests Bob Kane (creator of Batman), Stan Lee (co-creator of Spider-man), Jack Kirby (co-creator of Captain America), Julius Schwartz (editor, Superman 1971–1986), Neal Adams (artist, Batman), Ty Templeton (artist, The Batman Adventures), Steve Perry (writer Batman: The Animated Series), Frank Miller (writer/artist, Batman: The Dark Knight Returns), Alan Grant (writer, Batman: Knightfall), Scott McCloud (writer/artist, Understanding Comics), Dave Gibbons (artist, Watchmen) and Howard Chaykin (writer/artist, American Flagg).
522812	"Post-Apocalypse"	January 12, 1994
It's the end of the world as we know it ... so this week Commander Rick investigates science fiction's fascination with the Post-Apocalypse story. David Brin (The Postman), Roger Zelazny (Damnation Alley), Suzy McKee Charnas (Walk to the End of the World), Howard V. Hendrix ("In The Smoke") and James Morrow (This Is The Way The World Ends) all blow up the world while P.D. James (The Children Of Men), Pat Murphy (The City Not Long After) and Connie Willis (Doomsday Book) prefer the plague to the bomb. Plus, Rick checks in with editor Martin H. Greenberg and author Robert Sheckley about their contributions to the anthology Beyond Armageddon. This show is so good, you'll want to stay until The End!
522813	"Telepathy"	January 19, 1994
I know what you're thinking – "Why do a show on Telepathy?" Commander Rick answers that question with some help from Nick Bantock, the acclaimed author of the Griffin And Sabine trilogy. You'll also hear from speculative fiction authors Frank M. Robinson (The Dark Beyond The Stars), Dan Simmons (The Hollow Man), Larry Niven (The Mote in God's Eye), Karen Haber (Mutant Legacy), Robert Silverberg (Dying Inside), Harlan Ellison ("Broken Glass"), Howard V. Hendrix ("Singing The Mountain to the Stars"), Spider Robinson (Telempath) and Marion Zimmer Bradley (The Darkover series). Plus, Star Trek: The Next Generation author Peter David (Imzadi) disusses the telepathic powers of Deanna Troi.
522814	"Homosexuality"	January 26, 1994
Commander Rick examines the portrayal of gay and lesbian characters in comics and speculative fiction. John Byrne reveals why he included a gay superhero (Northstar) when he created the Alpha Flight team for Marvel Comics. Roberta Gregory, the first openly lesbian comics creator discusses her comic book series, Naughty Bits. From the world of speculative fiction Rick checks in with Samuel R. Delany (Dhalgren), Greg Bear (Tangents) and two recipients of the Lambda Award (presented for excellence in the portrayal of gay characters) Jewelle Gomez (The Gilda Stories) and Maureen F. McHugh (China Mountain Zhang). As well, the members of Control—the secret organization that regularly provide Rick with video footage gathered at science fiction conventions around the world—talk to authors Frank M. Robinson (Lambda Award winner for The Dark Beyond The Stars), Melissa Scott (Lambda Award finalist for Dreamships), Jane Yolen (Briar Rose) and Ellen Kushner (Swordspoint). **Note: We are repeating last season's tribute to Jack Kirby in honour of his death on Feb. 5.; 522615 will be aired on April 27 at the end of the season.
471013	"Jack Kirby"	February 16, 1994
This week's episode of Prisoners of Gravity pays tribute to Jack Kirby, the man whose dynamic art style redefined superhero comics when he co-created Captain America in 1941. In the early 1960s Jack Kirby and Stan Lee created The Fantastic Four, The Incredible Hulk and Thor – characters who now form the core of the Marvel Comics Universe. Kirby and his work are praised by Will Eisner, creator of The Spirit; Walt Simonson, the writer/artist who inherited Thor and The Fantastic Four at Marvel Comics; and Scott McCloud, writer/artist of Zot! Also featuring comic book creators Max Allan Collins (writer, Ms. Tree), Kevin Eastman (co-creator, The Teenage Mutant Ninja Turtles), Len Wein (writer, The Uncanny X-Men), Dave Gibbons (artist, Watchmen), with Canadian fantasy writer Charles de Lint (Spiritwalk) and science fiction writer Samuel R. Delany (Dhalgren).
522816	"Monsters"	February 23, 1994
Why are we fascinated by monsters? This is the question Commander Rick attempts to answer with the capable assistance of such notable monster creators as Clive Barker (The Thief Of Always), Peter Straub (The Throat), Melanie Tem (co-author: Making Love), Brian Aldiss (Frankenstein Unbound) and Robert Sheckley ("Ghost V"). And from the realm of comics, Mike Mignola (creator/artist: Hellboy), Steve Bissette (editor: Taboo), Jamie Delano (writer: Hellblazer), Len Wein (co-creator/writer: Swamp Thing), Stan Lee (co-creator/writer The Incredible Hulk) and Frank Miller (writer/artist Sin City).
522817	"Virtual Reality"	March 2, 1994
Virtually everyone will want to watch Prisoners Of Gravity this week for a reality check on virtual reality. Commander Rick gets the low down from Larry Niven and Steven Barnes (co-authors of the Dream Park series), Douglas Adams (The Hitchhiker's Guide to the Galaxy), Neal Stephenson (Snowcrash), William Gibson (Neuromancer), Greg Bear (Moving Mars), James Patrick Kelly ("Mr. Boy"). Rick also talks with nonfiction writers Donald A. Norman (Things That Make Us Smart) and Bill McKibben (The Age Of Missing Information) and virtual reality pioneer and guru Jaron Lanier.
522818	"Fairy Tales"	March 9, 1994
Once Upon A Time, there was a wonderful episode of Prisoners Of Gravity all about Fairy Tales. The handsome prince, Commander Rick, decided to learn all there was to know about the mysterious people who create these marvelous stories. And so with the help of his magical computer Nan-Cy, Rick spoke to the wisest people on the land – artist Charles Vess (Little Red Riding Hood), and authors Clive Barker (The Thief Of Always), Chelsea Quinn Yarbro ("Cinderella's Revenge"), Peter Straub (The Throat), Anne Rice (The Claiming Of Sleeping Beauty), Jane Yolen (Briar Rose), Nancy Kress ("Stalking Beans"), Neil Gaiman ("Troll Bridge") and Terri Windling (co-editor, Snow White, Blood Red). And they all lived happily ever after ... except for the prince, who was still stuck in space.
522819	"Vampires"	March 16, 1994
This week Commander Rick talks to the women who are at the heart of the resurrection of the vampire legend. Anne Rice (The Tale of the Body Thief) discusses the difference between her creations This week Commander Rick talks to the women who are at the hand the 19th century version of the vampire. Rick also chats with authors Poppy Z. Brite (Lost Souls), Nancy Collins (Sunglasses After Dark), Nancy Baker (The Night Inside), Chelsea Quinn Yarbro (Better in the Dark), Suzy McKee Charnas (The Vampire Tapestry), Jewelle Gomez (The Gilda Stories) and Tanya Huff (Blood Price). Once again, Rick has his finger on the pulse of popular fiction!
522820	"Vietnam"	March 23, 1994
Twenty years after America pulled out of Vietnam, that war is still a major theme in North American culture. So this week Commander Rick, N.C.O. (Non-Commissioned Orbiter) goes "in country" to examine the influence 'Nam has had on comics and SF. With Archie Goodwin (editor/writer: Blazing Combat), George Pratt (writer/artist: Enemy Ace), Peter Straub (The Throat), Lois McMaster Bujold (Shards Of Honor), Carol Severance (Demon Drums), Lucius Shepard (Life During Wartime), Dave Smeds ("Goats" in In The Field Of Fire) and Joe Haldeman (The Forever War)
522821	"Aliens"	March 30, 1994
What does a Martian really look like? What sort of creature would we meet on the planet Medea? Commander Rick finds out this week as he talks with some of the foremost designers of alien creatures in science fiction: Nancy Kress (An Alien Light), George R.R. Martin ("Sandkings"), Robert J. Sawyer (Foreigner), Greg Bear (Anvil Of Stars), Poul Anderson ("The Sharing Of Flesh"), Hal Clement (Mission Of Gravity), William Stout (preliminary design work on The Predator), Kelley Jones (artist: Alien: Hive), Steve Perry (Aliens: Earth Hive), Kevin O'Donnell, Jr. (Fire On The Border) and Larry Niven (Ringworld).
522822	"Sexism and Feminism"	April 6, 1994
Science Fiction and Comics have long been criticized for their portrayal of female characters, but a growing number of creators in both of these genres are out to change that situation. Commander Rick checks in with Trina Robbins (A Century Of Women Cartoonists), Colleen Doran (writer/artist: A Distant Soil), Jill Thompson (artist: Black Orchid), Andre Norton (Ordeal In Otherwhere), Lisa Tuttle ("Husbands"), Martha Soukup ("The Story So Far"), Pat Murphy (The Falling Woman), Chelsea Quinn Yarbro (Better In The Dark), David Brin (Glory Season), Samuel R. Delany (Triton) and Suzy McKee Charnas (Walk To The End Of The World). Plus Rick gets the scoop on the Barbie Liberation Organization.
522823	"Comic Book Layout"	April 13, 1994
Commander Rick takes an inside look at the craft of Comics with some of the foremost craftsmen in the genre. Featuring Stan Lee (How To Draw Comics The Marvel Way), Will Eisner (writer/artist: The Spirit), Mike Ploog (artist: Weirdworld), Joe Kubert (artist: Enemy Ace), Scott McCloud (writer/artist: Understanding Comics), Alan Moore (writer: Watchmen), Dave Gibbons (artist: Watchmen), Howard Chaykin (writer/artist: American Flagg!), Denys Cowan (artist: Hardware) and Frank Miller (writer/artist: Sin City).
522824	"The Brain and Artificial Intelligence"	April 20, 1994
Commander Rick has been thinking about thinking, so this week he delves into the workings of the human brain and the explores the frontiers of computer intelligence with Timothy Leary, artificial intelligence pioneer Marvin Minsky who appears via his electronic book The Society Of Mind and SF authors Greg Bear (Queen Of Angels), Vernor Vinge (A Fire Upon The Deep), Frederik Pohl (Jem), Harry Harrison (co-author (with Marvin Minsky The Turing Option), Jack Williamson ("The Metal Man"), Jerry Oltion (Isaac Asimov's Robot City, No. 6 Humanity), John Brunner (A Maze Of Stars), Amy Thomson (Virtual Girl), Roger Zelazny ("Home Is The Hangman") and Robert J. Sawyer (Golden Fleece). Plus Rick checks in with non-fiction authors Howard Rheingold (The Virtual Community) and Donald A. Norman (Things That Make Us Smart).
522815	"Evolution"	April 27, 1994
Evolution isn't just a thing of the past, in science fiction evolution asks, "Where do we go from here?" And to find out, this week Commander Rick talks with science fiction authors Connie Willis (Impossible Things), Douglas Adams (Last Chance To See), Michael Swanwick ("Griffin's Egg"), John Brunner (Stand On Zanzibar), Bruce Sterling (Schizmatrix), Walter Jon Williams ("Dinosaurs") and Robert J. Sawyer (Fossil Hunter). Rick also chats with world-renowned anthropologist, paleontologist and author Dr. Richard Leakey (The Making of Mankind) and nonfiction author Joel Davis (Mapping the Code).
