= Ed Gruberman =

Ed Gruberman may refer to:

- Ed Gruberman, an impatient martial arts student in the 1987 novelty song "Ti Kwan Leep"
- Ed Gruberman, the main character in the 2009 film Super Capers
