= Frantic Times =

Frantic Times (reissue)
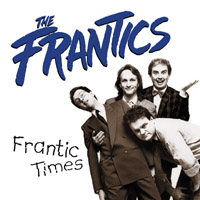

Studio album by The Frantics
- Released: 1984, re-issued 2003
- Recorded: 1984
- Genre: Comedy
- Length: 63:05 (CD reissue)
- Label: Deep Shag Records
- Producer: David Milligan

The Frantics chronology
Frantic Times (reissue) (1984)	Boot to the Head (1987)

Frantic Times is a Canadian comedy album, performed by The Frantics comedy troupe. The original LP was released in 1984, and was reissued as a CD with additional tracks by Deep Shag Records in 2003. The album is wholly made up of sketches and songs that appeared on their CBC radio show Frantic Times. The skits were recorded in front of a live audience in the Blue Orchid Room at the Ontario College of Art.

== Personnel ==
- Paul Chato
- Rick Green
- Dan Redican
- Peter Wildman
- Carolyn Scott (Special Guest)

== Track listing ==
1. "Car Noises" – 3:02
2. "Ed's Perfume" – 1:18
3. "The Human Race" – 2:19
4. "Mrs. Sarnicky's Soap" – 1:16
5. "Heaven Is For Presbyterians" – 3:57
6. "Butcher's Heart" – 2:34
7. "Odd Things" – 5:13
8. "Clean Up Your Room" – 0:21
9. "Last Will and Temperament" – 3:06
10. "Going Home Alone" – 2:38
11. "Yugoslavia" – 2:58
12. "Reach For The Top" – 2:25
13. "Canadian Wildlife Dead Animal" – 1:14
14. "Roman Numerals" – 3:12
15. "Sidewalk Jerry" – 1:13
16. "You Were Speeding" – 1:55
17. "Mrs. Sarnicky's Toilet Paper" – 1:14
18. "Lonely Guy In A Room" – 1:52
19. "How To Write A Song" – 2:16
20. "Outgrossing" – 3:54
21. "Quennel's Mom" – 4:16
22. "Fishin' With Live Bait" – 4:18 +
23. "I'm Following You" – 1:46 +
24. "Todd Booster Mars Blockade" – 3:59 +

+ Additional tracks added to the CD reissue
