= Mark Askwith =

Canadian producer

- Education: Trinity College, Toronto
- Occupations: Producer, writer, interviewer
- Website: https://www.space.ca/

Mark Askwith is a Canadian producer, writer, interviewer (and sometime-publisher/editor), and a familiar name in the fields of science fiction and comics.

== Early life ==
Askwith's family moved about before settling in Ottawa, Ontario, when he was six years old. Askwith's mother ran a children's bookstore called the Bookery, through which he was able to gain access to a wide range of literature. He cites this exposure to all forms of literature – in particular The Adventures of Tintin album Explorers on the Moon and a "stash of superhero comics" – as a "pivotal event" in his young life, which imbued in him considerable enjoyment of such genres and titles.

Askwith has stated that he "didn't take comics seriously", until his friend, Peter, showed him 'The Tiny Perfect Collection', bringing to his knowledge a range of different comics (by such greats as Will Eisner, Jim Steranko, Michael Kaluta, and Bernie Wrightson), during his first year at University. He graduated with a B.A. in English from Trinity College, University of Toronto.

== The Silver Snail ==
After working at Oberon Press, and Coach House Press, between 1982 and 1987, Askwith managed one of the premiere North American comic book stores – The Silver Snail in Toronto. Situated at that time opposite the Bakka-Phoenix Science Fiction Bookstore, it provided an opportunity to soak up the comics/Sci-Fi atmosphere, and allowed Askwith to meet legendary (and local) Science Fiction and comics authors, including Frank Miller and Bill Sienkiewicz.

Leaving the Silver Snail in 1987, he started work on a Prisoner comic with Dean Motter (below), and worked in an art directorial supportive role on Ron Mann's comics documentary Comic Book Confidential (Sphinx Productions, 1988), an overview/history of the comic book medium in the US, from the 1930s to the '80s. The documentary featured interviews with such noteworthy individuals as Charles Burns, Art Spiegelman, Françoise Mouly, Frank Miller, Stan Lee, Will Eisner, Robert Crumb, Harvey Pekar, and William M. Gaines. The success of the documentary inspired Askwith to expand upon some of Mann's ideas into a television magazine programme which would similarly explore areas of fan interest (comics, Science Fiction, horror, etc.) largely through interviews and commentary. The programme was called Prisoners of Gravity.

== Prisoners of Gravity ==
In 1989, Askwith became a full-time television producer and writer, and one of his first programmes was Prisoners of Gravity. The brainchild of Askwith, Daniel Richler, and Rick Green (who also hosted the programme), Prisoners of Gravity was a Canadian news magazine program that explored speculative fiction, specifically science fiction, fantasy, horror and comics. Produced by TVOntario, the series ran for 139 episodes over five seasons.

The establishing framework for the programme is not dissimilar to that of its similarly-targeted peer Mystery Science Theater 3000, both featuring a stranded host who ostensibly broadcast the programme themselves from isolation. The similarities largely end there, however. MST3K was a comedy programme that focused each episode on a particular film and provided running gag commentary on it. Prisoners of Gravity ran a series of interviews with authors and creators from the science fiction and comics communities, with the host linking the subject matter together and focusing down on a specific topic for that episode.

Episodes from the first season (broadcast between August 1989 and March 1990, and now believed largely missing/wiped) reportedly focused on areas including UFOs, Star Trek and Comic book conventions. The subsequent four seasons (preserved at The Merril Collection of Science Fiction, Speculation and Fantasy public library located in downtown Toronto, Ontario, Canada) often featured episodes on much more specific topics. These included "Will Eisner & The Spirit", "Watchmen", "Cyberpunk", "Ray Bradbury", "The Sandman", "Tolkien" and "Jack Kirby" among many others.

Many of the interviews for these programmes (including specific interviews with Watchmen creators Alan Moore and Dave Gibbons, and Sandman author Neil Gaiman) were apparently carried out by Askwith himself.

Prisoners of Gravity first aired on TVOntario and ran for five seasons and 139 episodes before being canceled in 1994. Many of its episodes were subsequently syndicated, and have appeared (briefly) on PBS, The Discovery Channel and Space, of which Askwith is one of the founding producers.

== Space and CHUM/CTV ==
Space is effectively the Canadian equivalent of The Sci Fi Channel, an English language cable television specialty channel owned and operated by CTVglobemedia. It features mainly sci-fi and fantasy movies, documentaries and television series.

Askwith was one of the founding producers of the channel, which was licensed by the Canadian Radio-television and Telecommunications Commission (CRTC) in 1996, and debuted on October 17, 1997, at 6:00 p.m. EST, under the ownership of CHUM Limited. Askwith is particularly involved in the documentary side of things, and the so-called 'interstitial' materials which pepper the channels' output. The first of which was a comment on the channels first-broadcast film Forbidden Planet by noted Canadian Science Fiction author Robert J. Sawyer.

He has produced – and appeared in – SPACE's HypaSpace Daily/Weekly, an entertainment news programme which looks specifically at the Science Fiction news.

== Books and comics ==
Having been inducted into the worlds of science fiction, fantasy and comics at a young age (Askwith cites in particular C.S. Lewis's Narnia books, works by Andre Norton and Robert A. Heinlein, Superhero comics and The Adventures of Tintin), and later rubbing shoulders with Science Fiction and comics authors at The Silver Snail and Bakka-Phoenix, Askwith has dabbled in writing himself, mostly comics.

Most notably, his collaboration with Dean Motter in helping write the authorised "The Prisoner" sequel met with considerable critical and fan-approval. The four-part prestige-format mini-series, serialised between 1988 and 1989 has subsequently been collected in graphic novel format as Shattered Visage, still in print (since 1990) and published by DC Comics/Warner Bros. in the US, and Titan Books in the UK.

Other comics work includes:

- Andromeda (Silver Snail Comics, 1986) Written and published under the SSC imprint.
- Canadian Comics Cavalcade (Artworx, 1986)
- The True North (CLLDF, 1988) Written for the Canadian Comic Legends Legal Defense Fund. (See: Derek McCulloch)
- Sheet Music (Fantagraphics, 1988)
- "Raising the Roof!" (Bonus Book No. 7) in Justice League International Vol. 1 #18 (DC, Oct 1988) Art by James Webb & Mark Pennington
- "Sharks" in Taboo #2 (Spiderbaby Grafix, Jan 1989) Art by R.G. "Rick" Taylor
- "Davey's Dream" in Taboo #4 (Spiderbaby Grafix, Jan 1990) Art by R.G. "Rick" Taylor
- Caliber Presents #24 (Caliber, 1991?)
- Silencers #1–4 (Caliber Comics, Jul-?Oct? 1991) A mini-series (with Richard G. Taylor), subsequently collected as a limited edition trade, then reprinted in 2007 by Image. (ISBN 1-582-40728-2)
- Ken Lashley's Legends (Draxhall Jump, 2002) Co-writer with Ken Lashley. Art by Ken Lashley, Marvin Mariano & Jason Azevedo
- "Joyride" in Batman: Gotham Knights #32 (DC Oct 2002) A short Batman: 'Black & White' story with M. W. Kaluta, as a backup to Devin Grayson's landmark "24/7" single issue story.
  - Collected in Batman: Black & White 3 (May 2007) (ISBN 1-40121-531-9)
- "Moebius: A Sketch" in Negative Burn Vol. 3 #1 (Desperado Publishing/Image May 2006) With Silencers artist Richard G. Taylor
- The Comic Eye #1 (Blind Bat, Dec 2007) "The Comic Eye is a unique collection of 50 biographical and fictional comic strips by 50 talented comic makers!"
  - Other contributors include: Fred Hembeck • Brad W. Foster • Steve Skeates • Matt Feazell • Rob Walton • Michael T. Gilbert • Allen Freeman • Dave Sim • Rick Geary

== Other ==
The Hugo Award-nominated novel Humans by Canadian science-fiction writer Robert J. Sawyer, published in 2003, carries this dedication: "For Mark Askwith, Master of Multiple Universes."

Askwith is thanked by Alan Moore in his and Bill Sienkiewicz's Big Numbers comic, for, in Askwith's words "read[ing] several articles about chaos theory in the mid- 80s and sav[ing] them", later to be forwarded to Mr Moore, as research for that, ultimately aborted comic series.

He is credited for coming up with the name "Taboo" for Stephen R. Bissette's horror anthology, which was until then being called "The October Project". The title Taboo supposedly played a key part in inspiring Alan Moore (with Eddie Campbell) to write the landmark Jack the Ripper graphic novel From Hell.

He adapted the anime television series of the Capcom game Power Stone into English.

In recent years, due in part to his familiarity with the comics and Science Fiction scenes, and his role with SPACE, he has played a role in various events relating to those fields. On October 23, 2007, he hosted readings by Jasper Fforde, Spider Robinson, Robert J. Sawyer and Jay MillAr as part of the 2007 Toronto International Festival of Authors.

On October 30, 2008, Askwith interviewed Neal Stephenson at the Ryerson Theatre in Toronto. This event is part of the 'This is Not a Reading Series' of book events hosted by Toronto's Pages Book Store.
