= A Choice of Two =

- French: Il faut choisir
- Directed by: John Howe
- Written by: Robert A. Duncan
- Produced by: Malca Gillson; John Howe; Robert Verrall
- Starring: Alexandra Bastedo; Richard Fitzpatrick; Mavor Moore; Leslie Nielsen
- Cinematography: Savas Kalogeras
- Edited by: John Howe
- Music by: John Howe; Art Phillips
- Production companies: National Film Board of Canada; Revenue Canada Customs & Excise
- Distributed by: National Film Board of Canada
- Release date: 1981
- Running time: 58 minutes
- Country: Canada
- Language: English

A Choice of Two (French: Il faut choisir) is a 1981 Canadian film written by Robert A. Duncan and directed by John Howe. It stars Alexandra Bastedo, Mavor Moore, and Leslie Nielsen.

== Plot ==
The film stars Moore as a corporate chairman who is preparing to retire, and is choosing his successor; the candidates are a charming rogue (Nielsen) who is having an affair with the chairman's daughter (Bastedo), and a humorless schemer (Gary Reineke). However, in the process a major corporate fraud is uncovered, necessitating an investigation by Revenue Canada to identify the fraudster.

== Cast ==
- Alexandra Bastedo
- Mavor Moore
- Leslie Nielsen
- Richard Fitzpatrick
- Ken James
- Nuala Fitzgerald
- Budd Knapp
- Gary Reineke

== Reception ==
Budd Knapp won the ACTRA Award for Best Supporting TV Performance at the 12th ACTRA Awards in 1983.
