= Four on the Floor (Canadian TV series) =

1986 sketch comedy series

- Title card
- Genre: Sketch comedy
- Written by: Paul Chato, Rick Green, Dan Redican, Peter Wildman
- Directed by: David Acomba
- Starring: Paul Chato, Rick Green, Dan Redican, Peter Wildman
- Country of origin: Canada
- Original language: English
- No. of seasons: 1
- No. of episodes: 13

Production
- Producer: Morgan Earl
- Camera setup: Rick McVicar
- Running time: 26 minutes

Original release
- Network: CBC
- Release: 1986 – 1986

Four on the Floor is a sketch comedy series which aired on CBC Television in 1986. Consisting of only 13 episodes, the series was a showcase for The Frantics, a comedy troupe consisting of Paul Chato, Rick Green, Dan Redican and Peter Wildman. In the U.K., it aired in Channel 4's traditional Friday night comedy slot, from 10 June to 2 September 1988.

The introduction was voiced by Dan and Rick alternating each line, with video clips and sound effects interspersed in the opening.

Although the series was quickly cancelled due to CBC budget constraints, it was an important influence on later Canadian sketch comedy, such as The Kids in the Hall.

== Character ==
The show's most famous character was Mr. Canoehead, a quintessentially Canadian superhero: on a canoeing trip in Algonquin Park, he was hit by lightning while portaging his aluminum canoe, which became permanently welded to his head. As a crime fighter, he would capture criminals by turning around so that the canoe knocked them over.

The character had been originally developed for the radio show Frantic Times, with the troupe initially uncertain how to make the sketch work for television.

== See also ==
- Boot to the Head
- History Bites
- The Red Green Show
