= Puppets Who Kill =

Canadian television series

- Genre: Dark comedy
- Created by: John Pattison; Steven Westren
- Written by: John Pattison; Dan Redican
- Starring: Dan Redican; Bruce Hunter; Bob Martin; James Rankin; Gord Robertson
- Country of origin: Canada
- Original language: English
- No. of seasons: 4
- No. of episodes: 53

Production
- Producers: John Pattison; Shawn Alex Thompson
- Running time: 30 mins
- Production companies: PWK Productions

Original release
- Network: The Comedy Network
- Release: October 4, 2002 – June 22, 2006

Puppets Who Kill is a Canadian television comedy series produced by PWK Productions and originally broadcast on The Comedy Network. It premiered in Canada in 2002, and Australia on The Comedy Channel in 2004. It has also been broadcast in India, South Korea and Germany. The series was on the digital network Hulu and is currently on CONtv and Tubi in the United States.

PWK began as a one-man live theatre show written and performed by comedian/puppeteer John Pattison at the Toronto Fringe Festival in 1995. It later morphed into the series, using the same dark topics and featuring some of the same puppet characters. In 1999, a pilot for Puppets Who Kill was produced for the Comedy Network and broadcast in January 2000. The network ordered the first season of 13 episodes, which was produced in the fall of 2001, held back by the network for one year, and finally broadcast in the fall of 2002. For the next 3 years, a new season of the series was produced every fall.

In Puppets Who Kill, Rocko the Dog, Cuddles the Comfort Doll, Buttons the Bear, and Bill the Ventriloquist Dummy are four puppets with anthropomorphic qualities including individual histories of delinquency and recidivism. Canadian courts sent each of them to a halfway house for puppets, operated by a hapless and somewhat incompetent social worker named Dan Barlow, played by Dan Redican.

== Characters ==
=== Rocko the Dog ===
Rocko (puppeteer Bruce Hunter), is a foul-mouthed, chain-smoking Miniature Schnauzer who formerly worked on a children's television program. The job required him to control his language and behavior, but eventually, a berserk outburst on set ended his career. He takes medication to temper his violent mood swings.

=== Cuddles the Comfort Doll ===
Cuddles (puppeteer Bob Martin) is a comfort doll designed to help people cope with their problems. However, as the introductory voice-over to each episode informs the viewer, it is Cuddles who is now the problem. The chronic subordination of his own needs to those of others caused him to explode one day, grab a rifle, and start shooting. Despite this eruption, Cuddles is generally the best-behaved of the group, although his naivete often gets him and his fellow residents at the halfway house into trouble. He cannot handle pressure well, lacks self-assertiveness, and shows signs of a passive-aggressive personality disorder.

=== Buttons the Bear ===
Buttons (puppeteer James Rankin) is a teddy bear with eyes consisting of two buttons. Unlike the others, Buttons is not so much a killer as a lover. In fact, he is a womanizer with no sense of sexual propriety who is remarkably successful in attracting eager human females. Buttons lives by the hedonistic motto "If it feels good, do it". He once had a lucrative corporate sponsorship deal with the Happy Elf Peanut Butter Company, but the sponsor exercised the "moral turpitude" clause in his contract once details of his promiscuous behavior leaked to the press.

=== Bill the ventriloquist Dummy ===
Bill (puppeteer Gord Robertson) is a ventriloquist's dummy with a menacing smile and psychopathic tendencies. Fifty-eight of his partners have died in "accidents". Bill's nemesis is the Rasputin-like Curious Bob (John Hemphill), a former partner whom Bill has unsuccessfully attempted to murder on four occasions. In an episode featuring Bill's trial, his adoptive mother relates facts about his past that indicate the possible sources of his homicidal vengefulness; for example, that Bill had some bowel problems as a child and would defecate in his pants, thus earning him the nickname "poopy pants" from his peers. Bill also has a small penis and oddly shaped gonads which his maker gave him in order to encourage humility but which instead produced only more humiliation for Bill, perhaps explaining his gruesome hobby of collecting the testicles of men who have somehow been mysteriously deprived of them. Bill was at some point castrated himself, and is now a eunuch.

=== Dan Barlow ===
Dan Barlow is a social worker who runs the halfway house where the puppets live but who shows himself ill-suited to his particular vocation. He has difficulty with his moral compass, finds himself easily swept up in events, and often makes poor decisions. Although he genuinely cares about his charges, Dan's primary concern is keeping the halfway house open thus preserving his job.

== Production ==
The series was shot both in the studio and on location in and around Toronto. It showcases Canadian talent, using several guest actors per episode, many of them well-known in Canada, playing an array of idiosyncratic characters. Newsreader Bill Cameron regularly appeared as himself, often foreshadowing the show's plot by reporting on bizarre crimes that could only have been committed by Dan's charges. Among the many actors who have appeared in the series are Gordon Pinsent, Kristin Lehman, Emily Hampshire, Peter Outerbridge, Anna Silk and Helene Joy.

Most of the Puppets Who Kill episodes were written by founding creator/producer John Pattison, with Dan Redican also writing several episodes and providing story editing advice. More than half of the episodes were directed by producer Shawn Alex Thompson. The series employed experienced people recruited from the film industry in some of the technical positions. The contributions of sound designer Daniel Pellerin, editor Caroline Christie, and composer Carlos Lopes, among others, enhanced the look and sound of the series.

On June 22, 2006, the show completed its fourth and final season. The first and second seasons have been released on DVD in full. Seasons 3 and 4 appeared in a 'Best of' collection in 2010 with audio commentaries by key cast and crew, and contains some of the show's greatest hits including such popular episodes as "The Joyride" and "The Rival House".

== Awards ==
Puppets Who Kill won many awards in its four-year run. In Canada, it won 3 Gemini Awards, including Best Writing in a Comedy for founding creator/writer/producer John Pattison and Best Directing in a Comedy for producer/director Shawn Alex Thompson. PWK went on to receive a total of 15 Gemini nominations in various categories, from writing, directing, and acting to sound design and photography. The series also won the prestigious Bronze Rose for Comedy at the Montreux Television Festival in Switzerland in 2003, coming in second to The Office.

== Legacy ==
As confirmed by the PWK website, a Puppets Who Kill movie was in the works.

Dan Redican (known as Dan Barlow on the show) has toured Canada with the comedy troupe The Frantics.

John Pattison has occasionally performed his live puppet show Beyond Puppets Who Kill in various cities in Canada.

== List of Episodes ==
=== Pilot (2000) ===
Title	Original release date	Prod. code
"Pilot"	January 30, 2000	100
Dan meets with four puppet clients and finds that each of them has deeply rooted psychological problems. Rocko decides to help a children's show host get a kidney for a large amount of money but is frustrated at how difficult it is to achieve his goal. Buttons, at Dan's behest, seduces a woman who could make or break the halfway house.

=== Season 1 (2002–2003) ===
No. overall	No. in season	Title	Original release date	Prod. code
1	1	"Buttons, the City Councillor and the City Councillor's Wife"	October 11, 2002	110
Buttons has a torrid affair with the city councillor's wife; Dan and Bill argue over whether the toilet seat should stay up or down.
2	2	"Cuddles Goes to Jail"	October 18, 2002	105
Dan sends Cuddles to jail for the weekend; someone in the city is stealing testicles.
3	3	"Buttons Goes to Court"	October 25, 2002	109
Buttons testifies against a former employer; Rocko starts a new business selling Dan's urine through the mail.
4	4	"Bill's Brain"	November 1, 2002	106
Bill the ventriloquist dummy gets talked into going to the hospital for a lobotomy. Meanwhile, Buttons finds a friendly nurse to become intimate with, and Rocko tries to help Dan face his fear of death.
5	5	"The Island of Skip-Along Pete"	November 8, 2002	104
Dan invites a special guest named Skip-Along Pete, who takes Rocko out to his island for a special weekend.
6	6	"Rocko's Telethon"	November 15, 2002	111
Dan lands Rocko a gig on a telethon for impaled people; Cuddles gets waylaid at a strip club.
7	7	"Cuddles the Safety Mascot"	November 22, 2002	107
Dan gets Cuddles a job as a safety mascot to replace one killed in a flaming car wreck.
8	8	"Dan's Crush"	November 29, 2002	101
Dan develops an unhealthy crush on Buttons. Meanwhile, Cuddles tries to reconcile with an old buddy.
9	9	"Dash the Greeter"	December 6, 2002	103
A hideously deformed puppet named Dash gets a job as a department-store greeter.
10	10	"Cuddles Gets Laid"	December 13, 2002	102
Cuddles has his first sexual experience, and he begins to explore his sexuality with incredible depth. Meanwhile, Bill is faced with one of the only surviving partners from his past life, but is concerned that he will press charges about his crimes.
11	11	"Dan's Umbrella"	December 20, 2002	108
Dan and Bill take a tour of the CBC. Dan loses his umbrella and must navigate its bureaucracy in attempt to retrieve it, while Bill finds a secret room which contains the brains of dead Canadian celebrities.
12	12	"Mr. Quigley, the Asshole Next Door"	December 27, 2002	112
Dan has a running battle with Mr. Quigley, the next-door neighbor.
13	13	"The Payback"	January 3, 2003	113
The puppets think they are rich after Bill finds a suitcase full of money, until its owners show up and want the money back.

=== Season 2 (2004) ===
No. overall	No. in season	Title	Original release date	Prod. code
14	1	"Bill Sues"	January 30, 2004	208
Bill wants to sue the families of his murder victims for emotional damages. Meanwhile, Dan teaches Cuddles how to defend himself.
15	2	"Portrait of Buttons"	February 6, 2004	205
Buttons fears a gypsy curse on him is real when his painting starts to age.
16	3	"Prostitutes for Jesus"	February 13, 2004	201
Bill and Rocko pretend to be terminally ill to receive sexual services from two prostitutes who claim to be doing God's work by servicing the terminally ill. Meanwhile, Dan shows Cuddles a magic trick, while Buttons is hunted by the spouse of his current flame.
17	4	"Cuddles the Demon"	February 20, 2004	207
When Dan holds a seance, Cuddles becomes possessed by a demon with an evil plan to annihilate the world. In order to finish the job, the demon needs a virgin sacrifice and Dan seems to be just the right candidate.
18	5	"Buttons and the Geriatric"	February 27, 2004	203
Buttons picks an elderly rich widow as his ticket to the comfortable life and does not hesitate to get rid of anyone who tries to stop her changing her will to leave him all the inheritance.
19	6	"Dead Ted"	March 5, 2004	209
Rocko's old cellmate, Ted, drops by to say hi. Ted offers to share his hidden loot with Rocko, but dies before he can tell where the treasure is hidden. Meanwhile, Buttons thinks he has lucked out when he meets two lesbians who appear to want to have sex with him.
20	7	"Cuddles the Religious Icon"	March 12, 2004	211
Cuddles is thought to have the healing powers of Jesus and the neighbours flock to see 'the miracle child'.
21	8	"Bill's Got the Blues"	March 19, 2004	202
Bill is suffering from extreme depression because Dan has forbidden him to commit murder. Dan needs Bill to cheer up, however, so he can have a shot at a successful Social Workers Grant.
22	9	"Pizza Boys Are Missing"	March 26, 2004	210
Pizza delivery boys start mysteriously disappearing. Rocko and Cuddles decide to take a job delivering pizza, in the hopes that it will help them get laid. Meanwhile, Buttons lies to an attractive lady in order to get what he wants.
23	10	"Rocko Gets a Lung"	April 2, 2004	206
Rocko needs a new lung since chain-smoking has gotten to him; Bill goes on a game show to raise enough money to buy a lung for Rocko on the black market.
24	11	"Dan and the Necrophiliac"	April 9, 2004	204
Dan and the puppets attend a funeral, where Dan discovers that his cousin is a necrophiliac; Cuddles gets a job at a hospital in order to boost his self esteem.
25	12	"Rocko and the Twins"	April 16, 2004	212
Rocko and Buttons meet some Siamese Twins on a blind date, and find that they like the arrangement. Dan has problems with his angry newspaper boy.
26	13	"The Twilight Place"	April 23, 2004	213
In a homage to The Twilight Zone, the puppets find an old TV for a very cheap price; they discover the TV has some scary secrets to reveal, and is not so easy to get rid of.

=== Season 3 (2005) ===
No. overall	No. in season	Title	Original release date	Prod. code
27	1	"Buttons on a Hot Tin Roof"	February 11, 2005	301
Buttons works as a gardener for a wealthy old wheelchair bound colonel and begins having an affair with his wife; it's Dan, however, that the colonel suspects of having the affair.
28	2	"Cuddles the Manchurian Candidate"	February 18, 2005	302
Cuddles gets brainwashed by the Canadian military to be a killer zombie when triggered by a code word. Unfortunately, something sets Cuddles off and Dan has to figure out how to stop him.
29	3	"Buttons the Dresser"	February 25, 2005	303
Dan and the puppets work backstage at a Shakespeare festival; Buttons is a dresser for one of the great legends of the theatre, Sir Percy Quill, who is playing Macbeth. Meanwhile, Bill gets some unwanted criticism on his acting abilities.
30	4	"Gus the Arsonist"	March 4, 2005	304
Dan brings a former arsonist named Gus to the halfway house. The puppets' antics drive him to the brink, right as a series of arsons are reported. Meanwhile, Buttons lies about being a doctor to get the attention of his latest flame.
31	5	"Rocko's Politician"	March 11, 2005	310
Rocko goes to protest against the latest candidate's anti-criminal laws, and winds up as the campaign manager for a local bartender.
32	6	"Buttons and the Paternity Suit"	March 18, 2005	309
Buttons is sued by a woman whom he had a child with 20 years ago, and goes to court with Dan as his lawyer. Meanwhile, Bill and Rocko compete to see who can commit the most crimes.
33	7	"Dan and the Bird Flu"	March 25, 2005	305
Cuddles is injected with the Shanghai bird flu. Meanwhile, Bill takes out an advertisement looking for a little cannibalistic action, and Buttons takes Rocko's medication.
34	8	"The CBC is Killing Again"	April 1, 2005	306
Bill and Rocko are hired by the CBC to knock off celebrities from rival networks.
35	9	"The Lovely Fred"	April 8, 2005	311
Corrections Canada sends a woman named Fred to the halfway house.
36	10	"The Amazing Bill"	April 15, 2005	313
When Bill successfully predicts a series of murders, he is thought to be a psychic, and becomes a local sensation. Meanwhile, Rocko refuses to wash the dishes.
37	11	"Buttons' Big Fat Greek Wedding"	April 22, 2005	312
Buttons makes plans to elope with his new girlfriend after her dad disapproves of their relationship, but her dad, who is actually a drug dealer, decides to use Buttons for his own personal gain. Meanwhile, Bill and Rocko are hired as hitmen right after promising to stop killing, which is further complicated when they are given a task to kill Buttons.
38	12	"Cuddles the Artist"	April 29, 2005	307
Dan encourages Cuddles to be more creative in his artistic endeavours, but is surprised when he sees the unusual source for Cuddles' newest creations. When Cuddles is believed to be dead shortly thereafter from an apparent suicide, interest in this art skyrockets, and Bill and Rocko quickly move to advantage of this atmosphere.
39	13	"Dan and the New Neighbour"	May 6, 2005	308
Bill must deal with Corrections Canada's new social worker intern at their house. Meanwhile, Dan, Cuddles, and Buttons fight for their new neighbour's affections.

=== Season 4 (2006) ===
No. overall	No. in season	Title	Original release date	Prod. code
40	1	"Joyride"	March 2, 2006	407
The puppets steal a car from outside a variety store, and head out for a joyride. Meanwhile, Buttons hitches a ride with an odd couple who mess with his head.
41	2	"Dan and the Garden Shears"	March 9, 2006	406
Dan has a hard time getting garden shears back from his nasty neighbor. Buttons has an affair with a cursed woman.
42	3	"Mr. Big"	March 16, 2006	TBD
In a black and white homage dedicated to 1940's 'B' movies. Dan and Cuddles are drawn into a web of intrigue when Cuddles accidentally acquires a mysterious falcon from some criminals.
43	4	"Dan is Dead"	March 23, 2006	TBD
The puppets think that Dan is dead. They grieve for him at his funeral until they learn that they stand to inherit a lot of money.
44	5	"Bill and the Berkowitzs"	March 30, 2006	TBD
A dispute between Rocko and a local drug dealer climaxes with a dead mailman at the door of the halfway house and Bill being blamed for it. To rehab his image, Bill befriends an elderly couple but this doesn't turn exactly as he planned.
45	6	"Oedipus Dan"	April 6, 2006	TBD
Dan's mother arrives for a short visit at the halfway house. After a series of unfortunate accidents, and a little subtle encouragement from Rocko, she begins to believe that Dan has an Oedipus complex.
46	7	"Buttons and the Dying Wish Foundation"	April 13, 2006	TBD
Buttons attempts the ultimate act of charity by granting a dying woman's last wish. Meanwhile, Rocko tries to help out an old prison friend, and Bill keeps catching Dan in compromising situations.
47	8	"Bill's Wedding"	April 20, 2006	TBD
A minister and his wife pay a visit to the halfway house and in a short amount of time, Buttons starts fooling around with the wife, to the dismay of the minister. Meanwhile, Bill is set to marry a woman he has known only briefly even as reports circulate of a beautiful woman killing people at an alarming rate.
48	9	"The Rival House"	April 27, 2006	TBD
Dan and the puppets are pitted against a rival halfway house full of ridiculously nice puppets. Things come to a head when Corrections Canada tells Dan that one of the houses must close - theirs or the rival house.
49	10	"The Hostage"	May 4, 2006	TBD
Buttons' trip to Rio lands him in hot war financially and he resorts to kidnapping a wealthy businessman as a means to extricate him from the mess. Dan tries to get Corrections Canada to hire a maid to clean the house for him.
50	11	"A Few Feuds"	May 11, 2006	TBD
A series of misunderstandings lead Rocko, Bill, Buttons and Cuddles to believe each of them is trying to kill one of the others in house. Meanwhile, Dan finds himself caught up in an old feud between two warring families.
51	12	"Dan's Ideal Woman"	May 18, 2006	TBD
Dan tells Buttons of his ideal woman and is horrified when Buttons finds and seduces a woman that fits that description. Meanwhile, Bill starts to build bombs as a hobby and Rocko tries to get in shape with equipment he steals from others.
52	13	"Buttons the Ghost"	June 22, 2006	TBD
Dan and Buttons are involved in a car accident with Buttons left in a near death coma as a result. However, Buttons' ghost appears at the halfway house and quickly makes Dan's life miserable as only he can.

== DVD ==
DVD releases include Puppets Who Kill: The Complete First Season, Puppets Who Kill: The Complete Second Season, and Puppets Who Kill: Best of Season 3 & 4.

== See also ==
- Adult puppeteering
- Greg the Bunny
- Magic realism
- Meet the Feebles
- Fur TV
