= Prisoners of Gravity =

Canadian television news magazine program

- Genre: Documentary
- Created by: Mark Askwith
- Developed by: Mark Askwith; Daniel Richler
- Presented by: Rick Green
- Theme music composer: Norman Orenstein
- Country of origin: Canada
- Original language: English
- No. of seasons: 5
- No. of episodes: 139 (list of episodes)

Production
- Executive producer: Daniel Richler
- Producers: Jamie Mandelkau, writer/director/producer (Season 1), Gregg Thurlbeck (Seasons 2 through 5)
- Production location: Toronto
- Running time: 25 minutes

Original release
- Network: TVOntario
- Release: August 21, 1989 – April 28, 1994

Prisoners of Gravity is a Canadian television news magazine program. Produced by TVOntario, the show was created by Mark Askwith and Daniel Richler, and was hosted by Rick Green. The series aired 139 episodes over five seasons from 1989 to 1994.

The series explored speculative fiction—science fiction, fantasy, horror, comic books—and its relation to various thematic and social issues.

== Format ==
As established through a comic-strip montage opening sequence drawn by Ty Templeton, the premise held that Rick, a fan of speculative fiction, becomes disturbed by news broadcasts describing the alarming state of the world and decides that he must escape the Earth. He broadcasts his show each week, with help from his computer companion Nan-Cy (short for NANo-CYbernetic 3000), from an orbiting space station. The show's presentation was fully wrapped in its quirky premise, featuring on-screen graphics and background sounds to simulate a space station atmosphere, "using active, innovative cinematography to ease the visual boredom that often accompanies interviews with talking head(s)."

The week's topic was introduced with a few opening thoughts before launching into various interview clips. In each episode, Rick would interview a number of authors and artists, along with filmmakers, animators, and the occasional futurist. Topics that were discussed ran the gamut: censorship, superheroes, humour, religion, fairy tales, Mars, cyberpunk, war, overpopulation, and sex. Episodes were 30 minutes in length (having no commercial breaks on public television) and typically showcased six to fourteen interviewed creators alongside bridging commentary from Rick. Roughly six hundred interviews were conducted and aired by the time the show's run came to an end.

== Production ==
The series was produced by TV Ontario, a public broadcasting station.

The interviews were conducted at science fiction and comic book conventions by production team members Mark Askwith, Shirley Brady, and Gregg Thurlbeck. The majority of the shows were edited by Brian Karn. The series was produced and directed by Jamie Mandelkau (season 1) and by Gregg Thurlbeck (seasons 2 through 5).

== Interviews ==
During its run, the list of authors interviewed became increasingly prestigious, including Clive Barker, George R.R. Martin, Ray Bradbury, David Brin, Charles de Lint, Harlan Ellison, Douglas Adams, William Gibson, Frederik Pohl, Terry Pratchett, Anne Rice, Spider Robinson, and Robert J. Sawyer, who was the most frequent guest on the program. Among the many interviewed comic book creators were Chris Claremont, Will Eisner, Neil Gaiman (who was twice selected as the fan-favourite guest in a viewership mail-in vote), Bob Kane, Jack Kirby, Stan Lee, Daniel Clowes, Fabian Nicieza, Walt Simonson, Scott McCloud, Frank Miller, and Alan Moore. Other notable guests included Star Trek creator Gene Roddenberry and actor Michael Dorn, film directors James Cameron and David Cronenberg, award-winning CGI animator Steve 'Spaz' Williams, and renowned palaeontologist Richard Leakey.

== Awards ==
The program was critically successful and won several awards, including the following:

1. Two Prix Aurora Awards
2. A Broadcast Media Award from the International Reading Association
3. A Silver Medal from the New York Festivals of Television
4. Two Gemini nominations.
5. An Honourable Mention from the Columbus International Film & Video Festival

== Cancellation ==
The show was cancelled in 1994 for unspecified reasons, possibly relating to TVOntario's intended programming diversification. According to Rick Green, the signature chair from the space station sat in his garage until "raccoons pooed all over it..." and it was discarded.

== Availability ==
In the 1990s, the series premiered with select episodes from Season 2 onward being broadcast in the United States on PBS, and in Canada on the sci-fi specialty channel Space (which producer Mark Askwith had gone on to develop and continues to helm) and on Discovery Channel Canada.

Due to contractual restrictions made with interviewees at the time of the show's production, there is no commercial release on video or DVD. In 2011, TVOntario posted several episodes from the series in a lower resolution in their public archives. In addition, many episodes (bar the first series) are at The Merril Collection of Science Fiction, Speculation and Fantasy public library located in downtown Toronto, Canada. The Merril Collection's tapes are reputed to be Askwith's own, donated to the collection for preservation. Interview clips from the show are also included with the CD-ROM in newer editions of The Encyclopedia of Science Fiction by John Clute.
