= Ti Kwan Leep =

Canadian sketch comedy recording

Ti Kwan Leep is a sketch comedy recording by the Canadian comedy troupe The Frantics. It appeared on their 1987 album Boot to the Head.

In the skit, an Eastern martial arts master starts off his class by explaining the basic philosophy of a fictional martial art called "Ti Kwan Leep" (take one leap). An impatient student in the class named Ed Gruberman interrupts the master, wanting to skip the philosophy and learn how to "beat people up". After the master is interrupted several times while using Zen koans to demonstrate the virtue of patience, he agrees to show Gruberman some moves, and gives him a "Boot to the Head" (a catch phrase of the troupe that started in their 1984 sketch Last Will and Temperament). The situation rapidly escalates until the entire class is left beaten and broken; their moans and groans then become the "Ommmmm" of meditation.

This skit was followed on the album (and often when played on the radio) with the song "Boot to the Head." The two were combined into a single track for disc 2 of the Dr. Demento 20th Anniversary Collection, with a line from "Ti Kwan Leep" containing a mild expletive edited out.

Ed Gruberman also appeared in the Frantics' skit "Army Careers." The name was subsequently used for the main character in the 2009 film Super Capers: The Origins of Ed and the Missing Bullion.
