= Paul Chato =

Canadian comedian and web developer

- Born: 1954 (age 71–72)
- Occupations: Comedian; writer; television executive; web developer; entrepreneur
- Known for: Member of The Frantics
- Notable work: The Frantics; Frantic Times; Four on the Floor; The Vacant Lot

Paul Chato is a Canadian comedian, writer, former television executive, web developer and entrepreneur. He is best known as a member of the comedy troupe The Frantics.

Chato was born in 1954 in Toronto, Ontario, Canada, to Hungarian parents. He grew up in Don Mills, a planned community outside Toronto. He graduated from Don Mills Collegiate in 1973 and later studied Radio Television Arts at Ryerson Polytechnical Institute.

== Career ==
After graduating from Ryerson, Chato became an art director with Kelly’s Stereo Mart. He later joined Rick Green to form Green and Chato, a two-man comedy team. In 1979, Green and Chato joined Dan Redican and Peter Wildman to form the comedy group The Frantics.

The Frantics' work included stage performances, the CBC radio series Frantic Times, and the CBC Television sketch series Four on the Floor. The Canadian Communications Foundation's History of Canadian Broadcasting describes Four on the Floor as an important CBC sketch-comedy series and notes that The Vacant Lot, co-created by Chato, was among the later CBC sketch-comedy programs that followed in its tradition.

From 1989 to 1991, Chato was head of television comedy at CBC Television. In 1990, Broadcast + Technology identified him as head of CBC sitcoms.

== Web development and business work ==
In addition to his continued association with The Frantics, Chato is the president of Your Web Department (formerly Electramedia), an international web development company. In 2001, the Government of Canada trade publication CanadExport described Chato as president of G + A Electramedia, a Toronto-based web design and development company. The company won a Best of COMDEX award for Best Security Product for AccessArmor, a managed password-authentication product.

== Online work ==
Chato has channels on YouTube and Odysee. His entertainment-review channel, Call Me Chato, reviews popular entertainment from the perspective of a "former Network executive". He also has a social-commentary and news-reaction channel called aPauling News. His earlier YouTube videos focused on IT-related comedy and technology.
