= The Frantics (comedy) =

Canadian comedy troupe

- Notable work: Frantic Times; Four on the Floor; Boot to the Head; The Frantics Reunion Special

Comedy career
- Years active: 1979–1989; 2004–2009
- Medium: Stage; radio; television; albums
- Genres: Sketch comedy; Satire; Surreal humour; Musical comedy
- Members: Paul Chato; Rick Green; Dan Redican; Peter Wildman
- Website: thefrantics.com

The Frantics is a Canadian comedy troupe consisting of Paul Chato, Rick Green, Dan Redican and Peter Wildman. The group formed in Toronto in 1979 and became known for its stage work, CBC Radio series Frantic Times, and CBC Television sketch series Four on the Floor.

== History ==
=== Formation and early stage work ===
The group formed in 1979. Chato and Green had written and performed together as a comedy team since high school. They joined the in-house comedy troupe at the Pink Flamingo Cabaret in Toronto, where they met Wildman. Redican, who had been performing as a satirical folk singer and puppeteer in London, Ontario, appeared at the Flamingo as Poopy Dan, performing a "Marxist kiddie show". The three recruited Redican, and the four formed The Frantics.

After leaving the Pink Flamingo, the troupe performed in the local comedy scene, toured Holiday Inns and campuses, and ultimately headlined at big-city clubs. The group’s official history states that the act was originally called Skits-O-Frantics before being shortened to The Frantics during an appearance at Toronto's El Mocambo.

=== CBC radio and Frantic Times ===
In 1981, The Frantics were given a weekly radio slot on the CBC Radio program Variety Tonight, then hosted by Vicki Gabereau. In the summer of 1982, they served as the summer replacement for the Royal Canadian Air Farce. The troupe received its own permanent time slot in the fall of 1983.

Between 1981 and 1984, their show, Frantic Times, ran for 113 episodes. Each episode regularly featured a female "special guest": in earlier episodes this was Carolyn Scott, while later episodes featured Mag Ruffman. Sound effects formed an important part of the show and were generally provided by Cathy Perry, a longtime CBC sound technician and later a producer at CBC.

The group’s official history states that Frantic Times grew to attract about half a million listeners a week and resulted in 120 half-hour radio shows. A 2016 Newswire release by the group stated that Frantic Times aired 110 episodes into 1984.

=== Albums and television ===
The album Frantic Times was released in 1984 and collected sketches and songs from the radio show. In 2003, Deep Shag Records reissued the album with a new cover and three previously unreleased selections.

In 1984, the troupe appeared as a feature act with a number of sketches in a television pilot, The No Name Show, for TVOntario, which was not picked up for a series. In 1986, the troupe moved to television with the CBC series Four on the Floor, which lasted one season of thirteen episodes. The Canadian Communications Foundation's History of Canadian Broadcasting states that the series aired weekly from January to August 1986 and featured the four members of The Frantics writing and performing their own material. The series also aired in England and the United States under the name The Frantics.

A couple of short radio series followed, including Fran of the Fundy, a three-part spoof of Anne of Green Gables, in 1987, and the eight-part The Frantics Look at History in 1988.

== Style and recurring material ==
The Frantics were noted for off-the-wall humour, with some skits and novelty songs reminiscent of The Goon Show and Monty Python’s Flying Circus. They satirized subjects ranging from suicide hotlines and current advertisements to Tom Swift science fiction. The troupe became particularly known for the recurring character Mr. Canoehead, a crime fighter with a full-sized aluminum canoe welded to his head by lightning, whose battle cry was "Taste gunwale!", and for the catchphrase "Boot to the head!", also the title of one of their best-known sketches.

Some of The Frantics’ radio sketches were also aired in the United States on the Dr. Demento show, as were later Canadian comedy acts such as The Arrogant Worms and The Vestibules.

== Reunion and later activity ==
In 2004, the troupe re-formed and returned to the stage with a mix of new and old material, which was released on CD as Official Bootleg CD: Live at the Tim Sims Playhouse. Following the success of their Older But Wider stage tour in Ontario, The Frantics filmed a comedy special for the Canadian The Comedy Network/CTV in 2005 entitled The Frantics Reunion Special, which aired on January 28, 2006.

They also appeared at the 2005 Winnipeg Comedy Festival, which was broadcast on the CBC Festival of Funny radio show. That marked their first on-air reunion since 1988. They also appeared in the gala of the festival, which aired on CBC television in March 2006.

Later engagements included live performances at the Jane Mallett Theatre in Toronto, at the St. Lawrence Centre for the Arts, featuring a mix of new and revived material. On December 7, 2009, the troupe staged a one-night-only 30th anniversary performance at which they released their CD Frantic Noises.

After a fundraiser on Indiegogo ending in November 2016, a Best of Frantic Times podcast project was set up, mostly excerpting pieces from the CBC radio show but with occasional pieces of more recent material, publishing what was to be 30 episodes. The 2016 Newswire release stated that the project was intended to repackage archived Frantic Times material as a free podcast series.

== Discography ==
- Frantic Times (1984, re-issued 2003)
- Boot to the Head (1987)
- Official Bootleg CD—Live at the Tim Sims Playhouse (2004)
- Enemies of Reason (2006)
- Frantic Noises (available 2009 with a printed copyright date 2010)
