= Dan Redican =

Canadian comedian

- Born: 1956 (age 69–70); Toronto, Ontario, Canada
- Occupations: Comedy writer; performer; puppeteer; actor; television producer
- Years active: 1979–present
- Known for: The Frantics; Four on the Floor; The Kids in the Hall; Puppets Who Kill; Sunnyside
- Spouse: Caroline A. Commisso
- Children: 2

Dan Redican (born 1956) is a Canadian comedy writer, performer and puppeteer, best known for his work with the comedy troupe the Frantics. As a founding member of the troupe, he has worked since 1979 on numerous stage shows, the Frantic Times radio show, and the Four on the Floor TV show, which aired in England and the United States under the name The Frantics. The troupe has also written and performed albums that remain available through the website Frantics.com.

== Career ==
=== Puppetry and early performance ===
Redican started his career as a puppeteer, performing with various partners at birthday parties and church functions before joining Tom Vandenburg to perform two family shows at the Toronto Centre for the Arts on Dupont Street: The Old Fisherman and A Day At Rotten Cheese Gulch. After this, Redican focussed on solo performances in London, Ontario, at Smale's Pace, later renamed the Change of Pace.

Redican entered television puppetry on CHCH's Adventures of Snelgrove Snail, in which he played Conrad Crepidula. He left puppetry to focus on comedy when the Frantics formed in 1979, but returned briefly in the late 1980s as a featured actor and puppeteer for the Jim Henson Company on NBC's The Jim Henson Hour. In the 1990s, Redican puppeteered the character Hegdish on YTV's Groundling Marsh and Maurice the Maggot on YTV's Freaky Stories.

In the late 1970s, Redican performed as a folk singer with his short-lived band Poopy Dan and his Lunch, which featured Pat Logier, Rob Minderman and Doug Hux.

=== The Frantics ===
The Frantics were formed in 1979 by Redican, Paul Chato, Rick Green and Peter Wildman. The group had performed on community television before receiving a regular CBC radio show, Frantic Times, and later moving to television with Four on the Floor. The Canadian Communications Foundation's History of Canadian Broadcasting describes Four on the Floor as an important CBC sketch-comedy series and notes that Redican later appeared in Puppets Who Kill.

=== Acting, writing and television production ===
Redican has worked as an actor, appearing in an episode of Seeing Things in the 1980s and in various small roles before playing George, the next-door neighbour, on CBC's Mosquito Lake. He also appeared on Maniac Mansion, The Twilight Zone, Corner Gas and Little Mosque on the Prairie. He starred as Dan Barlow in the Comedy Network series Puppets Who Kill, on which he also worked as a writer and story editor.

In 1988, Redican appeared on the children's television series The Elephant Show as the Royal Ontario Museum's night watchman. He later co-starred with Sharon, Lois & Bram in their 1994 home video Candles, Snow & Mistletoe, produced by Glen Roven.

Redican has written and produced a number of Canadian television shows, including Blackfly, Not This But This, The Altar Boy Gang and The Kids in the Hall. In the United States, he worked as a writer and producer on The Jenny McCarthy Show, Chimp Channel and Lyricist Lounge. He later wrote and acted as a creative consultant on episodes of CBC Television's Little Mosque on the Prairie, in which he also played a chiropractor in the episode "Marriage Minded".

Along with Gary Pearson, Redican is a cocreator of the sketch comedy series Sunnyside, which premiered in 2015.

=== Stage work ===
Redican has performed a number of times in Toronto as a comic monologist, including small shows at the Rivoli and performances of The Cheese Stands Alone and My Private Hell On Ten Dollars a Day at the Factory Theatre. His show Stop Being Stupid ran at the Tim Sim's Theatre and received favourable reviews. The Devil's Progress Report enjoyed a short run in a Vancouver theatre. His monology drew the attention of Lorne Michaels and led to Redican becoming a producer and story editor for The Kids in the Hall.

== Awards and nominations ==
Redican received several award nominations for his television work. According to Contemporary Theatre, Film and Television, he shared a Gemini Award nomination for Four on the Floor in 1986, received a Gemini Award nomination for The Dan Redican Comedy Hour in 1995, received Canadian Comedy Award nominations for Puppets Who Kill in 2003 and 2004, shared a Gemini Award nomination for Puppets Who Kill in 2005, and received a Gemini Award nomination for writing on Burnt Toast in 2006.

== Personal life ==
Redican is married to television writer and producer Caroline A. Commisso. He has two children, Madi and Joey.
