= Rick Green (comedian) =

Canadian comedian, actor, and writer

Rick Green CM OOnt
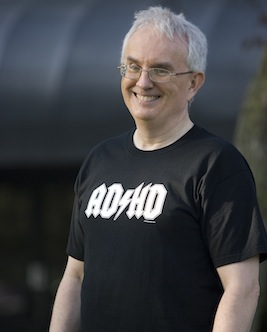
- Green in 2008
- Born: Richard Green; November 4, 1953 (age 72)
- Education: University of Waterloo
- Occupations: Comedy writer; producer; director; performer
- Known for: The Frantics; The Red Green Show; History Bites; Prisoners of Gravity; ADD & Loving It?!

Rick Green (born November 4, 1953) is a Canadian comedy writer, producer, director and performer. He was a member of the sketch-comedy troupe The Frantics, and later became known for his work on The Red Green Show, History Bites and Prisoners of Gravity. Green has also produced work about adult attention deficit hyperactivity disorder (ADHD), including the documentary ADD & Loving It?!.

== Early life and education ==
Green graduated from the University of Waterloo with a Bachelor of Science degree in physics. He worked as a presenter at the Ontario Science Centre before entering comedy full-time.

== Comedy and television career ==
In 1979, Green became a member of the Toronto-based sketch-comedy troupe The Frantics, with Paul Chato, Dan Redican and Peter Wildman. The group had a regular CBC radio series, Frantic Times, and later starred in the CBC Television sketch series Four on the Floor, which aired weekly from January to August 1986.

Green later worked on several Canadian television series. The Governor General of Canada describes him as known for his work with The Frantics and on the award-winning television series The Red Green Show, History Bites and Prisoners of Gravity. The Canadian Communications Foundation notes that Green later "made his mark as Bill" on The Red Green Show.

In 2024, Green supplied the lead voice in the animated short Roaches by Canadian writer/director David Creighton.

== ADHD advocacy ==
Green was diagnosed with ADHD as an adult and later became an advocate for ADHD awareness and education. In 2009, he wrote and directed ADD & Loving It?!, a documentary featuring comedian Patrick McKenna. The film won a New York Festivals award and Green received the CAMH Foundation Celebrity Transforming Lives Award for 2009.

== Honours ==
Green was invested into the Order of Ontario in 2015. In 2017, he was appointed a Member of the Order of Canada for "his contributions to Canadian television as a comedian, actor and writer, and for his efforts to raise awareness and understanding of Attention Deficit Hyperactivity Disorder (ADHD)."

== See also ==
- List of University of Waterloo people
- The Red Green Show
