= Peter Wildman =

Canadian actor (born 1950)

- Born: May 22, 1950 (age 76); Peterborough, Ontario, Canada
- Occupations: Actor, writer, musician
- Years active: 1978–present

Peter Wildman (born May 22, 1950) is a Canadian actor, writer, and member of the Frantics comedy troupe. He is known for playing Buzz Sherwood on The Red Green Show and for voice roles including Mojo in X-Men: The Animated Series and Mr. Fixit in The Busy World of Richard Scarry. He was also a writer on The Red Green Show from 1994 until 1998.

Wildman's television credits include appearances on Babar, Piggsburg Pigs!, Transformers: Cybertron, Shining Time Station, Peep and the Big Wide World, Puppets Who Kill, The Avengers: United They Stand, Street Legal, Rupert, Four on the Floor, RoboRoach, Undergrads, Wild C.A.T.s, History Bites, Little Bear, Free Willy, Highlander: The Animated Series, Cadillacs and Dinosaurs, Flash Gordon, Ace Ventura: Pet Detective, Dog City, Cyberchase, Freaky Stories, Tales from the Cryptkeeper, Anatole, Rescue Heroes, Storm Hawks, Committed, Mr. Men and Little Miss, Little Mosque on the Prairie, Grossology, Ace Lightning, Bob and Margaret, Ned's Newt, The Adventures of Sam & Max: Freelance Police, John Callahan's Quads!, Blazing Dragons, The Berenstain Bears, Birdz, Pippi Longstocking, Noddy, Silver Surfer, Second City Television, and Murdoch Mysteries.

Outside his acting and comedy work, Wildman is manager of creative services and a long-time senior writer at Corus Entertainment. His work there includes writing commercials, promos, song parodies, and comedy material for Corus radio stations, as well as occasional on-air performance.

Before joining the Frantics, Wildman worked as a part-time truck driver and appeared as an extra on early episodes of SCTV.

== Television credits ==
Television
Year	Title	Role	Notes
1991–1997	The Red Green Show	Buzz Sherwood	38 episodes
1992–1997	X-Men: The Animated Series	Mojo	2 episodes
1994–1996	The Busy World of Richard Scarry	Mr. Fixit, Rudolph von Flugel, Sniff, Pickles, additional voices	
1996	Buck Staghorn's Animal Bites	Buck Staghorn	
2004–2011	Peep and the Big Wide World	Squirrel	Main role 11 episodes
