= Eric Peterson =

Canadian stage, television and film actor

Eric Peterson CM
- Born: October 2, 1946 (age 79); Indian Head, Saskatchewan, Canada
- Occupation: Actor
- Years active: 1971–present
- Spouse: Annie Kidder
- Children: 2
- Awards: Best Ensemble Performance in a Comedy Program or Series; 2007 Corner Gas (shared); Best Performance by an Actor in a Continuing Leading Dramatic Role; 1992 Street Legal; Best Performance by an Actor in a Continuing Dramatic Role; 1989 Street Legal; Best Performance by an Actor in a Continuing Dramatic Role; 1987 Street Legal; 2008 ACTRA Toronto Award of Excellence For a significant body of work and union activism 2013 Governor General's Performing Arts Award

Eric Neal Peterson CM (born October 2, 1946) is a Canadian stage, television, and film actor, known for his roles in three major Canadian television series – Street Legal (1987–1994), Corner Gas (live-action 2004–2009 and film 2014, animated 2018–2021), and This is Wonderland (2004–2006).

== Career ==
=== Stage ===
In 1971, Peterson began his acting career when he helped found the collective theatre company Tamahnous Theatre in Vancouver, British Columbia. There he received major roles in versions of The Bacchae and Nijinsky, both directed by John Gray.

In 1974, he moved to Toronto, Ontario, and joined Theatre Passe Muraille, a leading collective ensemble in Canada. He had main roles in productions of The Farm Show, The West Show, Them Donnelly’s, and 1837: The Farmers' Revolt. It was in this latter Rick Salutin production that he gained the greatest recognition, playing William Lyon Mackenzie and Lady Backwash.

In 1976, Peterson began to collaborate with John Gray again, writing Billy Bishop Goes to War. The play, which premiered in Vancouver in 1978, went on tour internationally, garnering positive reviews on Broadway, where Peterson won the Clarence Derwent Award for most promising performer, in London's West End. He was also nominated for Best Actor at the Edinburgh Festival Mainstage. In 1998, Peterson acted in the play once more at the Canadian Stage in Toronto.

Peterson's later stage appearances include Love and Anger at the Factory Theatre, Health (another collaboration with John Gray) at the Vancouver Playhouse and the lead role in Richard Ill at the Young People’s Theatre. In October 2000, he performed in Hysteria at the Canadian Stage and in January 2001, he appeared in Clout at the National Arts Centre in Ottawa.

Between November 20 and December 13, 2008, Peterson starred as family patriarch and business man Helge Klingenfeldt in The Company Theatre's production of Festen at the Berkeley Street Theatre in Toronto, Ontario, Canada.

Between August 8 and 29, 2009, Peterson reprised the lead role in Billy Bishop Goes to War at the Soulpepper Theatre Company in Toronto. The company announced that the production was planned to return in 2010. In the same year, he played Wiff Roach in Soulpepper's revival of David French's 1973 play Of the Fields, Lately.

In the early to mid 2010s he played the role of Percy Schmeiser in the docu-drama play Seeds.

=== Television ===
Until Corner Gas, his best known role on television was his award-winning turn as Leon Robinovitch, a left-wing lawyer, on Street Legal. His more notable television work includes 1998's Nothing Sacred (a movie for which he also co-produced and appeared in the stage version), Night Heat and This Is Wonderland. He also appeared as Hank Stewart in the Hippocratic Oath episode of Alfred Hitchcock Presents for AHF Film Productions.

In total, Peterson has appeared in fifty-two movie and television productions. He also appeared in an infomercial for Amnesty International. He also appeared in the Goosebumps episode "Shocker on Shock Street" as Mr. Wright

Peterson's most famous television role was that of Oscar Leroy on the Canadian television program Corner Gas. Peterson played the father of Brent Leroy (played by Brent Butt), who inherited the gas station after his father decided to retire. Much to the dismay of his son and his wife Emma (played by Janet Wright), he uses his new-found free time to unwittingly annoy his family and the town at large. Following the end of that show's run, Peterson made a guest appearance on the show Dan for Mayor, a show starring his former Corner Gas co-star Fred Ewanuick. As of 2014 he appears in The Best Laid Plans as Jerry Stockton.

Since January 2007, he has been performing in Half Life, a play by John Mighton, at the Canadian Stage. According to The Canadian Encyclopedia, "his fresh, energetic, natural acting style has made him popular with Canadian audiences, and he continues to be a mainstay of Canadian television."

== Personal life ==
Peterson was born in Indian Head, Saskatchewan, Canada. He is married to fellow actor and People for Education executive director Annie Kidder, who is the sister of Margot Kidder. Peterson and his wife live in Toronto, Ontario, with their two daughters, although he still frequents his home province of Saskatchewan, where he owns a cottage on Katepwa Lake in the Qu'Appelle Valley near his hometown.

=== Awards ===
Peterson has won numerous awards over his career. For his portrayal of Leon Robinovitch on Street Legal, he was nominated for the Gemini Award for Best Performance by a Lead Actor in a Continuing Dramatic Role six times: in 1987, 1989, and every year from 1992 through 1995. He tied for the win with Winston Rekert (for Adderly) the first year, and won the next two outright. He has also been nominated twice under Best Ensemble Performance in a Comedy Program or Series with Corner Gas at the Gemini Awards, and once for Best Performance by an Actor in a Featured Supporting Role in a Dramatic Series for Episode 4 of This is Wonderland for his portrayal of Judge Malone. His fourth Gemini Award came in 2001 for Best Performance in a Pre-School Program.

He has also been nominated four times for Canadian Comedy Awards for his role on Corner Gas. In 2004, he was nominated (alongside fellow Corner Gas actor Brent Butt) in the "Pretty Funny Television Performance – Male" category. In 2007, he was nominated for "Best Male Performance."

In 1996, Peterson received an honorary Doctor of Letters in drama from the University of Saskatchewan; the head of the drama department, Henry Woolf, made the presentation. In 1999, the 20th anniversary edition of his play Billy Bishop Goes To War won him Dora Awards for Best Play, Best Direction, and Best Performance. He had previously received a Dora Award nomination for his role in Escape from Happiness. A 1982 CBC television adaptation garnered him an ACTRA award nomination. In May 2013 he received a Governor General's Performing Arts Award for his work for his lifetime contributions to Canadian theatre. For his lifelong contributions to the arts he received an Honorary Doctorate of Fine Arts from the University of Regina (2019).

== Filmography ==
=== Film ===
Film
Year	Title	Role	Notes
1974	The Visitor	Michael Tyler	
1983	The Kid Who Couldn't Miss	Billy Bishop / Walter Bourne	Writer
1984	The Painted Door	Steven	Short
1985	The King of Friday Night		
1986	The Last Season	Father Schula	
1987	Docudrama: Fact and Fiction	Billy Bishop / Walter Bourne	Archive footage
1991	Thick as Thieves	Judge Head	
1994	Henry & Verlin	Lovejoy	
1995	Bach's Fight for Freedom	Duke Wilhelm Ernst	
1996	Spill	Eric Black	
1998	The Sleep Room	Sal Rothenberg	
1998	Earth	Mr. Rogers	
1998	Sleeping Dogs Lie	Jack Doughty	
2001	Franklin's Magic Christmas	Grandfather Turtle	Voice; Direct-to-video
2002	Fairytales and Pornography	Kyle	
2013	Cas & Dylan	Jack	
2013	Canadian Famous	Himself	Documentary short
2014	Corner Gas: The Movie	Oscar Leroy	
2015	Canadian Star	Himself	Documentary short
2015	Painted Land: In Search of the Group of Seven	A.Y. Jackson	Voice
2016	Where the Universe Sings	A.Y. Jackson	Voice
2018	His Master's Voice	Hogarth	
2020	You Will Still Be Here Tomorrow	Frank	Short film
2020	The Death of Father Christmas	Father Riley	
2021	Defining Moments	Edward	
2021	Sprite Fright	Elder Sprite	Voice; Short film
2022	Junior's Giant	Junior	Short film
2023	Jerry Rigged	Gerald Slate	Short film
TBA	Cut the Painter		Pre-production

=== Television ===
Television
Year	Title	Role	Notes
1982	Billy Bishop Goes to War	Billy Bishop / Various	TV film
1985	Tramp at the Door	Lemieux	TV film
1985	The Park is Mine	Mike	TV film
1985	Ewoks	Teebo	Voice; 5 episodes
1985	Star Wars: Droids		Voice; 6 episodes
1986	Mr. Belvedere		Season 2, episode 18: "Valentines Day"
1986	The Care Bears Family	Noble Heart Horse	Voice; 13 episodes
1987–1994	Street Legal	Leon Robinovitch	126 episodes
1988	Night Heat	Matt Semple	Season 4, episode 3: "Ain't No Cure for Love"
1988	Alfred Hitchcock Presents	Hank Stweart	Season 3, episode 7: "Hippocritic Oath"
1994–1995	The Adventures of Dudley the Dragon	The Leprechaun	Season 2, episode 6: "Dudley and the Leprachaun"; Season 3 episode 3: "The Tree House"
1994	Scales of Justice	Judge	Episode "L'Affaire Belshaw"
1995	Deadly Love	Elliott	TV film
1996	Captive Heart: The James Mink Story	Reverend Eli Brennemen	TV film
1996	Kung Fu: The Legend Continues		Season 4, episode 12: "Escape"
1996	Dangerous Offender: The Marlene Moore Story	Dr. Spring	TV film
1997	PSI Factor: Chronicles of the Paranormal	O.S.I.R. Psychologist Owen Wiliston	Season 1, episode 18: "The Fog/House on Garden Street"
1997	Goosebumps	Mr. Wright	Season 3, episode 1: "A Shocker on Shock Street"
1997	La Femme Nikita	Zoran Bruner	Season 1, episode 21: "Verdict"
1997	I'll Be Home for Christmas	Dave	TV movie
1997	Traders	Joe Fitzpatrick	3 episodes
1998	Lost Universe	Jess	Voice; English version
1998	Nothing Sacred		TV film
1999	Big Wolf on Campus	Mr. Tock	Season 1, episode 16: "Time and Again"
1999	Win, Again!	Cliff	
2000	The Moving of Sophia Myles	Lester	TV film
2001	A Colder Kind of Death	Howard Downey	TV film
2001	Canada: A People's History	William Lyon MacKenzie King	3 episodes
2001	A Wind at My Back Christmas	Professor Coburn	TV film
2002	The Many Trials of One Jane Doe	Dr. Daniels	TV film
2002	The Stork Derby	Max MacLeod	TV film
2002	Trudeau	Tommy Douglas	TV film
2002	Street Time	Monty	Season 1, episode 12: "Betrayal"
2002	Puppets Who Kill	Mr. Quigley	Season 1, episode 12: "Mr. Quigley, the Asshole Next Door"
2003	Sounder	Vet	TV film
2003	Do or Die	Henry Chesser	TV film
2003	Jasper, Texas	Old Mr. King	TV film
2003	Tom Stone	Professor Vernon Day	Season 1, episode 12: "Now You See Him"
2003	Doc	Kyle's Dad	Season 4, episode 8: "Swing Shift"
2004	Blue Murder	Phillip Carlyle	Season 4, episode 8: "Upstairs Downstairs"
2004–2006	This Is Wonderland	Judge Malone	39 episodes
2004–2009	Corner Gas	Oscar Leroy	Main role; 107 episodes
2005	Untold Stories of the ER	Reenactment	Season 1, episode 8: "I Need Some Help Here"
2005	Slings & Arrows	Gavin Gilchrist	6 episodes
2005	Trudeau II: Maverick in the Making	Tommy Douglas	TV film
2005	Microkillers	Captain Wilcox	Episode: "Ebola"
2009–2014	The Ron James Show	'Black' Amos / Sir John A. MacDonald	4 episodes
2009	It's Been a Gas	Himself / Oscar Leroy	
2010	Republic of Doyle	Eli Kent	Season 1, episode 7: "The Woman Who Knew Too Little"
2010	Murdoch Mysteries	Hershey Dillard	Season 3, episode 11: "Hangman"
2010	Billy Bishop Goes to War	Billy Bishop	TV film Writer
2010	Eco Home Adventures	Himself	Documentary short
2011	Dan for Mayor	Lenny-Man	Season 2, episode 7: "The Art of Gambling"
2011	Wingin' It	Charles Dickens	Season 2, episode 9: "Carl+Alt+Delete"
2011	Wishing Well		TV film
2011	The Casting Room	Himself	Season 1, episode 1: "Eric Peterson"
2012	Sunshine Sketches of a Little Town	Jeff Thorpe	TV film
2013	Copper	Reverend William Remington	2 episodes
2013	Rookie Blue	Archie	Season 4, episode 8: "For Better, for Worse"
2013	Cracked	Ed Janoski	Season 2, episode 5: "The Hold Out"
2014	The Best Laid Plans	Jerry Stockton	Miniseries
2015	Young Drunk Punk	Rudolph	Season 1, episode 9: "First Date Funeral"
2015	The Plateaus	Mick Donald	Episode #1.7
2016	Valentine Ever After	George	TV film
2017	What Would Sal Do?	Harold	Episode "Vince's Uncle"
2017–2019	True and the Rainbow Kingdom	Rainbow King	Voice; 13 episodes
2017–2018	Hard Rock Medical	Dr. Kesler	7 episodes
2018–2021	Corner Gas Animated	Oscar Leroy	Voice; Main role; 48 episodes
2019	The Umbrella Academy	Al	2 episodes
2019	Sydney to the Max	Don	2 episodes
2019	American Gods	The Caretaker	4 episodes
2019	Dino Dana	Grandpa	2 episodes
2019	Street Legal	Leon Robinovitch	2 episodes
2019	Claws of the Red Dragon	James McAvoy	TV film
2020	True: Terrific Tales	Rainbow King	2 episodes
2020	True: Friendship Day		TV movie
2021	Private Eyes	Jasper Dazzle	Season 4, episode 12: "Drop Dead Carny"
2021	Chapelwaite	Samuel Gallup	7 episodes
2022	Ruby and the Well	Lou Aberlard	Season 2, episode 9: "I Wish I Could Stop Hurting"
2023	SurrealEstate	Andrew Tolliver	Season 2, episode 3: "The Butler Didn't"
2023	'Twas the Text Before Christmas	Carter	TV film

== Awards and nominations ==
Eric Peterson awards and nominations
Awards and nominations
Award	Wins	Nominations
Totals
ACTRA Awards	3	3
Canadian Comedy Awards	1	4
Canadian Film Fest	1	1
Clarence Derwent Awards	1	1
Dora Mavor Moore Awards	1	7
Gemini Awards	5	11
Governor General's Performing Arts Award	1	1
NSI Online Short Film Festival	1	1
Vancouver Badass Film Festival	0	1
Wins	13
Nominations	32

Year	Nominated work	Award	Category	Result	Ref.
1980	Billy Bishop Goes to War	Clarence Derwent Awards (United States)	Most Promising Actor	Won	
1986	The Double Bass	Dora Mavor Moore Awards	Dora Mavor Moore Award for Outstanding Performance by a Male in a Principal Role – Play (Large Theatre)	Nominated	
1987	Street Legal	Gemini Awards	Gemini Award for Best Performance by an Actor in a Continuing Leading Dramatic Role	Won in a tie with Winston Rekert	
1989	Street Legal	Gemini Awards	Gemini Award for Best Performance by an Actor in a Continuing Leading Dramatic Role	Won	
1992	Street Legal	Gemini Awards	Gemini Award for Best Performance by an Actor in a Continuing Leading Dramatic Role	Won	
1993	Street Legal	Gemini Awards	Gemini Award for Best Performance by an Actor in a Continuing Leading Dramatic Role	Nominated	
1994	Street Legal	Gemini Awards	Gemini Award for Best Performance by an Actor in a Continuing Leading Dramatic Role	Nominated	
1995	Street Legal	Gemini Awards	Gemini Award for Best Performance by an Actor in a Continuing Leading Dramatic Role	Nominated	
1998	The Designated Mourner	Dora Mavor Moore Awards	Dora Mavor Moore Award for Outstanding Performance by a Male in a Principal Role – Play (Large Theatre)	Won	
1999	Billy Bishop Goes to War	Dora Mavor Moore Awards	Dora Mavor Moore Award for Outstanding Performance by a Male in a Principal Role – Play (Large Theatre)	Nominated	
1999	Billy Bishop Goes to War	Dora Mavor Moore Awards	Dora Mavor Moore Award for Outstanding Direction of a Play	Nominated with John Gray	
2003	Boy Gets Girl	Dora Mavor Moore Awards	Dora Mavor Moore Award Outstanding Performance in a Feature Role in a Play or Musical	Nominated	
2004	Corner Gas	Canadian Comedy Awards	Best Performance by a Male - Television	Nominated	
2004	Corner Gas for episode "Face Off"	Gemini Awards	Gemini Award for Best Ensemble Performance in a Comedy Program or Series	Nominated	
2004	This is Wonderland for episode "Episode Four"	Gemini Awards	Gemini Award for Best Performance by an Actor in a Featured Supporting Role in a Dramatic Series	Nominated	
2005	Half Life	Dora Mavor Moore Awards	Dora Mavor Moore Award for Outstanding Performance by a Male in a Principal Role – Play (Large Theatre)	Nominated	
2006	Corner Gas	Canadian Comedy Awards	Best Performance by a Male - Television	Nominated	
2006	Corner Gas for episode "Merry Gasmass"	Gemini Awards	Gemini Award for Best Ensemble Performance in a Comedy Program or Series	Nominated	
2007	Corner Gas	Canadian Comedy Awards	Best Performance by a Male - Television	Won	
2007	Corner Gas for episode "Gopher It"	Gemini Awards	Gemini Award for Best Ensemble Performance in a Comedy Program or Series	Nominated	
2008	Eric Peterson	ACTRA Awards	Award of Excellence	Won	
2008	Corner Gas	Canadian Comedy Awards	Best Performance by a Male - Television	Nominated	
2009	Eric Peterson	Gemini Awards	Earl Grey Award	Won	
2010	Billy Bishop Goes to War	Dora Mavor Moore Awards	Dora Mavor Moore Award for Outstanding Performance by a Male in a Principal Role – Play (Large Theatre)	Nominated	
2010	Hamlet	Dora Mavor Moore Awards	Dora Mavor Moore Award for Outstanding Performance in a Featured Role/Ensemble in a Play or Musical	Nominated	
2012	Billy Bishop Goes to War	ACTRA Awards	Outstanding Performance - Male	Nominated	
2013	Himself	Governor General's Performing Arts Award	—N/a	Won	
2016	Static	Canadian Film Fest	Best Actor in a Short	Won	
2017	Static	Vancouver Badass Film Festival	Best Actor	Nominated	
2018	Static	NSI Online Short Film Festival	Brian Linehan Actors Award	Won	
2023	Junior's Giant	Canadian Film Festival	Best Performance in a Short Film	Won	
2023	Junior's Giant	ACTRA Award	Outstanding Performance, Male or Gender Non-Conforming	Won	
