= Love and Other Dilemmas =

- Directed by: Larry Di Stefano
- Written by: Deborah Peraya
- Produced by: Clare Hodge
- Starring: Gabrielle Miller; John Cassini; Stephen Lobo; Janet Wright; Fred Ewanuick
- Cinematography: Michael Wale
- Edited by: Jeanne Slater
- Music by: Budge Schachte
- Distributed by: Maple Pictures
- Release dates: October 10, 2006 (Vancouver International Film Festival); February 1, 2008 (Canada)
- Running time: 88 minutes
- Country: Canada
- Language: English

Love and Other Dilemmas is a 2006 comedy film directed by Larry Di Stefano. It premiered at the 2006 Vancouver International Film Festival and was released theatrically in Canada in February 2008 by Maple Pictures. The film's credibility is notably attributed to having three regular Corner Gas actors, Gabrielle Miller, Fred Ewanuick, and Janet Wright.

== Plot ==
It's Ginger Shapiro's wedding day. It's going to be perfect even though she's eight months pregnant, been robbed, kidnapped and thinks her fiancé Henry is dead—he's not—and then there's her grandmother's curse! It's a race to the altar in this escalating comedy of errors where Ginger and Henry might just stand a chance of living happily ever after.

== Cast ==
- Gabrielle Miller as Ginger Shapiro
- John Cassini as Bart Ladro
- Stephen Lobo as Henry Diamond
- Fred Ewanuick as Emmett Matzdorff
- Janet Wright as Jojo Ladro
- Mark Acheson as Rocco
- Erin Karpluk as Lucy Ladro
- Alistair Abell as Frank Matzdorff
- Michael Puttonen as Big Pigeon
- C. Ernst Harth as Little Pigeon
