= C. Ernst Harth =

Canadian character actor

- Born: Cary Ernst Harth; February 2, 1970 (age 56); Galt, Ontario, Canada
- Occupation: Actor
- Years active: 1992–present

Cary Ernst Harth (born February 2, 1970) is a Canadian character actor.

== Life and career ==
Harth was born in Galt, Ontario, Canada. He got his first role of acting as a kindergartner when the drama club cast the school's largest child to play Santa in their Christmas pageant. Involved in community theatre and improvisational comedy during high school, it wasn't until he relocated to Vancouver in 1989 that he seriously pursued acting full-time. Prior to landing his first professional gig in a TV commercial for a food chain, Harth toured the semi-pro wrestling circuit in Canada's small towns and provinces as The Bible Thumper, adorned in black robes with a cross shaved on his head.

He made his professional acting debut in Green Dolphin Beat, a Spelling telefilm for Fox. He has since guest-starred in the black and white episode of The X-Files, been Saved on TNT, co-starred with Carmen Electra as her bodyguard, Eightball, in MTV's Monster Island, wrestled Beau Bridges in Hallmark's Voyage of the Unicorn and appeared in other television series such as Millennium, Harsh Realm, The Dead Zone and The Outer Limits.

On the big screen, Harth's credits include portraying Lowell Lee Andrews in the multi-awarded Capote (with Philip Seymour Hoffman), racing through downtown Vancouver with Ice Cube in Are We There Yet?, chasing Scooby and Shaggy as Miner 49er in Scooby Doo 2: Monsters Unleashed, Thir13en Ghosts, Say It Isn't So, Dreamcatcher, Camouflage, Dudley Do-Right, Excess Baggage, Smokin' Aces 2: Assassins' Ball and Dead Rising: Watchtower.

== Filmography ==
| Year | Title | Role | Notes |
|---|---|---|---|
| 1993 | Strangeview | Trucker | short film |
| 1993 | The Scarecrow and the Rainbow Kid | Neo-Nazi Trucker | short film |
| 1994 | Alien IV? | Ponech | short film |
| 1994 | Green Dolphin Beat | Giant | TV movie |
| 1994–1997 | The Froome Room | Mr. Alistair Q. Fink | TV series also co-writer |
| 1996 | Crash | Ted the Doorman | also known as Breach of Trust in the USA |
| 1997 | Excess Baggage | Trucker | |
| 1998 | Saving Grace | Horst Himmelferger | also co-producer |
| 1998 | Henry's Café | Large Man | short film |
| 1998 | Catch Me If You Can | Luther | TV movie also known as Deadly Game |
| 1998 | Zacharia Farted | Wayne Newton | |
| 1999 | Dudley Do-Right | Shane | |
| 1999 | Noroc | Ed | |
| 1999 | Little Boy Blues | Casino Guard | |
| 2000 | 2ge+her | Sea-Doo Dude | TV movie |
| 2000 | Blacktop | Club Manager | |
| 2001 | Ignition | Repairman | |
| 2001 | The Barber | Buffalo Sedwick | |
| 2001 | Voyage of the Unicorn | Olaf the Ogre | TV mini-series |
| 2001 | Camouflage | Tiny the Bearded Guy | |
| 2001 | Valentine | Doorman | |
| 2001 | Say It Isn't So | Mr. Campisi | |
| 2001 | Dark Water | Streeter | also co-producer production manager |
| 2001 | Thir13en Ghosts | The Great Child | |
| 2002 | Stark Raving Mad | Dirk | |
| 2003 | Tommy Chong's Best Buds | Bedroom Ghost | |
| 2003 | Dreamcatcher | Barry Neiman | |
| 2003 | National Lampoon's Barely Legal | Magazine Man | |
| 2003 | The Delicate Art of Parking | Bernie | |
| 2003 | Air Bud: Spikes Back | Phil | |
| 2003 | Tilt | John | short film also consulting producer |
| 2003 | Art History | Nathaniel Ipswitch | short film |
| 2004 | Monster Island | Eightball | TV movie |
| 2004 | Scooby Doo 2: Monsters Unleashed | Miner 49er | |
| 2005 | Are We There Yet? | Ernst | |
| 2005 | The Long Weekend | Gang Member | |
| 2005 | The Muppets' Wizard of Oz | Earl | TV movie |
| 2005 | Capote | Lowell Lee Andrews | |
| 2006 | Totally Awesome | Richie | TV movie |
| 2006 | The Entrance | Ronald Cooper | |
| 2006 | Love and Other Dilemmas | Little Pigeon | |
| 2007 | Trick 'r Treat | Giant Baby | |
| 2009 | Zombie Punch | Henry Morris | |
| 2009 | Space Buddies | Guard | |
| 2009 | Scooby-Doo! The Mystery Begins | Otis | |
| 2010 | Smokin' Aces 2: Assassins' Ball | Baby Boy Tremor | |
| 2010 | The Search for Santa Paws | Adventurer Guide | |
| 2010 | The A-Team | Crematorium Attendant | |
| 2010 | Battle of the Bulbs | Walter Duncan | TV movie |
| 2011 | Once Upon a Time | Abraham/Ogre/Burly Man | recurring role |
| 2012 | A Christmas Story 2 | Heating Guy | |
| 2014 | Scammerhead | Bruno Tornst | |
| 2015 | Dead Rising: Watchtower | Bonzo Zombie | |
| 2015 | Asterix: The Mansions of the Gods | Obelix | US English dub |
| 2017 | Haters Back Off | Taco Ta-Go Manager | TV series |
| 2018 | Asterix: The Secret of the Magic Potion | Obelix | English dub |
