= The Adventure Club =

- Film poster
- Directed by: Geoff Anderson
- Written by: Robin Dunne; Fred Ewanuick
- Produced by: Glenn Paradis; Shayne Putzlocher; Sara Shaak; Mark Montague
- Starring: Sam Ashe Arnold; Jakob Davies; Dalila Bela; Billy Zane
- Cinematography: Ken Krawczyk
- Edited by: Tim Thurmeier
- Music by: Todd Bryanton
- Production company: Trilight Entertainment
- Distributed by: IndieCan Entertainment
- Release date: October 8, 2016
- Running time: 88 minutes
- Country: Canada
- Language: English

The Adventure Club is a Canadian children's fantasy film, directed by Geoff Anderson and released in 2016. The film centers on Ricky, Bill and Sandy, three young kids who discover a magic box that grants wishes, and must protect it from Langley (Billy Zane), a greedy businessman who wants it to help him attain his dream of purchasing and redeveloping the local science centre.

The film's cast also includes Robin Dunne, Gabrielle Miller, Lorne Cardinal and Kim Coates. The screenplay was written by Dunne and Fred Ewanuick, and the film was produced in Saskatchewan in the fall of 2015.

It was distributed in Canada under a unique model, in which it received a one-day screening in several Canadian markets on October 8, 2016. Some of the proceeds from each screening were donated to the local chapter of the Boys & Girls Clubs of Canada.
