= Dan for Mayor =

- Genre: Sitcom
- Created by: Mark Farrell; Paul Mather; Kevin White
- Starring: Fred Ewanuick; Mary Ashton; Paul Bates; Benjamin Ayres; Laurie Murdoch; David Ferry; Suzanne Coy; Agam Darshi
- Country of origin: Canada
- No. of seasons: 2
- No. of episodes: 26

Production
- Executive producers: Mark Farrell; Paul Mather; Kevin White
- Producer: Susan Murdoch
- Production locations: Kitchener, Ontario; Waterloo, Ontario; Hamilton, Ontario
- Running time: 31 minutes

Original release
- Network: CTV; The Comedy Network
- Release: March 1, 2010 – August 28, 2011

Dan for Mayor is a Canadian television sitcom starring Fred Ewanuick that debuted on March 1, 2010 on CTV and The Comedy Network. It premiered the same night as Hiccups, a show created by Corner Gas star Brent Butt that also features fellow Corner Gas alumna Nancy Robertson. On June 7, 2010, both Dan for Mayor and Hiccups were renewed for a second season. The second season premiered on June 5, 2011. Neither show was renewed for a third season.

== Premise ==
The series stars Ewanuick as Dan Phillips, a slacker in his early 30s, who finds himself running for mayor of Wessex, a fictional city in Ontario, in the 2010 municipal elections, after a chance comment to his ex-girlfriend. When his opponent, incumbent mayor Bud, is hit by a bus and killed, Dan becomes the only mayoral candidate whereupon he reopens the candidacy for a fair race. In the show's second season, Dan takes office as the city's new mayor, finding himself woefully unprepared for the job.

The cast also included Mary Ashton, Paul Bates, Benjamin Ayres, Laurie Murdoch, David Ferry, Suzanne Coy, Agam Darshi, and Lara Jean Chorostecki.

The show also featured several cameo appearances by real-life mayors of Ontario cities, including Carl Zehr, Brenda Halloran, and David Miller.

== Filming locations ==
The series' location shooting took place in Kitchener, Waterloo, Ontario, and Hamilton, Ontario; recognizable locations include Kitchener City Hall (as Wessex City Hall) and the Huether Hotel (as Fern's Grill, Dan's workplace).

== Episodes ==
=== Season 1 (2010) ===
No.	Title	Directed by	Written by	Original release date	Prod. code
1	"The Blind Spot"	Ron Murphy	Mark Farrell, Paul Mather & Kevin White	March 1, 2010	101
After hearing that his ex-girlfriend is now engaged to another man, Dan tries to impress her by saying that he's running for mayor. Stuck with his lie, he now has to start a campaign. Unfortunately, he's new to the politics business, and has a lot to learn.
2	"Enter Wheel-O"	Brian Roberts	Mark Farrell, Paul Mather & Kevin White	March 8, 2010	102
Dan begins his campaign for mayor, but soon discovers that his friends have reservations about his political aspirations. Cameo appearance: Carl Zehr (Mayor of the City of Kitchener)
3	"Once More With Feline"	Brian Roberts	Mark Farrell, Paul Mather & Kevin White	March 15, 2010	103
Claire considers getting involved with Dan, or at least with his campaign, but only if he comes clean about an accident he had with a cat. Cameo appearance: Brenda Halloran (Mayor of the City of Waterloo)
4	"Inside the War Room"	Ron Murphy	Mark Farrell, Paul Mather & Kevin White	March 22, 2010	104
Dan decides he needs a campaign office to give himself credibility, meanwhile Claire struggles with a potential conflict of interest stemming from one of Mike's deals. Guest appearance: Greta and Janet Podleski
5	"An Engagement in Hell"	Ron Murphy	Mark Farrell, Paul Mather & Kevin White	March 29, 2010	105
Dan and Jeff attempt to gain the backing of a conservative business while Claire holds her engagement party.
6	"A Cruel Mattress"	Brian Roberts	Mark Farrell, Paul Mather & Kevin White	April 5, 2010	106
Dan and Jeff are busy campaigning when they are bullied by a mascot advertising mattresses who claims their spot on the sidewalk.
7	"The Symbol of Futility"	Brian Roberts	Mark Farrell, Paul Mather & Kevin White	April 12, 2010	107
Dan decides he needs a campaign symbol, but accidentally ends up with an ice scraper.
8	"The Disc Compact"	Ron Murphy	Mark Farrell, Paul Mather & Kevin White	April 19, 2010	108
Dan and Jeff get their hands on the campaign platform of their main opponent, but face a moral dilemma.
9	"The Podium Conundra"	Ron Murphy	Mark Farrell, Paul Mather & Kevin White	April 26, 2010	109
Jeff has trouble convincing the other mayoral candidates that Dan should take part in the upcoming televised debate.
10	"Revenge is Swifty"	Brian Roberts	Mark Farrell, Paul Mather & Kevin White	June 7, 2010	110
While taking part in the candidates' debate, Alan gets embroiled in a career-ending muffin issue. Jeff risks trouble at his own work. Guest appearance: David Miller
11	"A Cleanse Getaway"	Paul Mather	Mark Farrell, Paul Mather & Kevin White	June 14, 2010	111
Dan gets some unexpected help in the campaign that gets both him and Jeff into hot water; Claire deals with the fall-out from her decision about the wedding.
12	"A Date with Vengeance"	Kevin White	Mark Farrell, Paul Mather & Kevin White	June 21, 2010	112
With days to go before the election and hardly a "Dan for Mayor" lawn sign in sight, Dan gets some help on the campaign trail. Jeff gives Claire career advice.
13	"The Return of Wheel-O"	Ron Murphy	Mark Farrell, Paul Mather & Kevin White	June 28, 2010	113
On election day, Dan finds himself embroiled in a race with an unexpected competitor. Season finale. Guest appearance: John Wilson

=== Season 2 (2011) ===
No.	Title	Directed by	Written by	Original release date	Prod. code
14	"A Rink By Any Other Name"	Ron Murphy	Mark Farrell, Paul Mather & Kevin White	June 5, 2011	201
With the town of Wessex knowing that Dan didn't really win the election, Dan decides to show his leadership by naming the new arena after a local hockey great, but is dismayed to find that it's already been named for a recently deceased annoying philanthropist. Claire makes the decision to stay in Wessex rather than move to Vancouver, and starts up her own PR company.
15	"The Trash Compact"	Ron Murphy	Jenn Engels	June 12, 2011	202
With recycling in mind, Dan tries to revamp the garbage system already in place in Wessex; he makes a deal with a nearby city, but finds that politics is a trickier business than he had been led to believe.
16	"Awkward Speedoo"	David Weaver	Carolyn Taylor	June 19, 2011	203
With the city budget in mind, Dan cuts the police department's request for 50 Speedoos – personal mobility devices – and gets himself on the wrong side of the law when the Chief of Police finds out that he won't be getting his new toys. Dan, and everyone he knows, suddenly find themselves the subject of police scrutiny; Dan must turn to Mike and his mustache for help.
17	"Claire 2.0"	Brian Roberts	Carolyn Taylor	June 26, 2011	204
While trying to figure out how to spin a raise in taxes, Dan accidentally misspells a word at a spelling bee. Mike tries to make Claire jealous with similar girls.
18	"Mayors' Conference"	Paul Mather	Paul Mather & Mark De Angelis	July 3, 2011	205
Dan tries to fit in at a mayors' conference held in Wessex. Mike and Jeff compete to be Claire's go-to friend.
19	"Insane In The Bike Lane"	Ron Murphy	Mark Farrell, Paul Mather & Kevin White	July 10, 2011	206
Dan and Mike square off for the right to bicycle and rollerblade on city streets. Fern starts to sell nonalcoholic beer when the bar's liquor license is revoked.
20	"The Art Of Gambling"	Paul Mather	Carolyn Taylor	July 17, 2011	207
Dan hires an artist (Eric Peterson), to make a sculpture that will put Wessex on an art tour. Claire pretends to be a recovered problem gambler to get a client, and Mike becomes a problem gambler when Fern's gets a VLT.
21	"Pot Divorce"	Brian Roberts	Mark Farrell, Paul Mather & Kevin White	July 24, 2011	208
Dan makes an appearance at Fern's marijuana rally, and reveals he hasn't taken part, causing Fern to become upset with Dan. Mike deals with Claire's parents separating, and Claire is worried Dan needs space away from her.
22	"Political Liability"	David Weaver	Tim Mcauliffe	July 31, 2011	209
Dan appears at several mayor functions with Claire, where she embarrasses him by talking about herself. Mike convinces Jeff that Dan isn't spending valuable time with him, and abusing their relationship.
23	"Old Fort Wessex"	Kevin White	Kevin White, Tim Polley & Matt Doyle	August 7, 2011	210
The employees of Fort Wessex ask for more funding from the City, which Dan counters with lay-offs. Jeff tries to convince Fern there is a tunnel from the bar to the fort.
24	"Mayor for a Day"	Ron Murphy	Jenn Engels	August 14, 2011	211
A student from the high school becomes a mayor for the day, and the day quickly turns into a competition between the two. Claire tries to convince herself, and others, she is busy. Jeff and Fern earn the bar the title best bar in Wessex.
25	"Ethical Dilemma"	Ron Murphy	Mark Farrell	August 21, 2011	212
Dan deals with an unethical ethics commissioner, and Claire wants to use her relationship with the mayor to get a client. Jeff and Fern compete to be the best in customer service.
26	"Porktoberfest"	Ron Murphy	Jenn Engels & Mark De Angelis	August 28, 2011	213
After Wessex is named the fattest city in Ontario, and Dan reveals that he is a vegetarian, controversy is caused when Dan can not eat a bratwurst for a pork festival. Claire struggles to keep vegetarian for Dan. Guest appearance: Derek McGrath as Pork Council Chairman

== Awards and nominations ==
Year	Presenter	Award	Work	Result
2010	Gemini Awards	Best Comedy Program or Series	Dan for Mayor	Nominated
2011	Canadian Comedy Awards	Best Performance By an Ensemble - Television	Fred Ewanuick, Mary Ashton, Paul Bates, Benjamin Ayres, David Ferry - Dan for Mayor, Episode 110 ("Revenge is Swifty")	Nominated
