= Corner Gas Animated =

Canadian television series

- Genre: Animated sitcom
- Created by: Brent Butt
- Developed by: Mark Farrell; David Storey; Virginia Thompson
- Directed by: Mark Thornton; Todd Kauffman; Stephen Evans; Mateusz Garbulinski
- Starring: Brent Butt; Eric Peterson; Corrine Koslo; Fred Ewanuick; Gabrielle Miller; Lorne Cardinal; Tara Spencer-Nairn; Nancy Robertson
- Opening theme: "Not a Lot Goin' On" by Craig Northey and Jesse Valenzuela
- Ending theme: "My Happy Place" by Odds
- Country of origin: Canada
- Original language: English
- No. of seasons: 4
- No. of episodes: 48

Production
- Executive producers: Brent Butt; David Storey; Virginia Thompson; Randy Lennox
- Running time: 21–23 minutes
- Production companies: Smiley Guy Studios; Vida Spark Productions; Sparrow Media; Aslan Entertainment; Verite Productions

Original release
- Network: CTV Comedy Channel
- Release: April 2, 2018 – November 1, 2021

Related
- Corner Gas

Corner Gas Animated is a Canadian adult animated sitcom, created by Brent Butt. The series is a revival of the live-action sitcom Corner Gas, which was originally broadcast from 2004 to 2009. The show premiered on April 2, 2018, on The Comedy Network, and was carried over when the channel became CTV Comedy Channel one year later.

The fourth and final season premiered on July 5, 2021.

== Premise ==
The series follows the everyday lives of the residents of the fictional small town of Dog River, Saskatchewan. Though similar to the live-action series, the creators acknowledged that the animated format gave them opportunities to do stranger and more unrealistic things that the original series could not depict. For instance, cutaway gags in the animated version include a Mad Max spoof and a gory fight between a Sasquatch and a unicorn.

== Cast ==
All the original Corner Gas actors reprised their roles, with the exception of Janet Wright, who died in 2016. Actress Corrine Koslo was selected to voice Emma Leroy in Wright's place.

- Brent Butt as Brent Herbert Leroy
- Nancy Robertson as Wanda Dollard
- Eric Peterson as Oscar Leroy
- Corrine Koslo as Emma Leroy
- Fred Ewanuick as Richard Henry "Hank" Yarbo
- Gabrielle Miller as Lacey Burrows
- Lorne Cardinal as Sergeant Davis Quinton
- Tara Spencer-Nairn as Officer Karen Pelly
- Cavan Cunningham as Fitzy
- Rebecca Shoichet as Shirley
- Shannon Chan-Kent as 60's Girl #1, Alison, Lin, Lin hu, Bu-Hu,
- Kathleen Barr as Dora, Mavis, Helen, Tina, Queen Bee, Pregnant Woman #1, Middle Aged Woman, Woman's Voice
- Brian Drummond as Zeke, Impersonator #1, Man's Voice, News Broadcaster, Old Man Wilkie, Plasti-Potty Guy, Priest, Radio Announcer, Sasquatch, Trucker, Werewolf Guy, Ike
- Diana Kaarina as Kendra
- Vincent Tong as Audio Book Voice, Clown, Impersonator #2, Jason Steele, Kyle, Male Hipster, New Vacuum, Ravi, Won Hu
- Kevin Loring as Phil
- Omari Newton as Nate, Josh

== Seasons overview ==
Season	Episodes	Originally released	
Season	Episodes	First released	Last released
1	13	April 2, 2018	June 25, 2018
2	11	July 1, 2019	August 5, 2019
3	11	October 12, 2020	December 14, 2020
4	13	July 5, 2021	November 1, 2021

=== Season 1 (2018) ===
No. overall	No. in season	Title	Directed by	Written by	Original release date
1	1	"Bone Dry"	Mark Thornton and Todd Kauffman	Brent Butt	April 2, 2018
There is a food and gas shortage at Corner Gas, which causes panic in Dog River. Oscar is mad that Brent is taking too long to fill the tanks, so he decides to teach his son a lesson. Lacey takes advantage of the situation by offering the residents of Dog River unique recipes at the Ruby. Meanwhile, Wanda makes fuel out of cabbage.
2	2	"Squatch Your Language"	Mark Thornton and Todd Kauffman	Brent Butt	April 9, 2018
Wanda, Hank, and Lacey attempt to terrorize Brent with a Sasquatch hoax. Davis and Emma's obsession with the fantasy TV series Throne Strife forces Karen and Oscar to spend time together. Karen tries to find something Oscar likes to do, but discovers he likes being a cranky old man who complains. Oscar discovers Karen likes to complain and coaches her to become better at it.
3	3	"None of Your Beefwax"	Mark Thornton and Todd Kauffman	Josh Gal	April 16, 2018
Brent and the citizens of Dog River are annoyed when Lacey tries to make them eat local, but soon they have no choice when the town's deliveries are mysteriously tardy. Davis tries to train "guard bees" while Wanda sells homemade candles.
4	4	"Bait and Click"	Mark Thornton and Todd Kauffman	Brent Butt and Mike McPhaden	April 23, 2018
Wanda used to be the source of knowledge in Dog River, but feels the Internet is cramping her style. Wanda and Lacey entice the residents of Dog River with click bait texts. Lacey and Emma compete to see whose potato dish special at the Ruby is better. Oscar sets up bait shop across from Corner Gas to teach Brent a lesson. Davis and Karen use Hank in their training exercise that leads to chaotic results.
5	5	"Flush Photography"	Mark Thornton and Todd Kauffman	Diana Frances	April 30, 2018
Wanda accidentally clogs the town sewer system, forcing everybody to go to the bathroom in a porta potty. Hank creates competition to the porta potty by creating his own, only to have Karen and Davis use town bylaws to try and stop him from making money with it. Emma and Oscar try to have a photo taken. Guest star: Sarah McLachlan
6	6	"Shelter Skelter"	Mark Thornton and Todd Kauffman	Andrew Carr	May 7, 2018
After Hank watches a TV disaster movie, he and Oscar set out to build the ultimate shelter, while Emma and Fitzy review the town's emergency plans. Karen and Davis vie over who would be the best leader in an apocalypse scenario. When Emma witnesses Brent and Lacey arguing, she locks them in the cold storage room until they can settle their differences.
7	7	"A Scary Cat Graffiti"	Mark Thornton and Todd Kauffman	Josh Gal	May 14, 2018
Hank and Brent restore a vintage car, while Karen deals with a crazed stray cat. Emma and Lacey paint over graffiti.
8	8	"Rum Punch"	Mark Thornton and Todd Kauffman	Brent Butt and Diana Frances	May 21, 2018
Hank accidentally punches Brent, and they agree Brent can punch Hank back to settle the score. Oscar cancels the life insurance, while Lacey starts a fundraiser to help Wes' widow. Davis and Karen stumble upon a rum distillery outside of town and try to determine how illegal it is. Note: This episode is dedicated to Mike O'Brian, who played Wes Humboldt in the original series.
9	9	"Spy Me to the Moon"	Mark Thornton and Todd Kauffman	Brent Butt and Andrew Carr	May 28, 2018
Lacey and Brent go see the blue blood harvest eclipse, as Lacey wants to get a picture of it. Things go awkward in what was not a date. Wanda wants to get her hands on a book that Davis has before anyone else. Hank is suspicious about Oscar being nice to Emma.
10	10	"Retro Grade"	Mark Thornton and Todd Kauffman	Andrew Carr	June 4, 2018
Lacey does not want to get involved in the planning for the retro costume party, but the committee uses her ranting as ideas. Karen does not want to go as a costume partner with Davis. Emma finds Oscar's costume very attractive. Meanwhile, Wanda has fun making Brent and Hank compete to see which of the two is smarter.
11	11	"Smoke-a-Cola"	Mark Thornton and Todd Kauffman	Diana Frances	June 11, 2018
A new cola drink inspires Brent to workout, while Wanda finds herself attracted to a cardboard cutout of the cola's mascot. Oscar and Davis feud over minor lottery winnings. Lacey, Karen and Emma try to have a girls' night, but Hank constantly gets involved. Note: This episode is dedicated to Janet Wright, who played Emma Leroy in the original series.
12	12	"Sunny and Share"	Mark Thornton and Todd Kauffman	Andrew Carr	June 18, 2018
As the town gathers on the deck of the Ruby to watch the summer solstice, Hank keeps saving seats. Wanda must complete a psychology paper to be paid for an online blog. Brent starts selling Emma's special popsicles; to teach him a lesson, she gives him some of Oscar's instead, but does not get the reaction she hoped for. Karen and Davis struggle to share a gun.
13	13	"Zip-a-Dee-Broom-Bah"	Mark Thornton and Todd Kauffman	Dylan Wertz	June 25, 2018
Hank wants to build a zip line in town and Lacey and Brent help out so he doesn't get himself killed. Karen and Davis crack down on Dog River's "Free Corner"– the spot where everyone dumps stuff they don't want – much to the dismay of the locals. Meanwhile, Emma and Oscar score a free robot vacuum that Oscar befriends… that is until Wanda soups it up.

=== Season 2 (2019) ===
No. overall	No. in season	Title	Directed by	Written by	Original release date
14	1	"Dream Waiver"	Stephen Evans & Mateusz Garbulinski	Brent Butt & Meredith Hambrock	July 1, 2019
Brent keeps having nightmares of Michael J. Fox killing him. Oscar threatens to sue Lacey after getting injured on a step at the Ruby, but a lapsed policy causes concern. Hank tests Davis and Karen's first aid skills. Guest star: Michael J. Fox
15	2	"Drone and Dumber"	Stephen Evans & Mateusz Garbulinski	Brent Butt	July 1, 2019
Brent buys a drone and torments Oscar with it, while Hank attempts to get his hands on it. Davis taunts Karen's shooting skills. Wanda and Emma are trapped by a turkey.
16	3	"One Flu Over My Dead Body"	Stephen Evans & Mateusz Garbulinski	Andrew Carr	July 8, 2019
Karen and Davis discover a mannequin dumped in the woods and try to solve the crime; at Corner Gas, Brent surprises Wanda with a scanner; in the Ruby, Lacey, Oscar, Hank, and Emma get drawn into an unusual bet about hand sanitizer.
17	4	"Hedge Your Debts"	Stephen Evans & Mateusz Garbulinski	Diana Frances	July 8, 2019
Emma sees high art in Hank's hedge-trimming and sells his services around town; prompted by Oscar, Brent tries to collect on the IOUs piling up at Corner Gas, resorting to unorthodox means; Davis and Karen set up the cop shop in the Ruby.
18	5	"Paper Sashay"	Stephen Evans & Mateusz Garbulinski	Kate Hewlett	July 15, 2019
When Wullerton's weekly paper goes under, the gang worries the Dog River Howler will too; Wanda and Emma set out to recruit new advertisers, while Brent helps Oscar start an online version that raises eyebrows; Karen befriends a crow. Guest star: Justin Trudeau
19	6	"Oedipus Hex"	Stephen Evans & Mateusz Garbulinski	Diana Frances	July 15, 2019
Ike's barn burns down and Lacey wants to help; Lacey organizes a bachelor auction to raise money, attracting a mystery woman who bids high for Brent; the more time the two spend together, the more curious the town gets about the woman's identity. Guest star: Chris Hadfield
20	7	"Pioneer and Deer"	Stephen Evans & Mateusz Garbulinski	Brent Butt	July 22, 2019
Hank wants to change methods; Wanda uncovers a shocking truth about founding pioneer woman Jane T. Wright; Oscar tries to sneak into the fair despite being banned.
21	8	"Bush League"	Stephen Evans & Mateusz Garbulinski	Brent Butt & Meredith Hambrock	July 22, 2019
Wanda goes power mad; Davis and Karen make a dangerous bet; Oscar recalls "the incident" that made him give up the game for good; Brent and Hank are lost in the woods. Guest star: Russell Peters
22	9	"Tag You're I.T."	Stephen Evans & Mateusz Garbulinski	Diana Frances	July 29, 2019
Brent, Hank and Emma have a viral video contest; Karen and Davis try to GPStag the locals; Lacey asks Wanda to secure her WiFi. Guest star: Harley Morenstein
23	10	"Anger Games"	Stephen Evans & Mateusz Garbulinski	Andrew Carr	July 29, 2019
Wanda creates her dream video game; Lacey and Karen offer to help Davis release his pent-up stress; Oscar and Emma break out the crokinole board.
24	11	"Doctors Without Boarders"	Stephen Evans & Mateusz Garbulinski	Kate Hewlett	August 5, 2019
The locals are confused about Wanda's PhD; Lacey gets mistaken for a cool adult by teens; Oscar finds something sinister about Davis and Karen. Guest star: Jann Arden

=== Season 3 (2020) ===
No. overall	No. in season	Title	Directed by	Written by	Original release date
25	1	"Pink Flood"	Stephen Evans	Brent Butt, Jen Goodhue	October 12, 2020
When Davis forgets Karen's birthday, he rallies the gang to help him throw together a last-minute party with some unfortunate results. Meanwhile, Oscar reckons with the fact that he's terrible at giving gifts. Guest stars: Arcade Fire
26	2	"Remembers Only"	Stephen Evans	Brent Butt, Jennifer Siddle	October 12, 2020
Brent gets his own private VIP section at the bar. Hank loses his keys and enlists Lacey's help to retrace his steps. Wanda attempts to retrain Davis's memory. Guest star: Brett Kissel
27	3	"Pact Rat"	Stephen Evans	Andrew Carr	October 19, 2020
Fitzy appoints Wanda and Hank to the Special Rodents Unit to deal with the town's rat problem, annoying Lacey. Davis tries to hide how he crashed the police cruiser from Karen. Oscar and Emma uncover an old secret of Brent's while cleaning the shed.
28	4	"Sound and Fury"	Stephen Evans	Meredith Hambrock	October 26, 2020
Brent and Hank despair when their favourite wrestler turns to talking about gardening with Emma, making Oscar jealous. Wanda and Lacey fight over a smart speaker. Davis and Karen must explain a personal massager as part of the police expenses. Guest stars: Lance Storm, Bret Hart and Trish Stratus
29	5	"Float Your Vote"	Stephen Evans	Andrew Carr, Meredith Hambrock	November 2, 2020
Lacey plans a parade for Dog River Days with all the fixings and Wanda uses a mascot to convince a corporate sponsor to support the cause. Hank battles Emma for the beauty pageant crown. Guest star: Jason Priestley
30	6	"Lock n' Loaf"	Stephen Evans	Brent Butt, Meredith Hambrock	November 9, 2020
Brent can't figure out his new smart lock app, trapping Wanda and Hank in Corner Gas. Lacey tries to help Emma quit making special bread for Davis.
31	7	"Give Pizza Chants"	Stephen Evans	Jennifer Siddle	November 16, 2020
Davis tries to get Brent to join his rugby team, but Brent's more focused on inventing a new rugby chant. Hank and Karen convince Lacey to start selling pizza in The Ruby. Guest stars: Jay Onrait and Dan O'Toole
32	8	"Band Aid"	Stephen Evans	Brent Butt, Meredith Hambrock	November 23, 2020
The band Thunderface reunites but a song Brent wrote back in high school has Lacey investigating his mystery crush. Oscar shoots a fundraising video for the Seniors' Centre.
33	9	"Bliss and Make-Up"	Stephen Evans	Erica Sigurdson	November 30, 2020
Wanda repairs old junk of Hank's to re-sell at the community yard sale. Lacey tries to get Brent to join her in purging their unneeded possessions. Davis, Oscar and Emma become addicted to Karen's high-end beauty serums.
34	10	"The Fat and The Furious"	Stephen Evans	Andrew Carr	December 7, 2020
The Corner Gas parking lot becomes a drive-in putting Davis and Karen on high alert for potential criminal behaviour. Oscar and Emma take advantage, reliving their youthful friskiness. Lacey accidentally insults Brent, starting a prank war. Guest star: Andrea Martin
35	11	"Tinsel-itis"	Stephen Evans	Brent Butt, Andrew Carr	December 14, 2020
Brent & Lacey go to great lengths to find each other the perfect present. Hank gets conned into helping Oscar & Emma prep their annual party. Wanda goes to war with Davis and Karen over her extreme Christmas lights display.

=== Season 4 (2021) ===
No. overall	No. in season	Title	Directed by	Written by	Original release date
36	1	"Parachute the Messenger"	Stephen Evans	Jennifer Siddle	July 5, 2021
Brent and Wanda help Lacey overcome her fears so she can go skydiving; Hank becomes the town messenger; Oscar and Emma go to war with Karen and Davis over a prime potato planting locale. Guest star: Mark McKinney
37	2	"Mother Father Figure"	Stephen Evans	Meredith Hambrock	July 12, 2021
Wanda, Lacey and Karen team up to fix The Ruby's broken toaster. Emma and Oscar have an impression-off, while Davis is excited when he discovers Hank owns a valuable action figure.
38	3	"Snake and Eggs"	Stephen Evans	Brent Butt	July 19, 2021
Oscar's convinced there's a venomous cobra in his backyard. Hank discovers an intriguing bird's nest and sets up a livestream so everyone in town can watch the eggs hatch. Guest star: Steven Page
39	4	"Trust Find"	Stephen Evans	Andrew Carr	July 26, 2021
Brent discovers his parents put money aside for him, but Oscar's forgotten where it is; Karen and Davis are hurt to learn how often people lie to the police and enlist Wanda as their lie detector.
40	5	"A Lot to Be Desired"	Stephen Evans	Meredith Hambrock	August 2, 2021
Karen, Wanda, and Lacey struggle to get noticed on a dating app; Oscar, Emma, and Hank try to figure out who purchased the abandoned lot in town. Guest star: Tantoo Cardinal
41	6	"Law & Quarter"	Stephen Evans	Jennifer Siddle	August 9, 2021
Brent and Karen go to war over the antiquated laws in Dog River; Hank and Emma track down Oscar's prize quarter.
42	7	"The Fresh Prints of Bell Heir"	Stephen Evans	Dylan Wertz	August 16, 2021
When Dog River is given a town bell, the citizens can't agree how it should be used; Oscar and Emma become coffee snobs and Brent investigates Wanda's strange spy-like behavior. Guest star: Simu Liu
43	8	"Swing and a Mist"	Stephen Evans	Brent Butt and Erica Sigurdson	August 23, 2021
Karen and Davis try to uncover why Karen suddenly has violently angry feelings toward Hank; the citizens of Dog River are captivated by the Leroys' new swing; Brent, Wanda and Lacey butt heads over aromatherapy.
44	9	"A Maze-ing Taste"	Stephen Evans	Andrew Carr	August 30, 2021
Hank is upset when Wanda replaces him as Corn Maze designer at the Dog River Corn Festival; Emma and Oscar compete with Davis to see who can complete their volunteer task first; Brent and Lacey raise money by selling popcorn. Guest star: Rick Mercer
45	10	"Putt Putt Go"	Stephen Evans	Meredith Hambrock	September 6, 2021
Karen is tasked with playing an online phone game for Fitzy while Wanda and Hank settle a bet with mini putt. Emma fills in for Lacey in The Ruby.
46	11	"Plots and Plans"	Stephen Evans	Brent Butt and Kyah Green	September 13, 2021
Oscar is disturbed to learn he and Emma have different notions about their final resting place; Wanda becomes obsessed with a productivity app while Lacey and Hank talk Brent into renovations. Guest star: Kim Coates
47	12	"Haunt for Dread October"	Stephen Evans	Brent Butt and Andrew Carr	October 25, 2021
It's Halloween in Dog River and Brent, Lacey, Wanda, and Hank face a possible haunting at Brent's house. Oscar and Emma realize angry teenagers are targeting them for pranks and recruit Karen and Davis to help.
48	13	"Ruby Re-Burn"	Sean Janisse and Nathan Carey	Brent Butt and Andrew Carr	November 1, 2021
When The Ruby cafe suffers serious damage after a fire in the kitchen, Brent hopes Lacey's insurance will cover the cost quickly so that she can rebuild and re-open as soon as possible, but the situation forces her to confess to Brent that she isn't sure she wants to - and in fact, isn't sure she's going to remain in Dog River. Brent has to decide whether to convince her to stay, or do the right thing and let her make up her own mind unencumbered. But can he do that without knuckling under and spilling his true feelings for her? Meanwhile, unsure of what the future holds, the other characters each project where they see themselves in the years ahead - each prognostication more ridiculous than the other. Guest star: Ryan Reynolds

== Production and broadcast ==
Corner Gas Animated was first announced in December 2016. In June 2018, CTV Comedy Channel renewed the series for a second season.

The second season premiered on July 1, 2019, and featured several Canadian and international celebrities appearing cameos and guest spots; including Michael J. Fox, Jann Arden, comedian Russell Peters, Prime Minister Justin Trudeau, astronaut Chris Hadfield and Epic Meal Time's Harley Morenstein.

In October 2019, the show was renewed for a third season. It was also announced, on October 3, that Amazon-owned IMDb TV would exclusively stream the Corner Gas catalogue, including Corner Gas Animated, starting on October 15.

In June 2021, Brent Butt announced that the fourth season, to premiere on July 5, would be the final season, as CTV had chosen not to continue it in the future.

== Reception ==
The premiere episode of Corner Gas Animated, "Bone Dry", was The Comedy Network's highest premiere in history, with 360,300 viewers by that date. It was the number one entertainment program on April 2 in the demographics of A18-34, A18-49, and A25-54.

=== Awards and nominations ===
Corner Gas Animated awards and nominations
Awards and nominations
Award	Wins	Nominations
Totals
Canadian Screen Awards	8	21
Leo Awards	5	18
Rockie Awards	0	1
Wins	13
Nominations	40

Year	Award	Nominated work	Category	Result	Ref.
2019	Canadian Screen Awards	Corner Gas Animated	Best Animated Program or Series	Nominated	
2019	Canadian Screen Awards	Brent Butt ("Squatch Your Language")	Best Writing, Animation	Won	
2019	Leo Awards	Corner Gas Animated	Best Animation Program or Series	Won	
2019	Leo Awards	Brent Butt ("Squatch Your Language")	Best Screenwriting, Animation Program or Series	Nominated	
2019	Leo Awards	Andrew Carr ("Retro Grade")	Best Screenwriting, Animation Program or Series	Nominated	
2019	Leo Awards	Lorne Cardinal ("Squatch Your Language")	Best Voice Performance, Animation Program or Series	Nominated	
2019	Rockie Awards	Corner Gas Animated	Animation	Nominated	
2020	Canadian Screen Awards	Corner Gas Animated	Best Animated Program or Series	Won	
2020	Canadian Screen Awards	Brent Butt	Performance, Animation	Won	
2020	Canadian Screen Awards	Eric Peterson	Performance, Animation	Nominated	
2020	Canadian Screen Awards	Stephen Evans and Mateusz Garbulinski ("Bush League")	Direction, Animation	Nominated	
2020	Canadian Screen Awards	Diana Frances ("Hedge Your Debts")	Best Writing, Animation	Won	
2020	Canadian Screen Awards	Kate Hewlett ("Doctors Without Boarders")	Best Writing, Animation	Nominated	
2020	Leo Awards	Corner Gas Animated	Best Animation Program or Series	Nominated	
2020	Leo Awards	Brent Butt ("Drone and Dumber")	Best Screenwriting, Animation Program or Series	Won	
2020	Leo Awards	Andrew Carr ("One Flu Over My Dead Body")	Best Screenwriting, Animation Program or Series	Nominated	
2020	Leo Awards	Craig Northey ("Dream Waiver")	Best Musical Score Animation Program or Series	Nominated	
2020	Leo Awards	Lorne Cardinal ("Anger Games")	Best Voice Performance, Animation Program or Series	Nominated	
2021	Canadian Screen Awards	Corner Gas Animated	Best Animated Program or Series	Won	
2021	Canadian Screen Awards	Lorne Cardinal	Best Performance in an Animated Program or Series	Won	
2021	Canadian Screen Awards	Brent Butt and Jennifer Goodhue ("Pink Flood")	Best Writing, Animation	Nominated	
2021	Canadian Screen Awards	Brent Butt and Jennifer Siddle ("Remembers Only")	Best Writing, Animation	Nominated	
2021	Canadian Screen Awards	Andrew Carr ("Pact Rat")	Best Writing, Animation	Nominated	
2021	Leo Awards	Corner Gas Animated	Best Animation Series	Nominated	
2021	Leo Awards	Andrew Carr ("Pact Rat")	Best Screenwriting Animation Series	Won	
2021	Leo Awards	Brent Butt, Jennifer Siddle ("Remembers Only")	Best Screenwriting Animation Series	Nominated	
2021	Leo Awards	Craig Northey ("The Fat and The Furious")	Best Musical Score Animation Series	Nominated	
2021	Leo Awards	Nancy Robertson ("Float Your Vote")	Best Voice Performance Animation Series	Won	
2021	Leo Awards	Brent Butt ("Sound and Fury")	Best Voice Performance Animation Series	Nominated	
2022	Canadian Screen Awards	Corner Gas Animated	Best Animated Program or Series	Won	
2022	Canadian Screen Awards	Lorne Cardinal	Performance in an Animated Program or Series	Nominated	
2022	Canadian Screen Awards	Corrine Koslo	Performance in an Animated Program or Series	Nominated	
2022	Canadian Screen Awards	Eric Peterson	Performance in an Animated Program or Series	Nominated	
2022	Canadian Screen Awards	Tara Spencer-Nairn	Performance in an Animated Program or Series	Nominated	
2022	Canadian Screen Awards	Stephen Evans ("Haunt for Dread October")	Best Direction, Animation	Won	
2022	Canadian Screen Awards	Jennifer Siddle ("Law & Quarter")	Best Writing, Animation	Nominated	
2022	Canadian Screen Awards	Brent Butt and Kyah Green ("Plots and Plans")	Best Writing, Animation	Nominated	
2022	Leo Awards	Corner Gas Animated	Best Animation Series	Nominated	
2022	Leo Awards	Meredith Hambrock ("A Lot to be Desired")	Best Screenwriting Animation Series	Nominated	
2022	Leo Awards	Brent Butt and Erica Sigurdson ("Swing and a Mist")	Best Screenwriting Animation Series	Won	
