= The Delicate Art of Parking =

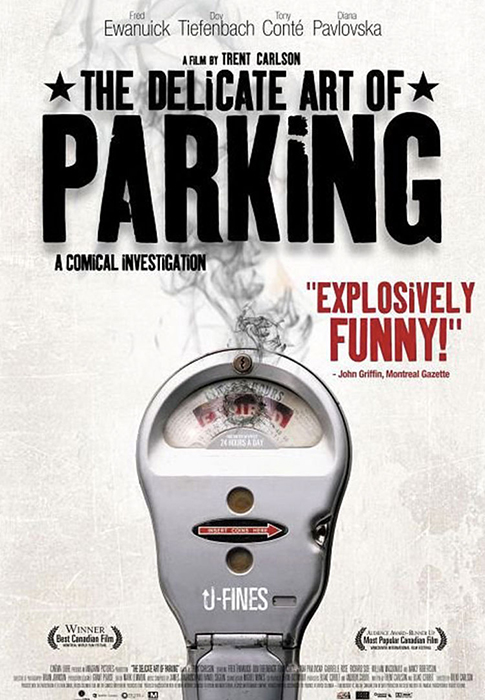
- Directed by: Trent Carlson
- Written by: Trent Carlson; Blake Corbet
- Produced by: Blake Corbet; Andrew Currie; Kevin Eastwood
- Starring: Fred Ewanuick; Dov Tiefenbach; Tony Conté; Diana Pavlovská; Gabrielle Rose; Richard Side; William MacDonald; Nancy Robertson
- Music by: James Jandrisch; Daniel Séguin
- Distributed by: Anagram Pictures
- Release date: May 14, 2003
- Running time: 87 minutes
- Country: Canada
- Language: English

The Delicate Art of Parking is a 2003 Canadian comedy/mockumentary film, directed by Trent Carlson, and produced by Blake Corbet, Andrew Currie and Kevin Eastwood.

It received numerous awards, including the Golden Zenith Award for Best Feature at the Montreal World Film Festival and Most Popular Canadian Film at the Vancouver International Film Festival. Fred Ewanuick and Nancy Robertson both star in this film. The next year, they would work together on Corner Gas, a sitcom that ran for six seasons, was acclaimed by critics and for which both actors won numerous accolades and awards.

== Plot ==
Lonny Goosen (Dov Tiefenbach) is a documentary filmmaker whose car just got towed. Together with his friend Gus (Andrew McNee) as his cameraman and Gus' cousin Olena (Diana Pavlovská) as their sound person, Lonny sets out to make a film about what people think about parking enforcers.

== Reception ==
The Delicate Art of Parking received positive reviews from film critics, with some calling the movie one of the best Canadian movies of 2003. On Rotten Tomatoes, it has a 78% score, based on 9 reviews. Ryan Cracknell of Movie Views gave the movie a positive review, stating "The Delicate Art of Parking is held together because of its strong characters. They're funny, they're quirky, and, most of all, they're realistic."

Fred Ewanuick was praised by most critics for his acting and his chemistry with the rest of the cast. He won the Peniscola Comedy Film Festival Award for Best Actor.

== Awards ==
The movie was nominated for a total of fourteen awards, winning five of them including the Montreal World Film Festival Award for Best Film from Canada and the Peñíscola Comedy Film Festival Awards for Best Film and Best Actor.
