= Fred Ewanuick =

Canadian actor

- Born: June 23, 1971 (age 55); Port Moody, British Columbia, Canada
- Occupation: Actor
- Years active: 1990s-present
- Awards: Best Ensemble Performance in a Comedy Program or Series; 2007 Corner Gas (shared) Peñsícola Comedy Film Festival Award Best Actor; 2004 The Delicate Art of Parking

Fred Ewanuick (/əˈwαnɪk/; born June 23, 1971) is a Canadian actor best known for his roles in the television series Corner Gas as Hank Yarbo and as the title character in the CTV sitcom Dan for Mayor. He was also a regular in a CTV anthology series, Robson Arms. Ewanuick starred in Nickelodeon's summer 2013 TV movie Swindle.

Ewanuick is also well known for his several award wins for the 2003 lead role in the comedy The Delicate Art of Parking, and reprised his role as Richard Henry "Hank" Yarbo in Corner Gas: The Movie, winning him a Gemini Award, and much praise. He also had roles in popular films including The Santa Clause 2, Just Friends, Young Triffie, and a romantic comedy with several other Corner Gas stars in Love and Other Dilemmas, and the disaster film Absolute Zero.

== Early life ==
Ewanuick was born and raised in Port Moody, British Columbia, Canada. He is of Ukrainian and Italian descent. Ewanuick's first job was a paper route, but he was fired for disposing of the newspapers in dumpsters as a "time saver". Ewanuick later worked in a bingo hall until his high school graduation from Port Moody Secondary School in 1989.

== Career ==
At college, Ewanuick enrolled in English, Women’s Studies, and Theatre courses, which were the only courses available, subsequently failing all three. After auditioning and being accepted into the two-year theater intensive program, he was asked to leave one year into the program. Ewanuick subsequently trained for four years with acting coach Shea Hampton, with whom he continues to study in Vancouver, British Columbia, where Ewanuick also resides.

Ewanuick made his television debut on The New Addams Family in 1998 as a "spinning gnome". Following guest appearances on both Canadian and American television series such as Cold Squad, Monk, Dark Angel, The Twilight Zone, Da Vinci's Inquest and Tru Calling, Ewanuick became a regular on the CTV series Corner Gas, as Hank Yarbo. The series was a hit, making him a familiar face in Canadian households. In 2005, he began starring simultaneously in the CTV comedy-drama series Robson Arms with Corner Gas co-star Gabrielle Miller.

Ewanuick has appeared in numerous films, including The Delicate Art of Parking (2003), which premiered at the Montreal World Film Festival. The film won the Best Canadian Feature prize. Later, he won a Best Actor award at Spain's Peñiscola Comedy Film Festival for the same film. In the comedy Young Triffie (2007), Ewanuick stars as a young Newfoundland Ranger investigating a crime. Originally, Ewanuick was not cast for the part, but the casting staff could not agree on whom to choose for the part. Ewanuick was called to audition for the part after being suggested because of his work on Corner Gas.

In late 2008, CTV commissioned a half-hour sitcom pilot for a new comedy titled Dan for Mayor, starring Ewanuick as Dan. Dan For Mayor was written by Mark Farrell, Paul Mather, and Kevin White. Ewanuick portrayed Dan, a 30-something bartender who lives and works in the fictional city of Wessex, Ontario. The series ended in 2011.

In 2013, Ewanuick played Paul Swindell in Swindle. The following year, he reprised his role as Hank Yarbo in Corner Gas: The Movie.

== Filmography ==
=== Film works ===
| Year | Film | Role | Notes |
|---|---|---|---|
| 2002 | Santa Clause 2 | Seismic Interpreter | |
| 2002 | The Bed | Young Man | |
| 2002 | Stark Raving Mad | Beck (Raverboy #2) | |
| 2002 | Beauty Shot | Dean | |
| 2003 | A Guy Thing | Jeff | |
| 2003 | Fluffy | Todd | short |
| 2003 | The Core | Endeavor Flight Engineer | Credited as Fred Ewanvick |
| 2003 | The Delicate Art of Parking | Grant Parker | |
| 2004 | Chestnut: Hero of Central Park | Kosh | |
| 2005 | Crossing | Alfie | |
| 2005 | Selling Innocence | James | |
| 2005 | Just Friends | Clark | |
| 2006 | Young Triffie | Ranger Alan Hepditch | |
| 2006 | Black Eyed Dog | Doug | |
| 2006 | Love and Other Dilemmas | Emmett Matzdorff | |
| 2011 | French Immersion | Colin | |
| 2013 | Swindle | Paul Swindell | |
| 2014 | Corner Gas: The Movie | Hank Yarbo | Reprise of role from 2004–2009 TV series |
| 2015 | Patterson's Wager | Charles | |
| 2016 | A.R.C.H.I.E. | Hugh | |
| 2019 | 37-Teen | Greg | |

=== Television works ===
| Year | Title | Role | Notes |
|---|---|---|---|
| 1999 | The New Addams Family | Gnome | 1 episode: "Cleopatra, Green of the Nile" |
| 2001 | The Chris Isaak Show | Food Service Worker | 1 episode: "Smackdown" |
| 2001 | Special Unit 2 | Bus Passenger | 1 episode |
| 2001 | Cold Squad | Todd Fernley | 1 episode: "Picasso's Mistake" |
| 2001 – 2002 | Dark Angel | Luke | 5 episodes: "Freak Nation", "Love Among the Runes", "She Ain't Heavy", "Some Assembly Required", "Two" |
| 2001 – 2003 | Da Vinci's Inquest | Raymond Ford, Paul Risi | 4 episodes: "Banging on the Wall", "Cheap Aftershave", "Ugly Quick", "You Got Monkey Chatter" |
| 2002 | Twilight Zone | Garrett | 1 episode: "Sensuous Cindy" |
| 2002 | Monk | Jake | 1 episode: "Mr. Monk and the Candidate: Part 1" |
| 2003 | Out of Order | Boom Operator | |
| 2003 | Behind the Camera: The Unauthorized Story of 'Three's Company' | Set assistant | |
| 2003 – 2004 | Tru Calling | Brian | 2 episodes: "The Longest Day", "Morning After" |
| 2004 | Dead Like Me | Xavier Boscacci | Season 2, Episode 2: "The Ledger" |
| 2004 | The Ranch | Tommy | |
| 2004 – 2009 | Corner Gas | Hank Yarbo | 107 episodes |
| 2005 – 2008 | Robson Arms | Nick Papathanasiou | 19 episodes |
| 2005 | Absolute Zero | Philip | |
| 2005 | Selling Innocence | James | |
| 2006 | Blood Ties | Wendell | 1 episode: Wrapped |
| 2006 | Intelligence | Narcotics Officer and Nichols | 2 episodes: We Were Here Now We Disappear, Not a Nice Boy! |
| 2006 | Air Farce | Hank Yarbo | 300th Episode Special; fictional crossover with Little Mosque on the Prairie and Trailer Park Boys |
| 2010 – 2011 | Dan for Mayor | Dan Phillips | |
| 2014 | Supernatural | Sheriff Len Cuse | Season 10, episode 8: "Hibbing 911" |
| 2015 | Dinotrux | Click Clack | Voice |
| 2018-2021 | Corner Gas Animated | Hank Yarbo | Voice |
| 2021 | Scaredy Cats | Sticky-Paws Fink | Voice |
| 2023 | The Irrational | Gene Hadditch | Season 1, episode 2" "Dead Woman Walking" |
| 2026 | Tracker | Scientist | 2 episodes: Chrono Stasis , The Best Ones |
| 2026 | Every Year After | Arthur Fraser | 3 episodes |

== Nominations ==
| Year | Award | Category | Film/Series | Notes |
|---|---|---|---|---|
| 2011 | Canadian Comedy Awards | Best Performance By an Ensemble – Television | Dan for Mayor | For the episode "Revenge is Swifty" |
| 2010 | Gemini Award | Best Comedy Program or Series | Dan for Mayor | |
| 2008 | Leo Award | Best Supporting Performance by a Male in a Feature Length Drama | Crossing | |
| 2007 | Gemini Award | Best Performance by an Actor in a Featured Supporting Role in a Dramatic Series | Robson Arms | For the episode "Saultology" |
| 2006 | Gemini Award | Best Ensemble Performance in a Comedy Program or Series | Corner Gas | Shared with the cast of Corner Gas for the episode "Merry Gasmas". |
| 2006 | Leo Award | Best Performance or Host in a Music, Comedy or Variety Program or Series | Corner Gas | Shared with the cast of Corner Gas for the episode "Wedding Card" |
| 2005 | Canadian Comedy Award | Television – Pretty Funny Male Performance | Corner Gas | |
| 2004 | Leo Award | Music, Comedy, or Variety Program or Series: Best Performance or Host | Corner Gas | For the episode "Cell Phone" |
