= Ray Guy (humorist) =

Canadian writer (1939–2013)

- Born: 22 April 1939; Come By Chance, Newfoundland, Canada
- Died: 14 May 2013 (aged 74)
- Education: Ryerson Institute of Technology
- Occupations: Journalist; humourist
- Writing career
- Language: English
- Subjects: Newfoundland, Joseph Smallwood
- Notable work: That Far Greater Bay
- Notable awards: Stephen Leacock Award Canadian National Magazine Awards

Ray Guy (22 April 1939 – 14 May 2013) was a Canadian journalist and humourist, best known for his satirical newspaper and magazine columns.

He was born in Come By Chance, Newfoundland, to George Hynes Guy and Alice Louisa Adams, but was raised and schooled in Arnold's Cove, the community that was to provide fodder for many of his columns.

Guy studied journalism at Ryerson Institute of Technology (now Toronto Metropolitan University). After graduation, he wrote for the St. John's Evening Telegram 1963–1974, and his columns also appeared in magazines such as Atlantic Insight, where he won the Canadian National Magazine Awards Toronto-Dominion Bank Award For Humour in 1980 and 1987, and the Newfoundland Quarterly. His output included political satire and humorous essays on Newfoundland outport life. His columns in the Evening Telegram often criticised the policies and ridiculed the excesses of Premier Joseph Smallwood, during a time where political opposition to Smallwood was ineffectual. In 1977, he received the Stephen Leacock Award for his collection That Far Greater Bay (1976).

In 1979, Gordon Pinsent created Up at Ours, a half-hour CBC St. John's television series that starred Mary Walsh as the owner of a boarding house and Ray Guy as the principal boarder. In 1985, Walsh appeared in and directed a stage play written by Guy, Young Triffie's Been Made Away With, which Walsh directed as a film in 2006, promoted in some markets under the shorter title Young Triffie.

Guy also appeared as a commentator on the CBC St. John's news program Here & Now. He was awarded an honorary doctorate by Memorial University of Newfoundland in 2001.

Ray Guy died of cancer on 14 May 2013. He was 74 years old.

== Publications ==
- (1975) You May Know Them As Sea Urchins, Ma'am
- (1976) That Far Greater Bay
- (1978) Outhouses of the East (photography by Sherman Hines)
- (1981) Beneficial Vapors [sic?]
- (1983) A Heroine for Our Time
- (1985) This Dear and Fine Country
- (1987) Ray Guy's Best
- (2008) Ray Guy: The Smallwood Years
- (2011) Ray Guy: The Revolutionary Years
