= Lowell Lee Andrews =

American convicted murderer (1940–1962)

- Andrews after his arrest in 1958
- Born: September 21, 1940; Wolcott, Kansas, U.S.
- Died: November 30, 1962 (aged 22); Kansas State Penitentiary, Lansing, Kansas, U.S.
- Occupation: Student
- Status: Executed by hanging
- Motive: Financial gain
- Conviction: First degree murder (3 counts)
- Penalty: Death

Lowell Lee Andrews (September 21, 1940 – November 30, 1962) was a University of Kansas student convicted of the murders of his parents and his sister on November 28, 1958, a crime for which he was later executed.

== Background ==
Andrews, a biology major who played bassoon in the college band, was described by his hometown newspaper as "The Nicest Boy in Wolcott". In reality, the 18-year-old entertained fantasies of poisoning his family and moving to Chicago, Illinois to become a gangster and professional hitman.

Andrews and his sister, Jennie Marie, were both home for the Thanksgiving holiday in 1958. Jennie Marie was watching television with her parents while Andrews was upstairs reading The Brothers Karamazov. When he finished reading the novel, Andrews shaved, put on a suit, and went downstairs carrying a .22 caliber rifle and a revolver. Walking into the room where his parents and sister were, Andrews turned on a light and opened fire with his rifle. He shot his sister, Jennie Marie, 20, between the eyes. He then turned the gun on his parents, shooting his father, William, 50, twice and mother, Opal, 42, three times. His mother moved toward him and he shot her another three times. His father attempted to crawl to the kitchen and was shot repeatedly with the revolver. Andrews fired a total of 17 shots into his father.

After opening a window in an attempt to make the crime look like a burglary, Andrews left the house and drove to the nearby town of Lawrence. He drove to his apartment to establish an alibi, claiming that he had needed to pick up his typewriter to write an essay, and then went to the Granada movie theater, where he watched Mardi Gras (1958), starring Pat Boone. When the film ended, he drove to the Kansas River, dismantled the weapons and threw them off the Massachusetts Street Bridge. He returned home and called the police to inform them of a robbery at his parents' house.

When police arrived, they noticed that Andrews seemed unconcerned over the massacre of his family. He protested his innocence until the family's minister, Pastor Vertio C. Dameron of Grandview Baptist Church in Kansas City, Kansas, was able to persuade him to confess. Andrews eventually confessed, later telling a reporter, "I'm not sorry and I'm not glad I did it. I just don't know why I did it, I didn't even feel anything as they died." It was determined that Andrews had killed his family to inherit the family property and had been planning the crime for months.

== Conviction and execution ==
Andrews pleaded not guilty by reason of insanity but was convicted and condemned to death. His request for clemency from Kansas Governor John Anderson, Jr. was dismissed. Despite further appeals, the U.S. Supreme Court let the conviction stand and the State of Kansas executed Andrews by hanging on November 30, 1962. He was 22 at the time of his execution, and his final meal consisted of two fried chickens with sides of mashed potatoes, green beans and pie à la mode. He gave no final words.

Andrews was on death row at the Lansing Correctional Facility at the same time as Richard Hickock and Perry Smith, murderers of the Clutter family and the subjects of Truman Capote's 1965 book In Cold Blood. Several pages in Capote's book concern Andrews, who was portrayed by C. Ernst Harth in the film Capote and Ray Gestaut in the film Infamous the following year. He was portrayed by Bowman Upchurch in the original film adaptation of In Cold Blood.

== See also ==
- Capital punishment in Kansas
- List of people executed in Kansas
- List of people executed in the United States in 1962

Preceded by Merle Martin Jr.	Executions carried out in Kansas	Succeeded by Richard Hickock
