= Corner Gas: The Movie =

- Theatrical release poster
- Directed by: David Storey
- Written by: Brent Butt; Andrew Carr; Andrew Wreggitt
- Based on: Corner Gas by Brent Butt
- Produced by: Virginia Thompson
- Starring: Brent Butt; Gabrielle Miller; Fred Ewanuick; Eric Peterson; Janet Wright; Tara Spencer-Nairn; Lorne Cardinal; Nancy Robertson; Don Lake; Reagan Pasternak; Graham Greene
- Cinematography: Ken Anton Krawczyk
- Edited by: Craig Webster
- Music by: Craig Northey
- Distributed by: Prairie Pants Distribution
- Release date: 25 November 2014 (Regina)
- Running time: 95 minutes
- Country: Canada
- Language: English
- Budget: $8.5 million
- Box office: $694,210

Corner Gas: The Movie is a 2014 Canadian comedy film directed by David Storey and is based on the television series Corner Gas (2004-2009). The film stars Brent Butt, Gabrielle Miller, Fred Ewanuick, Eric Peterson, Janet Wright, Lorne Cardinal, Tara Spencer-Nairn, Nancy Robertson, Cavan Cunningham, Gwen Seed and Jean Freeman all reprising their roles from the television series. The film also features new characters played by Don Lake, Reagan Pasternak, Graham Greene, Will Sasso and Karen Holness. The original series aired on CTV from 2004 to 2009.

The film gained a limited release, and was later released on DVD and Blu-ray. Fans of the television series reacted positively to the film, which led it to gain a cult following.

This was Janet Wright's final performance before her death in 2016.

== Plot ==
The film opens with perpetually unemployed Hank Yarbo dreaming about an armed robbery at Corner Gas, in which station owner Brent Leroy and retail clerk Wanda Dollard turn out to be robots, while the robber changes into a werewolf whom Wanda fights. Hank wakes up with a National Star judge in front of him at the Regina Airport. They depart for Dog River, where the town is in a riot. Hank proceeds to explain the events that caused the town to fall apart.

Five years after the original series finale, Mayor Fitzy has blown the town's money on a bad real estate investment in Detroit, leaving the town without electricity or water. A box that Sergeant Davis Quinton checked on his contract allows the town to force him to retire on his 25th anniversary of police service. He leaves Wanda to watch his house which, with its two diesel-powered backup generators, is the only place in Dog River with reliable electrical power. Wanda turns Davis' garage into an illegal bar and later a casino. Officer Karen Pelly, married and pregnant, begins issuing tickets in order to improve her stats and her job prospects should Dog River close and thus require her to find a job in another community's police department. Brent's father Oscar becomes a survivalist and trades his car for a horse-drawn cart, which is confiscated by Karen and repeatedly stolen back. An epiphany leads Davis to become a private detective and begin solving anything that he can determine to be a "mystery".

After realizing that the crisis won't blow over and Lacey Burrows, the owner of local diner The Ruby, will move away if Dog River goes bankrupt, Brent buys the closed town bar and enters Dog River into a "Quaintest Town in Canada" competition, hoping that the $75,000 prize can save the town. Brent's mother Emma invites Lacey and Brent to dinner to spark a romance in a bid to acquire grandchildren. Hank has a falling-out with Brent after Brent refuses to invest in his plan to bring a corporate Coff-Nuts franchise to Dog River, which would hurt Lacey's restaurant. After Lacey advises a Coff-Nuts representative named Jerome that the town is broke, a woman representing a company called CN Holdings attempts to convince the townspeople to sell their homes. Hank overhears the woman and Jerome scheming, so he takes Jerome to Dog River's rival town Wullerton in hopes that Coff-Nuts will change its plan and ruin the rival town. Davis receives word and pursues Hank. Hank abandons Jerome and runs into Davis before Wullerton's astonishingly friendly citizens drive the two back to Dog River. Both distracted—Brent by repairs to the bar, and Lacey by a quest to restore the town's electricity—Brent and Lacey forget to attend Emma's dinner.

At the bar, Jerome announces that CN Holdings, a Coff-Nuts subsidiary, intends to use the bankrupt town's infrastructure to build a regional distribution centre. However, as he leaves the bar, he suffers an injury, causing him to file a lawsuit against Brent. Wanda volunteers to represent Brent, but she loses the case, causing Corner Gas to be confiscated and the bar to be condemned.

Fitzy later returns with a plan to allow Wullerton to annex Dog River, which proves unpopular. Brent and Lacey then rally the town to prepare for the "Quaintest Town in Canada" contest judge, Tina Fuller, to enter Dog River, but a series of mishaps creates the appearance of a riot in the middle of town. Everyone then gathers at The Ruby, where Lacey encourages everyone to financially support Brent, but Brent declines their aid due to the judgment against him. Tina sympathizes with the town's predicament and writes an article to garner public support for Dog River. The media attention forces Coff-Nuts to drop the lawsuit. Between the proceeds from Wanda's casino, Karen's tickets, and a fundraising drive by residents of Wullerton, the town is saved. Catastrophe averted, Lacey and Brent kiss, shocking everyone at The Ruby. Oscar encourages Brent to ask Lacey out, but they reveal that they have been dating for two years. Emma rejoices at the prospect of grandchildren but is dismayed when Lacey and Brent reveal that they have decided against having children.

== Cast ==
All members of the regular television series cast reprised their roles for the film.

- Brent Butt as Brent Leroy
- Gabrielle Miller as Lacey Burrows
- Fred Ewanuick as Hank Yarbo
- Eric Peterson as Oscar Leroy
- Janet Wright as Emma Leroy
- Lorne Cardinal as Davis Quinton
- Tara Spencer-Nairn as Karen Pelly
- Nancy Robertson as Wanda Dollard
- Don Lake as Jerome, the film's antagonist
- Reagan Pasternak as Sasha, Jerome's associate
- Cavan Cunningham as Fitzy Fitzgerald, mayor of Dog River
- Karen Holness as Tina Fuller, a National Star reporter
- Jean Freeman as Fitzy's grandma
- Gwen Seed as Mertyl Runciman, a neighbour of Oscar and Emma Leroy
- Karen Robinson as Powerco Debbie
- Russell Yuen as Won Hu
- Michael Boisvert as Survivan Ivan

Graham Greene, Will Sasso, Jon Montgomery, and sportscasters Jay Onrait, Dan O'Toole, and Darren Dutchyshen make cameo appearances.

== Production ==
Shooting occurred in Rouleau, Saskatchewan from 22 June – 22 July 2014.

Approximately three-quarters of the $8.5 million budget was supported by government funding and credits. This included $2.5 million from Telefilm Canada, and approximately $2 million from Saskatchewan provincial sources ($1.5 million from Tourism Saskatchewan, $0.5 million from Creative Saskatchewan), plus $1.15 million in tax credits from the federal and Ontario provincial government. $285,840 was raised through individual donations during a Kickstarter campaign in May and June 2014, with $150,000 of this raised during the campaign's first two days. A number of individuals who donated to the Kickstarter campaign appear as Dog River residents in the film.

== Release ==
The film's first public screening was 25 November 2014 in Regina at Canada Saskatchewan Production Studios, followed by a gala in Ottawa on 1 December. The film was screened in cinemas in Canada for a limited run from 3—9 December 2014, later extended to 14 December due to public demand.

The film was then screened through Bell Media properties, beginning with CraveTV and The Movie Network, followed by its network television premiere on CTV and CTV Two on 17 December 2014. The film also aired on The Comedy Network.

== Reception ==
=== Ratings ===
The network premiere of the film garnered 1.84 million viewers.

=== Critical response ===
The film gained generally favourable reviews. A positive review came from Linda Barnard of Toronto Star who stated "In truth, the film feels like 96 minutes of the television series stitched together, but that makes the film feel more authentic, and will please most audiences." Another good review came from Jim Slotek of Jam! Movies, who stated, "It's about as funny and authentic a film you will get based on a TV show about nothing."

A negative review came from John Haggerty of The Globe and Mail who gave the film one-and-a-half stars out of four, stating, "You can practically hear the film groan as it goes past half-an-hour."
