= Kelly Rebar =

Canadian playwright and screenwriter (born 1956)

Kelly Rebar (born 1956 in Lethbridge, Alberta) is a Canadian playwright and screenwriter, best known for the play and film Bordertown Café.

Her first play, Chatters, was produced at Calgary's Factory Theatre West in 1974. She studied film at York University in Toronto, Ontario, graduating in 1978. Her second play, Checkin' Out, was produced by Northern Light Theatre in 1981, and Bordertown Café was first staged in 1987. Her other plays have included First Snowfall and Cornflower Blue.

For the theatrical version of Bordertown Café, she was shortlisted for the Dora Mavor Moore Award for Outstanding New Play in 1989, and won the Canadian Authors Association award for drama in 1990, and for the film version she was a shortlisted Genie Award nominee for Best Adapted Screenplay at the 13th Genie Awards in 1992. She subsequently concentrated on film and television writing, including the television series Wind at My Back and Jake and the Kid, and CBC Television's film adaptation of Alice Munro's Lives of Girls and Women.
