= Young Triffie =

- Directed by: Mary Walsh
- Written by: Ray Guy; Christian Murray; Mary Walsh
- Produced by: Daniel Louis; Denise Robert; Barbara Doran
- Starring: Fred Ewanuick; Rémy Girard; Andrea Martin; Colin Mochrie
- Cinematography: Éric Cayla
- Edited by: Yvann Thibaudeau
- Music by: Alan Doyle; Keith Power
- Production companies: Morag Loves Company; Cinémaginaire
- Distributed by: TVA Films
- Release dates: September 2006 (Atlantic Film Festival); 6 April 2007 (Canada)
- Running time: 89 minutes
- Country: Canada
- Language: English

Young Triffie is a Canadian dark comedy film, directed by Mary Walsh and released in 2006.

Set in 1947, before Newfoundland joined Confederation, the film is about a clumsy and unpopular Newfoundland Ranger Alan Hepditch (Fred Ewanuick), who is sent to investigate a case of sexually assaulted and mutilated sheep in fictional outport Swyer's Harbour. The cast also includes Andrea Martin, Jonny Harris, Colin Mochrie, Susan Kent, Andy Jones, Cathy Jones and Remy Girard.

The film was written by Ray Guy, based on his 1985 stage play Young Triffie's Been Made Away With. It was produced by Denise Robert and Daniel Louis.

It premiered at the 2006 Atlantic Film Festival, before going into commercial release in 2007.

Alan Doyle received a Genie Award nomination for Best Original Song at the 28th Genie Awards in 2008.
