= Bordertown Café =

- Directed by: Norma Bailey
- Written by: Kelly Rebar
- Based on: Bordertown Café by Kelly Rebar
- Produced by: Norma Bailey
- Starring: Janet Wright; Susan Hogan; Gordon Michael Woolvett
- Cinematography: Ian Elkin
- Edited by: Lara Mazur
- Music by: Ben Mink
- Production companies: Cinexus; Flat City Films
- Distributed by: C/FP Distribution
- Release date: 1992
- Running time: 101 minutes
- Country: Canada
- Language: English

Bordertown Café is a 1992 Canadian drama film produced and directed by Norma Bailey and written by Kelly Rebar, based on her 1987 play of the same name. The film stars Janet Wright and Susan Hogan. Set in Alberta, Bordertown Café was filmed outside of Warren, Manitoba.

Hogan plays Marlene, the divorced owner of a small café in a rural Alberta town near the Canada–United States border, whose life is turned upside down when her son Jimmy (Gordon Michael Woolvett) is offered the opportunity to go live with his father and his father's new wife in the States.

Wright plays Maxine, Marlene's mother and Jimmy's grandmother. She won the Genie Award for Best Performance by an Actress in a Leading Role at the 13th Genie Awards ceremony. Rebar was also nominated for Best Adapted Screenplay, and Lara Mazur was nominated for Best Editing.

== Cast ==
- Susan Hogan as Marlene
- Janet Wright as Maxine
- Lora Schroeder as Linda
- Victor Cowie as Chuck
- James Holland as Quint
- Rugard Drusche as Wally
- Ted Felbel as Carl
- Alec McClure as Nedchuk
- Margaret Anne MacLeod as Aunt Thelma
- Dorothy Montpetit as Mae
- Ruth De Graves as Dee
- Samantha Chemerika as Dee's Daughter
- Wil Parrott as Dee's Son
- Donna Lewis as Joy
- Pauline Broderick as Mrs. Nedchuck
- Martha Little as Barb
- Maureen Young-Howarth as Jill
- Kim Johnston as Tom
- Bobby Jones as Bran
- Nicholas Campbell as Don
- Sean McCann as Jim
- Ric Reid as Bob
- Gordon Michael Woolvett as Jimmy
