= Gabrielle Miller =

Canadian actress

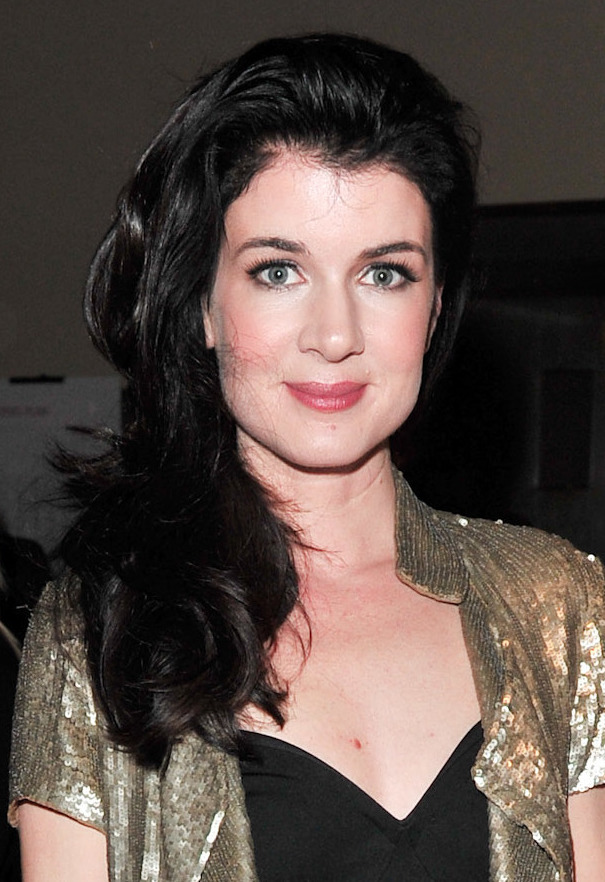
- Miller in 2012
- Born: Gabrielle Sunshine Miller; November 9, 1973 (age 52); Vancouver, British Columbia, Canada
- Years active: 1993 – present
- Awards: Best Ensemble Performance in a Comedy Program or Series; 2007 Corner Gas (shared) Leo Awards for Best Performance or Host in a Music, Comedy, or Variety Program or Series; 2005, 2006 Corner Gas; Leo Awards for Best Supporting Performance by a Female in a Dramatic Series; 2007 Robson Arms

Gabrielle Sunshine Miller (born November 9, 1973) is a Canadian actress who, since the start of her career in 1993, has appeared in many television films and series episodes, including leading roles in two of Canada's most popular concurrently-running series, the sitcom Corner Gas (2004–09) and the comedy-drama Robson Arms (2005–08). She was also a regular or semi-regular on the TV series Pasadena (2002), Alienated (2003–04), Call Me Fitz (2012–13), Mother Up! (2013) and Good Witch (2015–16). Most recently, she guest starred on a season 25 episode of Law & Order: Special Victims Unit.

== Career ==
She was a cast member of the Canadian television series Corner Gas, for which she won a shared Gemini Awards for Best Ensemble Performance in a Comedy Program or Series in 2007 and two Leo Awards for Best Performance or Host in a Music, Comedy, or Variety Program or Series (2005 and 2006).

She is also featured in the CTV series Robson Arms for which she won another Leo Award for Best Supporting Performance by a Female in a Dramatic Series in 2007. The limited-length seasons of both programs allowed her to appear in both series simultaneously.

Miller also had a recurring role on the television series Alienated during 2004, giving her the rare distinction of starring in three ongoing series during the same calendar year.

Miller's TV and film career dates back to 1993, and she has appeared in a variety of Canadian and American productions, including Highlander: The Series (where she played two different roles), The X-Files (where she played two different roles), Stargate SG-1, UC: Undercover, Outer Limits and Frasier. In 2002, she was a cast member on the short-lived American drama series Breaking News. She also made appearances on Sliders as Fling, and NCIS as Andrea Mavrey.

She is also a sponsor of World Vision Canada.

== Filmography ==
=== Film ===
Year	Title	Role	Notes
1993	Digger	Rosemary Malone	
1996	Starlight	Deborah	
1998	Rupert's Land	Shelley	
2000	The Silencer	Jill Martin	
2000	Marine Life	Joyce	
2002	Liebe auf den 2. Blick	Sarah	Video
2006	Love and Other Dilemmas	Ginger Shapiro	
2007	Holiday in Handcuffs	Jessica	
2011	Sisters & Brothers	Louise	
2012	Moving Day	Lina	
2013	Down River	Fawn	
2014	Corner Gas: The Movie	Lacey Burrows	
2016	The Adventure Club	Jane	

=== Television ===
Year	Title	Role	Notes
1993	Judgment Day: The John List Story	Patty List	Television film
1993	For the Love of My Child: The Anissa Ayala Story	Claudine	Television film
1993–94	Highlander: The Series	Bess / Michelle	Episodes: "Epitaph for Tommy", "Rite of Passage"
1994	Neon Rider	Nicole	Episode: "Where the Buffalo Roam"
1994	Moment of Truth: To Walk Again	Karen	Television film
1994	The Disappearance of Vonnie	Francine	Television film
1994	M.A.N.T.I.S.	Antonia Krieg	Episode: "The Black Dragon"
1995	Madison	Jennifer Steadman	Episode: "Bad Girls"
1995	The Other Mother: A Moment of Truth Movie	Sister Beatrice	Television film
1995	Sliders	Fling	Episode: "Summer of Love"
1995–96	The X-Files	Paula Gray / Brenda J. Summerfield	Episodes: "Our Town", "Syzygy"
1996	The Outer Limits	Charlotte Nichols	Episode: "From Within"
1997	The Sentinel	Kate Freeman	Episode: "Smart Alec"
1997	Breaking the Surface: The Greg Louganis Story	Despina	Television film
1997	Dead Man's Gun	Louise	Episode: "My Brother's Keeper"
1997	Stargate SG-1	Thetys	Episode: "Brief Candle"
1998	Viper	Wanda Stirnweis	Episode: "Paper Trail"
1998	Voyage of Terror	Paula Simon	Television film
1998	Poltergeist: The Legacy	Mary Miller	Episode: "The Covenant"
1998	Floating Away	Sugar	Television film
1998	In the Doghouse	Lauren Gibb	Television film
1998	Welcome to Paradox	Jane	Episode: "Alien Jane"
1998	The New Addams Family	Amanda Peterson	Episode: "New Neighbors Meet the Addams Family"
1999	Da Vinci's Inquest	Joanna	Episodes: "The Hunt", "The Capture"
1999	The Net	Julie "Diva" Davis	Episode: "Eye-see-you.com"
1999	First Wave	Molly Simon	Episode: "Susperience"
2000	The Inspectors 2: A Shred of Evidence	Betty Marsh	Television film
2000–01	The Outer Limits	Wendy Seymour / Megan	Episodes: "Glitch", "The Tipping Point"
2001	Anatomy of a Hate Crime	Kara Dupree	Television film
2001	The Immortal	Amente	Episode: "Forest for the Trees"
2001	The Chris Isaak Show	Officer Bonnie	Episode: "Fantasia"
2001	UC: Undercover	Vanessa	Episodes: "Life on the Wire", "Kiss Tomorrow Goodbye"
2002	Video Voyeur	Tisha Salomon	Television film
2002	Due East	Judi	Television film
2002	Jeremiah	Naomi	Episode: "The Touch"
2002	Pasadena	Emily	Recurring role
2002	Breaking News	Jacqui Savard	
2002	The Twilight Zone	Angela Perry	Episode: "To Protect and Serve"
2003	Jake 2.0	Jenny	Episode: "Last Man Standing"
2003–04	Alienated	Rebecca Myers	Recurring role
2004	Frasier	Willa Haver	Episode: "Coots and Ladders"
2004	The Collector	Alicia Keller	Episode: "The Roboticist"
2004–09	Corner Gas	Lacey Burrows	Main role
2005–08	Robson Arms	Bobbi Briggs	Main role
2007	Intelligence	Rayann Ribiso	Episode: "Dante's Inferno"
2007	Whistler	Alexis Grace	Episode: "End Game"
2007	Holiday in Handcuffs	Jessica Barber	Television film
2008	Shoot Me Now	Gabrielle	Episode: "Leo Awards: Parts 1 & 2"
2010	Cold Case	Barb Welter (1974)	Episode: "The Runaway Bunny"
2010	NCIS	Andrea Mavrey	Episode: "Jurisdiction"
2011	Trading Christmas	Faith Kerrigan	Television film
2012–13	Call Me Fitz	Melody Gray	Recurring role
2013	Lost Girl	Caroline	Episode: "Adventures in Fae-bysitting"
2013	Person of Interest	Dr. Julianna De Matteo	Episode: "In Extremis"
2013	Satisfaction	Denise	Episode: "First Contact"
2013	The Listener	Dr. Jillian Sisley	Episode: "Fatal Vision"
2013–14	Mother Up!	Sarah / Miss Belfonte (voice)	Main role
2014	Christmas at Cartwright's	Fiona Aldrich	Television film
2015	Haven	Lainey Fortuna	Episode: "Wild Card", "Perditus"
2015–16, 19	Good Witch	Linda Wallace	Recurring role
2016	Adventures in Babysitting	Donna Cooper	Television film
2018	Once Upon a Time	Mother Flora	Episode: "Flower Child"
2018–2021	Corner Gas Animated	Lacey Burrows	Main role
2019	Hailey Dean Mysteries	Ivy	Episode: "A Prescription for Murder"
2019	The Magicians	Carol	Episode: "Home Improvement"
2019	Pup Academy	Molly (voice)	2 Episodes
2023	Gwen Shamblin: Starving for Salvation	Emily	Television film
2024	Law & Order: Special Victims Unit	Denise Goldberg	Episode: "The Punch List"

== Awards and nominations ==
Awards
Year	Award	Category	Production	Result
1999	Gemini	Best Performance by an Actress in a Guest Role in a Dramatic Series	Da Vinci's Inquest	Nominated
2004	Gemini	Best Ensemble Performance in a Comedy Program or Series	Corner Gas ("Face Off")	Nominated
2004	Canadian Comedy Award	Television - Pretty Funny Performance - Female	Corner Gas	Nominated
2005	Leo	Dramatic Series: Best Guest Performance by a Female	Robson Arms ("The Tell-Tale Latex")	Nominated
2005	Leo	Music, Comedy, or Variety Program or Series: Best Performance or Host(s)	Corner Gas ("Face Off")	Won
2006	Leo	Best Performance or Host in a Music, Comedy or Variety Program or Series	Corner Gas ("The Brent Effect")	Won
2006	Gemini	Best Ensemble Performance in a Comedy Program or Series	Corner Gas ("Merry Gasmas")	Nominated
2007	Gemini	Best Ensemble Performance in a Comedy Program or Series	Corner Gas ("Gopher It")	Won
2007	Gemini	Best Performance by an Actress in a Continuing Leading Dramatic Role	Robson Arms ("Texas Birthmark")	Nominated
2007	Leo	Best Performance or Host(s) in a Music, Comedy or Variety Program or Series	Corner Gas ("Dress for Success")	Nominated
2007	Leo	Best Supporting Performance by a Female in a Dramatic Series	Robson Arms ("Texas Birthmark")	Won
2008	Leo	Best Performance or Host(s) in a Music, Comedy, or Variety Program or Series	Corner Gas ("Happy Campers")	Nominated
2009	Leo	Best Performance or Host(s) in a Music, Comedy or Variety Program or Series	Corner Gas ("Whiner Takes All")	Nominated
2013	Canadian Screen Award	Best Supporting Actress	Moving Day	Nominated
