= Paul Mather =

Canadian TV writer and producer

Paul Mather is a Canadian TV writer and producer. He is most known in Canada for his work on Corner Gas, Little Mosque on the Prairie and Rick Mercer Report. He also created or co-created the sitcoms Men with Brooms and Dan for Mayor.

In 2013, Mather was supervising producer on NBC's The Michael J. Fox Show.
