= Alienated (TV series) =

Canadian television series

- Genre: Situation comedy Science-fiction
- Directed by: Mark Sawers
- Starring: Sarah-Jane Redmond; Campbell Lane; Iris Graham; Andrew Robb; Jonathan Whittaker
- Composers: Earthmen; Don MacDonald
- Country of origin: Canada
- Original language: English
- No. of seasons: 2
- No. of episodes: 22

Production
- Executive producers: Stephen Hegyes; Shawn Williamson
- Producer: Cynthia Chapman
- Production location: Victoria, British Columbia
- Running time: 30 minutes (with commercials)

Original release
- Network: Space
- Release: July 8, 2003 – June 15, 2004

Alienated is a Canadian science fiction television series. It was set and filmed in Victoria, British Columbia. The series premiered July 8, 2003 on Space and lasted for two seasons.

Mill Creek Entertainment released the complete series on DVD.

== Synopsis ==
The plot centers around the Blundells, a typical suburban family living in Victoria who undergo strange (often sexual) changes after being abducted by space aliens (who remain unseen throughout the series).

== Characters ==
The show first aired in July 2003 and stars:

- Sarah-Jane Redmond as Sarah Blundell (Mother/wife)
- Campbell Lane as George Crickmore (Sarah's elderly father)
- Iris Graham as Isabelle Blundell (Daughter)
- Andrew Robb as Cameron Blundell (Fourteen-year-old Son)
- Jonathan Whittaker as Roger Blundell (Father/husband)

=== Guest stars ===
- George Takei as himself
- Michaela Mann as Charlie Delgado
- Gabrielle Miller as Rebecca Myers

== Episode listing ==
=== Season 1 ===
#	Title	Original release date
1	"Meatloaf Lunch"	July 8, 2003
2	"Officially Crazy"	July 15, 2003
3	"Pass the Saltpeter"	July 15, 2003
4	"Something has to be Something"	July 22, 2003
5	"Good Advice"	July 22, 2003
6	"Hard to Keep a Good Man Down"	July 29, 2003
7	"Nine One One"	July 29, 2003
8	"The Wet Spot"	August 5, 2003
9	"Foiled Again"	August 5, 2003
10	"Separation Anxiety"	August 12, 2003
11	"Unfit Parents"	August 12, 2003

=== Season 2 ===
#	Title	Original release date
1	"Paul's Motor Inn"	April 6, 2004
2	"Sexual People"	April 13, 2004
3	"The Weekly Inquisitor"	April 20, 2004
4	"Binge"	April 27, 2004
5	"Human Gas"	May 4, 2004
6	"Coming Out"	May 11, 2004
7	"The Arrival"	May 18, 2004
8	"Alien Man"	May 25, 2004
9	"Caught"	June 2, 2004
10	"Where's the Vagina?"	June 8, 2004
11	"Everything's Fine"	June 15, 2004
