= Janet Wright =

Canadian actress (1945–2016)

- Born: March 8, 1945; Farnborough, Hampshire, England
- Died: November 14, 2016 (aged 71); Vancouver, British Columbia, Canada
- Occupations: Actress; theatre director
- Years active: 1969–2014
- Known for: Corner Gas
- Spouses: Brian Richmond (div.); Bruce Davis
- Children: 3
- Relatives: Susan Wright (sister)

Janet Wright (March 8, 1945 – November 14, 2016) was an English-born Canadian actress and theatre director. She was best known for her role as Emma Leroy on the Canadian sitcom Corner Gas. She performed in many film and television shows, and she also acted in, and directed, dozens of theatre productions in Saskatoon, Vancouver, and at the Stratford Festival.

== Early life and education ==
Wright was born in Farnborough, Hampshire, England. Wright grew up as the eldest of four siblings (the others being Susan, John, and Anne) who have all participated in Canadian theatre.

== Career ==
Wright, along with her sister Susan, co-founded the Persephone Theatre company in Saskatoon in 1974. Wright's first husband, Brian Richmond, became the theatre's director. Wright later worked at the Vancouver Arts Club Theatre where she appeared in and directed more than 40 productions. She also appeared in several other productions in live theatre across Canada, and at the Stratford Festival in Ontario. Her theatre work eventually led to television and film roles in Canada and the United States.

In 1991, she performed at the Stratford Festival with her sisters Anne and Susan in Les Belles-soeurs, to positive reviews. In 1995, she was the first woman to play the title role in King Lear, for Canadian Stage in Toronto. Wright acted in the film Bordertown Café, for which she received a best actress Genie Award in 1992. In 2003 she was named best supporting actress in a dramatic program or miniseries at the Gemini Awards for her role in Betrayed.

From 2004 to 2009, she played Emma Leroy in the television series Corner Gas. In this role she won a 2006 Canadian Comedy Award for Pretty Funny TV Female. The show also won a Gemini Award in 2007. She reprised her role in 2014 for Corner Gas: The Movie.

Wright continued her involvement with the Vancouver Arts Club Theatre, directing several contemporary American plays, including Katori Hall's The Mountaintop and Ayad Akhtar's Disgraced in 2015. She continued acting from time to time at the Stratford Festival, lastly in 2011, when she played Ma Joad in The Grapes of Wrath.

== Family ==
Wright's sister Susan was killed in a fire in 1991 in Stratford, Ontario, along with their parents, Jack and Ruth (née Preston) Wright.

In January 2004, Wright's daughter Rachel Davis (aged 23) was fatally shot while intervening for a stranger who was being beaten in front of the Purple Onion bar in Vancouver, B.C. In July 2006, the shooter was convicted of two counts of first-degree murder, five counts of attempted murder and five counts of aggravated assault. His first degree murder conviction triggered an automatic sentence of life imprisonment with no chance of parole until 2029.

Wright and her second husband, Bruce Davis, along with the rest of their family, started the Rachel Davis Foundation. The foundation presents an award to a young person (aged 17–23) who has demonstrated an outstanding act of kindness or compassion.

== Death ==
Wright died on the morning of November 14, 2016, in Vancouver, aged 71, from undisclosed causes.

== Filmography ==
Film
Year	Title	Role	Notes
1969	Obscene House		
1971	McCabe & Mrs. Miller	Eunice	
1974	The Wolfpen Principle	Miss Mervin	
1978	The Wiz	The Wiz Singers	Voice, Uncredited
1982	Ladies and Gentlemen, The Fabulous Stains	Brenda	
1986	Loyalties	Audrey Sawchuk	
1987	American Gothic	Fanny	
1987	Home Is Where the Hart Is	J.P.'s Wife	
1988	Cowboys Don't Cry	Pearl	
1991	Bingo	Waitress	
1992	Bordertown Café	Maxine	
1999	The Boondock Saints	Annabelle MacManus	
2000	The Perfect Storm	Ethel Shatford	
2001	Chasing Cain	Sonia	
2001	Lola	Ma Keller	
2002	Blackwoods	Ma Franklin	
2002	Rollerball	Coach Olga	
2003	Emile	Alice	
2003	Arbor Vitae	Senior Nurse	Short film
2003	Thoughtcrimes	Zoya	TV movie
2006	Love and Other Dilemmas	Jojo Ladro	
2010	Ramona and Beezus	Grandma Kemp	
2012	The Tall Man	Trish	
2014	Corner Gas: The Movie	Emma Leroy	

Television
Year	Title	Role	Notes
1975	Peep Show	Lucy	Episode: "The Victim"
1978	Who'll Save Our Children?		Television film
1979	Huckleberry Finn and His Friends	Mrs. Judith Loftus	Episode: "The Rains Come"
1979	King of Kensington	Evelyn	Episode: "Big Brother"
1983	The Best Christmas Pageant Ever	Helen Armstrong	Television film
1984	The Three Wishes of Billy Grier	Woman in Bar	Television film
1985	Brotherly Love	Helen Neary	Television film
1986	The Girl Who Spelled Freedom	Woman Neighbor	Television film
1987	Deadly Deception	Desk clerk	Television film
1987	After the Promise	Waitress	Television film
1987	The Beachcombers	Didee	Episode: "Disposable People"
1987	Christmas Comes to Willow Creek	Martha Jane	Television film
1988	Laura Lansing Slept Here		Television film
1988-1989	Wiseguy	Millicent/Mabel	Episodes: "Revenge of the Mud People" and "All or Nothing"
1993-1994	Street Legal	Doris Banachowska/Jessica Grant	Episodes: "The Price"; Episode: "Strange Bedfellows," "The Long and Winding Road,"
1994	Neon Rider	Michelle Pfeiffer	Episode: "Where the Buffalo Roam"
1996	My Mother's Ghost		Television film
1996	Beyond the Call	Fran	Television film
1996	We the Jury	Gladys McKenzie	Television film
1997	Fast Track	Charlotte Scannel	Episode: "Triangle"
1998	Eerie, Indiana: The Other Dimension	Mrs. Floyd	Episode: "I'm Okay, You're Really Weird"
1998	Mr. Headmistress	Naomi Bascombe	Television film
1998	Due South	Sgt. Sam Thorn	Episode: "Mountie on the Bounty: Part 2"
1998-1999	Emily of New Moon	Aunt Thom	Episodes: "A Shadow in His Dream," "When the Bough Breaks," and "Bred in the Bone"
1999	More Tales of the City	Vita Keating	TV miniseries
1999	Redwall	Constance (voice)	36 episodes
1999	Lexx	Lorca	Episode: "Love Grows"
2000	Redwall: The Movie	Constance	Television film
2000	Mattimeo: A Tale of Redwall	Constance/Ghost of Martin (voice)	TV series
2001	Hostage Rescue Team	Simone	Television film
2001	Lexx	First Lady Priest	Episode: "Texx Lexx"; Episode: "Stan Down"
2001	Dark Angel	Annie	Episode: "Proof of Purchase"
2002	Framed		Television film
2002	The Chris Isaak Show	Evie	Episode: "Farm Boys"
2002	Monk	Bonnie	3 episodes
2002	Taken	Patty	Episode: "God's Equation"
2003	Betrayed	Dr. Fleming	Television film
2003	Jinnah: On Crime - White Knight, Black Widow	Frosty	Television film
2003	A Tale of Two Wives	Phyllis	Television film
2003	Phenomenon II	Jeri	Television film
2004	Kingdom Hospital	Liz Hinton	10 episodes
2004-2009	Corner Gas	Emma Leroy	107 episodes
2007	Whistler		Episode: "The Rules of Attachment: Part II"; Episode: "Last Run"
2008	Wisegal	Patty Montanari's Mother	Television film
2009	Memory Lanes	Sarah Duggen	Television film

== Awards and nominations ==
Janet Wright awards and nominations
Awards and nominations
Award	Wins	Nominations
Canadian Comedy Awards	1	3
Gemini Awards	2	4
Genie Awards	1	1

Totals (Note: Certain award groups do not simply award one winner. They acknowledge several different recipients, have runners-up, and have third place. Since this is a specific recognition and is different from losing an award, runner-up mentions are considered wins in this award tally. For simplification and to avoid errors, each award in this list has been presumed to have had a prior nomination.)
- Wins: 4
- Nominations: 8

Year	Nominated work	Event	Award	Result	Ref
1992	Bordertown Café	Genie Awards	Best Performance by an Actress in a Leading Role	Won	
2001	Chasing Cain	Gemini Awards	Best Performance by an Actress in a Featured Supporting Role in a Dramatic Program or Mini-Series	Nominated	
2003	Betrayed	Gemini Awards	Best Performance by an Actress in a Featured Supporting Role in a Dramatic Program or Mini-Series	Won	
2004	Corner Gas	Gemini Awards	Best Ensemble Performance in a Comedy Program or Series	Nominated	
2004	Corner Gas	Canadian Comedy Awards	Best Female TV Performance	Nominated	
2006	Corner Gas	Canadian Comedy Awards	Best Female TV Performance	Won	
2006	Corner Gas	Gemini Awards	Best Ensemble Performance in a Comedy Program or Series	Nominated	
2007	Corner Gas	Gemini Awards	Best Ensemble Performance in a Comedy Program or Series	Won	
2008	Corner Gas	Canadian Comedy Awards	Best Female TV Performance	Nominated	
