= Corner Gas =

Canadian television sitcom created by Brent Butt

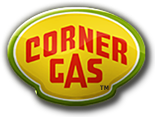
- Genre: Comedy
- Created by: Brent Butt
- Starring: Brent Butt; Gabrielle Miller; Fred Ewanuick; Eric Peterson; Janet Wright; Lorne Cardinal; Tara Spencer-Nairn; Nancy Robertson
- Music by: Rob & Todd Bryanton
- Opening theme: "Not a Lot Goin' On" by Craig Northey and Jesse Valenzuela
- Ending theme: "My Happy Place" by Odds
- Country of origin: Canada
- Original language: English
- No. of seasons: 6
- No. of episodes: 107 (list of episodes)

Production
- Executive producers: Brent Butt; David Storey; Virginia Thompson
- Running time: 21–23 minutes
- Production companies: 335 Productions; Vérité Films

Original release
- Network: CTV
- Release: January 22, 2004 – April 13, 2009

Related
- Corner Gas Animated

Corner Gas is a Canadian television sitcom created by Brent Butt. The series ran for six seasons from 2004 to 2009. Reruns still air on CTV, CTV2, CTV Comedy Channel, and Much, and are streaming on Crave, Amazon Prime, YouTube, and Peacock. The series was followed by a feature film titled Corner Gas: The Movie, with the entire cast reprising their roles. The film was released for a limited theatrical run in December 2014.

Deriving its name from the roadside gas station in the fictional town of Dog River, Saskatchewan, Corner Gas is the only gas station for 60 kilometres (37 mi) in any direction. Brent Leroy (Butt) is the proprietor of the station, which was formerly owned by his father, Oscar (Eric Peterson). Wanda Dollard (Nancy Robertson) works at the station's convenience store as a retail assistant. An adjoining coffee shop, The Ruby, is owned by Lacey Burrows (Gabrielle Miller), who inherited it from her Aunt Ruby.

The series completed its run following broadcast of its sixth season on April 13, 2009, with a total of 107 episodes. The show averaged one million viewers per episode. Corner Gas received six Gemini Awards, and was nominated almost 70 times for various awards.

On April 6, 2009, Saskatchewan premier Brad Wall signed a proclamation that declared April 13, 2009, "Corner Gas Day" in Saskatchewan.

Production of an animated adaptation, Corner Gas Animated, was announced in December 2016, and premiered on The Comedy Network on April 2, 2018, featuring the complete original cast voicing their original characters, save for Janet Wright, who died in November 2016, the month prior to announcement. The role of Emma is voiced in the animated version by Corrine Koslo.

== Production ==
=== Concept ===
The series was created by Canadian comedian Brent Butt, who imagined what his life might be like had he remained in a small Saskatchewan town rather than pursuing stand-up comedy. He originally developed the storyline for CTV and The Comedy Network.

Corner Gas references many tropes about Canadian identity, often ironically. The show focuses on the lifestyle of small-town folk; though set in a small town in Saskatchewan, its stories are not chiefly about Saskatchewan or Canada, but rather the day-to-day interactions of the residents of Dog River.

=== Executive producers, directors, and co-producers ===
Corner Gas was produced by CTV and Prairie Pants Productions. Prairie Pants Productions is a company assembled by Brent Butt, Virginia Thompson and 335 Productions. 335 Productions is a partnership between Brent Butt and David Storey. (The name of the production company is derived from the fact that Tisdale, Saskatchewan, Butt's hometown, lies at the junction of Saskatchewan Highways 3 and 35.) At The Comedy Network, Michelle Daly is Director of Content and Ed Robinson is the President and General Manager. At CTV Inc., Susanne Boyce is President, Creative, Content and Channels and again Ed Robinson is Executive Vice-president, Programming. Brent Butt was a driving force as creator, writer, show runner, executive producer, actor and, occasionally, director of the show. Paul Mather, Mark Farrell, Brent Butt, Andrew Carr, Kevin White, Robert Sheridan, Norm Hiscock, Dylan "Worts" Wertz and Gary Pearson all contributed to writing the series. David Storey, Mark Farrell, Robert de Lint, Jeff Beesley and Brent Butt provided direction in the program.

Corner Gas was promoted by CTV as the network's "first original narrative comedy series." While it is not, in fact, the first Canadian-produced sitcom ever aired on CTV, having been preceded by The Trouble with Tracy, George, Snow Job, Excuse My French, and Check It Out!, it is the first CTV sitcom in which the network itself has held a primary production role, rather than acting solely as a holder of broadcast rights, and the first to postdate the network's late-1990s corporate restructuring from a cooperative of its affiliated stations into a conventional corporation. Corner Gas can also be verifiably called the most successful of these shows.

=== Filming locations ===
Corner Gas was filmed entirely in Saskatchewan. The interior shots (Ruby Café interior, Police Department, Oscar and Emma's house, etc.) were filmed at Canada Saskatchewan Production Studios in Regina. All the outdoor scenes and all scenes that take place in the gas station were filmed on location in Rouleau, a small town on Highway 39 between Moose Jaw and Weyburn. The grain elevator was repainted to read "Dog River" instead of "Rouleau"; however, the water tower still reads "Rouleau" – with post production effects used to repaint it to read "Dog River" in the first-season episode "Grad 68". Regina is known as "the city" in Corner Gas.

On 28 September 2014, the building that was used as the FOO[D] MAR[KE]T, the local grocery store, was destroyed in a fire.

On 4 November 2016, the set that was used for both Corner Gas and the Ruby was demolished due to the foundations sinking. The structures, erected in 2003 as set pieces, were originally built on boggy land and were not initially built to last very long. In the intervening years, they had become a tourist attraction.

In summer 2021, the police station building partially collapsed, and the building was subsequently razed. On 5 November 2021, the grain elevator burned to the ground.

=== Opening sequence ===
The Corner Gas opening sequence follows a cold open. The opening theme music, "Not a Lot Goin' On", was written by Craig Northey of the rock band Odds and Jesse Valenzuela of the rock band Gin Blossoms, while the closing theme, "My Happy Place" was written by Northey and performed by Odds.

== Overview ==
Season	Episodes	Originally released	
Season	Episodes	First released	Last released
1	13	January 22, 2004	April 28, 2004
2	18	October 5, 2004	March 28, 2005
3	19	September 19, 2005	March 20, 2006
4	19	September 18, 2006	March 12, 2007
5	19	September 24, 2007	April 21, 2008
6	19	October 13, 2008	April 13, 2009
Film		November 25, 2014	

Corner Gas is the only gas station for 60 kilometres (37 mi) in any direction (according to the first two episodes of season one, "Ruby Reborn" and "Tax Man"). Brent Leroy (Brent Butt) is the proprietor of the station and Wanda Dollard (Nancy Robertson) works at the station's convenience store as a retail assistant. An adjoining diner, The Ruby, is owned by Lacey Burrows (Gabrielle Miller), who inherited it from her Aunt Ruby and moved to Dog River from Toronto. Brent's parents, Oscar Leroy (Eric Peterson) and Emma Leroy (Janet Wright), are lifetime residents of Dog River. Dog River's police force, consisting entirely of veteran Davis Quinton (Lorne Cardinal) and rookie Karen Pelly (Tara Spencer-Nairn), keep the peace in the small town—a very simple task—and the officers have an overabundance of free time. Finally, Brent's best friend Richard Henry "Hank" Yarbo (Fred Ewanuick), who is constantly unemployed, spends his time hanging out with Dog River's residents and drinking coffee, for which he rarely pays, at The Ruby.

The first episode of Corner Gas aired on January 22, 2004, and attracted 1.5 million viewers. The first season consisted of 13 episodes. Less than two months after the first episode aired, CTV renewed it for a second season of 18 episodes.

Butt's main co-writers were This Hour Has 22 Minutes writers Mark Farrell, Paul Mather, Kevin White, and Andrew Carr.

As broadcast of the fourth-season finale approached, there was a flurry of news reports suggesting that the series was coming to an unexpected end, based upon televised promotions for the episode, leaked plot details, and wording of a CTV press release issued on March 6, 2007, that implied that the series finale would air on March 12, 2007. Two segments of production footage with time code circulated on YouTube also seemed to indicate a series finale as imminent despite the show's continued success in Canada and recent U.S. sale. On March 7, 2007, CTV clarified its press release, stating it was a season finale, and on March 13, 2007, CTV confirmed an order for a 19-episode fifth season, which premiered on September 24, 2007.

On April 10, 2008, as production of the sixth season began, Butt announced via a press release that he and his production company, Prairie Pants, had decided to conclude production of the series after the sixth season, with the final episodes airing in the spring of 2009. Butt said the decision to end the series while still a popular offering on CTV was "a very difficult decision ... and one I felt I had to make. (CTV) made it clear that they were keen to do more seasons ... I wanted to exit gracefully, on top of our game."

The show's final episode aired on April 13, 2009, airing in simulcast on CTV, The Comedy Network, and A. The episode attracted 2,914,000 viewers on terrestrial television and an additional 235,000 on The Comedy Network, for a total viewership of 3,114,000.

== Characters ==
The surnames of all of the main characters and some recurring characters on the show (except for Mayor 'Fitzy' Fitzgerald) are names of small towns in Saskatchewan; Burrows, Dollard, Humboldt, Jansen (Jensen), Kinistino, Leroy, Pelly, Quinton, Runciman and Yarbo.

=== Main cast ===
- Brent Herbert Leroy (Brent Butt) is the sarcastic, comic book-reading proprietor of Corner Gas. He is good-natured, but has a tendency to fixate on minor details. It is implied that he and Lacey Burrows have feelings for each other, although neither acts upon them. In Corner Gas: The Movie he and Lacey have entered a romantic relationship three years after the events of the live-action series.
- Lacey Burrows (Gabrielle Miller) is originally from Toronto, and as the series begins she has just taken over the coffee shop in Dog River after her aunt's death and renamed it the Ruby in her honour. She is perpetually trying to fit into small-town life, with mixed, often disastrous, results.
- Richard Henry "Hank" Yarbo (Fred Ewanuick) is Brent's perpetually unemployed best friend, who is often paranoid and scheming. He often hangs out at Corner Gas talking to Brent and constantly borrows money from other characters, but rarely pays them back.
- Wanda Dollard (Nancy Robertson) is the cashier at Corner Gas, and the self-professed smartest person in town. She has a sardonic, caustic personality and enjoys lording her knowledge over others. She is the single mother of a six-year-old son, Tanner.
- Oscar Leroy (Eric Peterson) is Brent's grouchy, stubborn, elderly-stereotype father, the retired former owner and founder of Corner Gas. His all-purpose word is "jackass"; during the course of the live-action series, he says it ninety times (it is the series's final spoken word).
- Emma Leroy (Janet Wright) is Brent's mother, the brains and muscle of the family. She and Oscar squabble constantly and she usually ends up having to deal with the fallout from his actions, which she usually makes worse.
- Sergeant Davis Quinton (Lorne Cardinal) is Dog River's good-natured Cree senior police officer. He tends to be very sentimental, supportive, and interested in trying a variety of hobbies from pilates to ventriloquy. He has a habit of misspending the police budget, napping on the job, and making up the laws as he goes along, having never actually read the police manual. Due to the low crime rate in Dog River, he does not take his job very seriously.
- Constable Karen Pelly (Tara Spencer-Nairn) is Dog River's ambitious, athletic and sometimes neurotic junior police officer. She is the youngest main cast member in the series by about ten years.

=== Recurring characters ===
- Fitzy Fitzgerald (Cavan Cunningham) is the mayor of Dog River. He tends to take his position very seriously.
- Wes Humboldt (Mike O'Brien) owns and operates the liquor and insurance store in town.
- Paul Kinistino (Mark Dieter) is the Cree bartender at the Dog River Hotel. In season four, Paul is replaced by a new bartender, Phil Kinistino (Erroll Kinistino), though it is never revealed how they are related.
- Josh the Cook (Josh Strait) is the reserved chef at the Ruby.
- Helen Jensen (Jean Freeman), the mayor's grandmother, is also known as "Fitzy's Grandma".
- Myrtle Runciman (Gwen Seed) is a batty elderly neighbour of Oscar and Emma's who appears many times over the course of the show.

=== Notable guest stars ===
Several notable Canadian celebrities and politicians appeared as guest stars or in cameo roles on Corner Gas. Some celebrities made the trip to the Rouleau or Regina sets to film their appearances, others were filmed in the applicable locations (e.g., scenes involving cast members of Canadian Idol and Canada AM were filmed at the respective programs' studios).

Two successive sitting prime ministers, Paul Martin and Stephen Harper, made cameo appearances; Corner Gas is the only fictional sitcom (as opposed to sketch comedy series) in which sitting prime ministers have appeared. Two successive sitting premiers of Saskatchewan, Lorne Calvert and Brad Wall, also appeared in episodes. "Demolition" features former Governor General Adrienne Clarkson, taking a sledgehammer to an old barn. Ben Mulroney, host of TV shows Canadian Idol and eTalk Daily and the son of former Prime Minister Brian Mulroney, parodies himself during the third-season episode "Dog River Vice".

Kevin McDonald of The Kids in the Hall played Marvin Drey, a disliked Revenue Canada agent, in "Tax Man", the second episode of the series. In the same episode Dan Matheson, a news anchor for CTV, appeared as himself. Julie Stewart played a paint store clerk (parodying her role in Cold Squad) in "Grad 68". Comedian Mike Wilmot played Carl Vaughn, Brent's snobby cousin. Colin Mochrie, a prolific Canadian comedy actor best known for his work in the British and American versions of Whose Line Is It Anyway?, made a cameo appearance in the episode "Comedy Night" as part of a joke about how he seems to turn up on every Canadian TV show. Pamela Wallin, former CBC newscaster, later Canadian Consul General and senator, a native of Wadena, Saskatchewan, played herself. Canadian Idol judges Sass Jordan, Zack Werner, Jake Gold, and Farley Flex appeared as themselves rating Brent's rendition of "It would never rain in Dog River ... If I Could Squeegee the Sky" in the episode "Hook, Line and Sinker". TSN sportscaster (and U8TV: The Lofters alumnus) Jennifer Hedger and her SportsCentre colleague Darren Dutchyshen appeared as themselves in the episode "Face Off".

The second season also attracted notable personalities. "Wedding Card" featured hockey star Darryl Sittler as himself. Pat Fiacco, then-mayor of Regina, appears in the episode "Whataphobia" as Stan, the owner of Dog River's miniature golf course. "Poor Brent" has an appearance by long-time CTV National News anchor Lloyd Robertson, playing himself. Canadian and world champion curlers Randy Ferbey and Dave Nedohin (both of whom curl for Alberta) appear as themselves providing advice during the hotly contested Dog River curling championship, the Clavet Cup in episode "Hurry Hard". The episode "An American in Saskatchewan" features Mark McKinney, a veteran of both The Kids in the Hall and Saturday Night Live as Bill, an American who visits Dog River by accident. Saskatchewan-born musician Colin James appears as a local musician (although it is implied that he's actually playing himself) who performs an audition in Brent's garage. The rock group The Tragically Hip appear as "local kids" who practise in Brent's garage. The Tragically Hip play a rough version of "It Can't Be Nashville Every Night" off their In Between Evolution album. Both The Tragically Hip and Colin James are in the episode "Rock On!"

Singer Jann Arden appears as herself in "Fun Run". Noted actress Shirley Douglas (mother of Kiefer Sutherland, and daughter of Tommy Douglas, former Premier of Saskatchewan) plays a woman with the hots for Oscar in "Trees a Crowd". Then-federal finance minister Ralph Goodale appears as a Ruby Café customer in "Picture Perfect". (The episode debuted the same day Goodale filed a "mini-budget" in the House of Commons.) Lorne Calvert, premier of Saskatchewan, appears as himself. He appears three times: twice to poke fun at Sweden and once to almost get hit by a thrown newspaper during the appropriately named "Ruby Newsday". Vicki Gabereau appears as herself during a fantasy sequence in the same episode. Prior to the debut of Corner Gas, the cast had appeared on Gabereau's CTV talk show, during which Brent Butt promised to get the talk show host a guest appearance. "Merry Gasmas" features This Hour Has 22 Minutes anchor Gavin Crawford as a worker in the Calgary International Airport. He would always call cities their airport names (YYC, YEG) which confused Lacey horribly. In the same episode Dan Redican from The Frantics, and more recently Puppets Who Kill, makes an appearance as a worker in the Regina International Airport. He repeatedly says "made that call." Comedy Inc. star Roman Danylo makes a cameo as a passenger sitting next to Lacey on a plane from Alberta to Vancouver. He claims to be a "cat doctor," and not a veterinarian. He manages to out-chat Lacey while talking about cats during the same episode. Ken Read, also known as "The Crazy Canuck," is a champion alpine skier and member of the Canadian Olympic Committee. During episode "Physical Credit", Read receives a browbeating from Oscar (which first aired the day after closing ceremonies of the 2006 Winter Olympics).

Olympic long-track speed skater medal winner Cindy Klassen makes a cameo appearance in the fourth season episode "Dog River Dave". Mike Holmes, the star of Holmes on Homes, helps to fix Oscar's bathroom in the episode "Jail House"; Wanda claims to have dated the Holmes character. CTV CEO Ivan Fecan makes a cameo appearance during the episode "Blog River". "Gopher It" featured then Prime Minister Stephen Harper as himself, stating that regardless of whether Dog River plans to commemorate prairie dogs or gophers, he appreciates both. Canada AM co-anchors Seamus O'Regan and Beverly Thomson appear, playing themselves. Unlike most cameos, O'Regan and Thomson appear extensively in this episode to parody their on-screen image. CTV National News reporter Rosemary Thompson appears, playing herself in a scrum with the Prime Minister at the gas station.

During the fifth season three episodes bring in notable personalities. In "Coming Distractions", Duane "Dog" Chapman and Beth Smith from Dog the Bounty Hunter appear to arrest Brent during a fantasy sequence. In the episode "Bed and Brake Fast" hockey player Travis Moen makes a cameo appearance with the Stanley Cup. In "Final Countdown", actor Kiefer Sutherland makes a cameo appearance. In the same episode, Shirley Douglas' voice is heard.

Michael Bublé appears in the sixth-season episode "TV Free Dog River". He calls in (unseen at first) to Davis's jazz radio program, requesting a song from Michael Bublé. After Davis says that "Michael Bublé isn't jazz", the camera cuts to the actual singer, who says sadly that he is "a gifted vocalist who defies genres". In episode four of the sixth season, "Meat Wave", Canadian science broadcaster and environmental activist David Suzuki also appears in a cameo.

== Setting ==
=== Dog River ===
Principal shooting set, as of February 12, 2010

Dog River (Rouleau, Saskatchewan) has a population of "about 500" according to "Census Sensibility". According to the Corner Gas tagline, it is 40 kilometres (25 mi) from nowhere, but still within a relatively short drive to "The City", where characters are often shown going to shop or attend "support meetings", in the case of Davis and Lacey. The rival town of Wullerton is "just down the road". It is stated in the episode "Tax Man" that Corner Gas is the only gas station for 60 kilometres (37 mi) in any direction. Series creator Brent Butt has said the town lies somewhere between Regina and Saskatoon; these two cities are 257 kilometres (160 mi) apart, so this fact does not contradict anything said on the series. In fact, the term "the city" has been used at various times in the series to refer to Regina. The third-season episode, "Fun Run" has one character drive to Weyburn for a lark, suggesting Dog River is probably closer to Regina than it is to Saskatoon. In the episode "Outside Joke", when the Corner Gas station is believed to actually be outside the town limits, it is said to be in the fictional municipality of Pitt Creek. In "Kid Stuff", Wanda says it is south of the also fictional Crowley Lake.

The town's name is an homage to series creator Brent Butt's hometown of Tisdale, Saskatchewan, through which the Doghide River flows. However, in the show itself, the second-season episode "Rock On!" revealed that the town was named after a great-great uncle of Lacey's who drowned a dozen dogs in the river. She discovered this trivia while researching information for a history plaque. In order to play down this unsavoury branch of her family tree, Lacey instead used a story that Karen made up: that pioneers somehow got hold of a hot air balloon, got an aerial view of the town site, and noticed that the creek formed a shape similar to that of a dog's leg. "Block Party" revealed that the town was founded in 1905, and its founder was a Mr. Harold Main after whom Main Street was named (it was later renamed Centennial Street in 2005, the origin of the name being forgotten). Main also constructed Dog River's first building, a wooden shack which Hank Yarbo would burn down a century later in order to maintain the accuracy of his Lego scale model of the town (he ran out of blocks and could not make a replica of the shack).

A real-life Regina tour operator regularly takes busloads of tourists to Rouleau to visit "Dog River". Visitors can tour the on-location sets of Corner Gas, including the service station. Many components of Dog River are, in fact, real attributes of Rouleau, notably the combined liquor and insurance store.

On February 9, 2010, Google Street View extended its coverage of Canada, including all streets within Rouleau. The remnants of the Corner Gas and Ruby standing sets, along with the grain elevator labelled "Dog River" are visible from ground level at the junction of Highways 39 and 714. The grain elevator, built in 1972, was destroyed by fire on November 5, 2021.

After falling into disrepair when the show ended, the Rouleau sets were purchased by businessman Sylvain Senecal and restored as a souvenir shop. The sets were open from May 1 until late September where Corner Gas, Saskatchewan and regular convenience store items could be purchased, and were later once again utilized for Corner Gas: The Movie. However, by 2016, the Ruby and Corner Gas sets had once again fallen into disrepair and, due to being built on a bog, had begun to sink and were declared unsafe. On November 4, 2016, the buildings were demolished. Despite this, however, the town of Rouleau announced at the same time plans for a walking tour of surviving Corner Gas sets to launch in 2017, while the Western Development Museum branch in Moose Jaw announced plans to exhibit artifacts from the series, including the original Corner Gas sign.

=== The Howler ===
The town has its own newspaper, The Dog River Howler (usually just called "The Howler"), to which almost everybody has contributed at one point or another. Its headlines are usually rife with inaccurate, sensationalist reporting. An example of exaggeration can be seen in "Hero Sandwich," in which a proposal to install traffic lights at a four-way intersection prompts the headline "Crosswalk HELL—Mayor Insane." Another example occurs (mentioned in the same episode) when coyotes wander into town to eat cats, prompting the incorrectly spelled headline "Cattle Killed by Werewolfs [sic]." An example of amusingly fabricated reporting can be seen in the first episode, in which a headline reads "Moose Jaw Gets NBA Franchise," and at an unseen time, they declared that Canada was apparently at war with Switzerland. The paper is also rife with misspellings, for example in the third season that "Hank is PHYCIC [sic]" (the story was "contunied [sic]" on page 30) or in the fourth season that "Cop nabs barely [sic] thief" (after Karen mentions that the arraigned person was "barely a thief" for having stolen a truck loaded with barley).

=== Emergency services ===
The "Police Department," consisting of officers Davis and Karen, keeps the peace in Dog River.

In "The Littlest Yarbo," a short-lived Fire Department consisting of two firefighters, David and Carol (both showing remarkable similarities to Davis and Karen, respectively), was established by the mayor when the volunteer fire chief decided to sleep in as opposed to responding to a fire. The volunteer system was reestablished after Hank, Davis, and Oscar lit an uncontrollable leaf fire and the fire department did not respond as they were chasing a stray dog (the same one Hank thought to be "The Littlest Hobo"). Fitzy saw Davis in the aftermath as the only first responder there and gave him the new title of Chief, Volunteer Fire Department.

The Dog River Police Department owns two police cars, both 1994 Ford Crown Victorias. In every episode since the series premiere "Ruby Reborn" and "Dark Circles," the police use only one of them.

=== Wullerton rivalry ===
The residents of Dog River have a pathological dislike of the residents of Wullerton, a neighbouring town, to the point that they spit on the ground whenever the rival town is mentioned, much to Lacey's hygienic disapproval when such action takes place within her cafe. They are so used to doing so that they sometimes do not realize it when they spit (especially within said cafe). Dog River's local newspaper, the Howler, will even print "(SPIT)" after printing the word "Wullerton." However, the people of Wullerton may not hate Dog River, as seen in the fourth season's finale. (However, this was only part of Hank's fantasy sequence, and may not accurately reflect Wullerton's actual sentiment towards Dog River). The reason for this antipathy was never explained. Publicity for the second season indicated that the season finale would reveal the reason for the spitting; however, the episode as broadcast did not actually do so. This practice of looking down on neighbouring towns is common in many prairie communities, primarily those in Saskatchewan and Alberta, such as Tisdale, Melfort, and Wilcox. Wullerton is first shown onscreen in Corner Gas: The Movie, as for the reason Dog River residents hate it so much: Wullerton is a creepy, eerily Stepford Wives-ish town where everyone is excessively nice and clean-cut, which tends to scare any visitors from Dog River.

=== Thunderface ===
Thunderface is a band formed in the mid-1980s by lead singer Hank Yarbo, lead guitar player Brent Leroy, and bass guitar player Wanda Dollard. In a 2005 episode, the band expands to include drummer Karen Pelly, the most competent musician in the group.

Thunderface has suffered from relative anonymity due to confusion with their name, as well as the fact that they have had only one gig since 1986. They have been referred to as "Rumblepuss," "Thunderbread," "Thunderchunks," and "Wonderface," among other names. Their sound is described as similar to "a small animal caught in some kind of machinery," and their sole gig since 1986 was booked due to the humorous nature of their poor performance. Along with their gig in 1986, they seemed to have done some school performances considering they blew the principal's eyebrows off. The only song they have been heard to play is "Capital Cash" by Fast Exit, a band that Brent Butt played guitar in before he got into comedy.

=== The Surveillance Bush ===
The Surveillance Bush (the only foliage on the otherwise tree-less prairie surrounding the town) is a bush that is seen only in the first episode and the last episode. Karen is seen parked behind it watching for speeders in the Police Cruiser in Ruby Reborn. Davis and Karen are also seen on the last episode hiding behind it before tailing Brent in the final episode. Since there was no wind a cast member was actually lying down shaking the bush. The bush was planted only for those two episodes.

== Broadcast and distribution ==
=== First-run broadcast ===
In 2006, Corner Gas was the only Canadian-made top-20 TV show in all of Canada (other than a hockey telecast), the rest being U.S. imports. It first premiered in January 2004, outperforming all U.S. sitcoms among adults aged 25–54.

Since 2004, the series' production coincided with that of another CTV program, Robson Arms in which Gabrielle Miller and Fred Ewanuick also co-starred. Miller also had a recurring role in the series Alienated in 2004, giving her the rare distinction of playing major roles in three unrelated television series during the same calendar year (although Robson Arms had never been aired until 2005). As of fall 2007, two seasons of Robson Arms featuring Miller and Ewanuick have been produced and released to DVD.

Early in the run of Corner Gas, Toronto Sun television critic Bill Brioux reported an unconfirmed rumour that it had been unsuccessfully pitched to CBC Television, which came to be cited as evidence that the public broadcaster was out of touch with Canadian audiences. This was later revealed to be untrue; The Comedy Network was in fact the first and only network to which the show was proposed.

Fred Ewanuick appeared as Hank on the Royal Canadian Air Farce's 300th episode in a spoof of Corner Gas, in which Yasir (Carlo Rota) and Sarah (Sheila McCarthy) from CBC's Little Mosque on the Prairie bought the gas station and fired Brent. Hank then debated with them the location of Mercy (the Saskatchewan town where Little Mosque takes place) in relation to Dog River.

=== Live episode ===
In summer 2006, the cast of Corner Gas presented a fund-raising benefit event for Regina's Globe Theatre called Corner Gas...Live, in which the cast presented a live episode of the TV series. The popularity of the sitcom caused such a rush for tickets that the Globe Theatre's online ticket sales system briefly went down as a result. Another benefit was held during the summer of 2007.

=== U.S. broadcast ===
On November 24, 2006, it was announced that Corner Gas would air on the U.S. WGN America beginning September 17, 2007. Corner Gas was syndicated to WGN America by Multi-Platform Distribution Company (MPDC), which acquired the U.S. distribution rights for broadcast stations and cable channels. The show was offered to cable networks such as WGN America on an all-cash basis; the show was also offered to local stations on cash-plus-barter basis, though it was unknown if any channels other than WGN America carried the series. The series was carried by WGN America during the 2008–2009 television season; it was not broadcast in Chicago on WGN-TV.

In an unusual case, WGN America picked up the fifth season's episodes while they were airing contemporaneously on the show's original network CTV. In most cases, new episodes normally take a year or more to air in another country.

On October 3, 2019, Amazon-owned IMDb announced that it would be exclusively streaming the entire Corner Gas franchise on their platform for free to US viewers beginning on October 15.

=== DVD releases ===
The first season was released on DVD in Canada on October 19, 2004. In keeping with the theme of the series, each DVD set included a coupon good for a free coffee at Petro-Canada service stations. At the Canadian Entertainment Network Awards, Season one DVD was honoured as "Best Canadian DVD-English". The second season was released on DVD on September 27, 2005, and features the distinction of being one of the few regular TV series whose DVD box set includes described video for the visually impaired. The second-season set was released by CTV and Video Service Corporation and includes a peek at Season 3, bloopers, cast and crew interviews, a Thunderface music video as well as all of the season 2 episodes. The third-season DVD was released on October 3, 2006. Unlike the past sets, the third-season DVD set is presented in widescreen (letterboxed on 4:3 televisions, Windowboxed on widescreen TVs). The fourth season was released on DVD on September 18, 2007. From the fourth season forward, the episodes are presented in proper anamorphic widescreen. This was the first time the DVD set of the past season was released before the current season started airing; the set includes a series of "Mobisodes" which were short (approximately two minutes each) skits focusing on the main characters. Season 5 was released on DVD on October 7, 2008, and is presented in a "bobblehead" theme. Besides all of the 19 season 5 episodes, the set includes Corner Gas character commentaries, "My Happy Place" in a music video format and bloopers. Season 5 DVD set has enclosed a $10 discount coupon towards a Corner Gas mechanic shirt. Season 6 was released on June 9, 2009, two months after the series finale.

In Australia, only the first three series have been released. The cover art for the seasons differ from the Region 1 releases. The first two seasons having the group of the cast in front of the gas station which is in the distant background, while the third season has them in front of the grain silo. Unlike the Canadian release, the Australian version of Season 3 contains anamorphic widescreen versions of the episodes. Curiously, though, almost all of these episodes have never add any on-screen actor credits nor captions (such as the show's writers/directors) over any of the live action, suggesting that perhaps the DVD company had to go back to the original film elements in order to get an anamorphic picture.

- Corner Gas – Series 1 (2 Disc Set) – April 13, 2007
- Corner Gas – Series 2 (3 Disc Set) – July 14, 2009
- Corner Gas – Series 3 (3 Disc Set) – July 14, 2010

== Complementary media ==
=== Comedy tour ===
Brent Butt offered the eight-city "Gassed Up" tour beginning March 21, 2004. The $70,000 "Great Canadian Gas Giveaway Tour" began September 27, 2004. In late September 2004, to promote the start of the second season, the cast members of Corner Gas travelled to cities across Canada where they pumped gas at local service stations for the day (the fuel being provided to motorists free of charge). By the halfway point of the promotion, more than 40,000 litres of free gasoline had been pumped. The cast of Corner Gas crossed Canada visiting six cities in a comedy tour called CTV Presents Corner Gas Live! which began September 21, 2005. Eight Canadian radio stations broadcast the show live at the start of the fourth season.

=== Comic Genius ===
In 2005, Corner Gas partnered with The Comedy Network to host a contest called Comic Genius. The majority of episodes were broadcast online, with the one-hour finale broadcast live on The Comedy Network in February 2006. The winner, John Beuhler, won $10,000 and a guest appearance on the show.

=== Corner Gas Online ===
"Corner Gas Online" provides cast biographies, episode synopsis, bloopers, and a visit to Virtual Dog River. The Virtual Dog River features The Howler providing the latest news about the television series. There are online games available such as prairie scramble, combine racing and the perfect pump when visiting various locations in virtual Dog River. Oscar and Emma Leroy's virtual home features Corner Gas bloopers. Visiting the Ruby will provide an online chat room. The virtual gas station is an online shop for licensed merchandise. Corner Gas episodes can now be watched on demand on The CTV Video Player at CTV.ca and thecomedynetwork.ca.

=== Licensed merchandise ===
Corner Gas has spawned a merchandising business, with hundreds of retail items, sold-out live touring productions, and best-selling DVDs. A companion book to the show, called Tales from Dog River: The Complete Corner Gas Guide, was published on November 4, 2006. It was written by Toronto journalist Michele Sponagle and was produced in conjunction with CTV, Penguin Canada, and Prairie Pants Productions. The book debuted in the number two spot among new releases, behind only Vincent Lam's Giller Prize-winning book Bloodletting and Miraculous Cures. On December 12, 2006, it was the top-selling non-fiction paperback in Canada, according to BookMarket data. It includes cast interviews, an episode guide, insider jokes, bloopers, best lines, a look at the real Dog River (Rouleau, Saskatchewan), and a chronology on how the show was created from inception to debut episode. Author Michele Sponagle went on a book tour to cities across Canada, including Ottawa, Halifax, Toronto, Edmonton and Vancouver to promote the book, alongside various cast members. A follow-up to the book called Dog River Confidential: The Super, Even More Complete Corner Gas Guide, also by author Michele Sponagle, was released by Penguin Canada on November 10, 2009.

=== Corner Gas: The Movie ===
Corner Gas: The Movie premiered on December 3, 2014, for a limited five-day release in select Canadian theatres. All of the major cast members returned for the film. A Kickstarter campaign for Corner Gas: The Movie was successfully funded on June 19, 2014. TSN's Jay Onrait and Dan O'Toole are in the film (formerly of Fox Sports 1), as well as TSN anchor Darren Dutchyshen and Olympic Gold Medalist Jon Montgomery.

The movie made its broadcast premiere on CTV on December 17, 2014, and has been released on both Blu-ray and DVD.

=== Animated series ===
A 13-episode animated series, titled Corner Gas Animated was announced on December 19, 2016. The series features the voices of many original cast members (Corrine Koslo provided the voice of Emma Leroy, replacing the late Janet Wright). It debuted in April 2018. In October 2019, it was announced that it was renewed for a third season to air on CTV Comedy Channel in 2020. In October 2019, after a third season renewal, during the second season broadcast, it was announced that Amazon's IMDb TV (now Amazon Freevee), starting October 20. The fourth and final season premiered in July 2021 on CTV. Freevee announced in April 2022, as part of their re-brand from IMDb TV to Freevee, that the final season would release on June 20, 2022.

== Impact ==
In 2006, Corner Gas aired in 26 countries. Free land was awarded through the Corner Gas website which enabled a Quebec couple to move to Climax. In Rouleau, a local resident started a "Ruby" café.

=== Awards ===
Corner Gas has won a variety of awards since it debuted as a series January 2004 including nine Canadian Comedy Awards and six Gemini Awards. The Canadian Comedy Awards include Best Direction (TV Series)—2004–2006, Best Male Performance (TV)—2004 and 2005 (Brent Butt), 2007 (Eric Peterson), Best Female Performance (TV)—2006 (Janet Wright) and Best Writing (TV Series)—2004 and 2007.

The six Gemini Awards include Best Comedy Program or Series—2005, 2006, and 2007; Best Ensemble Performance in a Comedy Program or Series—for the episode "Gopher It", 2007; Best Writing in a Comedy or Variety Program or Series—Mark Ferrell for the episode "Gopher It", 2007; and Best Interactive—2005. 2007 was the third consecutive year that Corner Gas won the best comedy award.

The show also has eight other Gemini Award nominations. It was nominated for an International Emmy Award in 2004.

In 2004, the show was honoured with the DGC Award win for Outstanding Team Achievement in a TV Series—Comedy. They were also nominated in 2005. Corner Gas received the WGC Award win in 2005 for Best Comedy & Variety Program. Corner Gas also lays claim to seven Leo Award wins.

Corner Gas received two awards at the 7th Canadian Comedy Awards. The awards were given for best direction and to Janet Wright achieved the award for top female performer. Corner Gas writers received an award for the episode "Comedy Night" at the 9th annual Canadian Screenwriting Awards on April 18, 2005. Writers Mark Farrell and Robert Sheridan received the 2008 Canadian Screenwriting Award for best half-hour drama series on April 14, 2008.
