= 21st Gemini Awards =

2006 awards for Canadian television

- Date: November 4, 2006
- Venue: River Rock Casino Resort, Richmond, BC

Television/radio coverage
- Network: Global Television Network

The Academy of Canadian Cinema & Television's 21st Gemini Awards were held on November 4, 2006, to honour achievements in Canadian television. The awards show, which was co-hosted by several celebrities, took place at the River Rock Casino Resort in Richmond, British Columbia and was broadcast on Global.

== Awards ==
=== Best Dramatic Series ===
- Slings & Arrows – Rhombus Media. Producers: Sari Friedland, Niv Fichman, Daniel Iron
- ReGenesis – The Movie Network, Movie Central, Shaftesbury Films. Producers: Christina Jennings, Tom Chehak, Scott Garvie, Laurie Mclarty, Shane Kinnear, Jamie Paul Rock, Avrum Jacobson
- This Is Wonderland – Muse Entertainment, Indian Grove Productions. Producers: Bernard Zukerman, Michael Prupas, Dani Romain, George F. Walker, Thom J. Pretak
- Moccasin Flats – Stephen Onda Productions, Big Soul Productions. Producers: Laura Milliken, Jennifer Podemski
- Terminal City – Crescent Entertainment, Big Dog Productions. Producers: Jayme Pfahl, Angus Fraser, Gordon Mark

=== Best Dramatic Mini-Series ===
- Human Trafficking – Muse Entertainment. Producers: Michael Prupas, Christian Duguay, Irene Litinsky
- Prairie Giant: The Tommy Douglas Story – Canadian Broadcasting Corporation. Producer: Kevin DeWalt
- Trudeau II: Maverick in the Making – Big Motion Pictures. Producers: Wayne Grigsby, David MacLeod

=== Best TV Movie ===
- Hunt for Justice: The Louise Arbour Story – Galafilm, TATfilm. Producers: Arnie Gelbart, Francine Allaire, Randy Holleschau, Anne Marie La Traverse, Christine Ruppert
- Heyday! – Pope Productions, Triptych Media. Producers: Anna Stratton, Robin Cass, Paul Pope
- Intelligence: The Movie – Haddock Entertainment. Producers: Chris Haddock, Carwyn Jones, Laura Lightbown, Arvi Liimatainen, Stephen Surjik
- One Dead Indian – Sienna Films. Producers: Brent Barclay, Jennifer Kawaja, Julia Sereny, Kevin Tierney
- Terry – Shaftesbury Films. Producers: Christina Jennings, Shawn Ashmore, Scott Garvie, Laurie Mclarty, Shane Kinnear, Julie Lacey, Gail Harvey, Patrick Cassavetti, Paul Nicholls

=== Best Comedy Program or Series ===
- Corner Gas – CTV Television Network, Prairie Pants Productions. Producers: Brent Butt, Mark Farrell, David Storey, Virginia Thompson, Paul Mather
- History Bites – Mother Britain – The History Channel. Producers: Rick Green, David C. Smith
- Kenny vs. Spenny – Canadian Broadcasting Corporation, Cinefornia, Blueprint Entertainment, Eggplant Picture & Sound, KVS Productions. Producers: Abby Finer, Christine Shipton, Kenny Hotz, Ira Levy, John Morayniss, Spencer Rice, Kirsten Scollie, Peter Williamson
- Naked Josh – Sextant Productions, Cirrus Communications. Producers: Richard Speer, Josée Vallée, Jacques Blain, André Béraud
- Jeff Ltd. – CTV Television Network, S&S Productions, Dufferin Gate Productions, Seymour & From Productions 2, The Comedy Network. Producer: Jeff Seymour
- Rick Mercer Report – CBC Television, Island Edge. Producers: Gerald Lunz, Rick Mercer

=== Best Music, Variety Program or Series ===
- Juno Songwriters’ Circle – Canadian Academy of Recording Arts and Sciences, Canadian Broadcasting Corporation. Producers: Moya Walsh, Brookes Diamond, Geoff D'Eon
- The TO Variety Show – Insight Productions. Producers: John Brunton, Elizabeth Allan, Barbara Bowlby, Adrian Callender
- Words to Music: The Canadian Songwriters Hall of Fame 2006 – Cansong Productions. Producers: Peter Steinmetz, David Kitching, Jody Scotchmer
- Live at the Rehearsal Hall – Bravo!. Producers: Robert Benson, John Gunn
- Alberta Bound: A Centennial Celebration – Canadian Broadcasting Corporation. Producers: Jack Stuart, Jean Merriman, Lance Mueller

=== Best Performing Arts Program or Series, or Arts Documentary Program or Series ===
- Prisoners of Age – The Eyes Project Development Corp. Producer: Stan Feingold
- A Long Journey Home – Greenspace Production. Producers: Gail McIntyre, Amélie Blanchard
- Comedy Gold: The Hilarious Story of Canadian Comedy – Insight Productions. Producers: Barbara Bowlby, Martha Kehoe, John Brunton
- Freedom – Freedom II – Sound Venture International. Producers: Bob Barrett, Ric Randmaa, Neil Bregman
- Perreault Dancer (Danser Perreault) – Les Films de l'Isle. Producer: Ian Boyd

=== Best Talk Series ===
- George Stroumboulopoulos Tonight – Canadian Broadcasting Corporation. Producers: Jennifer Dettman, Susan Taylor, David Freeman
- Au Courant – Canadian Broadcasting Corporation. Producers: Luise Massari, Claire Cappelletti, Anna Dirksen
- Hot Type – CBC Newsworld. Producers: Dana Glassman, Alice Hopton, Janet Thomson

=== Best Reality Program or Series ===
- Much Music VJ Search: The Series – Insight Productions. Producers: John Brunton, Barbara Bowlby, Andrea Gabourie
- Venture – The Big Switcheroo: Boston Pizza – Canadian Broadcasting Corporation. Producers: Tracy Tighe, Dianne Buckner
- The Next Great Chef – Next Entertainment. Producers: Edi Osghian, Andy Levine, Nick Versteeg
- Bomber Boys: The Fighting Lancaster – Frantic Films. Producer: Jamie Brown
- From the Ground Up with Debbie Travis – Whalley-Abbey Media. Producers: Debbie Travis, Kit Redmond, Hans Rosenstein

=== Best General/Human Interest Series ===
- Stuntdawgs – Lucky Bastard Films, Omnifilm Entertainment. Producers: Gabriela Schonbach, David Gullason
- Canada's Worst Driver – Proper Television. Producer: Guy O'Sullivan
- CBC News: Sunday – Canadian Broadcasting Corporation. Producers: Richard O’Regan, Peter Walsh, Greg Sadler, Roger Beattie, Michael Kearns, Patsy Pehleman
- Entertainment Tonight Canada – Corus Entertainment, CBS Media Ventures. Producers: Zev Shalev, Fiorella Grossi
- Forensic Factor – Exploration Production. Producer: Edwina Follows
- Saturday Night at the Movies – The Interviews – TVOntario. Producers: Rudy Buttignol, Thom Ernst, Murray Battle

=== Donald Brittain Award for Best Social/Political Documentary Program ===
- House Calls – National Film Board of Canada. Producers: Silva Basmajian, Gerry Flahive
- Big Sugar – Galafilm. Producers: Arnie Gelbart, Sylvia Wilson, Stephen Phizicky
- CBC News: Sunday – Beyond Words: Photographers of War – Canadian Broadcasting Corporation. Producers: Greg Kelly, Stuart Coxe, Eric Foss
- Memory for Max, Claire, Ida and Company – TVOntario. Producers: Rudy Buttignol, Kathy Avrich-Johnson, Allan King
- POV – No More Tears Sister – National Film Board of Canada. Producers: Pierre Lapointe, Sally Bochner

=== Best Documentary Series ===
- China Rises – Canadian Broadcasting Corporation, New York Times Television. Producers: Susan Dando, Mark Starowicz, Kelly Crichton
- The Nature of Things – Canadian Broadcasting Corporation. Producer: Michael Allder
- The Passionate Eye – Canadian Broadcast Corporation. Producers: Catherine Olsen, Charlotte Odele, Diane Rotteau, Angelina Stokman
- The View from Here – TVOntario). Producer: Rudy Buttignol
- Turning Points of History – Barna-Alper Productions, Connections Productions. Producers: Laszlo Barna, Alan Mendelsohn

=== Best History Documentary Program ===
- Breaking Point – CBC Television. Producer: Jacqueline Corkery
- The Bomb – Barna-Alper Productions. Producers: Alan Mendelsohn, Laszlo Barna
- The Secret Mulroney Tapes – Canadian Broadcasting Corporation. Producers: Gordon Henderson, Mike Sheerin
- Icebound: The Final Voyage of the Karluk – Kaizen West Productions. Producers: Deb Proc, David Gullason
- Last Flight To Berlin – Nightfighters Productions. Producer: Robert Linnell
- Letters from Karelia – National Film Board of Canada. Producers: Joseph MacDonald, Graydon McCrea

=== Best Biography Documentary Program ===
- Braindamadj'd...Take II – Apartment 11 Productions. Producers: Jonathan Finkelstein, Allan Joli-Coeur
- Generations: A Century on the Siksika Reserve – Canadian Broadcasting Corporation. Producers: Noah Erenberg, Renée Pellerin
- Ken Leishman: The Flying Bandit – Flying Bandit Productions. Producer: Jamie Brown
- The Fires That Burn: The Life and Work of Sister Elaine MacInnes – May Street Productions. Producers: Hilary Pryor, Garfield Miller
- The Velvet Revolution – Barna-Alper Productions. Producers: Alan Mendelsohn, Laszlo Barna

=== Best Science, Technology, Nature, Environment or Adventure Documentary Program ===
- Being Caribou – National Film Board of Canada. Producers: Tracey Friesen, Rina Fraticelli
- the fifth estate – Black Dawn – Canadian Broadcasting Corporation. Producers: David Studer, Jane Mingay, Jim Williamson, Douglas Arrowsmith
- The Nature of Things – Nature Bites Back: The Case of The Sea Otter – Canadian Broadcasting Corporation. Producer: Christopher Sumpton
- Lifelike – Producer: Nathalia Barton
- How William Shatner Changed the World – Mentorn Media, Handel Productions. Producers: Alan Handel, Malcolm Clarke

=== Best News Information Series ===
- the fifth estate – Canadian Broadcasting Corporation. Producers: David Studer, Jane Mingay, Sally Reardon, Jim Williamson
- Marketplace – Canadian Broadcasting Corporation. Producers: Sheilagh D'Arcy McGee, Tassie Notar
- 360° Vision – VisionTV. Producers: John Scully, Sadia Zaman

=== Best News Magazine Segment ===
- The National/CBC News – Suzanne – Canadian Broadcasting Corporation. Producers: Catherine McIsaac, Eric Foss, Alex Shprintsen, Paul Kennedy
- CBC News: Halifax at 6:00 – Sri Lanka Diary – Canadian Broadcasting Corporation. Producers: Rohan Fernando, Eric Woolliscroft, Geoff D'Eon
- Canada Now: Pacific Edition – David's Story – Canadian Broadcasting Corporation. Producers: James Roberts, Michael Taylor-Noonan, Jim Hoffman, Duncan McCue
- CBC News: Sunday Night – Mission House – Canadian Broadcasting Corporation. Producer: Peter Wall
- CBC News: Sunday Night – Crack – Canadian Broadcasting Corporation. Producer: Bruce Livesey

=== Best Newscast ===
- The National/CBC News – Strange Destiny – Canadian Broadcasting Corporation. Producers: Jonathan Whitten, Mark Harrison, Fred Parker, Greg Reaume
- CityNews: CityNews at Six – Citytv. Producers: Stephen Hurlbut, Derek Miller, Tina Cortese, Katia Del Col
- Global National – Global National with Kevin Newman – Global News. Producers: Kenton Boston, Doriana Temolo, Kathleen O' Keefe

=== Best News Special Event Coverage ===
- CBC News: 60th Anniversary of V-E Day – Canadian Broadcasting Corporation. Producers: Mark Bulgutch, Fred Parker, Tom Dinsmore
- CBC News: Canada Votes – Canadian Broadcasting Corporation. Producers: Mark Bulgutch, Fred Parker, David Mathews
- CBC News: Crash at Pearson: Air France Flight 358/Pearson International Airport – Canadian Broadcasting Corporation. Producers: Bob Weiers, Angela Naus
- Global National – Canadian Federal Election 2006 – Global Television Network. Producers: Rae-anne Morin, Randy McHale, Ian Haysom
- Global National – Government Falls – Global Television Network. Producers: Doriana Temolo, Kenton Boston, Kevin Newman

=== Best Lifestyle/Practical Information Series ===
- Til Debt Do Us Part – Frantic Films. Producer: Jamie Brown
- Debbie Travis' Facelift – Whalley-Abbey Media. Producers: Debbie Travis, Hans Rosenstein
- Divine Restoration – VisionTV. Producers: Stephen Ellis, Kip Spidell
- I Do, Let's Eat – Food Network. Producers: Dorene Lin, John Panikkar
- The Thirsty Traveler – Grasslands Entertainment. Producer: Bryan Smith

=== Best Lifestyle/Practical Information Segment ===
- On the Road Again – Film Club – Canadian Broadcasting Corporation. Producers: Louis Battistelli, Malcolm Hamilton, Aldo Columpsi, Roger Lefebvre
- Daily Planet – Martin Mars – Discovery Channel. Producer: Mark Miller
- Daily Planet – Blast Resistant Furniture – Discovery Channel. Producer: Devin Keshavjee
- SexTV – Alison Lapper – CHUM Television, Corus Entertainment. Producers: Cynthia Loyst, Judith Pyke
- The Shopping Bags – Force Four Entertainment, Worldwide Bag Media. Producers: Todd Serotiuk, Tony Hrkac, Brian Beard

=== Best Animated Program or Series ===
- Bromwell High – Decode Entertainment, Hat Trick Productions. Producers: Steve Denure, Neil Court, Beth Stevenson, Anil Gupta, Jimmy Mulville, Mario Stylianides, Cheryl Taylor
- Miss Spider's Sunny Patch Friends – The Prince, the Princess and the Bee – Nelvana, Callaway Arts & Entertainment. Producers: Scott Dyer, Nicholas Callaway, Patricia R. Burns, David Kirk, Nadine van der Velde, Jocelyn Hamilton, Doug Murphy, Pam Lehn
- Jane and the Dragon – Nelvana, Wētā Workshop. Producers: Richard Taylor, Martin Baynton, Patricia R. Burns, Scott Dyer, Jocelyn Hamilton, Doug Murphy, Andrew Smith, Michael McNeil.
- The Naughty Naughty Pets – Decode Entertainment, C.O.R.E. Producers: Steve Denure, Neil Court, Beth Stevenson, Wendy Gardner, Kim Hyde
- Atomic Betty – No-L9 – Atomic Cartoons, Breakthrough Entertainment, Tele Images Productions, Marathon Media. Producers: Steven Hecht, Ira Levy, Nghia Nguyen, Kirsten Scollie, Peter Williamson, Kevin Gillis, Rob Davies, Trevor Bentley

=== Best Pre-School Program or Series ===
- Gisèle's Big Backyard – Here, There and Everywhere – TVOntario. Producers: Gisèle Corinthios, Marie McCann, Pat Ellingson, Ericka Evans
- Miss BG – Breakthrough Entertainment, Ellipsanime. Producers: Steven Hecht, Ira Levy, Marie-Pierre Moulinjeune, Kirsten Scollie, Peter Williamson, Kevin Gillis, Roberta Rae
- Miss Spider's Sunny Patch Friends – Nelvana, Callaway Arts & Entertainment. Producers: Nadine Van der Velde, Jocelyn Hamilton, Nicholas Callaway, Pam Lehn, Scott Dyer, Doug Murphy, Andy Russell, Patricia R. Burns, David Kirk
- Poko – Halifax Film Company. Producers: Michael Donovan, Charles Bishop, Jeff Rosen, Katrina Walsh, Cheryl Wagner
- This is Daniel Cook – TVOntario, Treehouse TV, Marblemedia, Sinking Ship Entertainment. Producers: Matthew Bishop, Matthew Hornburg, J.J. Johnson, Blair Powers, Mark J.W. Bishop

=== Best Children’s or Youth Fiction Program or Series ===
- The Morgan Waters Show – Canadian Broadcasting Corporation. Producers: Martin Markle, Rachel Bartels, Jonathan Farber
- 15/Love – Marathon Media. Producers: Derek Schreyer, Arnie Gelbart, Olivier Brémond, Karen Troubetzkoy, Pascal Breton
- Dark Oracle – Cookie Jar Entertainment, Shaftesbury Films. Producers: Christina Jennings, Heather Conkie, Suzanne French, Scott Garvie, Laurie Mclarty, Jana Sinyor
- The Reading Rangers – TVOntario. Producers: Pat Ellingson, Marney Malabar, Jarrett Sherman
- renegadepress.com – Vérité Films. Producers: Virginia Thompson, Robert de Lint, Jordan Wheeler

=== Best Children's or Youth Non-Fiction Program or Series ===
- Street Cents – Canadian Broadcasting Corporation. Producers: Barbara Kennedy, Wendy Purves
- Heads Up! – Look Back Productions. Producer: Nick Orchard
- If The World Were a Village – 9 Story Media Group. Producers: Steve Jarosz, Vince Commisso, Peter Moss
- Prank Patrol – Apartment 11 Productions. Producers: Jonathan Finkelstein, Stacey Tenenbaum, David Hansen
- Rocked: Sum 41 in Congo – War Child Canada. Producers: Barbara Harmer, Eric Hoskins, Samantha Nutt, Adrian Callender

=== Best Sports Program or Series ===
- Hockey Brawl: Battle on Thin Ice – Nüman Films. Producers: Jeff Newman, Robert Sauvey, Shawn Watson
- the fifth estate – On the Edge of Glory – Canadian Broadcasting Corporation. Producers: David Studer, Caroline Harvey, Jane Mingay, Jim Williamson
- Girl Racers – Screen Siren Pictures. Producers: Trish Dolman, Stephanie Symns
- Girls Don't Fight – Infinity Films. Producers: Shel Piercy, Ken Craw
- Ice Storm: The Salé and Pelletier Affair – DocuTainment Plus Productions, Windchill Entertainment 1. Producers: Howard Bernstein, Richard Martyn, Mark Shekter, Garry Blye

=== Best Live Sporting Event ===
- 2006 World Junior Ice Hockey Championships – Gold Medal Game – TSN. Producers: Mark Milliere, Jon Hynes
- CFL on CBC – 93rd Grey Cup Championship – CBC Sports. Producers: Trevor Pilling, Joe Scarcelli
- NHL on TSN – Ottawa at Toronto – TSN. Producers: Mark Milliere, Doug Walton

=== Best Cross-Platform Project ===
- ReGenesis – regenesistv.com – The Movie Network, Movie Central, Shaftesbury Films. Producers: Patrick Crowe, Keith Clarkson, Evan Jones, Shane Kinnear, Thomas Wallner
- Hatching, Matching and Dispatching – hatchingmatchinganddispatching.com – CBC. Producers: Patrick Martin, Patrick Mackey
- This is Daniel Cook – thisisdanielcook.com – TVOntario, Treehouse TV, Marblemedia, Sinking Ship Entertainment. Producers: Matthew Hornburg, Cameron Mitchell, Blair Powers, Mark J.W. Bishop
- ZeD – zed.cbc.ca – Canadian Broadcasting Corporation. Producers: Sean Embury, Jennifer Ouano, Kevin Teichroeb
- Burnt Toast – burnttoastopera.com – Rhombus Media, Marblemedia. Producers: Matthew Hornburg, Cameron Mitchell, Blair Powers, Mark J.W. Bishop

=== Best Direction in a Dramatic Program or Miniseries ===
- Tim Southam – One Dead Indian (Sienna Films)
- Bruce McDonald – The Love Crimes of Gillian Guess (Force Four Entertainment/Citytv)
- T. W. Peacocke – Canada Russia '72 (CBC)
- Stephen Surjik – Intelligence: The Movie (Haddock Entertainment)
- Christian Duguay – Lies My Mother Told Me (Nomadic Pictures/CD Films/Randwell Productions)

=== Best Direction in a Dramatic Series ===
- Peter Wellington – Slings & Arrows – Brinam Wood (Rhombus Media)
- Ken Girotti – ReGenesis – Fishy (The Movie Network/Movie Central/Shaftesbury Films)
- Ron Murphy – ReGenesis – Gene in a Bottle (The Movie Network/Movie Central/Shaftesbury Films)
- Gail Harvey – This Is Wonderland (Muse Entertainment/Indian Grove Productions)
- Ken Finkleman – At the Hotel – Doesn't Anyone Want to Ask Me About My Dress? (One Hundred Percent Television)

=== Best Direction in a News Information Program or Series ===
- Michael Gruzuk – Marketplace – Chasing the Cancer Answer (CBC)
- Marijka Hurko – CBC News: Correspondent – Uganda's Haunted Children : The Hard Road Home (CBC)
- Cynthia Banks – the fifth estate – A Hail of Bullets (CBC)
- Harvey Cashore – the fifth estate – Money, Truth and Spin (CBC)
- Douglas Arrowsmith, Stuart Coxe – the fifth estate – Tsunami: Untold Stories (CBC)

=== Best Direction in a Documentary Program ===
- Paul Nadler – Braindamadj'd...Take II (Apartment 11 Productions)
- Julian Jones – How William Shatner Changed the World (Mentorn Media/Handel Productions)
- Christine Nielsen – Rocketman (Barna-Alper Productions)
- Mike Sheerin – The Secret Mulroney Tapes (CBC)

=== Best Direction in a Documentary Series ===
- David Rabinovitch – Secret Files of the Inquisition – Tears of Spain (Insight Film Studios)
- Michael McNamara – Shrines and Homemade Holy Places – Highways to Heaven (Markham Street Films)
- Michelle Metivier – The Nature of Things – Fighting Fire With Fire (CBC)
- Robin Bicknell – The World's Strangest UFO Stories – Roswell: The Truth (Mentorn, Proper Television)
- Ziad Touma, Joshua Dorsey – Webdreams – Episode 1009 (Galafilm)

=== Best Direction in a Comedy Program or Series ===
- James Allodi – Naked Josh – Fake It Till You Make It (Sextant Productions/Cirrus Communications)
- Shawn Thompson – Puppets Who Kill – The Joyride (Eggplant Picture & Sound)
- Jim Donovan – Naked Josh – The Loneliness of the Long Distance Lover (Sextant Productions/Cirrus Communications)
- Stephen Reynolds – Hatching, Matching and Dispatching (CBC)
- Bruce McDonald – The Tournament – The Pee-Wee Summit Series (Adjacent 2 Entertainment/CBC)

=== Best Direction in a Variety Program or Series ===
- Mario Rouleau – Voices of Soul
- David Storey – Comic Genius (Vérité Films)
- Joan Tosoni – Juno Awards of 2006 (Canadian Academy of Recording Arts and Sciences/CTV)
- Mario Rouleau – Paul Anka: Rock Swings – Live at the Montreal Jazz Festival
- Anthony Browne, Don Spence, Adrian Callender – The TO Variety Show – Toronto Jams (Insight Productions)

=== Best Direction in a Performing Arts Program or Series ===
- Tim Southam – Perreault Dancer (Danser Perreault) (Les Films de l'Isle)
- Mark Lawrence – Opening Night – Kronos Quartet – CBC
- Larry Weinstein – Burnt Toast (Rhombus Media/Marblemedia)
- Oana Suteu – Wire Frame
- Jennifer Baichwal, Nicholas de Pencier – OAC Compendium (Mercury Films)

=== Best Direction in a Lifestyle/Practical Information Program or Series ===
- Trevor Grant – Chef at Home – Hors d'Oeuvres Party (Ocean Entertainment)
- John Dolin – Handyman Superstar Challenge – Pitch and Play (HSSC Productions)
- Shannon Mckinnon – Opening Soon – Century (Red Apple Entertainment)
- Edi Osghian – The Next Great Chef – Ontario (Next Entertainment)
- Karen Pinker – Valerie Pringle Has Left The Building (CTV)
- Leslie Merklinger – Opening Soon: By Design – Got Style (Red Apple Entertainment)

=== Best Direction in a Children's or Youth Program or Series ===
- Paolo Barzman – 15/Love – Volley of the Dolls (Marathon Media)
- Ron Murphy – Dark Oracle – TrailBlaze (Cookie Jar Entertainment/Shaftesbury Films)
- Philip Marcus – Dragon (Cité-Amérique/Scholastic/Scopas Medien/Image Plus/Sovik)
- Jamie Whitney – If The World Were a Village (9 Story Media Group)
- Brian Duchscherer, Chuck Rubin, Stan Gadziola – Poko – Poko & Bibi of the Arctic (Halifax Film Company)

=== Best Direction in a Live Sporting Event ===
- Paul Hemming – 2006 World Junior Ice Hockey Championships – Gold Medal Game (TSN)
- Geoff Johnson – 2006 Tim Hortons Brier (TSN)
- Ron Forsythe – CFL on CBC – 93rd Grey Cup Championship (CBC Sports)

=== Best Writing in a Dramatic Program or Miniseries ===
- Andrew Wreggitt, Hugh Graham – One Dead Indian (Sienna Films)
- Chris Haddock – Intelligence: The Movie (Haddock Entertainment)
- Gordon Pinsent – Heyday! (Pope Productions/Triptych Media)
- Bruce M. Smith – Prairie Giant: The Tommy Douglas Story (CBC
- Ian Adams, Riley Adams, Michelle Lovretta – Hunt for Justice: The Louise Arbour Story (Galafilm/TATfilm)
- Suzette Couture – The Man Who Lost Himself (Sarrazin Couture Entertainment)

=== Best Writing in a Dramatic Series ===
- Susan Coyne, Bob Martin, Mark McKinney – Slings & Arrows – Steeped in Blood (Rhombus Media)
- George F. Walker, Dani Romain – This Is Wonderland – Episode 313 (Muse Entertainment/Indian Grove Productions)
- Angus Fraser – Terminal City – Episode 6 (Crescent Entertainment/Big Dog Productions)
- Ken Finkleman, Morwyn Brebner, Ellen Vanstone – At the Hotel – The Perfect Couple (One Hundred Percent Television)

=== Best Writing in a Comedy or Variety Program or Series ===
- Mary Walsh, Ed Macdonald – Hatching, Matching and Dispatching – Episode 5 (CBC)
- Brent Butt, Mark Farrell, Kevin White, Paul Mather – Corner Gas – Merry Gasmas (CTV Television Network/Prairie Pants Productions)
- Dan Redican – Burnt Toast (Rhombus Media/Marblemedia)
- Steve Smith, Rick Green, David C. Smith – The Red Green Show – Do As I Do (Red Green Productions)
- Jennifer Kennedy, Ian Ross MacDonald – The Wilkinsons – Ulterior Designs (Henry Less Productions)
- Mark Critch, Kevin White, Gary Pearson, Carolyn Clifford-Taylor, Irwin Barker, Jennifer Whalen, Bob Kerr, Barry Julien, Gavin Crawford – This Hour Has 22 Minutes – Episode 7 (Alliance Atlantis/CBC)

=== Best Writing in an Information Program or Series ===
- Linden MacIntyre – the fifth estate – Hail of Bullets (CBC)
- Bob McKeown – the fifth estate – Rogue Agent (CBC)
- Gillian Findlay – the fifth estate – Failing Jeffrey (CBC)
- Sandra Batson – CBC News: Regina – Shedding the Past (CBC)
- Cindy Bahadur – Daily Planet – Grounded Gollum (Discovery Channel)

=== Best Writing in a Documentary Program or Series ===
- Neil Docherty – China Rises – Party Games (CBC/New York Times Television)
- Jonathan Finkelstein, Paul Nadler – Braindamadj'd...Take II (Apartment 11 Productions)
- Nadine Pequeneza – Turning Points of History – Aristide’s Haiti (Barna-Alper Productions/Connections Productions)
- Ric Esther Bienstock – Frontline: Sex Slaves (CBC/Channel 4/Canal D/PBS)
- Paul Cowan – The Peacekeepers (13 Production/Arte)

=== Best Writing in a Children's or Youth's Program or Series ===
- Jordan Wheeler – renegadepress.com – The Rez (Vérité Films)
- Steven Westren – Dragon – Dragon Runs the Store (Cité-Amérique/Scholastic/Scopas Medien/Image Plus/Sovik)
- Bob McDonald, Ken Hewitt-White – Heads Up! – How Do We Get Around in Space? (Look Back Productions)
- Richard Elliott, Simon Racioppa – Jane and the Dragon – A Dragon's Tail (Nelvana/Wētā Workshop)
- Dennis Heaton – The Naughty Naughty Pets – Sock It To Me (Decode Entertainment/C.O.R.E.)

=== Best Performance by an Actor in a Leading Role in a Dramatic Program or Miniseries ===
- Tom McCamus – Waking Up Wally: The Walter Gretzky Story (Accent Entertainment/Alberta Filmworks)
- Tony Nardi – Il Duce Canadese (Ciné Télé Action)
- Ian Tracey – Intelligence: The Movie (Haddock Entertainment)
- Michael Therriault – Prairie Giant: The Tommy Douglas Story (CBC
- Shawn Ashmore – Terry (Shaftesbury Films)
- Peter Outerbridge – Murdoch Mysteries: Under the Dragon's Tail (Shaftesbury Films)

=== Best Performance by an Actress in a Leading Role in a Dramatic Program or Miniseries ===
- Wendy Crewson – The Man Who Lost Himself (Sarrazin Couture Entertainment)
- Klea Scott – Intelligence: The Movie (Haddock Entertainment)
- Joanne Kelly – Playing House (Blueprint Entertainment)
- Michèle-Barbara Pelletier – Trudeau II: Maverick in the Making (Big Motion Pictures)
- Victoria Snow – Waking Up Wally: The Walter Gretzky Story (Accent Entertainment/Alberta Filmworks)

=== Best Performance by an Actor in a Continuing Leading Dramatic Role ===
- Mark McKinney – Slings & Arrows – Steeped in Blood (Rhombus Media)
- Peter Outerbridge – ReGenesis – Fishy (The Movie Network/Movie Central/Shaftesbury Films)
- Gil Bellows – Terminal City – Episode 9 (Crescent Entertainment/Big Dog Productions)
- Nigel Bennett – At the Hotel – Doesn't Anyone Want to Ask Me About My Dress? (One Hundred Percent Television)
- Nicholas Campbell – Da Vinci's City Hall – Put Down the Hose, Pick Up a Gun (Haddock Entertainment/Barna-Alper Productions)

=== Best Performance by an Actress in a Continuing Leading Dramatic Role ===
- Martha Burns – Slings & Arrows – Brinam Wood (Rhombus Media)
- Cara Pifko – This Is Wonderland – Episode 313 (Muse Entertainment/Indian Grove Productions)
- Andrea Menard – Moccasin Flats – Domestic Bliss (Stephen Onda Productions/Big Soul Productions)
- Erin Karpluk – Godiva's – Inked (Keatley Entertainment/CHUM)
- Martha Henry – At the Hotel – Welcome to the Rousseau (One Hundred Percent Television)

=== Best Performance by an Actor in a Guest Role Dramatic Series ===
- Maury Chaykin – At the Hotel – The Perfect Couple (One Hundred Percent Television)
- Billy MacLellan – ReGenesis – Fishy (The Movie Network/Movie Central/Shaftesbury Films)
- Ryan McDonald – ReGenesis – Haze (The Movie Network/Movie Central/Shaftesbury Films)
- John Ralston – This Is Wonderland – Episode 302 (Muse Entertainment/Indian Grove Productions)
- Stephen E. Miller – Da Vinci's City Hall – When the Horsemen Come Looking (Haddock Entertainment/Barna-Alper Productions)

=== Best Performance by an Actress in a Guest Role Dramatic Series ===
- Linda Kash – At the Hotel – The Perfect Couple (One Hundred Percent Television)
- Rachel McAdams – Slings & Arrows – Season’s End (Rhombus Media)
- Hélène Joy – ReGenesis – Escape Mutant (The Movie Network/Movie Central/Shaftesbury Films)
- Nancy Beatty – This Is Wonderland – Episode 309 (Muse Entertainment/Indian Grove Productions)
- Liisa Repo-Martell – This Is Wonderland – Episode 302 (Muse Entertainment/Indian Grove Productions)

=== Best Performance by an Actor in a Featured Supporting Role in a Dramatic Series ===
- Paul Soles – Terminal City: "Episode 6" (Crescent Entertainment/Big Dog Productions)
- Michael Filipowich – Charlie Jade: "Choosing Sides" (CinéGroupe/CHUM/IDC South Africa)
- Michael McMurtry – Godiva's: "Champagne Kisses" (Keatley Entertainment/CHUM)
- Michael Murphy – This Is Wonderland: Episode 302" (Muse Entertainment/Indian Grove Productions)
- Rick Tae – Godiva's: "Rubbing Shoulders" (Keatley Entertainment/CHUM)

=== Best Performance by an Actress in a Featured Supporting Role in a Dramatic Series ===
- Susan Coyne – Slings & Arrows: "Fair Is Foul and Foul Is Fair" (Rhombus Media)
- Jayne Eastwood – This Is Wonderland: "Episode 301" (Muse Entertainment/Indian Grove Productions)
- Patricia McKenzie – Charlie Jade: "Dirty Laundry" (CinéGroupe/CHUM/IDC South Africa)
- Sarah Strange – ReGenesis: "Dim & Dimmer" (The Movie Network/Movie Central/Shaftesbury Films)
- Kathryn Winslow – This Is Wonderland: "Episode 306" (Muse Entertainment/Indian Grove Productions)

=== Best Performance by an Actor in a Featured Supporting Role in a Dramatic Program or Miniseries ===
- Judah Katz – Canada Russia '72 (CBC)
- Gary Farmer – One Dead Indian (Sienna Films)
- Ryan McDonald – Terry (Shaftesbury Films)
- Don McKellar – Prairie Giant: The Tommy Douglas Story (CBC)
- Dino Tavarone – Il Duce Canadese (Ciné Télé Action)

=== Best Performance by an Actress in a Featured Supporting Role in a Dramatic Program or Miniseries ===
- Lushin Dubey – Murder Unveiled (CBC)
- Isabelle Blais – Human Trafficking (Muse Entertainment)
- Megan Follows – Shania: A Life in Eight Albums (Barna-Alper Productions)
- Hélène Joy – Murdoch Mysteries: Under the Dragon's Tail (Shaftesbury Films)

=== Best Individual Performance in a Comedy Program or Series ===
- Mark McKinney – Robson Arms: "Material Breach" (Omnifilm Entertainment/Creative Atlantic Communications)
- Brigitte Bako – G-Spot: "HBO" (Barna-Alper Productions/Corus Entertainment/Serendipity Point Films/The Movie Network)
- Danny Bhoy – Just for Laughs (Just for Laughs Comedy Festival/Les Films Rozon)
- Derek Edwards – Halifax Comedy Festival: "Episode 2" (CBC)
- Jeremy Hotz – Just for Laughs (Just for Laughs Comedy Festival/Les Films Rozon)
- Richard Waugh – Jimmy MacDonald's Canada: "The Lost Episodes – The Canadian Sexplosion" (CBC)

=== Best Ensemble Performance in a Comedy Program or Series ===
- Shaun Majumder, Cathy Jones, Mark Critch, Gavin Crawford – This Hour Has 22 Minutes – Episode 7 (Alliance Atlantis/CBC)
- Eric Peterson, Brent Butt, Lorne Cardinal, Gabrielle Miller, Janet Wright, Tara Spencer-Nairn, Fred Ewanuick, Nancy Robertson – Corner Gas – Merry Gasmas (CTV Television Network/Prairie Pants Productions)
- Luba Goy, Don Ferguson, Roger Abbott, Alan Park, Jessica Holmes, Craig Lauzon – Air Farce Live – AFTV 13-09 (CBC)
- Steve Smith, Rick Green, Laurie Elliott, Patrick McKenna, Wayne Robson, Bob Bainborough, Jeff Lumby – The Red Green Show – Do As I Do (Red Green Productions)
- Swikriti Sarkar, Ari Cohen, Christian Potenza, Paula Boudreau, Alain Goulem, Cas Anvar, Richard Jutras, Louis Philippe Dandenault, Kate Greenhouse, Tracey Hoyt – The Tournament – The Warrior Women (Adjacent 2 Entertainment/CBC)

=== Best Performance or Host in a Variety Program or Series ===
- k.d. lang – Words to Music: The Canadian Songwriters Hall of Fame 2006 – Hallelujah (Cansong Productions)
- Jully Black, Charmaine Allen, Nadia Goode, Andrea Hall, Camille Harrison, Jean Lawrence, Lloyd Lawrence, Kaisha Lee, Ermine Lewis, Shenelle Morgan, Teena Riley, Sharon Riley, Nevon Sinclair, Oneil Watson, Sarah Brown, Stephen Lewis – Words to Music: The Canadian Songwriters Hall of Fame 2006 – Put Your Hand in the Hand (Cansong Productions)
- Mike Smith, John Paul Tremblay, Robb Wells – 2006 East Coast Music Awards (East Coast Music Association/CBC Halifax)
- Brent Butt – Comic Genius (Vérité Films)
- Derek Miller – The TO Variety Show – Toronto Jams (Insight Productions)

=== Best Performance in a Performing Arts Program or Series ===
- Amanda Green, Sarah Murphy-Dyson, Zhang Wei-Qiang, Jesus Corrales, Johnny Wright, Tara Birtwhistle, Chelsey Lindsay, Cindy Marie Small, Jo-Ann Sundermeier, Janet Sartore, Dmitri Dorgoselets, Vanessa Lawson – The Tale of the Magic Flute (Vonnie Von Helmolt Film)
- Brianna Lombardo, Michelle Rhode, Simon Alarie, Melanie Demers, Patrick Lamothe, Maurice Fraga, Audrey Thibodeau, Robert Meilleur, Marie-Eve Nadeau – Wire Frame
- Isabel Bayrakdarian – A Long Journey Home (Greenspace Production)
- Andrea Menard – The Velvet Devil
- Sarah Slean – Black Widow (Enigmatico Films/Holland Park Productions)

=== Best Performance in a Children’s or Youth Program or Series ===
- Ksenia Solo – renegadepress.com – Fear (Vérité Films)
- Meaghan Rath – 15/Love – Comfort Zone (Marathon Media)
- Paula Brancati – Dark Oracle – Life Interrupted (Cookie Jar Entertainment/Shaftesbury Films)
- Michael Seater – Life with Derek – Grade Point: Average (Shaftesbury Films/Pope Productions)
- Ishan Davé – renegadepress.com – This is Your Brain on Love (Vérité Films)

=== Best Achievement in Casting ===
- Jenny Lewis, Sara Kay – Heyday! (Pope Productions/Triptych Media)
- Carmen Kotyk – Prairie Giant: The Tommy Douglas Story (CBC
- Marsha Chesley – This Is Wonderland – Episode 308 (Muse Entertainment/Indian Grove Productions)
- Marjorie Lecker, Donna Rae Gibbs, Sheila Lane – Canada Russia '72 (CBC)
- Robin D. Cook, Rosina Bucci – One Dead Indian (Sienna Films)

=== Best News Anchor ===
- Kevin Newman – Global National (Global)
- Norma Lee MacLeod – CBC News: Halifax at 6:00 – Sri Lanka Diary (Canadian Broadcasting Corporation)
- Peter Mansbridge – The National/CBC News (CBC)

=== Best Reportage ===
- Patrick Brown – The National/CBC News (CBC)
- Terry Milewski – Canada Now – Pacific Edition (Canadian Broadcasting Corporation)
- Neil Macdonald – The National/CBC News – Abortion Law (CBC)
- Adrienne Arsenault – The National/CBC News (CBC)
- Anna Rodrigues, Terry O'Keefe, Peter Silverman – CityNews (Citytv)

=== Best Host or Interviewer in a News Information Program or Series ===
- Peter Mansbridge – The National/CBC News – Canada Votes – Your Turn with the Leaders (CBC)
- Erica Johnson – Marketplace (CBC)
- Wendy Mesley – Marketplace – Heart of the Matter, Buying Into Sexy (CBC)
- Gillian Findlay – the fifth estate – Failing Jeffrey (CBC)
- Bob McKeown – the fifth estate – Rogue Agent (CBC)

=== Best Host or Interviewer in a General/Human Interest or Talk Program or Series ===
- George Stroumboulopoulos – George Stroumboulopoulos Tonight (CBC)
- Evan Solomon – CBC News: Sunday (CBC)
- Kim Cattrall – Kim Cattrall: Sexual Intelligence (Optix Digital Pictures)
- Steve Paikin – Studio 2 – Canada's Role in the World (TVOntario)
- Simcha Jacobovici – The Naked Archaeologist – Delilah's People (AP TSU Productions/Associated Producers)

=== Best Host in a Lifestyle/Practical Information, or Performing Arts Program or Series ===
- Seán Cullen – What Were They Thinking? (Soapbox)
- Mike Holmes – Holmes on Homes (General Purpose Entertainment)
- Valerie Pringle – Valerie Pringle Has Left The Building – Haida G'waii (CTV)
- Dina Pugliese – Much Music VJ Search: The Series – Episode 2 (Insight Productions)
- Debbie Travis – Debbie Travis' Facelift (Whalley-Abbey Media)

=== Best Host or Interviewer in a Sports Program or Sportscast ===
- Ron MacLean – Hockey Day in Canada (CBC Sports)
- Michael Landsberg – Off the Record with Michael Landsberg (TSN)
- Brian Williams – Torino 2006: The Olympic Winter Games on CBC – Olympic Prime Time (CBC Sports)

=== Best Sports Play-by-Play or Analyst ===
- Glen Suitor, Chris Cuthbert – CFL on TSN – Wendy's CFL Live: Calgary at Saskatchewan (TSN)
- Scott Russell, Jack Sasseville, Barbara Underhill, Paul Martini, Mark Lee – Torino 2006: The Olympic Winter Games on CBC – Olympic Afternoon (CBC Sports)

=== Best Photography in a Dramatic Program or Series ===
- Danny Nowak – The Love Crimes of Gillian Guess (Force Four Entertainment/Citytv)
- François Dagenais – Heyday! (Pope Productions/Triptych Media)
- David Herrington – Plague City: SARS in Toronto (Lionsgate Television/Slanted Wheel Entertainment)
- Pierre Letarte – Prairie Giant: The Tommy Douglas Story (CBC
- Gregory Middleton – Murder Unveiled (CBC)

=== Best Photography in a Comedy, Variety, Performing Arts Program or Series ===
- David Franco – Burnt Toast (Rhombus Media/Marblemedia)
- Paul Sarossy – Black Widow (Enigmatico Films/Holland Park Productions)
- Brian Johnson – The Score (Screen Siren Pictures)
- Milan Podsedly – The Tale of the Magic Flute (Vonnie Von Helmolt Film)
- Walter Corbett – Yours, Al (Real to Reel Productions)

=== Best Photography in an Information Program or Series ===
- Damir I. Chytil, J.P. Locherer – Forensic Factor – Betrayed (Exploration Production)
- John Badcock – the fifth estate – Hail of Bullets (CBC)
- Jim Nilson, Don Scott, Jaison Empson – CBC News: Country Canada – Legacy: The Will to Survive (CBC)
- Ian Kerr – The Next Great Chef – Ontario (Next Entertainment)
- Ben Matilainen – Marketplace – Chasing the Cancer Answer (CBC)

=== Best Photography in a Documentary Program or Series ===
- François Dagenais – POV – No More Tears Sister (NFB)
- John Minh Tran – Cheating Death (Creative Differences)
- Claudine Sauvé – Lifelike
- Pieter Stathis – Secret Files of the Inquisition (Insight Film Studios)
- Alberto Feio – Their Brothers' Keepers: Orphaned by AIDS (Bullfrog Films)

=== Best Visual Effects ===
- Mary Holding, Matt Hansen, Thomas Turnbull, Ariel Joson, Graham Cunningham, Robert Crowther, Ian Britton – Terry (Shaftesbury Films)
- Michelle Comens, Erica Henderson, Stephen Bahr, Krista McLean, Jeremy Hampton, Christopher Stewart, Robin Hackl, James Kawano – Stargate SG-1 – Camelot (Stargate SG-1 Productions)
- Brendon Morfitt, Mark Savela, Vinay Mehta, Anuk Patil, James Rorick, Craig Van Den Biggelaar, Karen Watson, Kyle Winkleman – Stargate SG-1 – Beachhead (Stargate SG-1 Productions)
- François Vachon, Christian Garcia, Michel Lemire, Stéphane Landry – Charlie Jade (CinéGroupe/CHUM/IDC South Africa)
- Jason Sharpe, Sonya Amin, Eddy Xuab – ReGenesis – Escape Mutant (The Movie Network/Movie Central/Shaftesbury Films)

=== Best Picture Editing in a Dramatic Program or Series ===
- Dean Soltys – Canada Russia '72 (CBC)
- Isabelle Levesque – Charlie Jade: "Choosing Sides" (CinéGroupe/CHUM/IDC South Africa)
- Dominique Fortin – Hunt for Justice: The Louise Arbour Story (Galafilm/TATfilm)
- Debra Karen – One Dead Indian (Sienna Films)
- Paul G. Day – This Is Wonderland: "Episode 310" (Muse Entertainment/Indian Grove Productions)

=== Best Picture Editing in a Comedy, Variety, Performing Arts Program or Series ===
- Miles Davren, Alan MacLean – Rick Mercer Report (CBC Television/Island Edge)
- David Ostry – Black Widow (Enigmatico Films/Holland Park Productions)
- David New – Burnt Toast (Rhombus Media/Marblemedia)
- John Reynolds, Ken Yan, Jim Goertzen, Marc Dupont – The TO Variety Show – Toronto Jams (Insight Productions)
- David Hoffert – The Wilkinsons – Nashville (Henry Less Productions)

=== Best Picture Editing in an Information Program or Series ===
- Aileen McBride – Marketplace – Chasing the Cancer Answer (CBC)
- Chris Cassino – 72 Hours: True Crime – Betrayed (Kensington Communications/Creative Anarchy/Meech Grant Productions)
- Deane Bennett – Crash Test Mommy – Dana Weeks (Paperny Entertainment)
- Tim Wanlin – Stuntdawgs – Pipe Ramp (Lucky Bastard Films/Omnifilm Entertainment)
- Sophie Mardirossian – The Family Restaurant (Anaid Productions)

=== Best Picture Editing in a Documentary Program or Series ===
- Howard Goldberg – How William Shatner Changed the World (Mentorn Media/Handel Productions)
- Nick Hector – Memory for Max, Claire, Ida and Company (TVOntario)
- Oana Suteu – Lifelike
- Zsolt Luka – Braindamadj'd...Take II (Apartment 11 Productions)
- Bruce Lange – Five Days in September: The Rebirth of an Orchestra (Rhombus Media)

=== Best Production Design or Art Direction in a Dramatic Program or Series ===
- Guy Lalande – Human Trafficking (Muse Entertainment)
- Rob Gray – The Love Crimes of Gillian Guess (Force Four Entertainment/Citytv)
- Marian Wihak, Ane Christensen – Heyday! (Pope Productions/Triptych Media)
- Kim Wall, Kathy McCoy – Prairie Giant: The Tommy Douglas Story (CBC
- Jennifer Stewart – Trudeau II: Maverick in the Making (Big Motion Pictures)

=== Best Production Design or Art Direction in a Non-Dramatic Program or Series ===
- Andrew Kinsella – 2006 Canadian Country Music Awards (Canadian Country Music Association/CBC Television)
- Mario Hervieux – Naked Josh – Baring It all (Sextant Productions/Cirrus Communications)
- Sherri Hay – The Surreal Gourmet – The Newlyfeds (Salad Daze Productions)
- James Hazell – The Next Great Chef – Ontario (Next Entertainment)

=== Best Costume Design ===
- Mariane Carter – Human Trafficking (Muse Entertainment)
- Alex Reda – Black Widow (Enigmatico Films/Holland Park Productions)
- Lea Carlson – Heyday! (Pope Productions/Triptych Media)
- Anne Duceppe – Il Duce Canadese (Ciné Télé Action)
- Jennifer Haffenden – Waking Up Wally: The Walter Gretzky Story (Accent Entertainment/Alberta Filmworks)

=== Best Achievement in Make-Up ===
- Donald Mowat, Jane Meade, Paula Fleet – Prairie Giant: The Tommy Douglas Story (CBC
- Jan Newman, Todd Masters – Stargate SG-1 – Origin (Stargate SG-1 Productions)
- Catherine Davies Irvine – Terry (Shaftesbury Films)
- Penny Lee, Karen Byers – This Hour Has 22 Minutes – Episode 8 (Alliance Atlantis/CBC)
- Betty Belmore – Trudeau II: Maverick in the Making (Big Motion Pictures)

=== Best Sound in a Dramatic Program ===
- Martin Lee, Lou Solakofski, Sid Lieberman, Garrett Kerr, Yvon Benoît, David McCallum – One Dead Indian (Sienna Films)
- Louis Gignac, Michel B. Bordeleau, Natalie Fleurant, Hans Peter Strobl – Human Trafficking (Muse Entertainment)
- Claude Beaugrand, Claude La Haye, Bernard Gariépy Strobl – Hunt for Justice: The Louise Arbour Story (Galafilm/TATfilm)
- Al Sherbin, Evan Rust, Steve Hasiak, Warren St. Onge, Rob Bryanton – Prairie Giant: The Tommy Douglas Story (CBC
- Allan Fung, Mark Gingras, John Douglas Smith, Martin Lee, Tom Bjelic, Tim O’Connell, John Laing, Ian Rankin – Shania: A Life in Eight Albums (Barna-Alper Productions)

=== Best Sound in a Dramatic Series ===
- Sylvain Bourgault, Éric Ladouceur – Charlie Jade – Spin (CinéGroupe/CHUM/IDC South Africa)
- Nicole Thompson, Brad Hillman, James Fonnyadt, Gina Mueller, Miguel Nunes, Chris Duesterdiek – Da Vinci's City Hall – Gotta Press the Flesh (Haddock Entertainment/Barna-Alper Productions)
- Gord Hillier, Kirby Jinnah, Kevin Sands, Steve Smith, David Hibbert – Stargate Atlantis – The Hive (Acme Shark Productions/Sony Pictures Television)
- Gord Hillier, Kirby Jinnah, Devan Kraushar, Wayne Finucan, David Hibbert – Stargate SG-1 – Camelot (Stargate SG-1 Productions)
- Chris Duesterdiek, Dean Giammarco, Bill Sheppard – Terminal City – Episode 6 (Crescent Entertainment/Big Dog Productions)

=== Best Sound in a Comedy, Variety, or Performing Arts Program or Series ===
- David Rose, Michael LaCroix, Lou Solakofski, Donna G. Powell, Kirk Lynds – Burnt Toast (Rhombus Media/Marblemedia)
- Danny Greenspoon, Mark Radu, John Lacina, Ian Dunbar – 2006 Canadian Country Music Awards – (Canadian Country Music Association/CBC Television)
- Ryan Araki, Simon Berry, Stefan Fraticelli, Stephen Muir, Peter Thillaye – Jane and the Dragon – A Dragon's Tail (Nelvana/Wētā Workshop)
- Steve Cupani, Karndeep Jassal – Jimmy MacDonald's Canada: The Lost Episodes – The Canadian Sexplosion (CBC)
- John J. Thomson, Steve Hammond, Ronayne Higginson, Kirk Lynds, David McCallum, David Rose, Lou Solakofski – Black Widow (Enigmatico Films/Holland Park Productions)

=== Best Sound in an Information/Documentary Program or Series ===
- Steve Cupani – Extreme Weather – Wind and Water
- Stuart French, Lou Solakofski, Doug Doctor, Jane Tattersall, Ao Loo, David Rose – Five Days in September: The Rebirth of an Orchestra (Rhombus Media)
- Ric Jurgens, John Martin – A Town in Africa
- Jason Milligan, Michael Bonini – Memory for Max, Claire, Ida and Company (TVOntario)
- Alex Salter, Serge Boivin – Silent Messengers (Picture Plant)

=== Best Original Music Score for a Program or Miniseries ===
- Jonathan Goldsmith – Trudeau II: Maverick in the Making (Big Motion Pictures)
- Jonathan Goldsmith – Black Widow (Enigmatico Films/Holland Park Productions)
- Robert Carli – Terry (Shaftesbury Films)
- Christopher Dedrick – The Man Who Lost Himself (Sarrazin Couture Entertainment)
- Peter Allen – The Score (Screen Siren Pictures)

=== Best Original Music Score for a Dramatic Series ===
- Jim McGrath – Degrassi: The Next Generation – Our Lips Are Sealed (Bell Media/Epitome Pictures)
- Tom Third – ReGenesis – Dim & Dimmer (The Movie Network/Movie Central/Shaftesbury Films)
- Donald Quan – Moccasin Flats – The Other Side (Stephen Onda Productions/Big Soul Productions)
- Robert Carli – At the Hotel – Modern Solutions to Modern Problems (One Hundred Percent Television)
- Gary Koftinoff – Life with Derek – Babe Raider (Shaftesbury Films/Pope Productions)

=== Best Original Music Score for a Documentary Program or Series ===
- Bertrand Chénier – Perreault Dancer (Danser Perreault) (Les Films de l'Isle)
- Geoff Bennett, Longo Hai, Ben Johannesen – Kim Cattrall: Sexual Intelligence (Optix Digital Pictures)
- Freeworm – Black Coffee – Gold in Your Cup (NFB)
- Alexina Louie, Alex Pauk – The Face of Victory
- Donald Quan – The In between World of M.G. Vassanji (Clearview Productions/Cogent/Benger Productions)

=== Best Original Music Score for an Animated Program or Series ===
- Jeff Danna, Steven Sullivan – Miss Spider's Sunny Patch Friends – The Prince, the Princess and the Bee (Nelvana/Callaway Arts & Entertainment)
- Geoff Bennett, Ben Johannesen, Longo Hai – Jane and the Dragon – Shall We Dance? (Nelvana/Wētā Workshop)
- Blain Morris – Poko – Poko & Bibi of the Arctic (Halifax Film Company)
- Raymond C. Fabi – Dragon – Dragon Runs the Store (Cité-Amérique/Scholastic/Scopas Medien/Image Plus/Sovik)
- Jono Grant – Captain Flamingo – Episode 101 (Atomic Cartoons/Breakthrough Entertainment/Heroic Television/Philippine Animation Studio)

=== Special awards ===
- Gordon Sinclair Award for Broadcast Journalism – Hana Gartner
- Earle Grey Award – Donnelly Rhodes
- Academy Achievement Award – Bob Culbert
- Canada Award: Michael J. F. Scott, Anand Ramayya, Melanie Jackson, Dennis Jackson – Wapos Bay – There's No ‘I’ In Hockey
- Gemini Award for Outstanding Technical Achievement: Ross Video, OpenGear Terminal Equipment Platform
- Margaret Collier Award: Peter White
- Gemini Humanitarian Award – Beverly Thomson
- Viewer's Choice Award for Lifestyle Host: Marilyn Denis, CityLine
- Gemini Award for Most Popular Website Competition: Jay Ziebarth, Jason Diesbourg – Sons of Butcher
