= House Calls =

House Calls might refer to:

- House call, a visit at home from a doctor
- House Calls (1978 film), a 1978 motion picture that starred Walter Matthau, Glenda Jackson, Art Carney and Richard Benjamin
- House Calls (2006 film), a 2006 National Film Board of Canada documentary
- House Calls (TV series), a 1979–1982 CBS sitcom starring Wayne Rogers, Lynn Redgrave and Sharon Gless, based on the 1978 film
- House Calls: The Big Brother Talk Show, a live Internet talk show that corresponds with the American version of Big Brother, hosted by Gretchen Massey
- "House Calls" (A Touch of Frost), a 1997 television episode
