= Jean-Pierre Perreault =

Canadian choreographer (1947–2002)

Jean-Pierre Perreault (February 16, 1947 - December 4, 2002) was a Canadian dancer and choreographer.

== Background ==
Born and raised in Montreal, he began his career as a dancer with Jeanne Renaud's Le Groupe de la Place Royale in 1965, becoming co-artistic director with Peter Boneham of the company by 1971. He remained with the company until 1981, when he resigned to pursue his choreography career independently.

== Joe ==
Joe, his most famous dance work, was originally created for dance students at the Université du Québec à Montréal in 1983.

The show, a work for 32 dancers set to the rhythm of their army boots pounding on the floor as they danced, saw several further remounts and international tours over the next number of years, as well as a television adaptation in 1996.

== Fondation Jean-Pierre Perreault ==
In 1984 he launched his own dance company, Fondation Jean-Pierre Perreault. Many of the company's works featured echoes of Joe. In 1986, he created a special site-specific work, The Highway '86 Event, for Expo 86.

His noted later works included Nuit, Flykt, Piazza, Les Années de pélérinage, Eironos and The Adieux Cycle.

Perreault was also a visual artist, with most of his dance works beginning as drawings or paintings before being expanded into full works with movement and set design based on the original artwork. Some of his artworks also received exhibition in galleries and touring art shows independently of the dance pieces.

His last major work, The Comforts of Solitude, was commissioned by James Kudelka for the National Arts Centre.

He died of cancer in December 2002. His dance company initially tried to continue staging his works under new direction, but ceased operations within a couple of years.

== Honours ==
He was a two-time Jean A. Chalmers Award recipient, receiving the regular award in 1990 and a lifetime achievement award in 1996.

In 2002 he was named a recipient of the Governor General's Performing Arts Award, just a few months before his death.

In 2004 he was posthumously inducted as an officer of the National Order of Quebec.

In 2005 he was the subject of two documentary television films, Jean-Pierre Perreault: Giant Steps (Le petit Jean-Pierre, le grand Perreault) by Paule Baillargeon and Perreault Dancer (Danser Perreault) by Tim Southam.

== Works ==
- Trilogie III (1972)
- Les Bessons (1972)
- Les Bessons II (1973)
- Continental (1973)
- Moustières (1973)
- Galapagos (1974)
- Monuments (1975)
- Danse pour sept voix (1976)
- Nouveaux espaces (1976)
- 100 000 signes (1976)
- Dernière paille (1977)
- Nanti Malam (1977)
- Vue parallèle (1977)
- Les Dames aux vaches (1978)
- Vent d'Est (1979)
- Dernière paille, deuxième version (1980)
- Monumental Woman (1980)
- Pentagramme (1980)
- Dix minutes (1980)
- Refrains : An Opera (1981)
- Huit minutes (1982)
- Calliope (1982)
- Official version : Red (1982)
- Rodolphe (1983)
- Joe (1983)
- Stella (1985)
- Nuit (1986)
- L'événement AUTOROUTE 86 (1986)
- Eldorado (1987)
- Eva Naissance (1987)
- Les Lieux-dits (1988)
- Piazza (1988)
- Orénoque (1990)
- Flykt (1991)
- îles (1991)
- La Vita (1993)
- Adieux (1993)
- L'instinct (1994)
- Les années de pèlerinage (1996)
- Les Ombres dans ta tête (1996)
- Eironos (1996)
- Les Éphémères (1997)
- L'EXIL-L'OUBLI (1999)
- E.M.F. (1999)
- The Comforts of Solitude (2001)
- Les ombres (2001)
- Les petites sociétés (2004)
