= Memory for Max, Claire, Ida and Company =

- Directed by: Allan King
- Produced by: Allan King
- Cinematography: Peter Walker
- Edited by: Nick Hector
- Music by: Robert Carli
- Production company: Allan King Associates
- Release date: September 13, 2005 (TIFF)
- Running time: 112 minutes
- Country: Canada
- Language: English

Memory for Max, Claire, Ida and Company is a Canadian documentary film, directed by Allan King and released in 2005. The film profiles a group of residents at Baycrest Health Sciences, a long term care facility in Toronto, who are suffering from varying stages of dementia.

The film premiered at the 2005 Toronto International Film Festival, and was broadcast on television by TVOntario as an episode of the documentary series The View from Here in February 2006. Its first DVD release featured a commentary track recorded by social workers and psychologists, to facilitate the film's use as a teaching tool for health care providers.

The film was named to TIFF's annual year-end Canada's Top Ten list for 2005, and was shortlisted for the Donald Brittain Award for Best Social or Political Documentary, Best Documentary Editing, and Best Documentary Sound at the 21st Gemini Awards in 2006.
