= Grown Up Movie Star =

- Directed by: Adriana Maggs
- Written by: Adriana Maggs
- Produced by: Shawn Doyle; Jill Knox Gosse; Adriana Maggs; Paul Pope
- Starring: Shawn Doyle; Tatiana Maslany; Jonny Harris; Julia Kennedy
- Cinematography: Jason Tan
- Edited by: Stephen Philipson
- Distributed by: Mongrel Media
- Release date: 29 January 2010
- Running time: 92 minutes
- Country: Canada
- Language: English

Grown Up Movie Star is a 2010 Canadian drama film written, directed and co-produced by Adriana Maggs. Shawn Doyle, Jill Knox Gosse and Paul Pope are the other co-producers. The film was produced by Pope Productions and distributed in Canada by Mongrel Media.

== Plot ==
Ray is a former ice hockey player who is convicted of drug charges for smuggling drugs following his first game in the NHL. After he comes back to his Newfoundland home, his wife Lillian leaves to seek fame in Hollywood with another man. Ray is left with his daughters, high schooler Ruby and her 11-year-old sister Rose. Ray pursues a homosexual relationship with gym teacher James, while avoiding the advances of Jennifer. After Ruby catches her father with James, she explores her sexuality with newly arrived American student Will, her best friend Laura, and Ray's best friend Stuart. Stuart is a paraplegic, shot in a hunting accident by Ray (causing Ray to import the drugs to help Stuart make money). The drama examines the dynamic of the strained and uncertain relationships of all parties.

== Cast ==
- Shawn Doyle as Ray Fry
- Tatiana Maslany as Ruby Fry
- Jonny Harris as Stuart Walsh
- Julia Kennedy as Rose Fry
- Mark O'Brien as Will
- Steve Cochrane as James
- Andy Jones as Bill
- Sherry White as Lillian
- Susan Kent as Jennifer
- Mary Walsh as Receptionist

== Production ==
The film was produced by St. John's based Pope Productions. Filming was conducted in Newfoundland at Flatrock and St. John's. The cast included every member of comedy team Dance Party of Newfoundland.

The soundtrack was written by Elliott Brood. The province of Newfoundland provided over CA$390,000 in funding support. Telefilm Canada provided another $440,000 in funding. The Harold Greenberg Fund and the Canadian Film or Video Tax Credit provided additional budgetary support.

== Release ==
The film was shown at the Sundance Film Festival in January 2010 and at the festival it won the World Cinema Special Jury Prize for Acting. It was released to general audiences in Canada on 29 January 2010.

== See also ==
- List of LGBT films directed by women
