= Perreault Dancer =

2005 Canadian documentary film

- French: Danser Perreault
- Directed by: Tim Southam
- Written by: Andrée Martin
- Produced by: Ian Boyd
- Cinematography: Nathalie Moliavko-Visotzky
- Edited by: Jean-Pierre Cereghetti; Heidi Haines
- Music by: Bertrand Chénier
- Production company: Les Films de l'Isle
- Distributed by: Filmoption International
- Release date: March 13, 2005 (IFFA)
- Running time: 52 minutes
- Country: Canada
- Languages: English; French

Perreault Dancer (French: Danser Perreault) is a Canadian documentary film, directed by Tim Southam and released in 2005. The film profiles the life and career of influential Canadian choreographer Jean-Pierre Perreault.

The film premiered in March 2005 at the Montreal International Festival of Films on Art, before being broadcast on television by Télé-Québec in French, and on Bravo in English.

== Awards ==
Award	Date of ceremony	Category	Recipient(s)	Result	Ref.
Gemini Awards	2006	Best Performing Arts Program or Series, or Arts Documentary Program or Series	Ian Boyd	Nominated	
Gemini Awards	2006	Best Direction in a Performing Arts Program or Series	Tim Southam	Won	
Gemini Awards	2006	Best Original Music Score for a Documentary Program or Series	Bertrand Chénier	Won	
Jutra Awards	2006	Best Documentary Film	Tim Southam, Ian Boyd	Nominated	
Montreal International Festival of Films on Art	2005	Best Canadian Work	Tim Southam	Won	
