= Lewis Hine =

American sociologist and photographer (1874–1940)

Lewis Wickes Hine
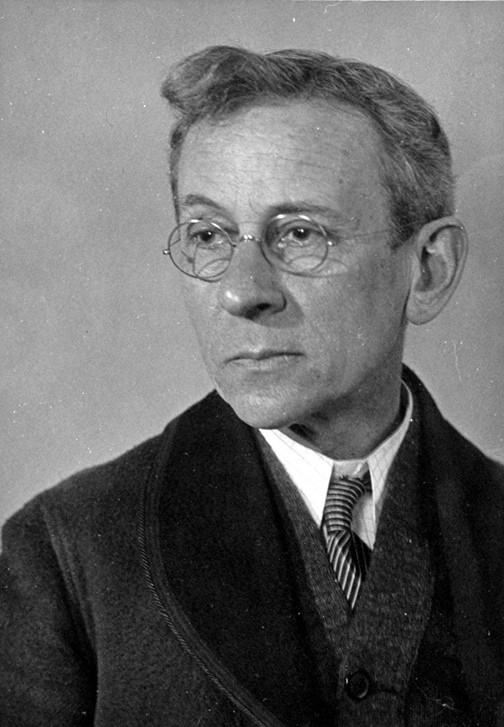
- Hine in c. 1930
- Born: Lewis Wickes Hine; September 26, 1874; Oshkosh, Wisconsin, U.S.
- Died: November 3, 1940 (aged 66); Dobbs Ferry, New York, U.S.
- Education: University of Chicago; Columbia University; New York University
- Known for: Social reform
- Movement: Documentary; social realism
- Patrons: Russell Sage Foundation; National Child Labor Committee; Works Projects Administration

Lewis Wickes Hine (September 26, 1874 – November 3, 1940) was an American sociologist and muckraker photographer. His photographs taken during times such as the Progressive Era and the Great Depression captured young children working in harsh conditions and helped pass the first child labor laws in the United States.

== Early life ==
Hine was born in Oshkosh, Wisconsin, on September 26, 1874. Following the accidental death of his father, the teenage Hine was forced to undertake a number of jobs to support his widowed mother and sisters. Aspiring to become an educator like his mother, Hine saved a portion of his earnings as the family breadwinner to pay for schooling at the University of Chicago, where he enrolled in 1900. While a student in Chicago, Hine met Frank Manny, a professor of education at the Normal School who was named superintendent of the Ethical Culture School in New York City in 1901. At Manny's invitation, Hine accepted a position as an assistant teacher and relocated to New York. There, he encouraged his students to use photography as an educational medium. Hine also studied sociology at Columbia University and New York University.

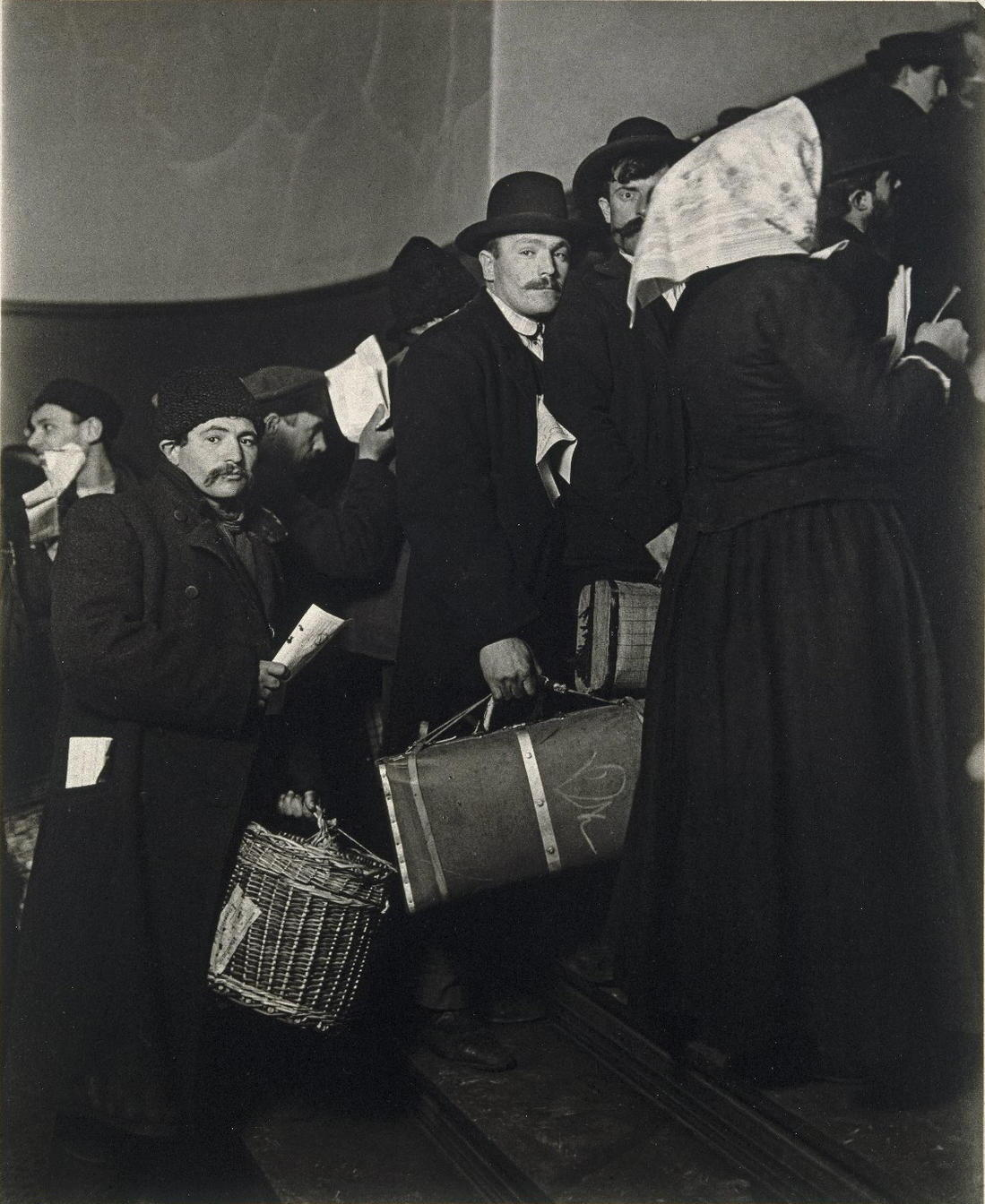
Brooklyn Museum – Climbing into the Promised Land Ellis Island

Hine led his sociology classes to Ellis Island in New York Harbor and photographed the thousands of immigrants who arrived each day. Between 1904 and 1909, Hine took over 200 plates (photographs) and realized documentary photography could be a tool for social change and reform.

== Documentary photography ==
In 1907, Hine became the staff photographer of the Russell Sage Foundation; he photographed life in the steel-making districts and people of Pittsburgh, Pennsylvania, for the influential sociological study called The Pittsburgh Survey.

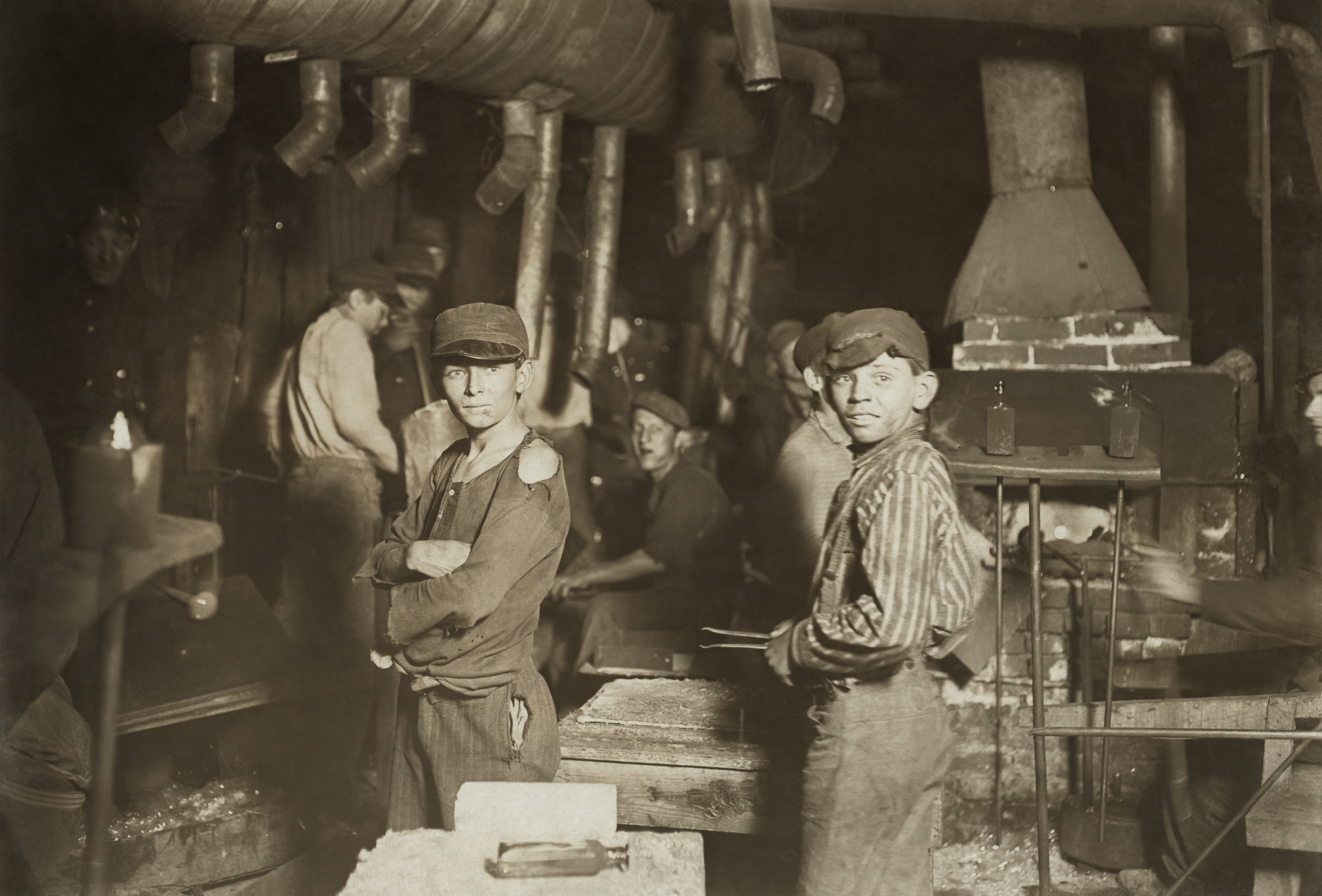
Child laborers in glasswork. Indiana, 1908

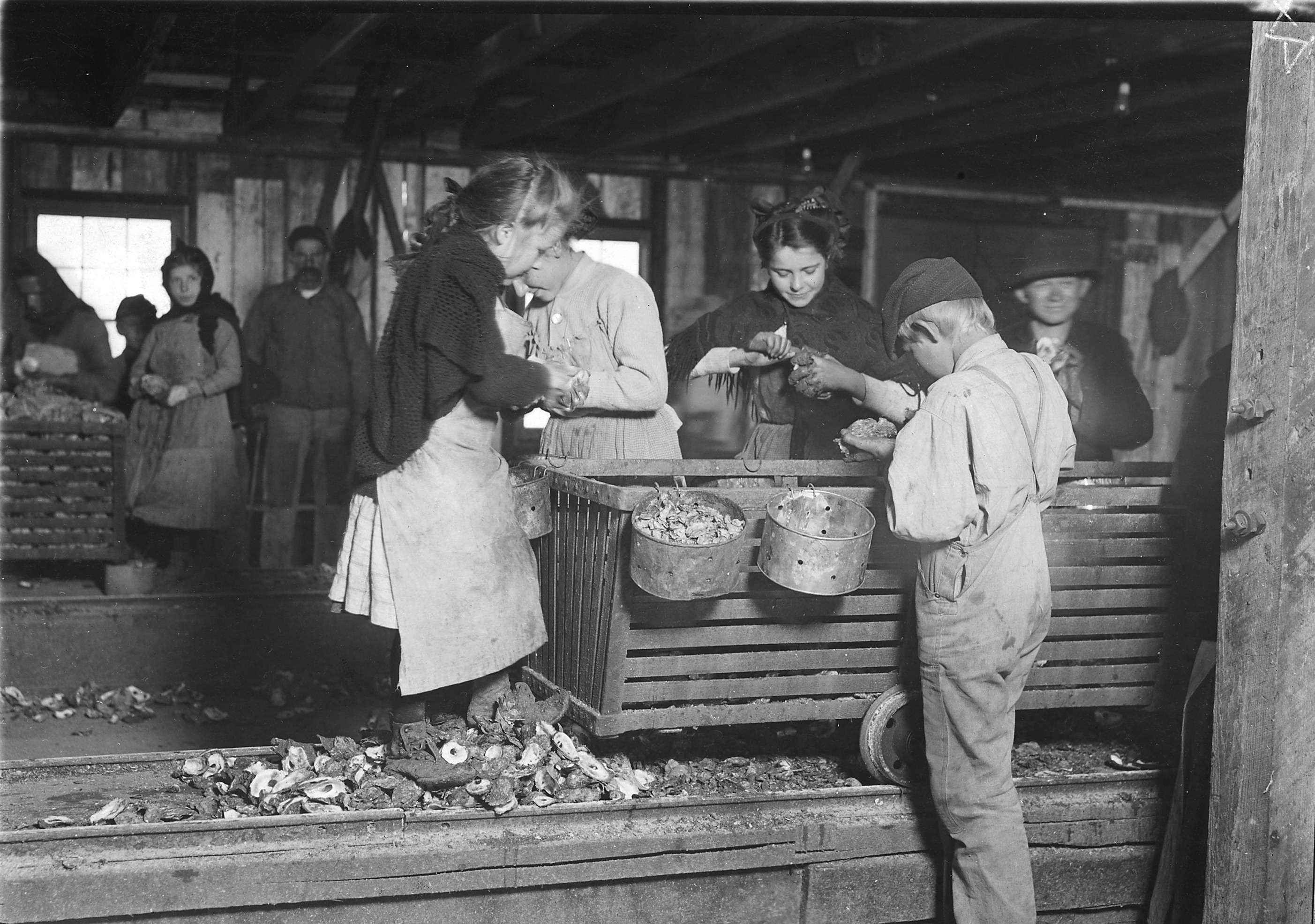
Little Lottie, a regular oyster shucker in Alabama Canning Co. (Bayou La Batre, Alabama, 1911)

In 1908, Hine left his teaching position to become the photographer for the National Child Labor Committee (NCLC). Over the next decade, Hine documented child labor, with a focus on the use of child labor in the Carolina Piedmont, to aid the NCLC's lobbying efforts to end the practice. In 1913, he documented child laborers among cotton mill workers with a series of Francis Galton's composite portraits.

Hine's work for the NCLC was often dangerous. As a photographer, he was frequently threatened with violence or even death by factory police and foremen. At the time, the immorality of child labor was meant to be hidden from the public. Photography was not only prohibited but also posed a serious threat to the industry. To gain entry to the mills, mines and factories, Hine was forced to assume many guises. At times he was a fire inspector, postcard vendor, Bible salesman, or even an industrial photographer recording factory machinery.

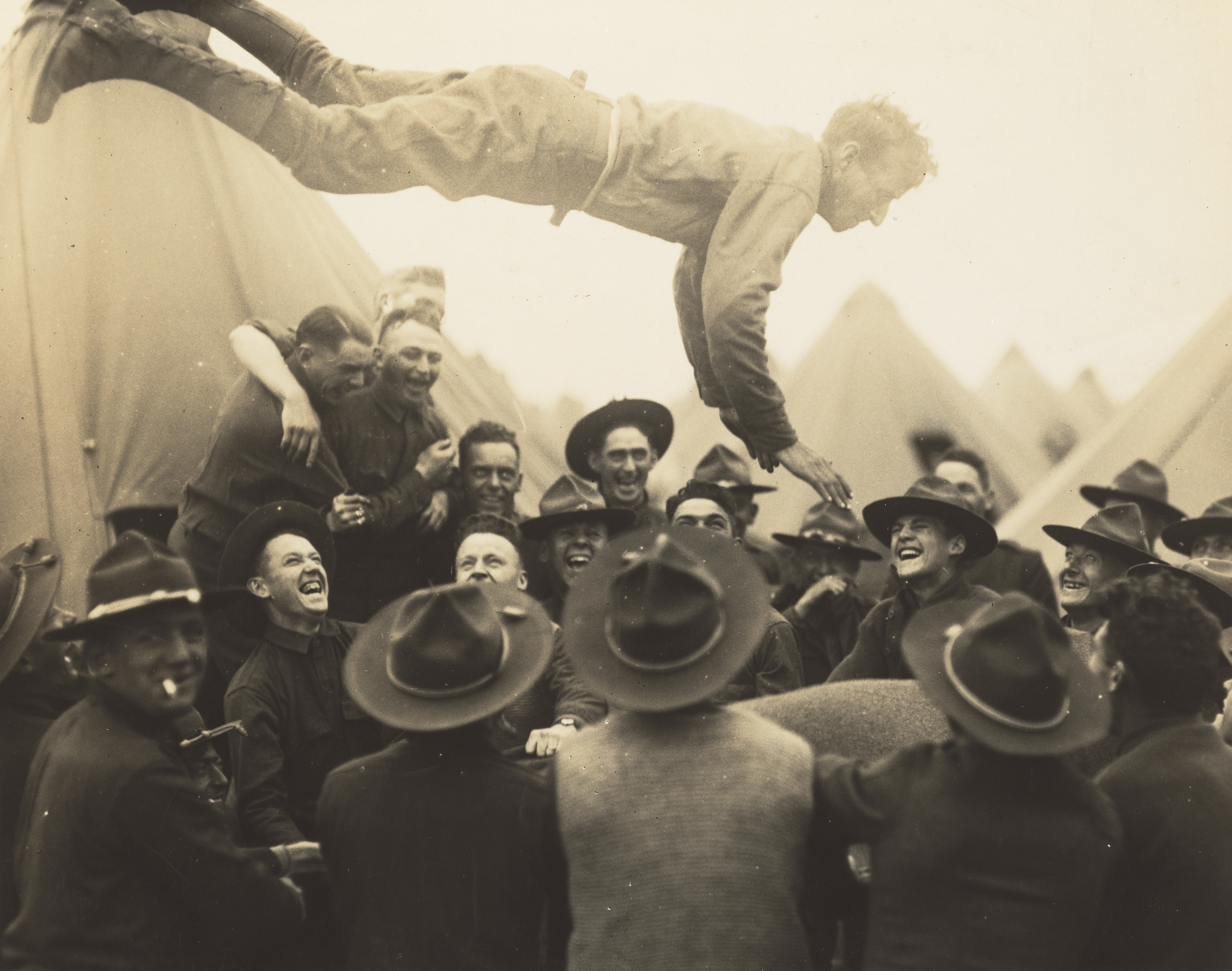
Soldier Thrown in Air, 1917, National Gallery of Art

During and after World War I, he photographed American Red Cross relief work in Europe. In the 1920s and early 1930s, Hine made a series of "work portraits" that emphasized human contribution to modern industry. In 1930, Hine was commissioned to document the construction of the Empire State Building. He photographed workers in precarious positions as they secured the structure's steel framework, taking many of the same risks they endured. To obtain the best vantage points, Hine was swung out in a specially designed basket 1,000 ft above Fifth Avenue. At times, he remembered, he hung above the city with nothing below but "a sheer drop of nearly a quarter-mile."

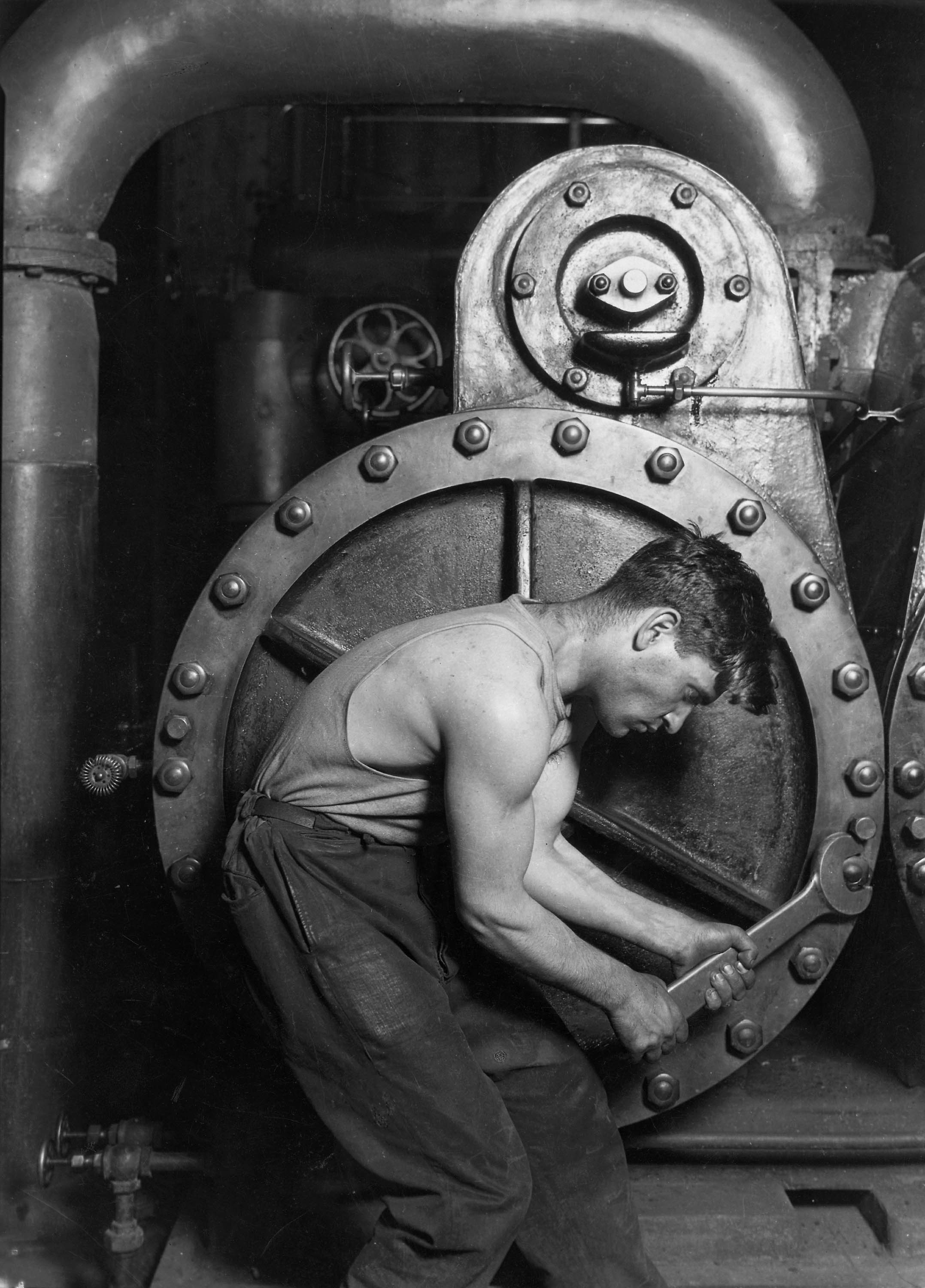
"Power house mechanic working on steam pump" (1920)

During the Great Depression, Hine, once again, worked for the Red Cross, photographing drought relief in the American South, and for the Tennessee Valley Authority (TVA), documenting life in the mountains of eastern Tennessee.

== Later life ==
In 1936, Hine was selected as chief photographer for the Works Progress Administration's National Research Project, which studied changes in industry and their effects on employment, but he did not complete his work there. He was also a faculty member of the Ethical Culture Fieldston School.

In his final years, professional struggles followed the loss of government and corporate patronage. Hine hoped to join the Farm Security Administration photography project, but despite writing repeatedly to Roy Stryker, Stryker always refused. Few people were interested in his work, past or present, and Hine lost his house and applied for welfare. He died on November 3, 1940, at Dobbs Ferry Hospital in Dobbs Ferry, New York, after an operation. He was 66 years old.

== Legacy ==
Hine's photographs supported the NCLC's lobbying to end child labor, and in 1912 the Children's Bureau was created. The Fair Labor Standards Act of 1938 eventually brought child labor in the US to an end.

After Hine's death, his son Corydon donated his prints and negatives to the Photo League, which was dismantled in 1951. The Museum of Modern Art was offered his pictures and did not accept them, but the George Eastman Museum did.

In 1984, PBS produced a one-hour documentary, America and Lewis Hine, about Hine's life and work. The film was directed by Nina Rosenblum, written by Dan Allentuck and narrated by Jason Robards, Maureen Stapleton, and John Crowley.

In 2006, author Elizabeth Winthrop Alsop's historical fiction middle-grade novel Counting on Grace was published by Wendy Lamb Books. The latter chapters center on 12-year-old Grace and her life-changing encounter with Hine, during his 1910 visit to a Vermont cotton mill known to have many child laborers. On the cover is the iconic photo of Grace's real-life counterpart, Addie Card (1897–1993), taken during Hine's undercover visit to the Pownal Cotton Mill.

In 2016, Time published altered (colorized) versions of several of Hine's original photographs of child labor in the US.

== Collections ==
Hine's work is held in the following public collections:

- Art Institute of Chicago, Chicago, Illinois
- Albin O. Kuhn Library & Gallery of the University of Maryland, Baltimore County – almost five thousand NCLC photographs
- George Eastman Museum – thousands of photographs and negatives
- Library of Congress – over 5,000 photographs, including examples of Hine's child labor and Red Cross photographs, his work portraits, and his WPA and TVA images.
- New York Public Library, New York
- International Photography Hall of Fame, St. Louis, Missouri

== Notable photographs ==
- Young Doffers in the Elk Cotton Mills (1910)
- Newsies at Skeeter's Branch (1910)
- Steam Fitter (1920)

== Gallery ==
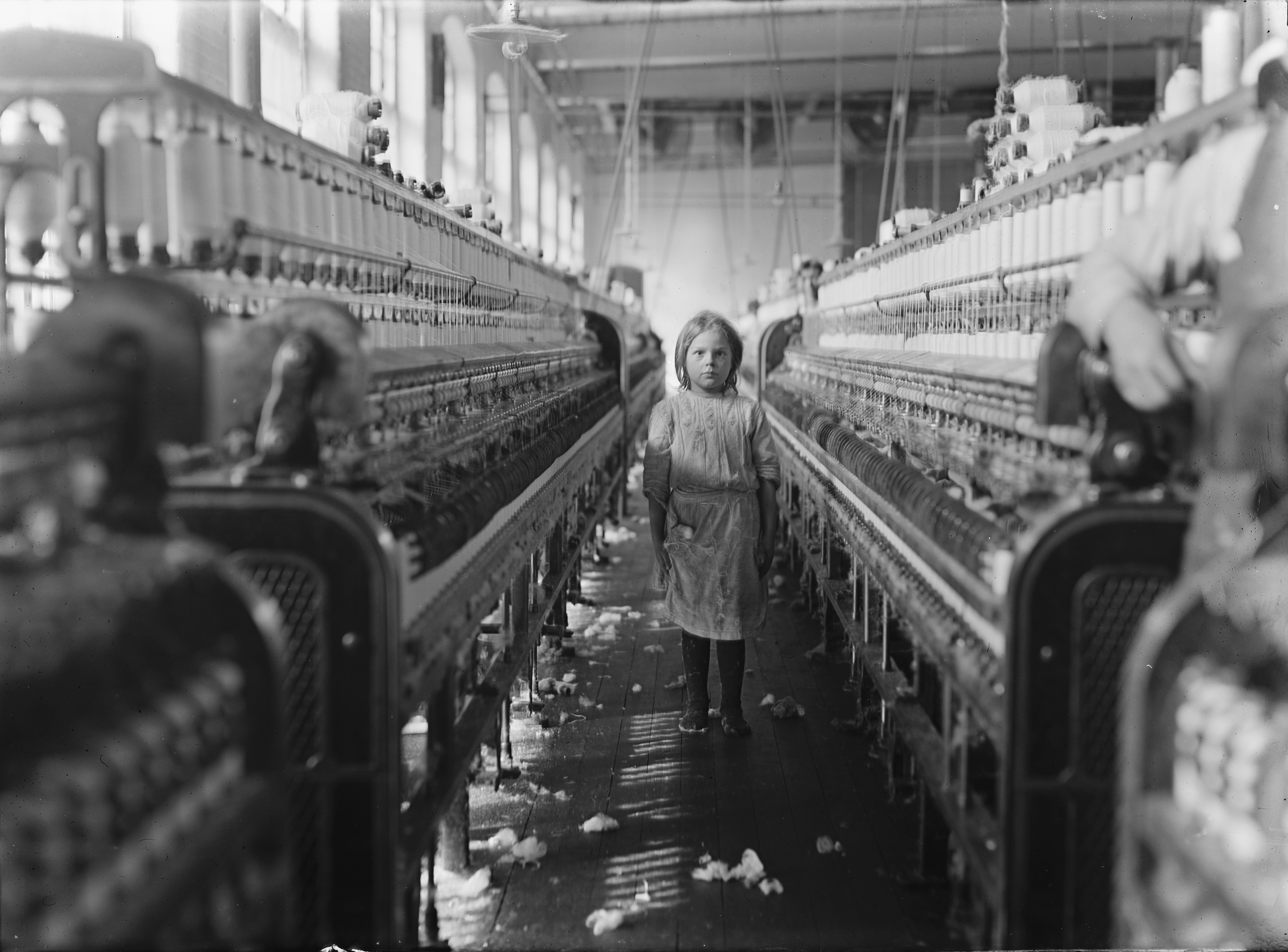
A Little Spinner, Mollohan Mills, S.C. (1908)

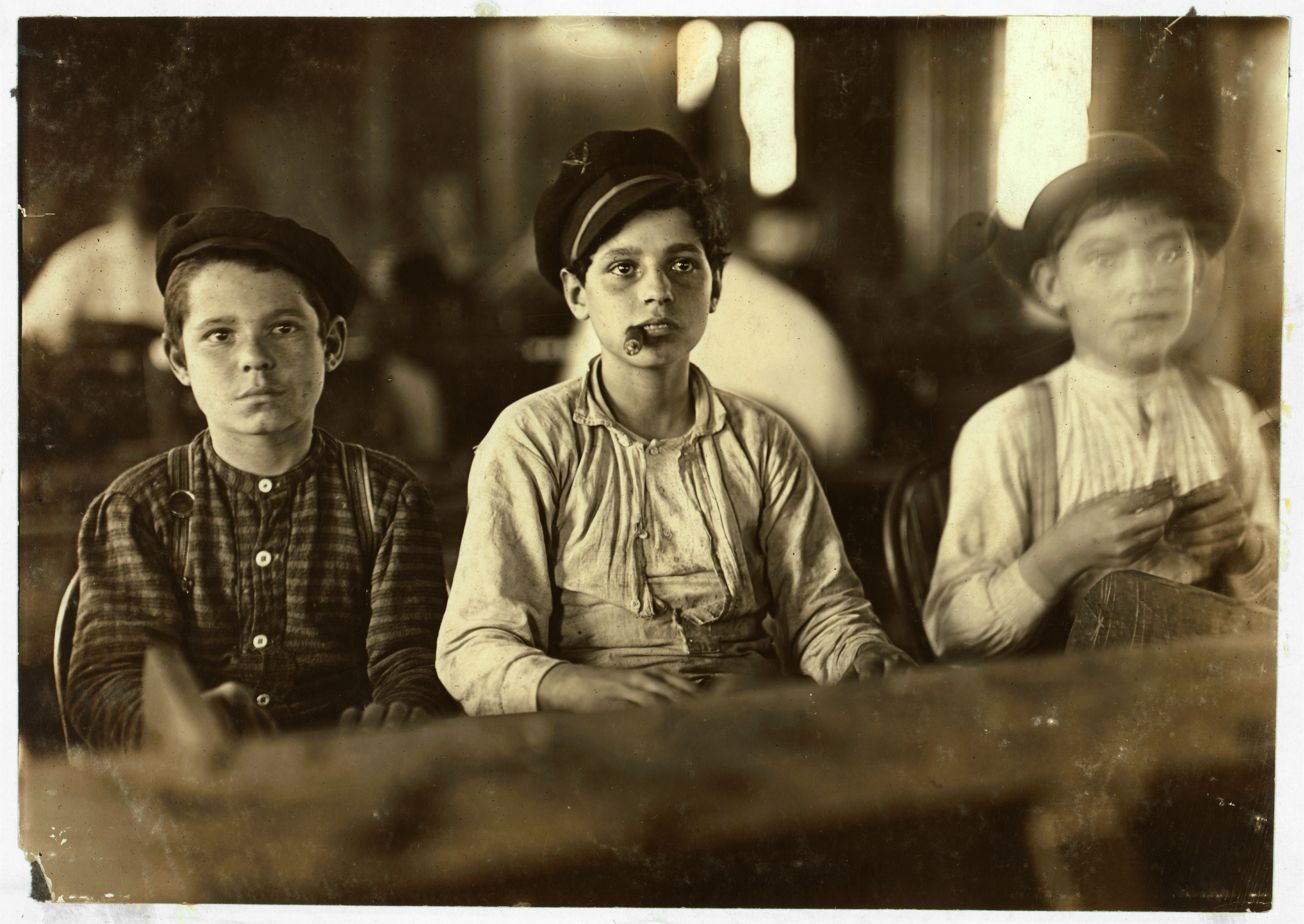
A trio of young cigarmakers. Florida (1909)

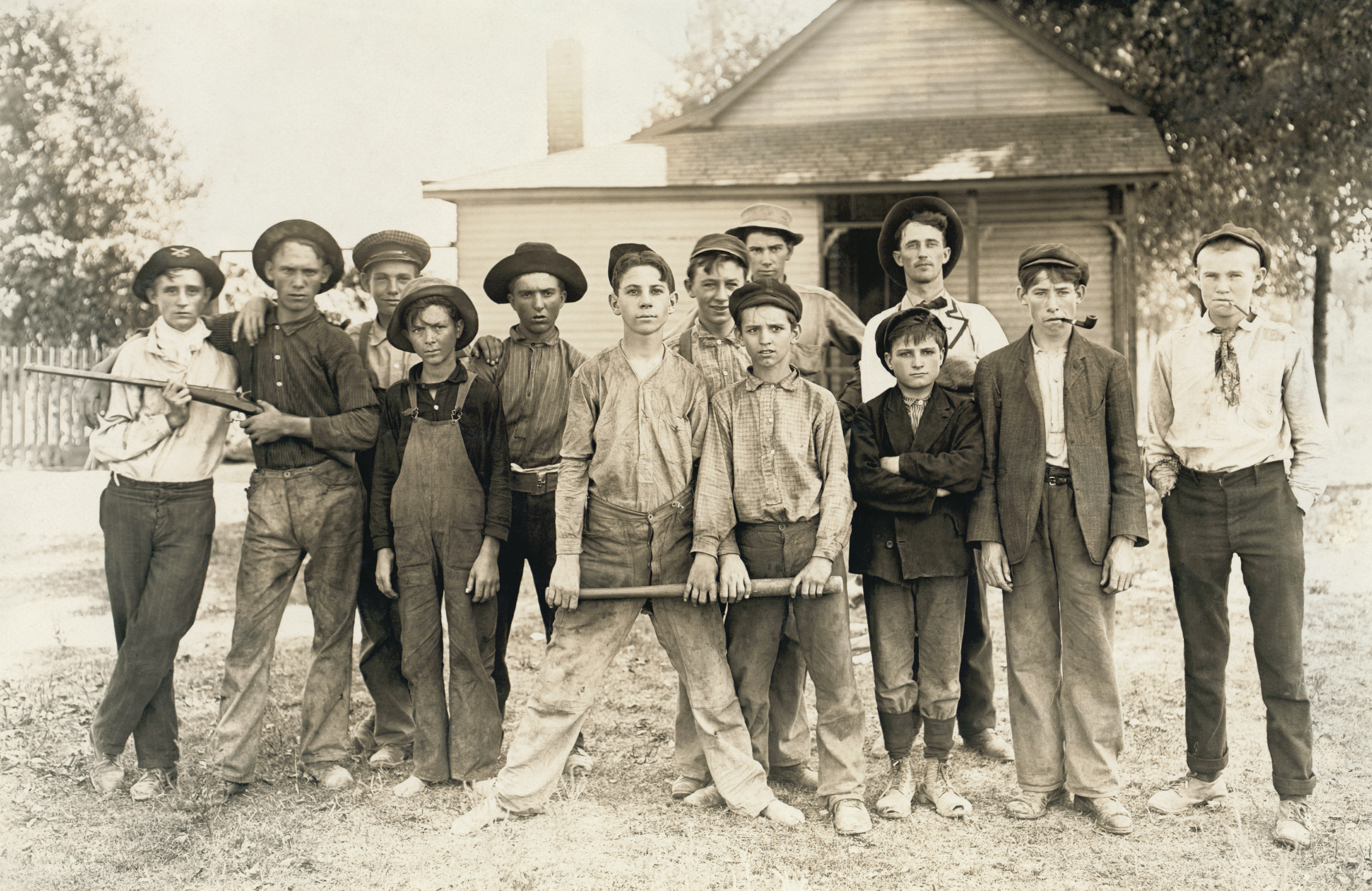
Baseball team composed mostly of child laborers from a glassmaking factory. Indiana (1908)

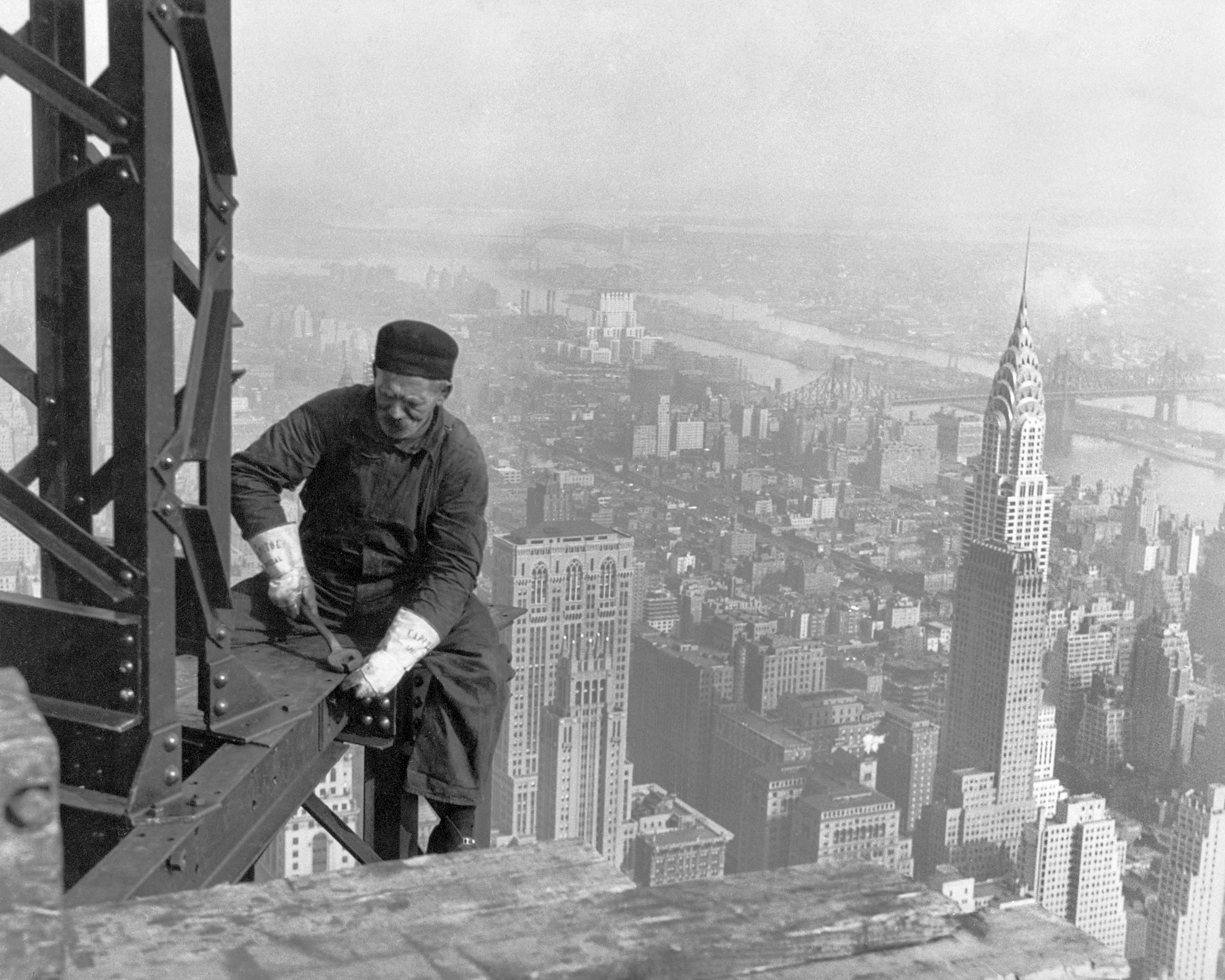
Empire State Building worker in 1931

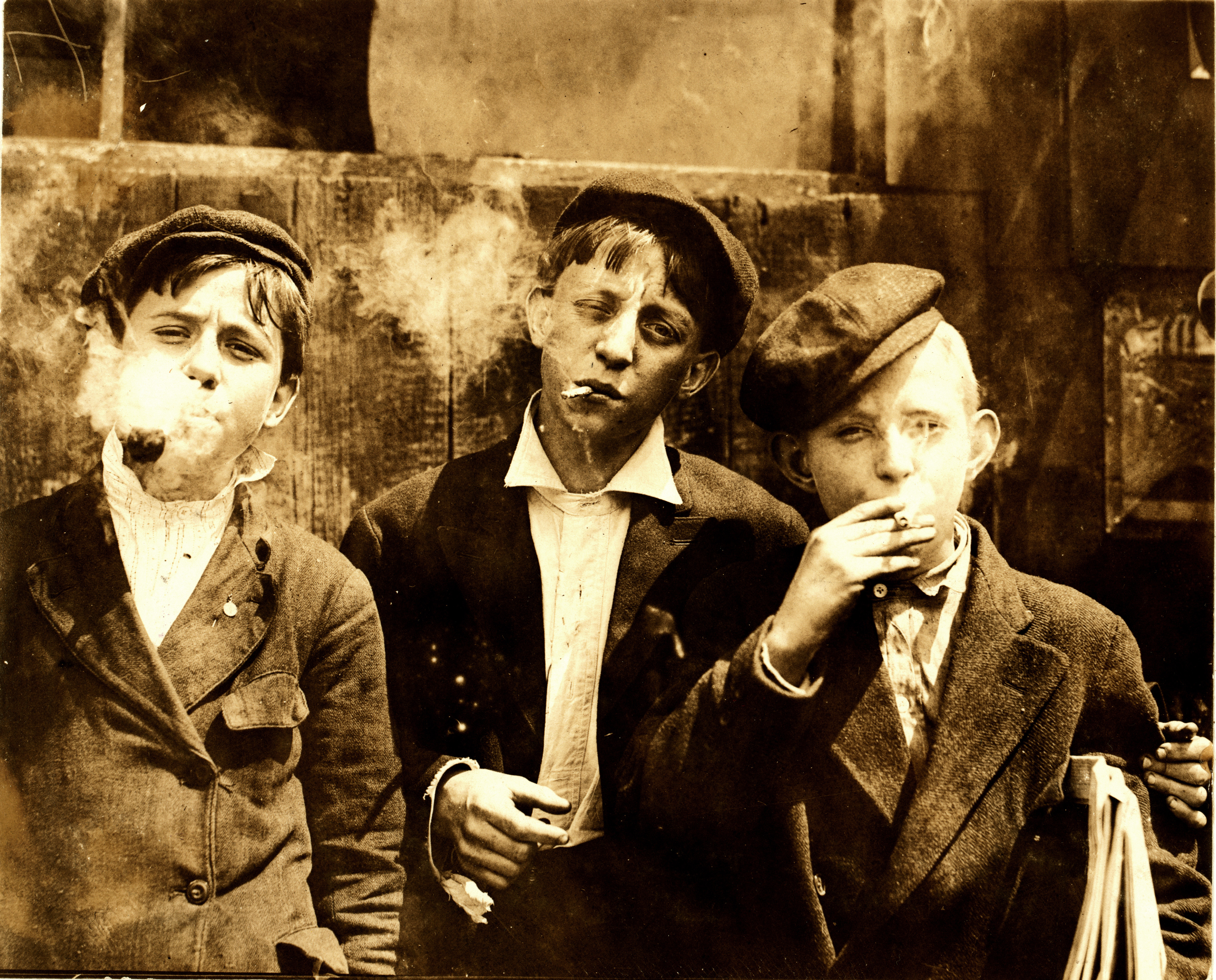
Newsboys smoking. Skeeter's Branch, St. Louis (1910)

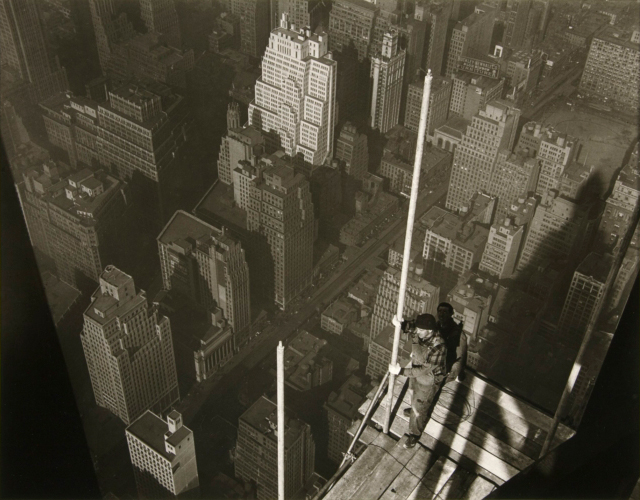
Raising the Mast, Empire State Building (1932)

== See also ==
- House Calls (2006 film), a documentary about physician and photographer Mark Nowaczynski, who was inspired by Hine to photograph elderly patients.
