= Jimmy MacDonald's Canada =

Jimmy MacDonald's Canada: The Lost Episodes is an eight-episode Canadian television series that aired on CBC Television in the summer of 2005.

The show is a mockumentary, set partially to real news clips from the CBC News archives, purporting to be a lost Canadian public affairs series of the mid-1960s hosted by the fictional Jimmy MacDonald (Richard Waugh) with additional commentary from a woman's point of view by Marg Margison (Teresa Pavlinek). The premise is that MacDonald had a breakdown while on the air and fled to northern Canada, taking all of the filmed episodes with him. His plane crashed and he was presumed dead, and the premise is these films have recently been found.

The character of Jimmy MacDonald was created as a combination of several real-life Canadian television figures of the 1960s, including Norman DePoe, Larry Henderson and J. Frank Willis.

== Format ==
The humour of the show is derived from the differences in social values between the 1960s and today. This humour also extends to now-taboo, then-common cigarette advertisements being included in the show, and even the opening credits, which lampoon the similar style of manic, partially animated credits that were common in the era.

Incorporating scripted retrospective commentary from actual public figures (including then-current Prime Minister Paul Martin and the then-current Governor General), the series never breaks character. In his series, ultra-conservative MacDonald rails against various innovations and the rise of youth culture. Although fictional in nature, the series incorporates actual news and human interest footage from the CBC archives.

Commentaries were provided by:

- Then-current Governor General of Canada Adrienne Clarkson
- Then-current Prime Minister of Canada Paul Martin
- former Prime Minister (1979–80) Joe Clark
- CTV news anchor Lloyd Robertson (who is also featured in one of the archival clips featured in the series as he used to work for the CBC)
- journalist, TV personality and historian Pierre Berton, known for his work on the CBC's Front Page Challenge (who died before the show was broadcast)
- Paul Henderson, an iconic hockey player from the 1970s known for his winning goal in the 1972 Summit Series
- Don Cherry, hockey commentator (Hockey Night in Canada)
- former senator and TV personality (Front Page Challenge) Betty Kennedy
- historian and author Charlotte Gray
- TV personality Jeanne Beker
- former Prime Minister of Canada (1963-1968) Lester B. Pearson, shown in stock footage from the 1960s, apparently eulogizing MacDonald.
- Although neither appears on screen, frequent mentions are also made of the CBC comedy duo Wayne and Shuster and their images appear in the opening credits of each episode.

MacDonald begins each episode by saying: "I'm Jimmy MacDonald, and I'm going to give it to you straight!"

MacDonald provides commentary on trends in Canadian society from a reactionary viewpoint, opposing such "fads" as physical fitness, rock music and fashion, from the point of view of an ultra-conservative with Victorian sensibilities.

Margison hosts a segment called "A Woman's Advice", providing advice on social issues based on personal experiences. "Let's build a great Canada!" she encourages viewers at the end of each segment. Running jokes related to this segment include Margison's expressions of veiled contempt towards her husband, and MacDonald's own attraction to her (at one point he is caught on camera asking for her phone number).

All but the first and final episodes have a section called Outrage of the Week where Jimmy presents three news clips related to the week's topic and then picks the one that outrages him the most.

MacDonald regularly promotes the show's (fictional) sponsor, "Provincial Brand" cigarettes, a parody of commercial advertisements common on television in the 1960s.

Several episodes include MacDonald conducting interviews with people in archival footage, most notably iconic broadcaster Foster Hewitt. A running joke with this segment is, since the original interviews were done with someone else, MacDonald is always having to correct his interviewees when they get his name wrong.

MacDonald's "collapse" is given a slow buildup throughout the series as the ultra-conservative, traditionalist host becomes increasingly more frustrated with the modern innovations he's forced to cover (this is often played to comic effect, such as when he rails against the advent of the zamboni during one of his "Outrage of the Week" segments), but accelerates when he loses his temper on the penultimate episode dealing with the hippie movement—he is particularly frustrated with (vintage) news footage of a group of young people draping themselves over the statue of Queen Victoria in Queen's Park in Toronto. The final episode of the show, about the sexual revolution, is the one in which MacDonald suffers his breakdown on the air because of his outrage over how the show was turning out with what he believed was taboo material. He finally snaps after viewing a segment on elderly nudists and has to be physically restrained after he lunges at the cameraman while Marg looks on in horror.

== Time frame ==
The series never specifically identifies the year in which it is supposed to take place. This allows it to cover topics from the course of several years, ranging from the Twist craze of circa 1962, up to the Summer of Love of 1967, although the lack of references to Canada's Centennial that year suggest the series itself is not meant to be seen as taking place in 1967. On the other hand, a segment refers to Pierre Trudeau being the new justice minister, which happened in 1967.

The final episode of the series is set in 1966. After MacDonald storms off the set, on-screen titles indicate that "MacDonald died 72 hours later," followed by "Jimmy MacDonald, 1921-1966." The time frame of the other episodes is not given; the previous episodes of the series are not assumed to be set in consecutive weeks, though there is progression with relation to MacDonald's deteriorating state of mind, his relationship with Marg, and his physical reaction to smoking the sponsor's brand of cigarettes.

== Response ==
Waugh received a Gemini Award nomination for Best Individual Performance in a Comedy Program or Series at the 21st Gemini Awards.
