= Jerri Nielsen =

American ER physician (1952–2009)

Jerri Lin Nielsen
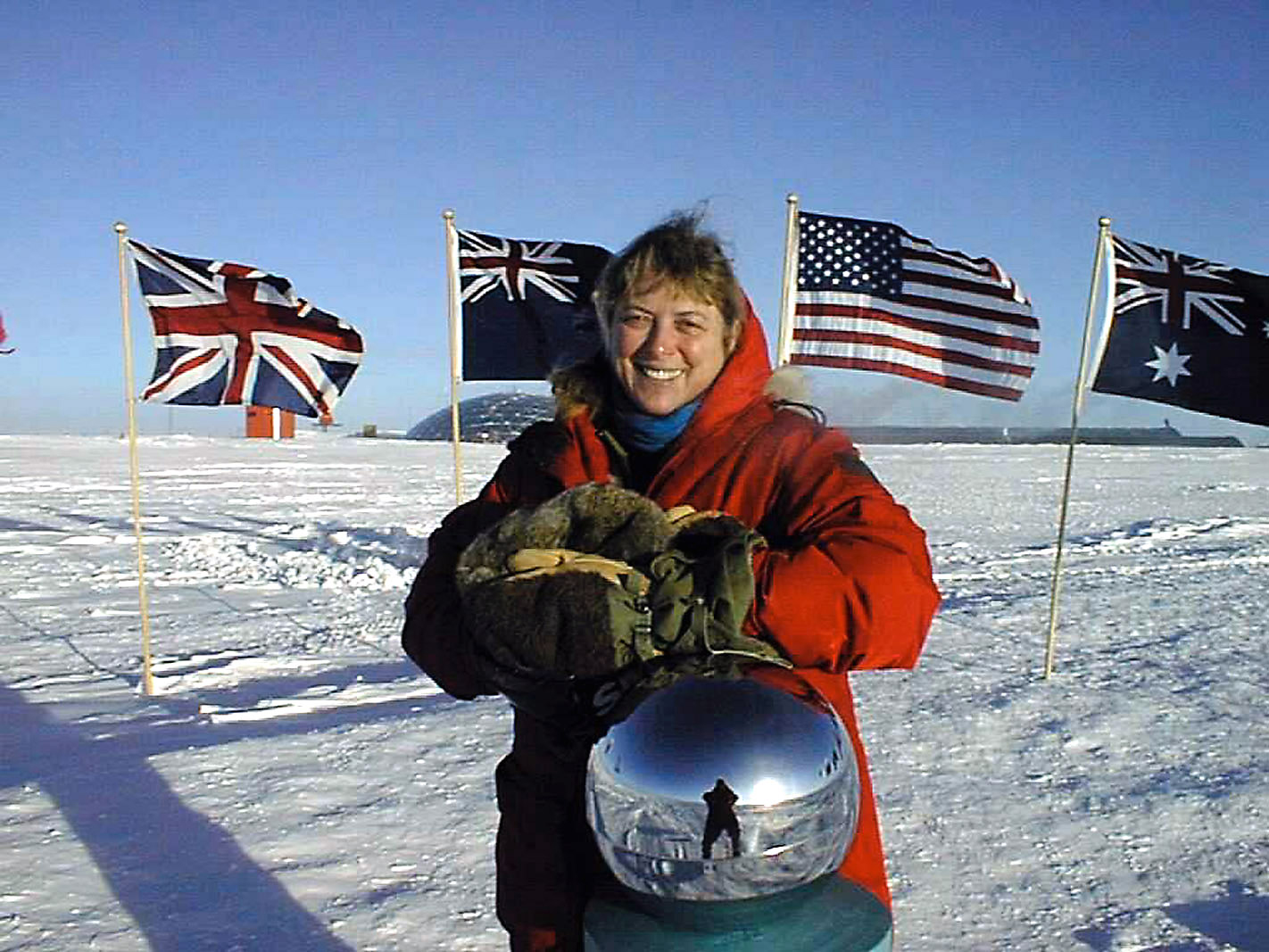
- Nielsen in 1999
- Born: Jerri Lin Cahill; March 1, 1952; Salem, Ohio, United States
- Died: June 23, 2009 (aged 57); Southwick, Massachusetts, United States
- Education: Ohio University; Medical College of Ohio
- Occupation: Physician
- Known for: Physician who self-administered a biopsy, and later chemotherapy, after discovering a breast tumor while in Antarctica, until she could be evacuated

Jerri Lin Nielsen (née Cahill; March 1, 1952 – June 23, 2009) was an American physician with extensive emergency room experience, who self-treated her breast cancer while stationed at Amundsen–Scott South Pole Station in Antarctica until she could be safely evacuated.

In 1998 during the southern winter, when the station is physically isolated from the rest of the world, she developed breast cancer. Nielsen teleconferenced with medical personnel in the United States and had to operate on herself to extract tissue samples for analysis. A military plane was dispatched to the pole to airdrop equipment and medications. Her condition remained life-threatening, and the first plane to land at the station in the October spring was sent weeks earlier than scheduled, despite adverse weather conditions, to take her to the U.S. as soon as possible. Her ordeal attracted great attention from the media, and Nielsen later wrote an autobiography recounting her story.

The cancer went into remission, but recurred seven years later, eventually causing her death in 2009 from metastatic brain disease, eleven years after initial diagnosis.

== Early life and education ==
Born as Jerri Lin Cahill in Salem, Ohio on March 1, 1952, 25 miles from Youngstown, Ohio, Nielsen was the oldest child and only daughter of Philip and Lorine Cahill, who raised their family in a rural area just outside Salem. She studied pre-med at Ohio University in Athens before entering the Medical College of Ohio in Toledo and graduating with a medical degree.

While at Ohio University she also met Jay Nielsen, whom she subsequently married. They had three children before divorcing in 1998. She continued to work as a physician, mostly as an ER surgeon.

== Antarctic stay ==
In 1998, Nielsen was hired on a one-year contract as the medical doctor at the Amundsen-Scott South Pole Station in Antarctica. This isolated region experiences almost total darkness for the six months of winter, during which the temperature is around −60 °C (−76 °F). The station is then completely cut off from the world, with no flights there between mid-February and late October. The "winterover" crew is stranded and entirely autonomous.

In the course of her work at the research station, Nielsen discovered a lump in her breast. After consulting US physicians via e-mail and video conference, she performed a biopsy upon herself. The results were, however, inconclusive, because the outdated supplies on site did not allow a precise diagnosis.

The National Science Foundation decided to send a military plane to airdrop supplies and medication for her treatment. Such airdrops had been an annual event years earlier when the station was run by the US Navy, but had later been halted. The plane could not land because its skis risked sticking to the ice and its fuel and hydraulic lines would rapidly freeze, dooming the craft. South Pole workers lit fires in barrels in the Antarctic night to mark out a drop zone. An Air Force C-141 cargo plane staged out of Christchurch, overflew the Pole in darkness and dropped six bundles of supplies and medical equipment via parachutes to the station on July 11.

Using the dropped supplies, Nielsen began treatment following the advice of her doctors over the satellite link. She began with a hormone treatment. She trained her South Pole colleagues as a small team to assist her in the procedures. A new biopsy performed with the airdropped equipment allowed better scans to be sent to the US, where it was confirmed that the cells were cancerous. With the help of her makeshift medical team, Nielsen then began self-administering chemotherapy.

In October, an LC-130 Hercules was sent several weeks ahead of schedule, despite the risks inherent to flying in such cold weather, to bring Nielsen back home as soon as possible. The plane took off from the base on October 15. Another crew member, who had suffered a hip injury during the winter, was also evacuated.

== After returning to the United States ==
Once back in the United States, after multiple surgeries, complications and a mastectomy, Nielsen went into remission. She became a motivational speaker and a scholarship was created in her honor; she also remarried, to Tom Fitzgerald. In 2001, Nielsen was named Irish American of the Year by Irish America magazine.

== Metastasis ==
After being in remission, the cancer returned in 2005 and metastasized to Nielsen's brain, liver and bones, but she continued to give speeches and traveled extensively including to Hong Kong, Vietnam, Australia, Ireland, Alaska, Poland, and she returned to Antarctica several times. In October 2008, Dr. Nielsen announced that her cancer had returned in the form of a brain tumor. She was active and giving talks until March 2009, three months before her death.

She died at her home in Southwick, Massachusetts on June 23, 2009, at age 57. She was survived by her second husband, Tom Fitzgerald; her parents, Lorine and Phil Cahill; her brothers, Scott Cahill and Eric Cahill; and her children from her previous marriage: Julia, Ben and Alex.

== Media depictions ==
With ghostwriter Maryanne Vollers, Nielsen's story was told in the autobiographical Ice Bound: A Doctor's Incredible Story of Survival at the South Pole, which became a New York Times bestseller. The book was later adapted into Ice Bound: A Woman's Survival at the South Pole, a 2003 CBS-TV movie starring Susan Sarandon, and in 2008 became the inspiration for an episode of Fox Network show House, "Frozen", in which the team must somehow, via teleconference, diagnose and treat a stricken physician at the South Pole. The story of her rescue was featured on The Weather Channel's When Weather Changed History in the "Rescue from the South Pole" in January 2008.

== See also ==
- Leonid Rogozov, a Soviet doctor who had to remove his own appendix while deployed in Antarctica in 1961

== Sources ==
- Nielsen, Jerri; Maryanne Vollers (2001). Ice Bound: A Doctor's Incredible Battle for Survival at the South Pole. New York: Hyperion. ISBN 0-7868-6684-5.
