= Ice Bound: A Woman's Survival at the South Pole =

- DVD cover of Ice Bound: A Woman's Survival at the South Pole
- Based on: Ice Bound: A Doctor's Incredible Battle for Survival at the South Pole by Dr. Jerri Nielsen with Maryanne Vollers
- Screenplay by: Peter Pruce; Maria Nation
- Directed by: Roger Spottiswoode
- Starring: Susan Sarandon; Aidan Devine; Cynthia Mace; Paulino Nunes; Steve Cumyn; Carl Marotte; Lorne Cardinal; Kenneth Welsh; Linlyn Lue; Richard Waugh; Kathryn Zenna; Joe Pingue; Kristen Holden-Ried; Gina Clayton; Aaron Abrams; Benz Antoine
- Narrated by: Susan Sarandon
- Theme music composer: Jeff Danna
- Country of origin: United States
- Original language: English

Production
- Producer: Clara George
- Editor: Dominique Fortin
- Running time: 89 minutes

Original release
- Network: CBS
- Release: April 20, 2003

Ice Bound: A Woman's Survival at the South Pole is a 2003 made-for-television film starring Susan Sarandon as Dr. Jerri Nielsen in the true story of the cancer-stricken physician stranded at a South Pole research station who, under dangerous circumstances, and with the help of co-workers, treats her own illness.

== Synopsis ==
Based on the New York Times best-selling book Ice Bound: A Doctor's Incredible Battle for Survival at the South Pole, the movie tells the story of how, in 1999, 46-year-old physician Nielsen decides to leave Ohio and spend a year at the Amundsen–Scott South Pole Station on Antarctica, one of the most remote and perilous places on Earth. Conditions at the station will be far from manageable, with winter temperatures as low as 100 degrees below zero. Joining a team of researchers, construction workers and support staff, Dr. Nielsen is solely responsible for the mental and physical health of all fellow inhabitants stranded at the station through the winter. During the long Antarctic winter, Dr. Nielsen discovers a lump in her breast and is forced to self-administer a biopsy. Communicating via e-mail with doctors in the United States, she learns that the cancer is aggressive and rapid-growing. In order for her to survive several months until conditions will allow planes to land and rescue her from the continent, the doctors concur that she will need to begin chemotherapy treatments immediately.

Risking death, rescuers heroically air-drop the necessary supplies to the station and, along with the help of fellow "Polies", including close friends Big John Penny (Aidan Devine) and Claire "Fingers" Furinski (Cynthia Mace), Nielsen begins her debilitating chemotherapy treatments. Eventually, the Air National Guard makes a daring rescue, drops off a replacement physician and returns Nielsen to the United States, where she is able to seek full medical attention to treat her cancer.

== Direction and location ==
Directed by Roger Spottiswoode, Ice Bound: A Woman's Survival at the South Pole was filmed on location near Ontario's frozen Lake Simcoe.

== Nomination ==
2004 Golden Reel Award for Best Sound Editing in Television Long Form—Sound Effects and Foley

- Janice Ierulli (supervising sound editor)
- Jane Tattersall (sound effects editor)
- Mark Shnuriwsky (sound effects editor)
