= Divine Restoration =

Canadian reality television series

Divine Restoration is a Canadian reality television series, which premiered in 2005 on VisionTV and TV One. A variant on the home renovation genre of television programming, the series undertook renovation projects on houses of worship.

Hosted by Jim Codrington and Catherine Burdon, the series taps into the talents of the congregation. Instead of hiring electricians, plumbers, carpenters, architects, etc., DR finds people of relevant professions to donate their time to lead the rest of the parish's members in the work.

The series aims to not discriminate against particular faiths, representing as many denominations as possible. They renovated in locations in both Canada and the United States, including Toronto, Halifax, Winnipeg, Ottawa, Montreal, New York, Montgomery, Orlando, Atlanta, New Orleans, Chicago and Milwaukee.

The series received a Gemini Award nomination for Best Lifestyle Series at the 21st Gemini Awards in 2006.
