= How William Shatner Changed the World =

2005 television documentary

- Also known as: How Techies Changed the World with William Shatner
- Genre: Documentary
- Based on: I'm Working on That by William Shatner (2002)
- Narrated by: William Shatner

Production
- Running time: 120 minutes

Original release
- Network: Discovery Channel Canada
- Release: 13 November 2005
- Network: History Channel (U.S.)
- Network: Channel Five (U.K.)

Related
- Star Trek

How William Shatner Changed the World (or How Techies Changed the World with William Shatner in Europe, Asia, and Australia) is a 2005 two-hour television documentary, commissioned by Discovery Channel Canada and co-produced for History Channel in the United States and Channel Five in the United Kingdom. Hosted and narrated by William Shatner, known for his portrayal of Captain James T. Kirk, and based on his 2002 book, I'm Working on That, the show focuses on technological advancements and people in the real world that were inspired by the Star Trek phenomenon.

== Summary ==
=== First hour ===
The first hour focuses on the original Star Trek series and the ideas that Gene Roddenberry had about the future of space travel.

It begins with the life of Dr. Marc D. Rayman, the chief propulsion engineer at NASA's Jet Propulsion Laboratory, and shows how Dr. Rayman became interested in propulsion through Star Trek. It also discusses how NASA's newest deep space probe's ion propulsion was inspired by the 1968 Star Trek episode "Spock's Brain". Shatner also states that "those pesky trekkies are everywhere in the space program," hence the name for the first Space Shuttle: Enterprise.

The show then examines the life of Martin Cooper, the chief engineer at Motorola, who invented the cell phone. Cooper states that Star Trek was his inspiration for the cell phone, and discusses the similarities between the modern day cell phone and a Star Trek communicator. He also discusses how Star Trek introduced the concept of computer voice recognition dialing.

Next, Mae C. Jemison describes how Star Trek inspired her to become the first African-American woman in space, and Seth Shostak, of SETI (Search for Extra Terrestrial Intelligence), tells how it led him to astronomy.

The show also explores how Star Trek popularized the notion of the user-friendly personal computer, and how Trek fan Ed Roberts, invented the first home computer, the Altair 8800, named after the solar system Altair (Altair 6) in the 1967 Star Trek episode "Amok Time". This led to Bill Gates writing the computer programming language BASIC for the Altair and forming Microsoft.

Medical technologies are discussed, in particular the inspiration for non-invasive Star-Trek-style imaging technology.

Warp drive and faster-than-light interstellar travel with theoretical physicist Miguel Alcubierre's theories are mentioned. Lawrence M. Krauss, physicist and author of the 1995 non-fiction book The Physics of Star Trek, is also featured.

The show then investigates the research work of Kevin Warwick at the University of Reading and considers its links with the Borg. Warwick's cyborg implants, linking his own nervous system into the internet, are featured.

=== Second hour ===
The second hour focuses on further programs in Star Trek franchise: Star Trek: The Next Generation, Star Trek: Deep Space Nine, Star Trek: Voyager and Star Trek: Enterprise and their impact and how they differed from the original series.

Next up is Steve Perlman, at the time principal scientist at Apple Computer, who was inspired to invent the QuickTime media player by watching an episode of Star Trek: The Next Generation.

Filmed mostly in Vancouver, British Columbia, Canada, the special featured some scenes that took place in locations shown in Star Trek TV series.

== Reception ==
The Coast remarked that the documentary is "not particularly well-structured" yet acknowledged that "hammy Shatner brings his A-game, so the movie’s still fun to watch." The Associated Press wrote: "As scientists recount the ideas and inspiration they gained from “Star Trek,” Shatner struts, blusters and soliloquizes about the impact of the show, hamming it up as much as he ever did as the melodramatic Kirk."

== Awards ==
The special was nominated for two Emmy Awards in 2006 - Outstanding Nonfiction Special, and Outstanding Writing For Nonfiction Programming.
