= Black Widow (2005 film) =

- Directed by: David Mortin
- Written by: Patricia Fogliato; David Mortin
- Produced by: Patricia Fogliato; David Mortin
- Starring: Sarah Slean; Martin Tielli; Mary Margaret O'Hara; Tom McCamus; Julian Richings
- Cinematography: Paul Sarossy
- Edited by: David Ostry
- Production companies: Enigmatico Films; Holland Park Productions
- Distributed by: Rhombus International
- Release date: September 29, 2005 (Calgary Film Festival)
- Running time: 50 minutes
- Country: Canada
- Language: English

Black Widow, is a "Film Noir Musical" film written by David Mortin and Patricia Fogliato and directed by the former. It is loosely based on the trial of Evelyn Dick for the murder of her husband. The film stars Martin Tielli, Mary Margaret O'Hara and Sarah Slean as Eve Hardwick, the character that is based on Evelyn Dick.

Director David Mortin stated that he did not want to make the film into a biographical film, as that had already been done (referring to the 2002 crime thriller Torso: The Evelyn Dick Story), but instead, focus on "mythologizing the Evelyn Dick story, shaping it into the form of a 40's era film noir".

The film premiered on September 29, 2005, on the film festival circuit and on CBC Television in January 2006.

== Plot summary ==
The film begins with a severed head that is just about to go up in flames when it starts to sing "Blue Prelude" by Nina Simone. The head then starts to tell the story of how it has wound up in this situation. He meets a beautiful dark-haired woman, a femme fatale, and he begins to fall in love with her the moment their eyes meet. Soon after, he learns that she should not be trusted but by then it is too late as he soon becomes entrapped in the charming predator's web of deception.

== Cast ==
- Martin Tielli as Johnny Hardwick
- Sarah Slean as Eve Hardwick
- Mary Margaret O'Hara as Elizabeth Peyton
- Jan Filips as Mysterious Man
- Dwayne Hill as Bouncer
- Diane Fabian as Organist
- Ian D. Clark as Minister
- Julian Richings as Dr. Deadman
- Tom McCamus as Detective Pressman
- Scott Wickware as Police Officer
- Gary Reineke as Judge
- Simon Reynolds as Crown Prosecutor

== Production ==
Mortin claims that one of the hardest tasks was finding the perfect femme fatale to play Eve Hardwick. In the spring of 2004, he met Sarah Slean and Mortin was "blown away" by her music and her "inherent theatrically". He cast her in hoping that she would be able to portray the black widow. According to Mortin, Sarah seemed very nervous at first on set. In his director's notes, he writes "[Sarah] tried on gown after gown under the lights and seemed to be growing increasingly uncomfortable - which made me feel very nervous as well. Then she tried on what we called the 'Gilda gown' - jet-black and shimmering with a life of its own. Suddenly her character, the period, the whole film noir world of BLACK WIDOW snapped into sharp focus for her. And for me too, because finally, our femme fatale was standing there before us, ready for her close up."

== Awards and nominations ==
| Award | Category | Recipient(s) and nominee(s) | Result |
|---|---|---|---|
| Gemini Awards | Best Performance in a Performing Arts Program or Series | Sarah Slean | Nominated |
| Gemini Awards | Best Photography in a Comedy, Variety or Performing Arts Program or Series | Paul Sarossy | Nominated |
| Gemini Awards | Best Picture Editing in a Comedy, Variety or Performing Arts Program or Series | David Ostry | Nominated |
| Gemini Awards | Best Costume Design | Alex Reda | Nominated |
| Gemini Awards | Best Original Music Score for a Program or Mini-Series | Jonathan Goldsmith | Nominated |
| Gemini Awards | Best Sound in a Comedy, Variety, or Performing Arts Program or Series | John J. Thomson; Steve Hammond; Ronayne Higginson; Kirk Lynds; David McCallum; David Rose; Lou Solakofski | Nominated |
| Golden Prague International Television Festival | Czech Crystal for Music or Dance Programmes made for Television | David Mortin (Producer, Director, Writer); Patricia Fogliato (Producer, Writer); Enigmatico Films (Production Company) | Won |
