= OpenGear Terminal Equipment Platform =

The openGear Terminal Equipment Platform is a modular platform for terminal equipment used for video, audio and data signal processing and distribution in the broadcast and production industries. Ross Video is the creator of the openGear platform and licenses it to other companies who then make openGear compliant signal processing cards. The development and sale of openGear compliant cards is royalty-free.

The openGear frame physical, electrical and protocol standards and specifications are described in “openGear Platform Specifications”, a document that is maintained and updated by Ross Video.

DashBoard is the openGear control and monitoring system which provides unified control over multi-vendor cards within an openGear system. DashBoard is free to download from the openGear.tv website.

22 companies are indicated on the openGear website as openGear partners.
