= Richard Waugh (actor) =

Canadian actor and voice actor (born 1964)

- Born: February 28, 1964 (age 62); London, Ontario, Canada
- Occupations: Film actor; television actor; voice actor
- Spouse: Sarah Orenstein (m. 1989)
- Children: 2
- Website: waughric (Instagram Account)

Richard Waugh (born May 9, 1964) is a Canadian actor and voice actor, best known for providing the voice of Albert Wesker in the video games Resident Evil – Code: Veronica, Resident Evil Zero, and Resident Evil 4. He also voiced Wesker in a fictional documentary titled Wesker's Report, as well as voicing various minor characters throughout the Resident Evil franchise, He played as "Vice-Principal Stern" in My Babysitter's a Vampire in the movie and in the series as the principal antagonist using the Dark Magic with The Lucifractor in the final episode. His distinctive approach to voicing the Wesker character has influenced the performances of subsequent actors in the role, including Jason O'Mara (in the film Resident Evil: Extinction) and D. C. Douglas.

Waugh spent six years with the Shaw Festival and is a multiple award-winner for his work in commercials. On television, he was a member of the repertory cast of the A&E TV series A Nero Wolfe Mystery (2001–2002) and portrayed the character Sappenstein in the 2001 film The Score. In 2010, he played Donald Banse in the pilot episode of the CBS show Blue Bloods. He also played the title role of Jimmy MacDonald in Jimmy MacDonald's Canada, a 2005 comedy mockumentary that ran on CBC. In film, Waugh starred alongside Timothy Dalton in the film Possessed. He also had a brief appearance in the film Ice Bound: A Woman's Survival at the South Pole. He played Agent Thorn in the 2003 remake of The In-laws.

== Filmography ==
=== Film ===
| Year | Title | Role | Notes |
|---|---|---|---|
| 1995 | No Contest | Leslie | |
| 2000 | Possessed | Reverend Eckhardt | Television film |
| 2001 | The Score | Sapperstein | |
| 2003 | Ice Bound: A Woman's Survival at the South Pole | Hugh | Television film |
| 2003 | The In-Laws | Agent Thorn | |
| 2008 | One Week | Baseball Coach | |
| 2016 | The Second Time Around | Dr. Norris | |
| 2018 | Tabaluga | Kolk, Polar Bear, Snowkid Rabbit, Male Rabbit (voices) | |
| 2026 | Because of Cupid | Richard Kelly | |

=== Television ===
| Year | Title | Role | Notes |
|---|---|---|---|
| 1996, 98 | Blazing Dragons | Cinder, Clinker, Sir Galahot (voices) | 26 episodes |
| 2001–02 | A Nero Wolfe Mystery | Dr. Morley, Emil Hatch, Rudolph Faber, Guy Unger, Manuel Upton, Director #1, Don O'Neill, Capt. Jasper Colvin | 13 episodes |
| 2005 | Jimmy MacDonald's Canada | Jimmy MacDonald | 8 episodes |
| 2006 | Captain Flamingo | Milo's Dad (voice) | Episode: "The Flamingo Has Landed/Pancake Panic" |
| 2010 | Blue Bloods | Donald Banse | Episode: "Pilot" |
| 2011 | The Adventures of Chuck and Friends | Semi Steve (voice) | Episode: "Chuck's Back Up/Speed Indeed" |
| 2012 | My Babysitter's a Vampire | Vice Principal Stern | Season 2 |
| 2015–20 | Schitt's Creek | Herb Ertlinger | 2 episodes |
| 2016–17 | Designated Survivor | Jay Whitaker | 7 episodes |
| 2019–21 | Workin' Moms | Barry Perch | 4 episodes |
| 2020 | The Queen's Gambit | Mr. Bradley | 2 episodes |
| 2021 | The Hot Zone | Scott Parrish | 2 episodes |
| 2022 | The Kings of Napa | Dr. James Burrell | 2 episodes |
| 2022 | Ruby and the Well | Mr. Russell | Episode: "I Wish She Would Trust Me" |
| 2022 | Son of a Critch | Brendan Critch | Episode: "Merry Critch-mas" |
| 2023–24 | Chucky | Dr. Rosen | 2 episodes |
| 2025 | The Z-Suite | Bill | 6 episodes |

=== Video games ===
| Year | Title | Role | Notes |
|---|---|---|---|
| 2000 | Resident Evil – Code: Veronica | Albert Wesker | |
| 2002 | Resident Evil Zero | Albert Wesker | |
| 2005 | Resident Evil 4 | Albert Wesker | |
