= Pope Productions =

- Company type: Private
- Industry: Production
- Founded: St. John's, Newfoundland and Labrador Canada (1998)
- Headquarters: 245 Duckworth Street, St. John's
- Key people: Paul Pope
- Products: Feature Film, Documentary and Television
- Website: www.popeproduction.com

Pope Productions is a St. John's, Newfoundland and Labrador based company specializing in feature film, documentary and television formats. Founded in 1998 by Paul Pope, it has grown to be a prominent independent production company in Newfoundland and Labrador.

Founder Paul Pope died in April 2022. He was posthumously named by the Academy of Canadian Cinema and Television as a recipient of its Board of Directors Tribute Award at the 11th Canadian Screen Awards in 2023.

Pope Productions is now led by Lisa Porter, Paul Pope's wife and business partner.

== Titles ==
- Above and Beyond
- Diverted
- Grown Up Movie Star
- Hudson & Rex
- Life with Derek
- My Left Breast
- Rare Birds
- Record Man
- The One That Got Away
- The Wall
