= Elaine MacInnes =

Canadian nun and Zen master (1924–2022)

Elaine MacInnes OC OLM (7 April 1924 – 29 November 2022) was a Canadian Catholic nun and Zen master. She was notable for integrating Zen meditation with her Catholic faith and promoting the use of meditation and yoga in prisons as a tool for rehabilitation and spiritual growth.

== Early life and education ==
Elaine MacInnes was born in Moncton, New Brunswick, Canada and was the eldest of six children in a Catholic family. She demonstrated an early aptitude for music, leading her to study at Mount Allison University, where she earned a degree in music. She continued her education at The Juilliard School in New York City, before returning to Canada to teach at the Royal Conservatory of Music in Calgary and perform with the Edmonton Symphony Orchestra.

== Religious life and Zen practice ==
MacInnes entered the religious order of Our Lady's Missionaries in 1953. Initially sent to Japan to teach violin, she became interested in Zen meditation. Under the tutelage of Yamada Koun at the Sanbo Kyodan in Japan during the 1970s, she became a Zen Master (Roshi). MacInnes integrated her understanding of Zen meditation with her Catholic faith, focusing on the universal principles of spirituality.

== Work in prisons ==
MacInnes began teaching meditation in prisons in the Philippines in 1980. She responded to a request from individuals seeking ways to cope with the psychological impact of imprisonment and torture. She later expanded her efforts in the United Kingdom, where she collaborated with the Phoenix Prison Trust, an organization promoting yoga and meditation in prisons. Her work gained support from actor Jeremy Irons, who served as a patron of the Trust.

In 2004, MacInnes founded Freeing the Human Spirit, a Canadian non-profit organization dedicated to bringing meditation and yoga to incarcerated individuals. Under her leadership, the initiative reached 28 prisons across Canada by 2013, after which she retired from active involvement. The organization remains active.

== Publications ==
MacInnes wrote several books addressing spirituality, meditation and her experience in Zen practice. Key publications include:

- Light Sitting in Light: A Christian's Experience in Zen (1992) ISBN 9780006279488 ASIN 0006279481
- The Flowing Bridge: Guidance on Beginning Zen Koans (2008)
- Zen Contemplation for Christians (2012)
- Freeing the Spirit through Meditation and Yoga by Sandy Chubb, Korky Paul, and Sister Elaine MacInnes (1995)

== Recognition ==
MacInnes was named an Officer of the Order of Canada in 2001 for her contribution to prison rehabilitation through yoga and meditation. This recognition highlighted her international impact, particularly her work in the Philippines and the United Kingdom.

== Death and legacy ==
MacInnes died on 29 November 2022. The Sister Elaine MacInnes Community Impact Award, launched in 2024, recognizies outstanding yoga and meditation instructors in Canada.
