= House Calls (2006 film) =

- Directed by: Ian McLeod
- Distributed by: National Film Board of Canada
- Release date: 2006
- Running time: 55 minutes
- Country: Canada
- Language: English

House Calls is 2006 Canadian documentary film about Mark Nowaczynski, a Toronto physician and photographer who makes house calls to elderly patients unable to travel to a clinic or doctor's office. Written and directed by Ian McLeod, this National Film Board of Canada production received the Donald Brittain Award for Best Social/Political Documentary Program at the 2006 Gemini Awards.

In addition to being one of the few doctors who perform house calls, "Dr. Mark" began taking black and white photographs to document the lives of his patients, in an effort "to open doors, to open eyes and hopefully to open people's hearts" to the plight of the elderly. The film focuses on three of Nowaczynski's patients: Connie, aged 93 and partially blind, who longs to go back to her cat Oscar; Joe, aged 86, whose arthritis makes getting on a streetcar or bus impossible; and Ria, who at 90, had been a patient of Dr. Nowaczynski for 20 years and had just accepted his offer to have him come to her house. For Ria, it was a point of pride that she was able to come to his office.

An assistant professor in the Department of Family and Community Medicine at the University of Toronto Faculty of Medicine, Nowaczynski was inspired by the work of documentary photographer Lewis W. Hine, a teacher who turned to photography as a way to document the plight of child labourers at the turn of the 19th century.
