= Stuntdawgs =

- Created by: Peter H. Kent
- Presented by: Peter H. Kent
- Country of origin: Canada

Original release
- Network: The Movie Network
- Release: January 13 – April 5, 2006

Stuntdawgs is a Canadian documentary miniseries co-created and hosted by veteran stunt double Peter H. Kent. The miniseries premiered on January 13, 2006 on The Movie Network. Kent was a stunt double for Arnold Schwarzenegger in 14 movies.

A 13 half-hour miniseries, Peter H. Kent takes the viewer on a behind-the-scenes look at stunt work in Hollywood films and television series, by re-creating and explaining various stunts, including a motorcycle plunge from Terminator 2: Judgment Day.

== Cast ==
- Peter H. Kent
- Jeff Sanca
- Rikki Gagne
- Lars Grant
- Jimmy Broyden
- Peter Boulanger
- Kory Grimolfson
- David Campbell
- Ninon Parent
- Rob Wilton
- Leah Wagner
- Christopher Gordon
- Kirk Caouette
- Brett Armstrong
- Curt Bonn

== Awards and nominations ==
- 2006 Gemini Award winner for Best General/Human Interest Series
- 2006 Leo Awards nomination for Best Documentary Program or Series - Nature/Environment/Adventure/Science/Technology (David Gullason, Gabriela Schonbach)
