= Tim Southam =

Canadian film director

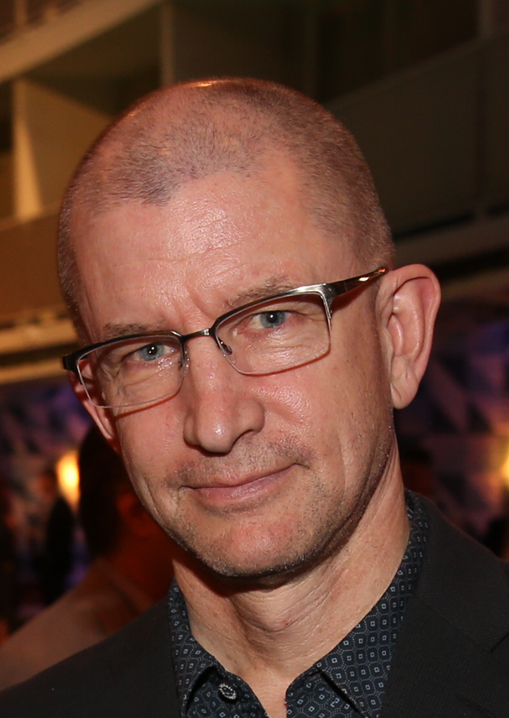
- Southam at the CFC in L.A.
- Born: October 1, 1961 (age 64)
- Occupations: Television and film director

Tim Southam (born October 1, 1961) is a Canadian television and film director.

== Career ==
Tim Southam's directing work includes Canadian films and international series.

His 1994 dance film Satie and Suzanne, which he also wrote, evokes Erik Satie's relationship with the painter Suzanne Valadon. The programme was nominated for a Grammy for best long-form video in 1997. His 1997 feature documentary, Drowning in Dreams, which tracks several men's obsession with a shipwreck lying at the bottom of Lake Superior, was screened at the 1997 Toronto International Film Festival and was nominated for a Genie Award. In 1998 Southam directed the CBC/ SRC film L'histoire de l'oie, known in English as The Tale of Teeka, which was adapted by Michel Marc Bouchard from his celebrated play of the same name, winning among other awards several Prix Gémeaux and The Banff Rockie.

In 2002 he directed the film The Bay of Love and Sorrows based on a 1998 novel by David Adams Richards, co-writing the film with the novelist. In 2005 his miniseries Trudeau II: Maverick in the Making, met with strong reviews, as did his documentary Perreault Dancer (Danser Perreault), which won the 2005 Montréal International Festival of Films on Art award for Best Canadian Work along with a 2006 Gemini Award for Best Direction in a Performing Arts Program or Series. His 2006 film One Dead Indian was also a critical and ratings success and won a Gemini Award for Best Direction in a Dramatic Program or Mini-Series.

While continuing to make films and documentaries, Southam started directing episodic TV in 2001 with two episodes of the crime series Blue Murder and several episodes of the comedy series Naked Josh, 2004–2006. From 2006 to 2011 he directed all eight episodes of the Canadian comedy series Moose TV starring Adam Beach; five episodes of Trey Anthony's Da Kink in my Hair; two episodes of Heartland; an episode of Flashpoint; two episodes of Douglas Coupland's series JPod; and three episodes of Haven. He was also a writer in 1995 and 1996 for the Canadian drama series Traders writing three episodes and serving as Story Editor in season one.

In July 2011 Southam directed the CTV pilot Stay With Me starring Andrea Roth. The same summer he directed the pilot for CBC's Cracked, which ran for two seasons, as well as an episode of Rookie Blue.

In 2008 Southam began an extended run as a director and a producer in international series, directing nine episodes of Bones and two of House for Fox; three episodes of Bates Motel for A&E, one episode of The Dead Zone and seven episodes in all three seasons of Colony for USA Network; one episode of Hell on Wheels, two episodes in season one of NOS4A2, and two episodes in season one of The Walking Dead: Daryl Dixon for AMC/AMC+; two episodes of Hap & Leonard for Sundance; one episode of American Gods for Starz; and for Netflix five episodes in seasons one and two of Lost in Space, two episodes in season one of Locke & Key and two episodes in season one of One Piece.

In addition to directing Southam served as Supervising Producer on his pilot for Cracked, Producer on season four of Bates Motel, Co-Executive Producer on season three of Colony, Executive Producer on season one of Locke & Key, and Executive Producer on season one of One Piece.

Southam's Bates Motel episode ”Forever” was listed by The New York Times in its roundup of ‘memorable episodes of 2016’ and by the Hollywood Reporter as one of fifteen best episodes of 2016. In 2021 Southam won the DGC Award for Outstanding Directorial Achievement in a Dramatic Series for his American Gods episode "The Rapture of Burning". At its launch on August 31, 2023 One Piece received positive reviews from audience and critics, was rated the number one original series on Nielsen's streaming charts, spent three weeks at number one on Netflix Global Top Ten TV chart, and eight weeks in the chart's global top ten.

Tim Southam sits on the National Executive Board of the Directors Guild of Canada, and served for six years as Chair of the Guild's National Directors Division, and for six years as its National President.

== Personal life ==
Southam is married to Eda Holmes, who is artistic director of Montreal's Centaur Theatre.
