= 22nd Gemini Awards =

2007 awards for Canadian television

- Date: October 28, 2007
- Venue: Conexus Arts Centre, Regina
- Hosted by: George Stroumboulopoulos

Television/radio coverage
- Network: CBC Television

The Academy of Canadian Cinema & Television's 22nd Gemini Awards were held on October 28, 2007, to honour achievements in Canadian television. The awards show, which was hosted by George Stroumboulopoulos, took place at the Conexus Arts Centre in Regina, Saskatchewan and was broadcast on CBC.

== Best Dramatic Series ==
- Slings & Arrows – Rhombus Media. Producers: Sari Friedland, Niv Fichman
- ReGenesis – The Movie Network, Movie Central, Shaftesbury Films. Producers: Christina Jennings, Tom Chehak, Scott Garvie, Laura Harbin, Shane Kinnear, Manny Danelon, Avrum Jacobson
- Intelligence – Haddock Entertainment. Producers: Chris Haddock, Laura Lightbown, Arvi Liimatainen
- Whistler – Blueprint Entertainment, Boardwatch Productions, Uphill Productions, CTV Television Network. Producers: Danny Virtue, John Barbisan, Kelly Senecal, Noreen Halpern, Janet York, John Morayniss, Sam Feldman, Ian McDougall
- Jozi-H – Morula Pictures, Inner City Films. Producers: Alfons Adetuyi, Adeelah Carrim, Tony Dennis, Alyson Feltes, Marva Ollivierre, Stephen J. Turnbull, Mfundi Vundla

== Best Dramatic Mini-Series ==
- Dragon Boys – Omnifilm Entertainment, Anchor Point Pictures, Canadian Broadcasting Corporation. Producers: Howard Dancyger, Michael Chechik, Ian Weir
- Answered by Fire – Beyond Simpson Le Mesurier, Muse Entertainment, Terra Rossa Pictures, Powercorp, The Paperback Company Films. Producers: Andrew Walker, Roger Simpson, Roger Le Mesurier, Michael Prupas, Barbara Samuels

== Best TV Movie ==
- Doomstown – Sarrazin Couture Entertainment. Producers: Pierre Sarrazin, Suzette Couture, Susan Murdoch
- Eight Days To Live – Shaftesbury Films, CTV Television Network. Producers: Christina Jennings, Ken Gord, Scott Garvie, Graham Ludlow, Laurie Mclarty, Virginia Rankin, Kelly Rowan
- In God's Country – Shaftesbury Films. Producers: Christina Jennings, Scott Garvie, Graham Ludlow, Laurie Mclarty, Robert O. Green, Kelly Rowan, Julie Lacey, Paul Stephens
- Last Exit – Forum Films, Foundry Films. Producers: Richard Lalonde
- The Robber Bride – Shaftesbury Films. Producers: Christina Jennings, Scott Garvie, Brian Dennis, Julia Stannard, Simon Wright

== Best Comedy Program or Series ==
- Corner Gas – CTV Television Network, Prairie Pants Productions. Producers: Brent Butt, David Storey, Virginia Thompson, Paul Mather
- Odd Job Jack – Smiley Guy Studios. Producers: Denny Silverthorne, Adrian Carter, Jonas Diamond, Jeremy Diamond
- Rent-a-Goalie – Eggplant Picture & Sound, Fifth Ground Entertainment, Georgian Entertainment. Producers: Christopher Bolton, Chris Szarka
- Air Farce Live – Canadian Broadcasting Corporation. Producers: Don Ferguson, Roger Abbott
- This Hour Has 22 Minutes – Halifax Film Company, Canadian Broadcasting Corporation. Producers: Mark Farrell, Susan MacDonald, Jack Kellum, Jenipher Ritchie, Geoff D'Eon, Michael Donovan

== Best Music, Variety Program or Series ==
- 2006 MuchMusic Video Awards – MuchMusic. Producers: John Kampilis, Sheila Sullivan, Dave Russell
- Video on Trial – ‘80s Superstars – CHUM Limited, CTV GlobeMedia. Producers: Kerry Cunningham, Jason Ford, John Kampilis
- Juno Awards of 2007 – Canadian Academy of Recording Arts and Sciences, CTV Television Network. Producers: John Brunton, Melanie Berry, Barbara Bowlby, Louise Wood, Lindsay Cox, Stephen Stohn
- Canadian Idol – Insight Productions, 19 Entertainment, FremantleMedia North America, Canadian Broadcasting Corporation. Producers: John Brunton, Barbara Bowlby, Sue Brophey, Mark Lysakowski
- Live at the Rehearsal Hall – Bravo!. Producers: Robert Benson, John Gunn

== Best Performing Arts Program or Series, or Arts Documentary Program or Series ==
- Cirque du Soleil: Lovesick – Galafilm, Créations Musca. Producers: Valérie Beaugrand-Champagne, Arnie Gelbart, Vincent Gagné, Martin Bolduc
- Landscape as Muse – 291 Film Company. Producer: Ian Toews
- Ode to a Requiem – Cinepro Productions. Producer: Craig Graham
- Prisoners of Beckett – Arte, Qu4tre par Quatre, National Film Board of Canada. Producers: J. Bergeron, Jacques Debs, Joanne Carrière, Éric Michel, Joseph Hillel, D. Morel
- Roxana – Mossanen Productions. Producers: Stephen Traynor, Moze Mossanen

== Best Talk Series ==
- George Stroumboulopoulos Tonight – Canadian Broadcasting Corporation. Producers: Jennifer Dettman, Susan Taylor, George Stroumboulopoulos
- Live at Much – MuchMusic. Producer: John Kampilis

== Best Reality Program or Series ==
- Canada's Next Top Model – Temple Street Productions. Producers: Ivan Schneeberg, David Fortier, Sheila Hockin, Ron Carroll
- 5 Seekers – Seekers Entertainment. Producers: Allan Novak, Joan Jenkinson, Ralph Benmergui
- Design Interns – Firvalley Productions. Producers: Maria Pimentel, Joseph Blasioli
- Dragons' Den – Celador, Canadian Broadcasting Corporation. Producers: Mike Downie, Tracie Tighe, Stuart Coxe
- The Next Great Chef – Next Entertainment. Producers: Edi Osghian, Giuliana Bertuzzi, Nick Versteeg

== Best General/Human Interest Series ==
- Bathroom Divas – Kaleidoscope Entertainment. Producers: Mary Lou Fallis, Mike Ward, Paul McConvey, Marshall Kesten, Randy Zalken
- On Screen! – Pippin Productions, Soapbox Productions. Producer: Nick Orchard
- On the Run – Exploration Production. Producers: Edwina Follows, Kathryn Oughtred
- Road Hockey Rumble – Paperny Entertainment. Producers: Cal Shumiatcher, Jonathan Goodwill, David Paperny
- Situation Critical – Darlow Smithson Productions, Breakthrough Entertainment. Producers: Ira Levy, Ron Singer, Peter Williamson, Kirsten Scollie, Barri Cohen, Catherine May, Paul Kilback

== Donald Brittain Award for Best Social/Political Documentary Program ==
- Fatherland – Barna-Alper Productions. Producers: Manfred Becker, Laszlo Barna
- Bombay Calling – National Film Board of Canada. Producers: Adam Symansky, Sally Bochner
- Cottonland – National Film Board of Canada. Producers: Kent Martin, Annette Clarke
- EMPz 4 Life – TVOntario, At Home in the Hood Films. Producers: Rudy Buttignol, Kathy Avrich-Johnson, Allan King
- Faith Without Fear – National Film Board of Canada, 90th Parallel Productions. Producers: Silva Basmajian, Gordon Henderson
- Martyr Street – Bishari Films. Producers: Deborah Parks, Shelley Saywell

== Best Documentary Series ==
- Global Currents – Global Television Network. Producer: Michael J. Ghent
- Life and Times – Canadian Broadcasting Corporation. Producers: Marie Natanson, Linda Laughlin
- CBC News: The Lens – Canadian Broadcasting Corporation. Producer: Andrew Johnson
- Half Mile of Hell – Zoom Communications. Producers: Jeff Bradshaw, Grant Nolin
- What's That About? – Pixcom. Producers: Nicola Merola, Carole Dufour, Sylvie Desrochers, Jacquelin Bouchard

== Best History Documentary Program ==
- The Secret History of 9/11 – Canadian Broadcasting Corporation. Producers: Terence McKenna, Michelle Gagnon
- Turning Points of History – Hitler's Children – Barna-Alper Productions, Connections Productions. Producers: Alan Mendelsohn, Laszlo Barna
- Mission: Suez – Canadian Broadcasting Corporation. Producer: William Cobban
- The Bomber's Dream – Barna-Alper Productions. Producers: Laszlo Barna, Jeff Vanderwal, Barry Stevens
- The Great War: The Complete History of WWI – Galafilm. Producers: Arnie Gelbart, Natalie Dubois, Stephen Phizicky, Janet Torge, Brian McKenna

== Best Biography Documentary Program ==
- Life and Times – Dangerous When Provoked: The Life and Times of Terry Mosher – Canadian Broadcasting Corporation. Producer: John Curtin
- As Seen on TV: The K-Tel Story – MidCanada Entertainment, Tenor 20 Productions. Producers: Wayne Shelton, Danielle Audette, Kevin Dunn
- Life and Times – Leading Man: The Life and Times of William Hutt – Canadian Broadcasting Corporation. Producers: Joel Gordon, Richard Nielsen
- Born to Be Nelly Furtado – MuchMusic. Producers: Morgan Rozender, Jason Ford, John Kampilis
- John Turner: In His Own Words – Stornoway Productions. Producers: Paul Kemp, Kitson Vincent, Gavin Adamson
- The Cult of Walt: Canada's Polka King – Joe Media Group. Producers: Joe Novak, Brent Kawchuk

== Best Science, Technology, Nature, Environment or Adventure Documentary Program ==
- Gamer Revolution – Frantic Films. Producers: Marc de Guerre, Rachel Low
- The Nature of Things – Tsepong: A Clinic Called Hope – Canadian Broadcasting Corporation. Producer: Peter Raymont
- Spam: The Documentary – Chocolate Box Entertainment. Producers: Scott Dobson, Jeannette Loakman, Andrew Gregg, Sally Blake
- Light at the Edge of the World – The Wayfinders – 90th Parallel Productions. Producers: Wade Davis, Gordon Henderson, Andrew Gregg
- There's Something Out There – A Bigfoot Encounter – Farpoint Films. Producer: Kyle Bornais

== Best News Information Series ==
- the fifth estate – Canadian Broadcasting Corporation. Producers: Sally Reardon, David Studer
- CBC News: Sunday – Canadian Broadcasting Corporation. Producers: Michael Kearns, Patsy Pehleman
- Marketplace – Canadian Broadcasting Corporation. Producers: Michael Gruzuk, Tassie Notar

== Best News Magazine Segment ==
- The National/CBC News – The Enemy Within – Canadian Broadcasting Corporation. Producers: Mark Kelley, Andy Hincenbergs, Catherine Legge, Aileen McBride
- CBC News: Sunday – Canadian Broadcasting Corporation. Producers: Farhan Ahmad, Eric Foss, Evan Solomon
- The National/CBC News – Finding Normal – Canadian Broadcasting Corporation. Producers: Michelle Cheung, David Donnelly, David MacIntosh, Brian Patti, Kamala Rao
- The National/CBC News – Prince Rupert School – Canadian Broadcasting Corporation. Producers: Mark Kelley, Andy Hincenbergs, Chris Davies, Catherine Legge, Claude Panet-Raymond, Kathryn Dickson
- CBC News: Sunday Night – Canadian Broadcasting Corporation. Producers: Carole MacNeil, Heather Loughran, Eric Foss, Farhan Admad, Tony Marchitto

== Best Newscast ==
- Global National – Global News. Producers: Kenton Boston, Doriana Temolo, Marc Dillon Riddell, Jason Keel, Kevin Newman
- CityNews – Citytv. Producers: Stephen Hurlbut, Derek Miller, Tina Cortese
- The National/CBC News – Canadian Broadcasting Corporation. Producers: Jonathan Whitten, Mark Harrison, Fred Parker, Greg Reaume, Terry Auciello

== Best News Special Event Coverage ==
- CBC News: Sunday – Grandmother's Gathering – Canadian Broadcasting Corporation. Producers: Aaron Williams, Roger Beattie, Michael Kearns, Helen Bagshaw
- CBC News: Liberal Leadership Convention – Canadian Broadcasting Corporation. Producers: Fred Parker, Bob Weiers, Mark Bulgutch
- CBC News: Vimy Ridge 90 – Canadian Broadcasting Corporation. Producers: Fred Parker, Tom Dinsmore, Mark Bulgutch
- CityNews – CityVote 2006 – Citytv. Producers: Stephen Hurlbut, Katia Del Col, Tina Cortese
- Global National – Canada Remembers – Global News. Producers: Kenton Boston, Pam MacKenzie, Kam Razavi, Jason Keel, Marc Dillon Riddell

== Best Lifestyle/Practical Information Series ==
- CityLine – Citytv. Producer: Chrissie Rejman
- Opening Soon – Red Apple Entertainment. Producers: Rachel Low, Daniel Gelfant
- On the Road Again – Canadian Broadcasting Corporation. Producers: Louis Battistelli, Malcolm Hamilton, Ruth Zowdu
- Recreating Eden – Merit Motion Pictures. Producer: Merit Jensen Carr
- The Heat with Mark McEwan – General Purpose Pictures. Producer: Scott Clark McNeil

== Best Lifestyle/Practical Information Segment ==
- Living Vancouver – Canadian Broadcasting Corporation. Producers: Jennifer Burke, Gary Prendergast, Peter Steel, Wendy Vreeken
- On the Road Again – Canadian Broadcasting Corporation. Producers: Aldo Columpsi, Roger Lefebvre, Wayne Rostad, Malcolm Hamilton
- Daily Planet – Gunther's Thin Slices – Discovery Channel. Producers: Brian Marleau, Carol McGrath
- The Shopping Bags – Closet Organizers – Force Four Entertainment, Worldwide Bag Media. Producers: Jackie Sidoni, Mark Pitkethly, Brian Beard, Catherine Atyeo, Sean De Vries
- SexTV – A Key to Curing HIV? – CHUM Television, Corus Entertainment. Producer: Judith Pyke

== Best Animated Program or Series ==
- Skyland – Method Animation, 9 Story Entertainment. Producers: Vince Commisso, Steve Jarosz, Marilyn McAuley
- Captain Flamingo (Atomic Cartoons/Breakthrough Entertainment/Heroic Television/Philippine Animation Studio). Producers: Kevin Gillis, Kirsten Scollie, Mimbi Eloriaga, Trevor Bentley, Suzanne Bolch, John May, Karen Lee Hall, Ira Levy, Peter Williamson, Lani Barcelona, Rob Davies
- The Naughty Naughty Pets – Decode Entertainment, C.O.R.E. Producers: Steve Denure, Neil Court, Beth Stevenson, Wendy Gardner, Kim Hyde
- Ruby Gloom – Nelvana. Producers: Scott Dyer, Jocelyn Hamilton, Patricia R. Burns, Doug Murphy, Rita Street
- Sons of Butcher – S&S Productions, Smiley Guy Studios. Producer: Max Smith

== Best Pre-School Program or Series ==
- The Backyardigans – Nelvana, Nickelodeon Animation Studio. Producers: Scott Dyer, Jocelyn Hamilton, Ellen Martin, Doug Murphy, Tracey Dodokin, Jennifer Hill, Janice Burgess, Robert Scull, Patricia R. Burns
- Roll Play – Sinking Ship Entertainment. Producers: J. J. Johnson, Liz Haines, Blair Powers, Matt Bishop
- The Doodlebops – Cookie Jar Entertainment. Producers: Jamie Waese, Michael Hirsh
- This Is Emily Yeung. – Marblemedia, Sinking Ship Entertainment. Producers: Matthew Hornburg, Blair Powers, Mark J.W.Bishop, J. J. Johnson, Matt Bishop
- Toopy and Binoo – Spectra Animation. Producers: Luc Châtelain, André A. Bélanger

== Best Children’s or Youth Fiction Program or Series ==
- Wapos Bay – Karma Film. Producers: Dennis Jackson, Melanie Jackson, Derek Mazur, Anand Ramayya
- Degrassi: The Next Generation – Bell Media, Epitome Pictures. Producers: Linda Schuyler, James Hurst, Stephanie Williams, David Lowe, Stephen Stohn
- Jacob Two-Two – Nelvana, Salter Street Films. Producers: Scott Dyer, Vince Commisso, Steve Jarosz, Marilyn McAuley, Doug Murphy
- Alice, I Think – Omnifilm Entertainment, Slanted Wheel Entertainment. Producers: Gabriela Schonbach, Brian Hamilton, Jon Slan
- Spirit Bear: The Simon Jackson Story – Screen Door. Producers: Heather Haldane, Mary Young Leckie, Raymond Massey, Cheryl-Lee Fast

== Best Children's or Youth Non-Fiction Program or Series ==
- Make Some Noise – Omnifilm Entertainment. Producers: Heather Hawthorn-Doyle, Michael Chechik, Brian Hamilton
- Heads Up! – Look Back Productions. Producer: Nick Orchard
- Ballet Girls – Vonnie Von Helmolt Film, Merit Motion Pictures. Producers: Merit Jensen Carr, Vonnie Von Helmut
- Doc Zone – Generation XXL – Canadian Broadcasting Corporation. Producers: Jonathan Finkelstein, Jason Levy, Stacey Tenenbaum

== Best Sports Program or Series ==
- NHL on TSN – TSN. Producer: Mark Milliere
- CFL on CBC – Pregame Show – CBC Sports. Producers: Trevor Pilling, Joe Scarcelli
- Hockey Night in Canada – Coach's Corner – CBC Sports. Producers: Joel Darling, Kathy Broderick, Sherali Najak, Brian Spear
- Bell Spirit of the Game – Own the Podium – Bradford Productions. Producers: Brad Diamond, Isabel Diamond

== Best Sports Feature Segment ==
- Peter Jordan's Grey Cup Adventure – Frantic Films. Producer: Jeff Peeler
- CBC News at Six Saskatchewan – The Runner – Canadian Broadcasting Corporation. Producers: Aldo Columpsi, Jordan Bell, Costa Maragos
- The National/CBC News – Cycle of Denial – Canadian Broadcasting Corporation. Producer: Stephanie Jenzer

== Best Live Sporting Event ==
- Hockey Night in Canada – Stanley Cup Finals: Carolina @ Edmonton Game 3 – CBC Sports. Producers: Joel Darling, Sherali Najak
- CFL on CBC – 94th Grey Cup Championship – CBC Sports. Producers: Trevor Pilling, Joe Scarcelli
- 2007 World Junior Ice Hockey Championships – Semi-Final – TSN. Producers: Jim Marshall, Jon Hynes

== Best Cross-Platform Project ==
- Odd Job Jack – OddJobJack.com – Smiley Guy Studios. Producers: Adrian Carter, Jeremy Diamond, Jonas Diamond, Denny Silverthorne
- Life with Derek – Podcasts – Shaftesbury Films, Pope Productions. Producers: Shane Kinnear, Suzanne French, Jarrett Sherman
- Falcon Beach – falconbeach.ca – Insight Productions, Original Pictures. Producers: Barbara Bowlby, Kim Todd, John Murray, Shannon Farr, Wayne Helman, John Brunton
- Canadian Idol – idol4.ctv.ca – Insight Productions, 19 Entertainment, FremantleMedia North America, Canadian Broadcasting Corporation. Producers: Rachel Calderon, Sandy Yang, Saira Peesker, Lisa Gigliotti
- NHL on TSN – tsn.ca/nhl – TSN. Producer: Mike Day

== Best Direction in a Dramatic Program or Miniseries ==
- Sudz Sutherland – Doomstown (Sarrazin Couture Entertainment)
- Jessica Hobbs – Answered by Fire (Beyond Simpson Le Mesurier/Muse Entertainment/Terra Rossa Pictures/Powercorp/The Paperback Company Films)
- Norma Bailey – Eight Days To Live (Shaftesbury Films/CTV)
- Alex Chapple – Shades of Black: The Conrad Black Story (Screen Door)
- Rachel Talalay – The Wind in the Willows (BBC/CBC)

== Best Direction in a Dramatic Series ==
- Chris Haddock – Intelligence – Down But Not Out (Haddock Entertainment)
- Stephen Surjik – Intelligence – Not a Nice Boy! (Haddock Entertainment)
- George Mihalka – Jozi-H – Love in the Time of AIDS (Morula Pictures/Inner City Films)
- Kelly Makin – Jozi-H – Fathers (Morula Pictures/Inner City Films)
- John Fawcett – Bon Voyage, Part 3 (Box TV/Cité-Amérique)

== Best Direction in a News Information Program or Series ==
- Harvey Cashore – the fifth estate – Luck of the Draw (CBC)
- Tamar Weinstein – the fifth estate – Lost in the Struggle (CBC)
- Catherine Annau – the fifth estate – The Good Father (CBC)
- Litsa Sourtzis – Marketplace (CBC)
- Sylvène Gilchrist – CBC News: Correspondent (CBC)

== Best Direction in a Documentary Program ==
- David Ridgen – Mississippi Cold Case (CBC)
- Nance Ackerman, Eddie Buchanan – Cottonland (NFB)
- Shelley Saywell – Martyr Street (Bishari Films)
- Scot McFadyen, Sam Dunn – Metal: A Headbanger's Journey (Banger Films)
- Katerina Cizek – The Interventionists – Chronicles of a Mental Health Crisis Team (NFB)

== Best Direction in a Documentary Series ==
- Laine Drewery – Hockey: A People's History – A Simple Game (CBC)
- Ian Toews – Landscape as Muse (291 Film Company)
- Michael Claydon – Hockey: A People's History – Reclaiming the Game (CBC)
- Peter John Ingles – Hockey: A People's History – The People’s Game (CBC)
- Don Young – Devil’s Brigade, Episode 4 (Frantic Films)

== Best Direction in a Comedy Program or Series ==
- Henry Sarwer-Foner – Rick Mercer Report – Episode 5 (CBC/Island Edge)
- Robert de Lint – Corner Gas – The Good Old Table Hockey Game (CTV/Prairie Pants Productions)
- Geoff D’Eon – This Hour Has 22 Minutes – Stand Up In Kandahar (Halifax Film Company/CBC)
- Michael Kennedy – Little Mosque on the Prairie – The Convert (WestWind Pictures)
- Phil Price – The Business – Strings (Philms Pictures)

== Best Direction in a Variety Program or Series ==
- Rafaël Ouellet – Avril Lavigne: Exclusive
- Joan Tosoni – Juno Awards of 2007 (Canadian Academy of Recording Arts and Sciences/CTV)
- Shelagh O'Brien – Words to Music: The Canadian Songwriters Hall of Fame 2007 (Cansong Productions)
- Shelagh O'Brien – 2007 East Coast Music Awards (East Coast Music Association/CBC)

== Best Direction in a Performing Arts Program or Series ==
- Seth-Adrian Harris – When Moses Woke (Seth-Adrian Harris)
- Lewis Cohen – Cirque du Soleil: Lovesick (Galafilm/Créations Musca)
- Donald Winkler – Ode to a Requiem (Cinepro Productions)
- Yosif Feyginberg – Moving To His Music: The Two Muses of Guillaume Côté
- Larry Weinstein – Mozartballs (Rhombus Media)

== Best Direction in a Lifestyle/Practical Information Program or Series ==
- Eric Geringas – Opening Soon – Salt House (Red Apple Entertainment)
- Jim Ripley – The Thirsty Traveler – Mississippi/Louisiana: A River of Whiskey (Grasslands Entertainment)
- Elise Swerhone – Recreating Eden – The Lost Pears (Merit Motion Pictures)
- Henry Less – Made to Order – Dim Sum (Mercer Street Films)
- Phyllis Ellis – Made to Order – World Gourmet Summit (Mercer Street Films)

== Best Direction in a Children's or Youth Program or Series ==
- Joseph Sherman – Johnny Test – Saturday Night's Alright for Johnny/Johnny's Mint Chip (Warner Bros. Television Studios)
- Graeme Campbell – Instant Star – I Fought the Law (DHX Media)
- Pat Williams – Instant Star – Personality Crisis (DHX Media)
- Rick Marshall – Peep and the Big Wide World – Dry Duck (WGBH-TV/9 Story Entertainment/TVOntario/Discovery Kids/Eggbox/NFB)
- Robert Cohen – The Great Polar Bear Adventure (Optix Digital Pictures/Media Headquarters

== Best Direction in a Live Sporting Event ==
- Ron Forsythe – Hockey Night in Canada – Stanley Cup Finals: Edmonton @ Carolina Game 7 (CBC Sports)
- Geoff Johnson – CFL on CBC – Eastern Semi-Final (CBC Sports)
- Richard Wells – PGA Tour – Canadian Open, 3rd Round (TSN)

== Best Writing in a Dramatic Program or Miniseries ==
- Ian Weir – Dragon Boys (Omnifilm Entertainment/Anchor Point Pictures/CBC)
- Sudz Sutherland – Doomstown (Sarrazin Couture Entertainment)
- Tassie Cameron – The Robber Bride (Shaftesbury Films)
- Moze Mossanen – Roxana (Mossanen Productions)
- John W. Doyle, Lisa Porter – Above and Beyond (Shaftesbury Films)

== Best Writing in a Dramatic Series ==
- Susan Coyne, Bob Martin, Mark McKinney – Slings & Arrows – That Way Madness Lies (Rhombus Media)
- Chris Haddock – Intelligence – Down But Not Out (Haddock Entertainment)
- Jesse McKeown – Robson Arms – Mussolini and Me (Omnifilm Entertainment/Creative Atlantic Communications)
- David Moses – Robson Arms – Saultology (Omnifilm Entertainment/Creative Atlantic Communications)
- Martin Gero – Stargate Atlantis – McKay and Mrs. Miller (Acme Shark Productions/Sony Pictures Television)

== Best Writing in a Comedy or Variety Program or Series ==
- Mark Farrell – Corner Gas – Gopher It (CTV/Prairie Pants Productions)
- Brent Butt – Corner Gas – Kid Stuff (CTV/Prairie Pants Productions)
- Paul Mather – Corner Gas – Blog River (CTV/Prairie Pants Productions)
- Paul Mather, Greg Eckler, Chris Finn, Rick Mercer, Tim Steeves – Rick Mercer Report – Episode 5 (CBC/Island Edge)
- Alan Rae – Little Mosque on the Prairie – The Convert (WestWind Pictures)

== Best Writing in an Information Program or Series ==
- Donna Gall – Recreating Eden – Gardens in the Sky (Merit Motion Pictures)
- Gillian Findlay – the fifth estate – Luck of the Draw (CBC)
- Colin McNeil – The Re-Inventors (Wavelength Entertainment)
- Michael Prini – Design Inc.
- Darrow MacIntyre – The National/CBC News (CBC)

== Best Writing in a Documentary Program or Series ==
- Scot McFadyen, Sam Dunn – Metal: A Headbanger's Journey (Banger Films)
- Michka Saäl – Prisoners of Beckett (Arte/Qu4tre par Quatre/NFB)
- Don Young – Devil’s Brigade, Episode 4 (Frantic Films)
- Simcha Jacobovici, Graeme Ball – The Lost Tomb of Jesus (Eggplant Picture & Sound)
- Michael Allcock – Vimy Ridge: Heaven To Hell (Yap Films)

== Best Writing in a Children's or Youth's Program or Series ==
- Sara Snow – renegadepress.com – Blackout (Vérité Films)
- Gary Wheeler – Jacob Two-Two (Nelvana/Salter Street Films)
- Trevor Cameron – Wapos Bay – Something to Remember (Karma Film)
- Seán Cullen – Grossology – Fartzilla (Nelvana)
- Ramelle Mair, David Acer – Mystery Hunters – Giant Shark (Apartment 11 Productions)

== Best Performance by an Actor in a Leading Role in a Dramatic Program or Miniseries ==
- Shawn Doyle – The Robber Bride (Shaftesbury Films)
- Byron Mann – Dragon Boys (Omnifilm Entertainment/Anchor Point Pictures/CBC)
- David Wenham – Answered by Fire (Beyond Simpson Le Mesurier/Muse Entertainment/Terra Rossa Pictures/Powercorp/The Paperback Company Films)
- K.C. Collins – Doomstown (Sarrazin Couture Entertainment)
- Kristopher Turner – Me and Luke (Shaftesbury Films)

== Best Performance by an Actress in a Leading Role in a Dramatic Program or Miniseries ==
- Mary-Louise Parker – The Robber Bride (Shaftesbury Films)
- Steph Song – Dragon Boys (Omnifilm Entertainment/Anchor Point Pictures/CBC)
- Isabelle Blais – Answered by Fire (Beyond Simpson Le Mesurier/Muse Entertainment/Terra Rossa Pictures/Powercorp/The Paperback Company Films)
- Genelle Williams – Doomstown (Sarrazin Couture Entertainment)
- Kathleen Robertson – Last Exit (Forum Films/Foundry Films)

== Best Performance by an Actor in a Continuing Leading Dramatic Role ==
- Paul Gross – Slings & Arrows – The Promised End (Rhombus Media)
- Peter Outerbridge – ReGenesis – Dust in the Wind (The Movie Network/Movie Central/Shaftesbury Films)
- Ian Tracey – Intelligence – Down But Not Out (Haddock Entertainment)
- William Hutt – Slings & Arrows – The Promised End (Rhombus Media)
- John Cassini – Intelligence – Down But Not Out (Haddock Entertainment)

== Best Performance by an Actress in a Continuing Leading Dramatic Role ==
- Martha Burns – Slings & Arrows – All Blessed Secrets (Rhombus Media)
- Klea Scott – Intelligence – Where Good Men Die Like Dogs (Haddock Entertainment)
- Susan Coyne – Slings & Arrows – All Blessed Secrets (Rhombus Media)
- Gabrielle Miller – Robson Arms – Texas Birthmark (Omnifilm Entertainment/Creative Atlantic Communications)

== Best Performance by an Actor in a Guest Role Dramatic Series ==
- Stephen Amell – ReGenesis – Sleepers (The Movie Network/Movie Central/Shaftesbury Films)
- Leslie Nielsen – Robson Arms – Ordinary Assholes (Omnifilm Entertainment/Creative Atlantic Communications)
- Michael Seater – ReGenesis – I Dream of Genomes (The Movie Network/Movie Central/Shaftesbury Films)
- Chris Leavins – Slings & Arrows – That Way Madness Lies (Rhombus Media)
- Paul Soles – The Jane Show – Tasting (Shaftesbury Films)

== Best Performance by an Actress in a Guest Role Dramatic Series ==
- Ingrid Kavelaars – ReGenesis – Phantoms (The Movie Network/Movie Central/Shaftesbury Films)
- L. Scott Caldwell – Jozi-H – Love in the Time of AIDS (Morula Pictures/Inner City Films)
- Brandy Ledford – Whistler – Unearthed (Blueprint Entertainment/Boardwatch Productions/Uphill Productions/CTV)
- Joy Tanner – ReGenesis – Sleepers (The Movie Network/Movie Central/Shaftesbury Films)
- Linda Kash – Robson Arms – Mr. Lonely (Omnifilm Entertainment/Creative Atlantic Communications)
- Geri Hall – The Jane Show – Rules of Engagement (Shaftesbury Films)

== Best Performance by an Actor in a Featured Supporting Role in a Dramatic Series ==
- Stephen Ouimette – Slings & Arrows – That Way Madness Lies (Rhombus Media)
- Fred Ewanuick – Robson Arms – Saultology (Omnifilm Entertainment/Creative Atlantic Communications)
- Dmitry Chepovetsky – ReGenesis – One Hand Washes the Other (The Movie Network/Movie Central/Shaftesbury Films)
- Haig Sutherland – Robson Arms – Mr. Lonely (Omnifilm Entertainment/Creative Atlantic Communications)
- Don McKellar – Slings & Arrows – That Way Madness Lies (Rhombus Media)

== Best Performance by an Actress in a Featured Supporting Role in a Dramatic Series ==
- Wendy Crewson – ReGenesis – Let It Burn (The Movie Network/Movie Central/Shaftesbury Films)
- Lynda Boyd – Falcon Beach – The Spins (Insight Productions/Original Pictures)
- Jeananne Goossen – Falcon Beach – Strawberry Social (Insight Productions/Original Pictures)
- Mayko Nguyen – ReGenesis – Dust in the Wind (The Movie Network/Movie Central/Shaftesbury Films)
- Sarah Polley – Slings & Arrows – Vex Not His Ghost (Rhombus Media)

== Best Performance by an Actor in a Featured Supporting Role in a Dramatic Program or Miniseries ==
- Jonathan Scarfe – Above and Beyond (Shaftesbury Films)
- Eric Tsang – Dragon Boys (Omnifilm Entertainment/Anchor Point Pictures/CBC)
- Mark Taylor – Doomstown (Sarrazin Couture Entertainment)
- Shawn Doyle – Eight Days To Live (Shaftesbury Films/CTV)
- Stuart Hughes – Booky Makes Her Mark (Platt Productions/Shaftesbury Films/CBC)

== Best Performance by an Actress in a Featured Supporting Role in a Dramatic Program or Miniseries ==
- Yanna McIntosh – Doomstown (Sarrazin Couture Entertainment)
- Jean Yoon – Dragon Boys (Omnifilm Entertainment/Anchor Point Pictures/CBC)
- Tegan Moss – Eight Days To Live (Shaftesbury Films/CTV)
- Wendy Crewson – The Robber Bride (Shaftesbury Films)
- Megan Follows – Booky Makes Her Mark (Platt Productions/Shaftesbury Films/CBC)

== Best Individual Performance in a Comedy Program or Series ==
- Phyllis Ellis – The Wilkinsons – I Don't Want to Lose You to LA (Henry Less Productions)
- Rick Mercer – Rick Mercer Report – Episode 5 (CBC/Island Edge)
- Teresa Pavlinek – The Jane Show – House of Jane (Shaftesbury Films)
- Elvira Kurt – Halifax Comedy Festival (CBC)
- John Cleese – Just for Laughs Gala Series (Just for Laughs Comedy Festival/Les Films Rozon)

== Best Ensemble Performance in a Comedy Program or Series ==
- Eric Peterson, Brent Butt, Lorne Cardinal, Gabrielle Miller, Janet Wright, Tara Spencer-Nairn, Fred Ewanuick, Nancy Robertson – Corner Gas – Gopher It (CTV Television Network/Prairie Pants Productions)
- Christopher Bolton, Stephen Amell, Oliver Becker, Inga Cadranel, Louis Di Bianco, Carlos Patricio Díaz, Gabriel Hogan, Mayko Nguyen, Rafael Petardi, Joe Pingue, Jeff Pustil, Philip Riccio, Maria Vacratsis, Jeremy Wright, Matt Gordon – Rent-a-Goalie – Episode 6 (Eggplant Picture & Sound, Fifth Ground Entertainment, Georgian Entertainment)
- Luba Goy, Don Ferguson, Roger Abbott, Alan Park, Jessica Holmes, Craig Lauzon, Penelope Corrin – Air Farce Live – AF 300 Live (CBC)
- Cathy Jones, Gavin Crawford, Mark Critch, Shaun Majumder – This Hour Has 22 Minutes – Episode 3 (Halifax Film Company/CBC)
- Rob deLeeuw, Kaela Bahrey, Karen Cliche, Ellen David, Trevor Hayes, Kathleen Robertson, Nobuya Shimamoto, Matt Silver, James A. Woods, Nicolas Wright – The Business – Check Please (Philms Pictures)
- Roman Danylo, Aurora Browne, Jennifer Goodhue, Albert Howell, Terry McGurrin, Jennifer Robertson, Ian Sirota, Winston Spear, Gavin Stephens – Comedy Inc. (SFA Productions)

== Best Performance or Host in a Variety Program or Series ==
- Lou Pomanti, Measha Brueggergosman, Kevin Breit – Words to Music: The Canadian Songwriters Hall of Fame 2007 – Both Sides Now (Cansong Productions)
- Shawn Byfield – The TO Variety Show – Toronto Dances (Insight Productions)
- Michael Bublé – Words to Music: The Canadian Songwriters Hall of Fame 2007 – How About You? (Cansong Productions)
- Measha Brueggergosman – 2007 East Coast Music Awards (East Coast Music Association/CBC)
- Mike Smith – CBC Winnipeg Comedy Festival (CBC)
- Alana Bridgewater, Kellylee Evans, Andrew Craig, Jackie Richardson, Sharon Riley, Chris Lowe – Gospel Christmas Celebration (CBC)

== Best Performance in a Performing Arts Program or Series ==
- Guillaume Côté – Moving To His Music: The Two Muses of Guillaume Côté
- Jeff Healey – Opening Night – Jeff Healey and Friends – CBC
- Chanti Wadge – Canticum Canticorum (Films Piché Ferrari)

== Best Performance in a Children’s or Youth Program or Series ==
- Shenae Grimes – Degrassi: The Next Generation – Eyes Without a Face (Bell Media/Epitome Pictures)
- Ishan Davé – renegadepress.com – Sullengirl16 (Vérité Films)
- Magda Apanowicz – renegadepress.com – Blackout (Vérité Films)
- Bronson Pelletier – renegadepress.com – The Third Wheel (Vérité Films)
- Alexz Johnson – Instant Star – I Fought the Law (DHX Media)

== Best Achievement in Casting ==
- Melissa Perry, Lynne Carrow – Intelligence – Dante’s Inferno (Haddock Entertainment)
- John Buchan – In God's Country (Shaftesbury Films)
- Jenny Lewis, Sara Kay – Rent-a-Goalie – Episode 6 (Eggplant Picture & Sound, Fifth Ground Entertainment, Georgian Entertainment)
- Susan Forrest, Sharon Forrest – Shades of Black: The Conrad Black Story (Screen Door)
- Deirdre Bowen – ReGenesis – A Spontaneous Moment (The Movie Network/Movie Central/Shaftesbury Films)

== Best News Anchor ==
- Gord Martineau – CityNews (Citytv)
- Ian Hanomansing – Canada Now (CBC)
- Kevin Newman – Global National (Global)

== Best Reportage ==
- Susan Ormiston – The National/CBC News – Reports from Afghanistan (CBC)
- Terry O'Keefe, Peter Silverman – CityNews (Citytv)
- Kevin Newman, Ben O’Hara-Byrne, Hannah Boudreau – Global National (Global)
- Brian Stewart – The National/CBC News (CBC)
- Terry Milewski – The National/CBC News (CBC)

== Best Host or Interviewer in a News Information Program or Series ==
- Gillian Findlay – the fifth estate – Luck of the Draw (CBC)
- Hana Gartner – the fifth estate – The Good Father (CBC)
- David Suzuki – The Nature of Things (CBC)
- Evan Solomon – CBC News Sunday Night (CBC)
- Steve Paikin – The Agenda (TVOntario)

== Best Host or Interviewer in a General/Human Interest or Talk Program or Series ==
- George Stroumboulopoulos – George Stroumboulopoulos Tonight (CBC)
- Wendy Mesley – Underdogs (CBC)
- Peter Mansbridge – Mansbridge One on One (CBC)
- Evan Solomon – Hot Type (CBC Newsworld)
- David Manning – Spam: The Documentary (Chocolate Box Entertainment)

== Best Host in a Lifestyle/Practical Information, or Performing Arts Program or Series ==
- Marilyn Denis – CityLine (Citytv)
- Kevin Brauch – The Thirsty Traveler – Mississippi/Louisiana: A River of Whiskey (Grasslands Entertainment)
- J.R. Digs – Be Real with JR Digs (Mountain Road Productions)
- Rick Mercer – Canada's Next Great Prime Minister (CBC)
- Bryan Baeumler – Disaster DIY (Si Entertainment)

== Best Host or Interviewer in a Sports Program or Sportscast ==
- Ron MacLean – Hockey Night in Canada (CBC Sports)
- James Duthie – NHL on TSN – Nov. 8/06 (TSN)
- Brian Williams – Bell Spirit of the Game – Own the Podium (TSN)

== Best Sports Play-by-Play or Analyst ==
- Bob Cole – Hockey Night in Canada – Stanley Cup Finals: Carolina @ Edmonton Game 3 (CBC Sports)
- Chris Cuthbert – CFL on TSN (TSN)
- Gord Miller – 2007 World Junior Ice Hockey Championships (TSN)

== Best Studio Sports Analyst ==
- Kelly Hrudey – Hockey Night in Canada (CBC Sports)
- Bob McKenzie – 2007 World Junior Ice Hockey Championships (TSN)
- Matt Dunigan – CFL on TSN (TSN)

== Best Game Analyst ==
- Pierre McGuire – NHL on TSN – Nov. 8/06, Dec. 12/06 (TSN)
- Greg Millen – Hockey Night in Canada (CBC Sports)
- Terry Leibel – BMO Nations' Cup at Spruce Meadows (CBC Sports)

== Best Photography in a Dramatic Program or Series ==
- Rene Ohashi – Shades of Black: The Conrad Black Story (Screen Door)
- Danny Nowak – Dragon Boys (Omnifilm Entertainment/Anchor Point Pictures/CBC)
- Norayr Kasper – Last Exit (Forum Films/Foundry Films)
- Thomas M. Harting – In God's Country (Shaftesbury Films)
- Norayr Kasper – Booky Makes Her Mark (Platt Productions/Shaftesbury Films/CBC)

== Best Photography in a Comedy, Variety, Performing Arts Program or Series ==
- Michael Spicer – Roxana (Mossanen Productions)
- Don Spence, Stan Barua – The TO Variety Show – Toronto Dances (Insight Productions)
- Henry Less – The Wilkinsons – Granddaddy Steve (Henry Less Productions)
- Marc Gadoury – Canticum Canticorum (Films Piché Ferrari)
- Luc Montpellier – Northern Town – Ivison (Tagish Lake Films)

== Best Photography in an Information Program or Series ==
- Henry Less – Made to Order – Dim Sum (Mercer Street Films)
- Colin Allison – the fifth estate (CBC)
- Jeff Cole – the fifth estate – Crime Pays (CBC)
- Blair Locke – The Heat with Mark McEwan – Inniskillin (General Purpose Pictures)
- Bert Savard – CBC News: Country Canada – The Town on Top of the World (CBC)
- Russell Gienapp – Pretty Dangerous (Summerhill Entertainment)

== Best Photography in a Documentary Program or Series ==
- Michael Grippo – Martyr Street (Bishari Films)
- Mark Ellam – EMPz 4 Life (TVOntario/At Home in the Hood Films)
- Michael Grippo – Faith Without Fear (NFB/90th Parallel Productions)
- David Ridgen – Mississippi Cold Case (CBC)
- Michael Rosas – Fashion File: Host Hunt (CBC)

== Best Visual Effects ==
- Mark Savela, Tom Brydon, Brenda Campbell, Debora Dunphy, Shannon Gurney, Andrew Karr, Todd Liddiard, Alec McClymont – Stargate Atlantis – No Man’s Land (Acme Shark Productions/Sony Pictures Television)
- Peter Evans, Darryl Couch, Chris Darlington, Mike Mombourquette, Michael Skiffington, John Vatcher, David Woodrow – Above and Beyond (Shaftesbury Films)
- Mohammad Ghorbankarimi, Laurence Cymet, Mark Driver, David Hedley, Sam Javanrouh, Filip Kicev, Paul Moyer, Leonardo Silva, Mahvash Tehrani – The Great Polar Bear Adventure (Optix Digital Pictures/Media Headquarters)

== Best Picture Editing in a Dramatic Program or Series ==
- Dominique Fortin – Answered by Fire (Beyond Simpson Le Mesurier/Muse Entertainment/Terra Rossa Pictures/Powercorp/The Paperback Company Films)
- Lara Mazur – Intelligence – Dante’s Inferno (Haddock Entertainment)
- Gordon Rempel – Whistler – Unearthed (Blueprint Entertainment/Boardwatch Productions/Uphill Productions/CTV)
- Jane Morrison – Dragon Boys (Omnifilm Entertainment/Anchor Point Pictures/CBC)
- Christopher Donaldson – Slings & Arrows – That Way Madness Lies (Rhombus Media)

== Best Picture Editing in a Comedy, Variety, Performing Arts Program or Series ==
- Philippe Ralet – Naked Josh – Footprints (Sextant Productions/Cirrus Communications)
- Todd Foster, Kendall Nowe, Ken Petersen – This Hour Has 22 Minutes – Episode 14.1 (Halifax Film Company/CBC)
- Randy Zimmer – The Wilkinsons – The Ad Man Cometh (Henry Less Productions)
- Dean Evans, Daisy Goldstein – Prank Patrol – Babysitter Blues (Apartment 11 Productions)
- Dona Noga – The Jane Show – Jane’s Addiction (Shaftesbury Films)

== Best Picture Editing in an Information Program or Series ==
- Tania White – the fifth estate – The Good Father (CBC)
- Loretta Hicks – the fifth estate – Lost in the Struggle (CBC)
- Tania White – Marketplace – How Not to Get Nailed (CBC)
- Pete Watson – War of the Wheels (Breakthrough Entertainment)
- David Hoffert – Party Mamas (Barna-Alper Productions)

== Best Picture Editing in a Documentary Program or Series ==
- Alison Ethier – Backspace
- Dan Caldwell – Music Rising (Frantic Films)
- Ted Wallace – UpRooted
- Dave Kazala – Worlds Collide: The Saga of Herschel Island (White Pine Pictures)
- Gil Tétreault – Tainted Evidence – Forensics on Trial (CBC)

== Best Production Design or Art Direction in a Dramatic Program or Series ==
- Phillip Connolly – 11 Cameras, Episode 6 (Henry Less Productions/Shaftesbury Films)
- Taavo Soodor – In God's Country (Shaftesbury Films)
- Rhonda Moscoe, Martha Sparrow – Roxana (Mossanen Productions)
- Ane Christensen, Pam Hall – Above and Beyond (Shaftesbury Films)
- Tim Bider – Shades of Black: The Conrad Black Story (Screen Door)

== Best Production Design or Art Direction in a Non-Dramatic Program or Series ==
- Callum MacLachlan – George Stroumboulopoulos Tonight – Prime Time Special (CBC)
- Glen Charles Landry – 2007 National Aboriginal Achievement Awards (CBC)
- Mark Patterson – 21st Gemini Awards (Academy of Canadian Cinema & Television/Global)
- James Hazell – The Next Great Chef – Arrival (Next Entertainment)
- Peter Faragher – Words to Music: The Canadian Songwriters Hall of Fame 2007 (Cansong Productions)

== Best Costume Design ==
- Debra Hanson – Roxana (Mossanen Productions)
- Ginette Magny – Bon Voyage, Part 2 (Box TV/Cité-Amérique)
- Lea Carlson – Slings & Arrows – That Way Madness Lies (Rhombus Media)
- Brandi Milbradt – The Festival (Philms Pictures)

== Best Achievement in Make-Up ==
- C.J. Goldman – Prank Patrol – The Office Boss (Apartment 11 Productions)
- Penny Lee, Karen Byers – This Hour Has 22 Minutes – Episode 14.1 (Halifax Film Company/CBC)
- Mary Monforte, Madeleine Russell – Roxana (Mossanen Productions)

== Best Sound in a Dramatic Program ==
- Mike Woroniuk, Christian T. Cooke, Robert Fletcher, Paul Germann, Barry Gilmore – Shades of Black: The Conrad Black Story (Screen Door)
- Harry Embry, Stephan Carrier, Ronayne Higginson, Dino Pigat, Jane Tattersall – Above and Beyond (Shaftesbury Films)
- Herwig Gayer, Mark Beck, Alan deGraaf, John Gare, Steve Hammond, Jonas Kuhnemann – In God's Country (Shaftesbury Films)

== Best Sound in a Dramatic Series ==
- Miguel Nunes, Gina Mueller, Harley Paul, Jeff Shannon, Craig Stauffer – Intelligence – Down But Not Out (Haddock Entertainment)
- Steve Munro, Michael Baskerville, Danielle McBride, Bill McMillan, Virginia Storey, Paul Williamson – Degrassi: The Next Generation – Here Comes Your Man (Bell Media/Epitome Pictures)
- Dan Sexton, Richard Calistan, Steve Foster, Doug Johnston, Sid Lieberman, Paul Shubat – Falcon Beach – Turn Card (Insight Productions/Original Pictures)
- John Gare, Dan Daniels, Alan DeGraaf, Steve Hammond, Joe Mancuso, Dan Sexton – ReGenesis – A Spontaneous Moment (The Movie Network/Movie Central/Shaftesbury Films)
- Lou Solakofski, Sue Conley, Susan Fairbairn, Robert Fletcher, Ronayne Higginson, Sid Lieberman – Slings & Arrows – The Promised End (Rhombus Media)

== Best Sound in a Comedy, Variety, or Performing Arts Program or Series ==
- Peter Hamilton, Richard Spence-Thomas, Danny Greenspoon, Jamie Sulek, Gary Vaughan – Gospel Challenge (Riddle Films)
- Ian Dunbar, Peter Campbell, Doug Doctor, Ric Jurgens, Jeff Wolpert – Words to Music: The Canadian Songwriters Hall of Fame 2007 (Cansong Productions)
- Roberta Capretta, Bill Baker, Brian Newby, Tim O’Connell – Jeff Ltd. – Auto Fish 9000 (CTV/S&S Productions/Dufferin Gate Productions/Seymour & From Productions 2/The Comedy Network)
- Lou Solakofski, David Rose, Kirk Lynds, Steve Hammond, Sanjay Mehta – Mozartballs (Rhombus Media)
- Marc Parizeau – Gospel Christmas Celebration (CBC)

== Best Sound in an Information/Documentary Program or Series ==
- Ric Jurgens, Amir Boverman – The Lost Tomb of Jesus (Eggplant Picture & Sound)
- Ao Loo, Jakob Thiesen, Ian Rodness, Russ Walker – The Nature of Things – Tsepong: A Clinic Called Hope (CBC)
- Damian Kearns, Larry Kent, Joe Passaretti – the fifth estate – Road Warriors (CBC)
- Brian Eimer, J.R. Fountain – Digging up the Trenches (History Channel)
- Russ Walker, Larry MacDonald, Jakob Thiesen, Ian Rodness – Worlds Collide: The Saga of Herschel Island (White Pine Pictures)

== Best Original Music Score for a Program or Miniseries ==
- Christopher Dedrick – The Great Polar Bear Adventure (Optix Digital Pictures/Media Headquarters)
- Tim McCauley – Dragon Boys (Omnifilm Entertainment/Anchor Point Pictures/CBC)
- Michel Corriveau – Answered by Fire (Beyond Simpson Le Mesurier/Muse Entertainment/Terra Rossa Pictures/Powercorp/The Paperback Company Films)
- Gary Koftinoff – Spirit Bear: The Simon Jackson Story (Screen Door)
- Jonathan Goldsmith – Above and Beyond (Shaftesbury Films)

== Best Original Music Score for a Dramatic Series ==
- Robert Carli – Ghostly Encounters – Violent in Life, Violent in Death (Platt Productions)
- Jim McGrath – Degrassi: The Next Generation – What's It Feel Like To Be A Ghost? (Bell Media/Epitome Pictures)
- Schaun Tozer – Intelligence – Down But Not Out (Haddock Entertainment)
- Tom Third – ReGenesis – Strangers in the Night (The Movie Network/Movie Central/Shaftesbury Films)
- Ron Sures – Slings & Arrows – The Promised End (Rhombus Media)

== Best Original Music Score for a Documentary Program or Series ==
- Aaron Davis, John Lang – The Nature of Things – Everyday Einstein (CBC)
- Jorane – Cirque du Soleil: Lovesick (Galafilm/Créations Musca)
- Jamie Alcorn – Cottonland (NFB)
- David Wall – Martyr Street (Bishari Films)
- Lance Neveu – The Great War: The Complete History of WWI (Galafilm)
- Eric Robertson, Claude Desjardins – Hockey: A People's History – A Simple Game (CBC)

== Best Original Music Score for an Animated Program or Series ==
- Paul Intson – Skyland – Mogura (Method Animation/9 Story Entertainment)
- Terry Tompkins, Steve D'Angelo – The Naughty Naughty Pets (Decode Entertainment/C.O.R.E.)
- Michael Richard Plowman – Edgar & Ellen – Crushed (Studio B Productions, Bardel Entertainment, Star Farm Productions, Nicktoons)
- Paul Inston – Grossology – The Insider (Nelvana)
- Steve London – What It's Like Being Alone – Lucy, Lucy (CBC)

== Special awards ==
- Gordon Sinclair Award for Broadcast Journalism – Tony Burman
- Earle Grey Award – Don Harron
- Academy Achievement Award – John Kastner
- Canada Award: Zarqa Nawaz, Mary Darling, Clark Donnelly, Susan Alexander, Michael Snook – Little Mosque on the Prairie
- Margaret Collier Award: Joy Simons-Newall, Lilly Barnes, Chris Clark, Susan Marcus – Mr. Dressup
- Gemini Award for Most Popular Website Competition: Suzanne French, Shane Kinnear, Jarrett Sherman – Life with Derek
- Gemini Humanitarian Award – Tom Jackson
