= Tutu Much =

- Directed by: Elise Swerhone
- Produced by: Merit Jensen Carr; Vonnie Von Helmolt
- Cinematography: Keith Eidse; Charles Konowal
- Edited by: Brad Caslor
- Music by: Shawn Pierce
- Release date: January 17, 2010
- Running time: 83 minutes
- Country: Canada
- Language: English

Tutu Much, stylised as TuTuMUCH, is a 2010 Canadian documentary film that focuses on the 9- to 12-year-old entering class of the Royal Winnipeg Ballet's Summer School Program.

It is produced by Ballet Girls Inc, a co-production between Merit Motion Pictures and Vonnie VON HELMOLT Films. It is directed by Elise Swerhone.

== Synopsis ==
The Royal Winnipeg Ballet's Summer School Program is the first step to beginning a career as a professional ballet dancer. But that doesn't mean that it's easy. 9 young girls come from all over the world to enter the program, knowing that if they don't get in by a certain age, it will be far too late to become a ballerina. A dancer can try her hardest but not make it into the next stage just based on her physical musculature. Those that do make it face a difficult decision - spend their childhood and teen years away from their families and focusing on the daily strains of ballet training, or live as a normal teenager...
