= Out in the Open =

Out in the Open may refer to:

- Out in the Open, a play by Jonathan Harvey
- Out in the Open (radio show), a Canadian public radio program (2016-2020)
- "Out in the Open" (renegadepress.com), an episode of the television series renegadepress.com
- Out in the Open, an album by Steep Canyon Rangers
- "Out in the Open", a song by Amy Grant from Simple Things
- "Out in the Open", a song by My Morning Jacket from Is
