= Dinosapien =

British children's television series

- Genre: Fantasy; Science fiction
- Starring: Brittney Wilson; Bronson Pelletier; MacKenzie Porter; Jeffrey Watson; Suzanna Hamilton; James Coombes; Alexandra Gingras; Brendan Meyer; Dean Manywounds
- Composer: Rob Lord
- Countries of origin: United Kingdom; Canada
- Original language: English
- No. of seasons: 1
- No. of episodes: 15

Production
- Executive producers: Rick Siggelkow; Mark Young; Arnie Zipursky; Tom Cox; Martha Ripp; Simon Nelson
- Producers: Jim Corston; Jordy Randall
- Editor: Peter Light
- Camera setup: Carey Toner
- Running time: 23 minutes
- Production companies: CCI Entertainment; BBC Worldwide

Original release
- Network: BBC Kids (Canada); Discovery Kids (United States); CBBC Channel (United Kingdom)
- Release: March 24 – June 30, 2007

Dinosapien is a 15-episode children's television program. The series is a co-production between BBC Worldwide and CCI Entertainment, in association with BBC Kids, Discovery Kids and CBBC.

Overall 15 episodes were made, each 21 and half minutes long (30 minutes total when factoring in commercials). The series is filmed in Bragg Creek, Alberta. The program made its debut on March 24, 2007, on Discovery Kids and CBBC. The series ended on June 30, 2007. Each program contains around six minutes of CGI. Brittney Wilson stars as Lauren Slayton, Suzanna Hamilton as Dr. Slayton and James Coombes as Dr. Aikens.

Sci-fi veteran David Winning directed the pilot and first three episodes and Brendan Sheppard, known for his work on Doctor Who DVDs, directed five episodes. Marc Lougee, veteran of several award-winning animated series (including MTV's Celebrity Deathmatch and the CBC's What It's Like Being Alone) directed CG animation and Visual Effects/2nd unit for the series.

== Premise ==
The program focuses on what would happen if dinosaurs had continued to exist and evolve into more intelligent beings (Lauren mentions in the opening credits "Everyone thinks dinosaurs are extinct, but what if they're wrong?"). It is set at Dinosaur Explorer Camp, a dinosaur-themed summer camp in Canada, where Dr. Hillary Slayton lives with her teenage daughter Lauren. Dr Slayton's husband Alan mysteriously disappeared on a fossil expedition into the Badlands and her daughter hasn't come to terms with his disappearance. Lauren is, however, the first human to encounter one of the evolved dinosaurs, which she eventually gets to know. Throughout the series, Dr. Slayton befriends Dr. Aikens (who later plans to destroy the evolved dinosaurs out of fear that they would try to eliminate the human race and reclaim the Earth) and Lauren makes many friends before finding out more about dinosaurs and her father's disappearance.

== Cast ==
- Brittney Wilson as Lauren Slayton
- Bronson Pelletier as Kit Whitefeather
- MacKenzie Porter as Courtney
- Jeffrey Watson as Chris Langhorn
- Suzanna Hamilton as Dr. Hilary Slayton
- James Coombes as Dr. Clive Aikens
- Alexandra Gingras as Danny Ort
- Brendan Meyer as Nelson Ort
- Dean Manywounds as Ten Bears

=== Dinosaurs ===
Eno - A 6-foot-tall (1.8 m) theropod teenage dinosaur who is pale green with red and yellow stripes along his back, has a grey underbelly, pheasant-like feathers on the head (like human hair) and tail, yellow hawk-like forward eyes, feet like a dromaeosaur, and a short snout. In fact, Lauren confirmed that Eno's kind evolved from the species Dromaeosaurus. Like a parrot, Eno can copy and use words almost in context, but despite his intelligence, he has a four-year-old child's grammar when he talks. Eno is known to make squawking sounds similar to that of a bird, and quite sensitive to high-pitched sounds; they have a tendency to scare and drive him away. He is also known for climbing trees, but only for hiding or escaping. Judging from an incident when Eno was seen eating hot dogs and leaves, he is possibly omnivorous.

The Diggers - Two rather goofy bipedal cross-between Prenocephale and Pinacosaurus, but with long grasping arms like a Dromaeosaur. Their species is described as "Ornithosapien" by Danny and Nelson in episode 12. They are insectivores. They are Eno's enemies, and they chase him persistently. They also chase everyone else and seem just evil. They can make things and use tools. They have a weakness though; they can be disabled temporarily by very bright lights (shown by nictitating eyelids). Lauren has nicknamed them Green Eyes (the male) and Cerepta (the female). The Diggers are buried in an avalanche triggered by the dynamite. While Dr. Aikens survived, the final fate of the Diggers was left ambiguous on-screen. Since Cerepta is female and the leader of the duo, it might hint that in their species the females are most dominant.

== Episodes ==
No.	Title	Directed by	Written by	Original release date
1	"Dawn of the Dinosaur"	David Winning	Jeff Biederman; Story by : Jeff Biederman & Jeff F. King	March 24, 2007
An evolved dromaeosaur dinosaur named Eno escapes from an underground world where the last remaining dinosaurs have taken refuge from humans. While he's being hunted by two predatory dinosaurs called the Diggers, Eno encounters fifteen-year-old Lauren Slayton, who is enrolled at Dino Adventure Camp as a helper with her friends that seem to have known each other before the series has started. She's terrified and runs away, but leaves behind the cherished locket that her missing father had given her.
2	"Without a Paddle"	David Winning	Jeff Biederman	March 31, 2007
Lauren and Courtney get lost in the woods while searching for Lauren's locket, and they are chased by the Diggers until Eno fights off the deadly dinosaurs and saves the girls. Chris and Kit arrive to help them, and so does the mysterious Dr. Aikens who begins asking some suspicious sounding questions.
3	"Monster in the Woods"	David Winning	Pat Connolly	April 7, 2007
Eno gives Lauren back the locket from her father and she gives him the name 'Eno', but he becomes frightened and disappears into the woods. Lauren follows Eno but comes upon the Diggers and she heroically fends them off and keeps the vicious dinosaurs from harming other campers. Meanwhile, Nelson and Danielle find one of Eno's footprints and tell Dr. Aikens, who recruits them to spy on the counselors.
4	"Critters"	David Winning	David Richard-Fox	April 14, 2007
Lauren and Kit go to find Eno, but change their plans when a grizzly bear begins to stalk them. At the same time, Eno discovers that the Diggers have set up their headquarters in an abandoned coal mine, where they nearly trap him. Eno escapes and returns to his wilderness hideout in time to save Lauren and Kit from the fearsome grizzly. Back at camp, Courtney and Chris do battle with a skunk ...and lose.
5	"Trapped"	Dean Bennett	Jeff F. King	April 21, 2007
Lauren hopes that a medicine man named Ten Bears (Kit's Uncle) may hold the secret to her father's disappearance and the arrival of the dinosaurs. But instead of offering help, Ten Bears warns them to stay away from the dinosaurs, which he calls the "Unktehi", a dangerous creature from Native mythology. Elsewhere, Eno has been trapped by poachers. Lauren and Kit distract the poachers and free him, but now Eno is afraid of humans and he turns on Lauren before escaping into the woods.
6	"Camp Visitors"	Dean Bennett	Jeff Biederman	April 28, 2007
Lauren tries to befriend Eno by offering him some hot dogs which doesn't work. Later, she discovers that her father wrote The DinoSapien Theory about intelligent dinosaurs like Eno and the Diggers. Meanwhile, Eno is still hungry and encounters Courtney with a bowl of hot dogs in the woods. Little does she know, Danielle and Nelson have planted a "bug" on Courtney, and they overhear the name "Eno". The kids pass along this "secret password" to Dr. Aikens who becomes surprisingly intrigued.
7	"No Place Like Home"	Dean Bennett	Pat Connolly	May 5, 2007
Eno tries to communicate with Lauren but she can't understand him. Out in the Badlands, Ten Bears confronts the Diggers speaking his native Sioux, a language the dinosaurs understand. Back at camp, Nelson is feeling homesick. While helping Nelson, Lauren realizes what Eno was trying to tell her.
8	"Electricity"	Brendan Sheppard	Thérèse Beaupré	May 12, 2007
Eno discovers the destructive power of lightning and he sets out to harness it. His search for tools brings him into camp on the day of the Talent Show. Nearly discovered by Dr. Aikens, he takes cover. Lauren realizes she must smuggle him out of the camp and convinces Courtney to ham it up in the Talent Show to distract everyone. Safely back in the woods, Eno tests his "Lightning Collector". But we don't know why he has built it or what he wants to use it for.
9	"Dinohunt"	Brendan Sheppard	Jeff F. King	May 19, 2007
While everyone goes on a camping trip, Dr. Aikens sets out on a hunt for Eno with a tranquilizer gun. The camping trip goes badly and tensions are running high between the counselors. The Diggers catch the scent of Dr. Aikens and stalk him, fascinated by his weapon. Lauren foils Dr. Aikens quest and believes Eno is safe for now ... except no one knows that the tranquilizer gun is now in the hands of the Diggers.
10	"The Underworld"	Brendan Sheppard	Pat Connolly	May 26, 2007
Just when Lauren discovers that Eno knows her missing father's name, the Diggers capture her and take her deep into the coal mines. Once she is discovered missing, Courtney recruits Nelson and Danielle to help guide Kit and Eno to the hidden entrance of the coal mine. Kit and Eno find Lauren but fall into the Diggers' trap. Eno tries to fight off the Diggers but the scuffle causes the mine to collapse and they don't all make it out on time.
11	"Rescue"	Brendan Sheppard	Pat Connolly	June 2, 2007
While searching for Eno in the woods, Lauren and Kit are nearly attacked by the Diggers. They're saved at the last minute by a bright shaft of light which temporarily repels the evil dinosaurs, causing Lauren and Kit to wonder who their mysterious protector is. Meanwhile, Dr. Aikens steals Danielle and Nelson's prize from the scavenger hunt as he believes it's actual proof that dinosaurs are still alive.
12	"The Masquerade"	Brendan Sheppard	Pat Connolly	June 9, 2007
Lauren decides to tell her mother about Eno to keep him from being captured by Dr. Aikens, or discovered by Nelson and Danielle. Courtney has her own solution to thwart off the kids curiosity. Kit takes Eno to the Badlands where he will be safe, but Eno runs away so he can be with Lauren. Chris finds out the hard way that Lauren was telling the truth about dinosaurs when he's captured by the Diggers.
13	"The Gate Keeper"	Pat Williams	Thérèse Beaupré	June 16, 2007
Eno has caught a cold and without any human anti-bodies, he's in danger of dying. Lauren and Kit track him to the Badlands, and discover that Ten Bears is going to help them find a cure. Back at camp, Courtney breaks up a food fight but she loses Lauren's dinosaur journal. Everything Lauren knows about Eno is in the journal and now it has fallen into dangerous hands.
14	"Saving Eno"	Pat Williams	Thérèse Beaupré	June 23, 2007
Dr. Aikens has teamed up with the poachers to track down Eno. Lauren and Kit are hiding Eno and call Chris and Courtney for help. But Courtney and Chris are intercepted by the Diggers. After a wild chase, Dr. Aikens captures Eno. Little does Aikens know who is hiding in the back of his truck.
15	"The Thunderbird"	Pat Williams	Thérèse Beaupré	June 30, 2007
Dr. Aikens wants to use Eno as bait to destroy the dinosaurs as they emerge from their caves in the Badlands. Lauren is able to locate Eno with Nelson and Danielle's help. Undeterred, Dr. Aikens continues to stuff dynamite into the caves, but the Diggers arrive and chase him off. When a bolt of lightning strikes, the Thunderbird myth Ten Bears had foretold becomes a reality. Will this make Lauren and Eno's dreams come true?

== Broadcast ==
Dinosapien first aired as a weekly series on Saturdays on BBC Kids in Canada from March 24 to June 30, 2007. This was the basis of its original run.

The series was then aired on CBBC Channel in the United Kingdom beginning May 10, 2007. This was started by the first two episodes back-to-back, followed by a weekly basis of one episode each week on Thursdays. The finale aired on August 9, 2007. The series was made available on the network until October 14, 2010.

In the United States, Dinosapien premiered from July 7 to August 11, 2007, as a miniseries event on Discovery Kids for its original run. The premiere began on Saturdays with the first four episodes aired back-to-back in a two-hour block, followed by four one-hour blocks of two episodes each. The final three episodes were aired in a block of one hour and thirty minutes. The series also briefly aired in reruns on The Hub until March 24, 2012.
