= Recreating Eden =

- Genre: Lifestyle - Gardening
- Created by: Merit Jensen Carr; Donna Gall
- Narrated by: Bonnie Dickie
- Theme music composer: Michael Richard Plowman; Shawn Pierce
- Country of origin: Canada
- Original language: English
- No. of seasons: 5
- No. of episodes: 65

Production
- Executive producer: Merit Jensen Carr
- Producers: Joan Jenkinson; Barry Floc'h; Donna Gall; David M Fox; Sandra Moore

Original release
- Network: HGTV(Canada Seasons 1-2); VisionTV (Canada); TVO (Canada); Knowledge (Canada); TéléMaison (France); Canal+ Poland; UKTV Gardens
- Release: 2002 – 2008

Recreating Eden is a Canadian lifestyle and gardening television documentary program. Its aim is to examine the physical, mental, and spiritual healing effects that gardens have on their keepers

== History ==
Recreating Eden was originally broadcast on HGTV Canada in 2002, but after two seasons was not renewed. It was then picked up by VisionTV for an additional three seasons. As of 2010, the series has not been renewed for a sixth season.

== Community Garden Initiative ==
VisionTV and Recreating Eden teamed up in 2007 to create the Community Garden Initiative, a project to fund green communities in cities and towns across Canada. The program ran successfully for two years, funding six projects.

=== 2007 recipients ===
- The Youth Garden in Dufferin Grove Park organized by FoodShare Toronto.
- The Garden of Lite in Winnipeg.
- The Julien Project in Guelph.

=== 2008 recipients ===
- Greenest City in Toronto.
- North Central Community Garden in Regina.
- Bayview Memorial Park Stream Restoration in the township of Oro-Medonte.
