= Rene Ohashi =

Canadian cinematographer

Rene Ohashi ASC, CSC
- Occupation: Cinematographer

Rene Ohashi is a Canadian cinematographer living in Toronto, Ontario, Canada. His career spanned more than 25 years. Ohashi has been nominated for over 30 awards, winning 16. His projects include Anne of Green Gables, The Wonder Years, To Catch a Killer, Gold Fever and Shades of Black: The Conrad Black Story.

Rene Ohashi has also shot thousands of commercials for national brands including: American Express, General Motors, New York Health Department, Nissan, CMA, H&R Block, Campbell's, Harvey's, Kraft, Maple Leaf Foods, Michelina and Labatt. He is Director of Photography for Sesler Company.

== Filmography ==
Year	Title	Role	Notes
2016	Wait Till Helen Comes		
2015	Forsaken		
2014	Clementine		
2013	Nikita	2010 to 2013	
2011	InSecurity		
2011	Faces in the Crowd		
2009	Jesse Stone: Thin Ice	Television film	
2009	Eleventh Hour	Television series	6 episodes 2008-2009
2007	Jesse Stone: Sea Change	Television film	
2007	Kidnapped	Television series	5 episodes, 2006–2007
2006	Shades of Black: The Conrad Black Story	Television film	
2006	Above and Beyond	TV miniseries	
2005	Robert B. Parker's Stone Cold	Television film	
2004	Saint Ralph		
2003	Shattered City: The Halifax Explosion	Television film	
2003	Highwaymen		
2002	They		
2001	Wild Iris	Television film	
2001	Club Land	Television film	
2001	Great Performances	1 episode	
2000	The Crossing	Television film	
1999	Water Damage		
1999	Gold Fever		
1999	Jerzy Has a Dream		
1997	The Arrow	Television film	
1995	Kissinger and Nixon		
1995	The War Between Us		
1995	Rent-a-Kid	Television film	
1994	Thicker Than Blood: The Larry McLinden Story		
1993	La Florida		
1993	The Diviners		
1992	To Catch a Killer		
1992	The Sound and the Silence		
1991	John Wyre: Drawing on Sound		
1990	Deep Sleep		
1989	Millennium		
1989	Where the Spirit Lives		
1989	A Moving Picture		
1988	Almost Grown	1 episode	
1988	Hot Paint	Television film	
1988	The Wonder Years	Television series	
1988	Shadow Dancing		

== Awards ==
=== Canadian Society of Cinematographers Awards ===
- 2007 won the Best Cinematography in TV Series for: Kidnapped Special Delivery episode (2006)
- 2003 won the Best Cinematography in Theatrical Feature for: They (2002)
- 2002 won the Best Cinematography in TV Drama for: Club Land (2001) (TV)
- 1997 won the Best Cinematography in TV Drama for: The Arrow (1997) (TV)
- 1990 won the Best Cinematography in Theatrical Feature for: Millennium (1989)
- 1989 won the Best Cinematography in Theatrical Feature for: Shadow Dancing (1988)

=== American Society of Cinematographers, USA ===
- 2001 won the Outstanding Achievement in Cinematography in Movies of the Week/Mini-Series'/Pilot for Cable or Pay TV for: The Crossing (2000) (TV)

=== Gemini Awards ===
- 2007 won the Best Photography in a Dramatic Program or Series for: Shades of Black: The Conrad Black Story (2006) (TV)
- 2004 won the Best Photography in a Dramatic Program or Series for: Shattered City: The Halifax Explosion (2003) (TV)
- 2001 won the Best Photography in a Comedy, Variety or Performing Arts Program or Series for: Great Performances (1972) for the episode "Don Giovanni Unmasked".
- 1998 won the Best Photography in a Dramatic Program or Series award for: The Arrow (1997) (TV)
- 1995 won the Best Photography in a Dramatic Program or Series for: Race to Freedom: The Underground Railroad (1994) (TV)
- 1994 won the Best Photography in a Dramatic Program or Series for: The Diviners (1993) (TV)
- 1993 won the Best Photography in a Dramatic Program or Series for: The Sound and the Silence (1992) (TV)
- 1987 won the Best Photography in a Dramatic Program or Series for: The Truth About Alex (1986) (TV)
- 1986 won the Best Photography in a Dramatic Program or Series for: Anne of Green Gables (1985) (TV)
