= Starship Invasions =

- Theatrical release poster
- Directed by: Ed Hunt
- Written by: Ed Hunt
- Produced by: Norman Glick; Ed Hunt; Ken Gord
- Starring: Robert Vaughn; Christopher Lee
- Cinematography: Mark Irwin
- Edited by: Millie Moore; Ruth Hope
- Music by: Gil Mellé
- Production company: Hal Roach Studios
- Distributed by: Warner Bros. Pictures
- Release dates: 14 October 1977 (United States); 25 November 1977 (Toronto)
- Running time: 89 minutes
- Country: Canada
- Language: English
- Budget: $1 million

Starship Invasions is a 1977 Canadian science fiction film directed, produced and written by Ed Hunt and filmed in Toronto, Ontario. It was re-released in the United Kingdom as Project Genocide.

== Plot ==
The plot concerns the black-clad Legion of the Winged Serpent, a rogue group of human-like telepathic aliens led by Captain Rameses. The Legion's home planet Alpha in the Orion constellation is about to be destroyed in the imminent supernova of its star. Rameses is leading a small force of flying saucers (Note: Modelled on Paul Trent's photos.) to Earth to examine its suitability for their race. Performing several alien abductions, they discover they are descendants of transplanted humans, and the Earth is perfect for them. They cover their tracks using a device that causes the abductees to commit suicide. They plan to use a larger version of the device so that everyone on Earth will kill themselves so the Alphans can take over.

Opposing any attempt to interfere with less-developed planets is the Intergalactic League of Races, a highly advanced group of bald, big-headed aliens from Zeta Reticuli. The League operates a base on Earth in a pyramid hidden beneath the ocean. Rameses lands at the base pretending to be a friendly researcher, and the League reminds him that under the Galactic Treaty he is to have no contact with humans. While taking a tour of the base he is disturbed to see a television broadcast featuring human UFO expert and astronomer Professor Allan Duncan discussing Rameses' abductions. He laughs it off and indulges in the local entertainment.

Rameses' crew sabotages one of the League's three saucers, which is later shot down when approaching a United States Army base. The League sends its two remaining saucers to investigate. When they leave, Rameses and his crew kill everyone left in the base and destroy their robots. One of the League saucers returns to the base and attempts to regain control, but its crew is killed in a shootout. Rameses sends his ship to attack the remaining League saucer, but it loses the battle and the Serpent ship is destroyed. Rameses calls in reinforcements who have been hiding behind the Moon, ordering them to hunt down the surviving League ship. Rameses also deploys the "extermination device". The United States armed forces discover it in orbit, but are powerless to prevent the ensuing suicide epidemic.

The surviving League ship has suffered minor computer damage, and contacts Duncan for assistance. He enlists the help of his friend Malcolm, a computer expert, who repairs the ship using parts picked up in downtown Toronto. They are discovered shortly after taking off and are intercepted by one of the Serpent ships, but they shoot it down and it crashes into First Canadian Place. They refuel the ship and leave Earth in an attempt to enlist the help of other League ships. Malcolm's improvised repairs burn out shortly past the Moon, so Duncan's knowledge of the masses of the planets is put to use by Malcolm's pocket calculator to plot their course to the outer Solar System.

The ship successfully reaches a League squadron, and they set out to attack the Legion. Rameses uses the computer in the League base to calculate superior strategies and begins to destroy the League ships. One of the robots in the base (Note: Patterned on the aliens from the Pascagoula Abduction) is only damaged, not destroyed, and re-takes command. He causes the extermination unit to destroy itself, and then directs Rameses' ships to collide with each other. With his fleet destroyed and the super-weapon eliminated, there is no hope for Rameses. When he discovers his sun has gone supernova during the battle, he crashes his ship into the Moon.

During the action, the extermination unit had passed over Toronto, causing Duncan's wife to slash her wrists. The League races to Duncan's home and they easily revive her.

== Cast ==
- Robert Vaughn as Professor Allan Duncan
- Christopher Lee as Captain Rameses
- Daniel Pilon as Anaxi
- Tiiu Leek as Phi
- Helen Shaver as Betty Duncan
- Henry Ramer as Malcolm
- Victoria Johnson as Gazeth
- Doreen Lipson as Dorothy
- Kate Parr as Diane Duncan
- Sherri Ross as Sagnac
- Linda Rennhofer as Joan
- Richard Fitzpatrick as Joe
- Ted Turner as Zhender
- Sean McCann as Carl
- Bob Warner as an Air Force General
- Kurt Schiegl as Rudi

== Production and release ==
The film had to be retitled twice. It originally was titled War of the Aliens, which resembled the 1977 blockbuster Star Wars. The title was changed to Alien Encounter, which resembled the 1977 blockbuster Close Encounters of the Third Kind. Hal Roach Studios producers Earl A. Glick and Norman Glick bankrolled the production with $1 million. Many elements of the film, including the design of the robots and the winged serpent emblem the black-clad villains wear, are taken from UFO accounts.

Starship Invasions was released in VHS format by Warner Home Video. It was also released in 1987 on video in the United Kingdom by Krypton Force under the title Project Genocide.

Its French-language title was L'invasion des soucoupes volantes.

== Critical reception ==
From contemporary reviews, Globe and Mail reviewer Robert Martin panned Starship Invasions, likening the film to "those dubbed Japanese movies usually seen on Saturday afternoon television". John Duvoli of The Evening News called it a "poor imitation" of previous science fiction films. Janet Maslin of The New York Times wrote that the film is too low budget and derivative to even appeal to science fiction fans. Variety described the film as a "cinematic curio", stating that it was a "1970s replica of those hoaky old Republic sci-fi pix of the 1940s, apparently made in complete sincerity by young director Ed Hunt with none of the phony campiness that often haunts such recreations." In his annual publication "TV Movies," Leonard Maltin gives the film 1 1/2 out of four stars, stating the film has "the worst special effects since 'Plan 9 From Outer Space.'"
