= The Crossing (2000 film) =

2000 film directed by Robert Harmon

- DVD cover
- Genre: Historical drama
- Based on: The Crossing by Howard Fast
- Written by: Howard Fast
- Directed by: Robert Harmon
- Starring: Jeff Daniels; Roger Rees; Sebastian Roché; Steven McCarthy
- Music by: Gary Chang
- Country of origin: United States
- Original language: English German

Production
- Executive producers: Rick Rosenberg; Bob Christiansen
- Producer: David Coatsworth
- Cinematography: Rene Ohashi
- Editor: Zach Staenberg
- Running time: 89 minutes
- Production companies: Chris/Rose Productions; Columbia TriStar Television; A&E Television Networks

Original release
- Network: A&E
- Release: January 10, 2000

The Crossing is a 2000 American television historical drama film about George Washington's crossing of the Delaware River and the Battle of Trenton. Directed by Robert Harmon and adapted by Howard Fast from his novel of the same name, the film stars Jeff Daniels as George Washington. Also appearing are Roger Rees as Hugh Mercer, Sebastian Roché as John Glover, and Steven McCarthy as Alexander Hamilton. The film premiered on A&E on January 10, 2000.

== Plot ==
After repeated defeats during the American Revolutionary War's campaign of 1776, the Continental Army retreats across New Jersey. In the prior six months, they have lost New York City and been chased through New Jersey by the British, and 90 percent of their troops have been killed, taken prisoner, or have deserted.

After the army narrowly escapes across the Delaware River to the Pennsylvania shore, it is in possession of the only boats of any use on that stretch of the Delaware, obtaining it a reprieve from further pursuit until the river freezes, which will allow the British to cross from New Jersey and capture Philadelphia. General Hugh Mercer reminds General George Washington, the commander of the Continental Army, that their supplies of food, medicine, ammunition and winter clothing are dangerously low.

Realizing that the Revolution will collapse unless he finds a solution, Washington conceives a plan to cross back across the Delaware and conduct a surprise attack on the Hessian garrison at Trenton. Washington queries Colonel John Glover, an experienced mariner from Marblehead, Massachusetts whose troops have previously effected Continental evacuations by boat, about the feasibility of the plan. Glover calls the task of moving Washington’s troops across the river in one night during freezing weather impossible, but says it must be done to save the Revolution, so his men and he will do it.

Washington proposes the plan to his staff and subordinate commanders and General Horatio Gates picks it apart, then suggests that Washington relinquish his command. Washington orders Gates to be silent and tells Alexander Hamilton to escort Gates out of camp at gunpoint. After Gates has left, the group laughs, but Washington and Glover silence them by reiterating the seriousness of the situation and the risks associated with the battle plan. On Christmas night, the Hessians will be feasting and drinking, so early on the following morning the Continentals will attack while the Hessians are tired and sluggish. The officers have only a few days to prepare their troops and weapons, and to maintain the element of surprise the soldiers are told no more than necessary.

Despite low morale, fatigue and bad winter weather, Washington lifts his soldiers' spirits and Glover supervises the crossing from the Pennsylvania side of the Delaware to the New Jersey side on the night of December 25–26, 1776. The crossing is completed on the morning of December 26, though it is behind schedule and the sun has risen, increasing the risk that the operation will be discovered. Washington's troops march to Trenton and attack at eight o'clock. They achieve a stunning victory over the surprised Hessians and capture almost the entire garrison.

== Main cast ==
- Jeff Daniels as Gen. George Washington
- Roger Rees as Gen. Hugh Mercer
- Sebastian Roché as Col. John Glover
- Steven McCarthy as Alexander Hamilton
- John Henry Canavan as Gen. Henry Knox
- Ned Vukovic as William Alexander, Lord Stirling
- David Ferry as Gen. Nathanael Greene
- Nigel Bennett as Gen. Horatio Gates
- Karl Pruner as Gen. John Sullivan
- Duncan McLeod as Williams
- Andrew Kraulis as Billy
- Kelly Harms as Tommy
- Jonathan Watton as Cadman
- Kris Holden-Ried as Capt. Heineman
- Julian Richings as McKenzie
- James Kidnie as Col. Johann Rall

== Production ==
Filming took place in April and May 1999, in Toronto.

== Anachronisms and errors ==
The Crossing contains several minor errors and historical anachronisms. Among them are that in December 1776, Gates was not removed from camp at gunpoint. In addition, at the time in which the film is set, Alexander Hamilton had not yet joined Washington's staff. During the Battle of Trenton, Hamilton commanded an artillery battery that fired from a high point near the center of town, which prevented the Hessians from organizing a defense or escaping.

Details presented during the closing credits claim that none of Washington's men were killed or wounded. In fact, two Continental soldiers froze to death during the march and five were wounded during the attack, including James Monroe.

== Awards ==
The Crossing won a Peabody Award for excellence in 2000. Cinematographer Rene Ohashi also won the 2001 ASC Award for Outstanding Achievement in Cinematography in Movies of the Week/Mini-Series/Pilot, and the film's sound team was nominated for an Emmy for Outstanding Sound Editing for a Miniseries, Movie or a Special.

== See also ==
- List of films about the American Revolution
- List of television series and miniseries about the American Revolution
- Cultural depictions of George Washington
