= Merit Motion Pictures =

Canadian independent documentary film and television production company

- Type: Private
- Industry: Film and television production
- Founded: 1988
- Founder: Merit Jensen Carr
- Headquarters: 248 Princess Street; Winnipeg, Manitoba; R3B 1M2
- Products: Documentary
- Website: www.meritmotionpictures.com

Merit Motion Pictures is an independent documentary film and television production company based in Winnipeg, Manitoba, Canada. It was founded by Merit Jensen Carr in 1988.

Specializing in factual, multi-platform entertainment, Merit Motion Pictures has regularly produced for CBC's human interest and science/nature documentary strands: Doc Zone, The Nature of Things, and documentary Channel. The company has also collaborated with broadcasters as diverse as ZDF/ARTE, CTV, Shaw, National Geographic, PBS, Smithsonian Channel, TVO and Animal Planet.

In 2009, Merit Motion Pictures' television documentary The Secret World of Shoplifting achieved the highest audience ratings in the history of CBC’s Doc Zone, and the 4 x one-hour series One Ocean won Best Cross-Platform/New Media Program at the 2011 Jackson Hole Wildlife Film Festival. Their 2011 feature documentary TuTuMuch screened in Cineplex Odeon theatres across Canada and around the world.

The company's television documentary Smarty Plants: The Secret World of Plant Behaviour won Best Direction in a Documentary Program or Series at the 2013 Canadian Screen Awards, and garnered two more nominations in the categories of Best Science or Nature Documentary Program or Series, and Best Sound in an Information/Documentary Program or Series.

Carr received the Don Haig Award in 2013, presented by the Hot Docs Board of Directors as a celebration of her contributions to Canadian filmmaking, and the lifetime achievement award at the Winnipeg’s Women Entrepreneur of The Year Awards in 2014.

== Call of the Forest: The Forgotten Wisdom of Trees ==
In 2015, Merit Motion Pictures co-produced Call of the Forest: The Forgotten Wisdom of Trees, a feature-length documentary with Irish-Canadian botanist, medical biochemist and author Diana Beresford-Kroeger as its main subject. Directed, shot, edited and co-produced by Peabody Award-winner Jeff McKay (Fat Chance, 40 Years of One Night Stands), the documentary follows Beresford-Kroeger as she visits the world's northern forests, exploring the many benefits of trees in sustaining human and ecological well-being.

Call of the Forest was given the Nature Award at the 2016 Cinema Verde Festival, and has played at other international festivals including Festival Pariscience in 2017, and Wild & Scenic Film Festival in 2018. The film was nominated for the Rob Stewart Award for Best Science or Nature Documentary Program or Series at the 2018 Canadian Screen Awards. It also screened at independent cinemas across Canada including the Winnipeg Cinematheque, where it broke a 30-year box office record for tickets sold. A one-hour version of the film aired on TVO in 2017.

== Productions ==
Film title	Type	Length	Copyright Year	Primary Broadcaster	Co-producer	Awards
Almost Almost Famous	Feature Documentary	90 mins	2018	documentary Channel	Lank/Beach Productions	NA
Dr. Keri: Prairie Vet [Season 2]	TV series	10 x 1/2 hr	2018	Animal Planet	NA	NA
What Trees Talk About [Int'l title: Secrets in the World's Largest Forest]	Television Documentary	1 hr	2017	CBC and PBS	NA	NA
Dr. Keri: Prairie Vet [Season 1]	TV series	10 x 1/2 hr	2017	Animal Planet	NA	Best Direction for Episode 1: Meet Dr. Keri at the 2018 Leo Awards
Polar Bear Town - Summer [Season 2]	TV series	3 x 1 hr	2017	Smithsonian Channel	NA	NA
Beyond the Spectrum: A Family's Year Confronting Autism	Feature Documentary	90 mins	2017	TVO	Orangeville Road Pictures	Audience Choice Award at the 2018 Festival Inclús
Polar Bear Town - Winter [Season 1]	TV series	6 x 1 hr and 12 x 1/2 hr	2015	Smithsonian Channel and OLN	NA	NA
Call of the Forest: The Forgotten Wisdom of Trees	Feature Documentary	90 mins	2015	TVO	Edgeland Films	Nature Award at the 2016 Cinema Verde Film Festival; Nominations for Best Science Television and Best Conservation Film at the 2017 Pariscience Science Film Festival; Nomination for the Rob Stewart Award for Best Science or Nature Documentary Program or Series at the 2018 Canadian Screen Awards
Vietnam: Canada's Shadow War	Television Documentary	1 hr	2014	CBC's Doc Zone	NA	Best History Documentary Program or Series at the 2016 Canadian Screen Awards
Slaves to Habit	Television Documentary	1 hr	2014	CBC's Doc Zone	NA	NA
Decoding Desire	Television Documentary	1 hr	2014	CBC's The Nature of Things	NA	Best Writing in a Documentary Program or Series at the 2016 Canadian Screen Awards
Special Ed	Feature Documentary	110 mins	2013	Super Channel (Canada)	Spellburg Pictures	Official Selection of Hot Docs 2015
Faking the Grade [USA: Classroom Cheaters]	Television Documentary	1 hr	2013	CBC's Doc Zone	NA	Nomination for Best Editing in a Documentary Program or Series at the 2014 Canadian Screen Awards; Nominee of the 2013 Yorkton Film Festival
Ticked Off: The Mystery of Lyme Disease	Television Documentary	1 hr	2013	CBC's The Nature of Things	NA	Finalist at the 2014 Medea Awards
Conspiracy Rising	Television Documentary	1 hr	2012	CBC's Doc Zone	NA	NA
Surviving:) The Teenage Brain	Television Documentary	1 hr	2012	CBC's The Nature of Things	NA	Winner of Documentary Science/Medicine/Technology at the 2013 Yorkton Film Festival; Finalist in Documentary at the 2013 Writers' Guild of Canada Screenwriting Awards; Nominee of the 2013 Yorkton Film Festival; Finalist in Medical Sciences at the 2013 Jackson Hole Science Media Awards
Smarty Plants [USA: What Plants Talk About]	Television Documentary	1 hr	2012	CBC's The Nature of Things	NA	Best Direction in a Documentary Program or Series at the 2013 Canadian Screen Awards; Nomination for Best Science or Nature Documentary Program or Series at the 2013 Canadian Screen Awards; Nomination for the Robert Brooks Award for Documentary Cinematography at the 2013 Canadian Screen Awards; Nominee for Best Sound in an Information/Documentary Program or Series at the 2013 Canadian Screen Awards; Jury Award Winner at the 2013 Life Sciences Film Festival; Biodiversity Award at the 2014 CMS Vatavaran International Environment & Wildlife Film Festival; Nominee of the 2013 Yorkton Film Festival
Vixens and Virgins and Other Mythological Creatures	Television Documentary	1 hr	2012	Bell Media	Thinking Out Loud Productions	NA
Are We Digital Dummies [International title: Crackberry'd: The Truth About Information Overload]	Television Documentary	1 hr	2010	CBC's Doc Zone	NA	NA
One Ocean Interactive	Digital Media	NA	2010	CBC's The Nature of Things	Tactica Interactive	Best Website at the 2011 Advertising Association of Winnipeg Signature Awards; Best Cross-Platform/New Media Program at the 2011 Jackson Hole Wildlife Film Festival; 2011 Games for Change Nominee; Nomination for Best Cross-Platform Project, Non-Fiction at the 2010 Gemini Awards; Best Web-Based Games at the 2010 Canadian New Media Awards; Best in Industry Award for Television: Education and Science at the 2010 New Media Awards
One Ocean: Mysteries of the Deep	Television Documentary	1 hr	2010	CBC's The Nature of Things	NA	Nomination for Best Science, Technology, Nature or Environment Documentary Program at the 2010 Gemini Awards; Ocean Exploration and Adventure Award at the 2010 Blue Ocean Film Festival; Finalist in The Wave at the 2010 North Sea Film Festival
One Ocean: The Changing Sea	Television Documentary	1 hr	2010	CBC's The Nature of Things	NA	Best Marine Conservation Message and Merit for Scientific Content at the 2011 International Wildlife Film Festival; Best Marine and Earth Sciences at the 2010 Blue Ocean Film Festival; Finalist in The Wave at the 2010 North Sea Film Festival
TuTu MUCH	Feature Documentary	83 mins	2010	Super Channel (Canada)	Vonnie VON HELMOLT Films	Winner at the 2011 Chicago International Children's Film Festival; Winner at the 2011 China International Children's Film Festival; Canada Perspective Showcase Selection at the 2010 Cannes Marche du Film; Finalist in Best Film for a Teenage Audience at the 2010 Cinemagic; Finalist in Best Documentary at the 2010 Foyle Film Festival
The Secret World of Shoplifting [International title: The Truth About Shoplifting]	Television Documentary	1 hr	2009	CBC's Doc Zone	NA	Nomination for Best Original Music Score for Documentary Program or Series at the 2010 Gemini Awards
Ballet High	Feature Documentary	90 mins	2009	Bravo (Canada)	Vonnie VON HELMOLT Films	Nomination for Allan King Award for Excellence in Documentary at the 2010 Directors' Guild of Canada Awards; Nomination for Best Direction in a Performing Arts Program at the 2009 Gemini Awards
The Truth About Liars	Television Documentary	1 hr	2008	CBC's Doc Zone	NA	NA
40 Years of One Night Stands	Television Documentary	1 hr	2008	Bravo (Canada)	Inside Out Productions	Best Documentary Writing at the 2010 Writers' Guild of Canada Screenwriting Awards; People's Choice Awards at the 2010 Bay Street Film Festival; Chris Award Honourable Mention at the 2009 Columbus Film Festival; Golden Sheaf Award for Best Documentary (Arts & Culture) at the 2009 Yorkton Film Festival; Golden Sheaf Award for Best Directing (Non-Fiction) at the 2009 Yorkton Film Festival; Founders Award at the 2009 Yorkton Film Festival
41 Years of One Night Stands	Feature Documentary	90 mins	2008	Theatrical	Inside Out Productions	NA
Science of the Senses - Hearing	Television Documentary	90 mins	2008	CBC's The Nature of Things	NA	NA
Science of the Senses - Touch	Television Documentary	90 mins	2008	CBC's The Nature of Things	NA	Golden Sheaf Award for Best Science/Medicine Documentary Series at the 2008 Yorkton Film Festival; Golden Sheaf Award for Best Research for a Documentary at the 2008 Yorkton Film Festival
Recreating Eden - Season 5	TV Series	13 x 30 mins	2008	VisionTV	NA	NA
Sabrina's Law	Television Documentary	1 hr	2007	Global Television Network	Lank/Beach Productions	NA
Recreating Eden - Season 4	TV Series	13 x 30 mins	2007	VisionTV	NA	Best Lifestyle Series at the 2007 Gemini Awards; Best Direction in a Lifestyle Series (Episode 51: The Lost Pears) at the 2007 Gemini Awards; Best Lifestyle Program (Episode 51: The Lost Pears) at the 2007 Gemini Awards
Ballet Girls	TV Series	3 x 1 hr	2006	Bravo (Canada)	Vonnie VON HELMOLT Films	Nomination for Best Children's or Youth Non-Fiction Program or Series at the 2007 Gemini Awards
Recreating Eden - Season 3	TV Series	13 x 30 mins	2006	VisionTV	NA	Best Writing in an Information Program or Series (Episode 34: Gardens in the Sky) at the 2007 Gemini Awards
Recreating Eden - Season 2	TV Series	13 x 30 mins	2005	HGTV (Canada)	NA	Best Cinematography Overall, Non-Fiction (Episode 26: Touched by Luck) at the 2006 Blizzard Awards; Best Direction in a Lifestyle Program or Series (Episode 16: Garden of the Gods) at the 2004 Gemini Awards
Haunts of the Black Masseur	Television Documentary	1 hr	2004	ZDF and TVOntario	Edgeland Films	NA
Recreating Eden - Season 1	TV Series	13 x 30 mins	2004	HGTV (Canada)	NA	Golden Sheaf for Best Documentary Series at the 2005 Yorkton Film Fest; Nomination for Best Lifestyle/General Interest Series at the 2004 Gemini Awards; Silver Remi for Best Leisure & Recreation - Film & Video Production at the 2004 WorldFest Houston Awards
The Pill	Television Documentary	1 hr	1999	CBC's The Nature of Things	NA	Woman's Health Finalist at the Time Inc. Health Freddie Awards; Chris Award - Bronze Plaque at the Columbus Film Festival; Nomination for Best Science Program at the Gemini Awards
Smudge	Television Documentary	30 mins	1997	TNT (TV channel)	NA	Humanitas Prize - Executive Producer; Silver Hugo at the Chicago International Television Festival; International Emmy Award Nominee
Asking Different Questions: Women and Science	Television Documentary	1 hr	1996	Discovery Channel (Canada)	NA	NA
The Mayor of Odessa	TV Drama	30 mins	1994	CBC	Riverain Productions	Best Drama Short at the Blizzard Awards; Gemini Award Nominee
By Woman's Hand	Television Documentary	1 hr	1993	VisionTV	NA	NA
Niagara Falls	TV Drama	30 mins	1992	CBC	West End Productions	NA

Programs featuring the Royal Winnipeg Ballet:

- TuTuMUCH theatrical documentary, shown by Cineplex Odeon and Hoyts Australia & New Zealand
- Ballet High broadcast on Bravo!
- 40 Years of One Night Stands broadcast on Bravo!
- Ballet Girls miniseries broadcast on Bravo!
