= Bronson Pelletier =

Canadian actor

- Born: December 31, 1986 (age 39)
- Occupation: Actor
- Years active: 2004–present

Bronson Pelletier (born December 31, 1986) is a Canadian actor. He is best known for his roles as Jack Sinclair in renegadepress.com (2004–2008) and as Jared Cameron in The Twilight Saga film series.

== Life and career ==
Bronson Pelletier was born on December 31, 1986. He is of Plains Cree and French heritage. He had four brothers, one died as a young teen after he had been hit by a car in Surrey, British Columbia. He travelled to New Zealand and Denmark to promote The Twilight Saga: New Moon, where he took part in interviews and attended the Armageddon Expo in Auckland and the Collectormania in Copenhagen. While in Copenhagen, Denmark, he met his wife Sabine Bezzelt Moestrup Pelletier attending the same party. They separated in 2016. He also participated in 'The Apartment' season 4.

In May 2017, Pelletier signed with New York City based Shakir Entertainment Management.

== Filmography ==
Year	Title	Role	Notes
2018	Conundrum:Secrets among friends	Jake Akando	Film
2015	Fishing Naked	David Ottertale	Film
2012	The Twilight Saga: Breaking Dawn – Part II	Jared Cameron	Film
2011	The Twilight Saga: Breaking Dawn – Part I	Jared Cameron	Film
2010	The Twilight Saga: Eclipse	Jared Cameron	Film
2009	The Twilight Saga: New Moon	Jared Cameron	Film
2007	renegadepress.com	Jack Sinclair	Aboriginal Peoples Television Network TV series
2007	Dinosapien	Kit Whitefeather	Discovery Kids and CBBC TV series
