= Renegadepress.com =

Canadian television series (2004–2008)

renegadepress.com
- Season 1 DVD cover
- Created by: Virginia Thompson; Robert de Lint
- Starring: Bronson Pelletier; Ksenia Solo
- Country of origin: Canada
- No. of seasons: 5
- No. of episodes: 52 (list of episodes)

Production
- Running time: 22 minutes (approx)
- Production companies: Access; Knowledge Network; TVO; TFO; SCN; Global; Vérité Films (Note: As Renegade Press Productions Inc. (season 1), Renegade Press Productions II Inc. (season 2), Renegade Press Productions III Inc. (season 3), Renegade Press Productions IV Inc. (season 4), and Renegade Press Productions V Inc. (season 5)); APTN Original Series

Original release
- Network: APTN
- Release: January 18, 2004 – April 25, 2008

renegadepress.com is a Canadian teen drama television series, produced by Vérité Films for the Aboriginal Peoples Television Network.

== Plot ==
The storyline follows the lives of a group of teenagers running an e-zine about their daily experiences. The main characters are Zoey (Ksenia Solo), an average upper middle-class girl who thinks of herself as a bit of a nerd, and Jack (Bronson Pelletier), a boy of First Nations origin. The series deals with teenage topics, including relationships, sex and drugs. Every season, two to three new characters are introduced, who join in writing the e-zine. These characters are usually added to explore new areas of teen life and problems.

The show is no longer in production, although reruns continue to air on APTN. In 2008, the Global Television Network also began airing the show's first season. TFO, the French language educational broadcaster in Ontario, has also aired a French dubbed version of the program. In 2012, renegadepress.com made its American debut on the Starz channel Starz Kids & Family.

== Cast ==
- Bronson Pelletier as Jack Sinclair
- Ksenia Solo as Zoey Jones
- Ishan Davé as Sandi Bhutella
- Shawn Erker as Oscar Cherniak
- Rachel Colwell as Crystal Sinclair
- Ingrid Nilson as Patti
- Magda Apanowicz as Alex Young
- Nolan Gerard Funk as Ben Lalonde
- Ephraim Ellis as Dylan
- Katlin Long-Wright as Heath Stevenson
- Matthew Strongeagle as Michael
- Wendy Anderson as Linda Jones, Zoey's mother
- David Neale as Brian Jones, Zoey's father
- Lorne Cardinal as Wayne Sinclair, Jack and Crystal's father
- Curtis Lum as Connor
- Nikki Elek as Suzie
