= Shawn Pierce =

- Genres: Television score, Film score
- Occupation: Composer

Shawn Pierce is a television and film score composer. He has resided in Vancouver, Los Angeles and Winnipeg.

== Career ==
Pierce is a graduate of the Berklee College of Music in Boston, where he majored in Film Scoring.

He has worked as a music editor and composer on various TV series, garnering multiple award nominations, including a Leo Award nomination for the film A Wrinkle in Time in 2004 and three Leo Award nominations for work on The Dead Zone in 2007. In 2006, he provided the music for the Canadian documentary series Recreating Eden, for which he received a Gemini nomination (Best Original Music for a Lifestyle/Practical Information or Reality Program or Series 2008). In 2015, he was also nominated for a Canadian Screen Award for Best Original Music Score for a Series for his work on the show Haven. At the Idyllwild International Festival of Cinema, Shawn Pierce received The Marshall Hawkins Award in 2015 for Best Original Score for his work on the movie Euphoria.

Over the last 20 years, Pierce has worked on many records with credits for mixing, engineering and producing, including Coco Love Alcorn's album Joyful (2009) on which he also played guitar and trumpet, and supplied backing vocals. His work on albums stopped in 2008 and he subsequently focused all of his time on scoring.

His credits include the scores for the dramatic science fiction series Defying Gravity (2009), the 2012 documentary film, We Were Children, and the 2018 Canadian drama film Into Invisible Light.

He is a co-founder of the entertainment tech start-up WIO, which launched a new service, WIOpro, at the start of 2022. This service monitors what film and television titles are aired across 55 countries and allows those entitled to royalties from these titles to track if they are being accurately compensated.
