= Eight Days to Live =

- Written by: David Fraser; Peter Smith
- Directed by: Norma Bailey
- Starring: Kelly Rowan; Shawn Doyle; Dustin Milligan; Tegan Moss; Ryan McDonell; Brian Markinson; Katharine Isabelle
- Music by: Robert Carli and closing song = lost by Joel Auge and Hewit
- Country of origin: Canada
- Original language: English

Production
- Producers: Ken Gord; Shane Kinnear
- Cinematography: Paul Sarossy
- Running time: 90 minutes
- Production company: Shaftesbury Films

Original release
- Network: CTV
- Release: 2006

Eight Days to Live is a 2006 television film produced by CTV about a mother who organizes a search and rescue for her son who drives off the road in the Lytton area of the Fraser Canyon of British Columbia. It is based on the true story of nineteen year old Joe Spring who spent eight days trapped inside his red sports car.

== Plot ==
Nineteen-year-old Joe Spring's driver's license is reinstated after it had been suspended for reckless driving. Immediately after he is informed, he begs his parents - Teresa and Tim Spring - to let him drive from their home in Aldergrove, BC to Quesnel, BC to attend a Saturday night party. His parents reluctantly agree. Joe decides to leave Friday after work, driving overnight, and promises to call them as soon as he arrives the next morning. That telephone call never happens.

Late Saturday in the middle of the night, Joe's parents get a phone call from someone at the party who says Joe didn't show up, but the caller is too stoned to provide details. Joe doesn't answer his mother's repeated phone calls, and Joe's girlfriend Patti soon shows up and tells her that the reason Joe left a day early was to stop at her house first to spend the night together. Patti threw him out and broke his phone when she found out he was sexting with a girl named Lucinda. When the police are unable to help, Teresa starts her own investigation, largely without Tim's help, he who feels so far unconcerned. Tim's non-regard irks Teresa, the two who have been having marital problems stemming from Tim being out of work, as Tim has basically retreated from life ever since.

Teresa, with teenage daughter Becca's help, guesses Joe's email password and finds a sex related email from Lucinda, who lives in Chasm, BC. With Tim needing to go to a job interview, Teresa and Becca drive up to Chasm and are able to locate Lucinda, who they learn is a player. Lucinda denies having seen Joe. Teresa then goes to the Hope detachment of the RCMP, who suggests that they create missing person posters but explains they cannot help until Joe has been missing for 48 hours. A young Indian boy who Joe gave a ride to, named after the village of Powell River, subsequently recognizes Joe from the poster as the person who gave him a ride home on Saturday morning.

As time passes and the police launch an investigation, they find some of the people who Joe talked to. They bring a marijuana grow-op owner in for questioning, who leads them to a marijuana dealer named Weaver. Weaver is Lucinda's current casual boyfriend and it is found that Joe helped Weaver transport marijuana in his car.

With the help of Joe's credit card records, the police and Joe's family begin to narrow down where he could have crashed. A search and rescue team is sent out near Chasm, but they cannot find Joe or his car. While searching with the team, Teresa finds an empty overturned vehicle which resembles Joe's car. Upon a closer inspection, they realize it was not. Back in town, a man who Joe helped change a tire recognizes Joe from the images of him on TV. The search and rescue team realizes they have been searching in the wrong location. They move to the new location just outside Hope, but still cannot find Joe. It is shown that after helping the man, Joe fell asleep at the wheel and crashed.

The police sergeant, Al Ramey, explains to Joe's family that since the search has reached the eighth day, it has been downgraded from a rescue to a recovery. This means that the helicopter will no longer be involved and that the ground search crew will be minimized. Outside, Joe's mother begs the helicopter pilot, Jodeen Cassidy, to go up one last time against Ramey's orders to look for Joe. She initially refuses, but does so and the sergeant, who didn't like the order anyway, lets her go. As they fly, Joe's mother spots Joe's car. They land, and she gets out and cries over Joe's bloody, lifeless body. Joe begins to move, and the police officer who flew them there calls for EMS. While Joe is badly injured, he survives and recovers.

== Cast ==
- Kelly Rowan as Teresa Spring
- Shawn Doyle as Tim Spring
- Dustin Milligan as Joe Spring
- Tegan Moss as Becca Spring
- Ryan McDonell as Will Spring
- Ty Olsson as Craig
- Gwynyth Walsh as Jodeen Cassidy
- James Parks as Anderson
- Michael Eklund as Weaver
- Brian Markinson as Al Ramey
- Katharine Isabelle as Lucinda Klunn
