= Shades of Black: The Conrad Black Story =

- Genre: Biography; Drama
- Written by: Andrew Wreggitt
- Directed by: Alex Chapple
- Starring: Albert Schultz; Lara Flynn Boyle
- Music by: Christopher Dedrick
- Country of origin: Canada
- Original language: English

Production
- Executive producers: Heather Haldane; Gub Neal; Justin Thomson
- Producer: Mary Young Leckie
- Cinematography: Rene Ohashi
- Editor: George Roulston
- Production company: Screen Door

Original release
- Release: 4 December 2006

Shades of Black: The Conrad Black Story is a 2006 drama about ambition, love, betrayal and greed. The film chronicles the private and public struggles of Lord Conrad Black, one of the world's most controversial press barons.

== Cast ==
- Albert Schultz as Conrad Black
- Lara Flynn Boyle as Barbara Amiel
- Jason Priestley as Jeff Riley
- Jason Schombing as David Radler
- Cedric Smith as George
- Sharry Flett as Betty
- Michael Seater as Young Conrad Black
- Jeremy Akerman as Bud
- Rick Roberts as Morde
- Shawn Lawrence
- Amy Price-Francis as Shirley Black
- Corinne Conley as Maude
- Joan Gregson as Doris Phillips
- Philip Craig as Meighen
- Rhea Akler as Rona
- Ian White as Lord
- Mark Caven as Lawson
- Sven Van de Ven as Henry Kissinger
- Elizabeth Shepherd as Margaret Thatcher
- James Kall as Steward

== 2007 Gemini Awards ==
- Rene Ohashi won Best Photography in a Dramatic Program or Series
- Mike Woroniuk, Christian T. Cooke, Robert Fletcher, Paul Germann, & Barry Gilmore won Best Sound in a Dramatic Program
