= Creative Atlantic Communications =

- Type: Private
- Industry: Entertainment
- Founded: 1989
- Founders: Greg Jones; Janice Evans
- Headquarters: Halifax, Nova Scotia, Canada
- Products: Robson Arms; Liography

Creative Atlantic Communications Ltd. is a Canadian television production company based in Halifax, Nova Scotia.

== History ==
Creative Atlantic was established in 1989 by Greg Jones and Janice Evans, initially creating advertising and corporate communications media. Ten years later, Creative Atlantic began to develop and produce television programming for the broadcast market, producing a range of television series' from scripted comedies to documentaries to children's programming and more.

== Current and past productions ==
- The 902
- Robson Arms
- Liography
- Celtic Soul: The Life and Music of John Allan Cameron
- Ted Nolan: Behind the Bench
- As We Appear: The Story of Erica Rutherford
- Natalie MacMaster: Bringing The World Home
- The Singular Series
- Remedy Me
- King O' Fun
- The Mighty Jungle (Season 1 only)
- Here I Am: The story of Denny Doherty and the Mamas and Papas
