= List of renegadepress.com episodes =

This is an episode list for the Canadian teen drama renegadepress.com. The series began airing on APTN in Canada. It lasted five seasons, from 2004 to 2008. A few years after the series finale aired, the show made its American debut on Starz Kids & Family in 2012.

== Series overview ==
Season	Episodes	Originally released	
Season	Episodes	First released	Last released
1	13	January 18, 2004	April 18, 2004
2	9	January 16, 2005	March 13, 2005
3	9	February 6, 2006	April 3, 2006
4	13	February 15, 2007	May 10, 2007
5	8	March 8, 2008	April 25, 2008

== Episodes ==
=== Season 1 (2004) ===
No. overall	No. in season	Title	Directed by	Written by	Original release date
1	1	"Out in the Open"	Robert de Lint	Robert de Lint	January 18, 2004
When renegadepress.com receives an anonymous message from a bullied student, Zoey Jones decides this is the perfect opportunity for the site to tackle more serious issues by investigating the school's bullying issue. However, she soon becomes the target of a violent school girl gang. Meanwhile, in order to become a writer for renegade, Sandi is ordered to interview students about sex, to embarrassing results.
2	2	"A Real Connection"	Robert de Lint	Jordan Wheeler	January 25, 2004
Crystal learns about the dangers of cyber relationships. Carmen manipulates Sandi into letting her contribute to the site.
3	3	"Out on a Limb"	Jeff Beesley	Robert de Lint and Sara Snow	February 1, 2004
Zoey makes some bad decisions when she befriends Ben, the new "bad boy" in town. Oscar helps Sandi with his advice column.
4	4	"Skin Deep"	Jeff Beesley	Susin Nielsen	February 8, 2004
Carmen encounters a girl in her dance class who is getting breast implants. When her teacher assigns a family history project, Crystal is reluctant to reveal her Cree heritage to the class.
5	5	"Too Cool"	Rob King	Ian Barr	February 15, 2004
Sandi loses all judgement when he joins a skater club. Jack competes in a songwriting rap competition.
6	6	"Hard to Hold"	Rob King	Jordan Wheeler	February 22, 2004
The unethical treatment of the kids in a group home are uncovered by Zoey and Ben, who lives in the group home. Jack Sinclair and his father don't see eye-to-eye after Jack speaks at an aboriginal youth group.
7	7	"Some of My Best Friends are Indian"	Robert de Lint	Jordan Wheeler	February 29, 2004
When a local white kid dies from sniffing, Jack sets out to prove that sniffing isn't only an "Indian thing."
8	8	"A Very Thin Edge"	Robert de Lint	Sara Snow	March 7, 2004
Zoey is worried that her friend, Melanie, may be anorexic. However, she is surprised when she learns that Melanie belongs to a "pro-ana" support group. With the insistence of his mother, Sandi goes on a date with an Indian girl named Hema.
9	9	"Just Cause"	Stephen Hall	Jordan Wheeler	March 14, 2004
Carmen is caught between a male teacher she admires and the female student who is accusing him of sexual abuse. Oscar accuses another student of cheating on a math test.
10	10	"The Long Way Home"	Rob King	Ian Barr	March 28, 2004
When Jack's cousin, Reg, reveals that he left the "Red Clan" (an aboriginal gang), Jack becomes worried for his safety. Ben leaves the group home, worrying Zoey.
11	11	"Secrets and Lies"	Rob King	Susin Nielsen	April 4, 2004
While conducting a project on surveillance cameras, Zoey discovers something shocking involving her parents. Hema breaks up with Sandi.
12	12	"Body and Soul"	Robert de Lint	Sara Snow	April 11, 2004
Carmen, an aspiring model, discovers the ugly side of the business.
13	13	"A Tangled Web"	Robert de Lint	Sara Snow and Susin Nielsen	April 18, 2004
Jack and Zoey's site is in danger of closing when scandal involving a viral video erupts. Oscar creates a controversial short film involving the school.

=== Season 2 (2005) ===
No. overall	No. in season	Title	Directed by	Written by	Original release date
14	1	"The Ride"	Robert de Lint	Jordan Wheeler	January 16, 2005
Jack and Zoey's relationship is put to the test when Jack becomes involved in a story about police brutality towards Indians. Patti begins writing for the site.
15	2	"Can You See Me Now"	Robert de Lint	Sara Snow	January 23, 2005
Zoey is jealous of Jack's new girlfriend. Patti interviews a teenage camgirl for renegade.
16	3	"How Sweet the Sound"	Jeff Beesley	Ian Barr	January 30, 2005
Jack learns that his new girlfriend may be associated with a neo-nazi group. Carmen, Sandi, and Oscar audition for a singing competition.
17	4	"Giving Yourself Away"	Jeff Beesley	Sara Snow	February 6, 2005
Melanie does a renegade story on hazing in school sport teams. Crystal has a hard time coming to terms with her father's new girlfriend.
18	5	"Union"	Lorne Cardinal	Jordan Wheeler	February 13, 2005
Jack's Native girlfriend, Tina, might be taken away from her adoptive parents. Patti decides to form a union at the Underground.
19	6	"The Power of Love"	Robert de Lint	Sara Snow	February 20, 2005
Mrs. Tropek begins a relationship with one of her students. Zoey considers moving out when her mother starts dating a younger man.
20	7	"Mano A Mano"	Rob King	Iain MacLean, Sara Snow, and Jordan Wheeler	February 27, 2005
Sandi and Oscar are at odds when Sandi begins using steroids to stay on the football team. Oscar tells Patti he may be bisexual. Zoey adjusts to living with her newly single father.
21	8	"Faith and Friendship"	Rob King	Carol Greyeyes	March 6, 2005
Zoey is conflicted when her friend, Melanie, decides to wear a hijab. Crystal and former gang member, Michael, develop a relationship. Jack wants to combine hip hop with traditional Native music.
22	9	"Dying to Connect"	Robert de Lint	Jordan Wheeler	March 13, 2005
When Jack finally asks Zoey out on a date, things get complicated when Zoey confesses that she's already lost her virginity. Tensions only rise when they both frantically try to stop a student from overdosing via webcam.

=== Season 3 (2006) ===
No. overall	No. in season	Title	Directed by	Written by	Original release date
23	1	"Chemical Solutions"	Robert de Lint	Sara Snow	February 6, 2006
Crystal is scared when she realizes that her best friend, Monica, is addicted to Crystal Meth. Zoey and Jack are officially a couple.
24	2	"Homeward Bound"	Jeff Beesley	Jordan Wheeler	February 13, 2006
Highschooler Emilio is in danger of being deported back to Guatemala. Zoey and Melanie decide to help him stay. Patti befriends a bad girl names Alex.
25	3	"This is Your Brain on Love"	Jeff Beesley	Sara Snow	February 20, 2006
Sandi auditions for a rock band in order to impress Charlotte. Jack and Zoey consider taking their relationship to the next level.
26	4	"The Rez"	Robert de Lint	Jordan Wheeler	February 27, 2006
Jack and Crystal confront their old haunts when their father takes them back to the Indian reserve for a visit.
27	5	"Stolen Lives"	Robert de Lint	Jordan Wheeler	March 6, 2006
Alex discovers a shocking piece of family history. Meanwhile, Mr. Jones (Zoey's father) and his new girlfriend tell Zoey they're having a baby.
28	6	"The Naked Truth"	Rob King	Sara Snow	March 13, 2006
Sandi and Charlotte's night at home is interrupted by an impromptu wild party. Tina comes back to town with her sister for Jack's help.
29	7	"Picture This"	Lorne Cardinal	Carol Greyeyes	March 20, 2006
Zoey is caught between Melanie and Alex when a cyber bullying scandal breaks loose. Crystal's friend, Monica, comes back home from rehab.
30	8	"The Dance"	Rob King	Jordan Wheeler	March 27, 2006
Despite being Patti's boyfriend, Oscar decides to go to the dance with gay student Nathan as a protest against the school's inaction concerning homophobic bashing. Zoey and Jack's relationship finally blossoms.
31	9	"Fear"	Robert de Lint	Sara Snow	April 3, 2006
Zoey and Jack argue over the ethics of censorship when a controversial story is sent to renegade. Meanwhile, Alex demands more information about her father from her mother.

=== Season 4 (2007) ===
No. overall	No. in season	Title	Directed by	Written by	Original release date
32	1	"Retrospective"	Robert de Lint, Jeff Beesley, and Rob King	Dylan Worts, Sara Snow, and Jordan Wheeler	February 15, 2007
Clip show with scenes from the last three seasons.
33	2	"Rules of Engagement"	Jeff Beesley	Jordan Wheeler	February 22, 2007
Zoey and Alex team up to uncover the violent world of cyberbullying. An old friend (Nicole) from the reserve meets up with Jack, much to Zoey's chagrin.
34	3	"Slow Burn"	Jeff Beesley	Penny E. Gummerson	March 1, 2007
A volleyball player realizes she's in an abusive relationship. Crystal and Michael begin to date, angering Mr. Sinclair.
35	4	"Smoke Screen"	Rob King	Sara Snow	March 8, 2007
Sandi is shocked when Charlotte's parents offer him pot. Mr. Sinclair is reluctant to reveal his past experiences in residential schools.
36	5	"Civic Pride"	Rob King	Jordan Wheeler	March 15, 2007
Fed up with some school policies, Oscar decides to run for school trustee.
37	6	"The Real Story"	Jeff Beesley	Sara Snow	March 22, 2007
A student dies from a car accident, setting off a variety of emotions from the characters.
38	7	"Legacies"	Jeff Beesley	Jordan Wheeler	March 29, 2007
Mr. Sinclair has a tough time coming to terms with his residential school past. Meanwhile, Zoey develops a drinking problem.
39	8	"Third Wheel"	Lorne Cardinal	Jordan Wheeler	April 5, 2007
When Jack and Crystal's mother needs a bone marrow transplant, it is Crystal, not Jack, who is the right match for the operation. Alex feels left out when Zoey starts going out with Dylan.
40	9	"Alternate Reality"	Lorne Cardinal	Will Dixon	April 12, 2007
Feeling alone, Sandi becomes addicted to a video game. Zoey and Dylan's relationship hits a roadblock. Jack discovers provocative photos of a woman who looks like Nicole.
41	10	"The Fix"	Carol Greyeyes	Rob King	April 19, 2007
Zoey develops an addiction to pills. Alex reconnects with her father. Mr. Sinclair attends a support group for victims of residential school abuse.
42	11	"Breathe"	Rob King	Sara Snow	April 26, 2007
Teens cope with the stress of exam week.
43	12	"Sullengirl16"	Robert de Lint	Will Dixon	May 3, 2007
Sandi decides to reclaim his independence by embracing "emo" culture. Jack tries to get to the bottom a viral video hoax.
44	13	"Getting It Right (aka Blackout)"	Robert de Lint	Sara Snow	May 10, 2007
Wild party leads to consequences for Zoey and, especially, Alex. Jack and Zoey reconcile.

=== Season 5 (2008) ===
No. overall	No. in season	Title	Directed by	Written by	Original release date
45	1	"Life Today"	Jeff Beesley	Sara Snow	March 8, 2008
After being raped by Dylan, Alex goes to trial against him. Michael tells Crystal he has a child.
46	2	"Cyber Sandbox"	Jeff Beesley	Jordan Wheeler	March 14, 2008
Susie attempts to prank a strict teacher. New kid, Connor, tries to become a writer for renegade. Mr. Sinclair and Joanne announce they're getting married. Zoey gets a baby half brother.
47	3	"Lost and Found"	Robert de Lint	Robert de Lint	March 23, 2008
Zoey has a hard time in Alcoholics Anonymous. Nicole tries to repair her relationship with Jack.
48	4	"Reclamation"	Lorne Cardinal	Jordan Wheeler	March 28, 2008
Crystal tries to help her meth addicted friend, Monica. Connor and Susie make a sex tape.
49	5	"On My Own"	Robert de Lint	Sara Snow	April 4, 2008
Patti finally has enough money saved up to live in her own apartment. However, her independent life is interrupted when Sandi asks to crash with her.
50	6	"Beautiful Girls"	Lorne Cardinal	Sara Snow	April 11, 2008
Alex is still struggling to move on from her rape and the proceeding court case that followed. With Susie's help, Connor writes an article about girls' constant makeup use.
51	7	"Reality Rites"	Rob King	Jordan Wheeler	April 18, 2008
Jack is horrified when he discovers that his music is actually unintentionally inspiring troubled kids in the reserve to consider suicide. Mr. Sinclair and Joanne prepare for their wedding.
52	8	"Dancing"	Robert de Lint	Sara Snow	April 25, 2008
Zoey and Patti audition for a Montreal dance troupe. Jack considers his options when a company offers to buy renegadepress for $10,000.
