= EMPz 4 Life =

- Directed by: Allan King
- Produced by: Allan King
- Cinematography: Mark Ellam
- Edited by: Nick Hector
- Music by: Chris Ellis
- Production company: At Home in the Hood Films
- Release date: September 9, 2006 (TIFF)
- Running time: 113 minutes
- Country: Canada
- Language: English

EMPz 4 Life is a 2006 Canadian documentary film, directed by Allan King. Made in conjunction with writer Joseph Jomo Pierre, the film profiles a small group of Black Canadian youths living in the troubled Toronto neighbourhood of Malvern, who are enrolled in an after-school math tutoring program run by social worker Brian Henry in an effort to keep them in school and not out on the streets.

The film takes its title from graffiti in the neighbourhood, referring to Empringham Drive.

The film premiered on September 9, 2006, at the 2006 Toronto International Film Festival, but was distributed primarily as an episode of TVOntario's documentary series The View from Here in February 2007.

It was King's final film, as his planned next film was in production but not completed at the time of his death in 2009.

== Awards ==
The film was a shortlisted nominee for the Donald Brittain Award, and Mark Ellam was nominated for Best Photography in a Documentary Program or Series, at the 22nd Genie Awards in 2007. The film was also shortlisted for the Directors Guild of Canada's DGC Award for Best Documentary Film.

== Impact ==
The film received renewed attention in 2025 as the subject of a possible "curse", as several of the youths from Henry's program who appeared in the film are now dead or in prison.
