= Robson Arms =

- Robson Arms title screen
- Created by: Gary Harvey; Susin Nielsen
- Country of origin: Canada
- No. of seasons: 3
- No. of episodes: 39

Production
- Executive producers: Gary Harvey; Susin Nielsen; Brian Hamilton
- Running time: 22 minutes

Original release
- Network: CTV
- Release: June 17, 2005 – June 30, 2008

Robson Arms is a Canadian television series that began airing on CTV on June 17, 2005, and ended on June 30, 2008. Robson Arms is a co-production between Vancouver-based Omni Film Productions Limited and Halifax's Creative Atlantic Communications.

The show is a comedy-drama (dramedy) anthology organized around the Robson Arms, an apartment building in Vancouver, at the fictional address of 951 Pendrell Street. Each of the show's episodes focuses principally on a different tenant of the building, although the core cast members interact in minor roles throughout the series. In each episode, the Troubadours comment on the storyline through song.

The show was created to fulfill a licensing requirement of CTV's Vancouver station, CIVT, which originally promised, as an independent station, to produce 20 episodes of an anthology series entitled The Storytellers. Only ten such episodes were produced. The Canadian Radio-television and Telecommunications Commission (CRTC) did not agree that CIVT's new network programming supplanted this commitment and asked the station to fulfill its promise. CTV believed the anthology would be more successful as a series with common characters, and Robson Arms was the result.

Two of the show's regular cast members, Gabrielle Miller and Fred Ewanuick, appeared in this series concurrent with their continuing roles in another CTV production, Corner Gas.

The series currently airs in reruns on CTV's secondary CTV Two system.

== Cast and characters ==
The season(s) during which each actor has been included in the main cast are marked in black. White square means the actor doesn't appear in that season at all.

| Actor(s) | Character | Appearances | | |
| Actor(s) | Character | S 1 | S 2 | S 3 |
|---|---|---|---|---|
| Tom Saunders | The Tall Troubadour | | | |
| Jason Dedrick | The Not as Tall Troubadour | | | |
| John Cassini | Yuri Kukoc | | | |
| Helena Yea | Grandma Tan | | | |
| Colin Foo | Bao Tan | | | |
| Gabrielle Rose | Toni Mastroianni-Tan | | | |
| Justine Wong | Ruby Tan | | | |
| Zak Santiago | Hal Garcia | | | |
| Alisen Down | Sault Ste. Marie | | | |
| David Richmond-Peck | Geoff McAlister | | | |
| Fred Ewanuick | Nick Papathanasiou | | | |
| Kevin McNulty | Stanley Wasserman | | | |
| Haig Sutherland | Fred Fochs | | | |
| Jane McGregor | Alicia Plecas-Fochs | | | |
| Gabrielle Miller | Bobbi Briggs | | | |
| Tobias Mehler | Bobby Briggs | | | |
| William B. Davis | Dr. Carlisle Wainwright | | | |
| Margot Kidder | Elaine Wainwright | | | |
| Jim Tai | Ricky Tan | | | |
| Maxine Miller | Beatrice Dubois | | | |
| Shirley Douglas | Pauline Dubois | | | |
| Mark McKinney | Tom Goldblum | | | |
| Megan Follows | Janice Keneally | | | |
| Peter DeLuise | Wayne Ross | | | |
| Laura Bertram | Chris Colton | | | |
| Gabriel Hogan | Andrew Colton | | | |
| Linda Kash | Carol Goldstein | | | |
| Tegan Moss | Georgie Goldstein | | | |
| Bill Mondy | Val Kukoc | | | |
| April Telek | Sasha Kowalski | | | |
| Allison Hossack | Trixie Hoskins | | | |
| Dave Foley | Chuck Hoskins | | | |

== Robson Arms, the Building ==
The structure used as the apartment building is not located in Vancouver's West End, but rather is located at 951 Boundary Road on the east side of the City of Vancouver. It is called Taylor Manor, and is on the City of Vancouver's historic building registry. The skyscraper skyline behind the building is superimposed to make it look like it is located in Vancouver's West End.

== Episodes ==
=== Season 1 (2005) ===
| Episode # | Original Air Date (CTV) | Episode title |
|---|---|---|
| 1 | June 17, 2005 | Dancing the Horizontal Mambo |
| 2 | June 17, 2005 | The Tell-Tale Latex |
| 3 | June 24, 2005 | The Eyes of Grandma Tan |
| 4 | June 24, 2005 | ICQ |
| 5 | July 1, 2005 | A Certain Vintage |
| 6 | July 1, 2005 | Sweet City Woman |
| 7 | July 8, 2005 | Hairpiece of Mind |
| 8 | July 8, 2005 | A Material Breach |
| 9 | July 15, 2005 | The Lonely Passion of Mr. Tan |
| 10 | July 15, 2005 | Educating Alicia |
| 11 | July 22, 2005 | The Recipe |
| 12 | July 22, 2005 | The Misses Dubois Turn Out the Lights |
| 13 | July 29, 2005 | Aftershock |

=== Season 2 (2007) ===
| Episode # | Original Air Date (CTV) | Episode title |
|---|---|---|
| 1 | February 10, 2007 | Ordinary Assholes |
| 2 | February 17, 2007 | Saultology |
| 3 | February 24, 2007 | I Did Not Have Sex With That Woman |
| 4 | March 3, 2007 | Something Straight Between Us |
| 5 | March 10, 2007 | Mr. Lonely |
| 6 | February 27, 2007 | Pest Control |
| 7 | March 17, 2007 | Misery, Inc. |
| 8 | March 12, 2007 | The Daughter of Frankenstein |
| 9 | March 24, 2007 | Wayne's World |
| 10 | March 31, 2007 | Mussolini and Me |
| 11 | April 7, 2007 | All About Kitty |
| 12 | April 14, 2007 | Lizard of Doubt |
| 13 | April 21, 2007 | Texas Birthmark |

=== Season 3 (2008) ===
| Episode # | Original Air Date (CTV) | Episode title |
|---|---|---|
| 1 | February 26, 2008 | Gila Monster |
| 2 | February 27, 2008 | Geeks in Love |
| 3 | May 5, 2008 | Positivity |
| 4 | May 12, 2008 | I Pagliacci |
| 5 | April 28, 2008 | Mean Girls |
| 6 | May 19, 2008 | Prince of Nigeria |
| 7 | May 26, 2008 | Wrong and Wronger |
| 8 | June 2, 2008 | No Sex in the City |
| 9 | March 10, 2008 | Cherchez la Femme |
| 10 | June 16, 2008 | Trixie's Honour |
| 11 | June 23, 2008 | Baby? What Baby? |
| 12 | June 24, 2008 | My Brother's Keeper |
| 13 | June 30, 2008 | Hero |

== Home media ==
Video Service Corp has released all 3 seasons on DVD in Region 1.

| DVD name | Ep# | Release date |
|---|---|---|
| The Complete First Season | 13 | April 3, 2007 |
| The Complete Second Season | 13 | November 6, 2007 |
| The Complete Third Season | 13 | September 23, 2008 |
