= Canada's Next Great Prime Minister =

Canada's Next Great Prime Minister (formerly The Next Great Prime Minister) is a national contest for young Canadians who wish to share their ideas for making Canada a better, stronger and more prosperous country.

== Format ==
Alex Trebek hosts the reality style show where four young Canadians aged 18–25 are challenged by four political leaders of Canada. The four finalists debate questions posed to them by the politicians. An in-studio audience that represents the Canadian population votes throughout the show and for an ultimate winner of the competition.

== Prizes ==
In the 2008 show, the winner of the competition received a $50,000 cash award and 6 month internship with Magna. Second, third and fourth place contestants each receive a cheque for $5,000 from Magna.

== History ==
The televised contest, which debuted in February 2006, is the evolution of the As Prime Minister Awards essay contest, which provided a national forum for the innovative ideas of Canadian college and university students. The original As Prime Minister Awards essay contest was first founded in 1995 by Magna International Inc. Chairman Frank Stronach. Canadian college and university students were asked to submit a 2,500-word essay on what they would do as Prime Minister of Canada.

With the old essay contest, ten entrants from across the country were selected as Regional Winners by a National Panel of Judges composed of accomplished Canadians with backgrounds in business, academia, media and government affairs. Each National Finalist received a $10,000 cash award, a $15,000 internship, and had his or her proposal published in a book. One of the ten students was declared the National Winner and received a $20,000 award and $50,000 internship. All in all, the contest gave away at least $320,000 in prizes, thanks largely to Magna's contribution.

After over a decade of motivating Canadian youth to think about how they would create a stronger and more prosperous country, the organizers decided to change the contest format to video. In the new incarnation, the 2,500 word essay submission is replaced by a 3-5 minute video.

In 2005, representatives of Magna International Inc., the Arthur Kroeger School of Public Affairs at Carleton University and The Dominion Institute judge the contest entrants and select the final five contestants who appear on the televised show. The 2005 winner, and the recipient of a $50,000 first-place cash prize, was determined by four former Canadian prime ministers: Brian Mulroney, Kim Campbell, Joe Clark, and John Turner. The first winner of the contest was the Sudbury, Ontario-born Deirdra McCracken. McCracken, at the time of the contest, was studying political science at Université Laval in Quebec.

In 2006, the show moved from CTVglobemedia to CBC Television where it was hosted by Rick Mercer and watched by one million Canadians. Representatives of Magna International, The Dominion Institute, CBC and the Fulbright Program selected four contestants to appear on the show after a cross-country university campus tour. The show aired March 2007 and was judged by four former Canadian prime ministers: Brian Mulroney, Kim Campbell, Joe Clark, and Paul Martin. The in-studio audience awarded first place to Quebec native Joseph Lavoie who received $50,000 and a 6 month internship with Magna International Inc.

In 2007, recruitment for the next show began both in the cross-country campus tour and also online though YouTube. From YouTube videos, ten semi-finalists were selected. These semi-finalists were sent to Toronto to compete in boot camp where four finalists were chosen. CBC released boot camp footage to the public as podcasts. The 2007/2008 show aired March 23 on CBC Television and was judged by Kim Campbell, Paul Martin, John Turner, and Danny Williams. The winner was 25-year-old Metis physician Alika Lafontaine from Saskatchewan. Pam Hrick placed second, followed by Kevin Royal in third and Rahim Moloo in fourth.

== International Sales ==
Bulgarian Public Broadcaster BNT has produced two series of the format with the title "Big Choice".

In June 2009, the German TV Station ZDF broadcast the Show with the title "Ich kann Kanzler"

The format is distributed internationally by DRG.

== Legal BitTorrenting ==
On March 19, 2008, CBC announced that they were going to release a DRM-free copy of the show after the broadcast, making them the first major broadcaster in North America to officially release a prime time show using the protocol.

Canadian law expert Michael Geist noted in a blog post that CBC's announcement could force "the CRTC to face mounting pressure to address net neutrality concerns."

On March 23, 2008 after the broadcast, CBC posted the torrent files to the official show site. Reception was positive, but there were two main criticism: the video files were badly encoded and that Canadian ISPs were throttling BitTorrent downloads.
