= Ken Gord =

Canadian film and television producer (born 1949)

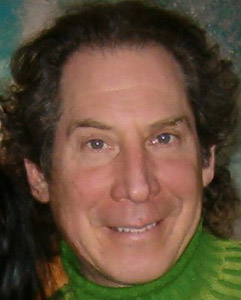
- Gord in 2009
- Born: Kenneth Steven Gord; February 25, 1949 (age 77); Toronto, Ontario, Canada
- Occupations: Film and television producer
- Years active: 1973–present

Kenneth Steven Gord (born February 25, 1949) is a Canadian film and television producer.

== Early years ==
Gord was born in Toronto, Ontario. His parents, Henry and Goldie Gord, were also native Torontonians and Ken was their middle child. Gord graduated from Bathurst Heights Secondary School and then enrolled in the Bachelor of Arts program at the University of Toronto but dropped out after completing the second of three years. He teamed up with two friends and began promoting rock concerts. On October 3, 1969, they successfully brought Johnny Winter to Massey Hall and on October 14, 1969, they brought The Who to the Canadian National Exhibition Colisseum to perform their rock opera Tommy. Other bands brought to Toronto included The Byrds and Pentangle.

== Film ==
Gord became involved in the film industry in Toronto, Ontario in the early 1970s. He produced the ultra-low budget Dream On The Run in 1973 and was production manager on another no-budget Canadian feature Point of No Return. In 1977, he produced the low-budget sci-fi film Starship Invasions, which was distributed by Warner Bros. and in 1979, The High Country for Crown International. He continued to production manage and/or line produce other low-budget films and television shows. Some examples include Deadly Eyes, Loose Screws, Recruits, Busted Up, Mr. Nice Guy, The Housekeeper, The Edison Twins and The Brain, through the 1980s.

In 1986, he was co-producer on Criminal Law, the first feature directed by Martin Campbell, starring Gary Oldman and Kevin Bacon. The movie was produced for Hemdale Film Corporation and distributed by Warner Bros. In 1988, he was the Canadian Executive in Charge of Production on the mini-series Day One, for CBS and Aaron Spelling Productions, which won an Emmy in 1989 for Best Drama Special. In 1991 and 1992, Gord produced two seasons of the CBS late-night crime show Tropical Heat (a.k.a. Sweating Bullets) in Puerto Vallarta, Mexico and Eilat, Israel.

This led him to what he was perhaps best known for, as the producer of the hit syndicated series Highlander: The Series, which filmed six seasons through the 1990s. Mr. Gord was brought in at the beginning of Season 2 and stayed as the creative producer until the last episode was filmed in Paris in 1998. The series was nominated for a Canadian Gemini Award as Best Dramatic Series in 1996.

Since then, he has produced other syndicated series, such as the Paris episodes of Relic Hunter and a season of Queen of Swords, shot in Almeria, Spain at Texas Hollywood. He has also produced over twenty mini-series and television movies for CBS, the Fox Network, UPN, Global Television Network, CTV, Lifetime Network, Paramount Television, Paxnet, Sat-1, Turner Broadcasting, and CLT-ufa. These included CBS's Daughter of Darkness, which starred Anthony Perkins and Model By Day, starring Famke Janssen. In 2006, he produced Eight Days to Live, which was the most successful in-house television movie ever broadcast on CTV, and also broke records on the Lifetime Network. It was nominated for a Canadian Gemini Award as Best Television Movie in 2007.

In 2007, Gord produced Stuck, directed by Stuart Gordon and starring Mena Suvari and Stephen Rea to critical acclaim. The New York Times called it a "...grim, expert little thriller..."

He produced XIII: The Conspiracy, a 4-hour mini-series based on the graphic novel of the same name, starring Val Kilmer. It aired on NBC in Canada during the winter of 2009.

== Filmography ==
Features as producer:

- Stuck (2007 film) (Producer)
- Criminal Law (film), 1988 (co-producer)
- The Brain, 1988 (Line Producer)
- The High Country, 1981 (co-producer)
- Starship Invasions, 1977 (Producer)
- Point of No Return, 1976 (co-producer)
- Dream on the Run, 1973 (Line Producer)

Features as unit production manager:

- Mr. Nice Guy (1987 film), 1987
- The Housekeeper, 1986
- Busted Up, 1986
- Recruits, 1986
- Screwballs II, 1985
- Deadly Eyes, 1982

TV series, pilots, television movies, miniseries as producer or executive in charge of production:

- XIII (miniseries), 2009 (Producer)
- Eight Days to Live, 2006 (Supervising Producer)

- 2007 Gemini Award Nomination - Best TV Movie

- Mary Higgins Clark's All Around The Town, 2002 (Executive in Charge of Production)
- Mary Higgins Clark's Lucky Day, 2002 (Executive in Charge of Production)
- Mary Higgins Clark's Haven't We Met Before?, 2002 (Executive in Charge of Production)
- Mary Higgins Clark's You Belong to Me, 2002 (Executive in Charge of Production)
- Mary Higgins Clark's Pretend You Don't See Her, 2002 (Executive in Charge of Production)
- Mary Higgins Clark's Loves Music, Loves to Dance, 2001 (Executive in Charge of Production)
- Queen of Swords, 2001 (22 Episodes) (Producer)
- Relic Hunter, 2000 (6 Episodes) (Producer)
- Poison, 2000 (Producer)
- Dream Team, 1999 (4 Episodes) (Producer)
- Survivor, 1999 (Supervising Producer)
- Killer Deal, 1999 (Producer)
- The Cyberstalking, 1999 (Producer)
- 30 Years to Life, 1998 (Producer)
- Lost Souls, 1998 (Producer)
- Riddler's Moon, 1998 (Producer)
- Highlander: The Series, 1992-1998 (97 Episodes) (Producer)

- 1996 Emmy Award Nomination – Best Dramatic Series

- Model By Day, 1994 (Producer)
- Split Images, 1992 (Producer)
- Tropical Heat (AKA: Sweating Bullets), 1991-1992 (31 Episodes) (Producer)
- Iran:Days Of Crisis, 1991 (Line Producer(Canada))
- Dog House, 1991 (Line Producer)
- World’s Oldest Living Bridesmaid, 1990 (Executive in Charge of Production
- Daughter of Darkness, 1990 (Line Producer
- Dog House, 1990 (Pilot) (Line Producer)
- Day One (film), 1989 (Executive in Charge of Production (Canada))

- 1989 Emmy – Best Drama Special

TV series, pilots, television movies, miniseries as unit production manager:

- Force III, 1986 (Pilot)
- My Pet Monster, 1986 (Pilot)
- The Edison Twins, 1985

Documentaries:

- Island of Champions (Feature), 2002 (Writer/Director)
- First Class, 1983 (2 x 30 min Pilots) (Producer)

Head of production:

- Paragon Motion Pictures, 1988–1989
- Accent Entertainment, 1990–1991

Writer:

- Silver Cord, 2008 (feature film) - in pre-production
- He Scores, 2000 (Short Story) – Published in anthology An Evening at Joe's, Penguin Putnam
- White Hot, 1992 (Episode of Sweating Bullets)
