= Doc Zone =

Doc Zone is a documentary series on CBC Television which showed both independently produced and in-house productions. It was presented by the author, actor and playwright Ann-Marie MacDonald.

The series started in 2006 and concluded in 2015, after CBC ended in-house documentary production, because of budget cuts. It was replaced with Firsthand, a series which shows externally produced documentaries.
