= Above and Beyond (miniseries) =

- DVD Cover
- Genre: History
- Created by: Pope Productions; Shaftesbury Films
- Written by: John W. Doyle; Lisa Porter
- Directed by: Sturla Gunnarsson
- Starring: Richard E. Grant; Jason Priestley; Liane Balaban
- Theme music composer: Dan Parr
- Country of origin: Canada
- Original language: English
- No. of episodes: 2

Production
- Producers: Paul Pope; Justin Bodle; Scott Garvie
- Editor: Jeff Warren
- Running time: 240 minutes

Original release
- Network: Canadian Broadcasting Corporation (CBC)
- Release: October 29 – October 30, 2006

Above and Beyond is a four-hour 2006 miniseries aired by the Canadian Broadcasting Corporation on October 29 and 30, 2006. It stars Richard E. Grant, Jonathan Scarfe, Liane Balaban, Allan Hawco, Kenneth Welsh and Jason Priestley. The miniseries deals with the Atlantic Ferry Organization, tasked with ferrying aircraft from North America to Europe in the early years of the Second World War.

== Plot ==
In 1940, Canadian weapons of war, including newly manufactured aircraft ordered by the British, have to be delivered to the United Kingdom. Lord Beaverbrook, head of the UK Ministry of Aircraft Production, also arranged for the purchase of aircraft from manufacturers in the United States. Aircraft were first transported to Dorval Airport near Montreal and then flown to RCAF Station Gander in Newfoundland for the transatlantic flight. The initial ferry flight of seven Lockheed Hudson bombers from Gander Airport in Newfoundland took place on November 10, 1940.

In 1941, the Atlantic Ferry Organization was set up, with civilian pilots flying the aircraft to the UK. The organization was handed over to the Air Ministry, becoming the RAF Ferry Command. More than 9,000 aircraft were ferried across the north Atlantic and, by the end of the war, the operation helped make transatlantic flying a safe and commonplace event.

== Cast ==
- Richard E. Grant as Don Bennett, former RAF pilot
- Kenneth Welsh as Lord Beaverbrook, Minister of Aircraft Production
- Joss Ackland as Winston Churchill, UK Prime Minister
- Peter Messaline as Archibald Sinclair, Secretary of State for Air
- Jason Priestley as Sir Frederick Banting
- Jonathan Scarfe as Bill Jacobson
- Liane Balaban as Shelagh Emberly
- Allan Hawco as Nathan Burgess
- Peter MacNeill as USAAF Gen. Anderson
- Robert Wisden as Pritchard, RAF officer
- Aaron Bishop as Pilot #11
- Travis Pritchett as Pilot #10

== Production ==
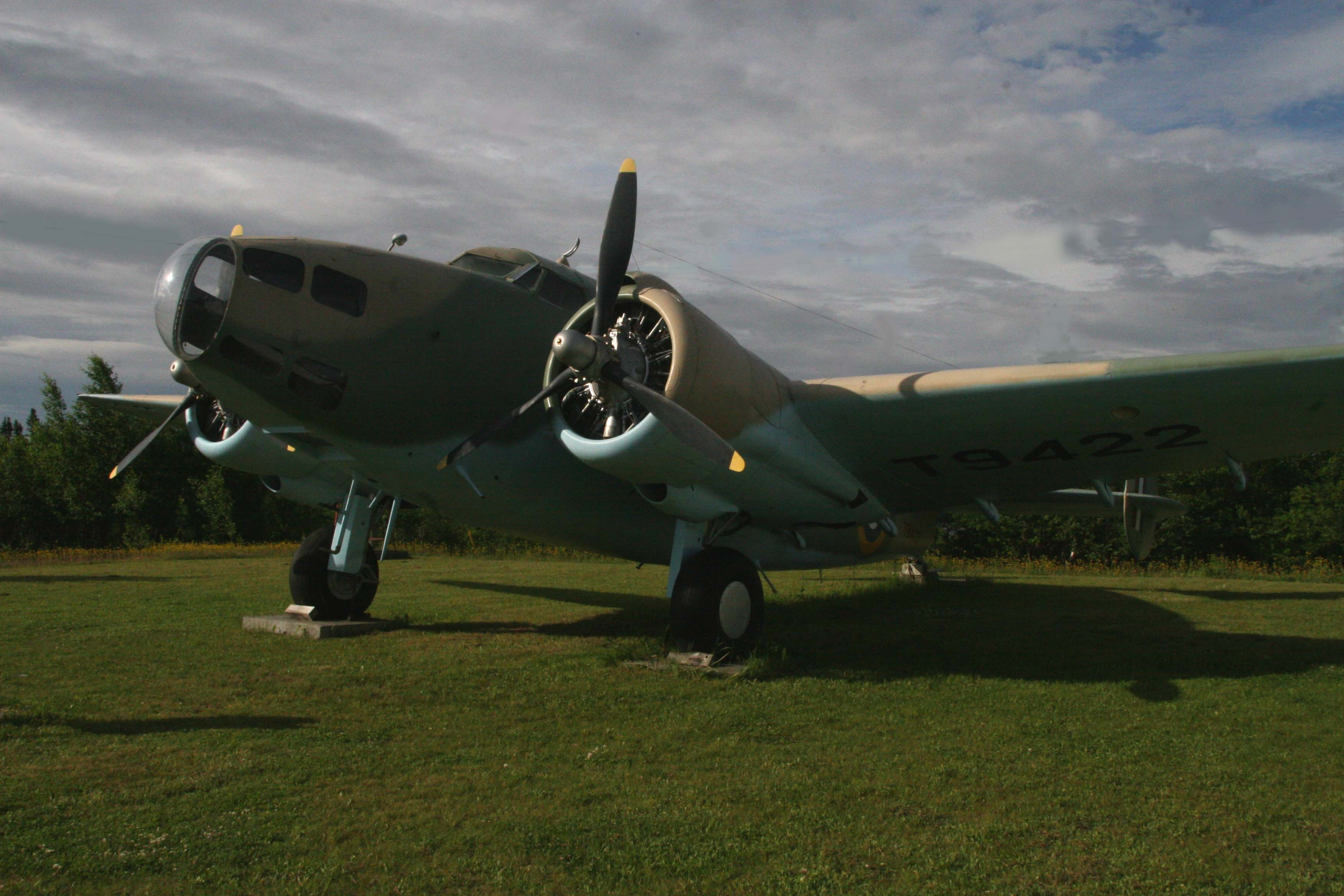
Lockheed Hudson Mk IIIA (T9422) at the North Atlantic Aviation Museum, Gander, Newfoundland appeared in Above and Beyond.

Principal photography for Above and Beyond took place at Gander and St. John's, Newfoundland, Canada. Other locations included Toronto and Hamilton, Ontario, Canada. A period-accurate Lockheed Hudson Mk IIIA bomber belonging to the North Atlantic Aviation Museum in Gander, Newfoundland, featured prominently in the filming. A Beech 18S on display at the museum was also used. The Canadian Warplane Heritage Museum at Mount Hope, Ontario, with an extensive collection of wartime aircraft, was another prominent filming location. All flying scenes were staged with computer-generated imagery.

=== Historical accuracy ===
Despite attention to detail, a number of historical inaccuracies in Above and Beyond were noted. The "B-24" used by the USAAF general is actually an RAF Avro Lancaster bomber. The DC-3 shown in the first hour is equipped with modern turboprop engines. One scene shows a de Havilland Chipmunk trainer in a hangar but there were none in service in 1940; the first one flew in 1946.

Other discrepancies include the American general wearing five stars indicating the rank of General of the Army, a grade only achieved during the Second World War by Army Air Corps officer Hap Arnold, in 1944. A modern dial tone could be heard during overseas telephone calls between Bennett and Lord Beaverbrook. Air-traffic control equipment under repair contained TO-3 transistors instead of thermionic valves.

== Reception ==
Above and Beyond was well received. Reviewer Andrew Melomet noted, "If you're looking for a historical drama covering an overlooked and previously untold story, you'll enjoy Above and Beyond."

== Awards ==
- Directors Guild of Canada's Craft Awards:
  - Direction - Television Movie/Mini-Series — Sturla Gunnarsson (won)
  - Picture Editing - Television Movie/Mini-Series — Jeff Warren (won)
  - Sound Editing - Television Movie/Mini-Series — David Rose, Kathy Choi, Jane Tattersall (nominated)
- Academy of Canadian Cinema and Television's Gemini Awards:
  - Best Performance by an Actor in a Featured Supporting Role in a Dramatic Program or Mini-Series — Jonathan Scarfe (won)
  - Best Original Music Score for a Program or Mini-Series — Jonathan Goldsmith (nominated)
  - Best Production Design or Art Direction in a Fiction Program or Series — Pam Hall, Ane Christensen (nominated)
  - Best Sound in a Dramatic Program — Henry Embry, Steph Carrier, Ronayne Higginson, Dino Pigat, David Rose, Jane Tattersall (nominated)
  - Best Visual Effects — Peter Evans, Darryl Couch, Chris Darlington, Mike Mombourquette, Michael Skiffington, John Vatcher, David Woodrow (nominated)
  - Best Writing in a Dramatic Program or Mini-Series — John W. Doyle, Lisa Porter (nominated)
- Writers Guild of Canada's WGC Awards:
  - MOW & Miniseries — John W. Doyle, Lisa Porter (won)

== See also ==
- North Atlantic air ferry route in World War II
