= Mark Grilliot =

American musician (born 1989)

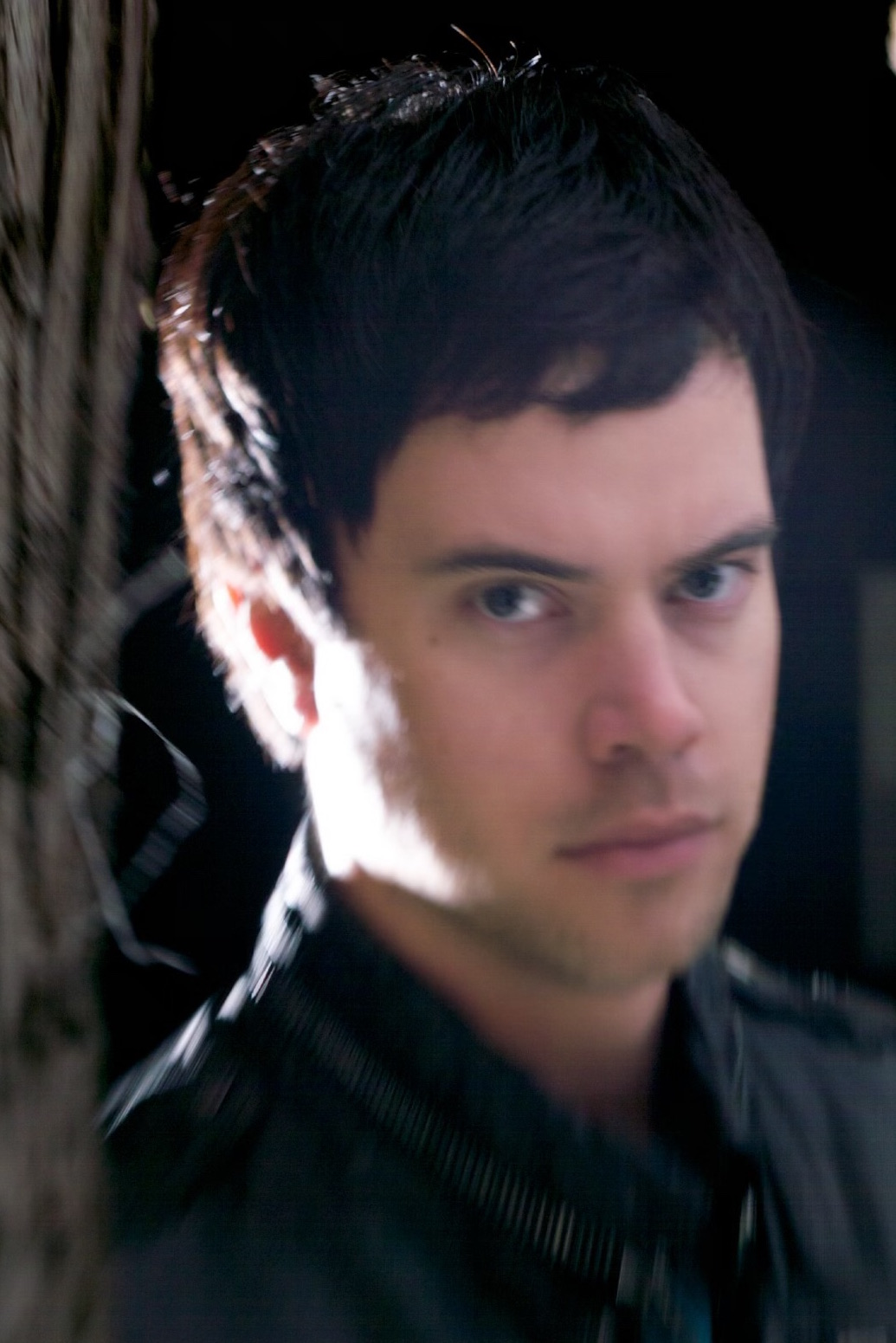
- Grilliot in October 2016
- Born: Mark Adam Grilliot; April 10, 1989 (age 37); Dayton, Ohio, U.S.
- Education: Indiana University (B.M.)
- Occupation: Musician

Mark Adam Grilliot is an American musician. He is known for his songwriting and music production on the Universal Pictures movie R.L. Stine's Monsterville: Cabinet of Souls, and the Disney film Radio Rebel.

== Early life and education ==
Grilliot was born in Dayton, Ohio. While growing up, Grilliot was an honor student and learned the fundamentals of choral singing and arranging, trumpet, bass, guitar, piano, and jazz studies; he received his high school diploma in Celina, Ohio. Grilliot graduated summa cum laude with a Bachelor of Music degree from Indiana University and focused on Music Production and Business.

== Career ==
Grilliot began his professional musical career in Nashville, Tennessee, appearing as bass player with the BMG band "Lightheaded." He began studio work as engineer for D'andre "Po-Po" Smith of Pop, Lock, & Drop It notoriety. Grilliot has appeared on stage with the Columbia Records band Revolution One as their bass player.

Grilliot relocated to Los Angeles in 2008 and began producing music for Kat Graham on her YouTube covers of artists such as Janet Jackson and Paula Abdul. He also handled vocal production and engineering when Graham contributed a cover of the Garbage song "Only Happy When It Rains" to The Vampire Diaries soundtrack. The song premiered in December 2010 in an episode of the series titled "The Sacrifice". In March 2011, Graham released another single titled "I Want It All" produced by Grilliot with Kazual and J.R. Rotem. He also produced "We Ended Right" for Debby Ryan with Chase Ryan and Chad Hively. In 2015, he was commissioned to produce the Katherine McNamara single "Stay True" for the Universal Pictures film R.L. Stine's Monsterville: Cabinet of Souls. He also produced music for David Hernandez of American Idol including his single “Beautiful.” YouTube artists followed including Kenny Holland and Nickelodeon star Paul Butcher.

Grilliot also has television and film placements on programming including American Horror Story, Botched, and The Real Housewives.
