= Brent Butt =

Canadian actor, comedian, and writer

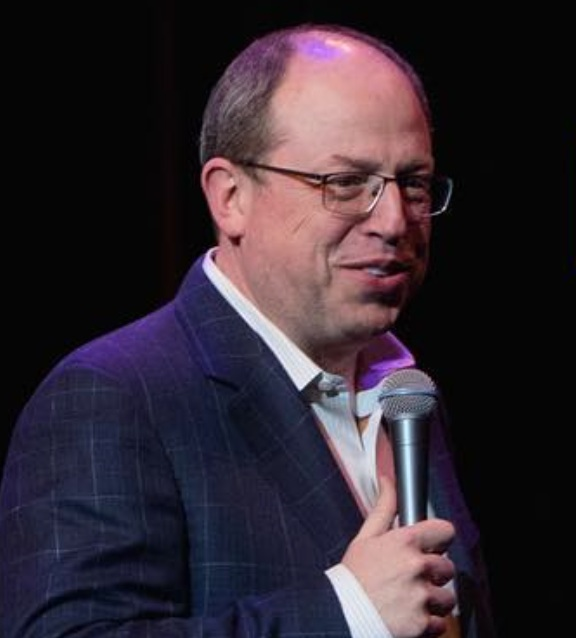
- Butt performing at Casino Regina
- Born: Brent Leroy Butt; August 3, 1966 (age 60); Tisdale, Saskatchewan, Canada
- Occupations: Actor; comedian; screenwriter
- Years active: 1989–present
- Notable credit: Corner Gas (2004–2009)
- Spouse: Nancy Robertson (m. 2005)
- Website: brentbutt.com

Brent Leroy Butt (born August 3, 1966) is a Canadian actor, comedian, and writer. He is best known for his role as Brent Leroy on the CTV sitcom Corner Gas, which he created. He also created the television series Hiccups and wrote the 2013 film No Clue. In 2023, he released his debut novel, Huge, a psychological thriller about touring comedians.

== Early life ==
Butt was born on August 3, 1966, in Tisdale, Saskatchewan to Irene (née Harrison) and Herbert Butt. He attended Tisdale Unit Composite School. After graduating, Butt briefly attended Ontario's Sheridan College before returning to his home in Saskatchewan.

== Career ==
While working as a drywaller, Butt and a friend started a publishing company, Windwolf Graphics. His comic, Existing Earth, was nominated for an Eagle Award. They published two issues before running out of money.

In February 1988, Butt performed stand-up comedy for the first time at an amateur night at a Saskatoon comedy club. He then began performing in the Yuk Yuk's chain in Western Canada, before moving to Toronto in 1989, where he performed at the Yuk Yuk's there, living in a Cabbagetown apartment with two other comedians.

Butt presented stand-up performances for CTV, CBC Television, CBC Radio's Definitely Not the Opera, and The Comedy Network in Canada, as well as A&E in the United States and the Special Broadcasting Service in Australia. He composed a number of prairie-oriented funny or "folksy" songs, including "Nothing Rhymes with Saskatchewan" and "Hairy Legs".

In 2003, through his production company Prairie Pants, Butt co-created the CTV television series Corner Gas, set in his home province of Saskatchewan. He starred in the show as Brent Leroy from 2004 to 2009.

On May 19, 2005, Butt hosted a Royal Command Performance gala for Queen Elizabeth II and Prince Philip, Duke of Edinburgh, held in Saskatoon, Saskatchewan, to celebrate the Canadian province's centennial. He performed his song "Nothing Rhymes with Saskatchewan" and traded jokes with Leslie Nielsen. That year, he also hosted the Juno Awards.

In 2008, Butt and Prairie Pants made the decision to end Corner Gas after its sixth year, which aired during the 2008–2009 season.

At the World Television Festival in Banff, Alberta, Butt was given the Comedy Network Sir Peter Ustinov Award which is presented in recognition of a significant body of comedic work. Past recipients include John Cleese, Bob Newhart, John Candy, and Eugene Levy.

Butt also wrote and produced a comedy series for CTV, from 2010 to 2011, entitled Hiccups. The series starred Nancy Robertson as Millie Upton, a children's author who begins seeing a life coach to deal with her anger management issues.

On July 25, 2010, Butt starred in the one-hour Comedy Network special The Brent Butt Comedy Special, which featured on guest stars Seth Rogen, Dave Foley, and Jully Black.

In 2014, Butt co-wrote and co-executive produced the film, Corner Gas: The Movie, which was released in theatres and on CTV on December that year. He also reprised the role of Brent Leroy. The film included cameo appearances by several Canadian TV personalities as well as Academy Award nominee Graham Greene and Will Sasso.

In April 2018, Butt's follow-up series Corner Gas Animated premiered on The Comedy Network.

In 2023 Butt's debut novel was published, Huge, a psychological thriller set among stand-up comedians on tour.

== Personal life ==
Butt is married to his Corner Gas and Hiccups co-star Nancy Robertson. The two married in 2005.

== Awards and nominations ==
Butt has won four Canadian Comedy Awards, for Best Male Stand-up (2001), Best Male TV Performance (Corner Gas, 2004–05), and Best Writing – TV Series (Corner Gas, 2004). The Comedy Network Sir Peter Ustinov Award was awarded to Butt at the Banff World Television Festival in 2008.

== Filmography ==
=== Film ===
Year	Title	Role	Notes
1999	Dudley Do-Right	A Bad Guy in the back	
2000	Screwed	Buddy	
2000	Duets	Hotel clerk	
2000	Comedy Club	Bob Pooley	
2001	Rider Pride	Les P.	Short film
2013	No Clue	Leo Falloon	Writer; Producer
2014	Corner Gas: The Movie	Brent Leroy	Co-writer; Co-executive producer

=== Television ===
Year	Title	Role	Notes
1992	Maniac Mansion	Applicant #1	Season 3 episode 6: "Science Is Only Skin Deep"
1992	The Kids in the Hall	Barfly	Episode #3.11
1993	Kung Fu: The Legend Continues	Baker	Uncredited; Season 1 episode 10: "Rain's Only Friend"
1993	Comics!	Himself	
1995–1996	Get Serious: Seven Deadly Sins		7 episodes Writer – 5 episodes
1997	Millennium	Short order cook	Season 2, episode 2: "Beware of the Dog"
1997	Howling at the Moon		TV movie
1997	Comedy Now!	Himself	Title: "Funny Pants"
1998	X-Files	Coroner	Season 5, episode 12: "Bad Blood"
1998	The Improv Comedy Olympics	Host	
1999	Cool Undercover	Security guard	TV movie
1999	The Metrix	Jasper	TV movie
1999	Chill		TV movie
2000	Cream of Comedy	Host	
2000	Becoming Dick	Businessman #2	TV movie
2001	Big Sound	Todd	3 episodes
2003	Cold Squad	Barry	Season 6, episode 12: "True Believers: Part 1"
2003	Canadian Comedy Awards	Himself	Writer
2004–2009	Corner Gas	Brent Leroy	Creator; Director – 5 episodes Executive producer
2005	Robson Arms	Reeves	Season 1, episode 7: "Hairpiece of Mind"
2005	Beyond Corner Gas: Tales from Dog River	Himself	Creator; Writer; Executive producer
2009	It's Been a Gas	Himself/Brent Leroy	Executive producer
2010–2011	Hiccups	Stan Dirko	Creator; Writer; Executive producer Director – 4 episodes
2011	Winnipeg Comedy Festival		Episode: "Misfortune Tellers"; Writer
2013	Leo Awards	Himself	Writer
2018	The Social	Himself	Guest co-host on the March 28, 2018 episode
2018–2021	Corner Gas Animated	Brent Leroy	Creator; Co-writer; Co-executive producer
