= Nancy Robertson (actress) =

Canadian actress

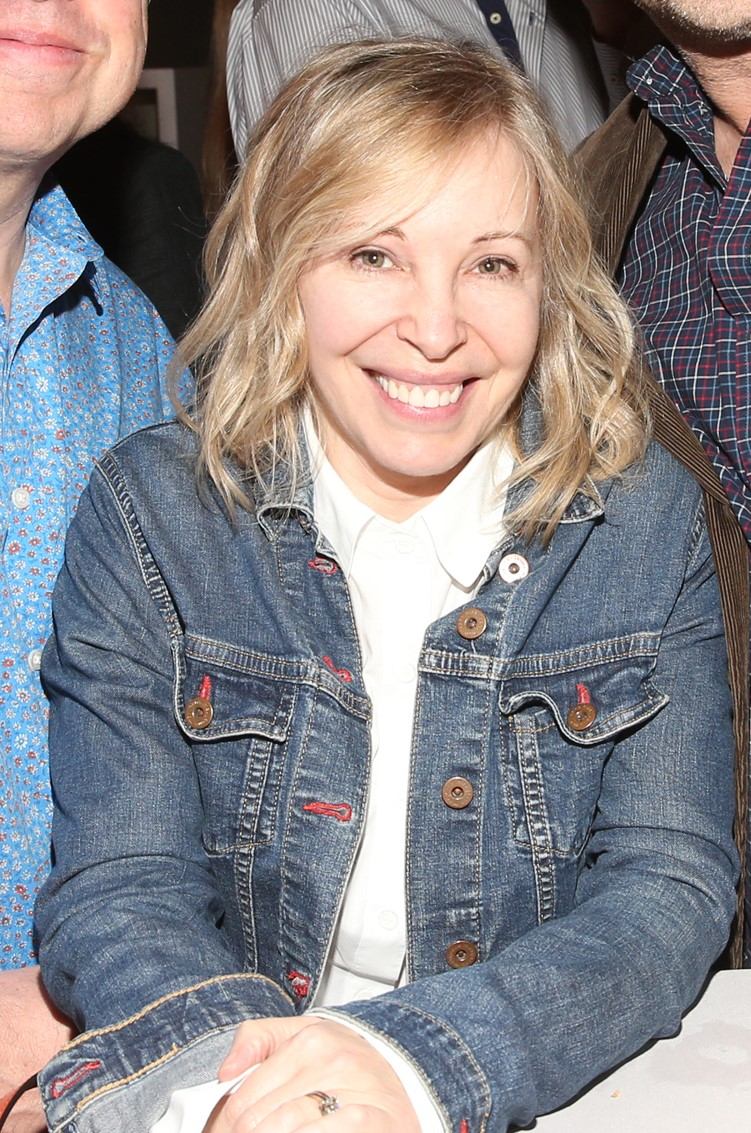
- Robertson in 2017
- Born: 1962 (age 63–64); Vancouver, British Columbia, Canada
- Occupation: Actress
- Notable credit: Corner Gas (2004–2009)
- Spouse: Brent Butt (m. 2005)

Nancy Lee Robertson is a Canadian actress, best known for her roles as Wanda Dollard in the television series Corner Gas and Millie Upton in the series Hiccups, both of which were created by and starred her husband, Brent Butt.

== Early life ==
Robertson was born and raised in Vancouver, British Columbia. She studied drama at Point Grey Secondary School and went on to attend the Breck Academy and The Vancouver Arts Club Theatre Program.

== Career ==
Robertson's television career began with the CBC sketch comedy series The 11th Hour. She later played temperamental parking attendant Harriet Sharpe in the mockumentary film The Delicate Art of Parking; her fellow parking attendant, Grant Parker, is played by Fred Ewanuick, who later co-starred with Robertson in Corner Gas.

From 2004 to 2009, Robertson played Wanda Dollard, an intelligent and sarcastic gas station attendant, on the hit Canadian television series Corner Gas. In 2010, Robertson's husband and Corner Gas co-star, Brent Butt created a new television series, Hiccups. The show's lead role, a children's author with anger-management issues, was not initially written with Robertson in mind, but she decided to take on the role upon reading the script. The second and final season of Hiccups ended on 28 August 2011. Robertson played the role of Principal Moreno in the television movie Radio Rebel.

Robertson is an alumna of the Vancouver TheatreSports League improvisational comedy troupe.

== Personal life ==
On 19 November 2005, Robertson married her Corner Gas and Hiccups co-star Brent Butt. They live in Vancouver.

== Filmography ==
| Year | Title | Role | Notes |
|---|---|---|---|
| 1999 | Beggars and Choosers | Dolores | |
| 1999 | The New Addams Family | Samantha | |
| 1999 | 11th Hour | Nancy Lee | |
| 2000 | Big Sound | Woman at House | |
| 2000 | Hollywood Off-Ramp | Audience Member #2 | |
| 2000–2001 | Los Luchadores | Gertrude | |
| 2001 | Till Debt Do Us Part (TV movie) | Jessica | |
| 2001 | Cold Squad | Patti | |
| 2002 | My Guide to Becoming a Rock Star | | |
| 2003 | The Delicate Art of Parking | Harriet Sharpe | Nominated – Leo award for Best Supporting Performance by a Female in a Feature Length Drama or Series (2004) |
| 2003 | Dead Like Me | Monroco Secretary | |
| 2003 | Air Bud Spikes Back | Principal Pickle | |
| 2003 | Out of Order | Juror with New York accent | |
| 2003 | The Mall Man (short) | Cashier | |
| 2004–2009 | Corner Gas | Wanda Dollard | Nominated – Gemini award for Best Ensemble Performance in a Comedy Program or Series (2004); Nominated – Canadian Comedy Award for Pretty Funny Female Performance (Television) (2005); Nominated – Leo award for Best Performance or Host(s) in a Music, Comedy or Variety Program or Series (2005); Nominated – Leo award for Best Performance or Host(s) in a Music, Comedy or Variety Program or Series (2006); Nominated – Gemini award for Best Ensemble Performance in a Comedy Program or Series (2006); Won – Gemini award for Best Ensemble Performance in a Comedy Program or Series (2007); Nominated – Leo award for Best Performance or Host(s) in a Music, Comedy or Variety Program or Series (2007); Nominated – Leo award for Best Performance or Host(s) in a Music, Comedy or Variety Program or Series (2008); Won – Leo award for Best Performance or Host(s) in a Music, Comedy or Variety Program or Series (2009) |
| 2004 | The Life | Tiny | |
| 2004 | No One Ever Suspects the Chinese Guy (short) | | |
| 2005–2007 | Robson Arms | Cindy | |
| 2005 | Oh, Baby (TV movie) | Cop #2 | |
| 2005 | Are We There Yet? | Lady Airport Cop | |
| 2008 | Christmas Cottage | Deputy Hornbuckle | |
| 2009 | Alice | Dormouse | |
| 2010–2011 | Hiccups | Millie Upton | Nominated – Canadian Comedy Award for Best Performance by a Female (Television) (2011) |
| 2010 | Ramona and Beezus | Casting Associate | |
| 2012 | Radio Rebel | Principal Moreno | Disney Channel Original Movie |
| 2013 | No Clue | Phyllis | Guest Star |
| 2014 | Corner Gas: The Movie | Wanda Dollard | Reprise of role from 2004 to 2009 TV series |
| 2018–2021 | Corner Gas Animated | Wanda Dollard | Reprise of role from 2004 to 2009 TV series |
| 2020 | The Willoughbys | Irene Holmes | |
| 2021 | Flora & Ulysses | Tootie Tickham | Disney+ Original |
| 2023 | Lucky Hank | Billie | AMC |
| 2026 | Family Law (Canadian TV series) | Danita | Global |
