= Hiccups (TV series) =

- Genre: Sitcom
- Created by: Brent Butt
- Starring: Nancy Robertson; Laura Soltis; David Ingram; Emily Perkins; Paula Rivera; Brent Butt
- Country of origin: Canada
- Original language: English
- No. of seasons: 2
- No. of episodes: 26 (and 10 webisodes)

Production
- Executive producers: Brent Butt; Laura Lightbown; David Storey
- Production locations: Vancouver, British Columbia, Canada
- Running time: 30 minutes

Original release
- Network: CTV; The Comedy Network
- Release: March 1, 2010 – August 28, 2011

Hiccups is a Canadian television sitcom created by Corner Gas star Brent Butt, who is also the writer, show runner, and executive producer of the program. The series was produced by Laura Lightbown and David Storey and airs on CTV and The Comedy Network. The pilot was shot in late March 2009 with the rest of the series to begin shooting in September 2009. The show premiered on CTV on March 1, 2010; the same night as Dan for Mayor, a series starring fellow Corner Gas alumnus Fred Ewanuick. Hiccups returned for a second season on May 30, 2011, at 8pm ET. CTV did not renew Hiccups and Dan for Mayor for a third season.

== Synopsis ==
The series stars Nancy Robertson (a Corner Gas co-star and Butt's wife) in the role of Millie Upton. Millie is the successful author of a series of children's books about characters called "Grumpaloos". Millie has anger management issues, which are referred to as "hiccups," giant outbursts and could be described as a giant fit of depression. These outbursts are immediate, so they are prone to happen at any time. After being told that she needs some help controlling her anger issues, Millie finds a man named Stan Dirko (Butt), whom she hires as her life coach. Stan is significantly underqualified for his profession, which Millie never notices.

== Characters ==
- Nancy Robertson as Millie Upton, a neurotic, emotionally-unstable children's author who is often happy but quick to anger.
- Brent Butt as Stan Dirko, Millie's life coach. Stan is a bit of a loveable loser, geeky, and quirky.
- Laura Soltis as Joyce Haddison, Millie's publisher; a serious, thriving businessperson surrounded by colourful characters.
- David Ingram as Taylor Rymes, Millie's literary agent; a slick, smooth-talking, conceited guy who is more interested in women than his job.
- Emily Perkins as Crystal Braywood, a spoiled, sarcastic rich girl who strongly dislikes her job as Joyce's receptionist.
- Paula Rivera as Anna Dirko, Stan's loveable wife, a professional gardener.

== Episodes ==
=== Season 1 (2010) ===
No. overall	No. in season	Title	Directed by	Written by	Original release date	Prod. code
1	1	"Millie, Meet Stan"	David Storey	Brent Butt	March 1, 2010	101
After causing a public disturbance at a coffee shop, children's author Millie Upton seeks help from Stan Dirko, an inexperienced but enthusiastic life coach. Despite his ineptitude, Stan manages to gain Millie's trust as a client, just as her publisher Joyce threatens to cancel an important event unless Millie finds the help she needs.
2	2	"Strata's Fear"	Robert de Lint	Brent Butt	March 8, 2010	102
Stan aids Millie when she gets in trouble with her condo council. At Haddison House, Joyce promises to look at some of Taylor's clients if he promises to find someone to save her dying plants.
3	3	"Office Clothes"	David Storey	Brent Butt	March 15, 2010	103
Millie wreaks havoc on Haddison House when Joyce makes her work in the office until her latest manuscript is finished. Stan enlists Taylor's help in proving to Anna that he has good fashion sense.
4	4	"Speed Ball"	David Storey	Dylan Wertz	March 22, 2010	104
Stan helps Millie expand her social circle by introducing her to speed-dating, but she takes the "7-minute date" concept to a whole new level. Joyce and Crystal plan a party at Haddison House but can't decide on the budget.
5	5	"Hot Luv"	James Dunnison	Andrew Carr	March 28, 2010	105
Stan is concerned with Millie's competitiveness when she and Taylor go head-to-head in a hot-food-eating rivalry. Meanwhile, since Joyce isn't a good judge of fantasy-romance manuscripts, she hands the job of picking their next book to Crystal, who proclaims herself an expert on the genre.
6	6	"Carry on Camping"	David Storey	Chris Finn	April 5, 2010	106
Joyce books Millie on her favourite daytime talk show but soon regrets her decision when Millie speaks before thinking. Stan takes a reluctant Anna on a camping trip and she deals with his lack of wilderness skills.
7	7	"Thanks For Nuttin"	David Storey	Andrew Carr	April 12, 2010	107
Millie becomes disillusioned after not being thanked for returning a lost wallet and Stan tries to convince her that doing a good deed is its own reward. At Haddison House, Crystal stocks up on Joyce's favourite snack to prevent her from turning into a total witch and Taylor wrangles Anna into helping him buy a bobblehead online.
8	8	"Watch and Learn"	Brent Butt	Brent Butt	April 19, 2010	108
When Millie hires Crystal to re-decorate her condo she gets into another tiff with her neighbour Lewis and vows to beat him at his own persnickety game. Stan attempts to help Joyce with one of her issues in order to prove that he's capable of being Millie's life coach.
9	9	"Hippy Anniversary"	Carl Bessai	David Moses	April 26, 2010	109
Stan is in the doghouse with Anna after refusing to accept an extravagant anniversary gift from Millie. Meanwhile, Joyce and Taylor have to deal with a head shop that's selling illegal Grumpaloo merchandise, and Crystal is up to her neck in Millie's fan mail.
10	10	"Model Patient"	David Storey	Dylan Wertz & David Moses	June 7, 2010	110
Taylor is having personal issues so Millie happily recommends that he see Stan. But she soon realizes that the more time Stan spends with Taylor the less he spends with her. Joyce must find a model for an upcoming book cover and her choice to use Anna does not sit well with Crystal.
11	11	"Autograph Hound"	Robert De Lint	Dan Redican	June 14, 2010	111
Stan accompanies Millie on a mission to give a young fan an autograph. Joyce and Taylor negotiate Millie's contract, and Anna and Crystal see this as a golden opportunity to mess with Taylor's head.
12	12	"Dream Gig"	James Dunnison	Dylan Wertz	June 21, 2010	112
Stan attempts to analyze Millie's dreams but he grows concerned when they depict him in a negative light. Joyce is nervous when Taylor signs her uncle to be the first client at his new talent agency.
13	13	"You Schmooze, You Lose"	Brent Butt	Andrew Carr	June 28, 2010	113
Stan tries to teach Millie how to be successful at losing when she's nominated for a Literary Award. Taylor shows Joyce a thing or two about schmoozing a potential client while Anna and Crystal spend the evening over-embellishing stories about their lives to strangers.

=== Season 2 (2011) ===
No. overall	No. in season	Title	Directed by	Written by	Original release date	Prod. code	CAN. viewers (millions)
14	1	"Hollywood Makeup"	David Storey	Brent Butt	May 30, 2011	201	0.574
When Stan and Millie travel to Hollywood to preview a Grumpaloo movie, Millie beats up a guy dressed in a Grumpaloo costume for being drunk and crabby. Anna and Crystal test homemade skin-care products from Joyce. Trying to get bids from other studios, Taylor learns he's speaking to low-totem-pole people.
15	2	"Talking Points"	David Storey	Andrew Carr	June 6, 2011	202	0.386
When Millie is turned off from speaking publicly, Stan must dig up a coaching trick to help her. Taylor tries to convince Joyce and other Haddison House employees to buy into his scheme.
16	3	"Gym Dandy"	Carl Bessai	Brent Butt	June 19, 2011	203	0.344
Millie makes a gym in her condo and invites others to join her. Taylor reacts to Joyce questioning his masculinity.
17	4	"Commercial Success"	David Storey	Brent Butt	June 26, 2011	204	0.370
Taylor and Millie venture to make a television commercial. Stan doesn't like Joyce mentoring Anna with her business.
18	5	"Hypnofish"	David Storey	David Moses	July 3, 2011	205	0.465
Millie encourages Stan to learn the art of hypnotism so he can make her quack like a duck. Anna cares for Haddison House's new aquarium, and Taylor turns the whole office against Joyce and her fish.
19	6	"Novel Idea"	Carl Bessai	Chris Finn	July 10, 2011	206	0.193
After being insulted by a mystery author, Millie tries to write a novel to prove her worth as a writer, and Anna proves more helpful than Stan at coming up with story ideas. An older Frenchwoman teaches Taylor a lesson in sex appeal.
20	7	"Flirt Locker"	James Dunnison	David Moses	July 17, 2011	207	0.294
Millie discovers a storage locker at her condo and decides to use it for a clubhouse; Joyce and Anna try to stop Taylor's latest scheme: getting girls to do him favours.
21	8	"Sexual Healing"	Rachel Talalay	Andrew Carr	July 24, 2011	208	0.326
Joyce and Anna ask Millie to detoxify her system with a cleanse; they join as a sign of support but suffer the consequences. Taylor asks Stan for help with his sex addiction.
22	9	"Home Swapping"	James Dunnison	Dylan Wertz	July 31, 2011	209	0.439
Millie moves in with Stan and Anna when her ant farm is destroyed, but she doesn't fit in and must go elsewhere. Taylor helps Joyce find the perfect receptionist.
23	10	"Moving Pictures"	Brent Butt	Dylan Wertz	August 7, 2011	210	0.296
Millie insults a celebrity dog, which embarrasses Joyce. A new couch takes over Stan and Anna's apartment; and Stan tries to get Taylor to move furniture without taking advantage of, or bonding with, him.
24	11	"Car Pool"	David Storey	Andrew Carr	August 14, 2011	211	0.314
Seeking revenge on her neighbour Lewis for beating her at billiards, Millie turns to Taylor and Anna to improve her game. Stan gets involved when Joyce's carpool buddies criticize her driving skills.
25	12	"Welcome Back Potter"	David Storey	Andrew Carr, David Moses & Dylan Wertz	August 21, 2011	212	0.492
Crystal returns to work and takes advantage of Millie's good nature; meanwhile a file Joyce needs gets shredded. Stan and Taylor attend a pottery class with Anna.
26	13	"Wake the Baby"	Brent Butt	David Moses & Dylan Wertz	August 28, 2011	213	0.341
Attending her mentor's funeral makes Millie want a living funeral for herself; offering to help struggling Crystal and her boyfriend gets Stan stuck babysitting.

=== Webisodes ===
A series of 10 webisodes was produced and premiered on the official Hiccups YouTube channel.

No.	Title	Directed by	Written by
1	"Choco Bell"	Brent Butt	Andrew Carr
Stan attempts to get a point across to Millie using Pavlovian reinforcement.
2	"Light Bright"	Brent Butt	Andrew Carr
Stan suspects that Seasonal Affective Disorder may be affecting Millie, and conducts a light therapy session with her.
3	"Vanity Unfair"	Brent Butt	Andrew Carr
Millie tries out positive affirmation, to much success.
4	"Meditation Blues"	Brent Butt	David Moses
Millie participates in an abruptly short meditation session.
5	"Coming Up Rosie"	Brent Butt	Brent Butt
Millie's new crimson glasses relieve stress from her daily life.
6	"In Stan We Trust"	Brent Butt	David Moses
Stan attempts to regain Millie's trust, after a failed trust fall.
7	"Shock And Flaw"	Brent Butt	Dylan Wertz
In attempt to reduce her use of profanity, Millie decides to treat herself with the use of a shock collar.
8	"Placebo Domingo"	Brent Butt	Dylan Wertz
Millie begins hallucinating immediately after taking a pill from Stan.
9	"Guilt by Word Association"	Brent Butt	Dylan Wertz
Stan attempts to help Millie through a case of writer's block through Word Association.
10	"Ink Stink"	Brent Butt	Shannon Komra Eert
Stan administers an ink blot test to a preoccupied Millie.

== Home release ==
Entertainment One released Season One on DVD in Region 1 on January 11, 2011.

== Reception ==
Rob Salem of the Toronto Star stated that, "What the network may perceive as Hiccups' greatest asset turns out to be its greatest liability. Butt's appearance onscreen – which he was, I gather, reluctantly persuaded to do by the network – is a distraction from this singular showcase for his wife's considerable comedic skills."

=== Canadian ratings ===
==== Seasonal ratings ====
Season	Timeslot	Season premiere	Season finale	TV season	Viewers (100'000s)	Rank
1	Monday 8:00PM	March 1, 2010	June 29, 2010	2010	9.72	#1

==== Episodic ratings ====
#	Episode	Viewers (millions)	Rank (Week)
1	"Millie, Meet Stan"	1.90	15
2	"Strata's Fear"	1.16	n/a
8	"Watch and Learn"	0.49	n/a
10	"Model Patient"	0.30	n/a
13	"You Schmooze, You Lose"	0.50	n/a

== Awards and nominations ==
Year	Presenter	Award	Work	Result
2010	Gemini Awards	Best Photography in a Comedy, Variety, Performing Arts Program or Series	Anton Krawczyk	Nominated
2011	Canadian Comedy Awards	Best Performance By a Female - Television	Nancy Robertson - Hiccups	Nominated
2011	Leo Awards	Best Music, Comedy, or Variety Program or Series	Brent Butt, David Storey, Laura Lightbown, Nancy Robertson, Arvi Liimatainen	Won
2011	Leo Awards	Best Direction in a Music, Comedy, or Variety Program or Series	James Dunnison	Won
2011	Leo Awards	Best Screenwriting in a Music, Comedy, or Variety Program or Series	David Moses	Won
2011	Leo Awards	Best Picture Editing in a Music, Comedy, or Variety Program or Series	Lisa Binkley	Won
2011	Leo Awards	Best Performance or Host(s) in a Music, Comedy, or Variety Program or Series	Nancy Robertson	Won
2012	Leo Awards	Best Music, Comedy, or Variety Program or Series	Brent Butt, Nancy Robertson, David Storey, Laura Lightbown, Arvi Liimatainen	Won
2012	Leo Awards	Best Screenwriting in a Music, Comedy, or Variety Program or Series	Brent Butt	Nominated
2012	Leo Awards	Best Performance or Host(s) in a Music, Comedy, or Variety Program or Series	Nancy Robertson	Nominated
2012	Young Artist Awards	Best Performance in a TV Series - Guest Starring Young Actor 14–17	Donnie MacNeil	Nominated
