= The Improv Centre =

Canadian theatre company

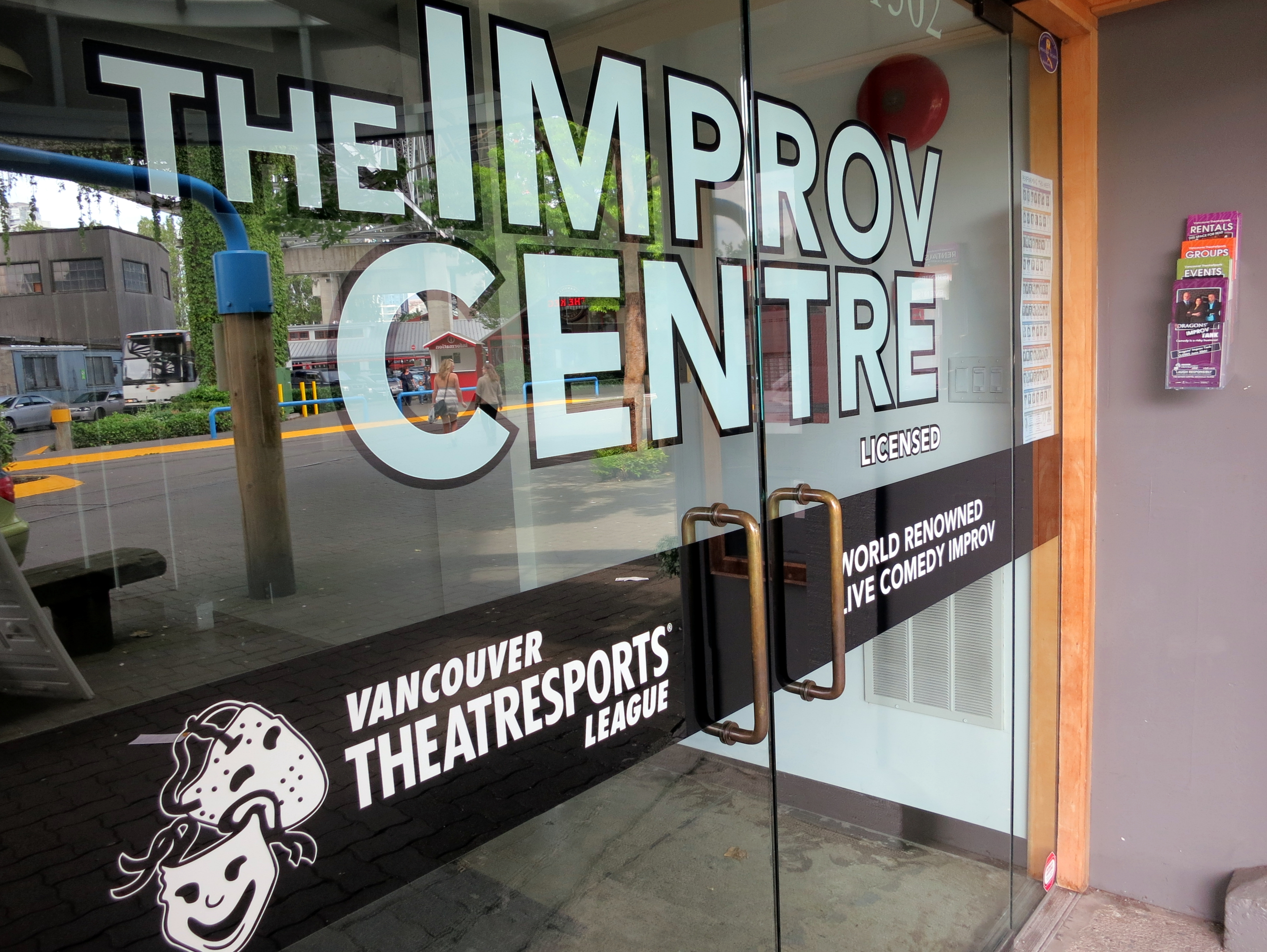
The Improv Centre theatre in 2012

The Improv Centre (previously called the Vancouver TheatreSports League) is an improvisational theatre company in Vancouver, Canada. The company was founded in 1981 out of the Back Alley Theatre, then moved to the Granville Island Revue Stage in the 1990s. In 2011, the company opened its own theatre on Granville Island called “The Improv Centre”. The name of the company was changed from the “Vancouver TheatreSports League” to “The Improv Centre” in 2021.

Past members of the company include Lori Dungey, Colin Mochrie, Nancy Robertson, Ian Boothby, Roman Danylo, Ellie Harvie, Richard Side, Veena Sood, Ryan Stiles, and Denalda Williams.
