= Debby Ryan =

American actress and singer (born 1993)

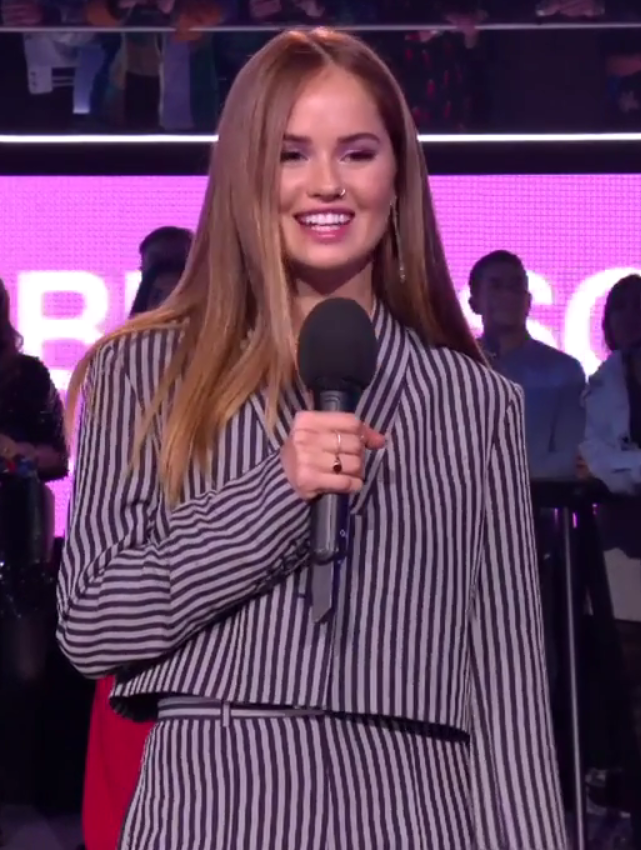
- Ryan during the 2018 MTV Europe Music Awards
- Born: Deborah Ann Ryan; May 13, 1993 (age 33); Huntsville, Alabama, U.S.
- Occupations: Actress; singer-songwriter
- Years active: 2006–present
- Spouse: Josh Dun (m. 2019)
- Children: 1
- Musical career
- Genres: Indie rock, folk
- Instruments: Vocals
- Member of: The Never Ending

Deborah Ann Ryan (born May 13, 1993) is an American actress and singer-songwriter. She started acting professionally onstage at the age of seven, and was later discovered during Disney Channel's nationwide search for new talent. As a Disney child star, she had major roles in the series The Suite Life on Deck (2008–2011), the film 16 Wishes (2010), the series Jessie (2011–2015), and the film Radio Rebel (2012). She expanded into other appearances, such as the drama film What If... (2010), and has continued acting as an adult, including roles in the series Insatiable (2018–2019), the comedy film The Opening Act (2020), the thriller film Night Teeth (2021), and Spin Me Round (2022).

Ryan gained prominence in music by contributing vocals to the soundtracks of her Disney projects. She formed the indie rock band The Never Ending in 2013, with whom she released the EP One (2014).

== Early life ==
Deborah Ann Ryan was born in Huntsville, Alabama, on May 13, 1993, to Sandy (née Popp) and Chris Ryan. She has an older brother named Chase (b. 1991) who is a musician. Her mother is a teacher who was active in school plays. Her father's job as a civilian consultant to the U.S. military required the family to move to numerous places around Europe, and they lived in Germany until she was 10. She started performing in professional theaters at the age of seven on an American base in Germany.

Ryan attended a German public school and an American public school and was also homeschooled. They then returned to the U.S. and settled in Texas. She lived on Fort Hood. In a 2009 People Magazine interview, she described herself as a "nerd" in school. She was bullied in middle school for being a mascot and a member of the school's chess club.

== Career ==
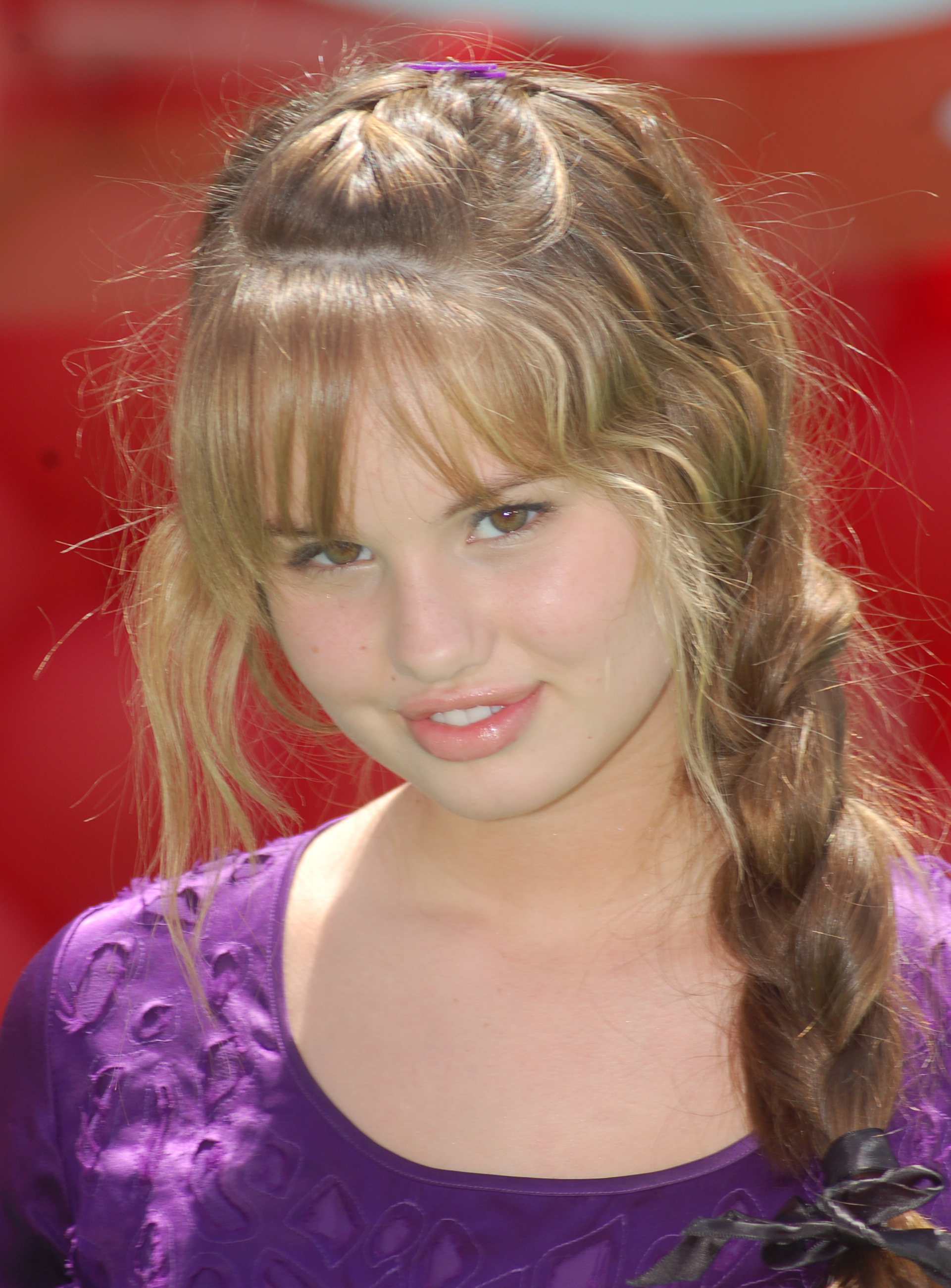
Ryan in May 2009

Ryan began appearing in television commercials in her early teen years. In 2006 she made her television debut on the show Barney & Friends. Her first film role was in 2007 as a guest character in Barney: Let's Go to the Firehouse. She appeared in several commercials for iDog and various board games; she was in an iDog Dance commercial in 2008. She also had a major role in the Metro-Goldwyn-Mayer feature film The Longshots as Edith. She played one of the main characters, Bailey Pickett, on the Disney Channel Original Series, The Suite Life on Deck, a sequel to the hit Disney Channel series The Suite Life of Zack & Cody. The series's pilot aired on September 26, 2008 in the United States, and was the most-watched series premiere in Canada on the Family channel. It was 2008's #1 scripted television series for teens, beating the veteran series Hannah Montana and Wizards of Waverly Place in the ratings. It was also 2009's top-rated scripted series, outpacing other teenage shows.

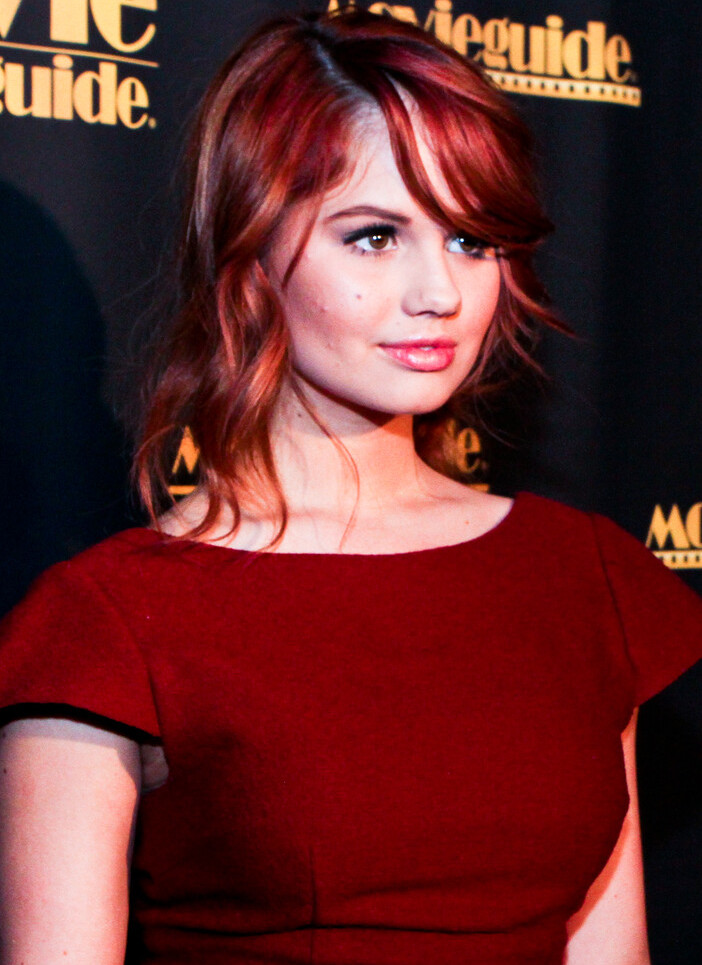
Ryan in February 2013

In 2009, Ryan landed a starring role in the independent feature film What If..., alongside Kevin Sorbo and Kristy Swanson. Shot in Grand Rapids and Manistee, Michigan in July 2009, it was released in theaters on August 20, 2010. It was produced by Pure Flix Entertainment and centers on a Christian family. In October 2009, Ryan hosted the first Tween Girl Summit Music Festival. "Tween girls are drawn to talented performers who emanate the joy of life, and we are so happy to have teen favorite Debby Ryan as the first host of The Tween Summit Music Festival," said Denise Restauri, founder of The Tween Summit, AllyKatzz.com and AK Tweens. Ryan was set to headline the "Terrific Teen Tour", a concert series which co-headlined Mitchel Musso, Jasmine Richards and Savannah Outen to start on July 9, 2009 and end on July 14, but it was canceled due to schedule conflicts. The tour would have been Ryan's debut as a live musician. In 2010, she starred in the young adult film 16 Wishes, which introduced her to more mature audiences. She watched numerous Brat Pack movies to prepare for the role.

On March 25, 2011, Ryan starred in The Suite Life Movie, based on the show she had starred in. On March 29, she released the promotional single "Made of Matches", which served as the theme of the Discovery Family show R.L. Stine's The Haunting Hour, in which she starred in one episode. The Suite Life on Deck finished its run on May 6, 2011. On July 6, she released her debut solo single, the alternative hip hop song We Ended Right, featuring Chad Hively & Chase Ryan. The song was released from her own label, the Ryan River Studio, founded with her brother, Chase Ryan. Also in 2011, it was announced that Ryan landed her own Disney Channel series called Jessie, which debuted in September 2011. The show follows a girl who moves from Texas to New York City to become a star but becomes a nanny instead for a family with four children. Jessie is a show she also helped create, relating that she wanted her character to relate to herself. Ryan directed the season three episode "Coffee Talk", making her the youngest female director for a Disney Channel production. Additionally, in a shift towards a more mature role, she guest starred in an episode of the show Private Practice as a recovering drug addict.

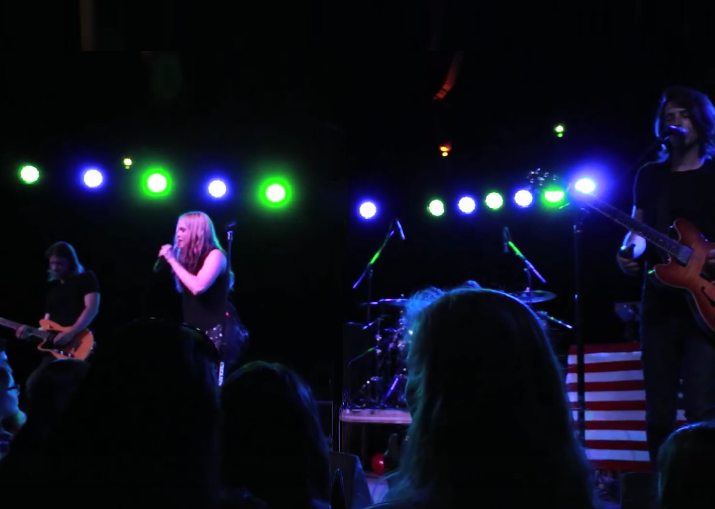
Ryan performing with The Never Ending in August 2014

On February 17, 2012, Ryan starred in another Disney Channel movie entitled Radio Rebel as Tara, a very shy teenage girl who dreads speaking to anyone in her school, but in the privacy of her bedroom, she incorporates the most famous radio persona of the internet under the nickname 'Radio Rebel'. She released a cover version of "We Got the Beat", by The Go-Go's, as the promotional single for the film on February 21. On August 31, 2012, she voiced the character Spike in the Tinker Bell film Secret of the Wings. Also in 2012, she formed the indie band The Never Ending with guitarist Kyle Moore and drummer Johnny Franco. She plays several instruments, including the guitar, piano, and keyboard.

In July 2012, Ryan started work on a clothing line for 2013. She said she was in the beginning stages of building herself a fashion brand and revealed that she has been looking into designers and interviewing brands she might like to work with. In 2013, Ryan starred in the film Kristin's Christmas Past as Haddie. She recorded an appearance in the film Muppets Most Wanted, released on March 21, 2014, but the scene was deleted. The scene was later reinstated in the Blu-ray release's extended version. On June 1, The Never Ending released their debut single, "Mulholland Drive", with a premiere on the Billboard website. Their debut EP One was released on June 24, featuring album art with a circus-theme. She also appeared in the show TV series Mighty Med as Jade and was guest mentor in the fifth season of Fashion Police. On April 17, 2015, an episode of Girl Meets World premiered featuring Ryan as Aubrey Macavoy. On June 23, 2015, The Never Ending debuted their new single, titled "Secondhand". Later that year, the band toured as an opening act for the North American leg of Fifth Harmony's Reflection Tour.

In 2016, Ryan was cast in the NBC police series The Mysteries of Laura in season two as Lucy Diamond, Laura's drugged and trouble-making younger paternal half-sister and the half-aunt of Nicholas and Harrison. At the same time, Ryan was confirmed in the cast of comedy series Sing It!. The show debuted on May 25, 2016, at YouTube Red, a paid service of streaming original series and movies, similar to Netflix. Ryan played Holli Holiday, a famous and egocentric singer, who uses the fictional talent show Sing It! to self-promote. The character was inspired by Paula Abdul. On August 22, Ryan was confirmed to join the VH1 drama series Daytime Divas, based on the book Satan's Sisters by former The View host Star Jones. The series debuted on June 5, 2017. She will play Maddie Finn, an ex-host of The Lunch Hour and rival of Kibby, who wants to return to the show.

In June 2017, Ryan announced via her Instagram account that Netflix had ordered Insatiable to series, after previously being passed on by The CW. The first season premiered on August 10, 2018. On February 14, 2020, the series was canceled after two seasons.

In 2020, Ryan co-starred with Alison Brie in the psychological drama film Horse Girl. She called the film a turning point in her career, reasoning that "I think that there is no going back after this; … That being said, I admire being in different processes, in different genres, with different storytellers, and it's incredible on-the-job training — it's like going back and majoring in something that you never even took as an elective in high school." In the same year, Ryan was cast in Netflix's thriller Night Teeth, directed by Adam Randall. She also appeared in The Opening Act directed by Steve Byrne.

Ryan would join Alison Brie in another movie called Spin Me Round in 2022, and then appear in four episodes of the Peacock Original series The Resort the same year. In 2023, Ryan appeared in Shortcomings, an Asian-American relationship drama directed by Randall Park.

== Influences ==
In a March 2009 interview, she revealed that she also looked up to Meryl Streep, calling Streep "so profoundly thought-provoking and life-changing". In a May 2009 People interview, Ryan stated that her Suite Life co-star, Brenda Song, was her acting idol. She has said that her other role models include Anne Hathaway, Rachel McAdams and Tobey Maguire.

Ryan has said that her musical style includes folk, indie pop, and country. She cited The Lumineers, Mumford & Sons, April Smith and the Great Picture Show and Tom Petty as influences for her band's debut EP.

== Personal life ==
Ryan is a Christian. She is fluent in German.

She dated Twenty One Pilots drummer Josh Dun from May 2013 to September 2014, and they resumed their relationship at an unknown date. They were married in Austin, Texas, on December 31, 2019.

In March 2015, Ryan revealed that she had once been in an abusive relationship, though she described it as a professional relationship rather than a romantic one. She explained that "it was such emotional manipulation to the point where it became physical", and the experience inspired her to team up with Mary Kay and LoveisRespect for their "Don't Look Away" anti-domestic violence campaign.

In April 2016, Ryan was arrested for driving under the influence. She was initially charged with felony DUI, which was later reduced to two misdemeanors, and was released after posting $100,000 bail. On June 30, she pleaded no contest to reckless driving and was sentenced to three years of probation, community service, and attending a DUI program.

As of March 2023, Ryan and her husband live in Columbus, Ohio. On September 7, 2025, the couple announced via Instagram that they were expecting their first child. They announced the birth of their daughter on December 13, 2025.

Ryan explained in 2026 that she has suffered from five concussions, with the fifth concussion being onset by bobsledding, which led to a severe brain injury, with memory and personality issues, and severe migraines appearing, but noted that she has a strong support system in her husband, family members and friends.

== Filmography ==
=== Film ===
Year	Title	Role	Notes
2007	Barney: Let's Go to the Firehouse	Teenage Girl	
2008	The Longshots	Edith Smith	
2010	What If...	Kimberly "Kim" Walker	
2011	The Hangover Hollywood	Herself	Short film
2012	Secret of the Wings	Spike	Voice role
2014	Muppets Most Wanted	Wedding Guest	Extended version scene
2017	Rip Tide	Cora	
2018	Cover Versions	Maple	
2018	Grace	Nicole	
2018	Every Day	Jolene	
2018	Life of the Party	Jennifer	
2020	Horse Girl	Nikki	
2020	The Opening Act	Jen	
2021	Night Teeth	Blaire	
2022	Spin Me Round	Susie	
2023	Shortcomings	Sasha	
2023	Fast X	Herself	Cameo
2023	Howdy, Neighbor!	Harley Walker	
2024	Turtles All The Way Down	Quinn	Cameo
2025	Orion		
2026	The Sun Never Sets	Lindsey	
TBA	Famous		Post-production

=== Television ===
Year	Title	Role	Notes
2006	Barney & Friends	Debby	Recurring role (Season 10)
2008	Jonas Brothers: Living the Dream	Herself	Episode: "Hello Hollywood"
2008–2011	The Suite Life on Deck	Bailey Pickett	Main role
2008–2011	The Suite Life on Deck	Princess Zaria	Episode: "Can You Dig It?"
2009	Wizards of Waverly Place	Bailey Pickett	Episode: "Cast Away (To Another Show)"
2009	Hannah Montana	Bailey Pickett	Episode: "Super(stitious) Girl"
2010	16 Wishes	Abigail "Abby" Jensen	Television film
2011	The Suite Life Movie	Bailey Pickett	Television film
2011	R. L. Stine's The Haunting Hour: The Series	Steffani Howard	Episode: "Wrong Number"
2011	PrankStars	Herself	Episode: "Something to Chew On"
2011	Disney's Friends for Change Games	Herself / Contestant	5 episodes, part of Blue Team
2011	Private Practice	Hayley	Episode: "The Breaking Point"
2011–2015	Jessie	Jessie Prescott	Lead role directed 4 episodes and producer (season 4)
2012	So Random!	Herself	Episode: "Cole & Dylan Sprouse"
2012	Zeke and Luther	Courtney Mills	Episode: "There's No Business Like Bro Business"
2012	The Glades	Christa Johnson	Episode: "Fountain of Youth"
2012	Radio Rebel	Tara Adams	Television film
2012	Austin & Ally	Jessie Prescott	Episode: "Austin & Jessie & Ally All Star New Year"
2013	The Coppertop Flop Show	Herself	2 episodes
2013	Good Luck Charlie	Jessie Prescott	Episode: "Good Luck Jessie: NYC Christmas"
2013	Kristin's Christmas Past	Haddie	Television film
2014	Mighty Med	Jade / Remix	Episode: "Guitar Superhero"
2014	Ultimate Spider-Man	Jessie Prescott	Voice; episode: "Halloween Night at the Museum"
2014	Fashion Police	Guest mentor	Episode: "Debby Ryan and Jamie Chung"
2015	Girl Meets World	Aubrey	Episode: "Girl Meets Demolition"
2015	Goldie & Bear	Thumbelina	Voice; episode: "Thumbelina's Wild Ride"
2016	The Mysteries of Laura	Lucy Diamond	Episodes: "Unknown Caller" and "End of Watch"
2016	Sing It!	Holli Holiday	Main role
2017	Daytime Divas	Maddie Finn	Episodes: "Lunch Is on Us" and "Shut It Down"
2017	The Talk	Guest host	Episode: "May 17"
2018–2019	Insatiable	Patricia "Patty" Bladell	Lead role
2022	The Resort	Hanna	Recurring role
2023–2024	Velma	Krista	Voice; recurring role
2024	American Horror Stories	Jillian Fletcher	Episode: "The Thing Under the Bed"
2026	Kevin	Actress (voice)	Episode: "Animal of the Month"

== Discography ==
=== Singles ===
List of singles, with selected chart positions
Title	Year	Album
"We Ended Right" (featuring Chad Hively and Chase Ryan)	2011	Non-album single

=== Other appearances ===
Song	Year	Album
"Hakuna Matata"	2010	Disneymania 7
"A Wish Comes True Everyday"	2010	16 Wishes
"Open Eyes"	2010	16 Wishes
"Made of Matches"	2011	The Haunting Hour: The Series
"Hey, Jessie"	2012	Make Your Mark: Ultimate Playlist
"We Got the Beat"	2012	Radio Rebel
"Deck the Halls"	2012	Disney Channel Holiday Playlist
"Favorite Time of Year"	2013	Disney Holidays Unwrapped
"Face 2 Face" (with Ross Lynch)	2013	Austin & Ally: Turn It Up
"Best Year"	2014	Disney Channel Play It Loud

=== Music videos ===
Song	Year	Director
As lead artist
"A Wish Comes True Every Day"	2010	Peter DeLuise
"Deck the Halls"	2010	—N/a
"We Got the Beat"	2012	Peter Howitt
As guest appearance
"Ever Enough" (by A Rocket to the Moon)	2013	Mark Staubach
"Level of Concern" (by Twenty One Pilots)	2020	Reel Bear Media

=== Production and songwriting credits ===
Production and songwriting
Title	Year	Artist(s)	Album	Notes
"Feel My Heart"	2009	Chase Ryan	Feel My Heart	Co-producer
"Saying Goodbye"	2009	Chase Ryan	Feel My Heart	Co-producer
"Still Need You"	2009	Chase Ryan	Feel My Heart	Co-producer
"Forecast"	2009	Chase Ryan	Feel My Heart	Co-producer
"Dream This Town"	2009	Chase Ryan	Feel My Heart	Co-producer
"Open Eyes"	2010	Debby Ryan	16 Wishes	Songwriter
"Made Of Matches"	2010	Debby Ryan	—N/a	Songwriter, Producer
"Innocent Love"	2010	Chase Ryan	Innocent Love	Co-producer
"We Ended Right"	2011	Debby Ryan, Chase Ryan and Cad Hively	Radio Rebel	Songwriter, Co-producer
"Mulholland Drive	2014	The Never Ending	One	Co-producer
"Ruthless"	2014	The Never Ending	One	Co-producer
"Before I Go Upstairs"	2014	The Never Ending	One	Co-producer
"Call Me Up"	2014	The Never Ending	One	Co-producer
"When the Dark Falls"	2014	The Never Ending	One	Co-producer
"Best Year"	2014	Debby Ryan	Disney Channel: Play It Loud	Co-producer

== Awards and nominations ==
Year	Association	Category	Work	Result	Ref.
2008	Celebrity Love Awards	Favorite Actress	The Suite Life on Deck	Nominated	
2009	Celebrity Love Awards	Favorite Actress	The Suite Life on Deck	Nominated	
2009	Poptastic Awards	Favorite Television Actress	The Suite Life on Deck	Nominated	
2009	Poptastic Awards	Female Newcomer	The Suite Life on Deck	Won	
2010	Celebrity Love Awards	Favorite Actress	The Suite Life on Deck	Nominated	
2010	Hollywood Teen TV Awards	Teen Pick Actress: Comedy	The Suite Life on Deck	Nominated	
2010	Body Peace Award	Outstanding Advocate	The Suite Life on Deck	Won	
2010	Nickelodeon UK Kids' Choice Awards	Best Television Actress	The Suite Life on Deck	Won	
2011	Young Artist Award	Best Performance in a TV Movie, Miniseries or Special Leading or Supporting Young Actress	16 Wishes	Nominated	
2012	Popstar Awards	TV Actress	Jessie	Won	
2012	Popstar Awards	Female Style Idol	Herself	Nominated	
2012	Teen Icon Awards	"Iconic Heart"	Herself	Nominated	
2014	Kids' Choice Awards	Favorite TV Actress	Jessie	Nominated	
2014	Teen Choice Awards	Choice TV Actress: Comedy	Jessie	Nominated	
2015	Kids' Choice Awards	Favorite TV Actress	Jessie	Nominated	
