= Felipe Esparza =

Mexican-American stand-up comedian (b. 1968)

Felipe de Jesus Esparza
- Born: June 11, 1976 (age 50); Sinaloa, Mexico
- Spouse: Lesa O'Daniel Esparza (m. 2012)
- Children: 4

Comedy career
- Years active: 1994–present
- Medium: Stand-up comedy. acting, podcasting
- Website: felipesworld.com

Felipe de Jesus Esparza (born June 11, 1976) is a Mexican-born American stand-up comedian and actor. He began performing stand-up in 1994. He won Last Comic Standing in 2010. Felipe is currently on tour for his comedy show, "At My Leisure". In addition, Felipe hosts a weekly popular YouTube podcast named "What's up Fool?"

== Early life and education ==
Felipe Esparza was born in Sinaloa, Mexico. He lived with his mother's family in Sinaloa before moving with his family to live with his aunt in Tijuana, where they lived for about two years. His father had left the family to go to the United States alone. Eventually, before President Reagan's amnesty law, Esparza, his two brothers, and his mother illegally immigrated to the United States. Eventually they made their way to the Boyle Heights neighborhood of Los Angeles, where his father was living and they were able to follow the path to citizenship. Esparza was raised in the Aliso Village housing projects of Boyle Heights. He attended Theodore Roosevelt High School.

== Career ==
Esparza began performing stand-up in 1994 after a stint in drug rehab. He won Last Comic Standing in 2010. And grew in popularity ever since, fueled by 4 standup specials for HBO and Netflix and multiple sold out tours of comedy clubs and theaters.

Felipe is currently on his "Laughter Will Save Us" tour as of 2026

He also has several popular podcasts, including "What's up fool? Podcast", a laid back "hang" podcast that has showcased multiple comedians, actors, authors, musicians and artists since 2014. He also co-hosts "History for Foos Podcast" with fellow comedian Butch Escobar and "Do you Even Binge? Podcast", a movie/TV binge podcast with his wife, Lesa.

Various TV shows and film appearances, including Superstore (NBC/Hulu), The Eric Andre Show (Adult Swim), You People (Netflix with Jonah Hill and Eddie Murphy), Blue Beetle (Xolo Maridueño, George Lopez), This Fool (Hulu), 7th and Union (with Omar Chapparro), and more.

== Personal life ==
Felipe Esparza has been married to Lesa O'Daniel Esparza since 2014. He became vegan in 2011.

He has three children and one step child.

== Filmography and discography ==
=== Stand-up comedy releases ===
Solo albums and TV specials
Title	Release date	Debut medium
They're Not Gonna Laugh at You	January 1, 2012	Television (Showtime)
Rebound Material	December 11, 2013	Audio streaming
Translate This	September 30, 2017	Television (HBO)
Bad Decisions	September 1, 2020	Streaming TV (Netflix)
Malas Decisiones	September 1, 2020	Streaming TV (Netflix)
Raging Fool	February 11, 2025	Streaming TV (Netflix)

=== Films ===
Year	Title	Role
2003	El matador	Pablo
2009	The Deported	Fernando
2010	I'm Not Like That No More	Felipe Valenzuela
2015	The Fix	Pablo
2016	She's Allergic to Cats	Tow Truck Driver
2018	Taco Shop	Mugres
2020	The Opening Act	Cabbie Steve
2023	Blue Beetle	Security Tech #3

=== Television ===
Year	Title	Role	Notes
2014–2015, 2020–2023	The Eric Andre Show	Himself	6 episodes
2015	The Shop	Felipe	7 episodes
2016	Campus Law	Alan	2 episodes
2016–2018	Superstore	Cody	5 episodes
2020	Gentefied	Crazy Dave	Recurring role
2023	Royal Crackers	Mexican Officer (voice)	Episode: "Casa de Darby"
2025	Primos	Churro (voice)	Episode: "Summer of Silencio"
2025	Shifting Gears	Bob	Episode: "Grief"
