= One (The Never Ending EP) =

EP by The Never Ending
- Released: June 24, 2014
- Recorded: 2014
- Genre: Indie folk
- Label: Ryan River Studio

Singles from One
- 1. "Mulholland Drive" Released: June 4, 2014

One is the debut extended play by American band The Never Ending. It was released on June 24, 2014.

== Background ==
In an interview with Billboard, The Never Ending announced that their debut EP One will be released on June 24, 2014. In March 2014, they released the EP's artwork, which depicts a circus theme. In April, 24, Ryan posted a video teaser with one of the new songs, "Call Me Up (Style)", a song about the standard of beauty. On April 21, Ryan announced on her website one of the songs, "When the Dark Falls", and released the lyrics. On May 7, was released a video teaser of the promotional song "When the Dark Falls". On June 1, Ryan announced the debut single, "Mulholland Drive". On June 3 the song was released with a premiere in the Billboard website.

== Critical reception ==
Browder, from Candor News gave One 5 stars out of 5 stating; "A perfect mix of sleepy, folksy tunes and upbeat driving pop rock, The Never Ending is a strong debut." Telling readers to check out tracks 3 "Before I Go Upstairs" and 4 "Call Me Up" she stated The Never Ending show strength through versatile sounds.

== Track listing ==
All of the song's lyrics are written by Debby Ryan. The tracks are collaborated with all of the band members and Chase Ryan.

No.	Title	Writer(s)	Length
1.	"Mulholland Drive"	Debby Ryan; Nicholas Santino	3:21
2.	"Ruthless"	Ryan	3:21
3.	"Before I Go Upstairs"	Ryan; Santino	2:59
4.	"Call Me Up"	Ryan	2:32
5.	"When the Dark Falls"	Ryan; Santino	2:46
Total length:			15:02
