= We Ended Right =

Single by Debby Ryan featuring Chad Hively and Chase Ryan
- Released: July 3, 2011
- Recorded: 2011
- Genre: Alternative hip hop
- Length: 4:05
- Label: Ryan River Studio
- Songwriters: Debby Ryan; Chad Hively; Chase Ryan; Mark Grilliot
- Producers: Chase Ryan; Debby Ryan; Mark Grilliot

Debby Ryan singles chronology
"We Ended Right" (2011)	"We Got the Beat (promo)" (2012)

Chase Ryan singles chronology
"Innocent Love" (2010)	"We Ended Right" (2011)

"We Ended Right" is the debut solo single by American singer-songwriter Debby Ryan, featuring rapper Chad Hively and Chase Ryan. It premiered on July 1, 2011 and was released as a digital download on July 3, 2011 as the first single of Debby Ryan's career on her own independent label, the Ryan River Studio and not being included on any album. "We Ended Right" was written and produced by Debby Ryan, Chad Hively, Chase Ryan and Mark Grilliot.

== Background and release ==
In an interview with AOL's JSYK, Ryan commented: "It is the perfect song for 4th of July weekend, and we hope everyone loves it!". On July 6, 2011 the singer revealed in her official Twitter that she took the photo and designed the artwork for the single cover. Ryan said that the concept of the single cover, the line train, it's about moving on and that life never stops at just one Train station.

"We Ended Right" was released exclusively for radio premiere on July 1, 2011 on AOL Radio and had good reception. The song was released for digital download on July 3, 2011 only in United States, Canada, Australia and United Kingdom by Ryan River Studio, the Ryan's own independent label. Only on February 21, 2012 the song placed on YouTube, in her official VEVO channel. Later the song was included on the soundtrack of the movie Radio Rebel.

== Composition ==
A midtempo hip hop ballad song, "We Ended Right" exhibits elements of alternative hip hop, pop rap and R&B. Built on a beat, multi-tracked harmonies, the song's instrumentation includes slow-bouncing keyboard tones, and drums. The song was written by Ryan and American songwriters Chad Hively, Chase Ryan and Mark Grilliot. It produced by Chase Ryan and Debby Ryan. Lyrically, the song gives ode to disaster love, sadness, end of a relationship and overcome. In an interview with AOL's JSYK, Debby Ryan commented about mixing styles: "I like the story this song tells, the blend of different vibes and genres, and it has a radio friendly balance". About her inspiration for the song, Ryan said: "It is the perfect song for 4th of July (Independence Day in United States) weekend". Ryan said she didn't want to be a singer and the song was created unexpectedly, when she became involved in the composition.

"None of us planned on me singing on the song. The guys were in the studio writing the song but needed some fresh perspective on the chorus. I love to write and I will occasionally help out in the studio if I’m around. While I was helping with the rewrite, we all noticed how naturally our voices blended together on this song. By the time we were done, we all realized that I had to sing on it with them. It is a fun, laid-back summertime jam."

== Reception ==
=== Critical reception ===
The song has received positive reviews from music critics. Disney Dreaming was positive and said they were falling in love for the song and commented: "We really like the song and can’t wait for Debby to release an album with more music like this on it!". They also said that "The song has been getting a lot of attention since it released". Matt Collar of AllMusic wasn't a review, but honored the song with three stars (3/5)'. Lily Tran to Lovely Ish said they're impressed and loved the song. She noted that many people hate Disney Channel artists, but this time "have a different reaction" and commented: "I might be biased, but I love the song. It's very different from the cookie cutter pop songs that Disney Channel stars usually come out".

The Fanlala was positive and said "We love the new song!" and "We think it's a hit!". The Sillykhan said the song is great and everyone will love. They commented "Remember you can download the song from itunes. It's good. Put it on your ipod. It’s a good song and you will love it". Contessa Gayles to AOL called Ryan "more mature" than the other Walt Disney artists. Nadine Cheung to Cambio was positive and said "Although the Disney star didn't have plans to record the song, she worked so well with the songwriting duo that it was a natural fit".

Cristin Maher to Pop Crush was extremely negative. About her voice, the critic said: "Ryan’s vocals are nowhere near spectacular, as she sings “woah, oh” in a register that she clearly can't reach. Her voice also gets very nasally on the digitally-treated chorus". Maher also said that the composition is confusing, because the song talks about "ended right", but the performers seem sad and regretful. The critic concludes commenting: "The beat also falls short, with a generic melody that reminds us of a cheesy lovesick late ’90s song with some synth thrown in there for good measure. Overall, we aren’t really digging this tune. Maybe next time, Deb!".

=== Chart performance ===
For the week ending July 17, 2011, "We Ended Right" debuted at number 147 on the South Korean International Singles Chart, making it the first song to chart in the country.

== Track listing ==
- Digital download single
1. "We Ended Right" (feat. Chad Hively & Chase Ryan) – 4:05

== Chart ==
Chart (2011)	Peak position
South Korea (Gaon International Chart)	147

== Release history ==
Country	Date	Format	Label
United States	July 3, 2011	Digital download	Ryan River Studio
Australia	July 3, 2011	Digital download	Ryan River Studio
Canada	July 3, 2011	Digital download	Ryan River Studio
United Kingdom	July 3, 2011	Digital download	Ryan River Studio
