= No Clue =

- Directed by: Carl Bessai
- Written by: Brent Butt
- Produced by: James Brown; Brent Butt; Kirk D'Amico; Laura Lightbown; Mark Slone; Carl Bessai
- Starring: Brent Butt; Amy Smart; David Koechner
- Edited by: Mark Shearer
- Music by: Schaun Tozer
- Production company: Sparrow Media
- Distributed by: Entertainment One
- Release dates: 5 December 2013 (Whistler); 7 March 2014 (Canada)
- Running time: 96 minutes
- Country: Canada
- Language: English
- Box office: $64,055

No Clue is a 2013 Canadian dark comedy film written by Brent Butt and directed by Carl Bessai, starring Butt, Amy Smart and David Koechner.

== Plot ==
Advertising salesman Leo (Butt) unwittingly assumes the role of a private investigator to help Kyra (Smart), but becomes embroiled in a risky and ever-deepening murder mystery.

In Canada, a woman named Kyra goes to the office of the middle-aged clumsy salesman Leo Falloon by mistake believing that he is a private detective. She hires him to help her to find her missing brother Milles Severeign and Leo is so spellbound by the blonde that he does not tell her that he is not who she is looking for. Leo decides to pose as a private detective and he gets involved in a complicated scheme of fraud by computer game corporations.

== Cast ==
- Brent Butt as Leo
- Amy Smart as Kyra
- David Koechner as Ernie
- David Cubitt as Horn
- Dan Payne as Church
- Dustin Milligan as Danny
- Kirsten Prout as Reese
- Garwin Sanford as Nelson
- Nancy Robertson as Phyllis
- Chelah Horsdal as Alice

== Production ==
No Clue was filmed in Vancouver in July 2012.

== Release ==
The first screening of No Clue was on 5 December 2013 at the Whistler Film Festival in British Columbia. Public screenings began in Vancouver on 6 March 2014, with the general Canadian release the following day.

== Reception ==
The movie received mixed reviews from critics. It holds a 33% score on Rotten Tomatoes based on 6 reviews. Critics praised the acting of Brent Butt, Amy Smart, and David Koechner.
