= The Opening Act =

2020 American comedy film

- Theatrical release poster
- Directed by: Steve Byrne
- Written by: Steve Byrne
- Produced by: Vince Vaughn; Peter Billingsley; Sefton Fincham
- Starring: Jimmy O. Yang; Alex Moffat; Cedric the Entertainer; Neal Brennan; Bill Burr; Whitney Cummings; Jermaine Fowler; Ken Jeong; Russell Peters; Debby Ryan
- Cinematography: Eric Edwards
- Edited by: Sandra Torres Granovsky
- Music by: Dave Kushner; Jose Cancela
- Production companies: Wild West Picture Show Productions; Look to the Sky Films; Endeavor Content
- Distributed by: RLJE Films
- Release date: October 16, 2020
- Country: United States
- Language: English

The Opening Act is a 2020 American comedy film written and directed by Steve Byrne, in his directorial debut. It stars Jimmy O. Yang, Alex Moffat, Cedric the Entertainer, Neal Brennan, Bill Burr, Whitney Cummings, Jermaine Fowler, Ken Jeong, Russell Peters, and Debby Ryan.

It was released on October 16, 2020, by RLJE Films.

== Premise ==
The film follows Will Chu whose true life passion is to become a stand-up comedian. When he is given the opportunity to emcee a comedy show, opening for his hero, Billy G. he must decide if he wants to continue the life he has set up or pursue his dream, the life of a comedian.

== Cast ==
- Jimmy O. Yang as Will Chu
- Cedric the Entertainer as Billy G
- Whitney Cummings as Brooke
- Ken Jeong as Quinn
- Debby Ryan as Jen
- Alex Moffat as Chris Palmer
- Iliza Shlesinger as Val
- Neal Brennan as Chip
- Mircea Monroe as Carrie
- Russell Peters as Randy
- Bill Burr as Barry
- Anjelah Johnson as Chrissy
- Tom Segura as Cop
- Roy Wood Jr. as Gary
- Felipe Esparza as Cabbie Steve
- Jermaine Fowler as Ricky
- Jackie Tohn as Megan

== Production ==
In June 2018, it was announced Jimmy O. Yang, Neal Brennan, Russell Peters, Debby Ryan, Bill Burr, Anjelah Johnson, Tom Segura and Roy Wood Jr. had joined the cast of the film, with Steve Byrne, directing from a screenplay he wrote. Vince Vaughn and Peter Billingsley will serve as producers under their Wild West Picture Show Productions banner. In July 2018, Cedric the Entertainer, Whitney Cummings, Ken Jeong, Jermaine Fowler, Iliza Shlesinger, Alex Moffat, and Felipe Esparza joined the cast of the film.

=== Filming ===
In June 2018, it was reported that principal photography for the film had already begun in Los Angeles. The Radio Station scene was filmed on the Cal State Fullerton campus.

== Release ==
In September 2020, RLJE Films acquired distribution rights to the film and set it for an October 16, 2020, release.

== Reception ==
On review aggregator Rotten Tomatoes, the film holds an approval rating of 82% based on 22 reviews, with an average rating of 7/10. The website's critics consensus reads: "With The Opening Act, writer-director Steve Byrne offers perceptive insights on the struggles faced by budding stand-up comedians -- and creative dreamers in general."
