= Sarena Parmar =

Canadian actress

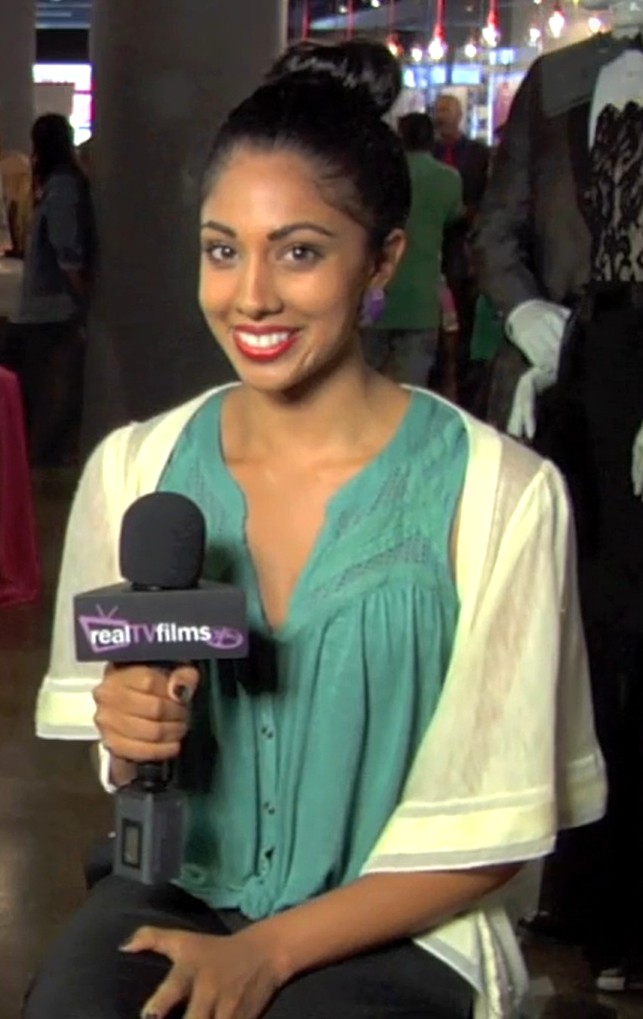
- Parmar in 2013
- Born: Prince George, British Columbia, Canada
- Occupation: Actress
- Years active: 2009–present

Sarena Parmar is a Canadian actress.

== Early life ==
Parmar was born in Prince George and raised in Kelowna, British Columbia, Parmar later went on to graduate from The National Theatre School of Canada. Her family is originally from Punjab, India.

== Career ==
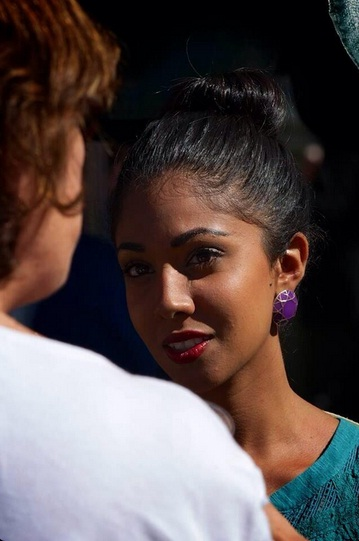
Parmar in 2013

Parmar is best known for her role as Chandra Mehta on the television show How to Be Indie. She has also starred in Disney Channel Original Movie Radio Rebel, as Audrey Sharma.

In 2013, she starred in The Animal Project, which premiered at the 2013 Toronto International Film Festival.

In the Summer of 2018, she starred in "The Orchard (After Chekhov)", a play she also wrote, at the Shaw Festival in Niagara-on-the-Lake, Ontario, Canada.

== Filmography ==
Year	Title	Role	Notes
2009	Word on the Street	Various	TV film
2009	Flashpoint	Jasmine Amiri	Episode: "Just a Man"
2009	The Border	Mina Diwan	Episode: "Bride Price"
2009–2011	How to Be Indie	Chandra Mehta	Main role (33 episodes)
2010	Degrassi: The Next Generation	Farrah Hassan	Episodes: "Why Can't This Be Love?: Parts 1 & 2"
2012	Radio Rebel	Audrey Sharma	TV film
2013	The Animal Project	Mira	Feature film
2015	Suits	Fiancé	Episode: "Privilege"
2021–2023	Pretty Hard Cases	Detective Breann Chattopadhyay	Recurring
2022	Far Cry 6	Ishwari Ghale	Pagan Min: Control DLC; Video game
2024	Code 8: Part II	Stephanie Kingston	Feature film
