= The Never Ending =

2010s American indie rock band

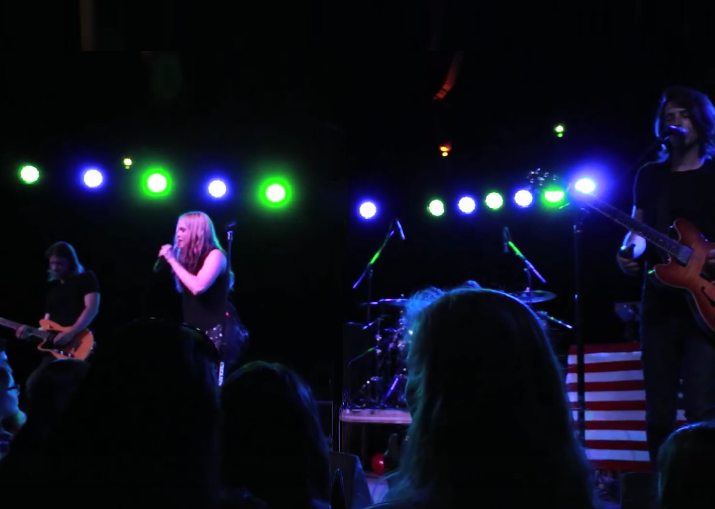
- The Never Ending performing in 2014. From left to right: Carman Kubanda, Debby Ryan, Johnny Franco and Kyle Moore

Background information
- Origin: Los Angeles, California, United States
- Genres: Indie folk
- Years active: 2013–2016
- Labels: Ryan River Studio
- Past members: Debby Ryan; Kyle Moore; Johnny Franco; Edwin Carranza; Carman Kubanda; Harry Allen
- Website: Official website

The Never Ending (stylized as THΞ ΠΞvΞR ΞΠDIΠG) was an American indie folk band from Los Angeles, California, formed in 2013. The Never Ending debuted as a six-member band with Debby Ryan, Kyle Moore, Johnny Franco, Edwin Carranza, Carman Kubanda and Harry Alen. After the release of the EP 'One', Edwin Carranza, Carman Kubanda and Harry Alen left the band to pursue other personal projects. In 2015, the band became a trio consisting of vocalist Debby Ryan, guitarist Kyle Moore and drummer Johnny Franco.

== Career ==
The Never Ending was formed in 2013 and in December they released a cover video of "Santa Baby". Ryan began writing and developing songs for the band's debut album in January 2014, and the band was officially announced on February 4 with a video teaser on YouTube. It contained the message: "I want you to meet the people I tell stories with. To me, telling these stories with these people is the most important part of the process. We get to do something that will live on after us. we get to do something never ending".

Ryan announced and released the lyrics for the band's first song, "When the Dark Falls", on her website on 21 April 2014. A video teaser for the band's second song, "Call Me Up", followed several days later. On May 7, the video teaser for the aforementioned "When The Darkness Falls" was released. Ryan announced the debut single, "Mulholland Drive", on June 1, 2014. On June 3 the song was released with a premiere in the Billboard website. The Never Ending's debut EP One was released on June 24, 2014, featuring album art from a circus-themed photoshoot they'd done in March 2014.

In an interview with Robert Herrera to Front Row Live Entertainment, Ryan said she was writing new songs and the band would record the album to 2015. Ryan confirmed the songs "Dollar Store Locket", "Follow", "Secondhand" and "It's Not Personal". On April 24, 2015, it was announced that Ryan and her band The Never Ending will accompany Natalie La Rose and Bea Miller as opening act's for the summer leg of Fifth Harmony's The Reflection Tour, which is set to begin on July 15 in Louisville, KY. On September 23, 2016, the band released "Secondhand".

== Influences ==
In an interview to Christina Garibaldi of MTV, in 2013, Ryan commented that the band musical style includes folk, indie pop and country. She cited as biggest musical influences Grace Potter and the Nocturnals, The Lumineers, Mumford & Sons, April Smith and the Great Picture Show, Lady Antebellum and Tom Petty.

== Members ==
- Debby Ryan: (born May 13, 1993, in Huntsville, Alabama) was the band's singer and songwriter
- Kyle Moore: (born August 26, 1987, in Albuquerque, New Mexico) was the songwriter, guitarist and backing vocalist of the band. He is a former songwriter and guitarist of the group Ives the Band.
- Johnny Franco: (born in Los Angeles) was the drummer. He played on the album of various artists like Maná, Phillip Phillips, Manuel Romero, Kenny Lattimore and Cymphonique Miller.
- Edwin Carranza: (born January 7, 1990, in San Fernando, California) was the bassist. He studied music at California State University, Northridge. In 2010 performed on the Grammy Foundation events. Carranza left the band after the release of the EP One.
- Carman Kubanda: (born July 30, 1989, in Seattle, Washington) was the guitarist and backing vocalist. He was guitarist of the group He Is We. and currently plays guitar for the band Machineheart along with Harrison Allen. Kubanda left the band after the release of the EP One.
- Harrison "Harry" Webster Allen: (born April 3, 1991, in Seattle) was the keyboardist and songwriter. Allen used to play drums in the pop group He Is We and currently is the drummer for Machineheart alongside Carman Kubanda. Allen left the band after the release of the EP One.

== Discography ==
=== Extended plays ===
List of albums
Title	Album details
One	Released: June 24, 2014; Formats: Digital download; Label: Ryan River Studio

=== Singles ===
List of singles
Song	Year	Album
"Mulholland Drive"	2014	One
"Secondhand"	2016	non-album single

=== Promotional singles ===
List of promotional singles
Song	Year	Album
"Santa Baby"	2013	—

=== Music videos ===
Song	Year	Director	Notes
"Santa Baby"	2013	Debby Ryan	
"Secondhand"	2016	Debby Ryan	

== Concert tours ==
Headlining

- One Tour (2014)

Opening Act

- The Reflection Tour (Fifth Harmony) (2015)
