= Steve Byrne =

American stand-up comedian and actor

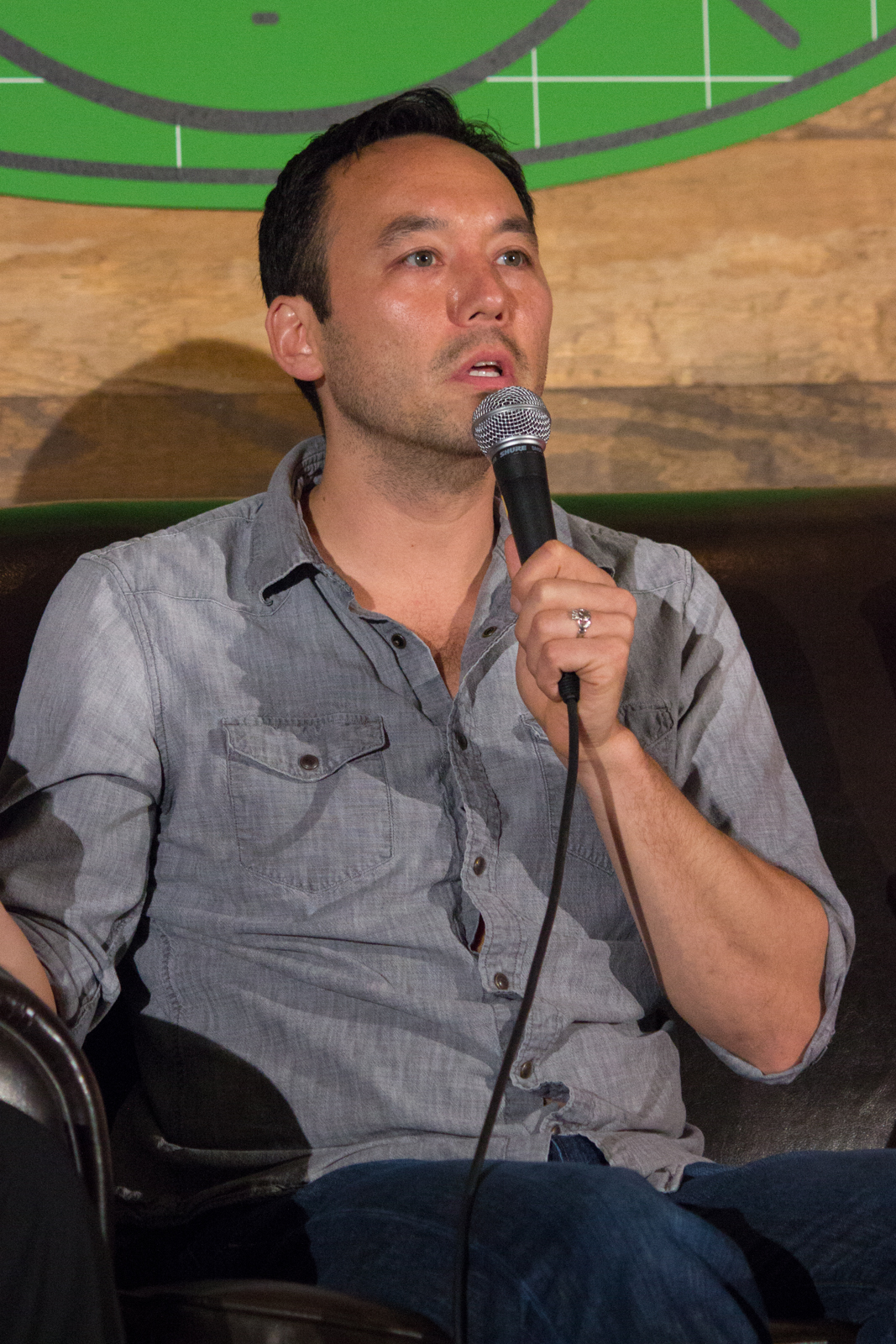
- Byrne at the ATX TV Festival 2014 for Sullivan & Son
- Born: July 21, 1974 (age 52); Freehold, New Jersey, U.S.
- Notable work: Sullivan & Son
- Children: 2

Comedy career
- Years active: 1997–present
- Medium: Stand-up
- Genres: Observational comedy, Character comedy, Black comedy
- Subjects: Korean-American culture, Irish-American culture, race relations, racism, self-deprecation, relationships, sex, pop culture, stereotypes

Steve Byrne (born July 21, 1974) is an American stand-up comedian and actor. He is best known from his multiple stand up comedy hour specials; creating, writing, and starring in Sullivan & Son; and as the writer/director of the feature film The Opening Act.

== Early life and education ==
Byrne was born in Freehold, New Jersey. Byrne grew up in Pittsburgh, Pennsylvania, and went to Hampton High School. He graduated from Kent State University in Kent, Ohio. His mother is Korean and his father is of Irish descent. Byrne has a younger brother, William.

== Career ==
Byrne was exposed to stand up comedy while working at the comedy club Caroline's in New York City. The first time he got on stage was at Stand Up New York on September 30, 1997.

In 2003, Byrne filmed the documentary film 13 or Bust, where he did 13 shows in one night at every comedy club in Manhattan, breaking the record for most sets in one night by a comedian. His Comedy Central Presents Half Hour Special premiered in 2006 and was voted the seventeenth-most-popular Comedy Central Presents by fans as part of the Standup Showdown on comedycentral.com. That same year, he did a show for Comedy Central and the troops at Ft. Irwin in 2006. Byrne has participated in USO tours of Afghanistan in June 2008, Japan and Guam in July 2009 and Afghanistan again in 2010.

He has had small parts in several films: The Goods: Live Hard, Sell Hard, starring Jeremy Piven and produced by Will Ferrell; Four Christmases, starring Vince Vaughn and Reese Witherspoon; and Couples Retreat, starring Vince Vaughn and Jon Favreau.

Byrne had a one-hour special on Comedy Central in 2008 titled Steve Byrne's Happy Hour. In 2010, he had another one-hour special on Comedy Central titled The Byrne Identity. He filmed his third hour special Feb. 8th in New York City in 2014, called Champion, for Netflix.

In early 2011, he toured on The Comedy Road Show with Vince Vaughn and Kevin James to promote the film The Dilemma. In the summer of 2011, he toured on The New Majority Tour with Lisa Lampanelli, Gabriel Iglesias and Russell Peters.

Byrne wrote and created with Rob Long the comedy Sullivan & Son on TBS that premiered in the summer of 2012. A second season that aired in summer of 2013. The show had an average of 2.4 million viewers per episode and was brought back for a third season with 13 episodes slated for summer of 2014. Byrne toured with the other comedians and co-stars of the show Owen Benjamin, Ahmed Ahmed and Roy Wood Jr. in support of Sullivan & Son in 2015. He moved to California in 2016 to move closer to his family.

In October 2017, Byrne was the supporting act for The Tenderloins in their "Impractical Jokers: Where's Larry? Tour".

Byrne spent the early part of 2018 directing a documentary about Las Vegas headliner, magician and comedian The Amazing Johnathan, entitled Always Amazin'. The documentary won best documentary film at the Sydney Lift Off Festival, Special Mention at Los Angeles Lift Off Festival, and was screened at Hollywood Now Festival, All Things Comedy Festival and Vancouver Just for Laughs Film Festival. Always Amazing was released in 2019 for free on YouTube.

From 2017–2018, Byrne wrote a script while on the road about his early years in stand up comedy, which eventually became The Opening Act. Byrne also directed the film, which was released October 16, 2020.

Byrne has had several television appearances. He was featured on the NBC series The Real Wedding Crashers and a featured comedian on The Tonight Show appearing ten times. He has made appearances on Chappelle's Show, Tough Crowd with Colin Quinn, @midnight, The History Channel's "History of the Joke," Mad TV's 300th episode and Super Bowl promos on CBS with Prince and again with Bill Cowher. His stand-up has been featured on The Late Late Show, Jimmy Kimmel Live!, Last Call with Carson Daly, BET's ComicView, ABC's Good Morning America as well as Comedy Central's Premium Blend. He has appeared on the Showtime comedy series Live Nude Comedy and shot a pilot for the G4 Network based on a Japanese Game Show called Drunken Businessman. He also was the winner of the MySpace Standup Or Sitdown competition on TBS.

Byrne has been a featured comic in The Just For Laughs Festival in Montreal, the HBO US Comedy Arts Festival in Las Vegas the TBS Very Funny Festivals in Chicago and Toronto and The CanWest Comedy Fest in Vancouver. He has been part of several national comedy tours including The Jameson Comedy Tour, Vince Vaughn's Wild West Comedy Tour, and The Camel Cigarettes Sin City Tour, and his own national MySpace tour. He has opened for musical acts Kanye West, Mariah Carey on her Charmbracelet Tour, Modest Mouse, Puddle of Mudd, Spoon, Rev. Horton Heat, and Kings of Leon. Byrne has toured with The Kims of Comedy with Bobby Lee of Mad TV and Ken Jeong of NBC's Community and The Hangover.

== Personal life ==
Byrne is married and has two children. In 2020 Byrne and his family moved from Los Angeles to Nashville.

== Filmography ==
=== Film ===
Film performances
2025	Clone Cops	Nefaricorp Spokesman	Video on demand Independent Film
