= Radio Rebel =

American television film

- Film poster
- Genre: Teen comedy-drama
- Based on: Shrinking Violet by Danielle Joseph
- Written by: Erik Patterson; Jessica Scott
- Directed by: Peter Howitt
- Starring: Debby Ryan; Merritt Patterson; Adam DiMarco; Sarena Parmar; Nancy Robertson
- Theme music composer: James Jandrisch
- Countries of origin: United States; Canada
- Original language: English

Production
- Executive producers: Jane Goldenring; Kim Arnott; Oliver De Gaigny; Michael Jacobs; Fernando Stew; Robin Synder
- Producer: Kim Arnott
- Cinematography: Kamal Derkaoui
- Editor: Richard Schwadel
- Running time: 85 minutes
- Production companies: MarVista Entertainment; Two 4 the Money Media; Disney Channel Original Productions

Original release
- Network: Disney Channel
- Release: February 17, 2012

Radio Rebel is a 2012 teen comedy-drama television film directed by Peter Howitt and written by Erik Patterson and Jessica Scott. Based on Danielle Joseph's 2009 novel Shrinking Violet, the film stars Debby Ryan as a shy high school student who secretly hosts a popular radio show under the alias "Radio Rebel". Merritt Patterson, Adam DiMarco, Sarena Parmar, and Nancy Robertson also star. Produced by MarVista Entertainment and Two 4 the Money Media, the film premiered on Disney Channel in the United States on February 17, 2012, attracting 4.3 million viewers.

== Plot ==
Shy teenager Tara Adams attends Lincoln Bay High in Seattle and secretly works as the city's most popular radio DJ, "Radio Rebel", unbeknownst to her friends Audrey, Larry, and Barry. Tara's crush Gavin and his friend Gabe are in a band called The G's, and hope to perform at prom.

Tara's stepfather Rob, who runs the radio station SlamFM, asks Tara about Radio Rebel in an attempt to bond with her. Her identity as Radio Rebel is subsequently discovered by Rob and her mother Delilah, and Rob invites her to host her show at SlamFM. Tara has doubts, but is inspired by another radio host, DJ Cami Q, whom she befriends. Audrey and Tara's friendship becomes strained as Tara continually declines invitations to spend time together; Tara eventually reveals her identity to Audrey.

Gavin leaves a copy of his band's demo in the drama room, which Tara takes and plays on her next show, encouraging students to start spontaneously dancing. Principal Moreno, feeling threatened by Radio Rebel's anti-authority message, threatens to expel anyone caught listening to the show. Cami Q arrives at school with a recording of Radio Rebel stating that she is taking back the music that Moreno took away. Moreno begins disciplining students who withhold information about Radio Rebel's identity. Eventually, Radio Rebel is nominated for prom queen, but Tara refuses to accept the crown to preserve her anonymity.

When Tara does not reveal herself, Moreno cancels the prom. With Cami's help, Tara and Audrey sneak into SlamFM and broadcast a call for students to express their true feelings. Tara then announces plans to hold a "Morp" (prom spelled backwards). Tara's rival Stacy begins to suspect that Tara is Radio Rebel and holds a house party at the same time as Radio Rebel's next broadcast. Tara attends while Delilah and Cami host the show using pre-recorded voice snippets. Stacy's friend Kim infiltrates SlamFM and obtains evidence that Tara is Radio Rebel.

At school, Gavin quits The G's, fed up with Gabe's egotistical personality. Stacy locks Tara in the janitor's closet and threatens to expose her. Tara agrees to support Stacy's prom queen campaign in exchange for keeping her secret. Gavin finds out and rebuffs Stacy's invitation to the Morp.

At the Morp, Moreno keeps watch for Radio Rebel as Cami announces the prom queen. When Radio Rebel wins, Tara overcomes her fears and reveals herself. When Moreno moves to expel her, other students come forward, each declaring "I am Radio Rebel". Unable to expel the entire student body, Moreno reluctantly backs down. Tara hands Stacy the crown, ending their rivalry, and Gavin performs a song dedicated to Tara.

== Cast ==
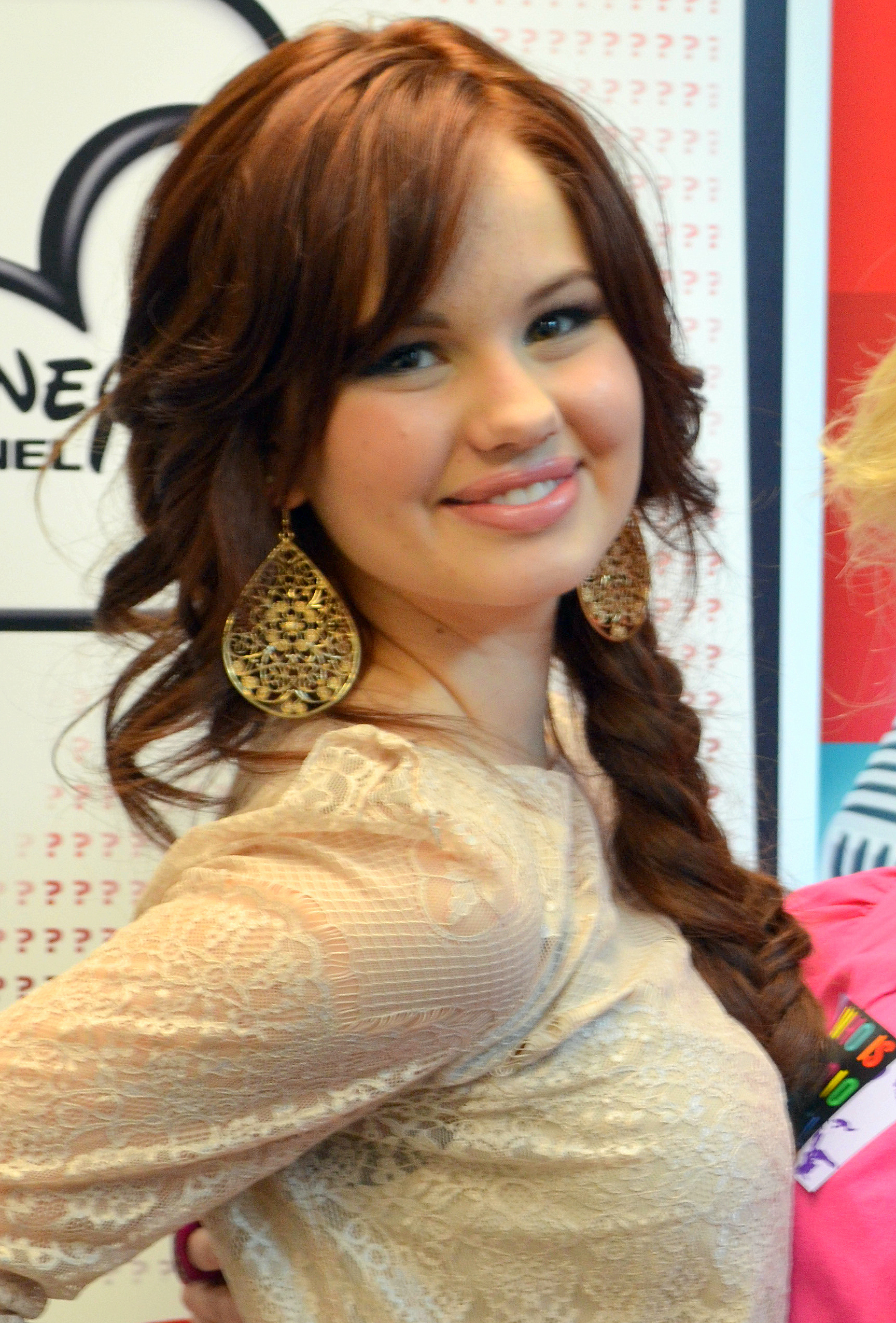
Ryan at the film's premiere in 2012

- Debby Ryan as Tara Adams, a shy student who secretly adopts the radio personality Radio Rebel
- Merritt Patterson as Stacy DeBane, the school's queen bee who is intent on becoming prom queen
- Adam DiMarco as Gavin, a member of The G's and Tara's love interest
- Sarena Parmar as Audrey Sharma, Tara's best friend
- Nancy Robertson as Principal Moreno
- Allie Bertram as Kim, Stacy's best friend
- Mercedes de la Zerda as DJ Cami Q, a radio host at SlamFM who befriends Tara
- Atticus Mitchell as Gabe, the lead singer of The G's
- Martin Cummins as Rob Lynch-Adams, Tara's stepfather who runs SlamFM
- April Telek as Delilah Adams, Tara's mother
- Iain Belcher as Barry, Tara's friend and Larry's twin
- Rowen Kahn as Larry, Tara's friend and Barry's twin

== Production ==
The film is based on Shrinking Violet, a 2009 young adult novel by Danielle Joseph about a shy Miami teenager who becomes an anonymous radio co-host at her stepfather's station. Several elements were changed for the adaptation, including the protagonist being renamed from Teresa to Tara and the radio persona being changed from "Sweet T" to "Radio Rebel".

Principal photography took place during the summer of 2011 in Vancouver. School scenes and some radio station interiors were filmed at Meadowridge Independent School in Maple Ridge, British Columbia. Michael Jacobs, Robyn Snyder, and MarVista Entertainment CEO Fernando Szew executive produced the film with Kim Arnott and Oliver De Caigny. Szew described the project as featuring "a tight, fast-paced and comedic script and an all-around talented cast, plus several original songs".

Ryan recorded two songs to promote the film: a cover of The Go-Go's' "We Got the Beat" and a collaboration with Chase Ryan and Chad Hively called "We Ended Right".

== Promotion ==
The film was accompanied by a week-long lineup called We Got the Beat Week consisting of new music videos and music-themed Disney Channel series and films.

== Soundtrack ==
Radio Rebel: Original Soundtrack

Soundtrack album by Various artists
- Released: February 21, 2012
- Recorded: 2012
- Genre: Pop rock
- Length: 41:01
- Label: Walt Disney Records

The Radio Rebel soundtrack album was released on February 21, 2012, by Walt Disney Records.

=== Track listing ===
Track listing
No.	Title	Artist	Length
1.	"We Got the Beat"	Debby Ryan	2:22
2.	"Can't Stop the Rock"	The Barrymores	2:34
3.	"Afterthought"	The Whereabouts	2:50
4.	"Turn It All Around"	The GGGG's	2:46
5.	"We So Fly"	The GGGG's	2:44
6.	"Brand New Day"	Kari Kimmel	2:37
7.	"Backing Off"	Champion	2:53
8.	"We Ended Right" (featuring Chad Hively and Chase Ryan)	Debby Ryan	4:06
9.	"No Advances"	Two Hours Traffic	3:18
10.	"Like You Love Her"	Fat Sue	3:48
11.	"Now I Can Be the Real Me"	The GGGG's	3:18
12.	"Touch the Ground" (featuring Maylee Todd)	Central Park	1:58
13.	"My Revolution"	Above Envy	2:37
14.	"A Wish Comes True Every Day"	Debby Ryan	3:11

== Reception ==
The film premiered to 4.3 million viewers on Disney Channel.

The New York Times television critic Jon Caramanica reviewed the film, noting its themes of teenage self-expression.

Common Sense Media gave the film a positive review, recommending it for ages seven and up. Reviewer Emily Ashby praised Ryan's performance and the film's messages about self-confidence and individuality, while noting that the character's shyness was at times difficult to believe.

== Broadcast ==
The film aired on Disney Channel in the United States on February 17, 2012. It premiered on March 9, 2012, in Canada on YTV, on June 1, 2012, on Disney Channel UK and Ireland, on June 17, 2012, on Disney Channel Asia, on July 6, 2012, on Disney Channel Australia, and on June 16, 2013, on Disney Channel South Africa.
