= The Lost Tomb of Jesus =

Pseudoarchaeological docudrama

- Directed by: Simcha Jacobovici
- Countries of origin: United States and Canada
- Original language: English

Production
- Producers: Felix Golubev; Ric Esther Bienstock

Original release
- Network: Discovery Channel; VisionTV
- Release: March 4, 2007

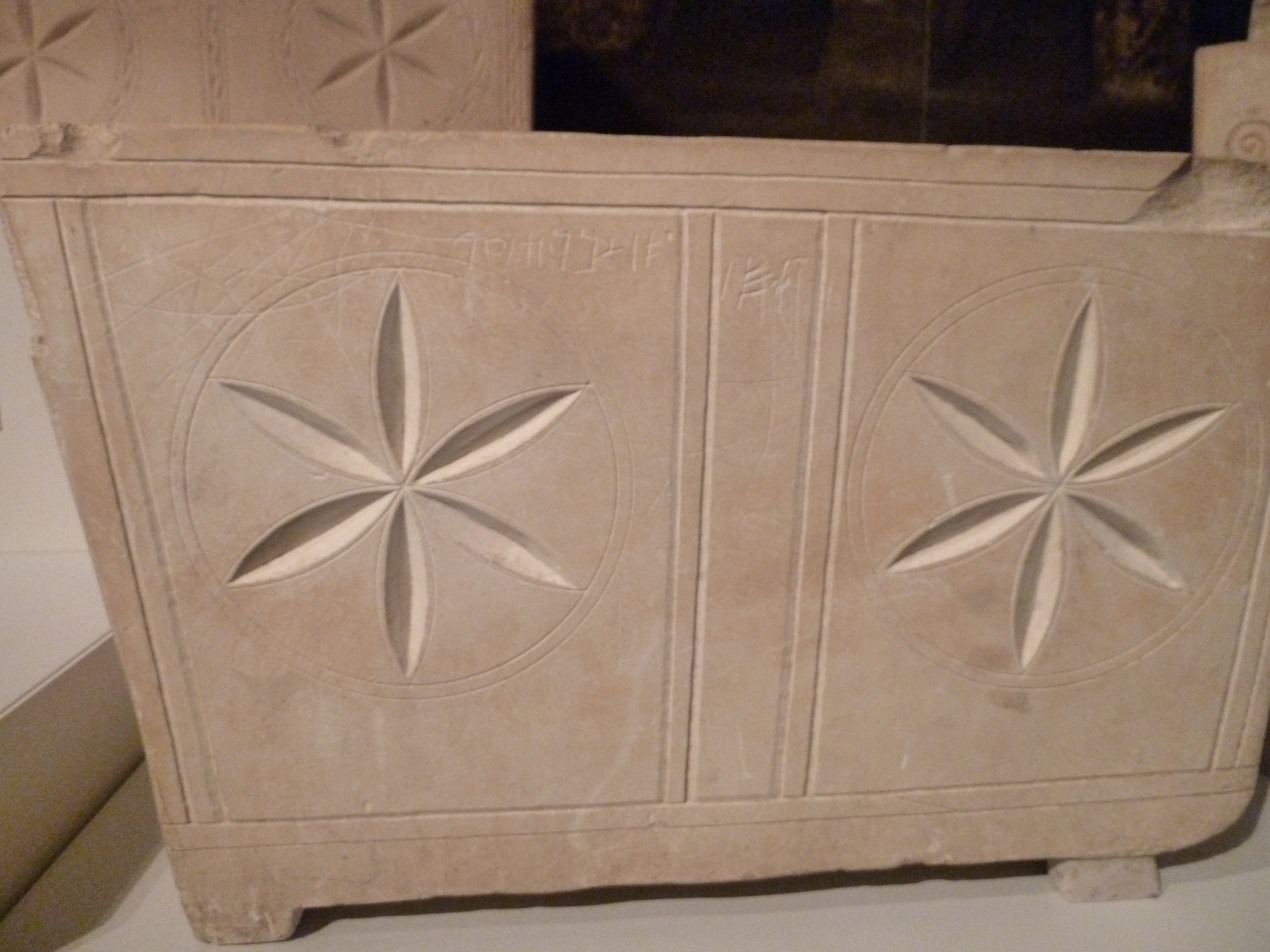
Ossuary of Jesus son of Joseph. The Israel Museum, Jerusalem

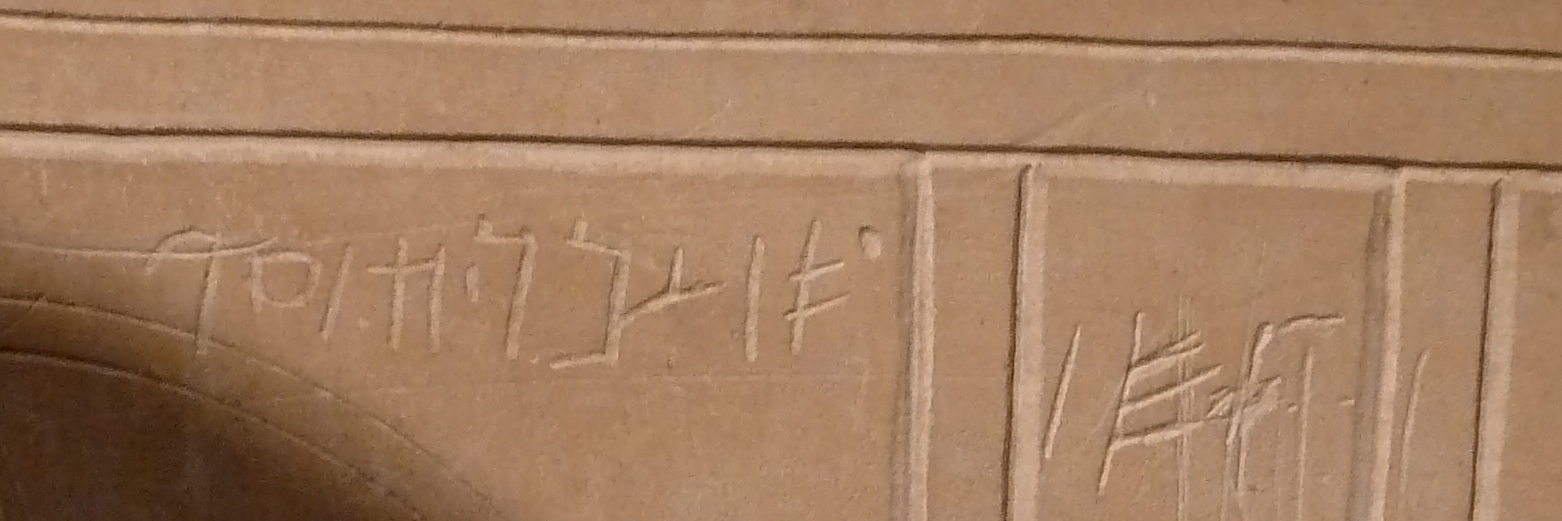
The inscription "ישו בר יוסף" "Jesus son of Joseph" on the Ossuary. The Israel Museum, Jerusalem

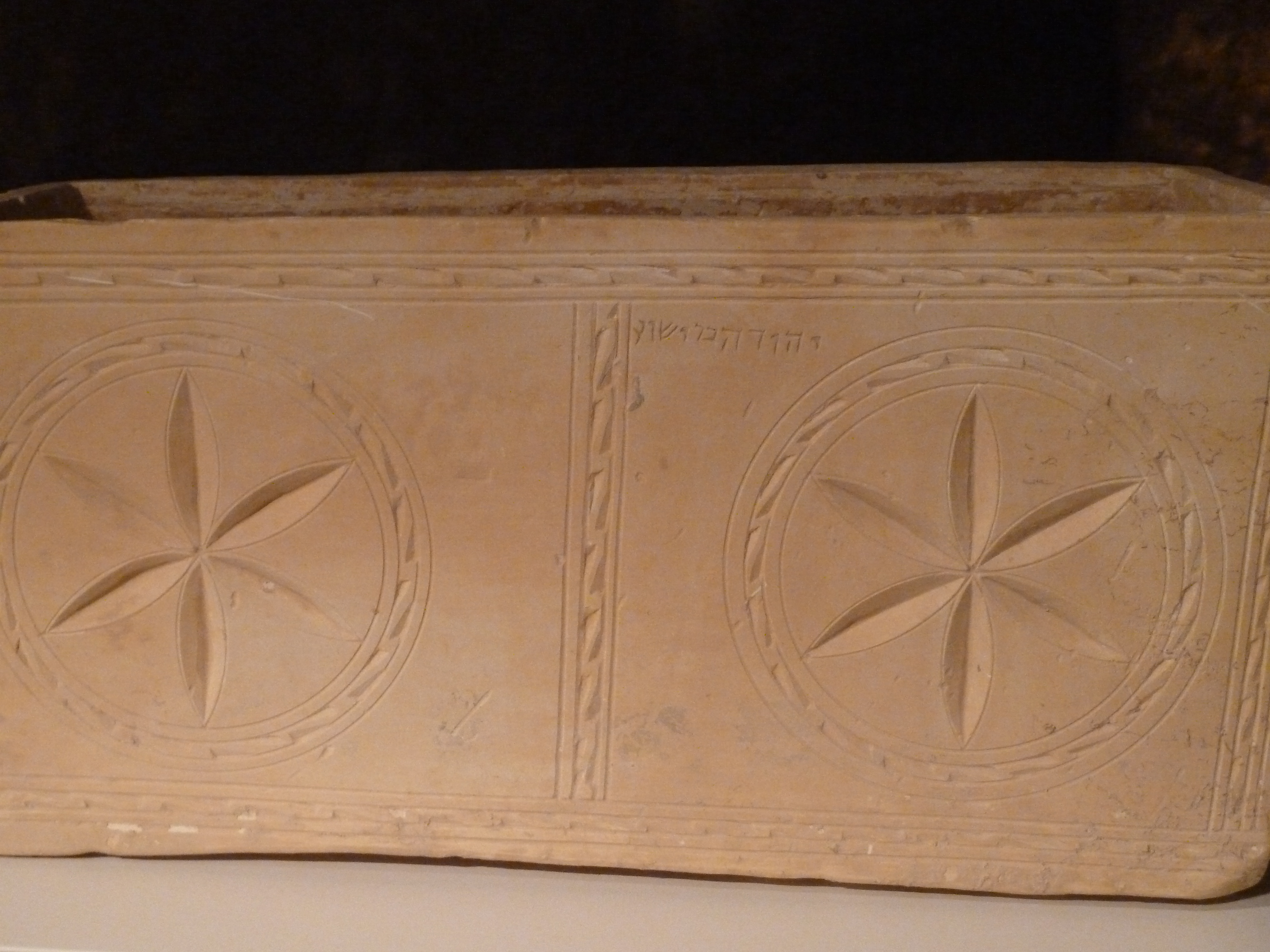
Ossuary of Judah son of Jesus. The Israel Museum, Jerusalem.

The Lost Tomb of Jesus is a pseudoarchaeological docudrama co-produced and first broadcast on the Discovery Channel and VisionTV in Canada on March 4, 2007, covering the discovery of the Talpiot Tomb. It was directed by Canadian documentary and film maker Simcha Jacobovici and produced by Felix Golubev and Ric Esther Bienstock, while James Cameron served as executive producer (Jacobovici and Cameron had previously created The Exodus Decoded). The film was released in conjunction with a book about the same subject, The Jesus Family Tomb, issued in late February 2007 and co-authored by Jacobovici and Charles R. Pellegrino. The documentary and the book's claims have been rejected by the overwhelming majority of leading experts within the archaeological and theological fields, as well as among linguistic and biblical scholars.

== Content ==
The film describes the finding of the Talpiot Tomb during a housing construction project, and posits that it was the family tomb of Jesus. The film states that ten ossuaries were found in the cave, of which six are the subject of the film. Further, it claims that one of the ten ossuaries went missing years ago, presumably stolen.

The excavation report for the predecessor of the Israel Antiquities Authority was written by Amos Kloner, a professor of archaeology at Israel's Bar-Ilan University. Kloner dissociated himself from the claims made in the documentary. He said it was incorrect to call it "never before reported information" and that he had published all the details in the journal Antiqot in 1996. He had not said it was the tomb of Jesus' family.

The inscription described as Yeshua` bar Yehosef is the most disputed.

Six of the nine remaining ossuaries bear inscriptions. The Lost Tomb of Jesus posits that three of those carry the names of figures from the New Testament. The meanings of the epigraphs are disputed. The makers of the documentary claim that four leading epigraphers have corroborated their interpretation of the inscriptions. As translated in The Lost Tomb of Jesus and The Jesus Family Tomb, they read as follows:

- Yeshua bar Yehosef -- Aramaic for "Jesus son of Joseph"
- Maria—written in Aramaic script, but a Latin form of the Hebrew name "Miriam" ("Mary")
- Yose—a diminutive of "Joseph" mentioned (in its Greek form ιωσης "Joses") as the name of one of Jesus's brothers in the New Testament (Mark 6:3)
- Yehuda bar Yeshua—possibly Aramaic for "Judah son of Jesus"
- Mariamene e Mara—according to the filmmakers this is Greek for "Mary known as the master." The similar name "Mariamne" is found in the Acts of Philip. Francois Bovon, professor of the history of religion at Harvard University has said, based on his study of that work, "I do not believe that Mariamne is the real name of Mary of Magdalene. Mariamne is, besides Maria or Mariam, a possible Greek equivalent, attested by Josephus, Origen, and the Acts of Philip, for the Semitic Myriam."
- Matya—Hebrew for 'Matthew'—not claimed to be Matthew the Evangelist but "possibly a husband of one of the women in an unmarked ossuary." The filmmakers claim that there is evidence that Mary mother of Jesus had many relatives named Matthew.

The film further claims that the tenth ossuary, which went missing years ago, is the James Ossuary purported to contain the body of James, the brother of Jesus.

In The Jesus Family Tomb, Simcha Jacobovici claims the James Ossuary would have been a part of this tomb, but was removed by artifact dealers, and thus discovered separately. The James Ossuary's authenticity has been called into question, and Oded Golan, one of its past owners, was charged with fraud in connection to the artifact, but exonerated on all counts of forgery.

Ben Witherington III, who worked with Jacobovici on a Discovery Channel documentary on the James Ossuary, denies this connection on two grounds:

- "The James Ossuary, according to the report of the antiquities dealer that Oded Golan got the ossuary from, said that the ossuary came from Silwan, not Talpiot, and had dirt in it that matched up with the soil in that particular spot in Jerusalem."
- "Furthermore, Eusebius reports that the tomb marker for James's burial was close to where James was martyred near the temple mount, indeed near the famous tombs in the Kidron Valley such as the so-called Tomb of Absalom. Talpiot is nowhere near this locale."

Another consideration was that the measurements of the James Ossuary did not match the measurements listed for the tenth ossuary, which is no longer stored with the rest of the collection. The James Ossuary was listed as being approximately 50 centimeters (19.6 inches) long by 30 centimeters (11.8 inches) wide on one end, and 25.5 centimeters (10 inches) on the other end. The tenth ossuary in the Talpiot collection is listed as 60 centimeters (23.6 inches) long by 26 centimeters (10.2 inches) by 30 centimeters (11.8 inches). Furthermore, Amos Kloner has stated that the tenth ossuary had no inscription. Also, Joe Zias, former curator of the Rockefeller Museum who received and catalogued the ossuaries, refuted this claim on his personal site.

New information has now shown that the discrepancy in the measurements had to do with measuring the base of the ossuary, which is indeed 50 centimeters (19.6 inches), rather than the length. The top length of the James Ossuary, not the base, which is trapezoidal in shape, according to the latest re-measurement carried out by the Israel Antiquities Authority, is 57.5 centimeters (22.6 inches.). While compelling, this does not prove that the James Ossuary is the missing tenth Talpiot ossuary.

== DNA tests ==
Analysis of mitochondrial DNA performed by Lakehead University on the remains found in the ossuary marked "Jesus son of Joseph" and the one marked "Mariamne" or "Mary" (who some claim to be Mary Magdalene) found that the two occupants were not blood relations on their mothers' side. Based on these tests, the makers of the documentary suggest that "Jesus" and "Mariamne" were probably married "because otherwise they would not have been buried together in a family tomb," but the remains were not dated using radiocarbon to further sustain this supposition. Neither was any DNA from the other ossuaries tested to see whether or not any familial relation existed there. Additionally, scholars argue that the DNA tests only prove that they did not have the same mother and they could easily have been father/daughter, cousins, half brother/sister, or any number of possibilities that do not include a matrilineage line.

== New views of Jesus endorsed by the film ==
=== Christian views ===
The film proposes new interpretations of the events regarding Jesus depicted in the New Testament, as seen by mainstream Christianity. The film's suggestions contradict the basis of the faith and may be considered blasphemous by Christians:

- Jesus remains found (see Death and resurrection of Jesus, Nicene Creed)
  - Presumably only spiritual ascension, not a bodily ascension (see Hypostatic union, resurrecting Lazarus)
- Mary remains found (see Assumption of Mary, Dormition of the Theotokos)
- Jesus being married (see Clerical celibacy (Catholic Church))
- Jesus having a child (see Clerical celibacy (Catholic Church))
- Jesus having brothers and/or sisters (see the discussion about Jesus' siblings)
  - Presumably Mary not being virgin (see the perpetual virginity of Mary)
- New tomb of Jesus (see Church of the Holy Sepulchre)
  - Presumably Jesus body being moved (see Empty tomb)
- Ordaining women (see apostolic succession, Ordination, Ordination of women)
- Appeal to sources not included in the Biblical canon, of Gnostic origin, such as the Gospel of Mary Magdalene or Acts of Philip, considered by scholars to be written later (see Origin of the canonical Gospels, dating of canonical Gospels, New Testament apocrypha)

The claim that Jesus was married also undermines the theological metaphor of the Church being the "Bride of Christ" (found in the writings of the New Testament). Jimmy Akin, director of Apologetics and Evangelization at Catholic Answers, wrote: "This image would never have arisen if there was a Mrs. Jesus living right there in Jerusalem…. We know about [the wives of religion founders] because they were honored figures as wives of The Founder, and if Jesus had a wife then (a) we would know about it and (b) the whole Church-as-the-Bride-of-Christ metaphor would never have come into existence." As for a possible "son of Jesus," he noted: "We tend to know about even the daughters of religious founders. Muhammad's daughter Fatima comes to mind. It would be much harder to sneak a forgotten son by the eyes of history…. It's not just hard to sneak sons past because patriarchal cultures focus more on sons; it's also because of this: In traditional societies, the son is looked on as the father's natural successor."

The filmmakers denied that the claims made in the film contradicted key teachings of Christianity, such as the resurrection and ascension. The film's religious consultant James Tabor stated that the fact that Jesus' tomb was discovered does not put in doubt biblical accounts of his resurrection, which he said could have been spiritual. With regard to the ascension, the documentary's website suggests that while the tomb's discovery does not render impossible the notion of a spiritual ascension, it does contradict the belief that Jesus physically ascended to heaven.

=== Islamic views ===
Finding someone's remains in Jesus' tomb conforms to the Muslim belief that a substitute for him was crucified, while he was raised bodily to heaven. The Islamic view of his disappearance, as mentioned in the Qur'an, states: That they said (in boast), "We killed Al-Masih 'Isa the son of Maryam, the Messenger of God"; but they killed him not, nor crucified him, but so it was made to appear to them. The general Muslim interpretation of the verse is that God, to revenge from Judas' betrayal to Jesus (the fatherless prophet), made his face similar to that of Jesus, while Jesus ascended into heaven and is to return near the end of time and kill the anti-Christ. Accordingly, the discovered remains in his tomb would then actually belong to Judas, a Roman guard, or a volunteering disciple.

== Reception ==
Following the March 4, 2007, airing of The Lost Tomb of Jesus on the Discovery Channel, American journalist Ted Koppel aired a program entitled The Lost Tomb of Jesus—A Critical Look, whose guests included the director Simcha Jacobovici, James Tabor, Chair of the Department of Religious Studies at the University of North Carolina at Charlotte who served as a consultant and advisor on the documentary, Jonathan Reed, Professor of Religion at the University of La Verne and co-author of Excavating Jesus Beneath the Stones, Behind the Text, and William Dever, an archaeologist with over 50 years experience in Middle Eastern archaeological digs.

Alan Cooperman, writer of The Washington Post article also states this: "Similar assessments came yesterday from two Israeli scholars, Amos Kloner, who originally excavated the tomb, and Joe Zias, former curator of archaeology at the Israeli Antiquities Authority. Kloner told the Jerusalem Post that the documentary is "nonsense." Zias described it in an e-mail to The Washington Post as a "hyped up film which is intellectually and scientifically dishonest."

Israeli archaeologist Amos Kloner, who was among the first to examine the tomb when it was first discovered, said the names marked on the coffins were very common at the time. "I don't accept the news that it was used by Jesus or his family," and "The documentary filmmakers are using it to sell their film." he told the BBC News website.

During the documentary The Lost Tomb of Jesus, various professionals had claimed:

1. concerning the ossuaries marked Yeshua` ("Jesus") and the one believed to be that of Mary Magdalene: because "the DNA did not match, the forensic archaeologist concluded that they must be husband and wife";
2. that testing showed that there was a match between the patina on the James and Yeshua` ossuaries and referred to the James ossuary as the "missing link" from the tomb of Yeshua` (Jesus);
3. and that an ossuary that became missing from the tomb of Yeshua` had actually been the infamous James ossuary believed to contain the remains of the brother of Yeshua`.

During Ted Koppel's critique, The Lost Tomb of Jesus—a Critical Look, Koppel revealed he had denials from these three people that Simcha Jacobovici had misquoted in the documentary.

1. Koppel had a written denial from the forensic archaeologist asserting that he had NOT concluded that the remains of Yeshua` and Miriamne showed they were husband and wife. In fact, he had logically stated, "you cannot genetically test for marriage."
2. Koppel had a written denial from the Suffolk Crime Lab Director (Robert Genna) asserting that he had NOT stated the James ossuary patina matched that of the Yeshua` ossuary. He denied ever saying they were a match, and said he'd have to do much more comparison testing of other tombs before he could draw any conclusions.
3. Koppel had a verbal denial from Professor Amos Kloner, the archaeologist who had supervised the initial 1980 dig of the tomb of Yeshua`, with whom he spoke on 3/4/07, asserting that the ossuary that later turned up missing from the alleged Tomb of 'Jesus' could not have been what is now known as the James ossuary. In fact he indicated there was evidence that it was not the same by saying that the now missing ossuary he had seen and photographed and catalogued in 1980 had been totally unmarked, whereas the James ossuary is marked with the name of James and a rosette.

The archaeologist William Dever summed it up when he stated on Koppel's critical analysis, The Lost Tomb of Jesus—A Critical Look, that Jacobovici's and Cameron's "conclusions were already drawn in the beginning" of the inquiry and that their "argument goes far beyond any reasonable interpretation."

== Archaeological questions ==
=== The three skulls ===
Three skulls were found on the floor of the tomb in 1980 which the film makers assert was usual but others disagree: "This too was decidedly not typical. In ancient Jerusalem, the dead were placed inside tombs; in tombs, the dead were placed inside ossuaries. If anything was left behind, it was a lamp or a bottle of perfume, not skulls."

== Criticism of the documentary ==
Early Christianity scholar R. Joseph Hoffmann, chair of the Committee for the Scientific Examination of Religion (CSER) charges that the film "is all about bad assumptions," beginning with the idea that the boxes contain Jesus of Nazareth and his family. He also stated that "the assumptions underlying this project are not only flawed but positively malicious to good scholarship and science".

When interviewed about the upcoming documentary, Amos Kloner (Bar-Ilan University), who oversaw the original archaeological dig of this tomb in 1980 said:

"It makes a great story for a TV film, but it's completely impossible. It's nonsense."

Newsweek reports that Joe Zias, the archaeologist who personally numbered the ossuaries dismissed any potential connection:

"Simcha [Jacobovici] has no credibility whatsoever," says Joe Zias, who was the curator for anthropology and archaeology at the Rockefeller Museum in Jerusalem from 1972 to 1997 and personally numbered the Talpiot ossuaries. "He's pimping off the Bible … He got this guy Cameron, who made Titanic or something like that—what does this guy know about archaeology? I am an archeologist, but if I were to write a book about brain surgery, you would say, 'Who is this guy?' People want signs and wonders. Projects like these make a mockery of the archaeological profession."

Stephen Pfann (University of the Holy Land) also thinks the inscription read as "Jesus" has been misread and suggests that the name "Hanun" might be a more accurate rendering.

The Washington Post reports that William G. Dever, who has been working as an archaeologist in Israel for 50 years, offered the following:

"I've known about these ossuaries for many years and so have many other archaeologists, and none of us thought it was much of a story, because these are rather common Jewish names from that period. It's a publicity stunt, and it will make these guys very rich, and it will upset millions of innocent people because they don't know enough to separate fact from fiction."

Asbury Theological Seminary's Ben Witherington III points out some other circumstantial problems with linking this tomb to Jesus' family:

- "So far as we can tell, the earliest followers of Jesus never called Jesus 'son of Joseph'. It was outsiders who mistakenly called him that."
- "The ancestral home of Joseph was Bethlehem, and his adult home was Nazareth. The family was still in Nazareth after he [Joseph] was apparently dead and gone. Why in the world would he be buried (alone at this point) in Jerusalem?"
- "One of the ossuaries has the name Jude son of Jesus. We have no historical evidence of such a son of Jesus, indeed we have no historical evidence he was ever married."
- "The Mary ossuaries (there are two) do not mention anyone from Migdal. It simply has the name Mary—and that's about the most common of all ancient Jewish female names."
- "We have names like Matthew on another ossuary, which don't match up with the list of [Jesus's] brothers' names."

The Archaeological Institute of America, self-described on their website as "North America's oldest and largest organization devoted to the world of archaeology," has published online their own criticism of the "Jesus tomb" claim:

"The identification of the Talpiyot tomb as the tomb of Jesus and his family is based on a string of problematic and unsubstantiated claims [...] [It] contradicts the canonical Gospel accounts of the death and burial of Jesus and the earliest Christian traditions about Jesus. This claim is also inconsistent with all of the available information—historical and archaeological—about how Jews in the time of Jesus buried their dead, and specifically the evidence we have about poor, non-Judean families like that of Jesus. It is a sensationalistic claim without any scientific basis or support."

Archeologist and biblical scholar Jerome Murphy-O’Connor, (École biblique et archéologique française de Jérusalem) dismissed the movie as a "commercial ploy".

In a debate with The Dallas Morning News evangelical scholar Darrell L. Bock (Dallas Theological Seminary) and agnostic scholar Bart D. Ehrman (University of North Carolina at Chapel Hill) both concluded that the Talpiot Tomb has no connection whatsoever with the historical Jesus.

In a 2015 article for the CNN website Joel S. Baden (Yale Divinity School) and Candida Moss (University of Notre Dame) dismissed Jacobovici's and Shimron's theory, stating that "the evidence is faulty, and the story doesn't make sense."

Speaking to the Catholic website Aleteia, Mark Goodacre (Duke University) stated that "I don’t think there is any merit in the identification of the Talpiot Tomb with Jesus and his family. All along, Jacobovici has not taken seriously contradictory evidence, like the presence of ‘Judah son of Jesus’ in the tomb. He has also overplayed the idea that Mary Magdalene is found in the tomb, and that she was married to Jesus". Similar opinions were expressed by Ian Boxall (Catholic University of America).

Stephen Miletic (Franciscan University of Steubenville) stated that Jacobovici presented "a very non-credible case. Too many ‘what ifs’ need to work. If Jesus was from Nazareth, and, if his adoptive father Joseph died before his public ministry, then it is most likely Joseph would have been buried in Nazareth. So, how did the ‘family plot,’ so to speak get to Jerusalem? Did Christians move them some time after Roman occupation? Any records of such a move (e.g., receipts of purchase for the land, etc.)?"

Writing on the Biblical Archaeology Review, Hershel Shanks described the idea that the James Ossuary came from the Talpiot tomb as “nonsense", underlining that “It all depends on Jesus’ body having been moved after his initial burial in the rock-cut family tomb of Joseph of Arimathea. The overwhelming likelihood is that this tomb was located where the Church of the Holy Sepulchre now stands. If Jesus already had a family tomb in Talpiot, there would be no need to bury him in a temporary tomb, despite the onset of the Sabbath. It’s little more than a half-hour’s walk from Golgotha to Talpiot.”

=== Scholars misquoted ===
Most scholars interviewed in the docu-drama later protested against Cameron and Jacobovici, accusing them of distorting their words:

- Archeologist Shimon Gibson (University of North Carolina at Charlotte) stated that he never claimed that Talpiot Tomb may be related to Jesus of Nazareth. In fact, he had clearly stated that he was very skeptical about that claim;
- Epigrapher Frank Moore Cross (Harvard University) denied having claimed that the names on the ossuary were related to the family of Jesus of Nazareth, noting that those names were extremely common in the 1st century CE and that the statistics in the movie were unpersuasive;
- Genetist Carney Matheson (Griffith University) denied supporting the idea that the Yeshua and Mariamne in the tomb were husband and wife, and that he had only stated that those two sets were not maternally related;
- Biblical scholar François Bovon (Harvard Divinity School) denied having ever claimed that the Mariamne in the Talpiot Tomb is Mary Magdalene.
- Father Jerome Murphy-O'Connor (École Biblique) denied having supported the idea that the Talpiot Tomb is Jesus's family tomb and dismissed the movie as "a commercial ploy".

Shimon Gibson later published an essay together with Amos Kloner, stating that he believes that the Tomb of Jesus is in the Holy Sepulchre, not in the Talpiot Tomb.

=== DNA and family evidence ===
Darrell Bock, a New Testament scholar and research professor of New Testament studies at Dallas Theological Seminary points out some of the inconsistencies, including: "If Jesus' family came from Galilee, why would they have a family tomb in Jerusalem?"

Ben Witherington III points out an inconsistency related to the James Ossuary. He points out that the James Ossuary came from Silwan, not Talpiot. In addition, the James Ossuary had dirt on it that "matched up with the soil in that particular spot in Jerusalem." In his opinion, this is problematic, because "the ossuaries that came out of Talpiot came out of a rock cave from a different place, and without such soil in it." Therefore, he believes that it is difficult to believe that the one known family member of Jesus was buried separately and far away from Jesus' family.

In addition, during the trial of antiquities dealer Oded Golan there has been testimony from former FBI agent Gerald Richard that a photo of the James ossuary, showing it in Golan's home, was taken in the 1970s, based on tests done by the FBI photo lab. This would make it impossible for the James Ossuary to have been discovered with the rest of the Talpiot ossuaries in the 1980s.

The archaeologist Dan Bahat (Bar-Ilan University) has expressed skepticism about any possible connection between the Talpiot Tomb and the James Ossuary, underlining that "If it [the James Ossuary] were found there, the man who made the forgery would have taken something better. He would have taken Jesus."

With reference to the DNA tests, Ben Witherington III wrote in his blog: "[T]he most the DNA evidence can show is that several of these folks are interrelated…. We would need an independent control sample from some member of Jesus' family to confirm that these were members of Jesus' family. We do not have that at all." This quote clarifies the fact that the documentarians do not believe they have tested the DNA and have proven it to be Jesus. They simply used DNA testing to prove that the "Jesus son of Joseph" and the "Mariamne" in this tomb were not maternally related (i.e. that they did not have the same mother or grandmother). The film asserted that this DNA evidence suggests they were probably spouses. Critics contend they could have been paternally related (e.g. father and daughter, or grandfather and granddaughter), or related by someone else's marriage. Mariamne could just as well have been the wife of one of the other two males in the ossuary.

The New York Times article of February 27, 2007, (reprinted in full on many websites) states:

The documentary's director and its driving force, Simcha Jacobovici…, said there was enough mitochondrial DNA for a laboratory in Ontario to conclude that the bodies in the "Jesus" and "Mary Magdalene" ossuaries were not related on their mothers' side. From this, Mr. Jacobovici deduced that they were a couple, because otherwise they would not have been buried together in a family tomb. In an interview, Mr. Jacobovici was asked why the filmmakers did not conduct DNA testing on the other ossuaries to determine whether the one inscribed Judah, son of Jesus was genetically related to either the Jesus or Mary Magdalene boxes; or whether the Jesus remains were actually the offspring of Mary. "We're not scientists. At the end of the day we can't wait till every ossuary is tested for DNA," he said. "We took the story that far. At some point you have to say, I've done my job as a journalist."

In the televised debate following the airing of the film, Ted Koppel pressed Jacobovici on the same question and received the same response. According to the authors of one blog, "the response is manifestly disingenuous. The question, in fact, necessarily arises whether the team or one of its members decided not to proceed with any further DNA tests. Such tests may have revealed that none of the ossuaries are related—hence defeating the underlying presupposition that the crypt was in fact a family tomb, and thereby eliminating any valid basis at all for producing and showing the film."

William G. Dever said that some of the inscriptions on the ossuaries are unclear, but that all of the names are common. "I've known about these ossuaries for many years and so have many other archaeologists, and none of us thought it was much of a story because these are rather common Jewish names from that period. It's a publicity stunt, and it will make these guys very rich, and it will upset millions of innocent people because they don't know enough to separate fact from fiction."

Jodi Magness, an archaeologist at the University of North Carolina-Chapel Hill, notes that at the time of Jesus, wealthy families buried their dead in tombs cut by hand from solid rock, putting the bones in niches in the walls and then, later, transferring them to ossuaries. "If Jesus' family had been wealthy enough to afford a rock-cut tomb, it would have been in Nazareth, not Jerusalem," Magness writes.

According to Magness, the names on the Talpiot ossuaries indicate that the tomb belonged to a family from Judea, the area around Jerusalem, where people were known by their first name and father's name. As Galileans, Jesus and his family members would have used their first name and hometown. "This whole case (for the tomb of Jesus) is flawed from beginning to end."

There is no information on analyzing relation of "Mary" and "Jesus son of Joseph" or any other tomb occupants. In Jewish tradition of the time, after one year, when bodies in rock-cut tombs were decomposed, bones were collected, cleaned and then finally placed in an ossuary. Due to this conduct there is no real assurance that what film-makers have really examined are remnants of "Mariamne e Mara" and "Jesus son of Joseph."

=== Interpretation of the inscriptions ===
David Mavorah, a curator of the Israel Museum in Jerusalem, points out that the names on the ossuaries were extremely common. "We know that Joseph, Jesus and Mariamne were all among the most common names of the period. To start with all these names being together in a single tomb and leap from there to say this is the tomb of Jesus is a little far-fetched, to put it politely."

Professor Amos Kloner, former Jerusalem district archaeologist of the Israel Antiquities Authority and the first archaeologist to examine the tomb in 1980, told the Yedioth Ahronoth newspaper that the name Jesus had been found 71 times in burial caves at around that time. Furthermore, he said that the inscription on the ossuary is not clear enough to ascertain, and although the idea fails to hold up by archaeological standards, it makes for profitable television. Quote: "The new evidence is not serious, and I do not accept that it is connected to the family of Jesus…. They just want to get money for it."

Richard Bauckham (University of St Andrews), catalogued ossuary names from that region since 1980. He records that based on the catalogue, "Jesus" was the 6th most popular name of Jewish men, and "Mary/Mariamne" was the single most popular name of Jewish women at that time. Therefore, finding two ossuaries containing the names "Jesus" and "Mary/Mariamne" is not significant at all, and the chances of it being the ossuaries of Jesus and Mary Magdalene are "very small indeed."

Concerning the inscription attributed to Jesus son of Joseph, Steve Caruso, a professional Aramaic translator using a computer to visualize different interpretations, claims that although it is possible to read it as "Yeshua" that "overall it is a very strong possibility that this inscription is not 'Yeshua` bar Yehosef.'"

The name "Mary" and its derivatives may have been used by up to 25% of Jewish women at that time.

=== Publicity ===
Lawrence E. Stager, the Dorot professor of archaeology of Israel at Harvard, said the documentary was "exploiting the whole trend that caught on with The Da Vinci Code. One of the problems is there are so many biblically illiterate people around the world that they don't know what is real judicious assessment and what is what some of us in the field call 'fantastic archaeology.'"

William G. Dever said, "I'm not a Christian. I'm not a believer. I don't have a dog in this fight. I just think it's a shame the way this story is being hyped and manipulated."

Jodi Magness criticized the decision of the documentary makers to make their claims at a news conference rather than in a peer-reviewed scientific article. By going directly to the media, she said, the filmmakers "have set it up as if it's a legitimate academic debate, when the vast majority of scholars who specialize in archaeology of this period have flatly rejected this."

Joe Zias, former curator of archaeology at the Israeli Antiquities Authority, described it in an e-mail to The Washington Post as a "hyped-up film which is intellectually and scientifically dishonest." He also wrote an extended Viewers Guide to Understanding the Talpiot Tomb documentary, published on his web site. François Bovon has also written to say that his comments were misused. In a letter to the Society of Biblical Literature, he wrote:

As I was interviewed for the Discovery Channel's program The Lost Tomb of Jesus, I would like to express my opinion here.

First, I have now seen the program and am not convinced of its main thesis. When I was questioned by Simcha Jacobovici and his team the questions were directed toward the Acts of Philip and the role of Mariamne in this text. I was not informed of the whole program and the orientation of the script.

Second, having watched the film, in listening to it, I hear two voices, a kind of double discourse. On one hand there is the wish to open a scholarly discussion; on the other there is the wish to push a personal agenda. I must say that the reconstructions of Jesus' marriage with Mary Magdalene and the birth of a child belong for me to science fiction.

Third, to be more credible, the program should deal with the very ancient tradition of the Holy Sepulcher, since the emperor Constantine in the fourth century C.E. built this monument on the spot at which the emperor Hadrian in the second century C.E. erected the forum of Aelia Capitolina and built on it a temple to Aphrodite at the place where Jesus' tomb was venerated.

Fourth, I do not believe that Mariamne is the real name of Mary of Magdalene. Mariamne is, besides Maria or Mariam, a possible Greek equivalent, attested by Josephus, Origen, and the Acts of Philip, for the Semitic Myriam.

Fifth, the Mariamne of the Acts of Philip is part of the apostolic team with Philip and Bartholomew; she teaches and baptizes. In the beginning, her faith is stronger than Philip's faith. This portrayal of Mariamne fits very well with the portrayal of Mary of Magdala in the Manichean Psalms, the Gospel of Mary, and Pistis Sophia. My interest is not historical, but on the level of literary traditions. I have suggested this identification in 1984 already in an article of New Testament Studies.

François Bovon, Harvard Divinity School

==== Symposium and media coverage ====
Following a symposium at Princeton Theological Seminary in January 2008 media interest in the Talpiot tomb was reignited. Time and CNN devoted extensive coverage, implying that the case had been re-opened.

Scholars who had been present at the symposium then accused Jacobovici and Cameron of misleading the media in claiming the symposium reopened their theory as viable. Several scholars, including all the archaeologists and epigraphers, who delivered papers at the symposium issued an open letter of complaint claiming misrepresentation, saying that Jacobovici and Cameron's claims of support from the symposium are "nothing further from the truth" and also "that the majority of scholars in attendance—including all of the archaeologists and epigraphers who presented papers relating to the tomb—either reject the identification of the Talpiot tomb as belonging to Jesus’ family or find this claim highly speculative" and that "the probability of the Talpiot tomb belonging to Jesus’ family is virtually nil".

Géza Vermes (a major and well-respected scholar on the historical Jesus) issued a statement saying that ”The evidence so far advanced falls far short of proving that the Talpiot tomb is, or even could be, the tomb of the family of Jesus of Nazareth. The identification of the ossuary of Mariamne with that of Mary Magdalene of the Gospels has no support whatever and without it the case collapses. The conference, primarily devoted to the problem of afterlife in Second Temple Judaism, was useful in airing the latest views on ancient Jewish burial practices and modern science. Apart from a handful of participants, the large majority of the assembled scholars consider the theory that the Talpiot ossuaries contained the remains of Jesus of Nazareth and his family as unlikely after the conference as it has been before. In my historical judgment, the matter is, and in the absence of substantial new evidence, should remain closed".

Historian André Lemaire also issued a statement, saying that "On the whole, it seems clear enough to me not only that the identification of the Talpiot tomb as the family tomb of Jesus is not probable or even likely but that it is very improbable".

Princeton Theological Seminary issued a letter following the controversy and reiterated concerns that:

"the press following the symposium gave almost the exact opposite impression (of the symposium's results), stating, instead, that the conference proceedings gave credence to the identification of the Talpiot tomb with a putative family tomb of Jesus of Nazareth. As is abundantly clear from the statements to the contrary that have been issued since the symposium by many of the participants, such representations are patently false and blatantly misrepresent the spirit and scholarly content of the deliberations."

The proceedings of the symposium were edited by James Charlesworth and published. At the end of the symposium, Charlesworth stated: “Most archaeologists, epigraphers, and other scientists argued persuasively that there is no reason to conclude that the Talpiot Tomb was Jesus’ tomb.”

== DVD editions ==
On March 15, 2007, Discovery Channel released a DVD of the documentary with a listed running time of two hours.

== See also ==
- Death and resurrection of Jesus
- Historical Jesus
- James Ossuary
- New Testament view on Jesus' life

== Published References ==
Don Sausa (2007). The Jesus Tomb : Is It Fact or Fiction? Scholars Chime In. The Vision Press. ISBN 978-0-9788346-9-2.
