= The Jesus Family Tomb =

2007 book by Charles R. Pellegrino

The Jesus Family Tomb: The Discovery, the Investigation, and the Evidence That Could Change History
- Author: Simcha Jacobovici, Charles R. Pellegrino
- Language: English
- Genre: Non-fiction
- Publication date: February 2007
- ISBN: 0061192023

The Jesus Family Tomb: The Discovery, the Investigation, and the Evidence That Could Change History (ISBN 0061192023) is a controversial book by Simcha Jacobovici and Charles R. Pellegrino (with a Foreword by James Cameron) published in February 2007. It tells the story of the discovery of the Talpiot Tomb on Friday March 28, 1980 (two days before Palm Sunday) and makes an argument that it is the tomb of Jesus Christ and his family.

The book is a tie-in with the documentary The Lost Tomb of Jesus, which was released on the Discovery Channel in early March 2007.

== The Names in the Tomb ==
The tomb in Talpiot, excavated in 1980 during salvage archaeology, originally contained ten ossuaries – bone boxes for secondary burial. Of the ten, one vanished – presumably stolen – right after it had been catalogued. This may be the tomb of Jesus' brother James (see James Ossuary), although such claim is refuted by the professor who oversaw the archaeological work. Of the other nine, six were inscribed with names. As translated in The Lost Tomb of Jesus and The Jesus Family Tomb, they read as follows:

- Ossuary #80/503 Y'shua bar Yosef – Aramaic for "Jesus son of Joseph".
- Ossuary #80/505 Maria – written in Aramaic script, but a Latin form of the Hebrew name "Miriam" ("Mary")
- Ossuary #80/504 Yose – a diminutive of "Joseph" mentioned (in its Greek form ιωσης "Joses") as the name of one of Jesus's brothers in the New Testament (Mark 6:3)
- Ossuary #80/501 Yehuda bar Yeshua – possibly Aramaic for "Judah son of Jesus".
- Ossuary #80/500 Mariamene e Mara – according to the filmmakers this is Greek for "Mary known as the master." The similar name "Mariamne" is found in the Acts of Philip. Francois Bovon, professor of the history of religion at Harvard University has said, based on his study of that work, "I do not believe that Mariamne is the real name of Mary of Magdalene. Mariamne is, besides Maria or Mariam, a possible Greek equivalent, attested by Josephus, Origen, and the Acts of Philip, for the Semitic Myriam."
- Matya – Hebrew for 'Matthew' – not claimed to be Matthew the Evangelist but "possibly a husband of one of the women in an unmarked ossuary". The filmmakers claim that there is evidence that Mary mother of Jesus had many relatives named Matthew.

== The Tenth Ossuary ==
The authors present a case for the ossuary of James son of Joseph, brother of Jesus (Yakov ben Yosef akhui diYeshua). This controversial relic, accepted as legitimate by some, is believed by others in the field as fraudulent. Prominent among those who believe its authenticity is Hershel Shanks, editor of Biblical Archaeology Review. A forgery trial in Israel, instituted by the Israeli Antiquities Authority, failed to disprove its authenticity. The doubts are the result of the ossuary being unprovenanced – that is, not found in a legitimate excavation. The book presents what the authors purport to be firm scientific evidence that the James ossuary is the missing tenth ossuary from the Talpiot tomb.

The film makers from The Lost Tomb of Jesus had the outside layer of dirt tested against the other 9 ossuaries that were found in the tomb, and the dirt on the outside of the James ossuary was proven to be made up of the same minerals as the other 9 ossuaries. In the documentary they stated that this was nearly impossible if not from the same tomb.

However, Prof. Amos Kloner, who oversaw the archaeological work at Talpiot tomb, refutes the claim. According to Prof Kloner, the James Ossuary cannot be the missing 10th ossuary because the 10th ossuary had no inscription and had different dimensions. In fact, he has stated that the 10th ossuary was not missing at all.

== Criticism ==
Not only are the names on the bone boxes very common names of that time, but no writings of Jesus' life, canonical or apocryphal, reported a marriage or children; in fact, the idea that Jesus was married and/or had children has been rejected by the overwhelming majority of experts on the historical Jesus, including Bart D. Ehrman, John P. Meier, Géza Vermes, Raymond E. Brown, Maurice Casey and Jeffrey J. Kripal. Even the Jesus Seminar, who supports several heterodox views about the historical Jesus, states that there is no historical evidence of a marriage between Jesus and Mary Magdalene.

The gnostic apocryphal texts, which are often used to support the claim that Jesus had romantic relation with Mary Magdalene (Dialogue of the Saviour, Pistis Sophia, the Gospel of Thomas, the Gospel of Philip, the Gospel of Mary and the Acts of Philip) are all later works, cannot be considered as historical and, in any case, do not mention any romantic relation between Jesus and Mary Magdalene. The Gospel of Jesus's Wife, a supposed text mentioning Jesus's relationship with Mary Magdalene, was later found to be a modern forgery.

The authenticity of the nine remaining ossuaries is under no doubt, but the translation of the names on them is a subject of great controversy. The idea that the people in this tomb are Jesus of Nazareth and his supposed family has been rejected by the overwhelming majority of archeologists, theologians, linguistics and biblical scholars.

Recently, some of the scholars quoted in the Discovery Channel documentary have issued strong clarifications, backtracking on some of the central claims made in the film and book. Namely, University of Toronto statistician Professor Andrey Feuerverger, whose conservative statistical analysis claimed that the odds were 600:1 in favor of the tomb being the burial site of Jesus' family, has clarified his opinion, saying that these odds relate to the chances that these particular names would be found in one tomb, and not to the particular identification of individuals in the tomb. In a letter to the Society of Biblical Literature scholar François Bovon denounced that his comments were misused and that he never supported the idea that Mariamne is Mary Magdalene's name, and that he believes that he considers the idea of Jesus's marriage to Mary Magdalene as science fiction.

Israeli archaeologist Amos Kloner, who was among the first to examine the tomb when it was first discovered, said the names marked on the coffins were very common at the time: "I don't accept the news that it was used by Jesus or his family," he told BBC News "The documentary filmmakers are using it to sell their film."

Following a symposium at Princeton in January 2008 the media interest in the Talpiot tomb was reignited with most notably Time and CNN devoting extensive coverage, hailing the case as being re-opened. Following the media's portrayal scholars present at the symposium accused Simcha Jacobovici and James Cameron for misleading the media in claiming the symposium re-opened their theory as viable. Several scholars, including significantly several of the archaeologists and epigraphers, who had delivered papers at the symposium issued an open letter of complaint claiming misrepresentation, saying that Jacobovici and Cameron's claims of support from the symposium are "nothing further from the truth".

The list of scholars included:

- Professor Jodi Magness, University of North Carolina at Chapel Hill
- Professor Eric M. Meyers, Duke University
- Choon-Leon Seow, Princeton Theological Seminary
- F. W. Dobbs-Allsopp, Princeton Theological Seminary
- Lee McDonald, Princeton Theological Seminary, visiting
- Rachel Hachlili, University of Haifa
- Motti Aviam, University of Rochester
- Amos Kloner, Bar Ilan University
- Christopher Rollston, Emmanuel School of Religion
- Shimon Gibson, University of North Carolina at Charlotte
- Joe Zias, Science and Antiquity Group, Jerusalem
- Jonathan Price, Tel Aviv University
- C.D. Elledge, Gustavus Adolphus College

Professor Géza Vermes (a well-known scholar of the historical Jesus) dismissed Jocobovici's theories as "inconsistent and insignificant", while archaeologist William G. Dever called them "a publicity stunt". Writing in the Jesuit magazine America, Father Joseph Fitzmyer SJ (a well-known Catholic biblical scholar) dismissed the book's theories comparing it to The Da Vinci Code.
