= James Ossuary =

1st-century limestone box

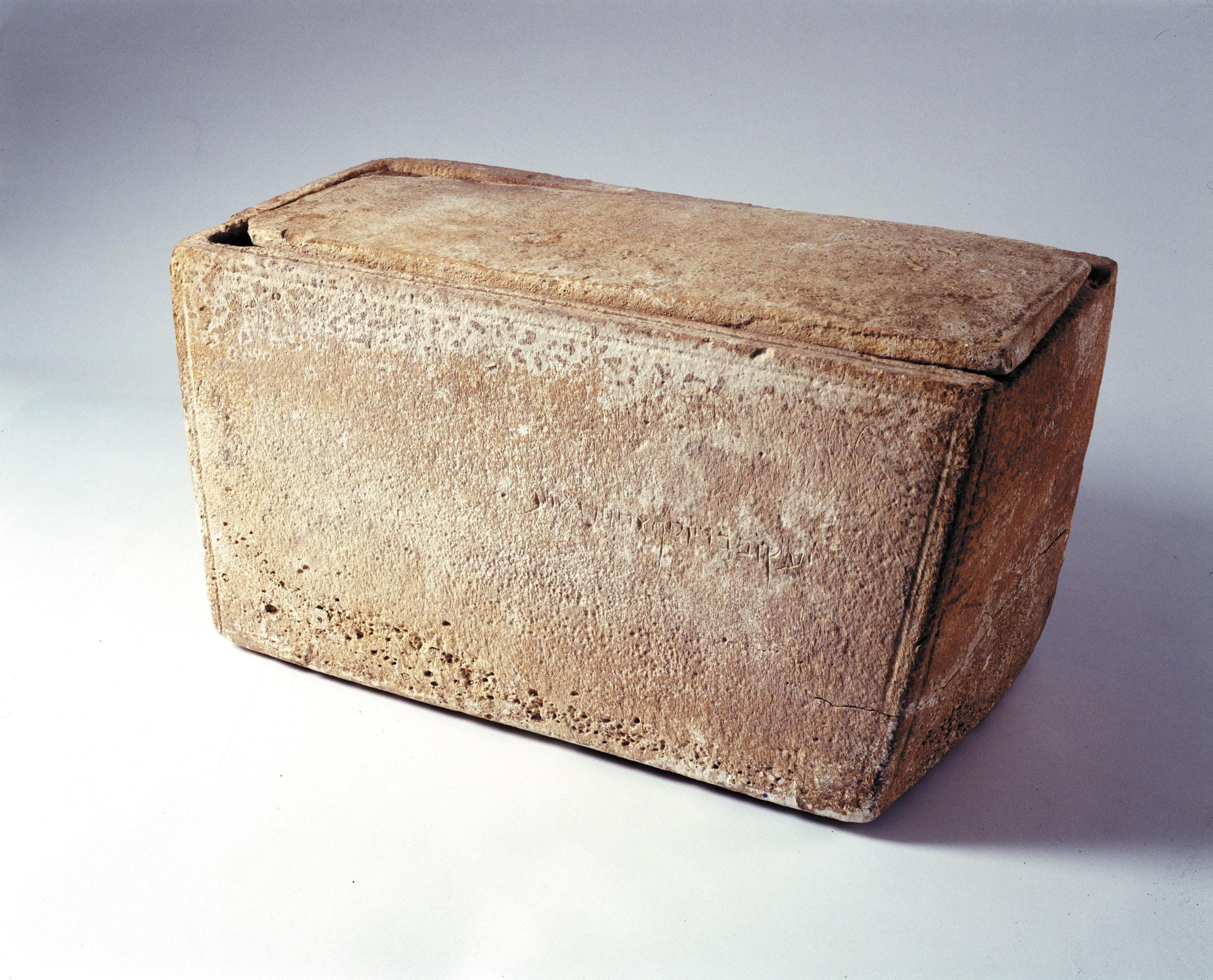
- The James Ossuary, a limestone bone box that is ostensibly from the 1st century CE.
- Material: Limestone
- Size: 50.5 cm × 25 cm × 30.5 cm (19.9 in × 9.8 in × 12.0 in)
- Writing: cursive Aramaic script
- Created: allegedly First century CE
- Discovered: the Silwan area of the Kidron Valley in Israel
- Present location: the collection of Oded Golan

The James Ossuary is a limestone box that is claimed to be from the 1st-century that was used for containing the bones of the dead (known as an ossuary). An Aramaic inscription carved into one side of the box reads, in translation, "James, son of Joseph, brother of Yeshua". The ossuary attracted scholarly attention due to its possible association with the Christian Holy Family, and has been the subject of continuing debate over its authenticity. It is owned by Israeli antiquities collector Oded Golan.

According to Golan, he bought it from an antiques dealer in the 1970s. In a trial that lasted from 2004 to 2012, Golan and others were tried for forging the inscription. Ultimately, the judge found that the evidence was insufficient to establish their guilt, while making it clear that the verdict did not prove or disprove the authenticity of the inscription.

== Text ==
Text	יעקוב בר יוסף אחוי דישוע
Transliteration	yʿqwb br ywsf ʾḥwy d yšwʿ
Romanization	Ya'akov bar-Yosef akhui diYeshua
Translation	Ya'akov son of Yosef, brother of Yeshua

== Significance ==
An ossuary is a stone (usually limestone) depository for storing bones of the dead, considered a luxury for the elite. The dead would lie on a loculus in a tomb for a year of decomposition, and then the remains would be collected and placed in an ossuary. Depending on the wealth and taste of the family, the box would sometimes be inscribed with decorations or the name of the deceased. The James Ossuary measures 50.5 by 25 by 30.5 centimetres (19.9 in × 9.8 in × 12.0 in), which is slightly smaller than average compared to other ossuaries of the time. Owner Oded Golan said that, if the inscription on the James Ossuary is genuine, it may indicate that the ossuary was that of James the Just, the brother of Jesus.

Professor Camil Fuchs of Tel Aviv University stated that, other than the James Ossuary, there has so far only been one found, amongst thousands of ossuaries, that contains a reference to a brother, concluding that "there is little doubt that this [naming a brother or son] was done only when there was a very meaningful reason to refer to a family member of the deceased, usually due to his importance and fame." He produced a statistical analysis of the occurrence of these three names in ancient Jerusalem and projected that there would only have been 1.71 people named James, with a father named Joseph and a brother named Jesus, expected to be living in Jerusalem around the time at which the ossuary was produced.

== Announcement and exhibition ==
The existence of the James Ossuary was announced at a press conference in Washington, D.C., on October 21, 2002. It was organized by Hershel Shanks, founder of the Biblical Archaeology Society. He presented it as the first direct archaeological link to the historical Jesus.

Shanks also announced that the ossuary would be featured at an exhibit at the Royal Ontario Museum in Toronto, Ontario, opening the following month. The opening was to coincide with meetings of scholarly groups such as the Society of Biblical Literature and American Academy of Religion that were to take place in the city in November.

== Scholarly analysis ==
The James Ossuary came from the Silwan area in the Kidron Valley, southeast of the Temple Mount. The bones originally inside the ossuary had been discarded, which is the case in nearly all ossuaries not discovered by archaeologists. The only time Jews conducted burials in this fashion of ossuary was from approximately 20 BC to the destruction of Jerusalem in 70 AD. The fragile condition of the ossuary attests to its antiquity. The Geological Survey of Israel submitted the ossuary to a variety of scientific tests, which determined that the limestone of the ossuary had a patina or sheen consistent with being in a cave for many centuries. The same type of patina covers the incised lettering of the inscription as the rest of the surface. It is claimed that, if the inscription were recent, this would not be the case.

Antiquities dealer Oded Golan invited Parisian epigrapher André Lemaire to view the ossuary in his apartment. According to Lemaire, the cursive Aramaic script is consistent with first-century lettering. He determined that the inscription was not incised with modern tools, as it contains no chemical elements not available in the ancient world. The first part of the inscription, "James son of Joseph", seems more deeply incised than the latter "brother of Jesus". This may be due to the inscription being made at a different time, or due to differences in the hardness of the limestone.

On June 18, 2003, the Israeli Antiquities Authority published a report, based on their analysis of the patina, which concluded that the inscription is a modern forgery. Specifically, it claimed that the inscription was added in modern times and made to look old by addition of a chalk solution. In 2006, Wolfgang Elisabeth Krumbein, a world-renowned expert in stone patinas, called by the defense counsel, analyzed the ossuary and concluded that "the inscription is ancient and most of the original patina has been removed (by cleaning or use of sharp implement)". He further noted in his report, "any forgery of three very distinct types of patina, if ever possible, requires the development of ultra-advanced techniques, in-depth knowledge and extensive collaboration of a large number of experts from various fields". According to his analysis, the patina inside the inscription took at least 50 years to form; thus, if it is a forgery, then it was forged more than 50 years ago.

In 2004, an analysis of the ossuary's petrography and oxygen isotopic composition was conducted by Avner Ayalon, Miryam Bar-Matthews and Yuval Goren. They compared the δ^{18}O values of the letters' patina from the James Ossuary with the patina sampled from the uninscribed surfaces of the same item ("surface patina"), and with the surface and letters' patinas from legally excavated ossuaries from Jerusalem. Their study undermined the authenticity claim of the ossuary. However, Dr James Harrell, professor of Archaeological Geology at the University of Toledo, provided an explanation for this δ^{18}O discrepancy. He suggested that a cleanser, which antiquities dealers and collectors often use to clean the artifacts to increase value, may have been the source of the low δ^{18}O readings. He tested the most popular cleanser sold in Israel and confirmed that the δ^{18}O value of the cleanser was consistent with the δ^{18}O value of the patina in the inscription.

A later study with a different isotope found that the δ^{13}C values of the surface patina and the inscription patina were almost identical. In 2007, Finnish theologian Matti Myllykoski (Arto Matti Tuomas Myllykoski) summarised the current position thus: "The authenticity and significance of the ossuary has been defended by Shanks (2003), while some scholars—relying on convincing evidence, to say the least—strongly suspect that it is a modern forgery." In 2013, an archaeometric analysis by Amnon Rosenfeld, Howard Randall Feldman and Wolfgang Elisabeth Krumbein strengthened the authenticity contention of the ossuary. It found that patina on the ossuary surface matched that in the engravings and that microfossils in the inscription seemed naturally deposited.

== Israeli investigation ==
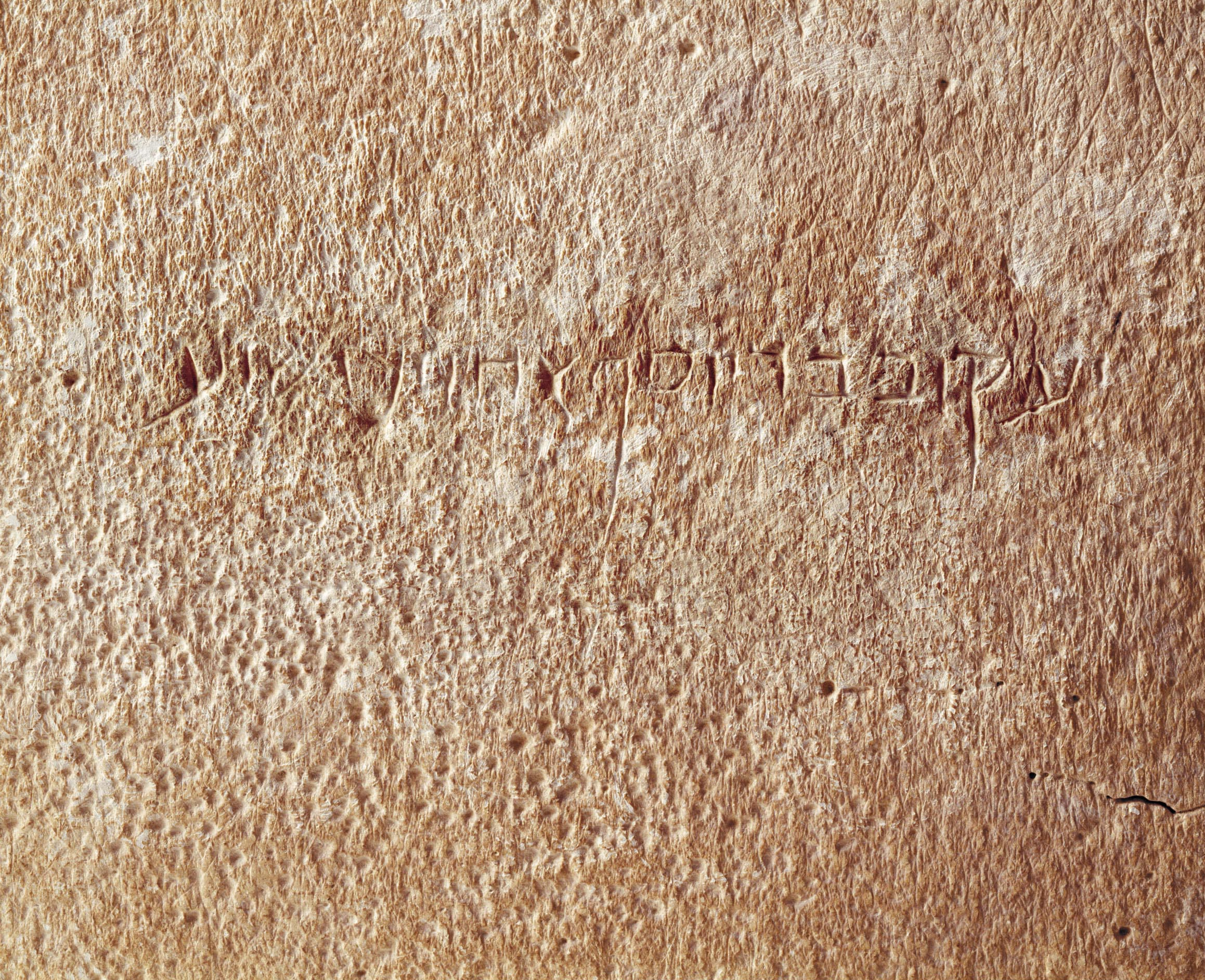
Close-up of the Aramaic inscription: "Ya'akov bar Yosef akhui di Yeshua" ("James, son of Joseph, brother of Jesus")

Limor Livnat, Israeli Minister of Culture, mandated the work of a scientific commission to study the suspicious finds. IAA began an investigation into the affair. The James Ossuary was authentic—albeit unusual in shape—but they concluded that the inscription was likely a forgery.

However, in an external expert report, dated September 2005, Wolfgang E. Krumbein concluded that "Our preliminary investigations cannot prove the authenticity of the three objects beyond any doubt. Doubtlessly the patina is continuous in many places throughout surface and lettering grooves in the case of ossuary and tablet. On the other hand a proof of forgery is not given by the experts nominated by the IAA."

The Biblical Archaeology Review continued to defend the ossuary. In articles in the February 2005 issues, several paleographic experts argue that the James Ossuary is authentic and should be examined by specialists outside of Israel. Another article claims the cleaning of the James Ossuary before it was examined may have caused the problem with the patina. On June 13, 2012, a Biblical Archaeology Review press release announced the first major post-trial analysis of the ossuary, discussing the plausibility of its authenticity, including a statistical analysis of ancient names, conducted by Professor Camil Fuchs of Tel Aviv University, suggesting that in contemporary Jerusalem, there would have been 1.71 people named James with both a father Joseph and a brother named Jesus.

== Trial of Oded Golan ==
Oded Golan claimed publicly to believe his finds were genuine. Hershel Shanks declared that he did not believe the evidence of forgery and launched a personal complaint against IAA director Shuka Dorfman. Lemaire supported his original assessment when Frank Cross regretted Shanks' attitude. The Royal Ontario Museum, in its statement about Oded Golan's arrest and the validity of the so-called James Ossuary stated, "There is always a question of authenticity when objects do not come from a controlled archaeological excavation, as is the case with the James Ossuary." However, the museum's decision to rush the ossuary into an exhibition was criticized by scholars. Eric M. Meyers called the ROM "reckless", and Joe Zias said, "They saw the opportunity to make a fast buck and they did it." The ROM rejected these criticisms, stating that it had conducted thorough examinations of the ossuary and consulted scientific experts prior to the exhibition. According to ROM senior curator Edward J. Keall, tests conducted by the museum supported the authenticity of both the ossuary and the inscription, concluding that the weathering was consistent across the surface.

The Israel Antiquities Authority wants to limit the trade in Bible-era artifacts, which they believe encourages grave robbers, who smuggle the choicest finds out of the country.

On December 29, 2004, the Israeli Justice Ministry charged Golan, three other Israelis, and one Palestinian, with running a forgery ring that had been operating for more than twenty years. Golan was indicted in an Israeli court along with his three co-defendants: Robert Deutsch, an epigraphy expert who has given lectures at the University of Haifa; collector Shlomo Cohen; and antiquities dealer Faiz al-Amaleh. They were accused of manufacturing numerous artifacts, including an Ivory pomegranate which had previously been generally accepted as the only proven relic from the Temple of King Solomon. Golan denied the charges.

In February 2007, at Golan's trial, the defense produced photographs taken in Golan's home that were dated to 1976. In these photographs, the ossuary is shown on a shelf. In an enlargement, the whole inscription can be seen. The photographs were printed on 1970s photographic paper and stamped March 1976. The photo was examined by Gerald Richard, a former FBI agent and an expert for the defense. Richard testified that nothing about the photographs suggested that they were produced other than in 1976 as the stamps and paper indicated. These photographs undermined the prosecution's theory that the ossuary was a recent forgery by Golan intended to be sold for profit. Golan's attorney, Lior Beringer argued, "The prosecution claims that Golan forged the inscription after the beginning of 2000, however, there is a detailed report from an FBI photo lab that states that the inscription existed at least since the 70s. It is unreasonable that someone would forge an inscription like this in the 70s and suddenly decide to come out with it in 2002." However, it would also be necessary for some time to pass for a forgery to acquire the characteristics of an authentic patina. Later under oath, the government's chief scientific witness, Professor Yuval Goren of Tel Aviv University admitted on cross-examination that there was original ancient patina in the word "Jesus."

Two paleographers, André Lemaire of the Sorbonne and Ada Yardeni of the Hebrew University of Jerusalem, pronounced it as authentic in the trial. No paleographer of repute has challenged their analysis. In fact, Yardeni, who is considered an expert in the field, testified that the inscription is no doubt of ancient origin inscribed by a single individual, and stated, "If this is a forgery, I quit." By 2009, many of the world's top archaeological experts had testified for both the prosecution and defense. Judge Aharon Farkash, who has a degree in archaeology, indicated difficulty in making a judgment regarding the objects' authenticity if the professors could not agree amongst themselves. In the second week of October 2010, Farkash retired to consider his verdict. Non-Semitic Epigrapher Rochelle Altman, has repeatedly called the second half of the inscription a forgery. However, the court determined that her opinion lacked evidentiary basis.

On March 14, 2012, Farkash stated "that there is no evidence that any of the major artifacts were forged [by Golan], and the prosecution failed to prove their accusations beyond a reasonable doubt". He was particularly scathing about tests carried out by the Israel police forensics laboratory that he said had probably contaminated the ossuary, making it impossible to carry out further scientific tests on the inscription. However, the judge explicitly declined to rule on the authenticity of the objects, underlining that the acquittal "does not mean that the inscription on the ossuary is authentic or that it was written 2,000 years ago" and that “[T]here is nothing in these findings which necessarily proves that the items were authentic”.

On May 30, 2012, Oded Golan was fined 30,000 shekels and sentenced to one month in jail for minor non-forgery charges related to the trial. As he had already served time incarcerated at the start of the case, he did not have to serve any further time in prison.

Following Golan's acquittal, the Israeli Antiquities Authority released a statement in which, while respecting the court's verdict, it also underlined that "the court had to decide professional issues in the field of archaeology, which are not frequently heard in a court of law. Because a person’s guilt must be proved beyond a reasonable doubt in a criminal trial, Golan was acquitted. However, the judge did emphasize that it was not possible to determine that the finds presented in the trial – including the ossuary and the 'Jehoash inscription' – are not forgeries."

== Discovery Channel documentaries ==
On February 26, 2007, a news conference was held at the New York Public Library by director James Cameron and Simcha Jacobovici to discuss their documentary The Lost Tomb of Jesus, which discusses the 1980 finding of the Talpiot Tomb, which they claim is in fact Jesus' family tomb. In the film, they also suggest that the so-called James ossuary is actually the "missing link" from the tomb. At the original discovery of the Talpiot Tomb, there were ten ossuaries, but one has since been lost. Jacobovici suggests the James Ossuary could be the missing one. According to the film, "recent tests conducted at the CSI Suffolk Crime lab in New York demonstrate that the patina (a chemical film encrustation on the box) from the James ossuary matches the patina from the other ossuaries in the Talpiot tomb."

Early Christianity scholar R. Joseph Hoffmann, chair of the Committee for the Scientific Examination of Religion charges that the film "is all about bad assumptions," beginning with the assumption that the boxes contain Jesus of Nazareth and his family. From his view as a historian specializing in the social history of earliest Christianity, he found it "amazing how evidence falls into place when you begin with the conclusion—and a hammer."

When interviewed about the upcoming documentary, Amos Kloner, who oversaw the original archaeological dig of this tomb in 1980 said:

"It makes a great story for a TV film, but it's completely impossible. It's nonsense."

Newsweek reported that the archaeologist who personally numbered the ossuaries dismissed any potential connection:

"Simcha [Jacobovici] has no credibility whatsoever," says Joe Zias, who was the curator for anthropology and archeology at the Rockefeller Museum in Jerusalem from 1972 to 1997 and personally numbered the Talpiot ossuaries. "He's pimping off the Bible … He got this guy Cameron, who made Titanic or something like that—what does this guy know about archeology? I am an archeologist, but if I were to write a book about brain surgery, you would say, 'Who is this guy?' People want signs and wonders. Projects like these make a mockery of the archeological profession."

Pfann also thinks the inscription read as "Jesus" has been misread and suggests that the name "Hanun" might be a more accurate rendering.

The Washington Post reported that William G. Dever (mentioned above as excavating ancient sites in Israel for 50 years) offered the following:

"I've known about these ossuaries for many years and so have many other archaeologists, and none of us thought it was much of a story, because these are rather common Jewish names from that period. It's a publicity stunt, and it will make these guys very rich, and it will upset millions of innocent people because they don't know enough to separate fact from fiction."

Ben Witherington III of Asbury Theological Seminary pointed out some other circumstantial problems with linking this tomb to Jesus' family:

- "So far as we can tell, the earliest followers of Jesus never called Jesus 'son of Joseph'. It was outsiders who mistakenly called him that."
- "The ancestral home of Joseph was Bethlehem, and his adult home was Nazareth. The family was still in Nazareth after he [Joseph] was apparently dead and gone. Why in the world would he be buried (alone at this point) in Jerusalem?"
- "One of the ossuaries has the name Jude son of Jesus. We have no historical evidence of such a son of Jesus, indeed we have no historical evidence he was ever married."
- "The Mary ossuaries (there are two) do not mention anyone from Migdal. It simply has the name Mary—and that's about the most common of all ancient Jewish female names."
- "We have names like Matthew on another ossuary, which don't match up with the list of [Jesus's] brothers' names."

The Archaeological Institute of America has published online their own criticism of the "Jesus tomb" claim:

"The identification of the Talpiyot tomb as the tomb of Jesus and his family is based on a string of problematic and unsubstantiated claims [...] [It] contradicts the canonical Gospel accounts of the death and burial of Jesus and the earliest Christian traditions about Jesus. This claim is also inconsistent with all of the available information—historical and archaeological—about how Jews in the time of Jesus buried their dead, and specifically the evidence we have about poor, non-Judean families like that of Jesus. It is a sensationalistic claim without any scientific basis or support."

Lawrence E. Stager, the Dorot professor of archaeology of Israel at Harvard, said the documentary was "exploiting the whole trend that caught on with The Da Vinci Code. One of the problems is there are so many biblically illiterate people around the world that they don't know what is real judicious assessment and what is what some of us in the field call 'fantastic archaeology.'"

During Ted Koppel's critique, The Lost Tomb of Jesus: A Critical Look, Koppel stated he had denials from three people whom Simcha Jacobovici had misquoted in the documentary.

1. Koppel had a written denial from the forensic archaeologist asserting that he had not concluded that the remains of Jesus and Miriamne showed they were husband and wife.
2. Koppel had a written denial from the Suffolk Crime Lab Director asserting that he had not stated the James ossuary patina "matched" that of the Jesus ossuary.
3. Koppel had a verbal denial from Professor Amos Kloner, the archaeologist who had supervised the initial 1980 dig of the tomb, with whom he spoke on March 4, 2007, asserting that the ossuary that later turned up missing from the tomb could not have been what is now known as the James ossuary because the ossuary he had seen and photographed and catalogued in 1980 had been totally unmarked, whereas the James ossuary is marked with the name of James and a rosette.

== See also ==
- Jehoash Inscription
- Biblical archaeology
- List of artifacts significant to the Bible
- Archaeological forgery
- The Jesus Family Tomb
