= Talpiot Tomb =

Rock-cut tomb in Old City Jerusalem

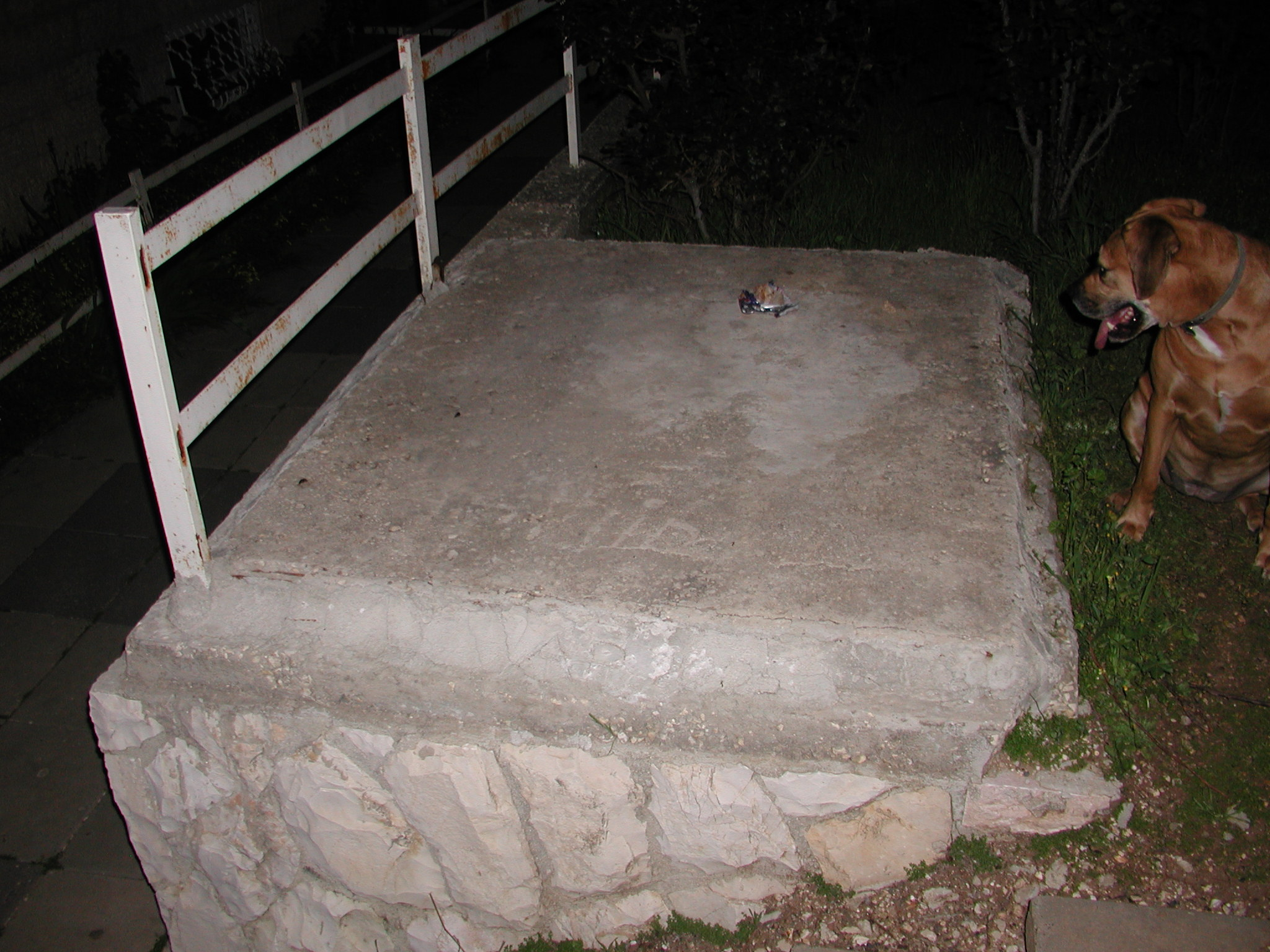
- Sealed tomb in Talpiot
- Interactive map of Talpiot Tomb
- 31.751402°N 35.235198°E
- Type: Burial tomb
- Location: Talpiot, Jerusalem

History
- Built: Second Temple period

Site notes
- Discovered: 1980
- Management: Israel Antiquities Authority
- Public access: No

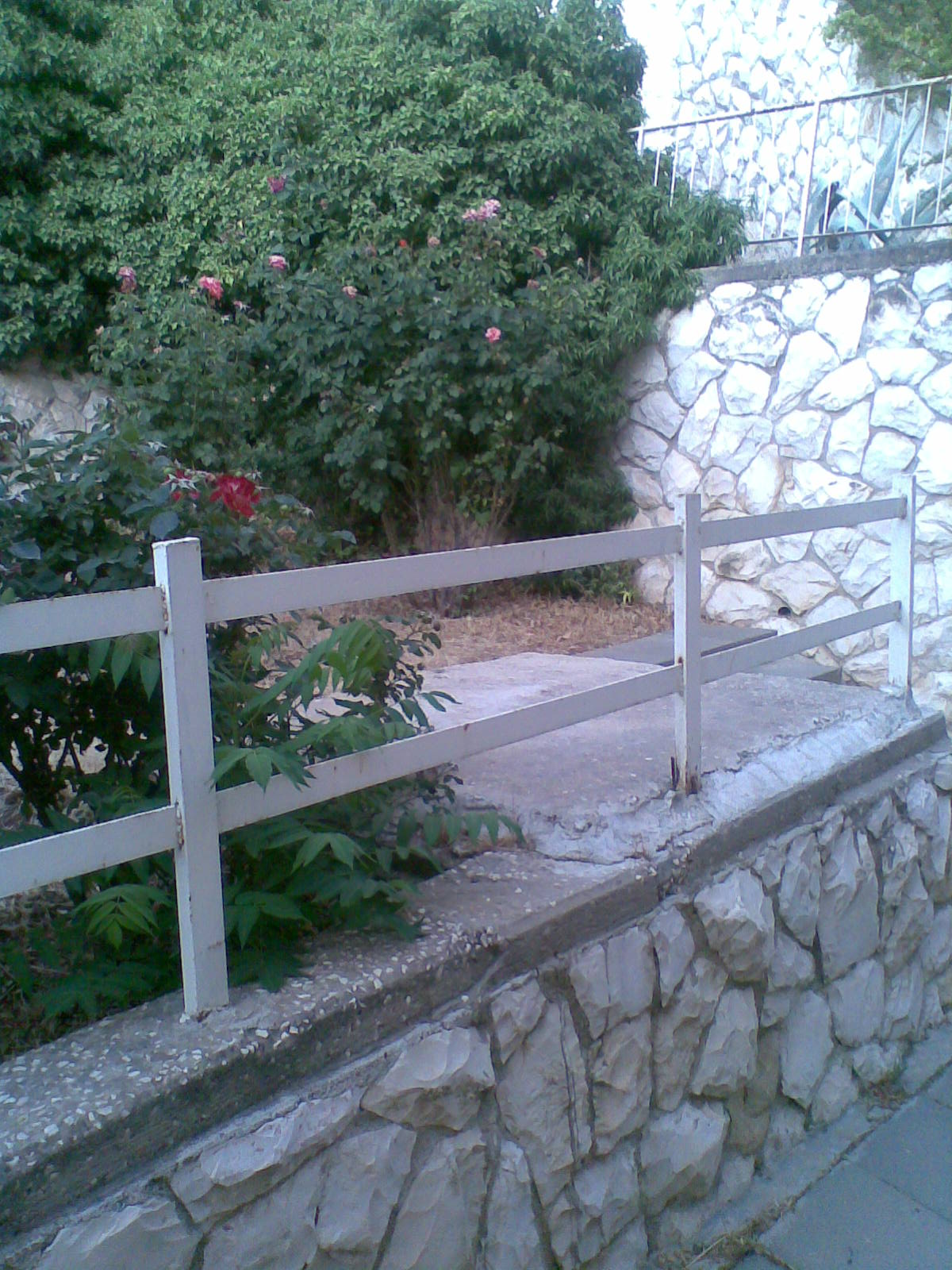
A concrete slab covers the tomb

The Talpiot Tomb (or Talpiyot Tomb) is a rock-cut tomb discovered in 1980 in the East Talpiot neighborhood, five kilometers (three miles) south of the Old City in East Jerusalem. It contained ten ossuaries, six inscribed with epigraphs, including one interpreted as Yeshua bar Yehosef ("Jeshua, son of Joseph"), though the inscription is partially illegible, and its translation and interpretation is widely disputed. The tomb also yielded various human remains and several carvings.

The Talpiot discovery was documented in 1994 in "Catalogue of Jewish Ossuaries in the Collections of the State of Israel" numbers 701–709, and first discussed in the media in the United Kingdom during March/April 1996. Later that year, an article describing the find was published in volume 29 of Atiqot, the journal of the Israel Antiquities Authority.

A controversial documentary film, The Lost Tomb of Jesus, was produced in 2007 by director James Cameron and journalist Simcha Jacobovici, and was released in conjunction with a book by Jacobovici and Charles R. Pellegrino titled The Jesus Family Tomb. The book and film make the case that the Talpiot Tomb was the burial place of Jesus of Nazareth, members of his extended family, and several other figures from the New Testament—and, by inference, that Jesus had not risen from the dead as the New Testament describes. This conclusion, while weakly supported by a statistical analysis of the names involved, is rejected by the overwhelming majority of archaeologists, Christian theologians, linguists, and biblical scholars.

== History ==
The archaeological team that excavated the tomb in 1980 determined it to be from the Second Temple period, which lasted from about 515 BCE to 70 CE. Typical of the area, a tomb of this type would be assumed to have belonged to a wealthy Jewish family. About 900 similar tombs have been unearthed in the same area.

== Discovery and excavation ==
The tomb was discovered on March 28, 1980, by construction workers laying the foundations for an apartment complex, when preparatory demolition work accidentally uncovered the tomb's entrance. The site was visited the next day by Amos Kloner, the area supervisor for the Israel Department of Antiquities (IDA, now the Israel Antiquities Authority, or IAA.) Kloner drew up a set of preliminary sketches and requested a permit for a salvage dig to be directed by Yosef Gat. The permit was issued Monday, March 31, but work actually began the day before. Although it has been said that the team was given only three days to complete the work, Gat's notes indicate that the work proceeded "intermittently" until its official end on April 11, with most of the work completed within the first two days.

Construction of the apartment buildings was completed in 1982. The children of Tova Bracha, a local resident, managed to get into the tomb and play inside. Bracha notified the authorities, who sealed the entrance for safety reasons. The children found some discarded Jewish religious texts that had been placed in the tomb, which was being used as a genizah.

The tomb, which is not open to the public, is located in a courtyard on Dov Gruner Street, down a flight of stairs at the corner of Olei Hagardom and Avshalom Haviv Streets. It was reopened in 2005 by Jacobovici, without permission from the Antiques Authority, during filming of his documentary The Lost Tomb of Jesus, and resealed by officials shortly thereafter. In 2008, Ruth Gat, the widow of the archaeologist who supervised the original excavation, claimed that her husband kept the discovery a secret until the mid-1990s because he feared a wave of antisemitism would ensue if the tomb's existence was made public. However, such claims have been rejected by scholars, who pointed out that Yosef Gat died well before the inscriptions in the tomb were deciphered and translated and, in any case, he lacked the expertise to read the inscriptions.

== Layout ==
The tomb is carved from the solid limestone bedrock. Within are six kokhim, or burial shafts and two arcosolia, or arched shelves where a body could be laid out for entombment. The ossuaries were found within the shafts.

== Artifacts ==
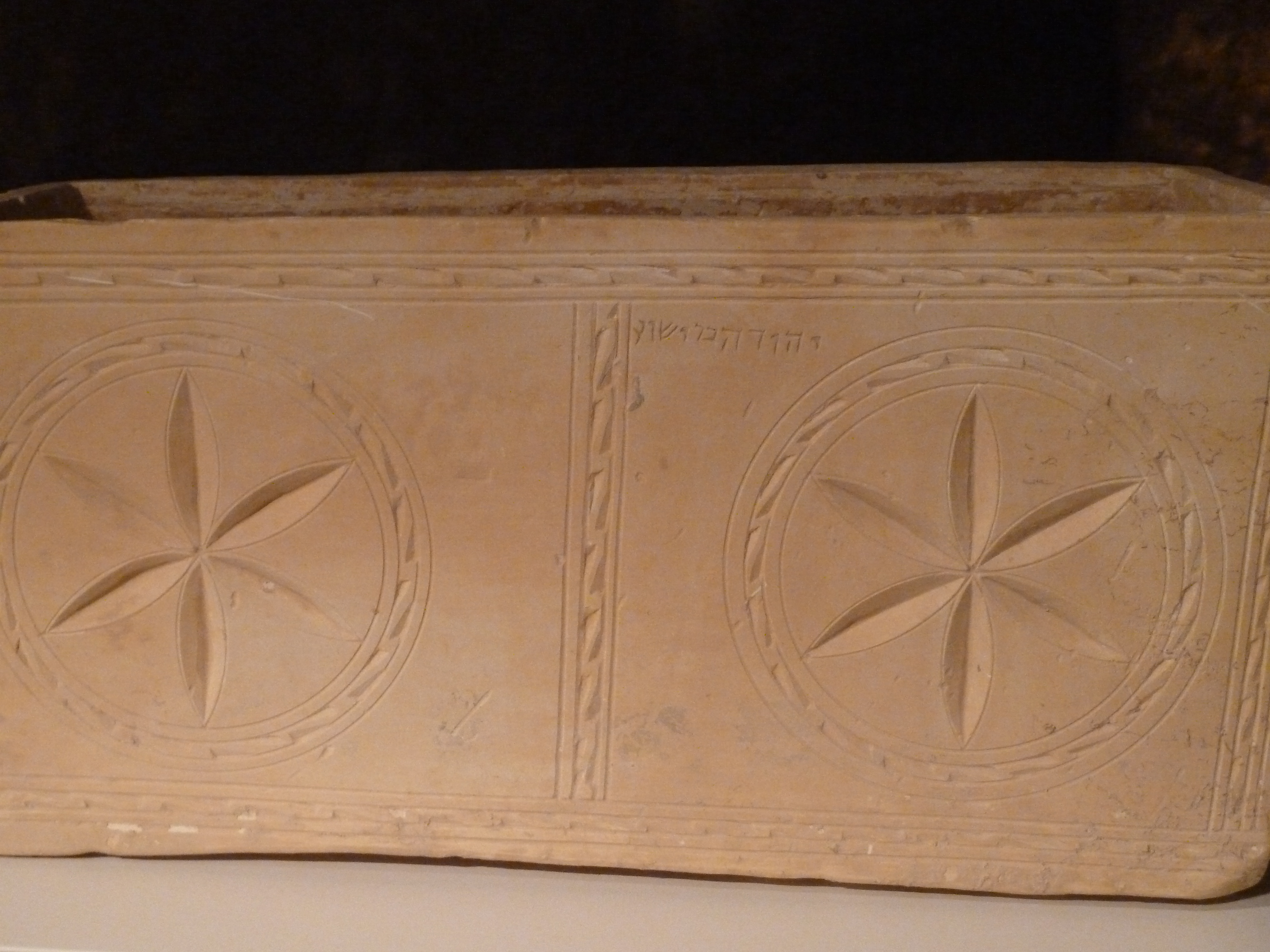
Ossuary of Judah son of Jesus. The Israel Museum, Jerusalem.

=== Ossuaries ===
Ten limestone ossuaries were found, with six of them bearing epigraphs although only four of them were recognized as such in the field. The archaeological team determined the ossuaries to be of little note, and delivered them to the Rockefeller Museum for analysis and storage. According to Jacobovici, Cameron, and religious studies professor James Tabor, one of the unmarked ossuaries later disappeared when it was stored in a courtyard outside the museum. This claim has been criticized by both Joe Zias, former curator of the museum, and Kloner.

Each of the ten ossuaries contained human remains, said to be in an "advanced state of deterioration" by Amos Kloner. The tomb may have been multi-generational, with several generations of bones stored in each ossuary, but no record was kept of their contents, and no analysis appears to have been done to determine how many individuals were represented by the bones found. In addition, three skulls were found on the floor of the tomb below the 0.5 metres (1.6 ft) fill layer, and crushed bones were found in the fill upon the arcosolia. The scattering of these bones below the fill indicated that the tomb had been disturbed in antiquity. All the bones were eventually turned over to religious authorities for burial.

=== Symbols ===
A chevron and circle pattern is visible above the entrance of the tomb.

== Media coverage ==
The BBC first aired a documentary on the Talpiot Tomb in 1996 as part of its Heart of the Matter news magazine. At that time, Amos Kloner, the first archaeologist to examine the site, said the claims of a connection to Jesus did not hold up archaeologically ("They just want to get money for it"), and others were similarly skeptical.

=== 2008 Princeton Symposium ===
Following a symposium ("Third Princeton Theological Seminary Symposium on Jewish Views of the Afterlife and Burial Practices in Second Temple Judaism: Evaluating the Talpiot Tomb in Context") held in Jerusalem in January 2008, the media interest in the Talpiot tomb was reignited with most notably Time and CNN devoting extensive coverage, hailing the case as being reopened. In particular Simcha Jacobovici is reported to have issued statements to the press saying the symposium has reopened the case and that he felt "totally vindicated". Jacobovici denied making any such press release. It was during this symposium that Ruth Gat, while accepting a posthumous award for Yosef Gat, announced: "My husband, the lead archaeologist of the East Talpiot tomb in southern Jerusalem, believed that the tomb he excavated in 1980 was, indeed, the tomb of Jesus of Nazareth and his family." Scholars in the seminary underlined that Yosef Gath had died well before the inscriptions in the tomb were deciphered and translated and therefore could not have known of any connection of the tomb. Amos Kloner, who had worked with Gath in the tomb, also denied that Gath had ever said anything like that, and accused Jacobovici of influencing Ruth Gath's opinion.

Following the media's portrayal, scholars present at the symposium accused Simcha Jacobovici and James Cameron of misleading the media in claiming that the symposium reopened their theory as viable. Several scholars, including significantly all of the archaeologists and epigraphers, who had delivered papers at the symposium issued an open letter of complaint claiming misrepresentation, saying that Jacobovici and Cameron's claims of support from the symposium are "nothing further from the truth" and also "that the majority of scholars in attendance—including all of the archaeologists and epigraphers who presented papers relating to the tomb—either reject the identification of the Talpiot tomb as belonging to Jesus’ family or find this claim highly speculative" and that "the probability of the Talpiot tomb belonging to Jesus’ family is virtually nil". Joe Zias, Senior Curator of Archaeology/Anthropology for the Israel Antiquities Authority 1972–1997, cited a leaked memo, which was issued from James Tabor before the symposium as proof of "outside intervention by Simcha and Tabor in order to distort the agenda and skew the proceedings in a way that was favorable to their pre-conceived plan".

Géza Vermes (a major and well-respected scholar on the historical Jesus) issued a statement saying that ”The evidence so far advanced falls far short of proving that the Talpiot tomb is, or even could be, the tomb of the family of Jesus of Nazareth. The identification of the ossuary of Mariamne with that of Mary Magdalene of the Gospels has no support whatever and without it the case collapses. The conference, primarily devoted to the problem of afterlife in Second Temple Judaism, was useful in airing the latest views on ancient Jewish burial practices and modern science. Apart from a handful of participants, the large majority of the assembled scholars consider the theory that the Talpiot ossuaries contained the remains of Jesus of Nazareth and his family as unlikely after the conference as it has been before. In my historical judgment, the matter is, and in the absence of substantial new evidence, should remain closed". Princeton Theological Seminary issued a letter following the controversy and reiterated concerns:

the press following the symposium gave almost the exact opposite impression (of the symposium's results), stating, instead, that the conference proceedings gave credence to the identification of the Talpiot tomb with a putative family tomb of Jesus of Nazareth. As is abundantly clear from the statements to the contrary that have been issued since the symposium by many of the participants, such representations are patently false and blatantly misrepresent the spirit and scholarly content of the deliberations.

The proceedings of the symposium were edited by James Charlesworth and published in 2013. At the end of the symposium, Charlesworth stated: "Most archaeologists, epigraphers, and other scientists argued persuasively that there is no reason to conclude that the Talpiot Tomb was Jesus' tomb." An edition of the scientific journal Near Eastern Archaeology (Vol. 69, Iss. 3/4, September–December 2006), published by The American Schools of Oriental Research contains several articles concerning the Talpiot Tomb, including an overview over the controversy. In a debate with The Dallas Morning News evangelical scholar Darrell L. Bock (Dallas Theological Seminary) and agnostic scholar Bart D. Ehrman (University of North Carolina at Chapel Hill) both concluded that the Talpiot Tomb has no connection whatsoever with the historical Jesus.

=== The Lost Tomb of Jesus and The Jesus Family Tomb ===
The Lost Tomb of Jesus premiered on The Discovery Channel on March 4, 2007, timed to coordinate with publication of Jacobovici's book The Jesus Family Tomb. Jacobovici argues that the bones of Jesus, Mary and Mary Magdalene, along with those of some of their relatives, were once entombed in this cave, working with statisticians, archaeologists, historians, DNA experts, robot-camera technicians, epigraphers and a forensic expert to argue his case. Israeli archaeologist Amos Kloner, who was among the first to examine the tomb when it was first discovered, said the names marked on the coffins were very common at the time. He told BBC News that "I don't accept the news that it was used by Jesus or his family" and added: "The documentary filmmakers are using it to sell their film." In 2010, Tabor and Jacobovici examined (although without fully excavating) the previously unexcavated 1st-century Jewish tomb next to the tomb. Tabor indicated that they would be released at a press conference in November 2011, and in a forthcoming book.

== Statistical analysis ==
A central question has regarded the probability that a tomb might contain the specific group of names as the Talpiot Tomb. Experts such as Richard Bauckham, David Mavorah and Amos Kloner have asserted the commonness of archaeological inscriptions bearing the name "Jesus". Paul Maier, professor of Ancient History at Western Michigan University, notes that there were at least 21 "Yeshuas" or Jesuses famous enough to be included in the histories of Josephus. For their part, the filmmakers present a statistical study conducted by Andrey Feuerverger, professor of statistics and mathematics at the University of Toronto, which concluded that while the names are not uncommon, the conservative odds that such names would be found together in any one tomb around are (depending on variables) from 600 to 1 to 1,000,000 to 1 in favor of its being authentic.

Later in 2013, Feuerverger concluded that the possibility that the Talpiot tomb (Tomb 1) belongs to a family with some connection to the New Testament is one that should be seriously considered. He stated as follows: "The author is of the opinion that, based on the currently available data, it is at least a possibility—and one that should be considered seriously—that Tomb 1 is that of a family related to the New Testament. This statement—not more, but also not less—stands as the author's own conclusion to the work presented here. We must leave it to others, who may be interested, to add to any discussions about the relevance of statistical ideas in assessing data of this nature." Feuerverger's assessment was based on several assumptions:

- That the Maria on one of the ossuaries is the mother of the Jesus found on another box
- That Mariamne is his wife
- That Joseph (inscribed as the nickname Jose) is his brother

Support for these assumptions comes, according to the documentary, from the following claims:

- Mariamne is the Greek form of Marya and, according to François Bovon, the name describes Mary Magdelene in the Acts of Philip, though this is speculation
- Mary Magdelene is believed to have spoken and preached in Greek
- Jose was the nickname used for Jesus' little brother
- The Talpiot Tomb is the only place where ossuaries have ever been found with the names Mariamne and Jose, even though the root forms of the name were very popular and thousands of ossuaries have been unearthed.

Further information regarding the methodology was published in The Annals of Applied Statistics. According to geologist Aryeh Shimron the tomb could be authentic and linked to the James Ossuary. He believes that the tomb is the tomb of the family of Jesus – Jesus, Mary Magdalene and their son Judah. Amos Kloner, who oversaw the archaeological work at Talpiot tomb, disagrees. According to Kloner, the James Ossuary could not have come from the Talpiot tomb, because the so-called missing ossuary of the Talpiot tomb had no inscription and was of different dimensions. On February 25, 2007, Feuerverger conducted a statistical calculation on the name cluster as part of The Lost Tomb of Jesus. He concluded that the odds are at least 600 to 1 that the combination of names appeared in the tomb by chance. A summary can be found on the Discovery Channel, as well as on documentary websites. A more detailed explanation of the statistical approach can be found also on Feuerverger's website, as well as in an interview given to Scientific American. The frequency distribution for names prevalent during the period of time during which ossuary burials took place was inferred by studying two key sources:

- Rahmani's Catalogue of Jewish Ossuaries in the Collections of the State of Israel'
- Tal Ilan's Lexicon of Jewish Names in Late Antiquity'

According to Feuerverger, the goal of the statistical analysis is to assess the probability level of a null hypothesis:

A 'null hypothesis' can be thought of here as asserting that this cluster of names arose purely by chance under random sampling from the onomasticon. The alternative hypothesis is the opposite of this, in some sense. It is not in the purview of statistics to conclude whether or not this tombsite is that of the New Testament family.

Feuerverger multiplied the instances that each name appeared during the tomb's time period with the instances of every other name. He initially found "Jesus Son of Joseph" appeared once out of 190 times, Mariamne appeared once out of 160 times and so on:

Jesus son of Joseph	Mariamne	Yosah	Maria	Product
1/190	1/160	1/20	1/4	1/2,432,000
0.53%	0.625%	5%	25%	~4.11X10^{−7}%

Feuerverger next divided 2,432,000 by 4 to account for bias in the historical record and further divided that result (608,000) by 1,000 to attempt to account for the number of explored tombs from first century Jerusalem. His conclusions have been called into question:

- According to some, multiplying the individual name probabilities is wrong because many permutations of the same names are possible.
- The inclusion of Mariamne in the calculation is based on two assumptions:
  - Mary Magdelene in New Testament (NT) was Jesus' wife.
  - Mariamne was the same person as Mary Magdalene, even though "Magdalene" does not appear in the inscription.
- The calculation adjusts only for the 1,000 tombs found in Jerusalem instead of the whole Jewish populace that lived in the area. This effectively assumes that Jesus family in NT did indeed have a family tomb and it was among the 1000 tombs found in Jerusalem area. There is no historical evidence for this assumption. Some experts, including archaeologist Amos Kloner (the one who excavated the tombs) do not accept that the poor family from Nazareth had a family tomb in Jerusalem.
- The inscription "Judah son of Jesus" is ignored in the calculation. Since most scholars considers the historical Jesus to be childless, some people believe this inscription should be included in the calculation to reduce the probability that the tomb belongs to the Jesus family.

Stephan Pfann, president of Jerusalem's University of the Holy Land, points out that the commonality of these names suggests that the probability is much lower. "Remarkably, a mere 16 of the 72 personal names [found on ossuaries] account for 75% of the inscribed names." Among these "top 16" names are Mary, Joseph, Jesus, Matthew, and Judas, and variations thereof. Between the submission of Feuerverger's paper to a journal and its publication, François Bovon noted that he had not made the statement about the name Mariamne which had been ascribed to him by Jacobovici and conveyed to Feuerverger. Specifically, although Feuerverger had factored into his calculations the understanding that Bovon had identified Mariamne as the most likely name of Mary Magdalene, Bovon did not hold that belief. Feuerverger noted in his rejoinder to comments that this false understanding so perturbed his calculation that "this means that we cannot (on the basis of our RR procedure) say that the Talpiyot find is statistically significant in any meaningful way." Richard Bauckham (Professor of New Testament Studies and Bishop Wardlaw Professor at University of St Andrews) compiled the following data to show just how common the names on these ossuaries are:

Out of a total number of 2625 males, these are the figures for the ten most popular male names among Palestinian Jews. The first figure is the total number of occurrences (from this number, with 2625 as the total for all names, you could calculate percentages), while the second is the number of occurrences specifically on ossuaries.

Rank	Name	Total references	Found on ossuaries	Percent of total references (2625)
1	Simon/Simeon	243	59	9.3%
2	Joseph	218	45	8.3%
3	Eleazar	166	29	6.3%
4	Judah	164	44	6.2%
5	John/Yohanan	122	25	4.6%
6	Jesus	99	22	3.8%
7	Hananiah	82	18	3.1%
8	Jonathan	71	14	2.7%
9	Matthew	62	17	2.4%
10	Manaen/Menahem	42	4	1.6%

For women, there are a total of 328 occurrences (women's names are much less often recorded than men's), and figures for the four most popular names are thus:

Rank	Name	Total references	Found on ossuaries	Percent of total references (328)
1	Mary/Mariamne	70	42	21.3%
2	Salome	58	41	17.7%
3	Shelamzion	24	19	7.3%
4	Martha	20	17	6.1%

Colin Aitken, a professor of Forensic Statistics at University of Edinburgh, stated that the study is based on a number of assumptions, and that, "even if we accept the assumptions, 600 to one is certainly not the odds in favour of this tomb being Jesus'", meaning that even if it were true that to find this cluster of names is very unlikely, it does not follow that therefore this is probably the tomb of the family of Jesus. Peter Lampe, professor of New Testament Studies at the Heidelberg University and working in archaeology, pointed out that in the 120s/130s CE in the port town of Maoza at the southern end of the Dead Sea, one Jewish household comprised the following names: Jesus, Simon, Mariame, Jacobus and Judah (Papyri Babatha 17 from 128 CE; 25–26 and 34 from 131 CE). These people had nothing to do with the New Testament or the Talpiyot tomb. According to the rationale of the filmmakers, these people "should not have existed".

== See also ==
- Rock-cut tombs in ancient Israel
- James Ossuary
