= Jehohanan =

Man crucified in 1st century CE Judaea

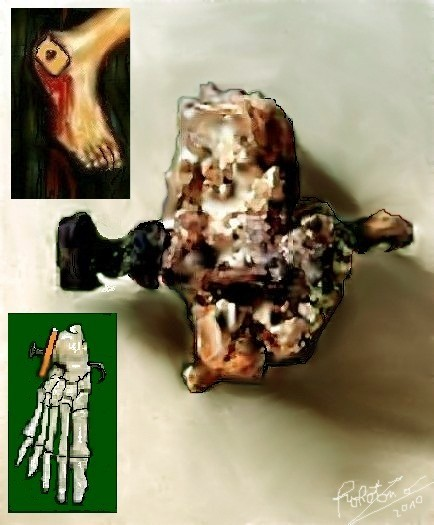
Jehohanan's heel bone.

Jehohanan (Hebrew: יהוחנן, romanized: Yəhōḥānān) was a Judean man sentenced to death by crucifixion sometime in the 1st century AD. His ossuary was found in 1968 when building contractors working in Giv'at ha-Mivtar accidentally uncovered a Jewish tomb. The stone ossuary had the Hebrew inscription of "Jehohanan the son of Hagkol" (Hebrew: יהוחנן בן הגקול, romanized: Yehoḥanan ben Hagqol; the meaning of hgqwl is uncertain, hence his name sometimes being given as Johanan ben Ha-galgula).

In his initial anthropological observations in 1970 at the Hebrew University of Jerusalem, Nicu Haas concluded that Jehohanan was crucified with his arms stretched out and his forearms nailed, possibly on a two-beamed cross. However, a 1985 reappraisal by Joseph Zias and Eliezer Sekeles of the Hebrew University found multiple errors in these observations. Zias and Sekeles proposed that a horizontal beam was affixed to vertical stakes, with Jehohanan's arms tied and death occurring from asphyxiation.

== Anthropological observations ==
=== Initial observations, Haas, 1970 ===
In his article "Anthropological Observations on the Skeletal Remains from Giv'at ha-Mivtar" published in the Israel Exploration Journal in 1970, Nicu Haas of the Department of Anatomy at Hebrew University, wrote of the remains of a man crucified:

The whole of our interpretation concerning the position of the body on the cross may be described briefly as follows: The feet were joined almost parallel, both transfixed by the same nail at the heels, with the legs adjacent; the knees were doubled, the right one overlapping the left; the trunk was contorted; the upper limbs were stretched out, each stabbed by a nail in the forearm."

— Israel Exploration Journal, Vol-20, 1970

Haas was unable to examine the remains any further because of serious health problems, and while his conclusions became widely accepted by the general public, several errors in his observations were later identified by Joseph Zias and Dr. Eliezer Sekeles of the Hebrew University in their 1985 reappraisal.

=== Reappraisal, Zias & Sekeles, 1985 ===
In 1985, Joe Zias, curator of the Israel Department of Antiquities and Museums, and Eliezer Sekeles, from the Hadassah Medical Center, re-examined the crucifixion remains. They alleged that Haas' analysis was fraught with errors:

The nail was shorter than Haas had reported and thus would not have been long enough to pierce two heel bones and the wood. Pieces of bone had been misidentified. There was no bone from a second heel; the nail-pierced only one heel. Some of the bone fragments were from another individual.

Zias and Sekeles also stated the presence of the scratch in one of the forearms "was not convincing" evidence of a nail wound:

Many non-traumatic scratches and indentations similar to these are found on ancient skeletal material. In fact, two similar non-traumatic indentations were observed on the right fibula, neither are connected with the crucifixion...Thus, the lack of traumatic injury to the forearm and metacarpals of the hand seems to suggest that the arms of the condemned were tied rather than nailed to the cross.

In conclusion, the findings of Zias and Sekeles do not indicate whether in this case a horizontal patibulum cross-beam was attached to the upright stake to which the victim's heel was nailed. The evidence was so ambiguous concerning the arms that Zias and Sekeles had to rely on the data provided by contemporary writings to support their reconstruction of the position of the arms as attached to a crossbar:

The literary sources for the Roman period contain numerous descriptions of crucifixion but few exact details as to how the condemned were affixed to the cross. Unfortunately, the direct physical evidence here is also limited to one right heel calcaneum (heel bone) pierced by an 11.5 cm iron nail with traces of wood at both ends.

Their reconstruction includes a crossbar which the condemned man could carry to the place of execution, and which could be used repeatedly for attachment to the upright stake permanently fixed in the ground:

In reconstructing the crucifixion we have used the skeletal evidence which was available in conjunction with observations by Haas, Barbet and the ancient historical sources. According to these sources, the condemned man never carried the complete cross, as is commonly believed; instead the crossbar was carried, while the upright was set in a permanent place where it was used for subsequent executions. Furthermore, we know from Josephus that during the first century C.E., wood was so scarce in Jerusalem that the Romans were forced to travel ten miles from Jerusalem to secure timber for their siege machinery. Therefore, one can reasonably assume that the scarcity of wood may have been expressed in the economics of crucifixion in that the crossbar, as well as the upright, would be used repeatedly. Thus, the lack of traumatic injury to the forearm and metacarpals of the hand seems to suggest that the arms of the condemned were tied rather than nailed to the cross. There is ample literary and artistic evidence for the use of ropes rather than nails to secure the condemned to the cross. Moreover, in Egypt, where according to one source crucifixion originated, the victim was not nailed but tied. It is important to remember that death by crucifixion was the result of the manner in which the condemned man hung from the cross and not the traumatic injury caused by nailing. Hanging from the cross resulted in a painful process of asphyxiation, in which the two sets of muscles used for breathing, the intercostal muscles and the diaphragm, became progressively weakened. In time, the condemned man expired, due to the inability to continue breathing properly.

== Sources ==
- Zias; Sekeles (1985). "The Crucified Man from Giv'at ha-Mitvar: A Reappraisal". Israel Exploration Journal. 35.
