= Acts of Philip =

4th-century Christian text

The Greek Acts of Philip (Acta Philippi) is an episodic gnostic apocryphal book of acts from the mid-to-late fourth century, originally in fifteen separate acta, that gives an accounting of the miraculous acts performed by the Apostle Philip, with overtones of the heroic romance.

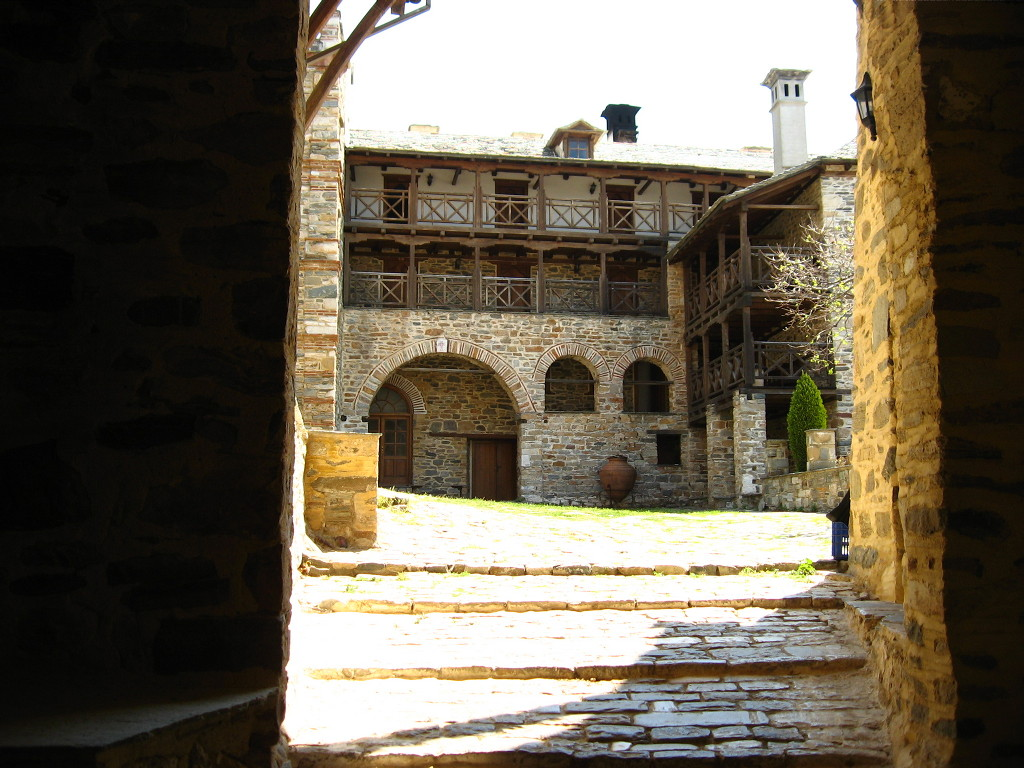
Courtyard of the Xenophontos monastery on Mount Athos where the complete text of the Acts of Philip was discovered

== History ==
The Acts of Philip is most completely represented by a text discovered in 1974 by François Bovon and Bertrand Bouvier in the library of Xenophontos monastery on Mount Athos in Greece. The manuscript dates from the fourteenth century but its language identifies it as a copy of a fourth-century original. Many of the narratives in the manuscript were already known from other sources, but some were hitherto unknown.

Bovon at first suggested that the text's character named Mariamne may be identical to Mary Magdalene.

However, following the Discovery Channel's popularized speculations in The Lost Tomb of Jesus, Bovon underlined that, while he believes that the Mariamne in the Acts of Philip may be Mary Magdalene, he does not believe that the Mariamne of the Talpiot tomb discussed in The Lost Tomb of Jesus is the same person, not that Mary Magdalene's real name was Mariamne.

Writing in an open letter to the Society of Biblical Literature:

I do not believe that Mariamne is the real name of Mary of Magdalene. Mariamne is, besides Maria or Mariam, a possible Greek equivalent, attested by Josephus, Origen, and the Acts of Philip, for the Semitic Myriam. The Mariamne of the Acts of Philip is part of the apostolic team with Philip and Bartholomew; she teaches and baptizes: Philip baptizes men, Mary baptizes women. In the beginning, her faith is stronger than Philip's faith. This portrayal of Mariamne fits very well with the portrayal of Mary of Magdala in the Manichean Psalms, the Gospel of Mary, and Pistis Sophia. My interest is not historical, but on the level of literary traditions. I have suggested this identification in 1984 already in an article of New Testament Studies.

New translations of the full text as discovered by Bovon have been published in French, 1996, and in English in 2012. Previous English translations, such as that in M.R. James, are based on the collections of fragments that were known previous to Bovon's discovery.

A Medieval icon from Arsos in Cyprus depicts some of the events recounted in the acts.

== Contents ==
The narrative recounts that Jesus sent out a group of followers to spread his message. The followers were Philip, Bartholomew, and a woman named Mariamne, who is identified in the text as Philip's sister, and is a leading figure in the second half of the text. They form a community that seems to practice vegetarianism and celibacy, and uses a form of the eucharist where vegetables and water were consumed in place of bread and wine. Mariamne wears men's clothes and holds positions of authority comparable to men, serving as a priest and a deacon. Due to this, the Acts have been proposed to be an Encratite text with Gnostic influences, with Mariamne's clothing reaffirming her resistance against the snake of Eden's seduction of Eve.

The group travels through pagan lands spreading Christianity by performing powerful miracles, in a series of cycles that has been described to owe "as much to Christian doctrine, which they try to endorse, as they do to the raw material of Eastern and Mediterranean mythology, which they shamelessly exploit." Among their miraculous accomplishments were the conversion of a talking leopard and a talking goat into additional companions, a feat familiar in the (non-canonical) apostolic Acts.

Phillip and his companions are sent by Jesus to preach in the city of the Ophianoi, pagans that worship a race of snakes and dragons. This city, named as Ophiorhyme, is identified with Hierapolis, the site of Phillip's tomb and cult. The group crosses various lands in route to the city while exorcizing monsters, which are revealed to be demons, as well as the offspring of the snakes into which the Pharaoh's sorcerers turned their staffs. After their submission, Phillip turns them into black men in order for them to build a church before disappearing. The group arrives in the city, where the inhabitants attack them and subject them to pagan trials, but they defeat them by working miracles, and ultimately reach the city's gated temple, where the Echidna or mother of the snakes is worshipped. The temple and the monster are then sent to the abyss in a final miracle.

Some of the text's episodes are identifiable as belonging to more closely related "cycles". Two episodes recounting events of Philip's commission (3 and 8) have survived in both shorter and longer versions. There is no commission narrative in the surviving texts: Philip's authority rests on the prayers and benediction of Peter and John and is explicitly bolstered by a divine epiphany, in which the voice of Jesus urges "Hurry Philip! Behold, my angel is with you, do not neglect your task" and "Jesus is secretly walking with him".(ch. 3).

== Editions ==
- Bovon, F., B. Bouvier, F. Amsler, Acta Philippi: Textus (Turnhout, 1999) (Corpus Christianorum, 11).
- Amsler, F. Acta Philippi: Commentarius (Turnhout, 1999) (Corpus Christianorum, 12).
- F. Amsler et A. Frey (еdd), Concordantia Actorum Philippi (Turnhout, 2002) (Instruments pour l’étude des langues de l’Orient ancien, 4).

== Translations ==
- F. Bovon, B. Bouvier, F. Amsler, Actes de l'apôtre Philippe: Introduction, notes et traductions, Turnhout: Brepols 1996 (= Apocryphes. Collection de poche de l'AELAC 8). ISBN 978-2-503-50422-3.
- François Bovon and Christopher R. Matthews, The Acts of Philip: a new translation, Baylor University Press, 2012. ISBN 9781602586550.

== Studies ==
- De Santos Otero, "Acta Philippi," in W. Schneemelcher (ed), New Testament Apocrypha. vol. II (Writings Related to the Apostles, Apocalypses and Related Subjects) (Cambridge-Louisville, 1992), 468–473.
- Bovon, F., B. Bouvier, F. Amsler, Actes de l'apôtre Philippe (Tournhout, 1996) (Apocryphes, 8).
- Bovon, F., "Mary Magdalene in the Acts of Philip", in F. Stanley Jones (ed.), Which Mary? (Atlanta: Society of Biblical Literature) 2002, 75–89.
- Bovon, F. "Women Priestesses in the Apocryphal Acts of Philip," in S. Matthews, C. Briggs Kittredge and M. Johnson-DeBaufre (eds), Walk in the Ways of Wisdom: Essays in Honor of Elisabeth Schüssler Fiorenza (Harrisburg, 2003), 109–121.
