= Talpiot =

Neighborhood in Jerusalem, Israel

Coordinates: 31°45′N 35°13′E

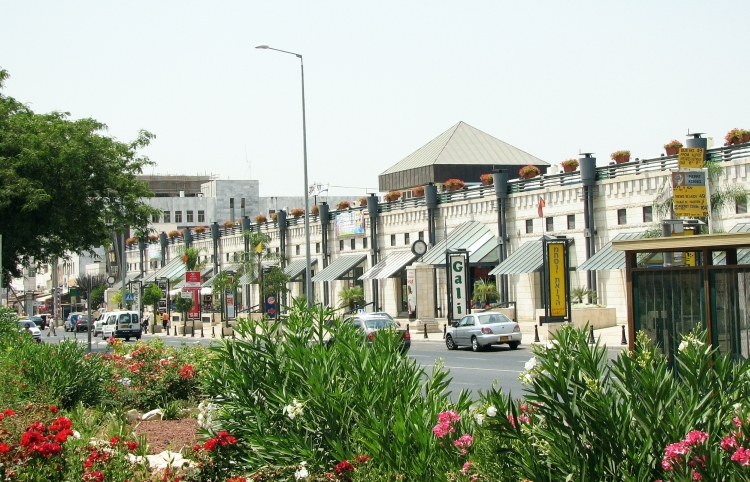
Kenyon Hadar shopping mall on Pierre Koenig Street in Talpiot

Talpiot (Hebrew: תלפיות, literally 'turrets' or 'magnificently built') is an Israeli neighborhood in southeastern Jerusalem, established in 1922 by Zionist pioneers. It was built as a garden suburb on land purchased by the Tel Aviv-based Palestine Land Development Company and other Jewish building societies.

Talpiot has become a major commercial center and a hub of nonprofit organizations. The Talpiot industrial zone is one of the largest in the country, with plans for expansion as a center of shopping, entertainment and industry.

Today Arnona and Talpiot are used interchangeably with no real distinction between them.

== Etymology ==
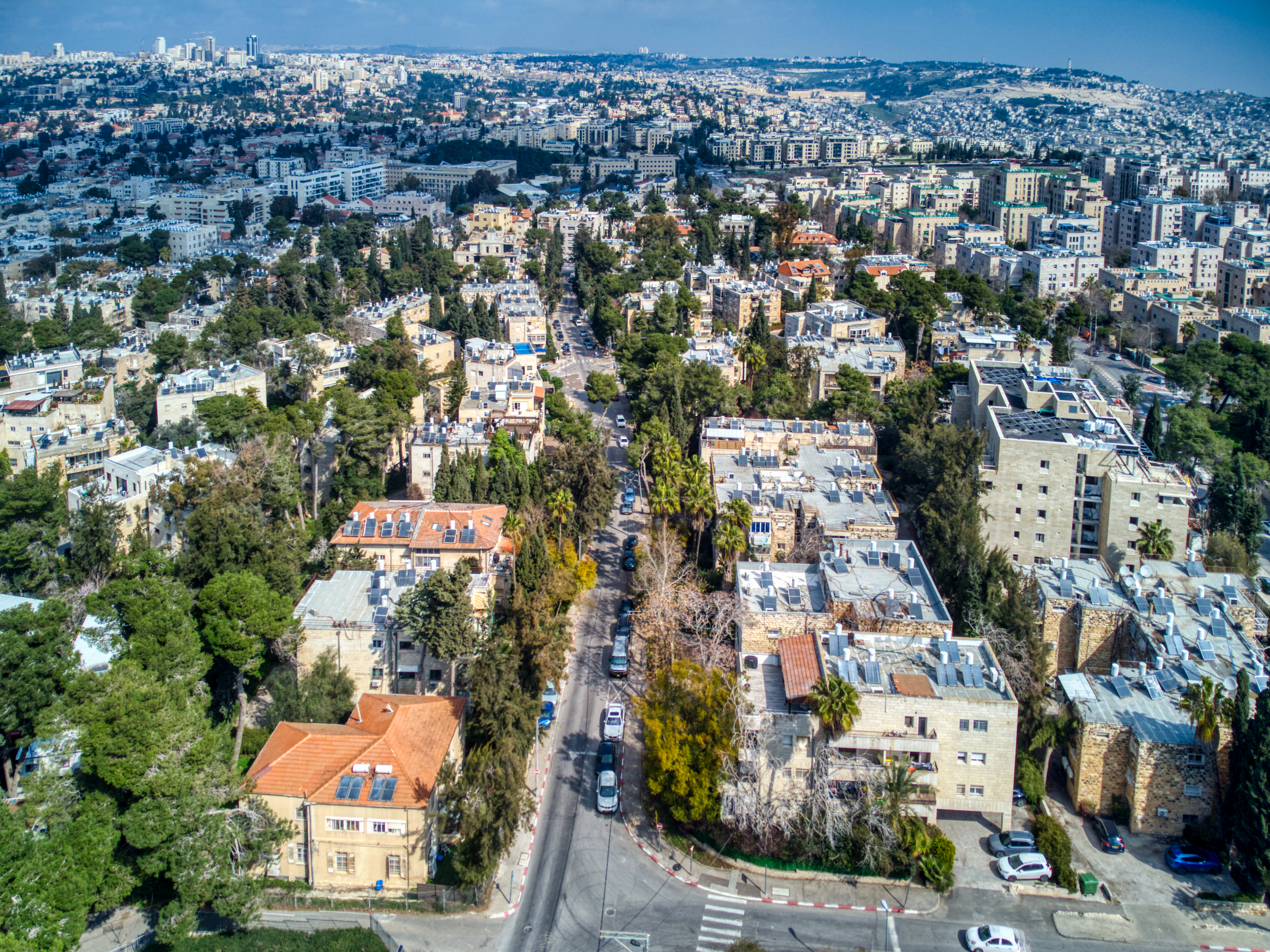
An aerial view of the neighbourhood

The name Talpiot derives from a verse in Song of Songs 4:4: "Thy neck is like the tower of David, built with turrets". According to rabbinic sources, Talpiot refers to the Temple. It was said to be a compound of the Hebrew words tel (hill) and piyot (mouths), as in "the hill to which all mouths turn in prayer".

== History ==
In the 1920s, the Bauhaus architect Richard Kauffmann presented the British Mandate authorities with a plan for Talpiot, which he designed as a garden suburb. The plan included a large building that he envisioned as a future parliament, redesignated as an art gallery to appease the doubters. The first residents were clerical and office personnel. Living in the neighbourhood required membership in a mutual society to which dues were paid. Despite a British Mandate regulation stating that all buildings in Jerusalem must be made of Jerusalem stone, developers in Talpiot were permitted to use stucco-covered concrete because of the high demand for housing.

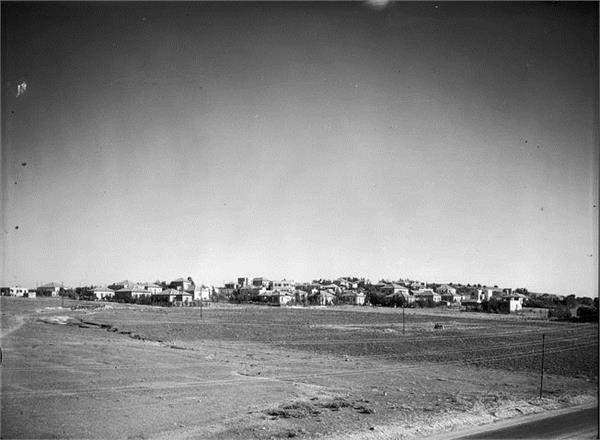
Talpiot 1931

The early settlers were evacuated from Talpiot in the wake of the 1929 Hebron massacre, but they later returned. When the British left Jerusalem in May 1948, a Haganah military brigade launched Operation Kilshon to seize security zones that had been occupied by the British and defend Jerusalem against attacks by the Arab Legion. The British army camp in Talpiot, known as Mahane Allenby, was one of the strategic sites captured in the operation.

After the 1947–1949 Palestine war, Talpiot became the frontier, surrounded by Jordanian-ruled East Jerusalem, but Israelis continued to live there. The neighbourhood expanded significantly after the 1967 Six-Day War. New residential districts were established in the enclave formerly controlled by the United Nations, which had been a no man's land. A tent camp established on the western outskirts of Talpiot for immigrants after Israel's independence was replaced by a large industrial zone to house the businesses evicted from Mamilla.

On May 24, 2001, the third floor of the Versailles wedding hall in Talpiot collapsed during a wedding party, killing 23 and injuring more than 200. The collapse was blamed on poor construction, using a system called Pal-Kal which was deemed unfit for public buildings. The incident is considered one of Israel's worst civil disasters.

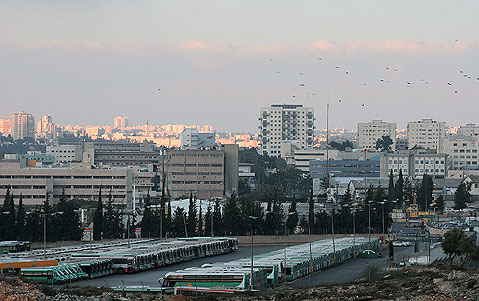
Talpiot industrial zone, 2006

Talpiot today consists of several districts. "Old Talpiot" is the historic residential neighborhood founded in 1922. Adjacent and south of this is Arnona, founded in 1931 but largely undeveloped until the 1980s. North Talpiot, built after 1967, offers panoramic views of the Hinnom and Kidron Valleys, and the Old City. Across Derech Hevron to the west is the Talpiot industrial zone, now one of Jerusalem's main shopping districts. To the east is the neighborhood of East Talpiot, also known as Armon HaNetziv. Mahane Allenby was torn down and eight-story residential towers were built on the land. A parcel remains undeveloped, awaiting the relocation of the US Embassy from Tel Aviv.

The main offices of the US Consulate General in Jerusalem were relocated to the eastern ridge of Talpiot in 2010. In 2018 the embassy of USA relocated from Tel Aviv to the premises of the consulate in the Talpiot neighborhood in Jerusalem.

== Economy ==
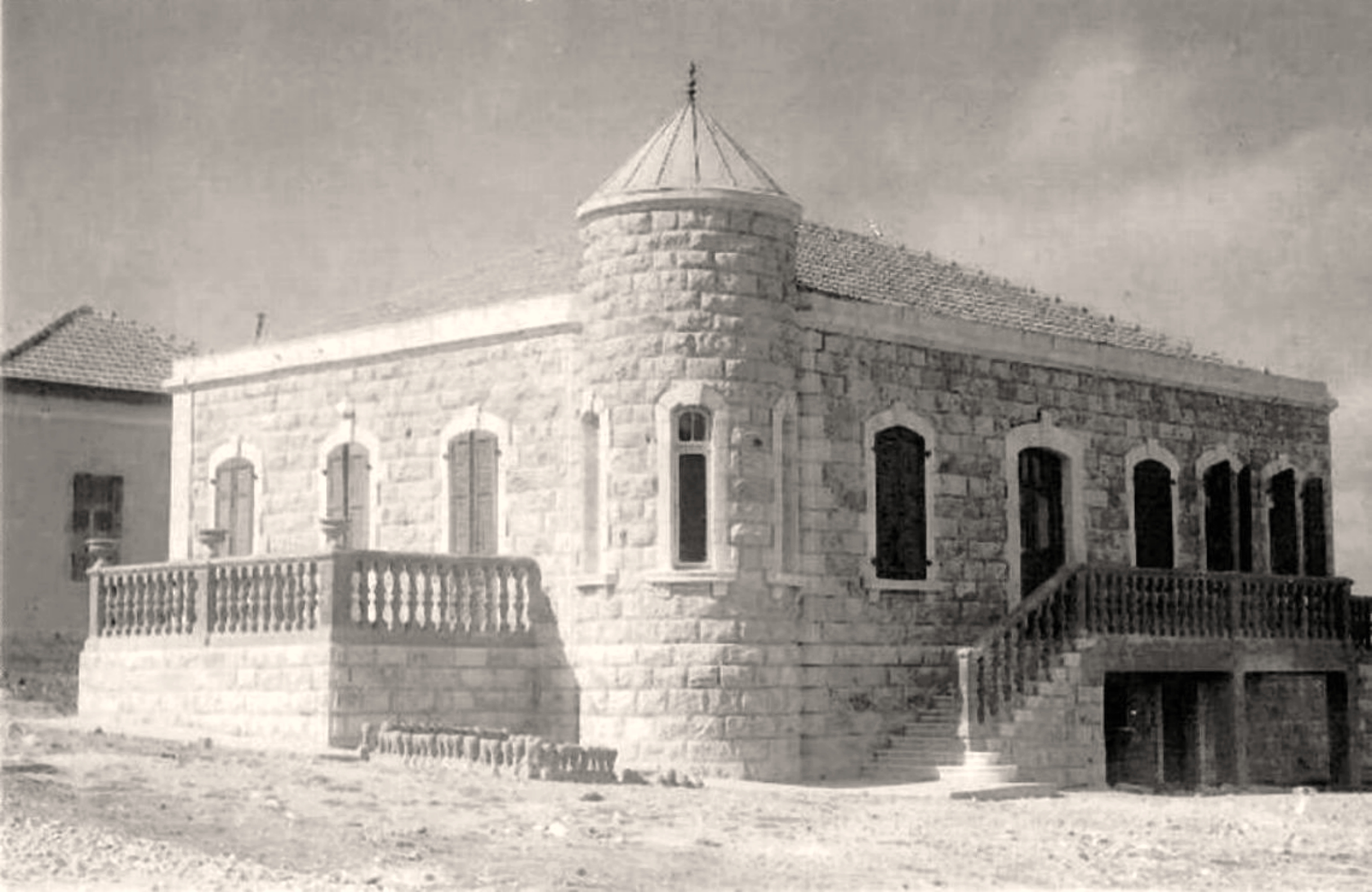
A house in the neighbourhood, 1925.

The Talpiot Industrial Zone is one of the largest in the country, with an annual turnover of NIS600 million. Indoor shopping malls in Talpiot include Kanyon Yisrael on Yad Haharutzim St., Kanyon Hadar on Pierre Koenig St., Kanyon Lev Talpiot on HaUman St. and Kanyon Rav Mecher on HaParsa St. In addition the area is home to numerous strip malls, light manufacturing workshops, warehouses, car dealerships and the largest concentration of auto repair shops in Jerusalem.

== Urban development ==
In 2013, the Jerusalem District Planning and Building Committee approved a new master plan for the Talpiot industrial zone, adding 600,000 square meters of construction including 3,500 new residential units on the edge of the industrial zone and more space for offices, industry and commerce. The idea is to separate the residential, business and industrial sections of the neighborhood while boosting the presence of high-tech companies, academic institutions, offices, banquet halls, movie theaters, health clinics and art galleries.

== Arts and culture ==
'Yellow Submarine', established in 1991 by the Jerusalem Foundation in the Talpiot industrial zone, is a performance space for musicians with rehearsal-rooms, a recording studio and a nightclub.

Israel Hershberg, an American figurative painter established the Jerusalem Studio School on the top floor of an industrial building in 1996.

Talpiot has become a hub of Jerusalem nightlife, with a multiplex cinema, a bowling alley, a pool hall, and dozens of bars, nightclubs and discos, including one of Israel's oldest and most popular nightclubs, Haoman 17.

Non-profit organizations located in Talpiot include the Association of Americans and Canadians in Israel, El HaLev, a center for women's empowerment, the Pardes Institute of Jewish Studies, Melabev, a center for English-speaking senior citizens, and the Israel Free Loan Society.

== Landmarks ==
In 1980, the Talpiot Tomb aka Jesus Family Tomb was discovered. This very controversial archaeological site contained nine ossuaries inscribed with "Y'shua bar Yosef"/Jesus son of Joseph and other family members.

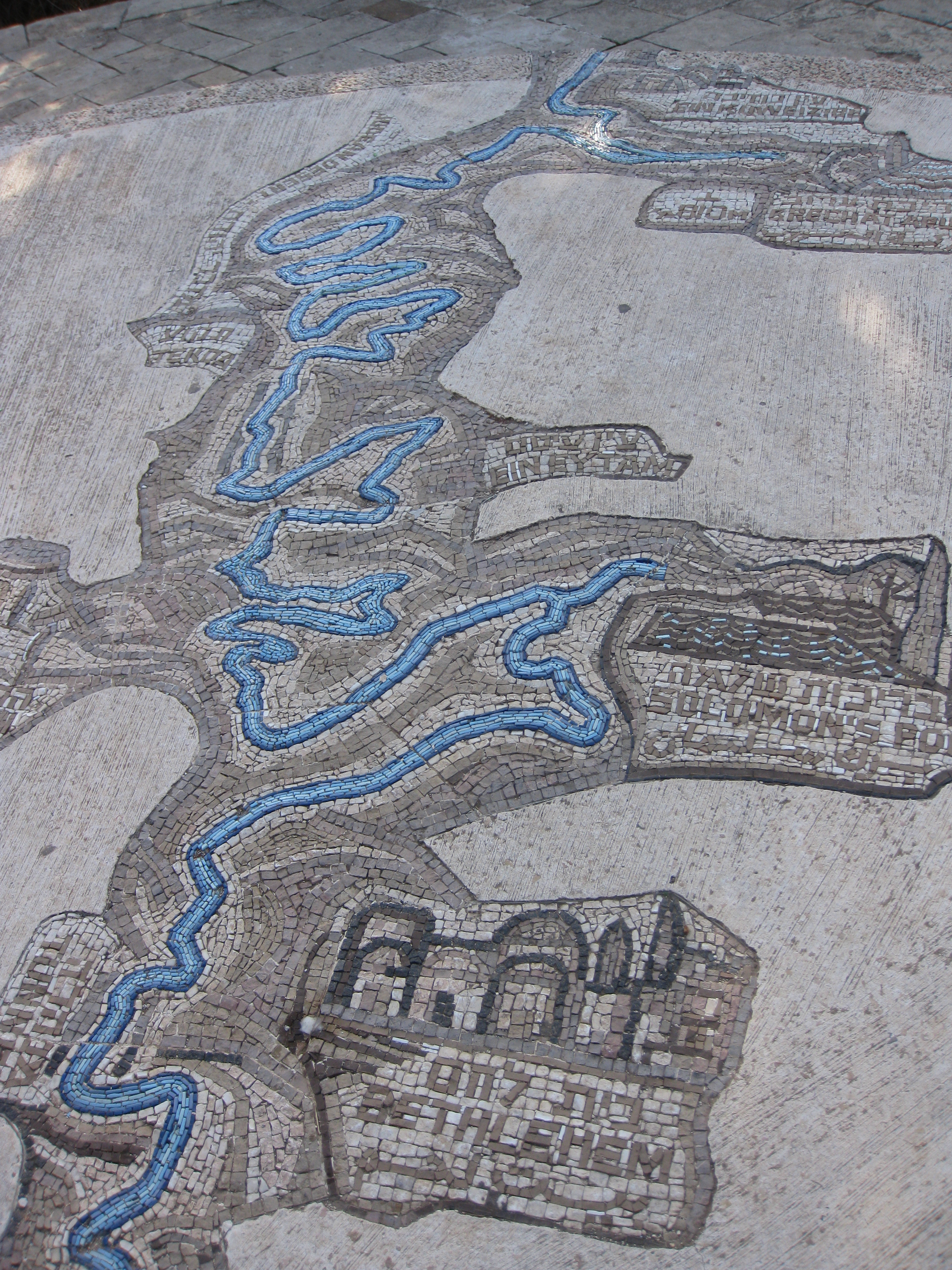
Mosaic map of the aqueducts in E. Talpiot, near the UN Headquarters (Armon HaNetziv)

=== Tayelet ===
Connecting East Talpiot and Talpiot is the Haas Promenade (הטיילת – ha-Tayelet). Together with the Sherover and Goldman Promenades, the three form a continuous public park from the Government House used by the UN and Jabl Mukabar to the east to Abu Tor to the north. From this vantage point atop a ridge overlooking Jerusalem's Old City and the Dead Sea, tradition holds that Abraham was shown Mount Moriah as the site for the binding of Isaac as recorded in the Bible. Hidden under this ridge are the remains of an aqueduct built by Herod the Great to bring water from the south, by way of his summer palace Herodium, to the Second Temple.

This area was a no man's land in the period between the establishment of the State of Israel in 1948 and the reunification of Jerusalem in 1967. At one end of the promenade, on the Hill of Evil Counsel, is the United Nations Middle East Headquarters, located in the former Palace of the British High Commissioner (Armon HaNetziv).

The Jerusalem Peace Forest descends along the slope below the Promenade. The Jerusalem municipality plants a tree in this forest for every child born in Jerusalem, representing the eternal hope of peace bridging the Arab and Jewish populations.

Every year, on the 29th day of Heshvan, the Ethiopian Jewish community gathers at the Promenade to mark the Sigd holiday.

=== World War I cemetery ===
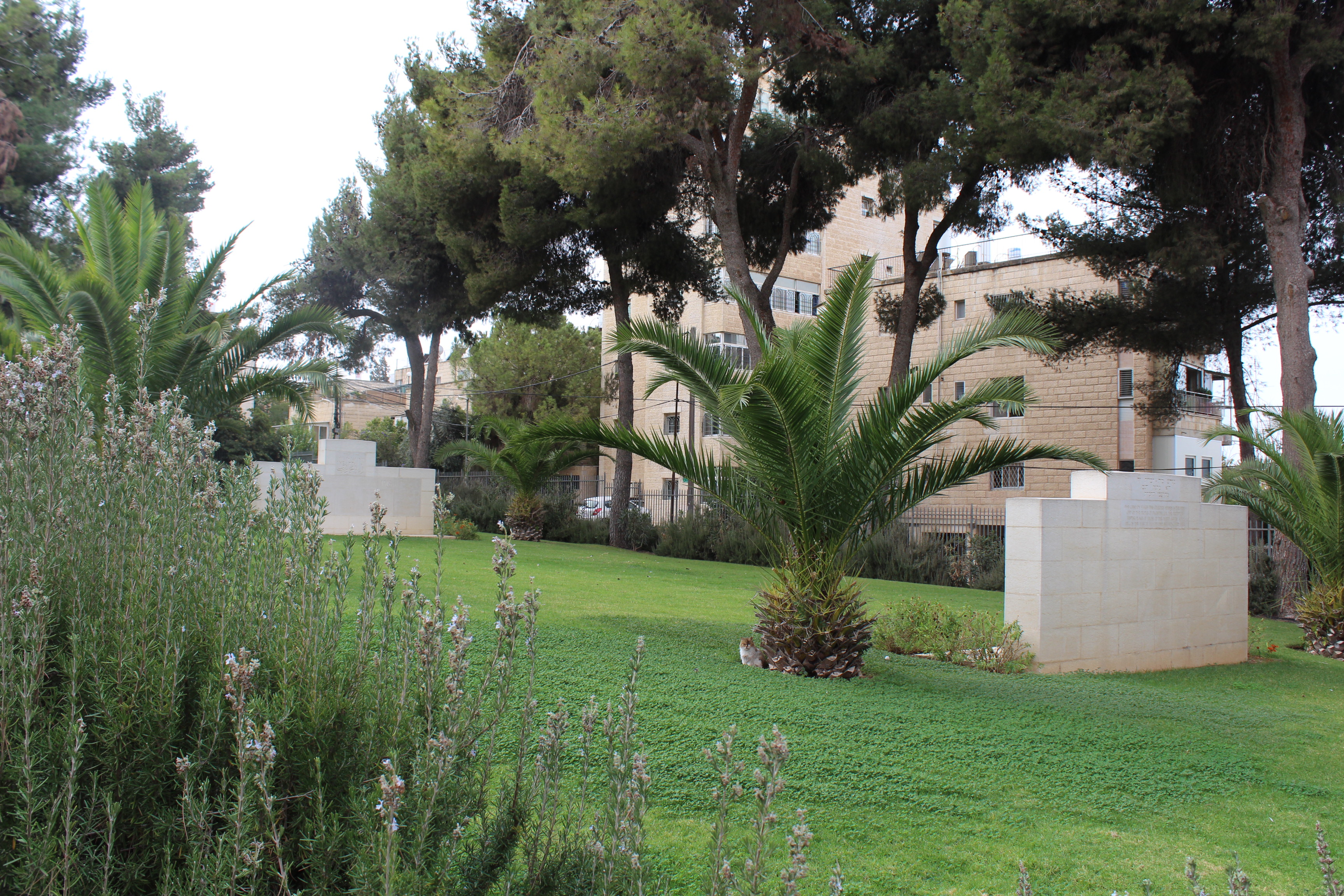
Indian cemetery, Talpiot

A cemetery for Indian soldiers who died fighting for the British Army in World War I is located in Talpiot. Hindus, Sikhs and Muslims are buried there in common graves, with monuments inscribed in English, Hebrew, Sanskrit and Urdu. 290 Turkish soldiers who died as prisoners of war in September and October 1918 are buried in a separate section.

== Notable residents ==
Shmuel Yosef Agnon, winner of the Nobel Prize in Literature, settled in Talpiot in 1924 and wrote most of his important works there. After his death, his home was turned into a museum, Beit Agnon, where his study has been preserved intact.

One of Agnon's neighbors was the eminent scholar Joseph Klausner, uncle of Israeli author Amos Oz. In his autobiographical novel A Tale of Love and Darkness, Oz writes that Agnon and Klausner were not fond of one another and kept their distance.

The founder of Modern Hebrew, Eliezer Ben-Yehuda, built a home on Ein Gedi Street in Talpiot, Beit Ben-Yehuda, but died before moving in. Today it serves as a guesthouse and meeting center.

== See also ==
- Talpiot Tomb
- Ramat Rachel
