= University of the Holy Land =

Christian University in Jerusalem, Israel

- Established: 1986; 40 years ago
- Founders: Dr. Stephen J. Pfann, Dr. Claire Pfann
- President: Dr. Stephen J. Pfann
- Dean: Dr. Claire Pfann
- Academic staff: 14
- Total staff: 24
- Location: 1 Ha-Rosmarin Street, Jerusalem, Israel; 31.729329°N 35.203355°E
- Website: www.uhl.ac

University of the Holy Land is a Christian university in Jerusalem.

== History ==
The University was founded in 1986 by Dr. Stephen J. Pfann and Dr. Claire Pfann, who are known for their archaeological work on the Dead Sea Scrolls. Claire Pfann is a leading expert in biblical archeology and expert on early Christianity at the University of the Holy Land in Jerusalem, where she lives.
