= Amos Kloner =

Israeli archaeologist and professor (1940–2019)

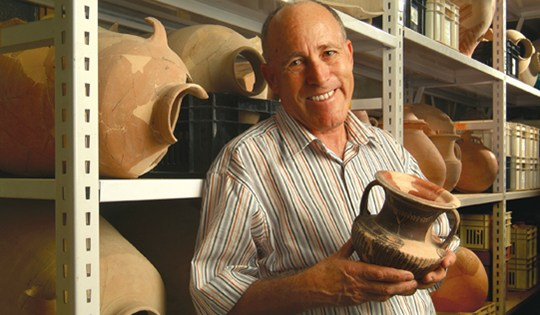
Amos Kloner

Amos Kloner (Hebrew: עמוס קלונר; February 26, 1940 – March 16, 2019) was an Israeli archaeologist and professor emeritus.

== Academic career ==
Amos Kloner taught in the Martin Szusz Department of the Land of Israel Studies at Bar Ilan University in Ramat Gan. His fields were Hellenistic, Roman and Byzantine archaeology.

== Archaeology career ==
One of Kloner's most important work was the research regarding underground cavities in Judaea, the research proved the connection between the Bar Kokhba revolt and the fact that most cavities were used as Bar Kokhba hiding complexes. Kloner along with Boaz Zissu led the Israel Antiquities Authority's excavations and research of the Second Temple period of the Necropolis of Jerusalem. One of the findings was the Talpiot Tomb in 1980. In the 1990s, he was on the team that excavated the Byzantine site of Beit Guvrin.

== Published works (English) ==
- Amos Kloner; Agudah le-seḳer arkheʼologi shel Yiśraʼel (2003). Survey of Jerusalem: the northwestern sector, introduction and indices. Israel Antiquities Authority. ISBN 978-965-406-080-6.
- Amos Kloner; Donald T. Ariel (2003). Maresha Excavations Final Report: Subterranean complexes 21, 44, 70. Israel Antiquities Authority. ISBN 978-965-406-150-6.
- Adi Erlich; Amos Kloner (31 March 2010). Maresha Excavations Final Report II: Hellenistic Terracotta Figurines from the 1989-1996 Seasons. Israel Antiquities Authority. ISBN 978-965-406-212-1.
- Amos Kloner; Adi Erlich (2008). Maresha Excavations Final Report: Hellenistic terracotta figurines from the 1989-1996 seasons. Israel Antiquities Authority. ISBN 978-965-406-201-5.
- Amos Kloner; Boaz Zissu (2007). The Necropolis of Jerusalem in the Second Temple period. Peeters. ISBN 978-90-429-1792-7.
- Gideon Avni; Uzi Dahari; Amos Kloner (2008). The necropolis of Bet Guvrin-Eleutheropolis. Israel Antiquities Authority. ISBN 978-965-406-214-5.
