= François Bovon =

Swiss biblical scholar and historian (1938–2013)

- Born: 13 March 1938; Lausanne, Vaud, Switzerland
- Died: 1 November 2013 (aged 75); Aubonne, Vaud, Switzerland
- Known for: Luc le théologien Das Evangelium nach Lukas (EKK)

Academic background
- Education: University of Lausanne; University of Basel
- Doctoral advisor: Oscar Cullmann

Academic work
- Discipline: New Testament; Early Christianity
- Institutions: Harvard Divinity School

François Bovon (13 March 1938 – 1 November 2013) was a Swiss biblical scholar and historian of early Christianity. He was the Frothingham Professor Emeritus of the History of Religion at Harvard Divinity School. Bovon was a graduate of the University of Lausanne and held a doctorate in theology from the University of Basel (supervised by Oscar Cullmann). From 1967 to 1993, he taught in the Faculty of Theology at the University of Geneva. Bovon was an honorary professor at the University of Geneva and in 1993 he received an honorary doctorate from the Faculty of Theology at Uppsala University, Sweden. He was president of the Swiss Society of Theology from 1973 to 1977 and president of the Studiorum Novi Testamenti Societas in 2000.

Bovon was the author of numerous books on early Christianity, and co-edited the first volume of Écrits apocryphes chrétiens in the series La Pléiade (published by Gallimard). He also wrote several books on Luke the Evangelist and the Gospel of Luke, including a major critical commentary (in the series EKK).

== Select publications ==
- Bovon, François (1974). Les Derniers Jours de Jésus. Collection Flèches. Neuchâtel: Delachaux & Niestlé. OCLC 1501382.
- ——— (1993). Révélations et écritures: Nouveau Testament et littérature apocryphe chrétienne: recueil d'articles. Monde de la Bible. Vol. 26. Genève: Labor et Fides. ISBN 9782830906882. OCLC 230112612.
- ——— (1978). Luke the theologian thirty-three years of research (1950-1983) (trans from Luc le théologien). Princeton theological monographs series. Vol. 12. Allison Park, PA: Pickwick Publications. ISBN 9780915138937. OCLC 266871593. - (trans pub by Neuchâtel: Delachaux et Niestlé in 1978)
- ——— (1999). Nouvel Âge et foi chrétienne: un dialogue critique à partir du Nouveau Testament. Aubonne Moulin. OCLC 901485469.
- ——— (2005). Studies in Early Christianity. Grand Rapids, MI: Baker Academic. ISBN 9780801029356. OCLC 61513244.
- ——— (2002). Luke: Volume 1: A commentary on the Gospel of Luke 1:1-9:50 (trans from Evangelium nach Lukas). Hermeneia--a critical and historical commentary on the Bible. Minneapolis, MN: Fortress Press. ISBN 9780800660444. OCLC 48753958.
- ——— (2012). Luke: Volume 3: A commentary on the Gospel of Luke 19:28-24:53 (trans from Evangelium nach Lukas). Hermeneia--a critical and historical commentary on the Bible. Minneapolis, MN: Fortress Press. ISBN 9780800697600. OCLC 48753958.
- ——— (2013). Luke: Volume 2: A commentary on the Gospel of Luke 9:51-19:27 (trans from Evangelium nach Lukas). Hermeneia--a critical and historical commentary on the Bible. Minneapolis, MN: Fortress Press. ISBN 9780800697594. OCLC 48753958.
- ——— (2013). The Emergence of Christianity: Collected Studies III (ed. Luke Drake). Wissenschaftliche Untersuchungen zum Neuen Testament 319. Tübingen: Mohr Siebeck. ISBN 9783161522062. OCLC 908084976.
