= Joe Zias =

Israeli anthropologist and paleopathologist

- יוסף אדוארד זיאס
- Born: Joseph Edward Zias
- Citizenship: Israel
- Education: Wayne State University (MA, Anthropology)
- Occupations: Anthropologist, paleopathologist
- Years active: 1972–2007
- Employer: Israel Antiquities Authority (IAA)
- Organization: CenturyOne Foundation
- Title: Curator of Archaeology and Anthropology for the IAA
- Term: 1972-1997

Joseph E. Zias (Hebrew: יוסף אדוארד זיאס) was the Curator of Archaeology and Anthropology for the Israel Antiquities Authority from 1972 until his retirement in 1997, with responsibility for items such as the Dead Sea Scrolls, pre-historic human skeletal remains, and artifacts from archaeological sites such as Jericho, Megiddo, and Gezer. He has appeared often in film and television documentaries regarding such artifacts and the subject of the Historical Jesus, including The Mysterious Man of the Shroud for CBS, Who Killed Jesus on BBC in 1997 and Son of God on BBC in 2001, and is a frequent lecturer.

== Work ==
=== Tomb of Absalom inscriptions ===
In 2003, Zias and Émile Puech discovered two mid-4th-century inscriptions on the 1st-century monument known as the Tomb of Absalom, which support the concept known from Byzantine period sources that a tradition existed at the time, wrongly identifying the funeral monument as the tomb of James, the brother of Jesus; Zechariah, the father of John the Baptist; and Simeon, the old priest from the Gospel of Luke.

=== Shroud of Turin ===
The PBS documentary Secrets of the Dead: Shroud of Christ, which aired in April 2004, presented new and controversial claims that the Shroud of Turin was the authentic burial cloth of Jesus. Several experts disputed these opinions, since carbon-dating tests performed in 1988 placed its origin 1300 years too late. Specifically, Zias noted that the shroud depicts a man whose front measures 2 inches taller than his back and said, "Not only is it a forgery, but it's a bad forgery."

=== Megiddo church ===
In 2005, archaeologist Yotam Tepper was in charge of a dig near Megiddo, Israel, uncovering the ruins of what was clearly an early Christian church. The IAA, Zias's former employer, claimed that the site could be dated to the third century A.D., which would make it the earliest Christian church unearthed in the Holy Land, and possibly one of the earliest in the world, older even than the edict of Emperor Constantine which legalized Christian worship. Zias, however, disagreed in print: "My gut feeling is that we are looking at a Roman building that may have been converted to a church at a later date." At a time when Roman authorities still prohibited Christian practice,"If I were a Roman soldier in the third century, I certainly wouldn't want my name on it," he said. "This would not have been a good career move. In fact, it sounds like the kiss of death." Historian Yisca Harani was similarly skeptical, wondering why early church historians would fail to mention a successful place of worship, if it were one.

=== Masada: human remains ===
Years after archaeologist Yigael Yadin literally wrote the book on Masada, claiming that human remains found at the site were those of the last Jewish defenders of the stronghold, which led the Israeli government to provide them a formal state burial in 1969, Zias and forensic expert Azriel Gorski presented evidence that the remains may, in fact, have been those of Roman occupiers. Hebrew University archaeologist Ehud Netzer, who participated in Yadin's Masada dig and later oversaw restoration work there, disputed the new findings, saying that Zias was "building a story on assumptions built on assumptions." Similarly, Zias said that the original team "had the story and went around trying to find the proof."

=== Talpiot Tomb ===
Regarding the Discovery Channel program The Lost Tomb of Jesus, produced by director James Cameron and created by Simcha Jacobovici, which proposed that the Talpiot Tomb site was the actual tomb of Jesus and his family, Zias has said, "Projects like these make a mockery of the archeological profession." These and later comments by Zias led Jacobovici to sue for libel, winning a judgment of ₪800,000 from a Jerusalem court in 2015. The press noted, however, that the decision "did not rule that Jacobovici's assertions were correct, just that Zias… had gone too far in his criticisms."
