= 3rd Canadian Screen Awards =

3rd year of awards given by the Academy of Canadian Cinema & Television

- Date: March 1, 2015
- Location: Four Seasons Centre for the Performing Arts, Toronto
- Hosted by: Andrea Martin

Highlights
- Most awards: Film: Mommy (9); TV: Orphan Black (10)
- Most nominations: Film: Mommy (13); TV: Orphan Black (13)
- Best Motion Picture: Mommy
- Best Dramatic Series: Orphan Black
- Best Comedy Series: Call Me Fitz

Television/radio coverage
- Network: CBC

The 3rd Canadian Screen Awards were held on March 1, 2015, to honour achievements in Canadian film, television, and digital media production in 2014.

Nominations were announced on January 13, 2015. On the film side, Mommy led with 13 nominations, while on the television side the science fiction series Orphan Black also received 13 nominations.

The awards ceremony were hosted by Andrea Martin at the Four Seasons Centre for the Performing Arts in Toronto, Ontario. Awards in many of the technical categories were presented in a series of galas throughout the week before the main ceremony.

Changes to the awards over previous years included the introduction of new categories for Best Cinematography in a Documentary and Best Editing in a Documentary.

== Film ==
Motion Picture	Direction
Mommy — Xavier Dolan, Nancy Grant; Cast No Shadow — Chris Agoston, Christian Sparkes, Allison White; Fall — Mehernaz Lentin; In Her Place — Albert Shin, Igor Drljaca, Yoon Hyun Chan; Maps to the Stars — Martin Katz, Michel Merkt, Saïd Ben Saïd; You're Sleeping Nicole (Tu dors Nicole) — Luc Déry, Kim McCraw	Xavier Dolan, Mommy; David Cronenberg, Maps to the Stars; Atom Egoyan, The Captive; Stéphane Lafleur, You're Sleeping Nicole (Tu dors Nicole); Albert Shin, In Her Place
Actor in a leading role	Actress in a leading role
Antoine Olivier Pilon, Mommy; Evan Bird, Maps to the Stars; Bruce Greenwood, Elephant Song; Michael Murphy, Fall; Ryan Reynolds, The Captive	Anne Dorval, Mommy; Ahn Ji-hye, In Her Place; Julianne Côté, You're Sleeping Nicole (Tu dors Nicole); Julianne Moore, Maps to the Stars; Yoon Da-gyeong, In Her Place
Actor in a supporting role	Actress in a supporting role
John Cusack, Maps to the Stars; Justin Chatwin, Bang Bang Baby; Kris Demeanor, The Valley Below; Marc-André Grondin, You're Sleeping Nicole (Tu dors Nicole); Robert Pattinson, Maps to the Stars	Suzanne Clément, Mommy; Sandrine Bisson, 1987; Gil Hae-yeon, In Her Place; Catherine St-Laurent, You're Sleeping Nicole (Tu dors Nicole); Mia Wasikowska, Maps to the Stars
Original Screenplay	Adapted Screenplay
Xavier Dolan, Mommy; Atom Egoyan and David B. Fraser, The Captive; Pearl Ball-Harding and Albert Shin, In Her Place; Bruce Wagner, Maps to the Stars; Stéphane Lafleur, You're Sleeping Nicole (Tu dors Nicole)	Nicolas Billon, Elephant Song; Scott Abramovitch, The Calling; Joel Thomas Hynes, Cast No Shadow
Feature Length Documentary	Short Documentary
Super Duper Alice Cooper — Sam Dunn, Reginald Harkema, Scot McFadyen; All That We Make (Fermières) — Annie St-Pierre, Luc Déry, Élaine Hébert, Kim McCraw; Guidelines (La marche à suivre) — Jean-François Caissy, Johanne Bergeron, Colette Loumède; Marinoni: The Fire in the Frame — Tony Girardin	Jutra — Marie-Josée Saint-Pierre, Marc Bertrand, René Chénier; The Chaperone 3D — Fraser Munden; Seth's Dominion — Luc Chamberland, Gerry Flahive, Michael Fukushima, Marcy Page
Live Action Short Drama	Animated Short
Hole — Martin Edralin, Laura Perlmutter, Andrew Nicholas McCann Smith; The Cut (La Coupe) — Geneviève Dulude-De Celles, Fanny Drew, Sarah Mannering; Follow the Fox (Suivre la piste du renard) — Simon Laganière; Little Brother (Petit frère) — Rémi St-Michel, Jean-Sébastien Beaudoin Gagnon, Eric K. Boulianne; Sleeping Giant — Andrew Cividino, Karen Harnisch, Marc Swenker, Aaron Yeger	Me and My Moulton — Lise Fearnley, Torill Kove, Marcy Page; Day 40 — Sol Friedman; Improvisation no.1: Cumulative Loops — Luigi Allemano; Migration — Mark Lomond and Johanne Ste-Marie; Soif — René Chénier, Michèle Cournoyer, Galilé Marion-Gauvin, Marcel Jean
Art Direction/Production Design	Cinematography
Paul Denham Austerberry and Nigel Churcher, Pompeii; Phillip Barker, The Captive; Xavier Georges, Cast No Shadow; William Layton, Fall; Colombe Raby, Mommy	André Turpin, Mommy; Norayr Kasper, Fall; Mathieu Laverdière, Henri Henri; Luc Montpellier, It Was You Charlie; Michel La Veaux, Meetings with a Young Poet
Costume Design	Editing
Wendy Partridge, Pompeii; Valérie Levesque, 1987; Francesca Chamberland, Henri Henri; Xavier Dolan, Mommy; Sarah Dunsworth, Trailer Park Boys: Don't Legalize It	Xavier Dolan, Mommy; Greg Ng, Afflicted; Arthur Tarnowski, Henri Henri; Albert Shin, In Her Place; Ron Sanders, Maps to the Stars
Overall Sound	Sound Editing
Greg Chapman, Peter Persaud, Andrew Stirk, Andrew Tay and Mark Zsifkovits, Pompeii; Christopher Guglick, Dave Mercel, Steve Moore, Justin Sawyer and Alex Turner, Bang Bang Baby; Christian Cooke, Michael O'Farrell and Orest Sushko, Maps to the Stars; Daniel Bisson, Gilles Corbeil and Bernard Gariépy Strobl, Meetings with a Young Poet; Sylvain Brassard, Jo Caron, François Grenon and Luc Landry, Mommy	Steve Baine, Kevin Banks, Stephen Barden, Fred Brennan, Alex Bullick, J.R. Fountain, Kevin Howard and Jill Purdy, Pompeii; Elma Bello, Fall; Christian Rivest, Henri Henri; Raymond Legault, Simon Meilleur, Martin Pinsonnault and Claire Pochon, Meetings with a Young Poet; Sylvain Brassard, Benoît Dame, Isabelle Favreau and Guy Francoeur, Mommy
Achievement in Music: Original Score	Achievement in Music: Original Song
Howard Shore, Maps to the Stars; Jeffrey Morrow, Cast No Shadow; Dan Mangan and Jesse Zubot, Hector and the Search for Happiness; Patrick Lavoie, Henri Henri; Patrice Dubuc and Gaëtan Gravel, Meetings with a Young Poet	Manjeet Ral, "Dal Makhani" (Dr. Cabbie); Ian LeFeuvre, "The Whisper in Me" (Dirty Singles); Lewis Furey, "Road to Rainbow's End" (Love Project); Patric Caird and Sonya Cote, "Danse Elegant" (Tru Love); Dan Mangan, "Wants" (The Valley Below)
Make-Up	Visual Effects
Maïna Militza, Mommy; Virginie Boudreau, 1987; Lizane Lasalle, Henri Henri; Colleen Quinton, Meetings with a Young Poet; Amanda O'Leary, Trailer Park Boys: Don't Legalize It	Keith Acheson, Dennis Berardi, Ayo Burgess, Naomi Foakes, Jo Hughes, Chris MacLean, Mohsen Mousavi, Scott Riopelle, Andy Robinson and Eric Robinson, Pompeii; Jason Dowdeswell, Neil Eskuri, Patti Gannon, Ivan Hayden, Neil Impey, Zach Lipovsky, James Rorick and Adele Venables, Afflicted; Ian Britton, Robert Crowther, Steve Elliott, Oleksiy Golovchenko, Matt Philip, Jiang Shuming, Jay Stanners, Rob Tasker, Perunika Yorgova and Lexi Young, Wet Bum
Best Cinematography in a Documentary	Best Editing in a Documentary
Patrick McLaughlin, Everything Will Be; Geoffroy Beauchemin, Alex Margineanu, Sami Mermer, Francois Vincelette, The Sower (Le semeur); Nicolas Canniccioni, Jean-Pierre St-Louis, Where I'm From (D’ou je viens); Nicolas Canniccioni, Guidelines (La marche à suivre); Marie Davignon, Jessica Lee Gagné, Geneviève Perron, All That We Make (Fermières)	Reginald Harkema and Alex Shuper, Super Duper Alice Cooper; Mathieu Bouchard-Malo, Guidelines (La marche à suivre); Tony Girardin, Marinoni: The Fire in the Frame; Robert Kennedy, Altman; Myriam Magassouba, All That We Make (Fermières)
Claude Jutra Award	Golden Screen Award
Jeffrey St. Jules, Bang Bang Baby	Pompeii

== Television ==
=== Programs ===
Drama series	Comedy series
Orphan Black; 19-2; Continuum; Motive; Remedy	Call Me Fitz; Mr. D; Seed; Spun Out; Tiny Plastic Men
Animated program or series	Documentary program
Rocket Monkeys; Fangbone!; Grojband; Justin Time; Numb Chucks	Our Man in Tehran; The Lost Highway; Once More, The Story of VIN 903847; Sector Sarajevo; Takedown: The DNA of GSP
Children's or youth fiction	Children's or youth non-fiction
Degrassi; The Next Step; Total Drama All-Stars	Japanizi: Going, Going, Gong!; Gaming Show (In My Parents' Garage); Giver; Museum Diaries; The Next Star
Dramatic Mini-Series or TV Movie	History Documentary Program or Series
Bomb Girls: Facing the Enemy; Baby Sellers; The Best Laid Plans; Bunks	Apocalypse: World War I; 28 Heroes; Camp X: Secret Agent School; War Story; Who Killed Gandhi?
International Drama	Lifestyle Program or Series
Vikings; The Great Martian War	Income Property; Buying & Selling with the Property Brothers; The Illegal Eater; One Night Stand with Annie Sibonney; You Gotta Eat Here!
Music Program or Series	Biography or Arts Documentary Program or Series
2014 MuchMusic Video Awards; Corb Lund: Memphis Sun; God's Greatest Hits; Johnny Reid: A Christmas Gift to You; We Day 2013	Unsung: Behind the Glee; Alias; Chaos on the Bridge; Jingle Bell Rocks; The Kid From La Puente
Pre-School Program or Series	Reality/Competition Program or Series
The Adventures of Napkin Man; Peg + Cat; Stella and Sam; Yup Yups; Zerby Derby	The Amazing Race Canada; Big Brother Canada; Masterchef Canada; The Ultimate Fighter Nations: Canada vs. Australia; Unusually Thicke
Science or Nature Documentary Program or Series	Social/Political Documentary Program (Donald Brittain Award)
The Nature of Things: "Invasion of the Brain Snatchers"; Mission Asteroid; Secrets in the Bones: The Hunt for the Black Death Killer; Wild Canada; Wild Things with Dominic Monaghan	Tales from the Organ Trade; The Exhibition; The Ghosts in Our Machine; Out of Mind, Out of Sight
Factual Program or Series	Variety or sketch comedy program or series
Ice Pilots NWT; Cold Water Cowboys; Emergency Room: Life + Death at VGH; Scam City; Tessa & Scott	Rick Mercer Report; Funny as Hell; Seth Rogen: Hilarity for Charity; This Hour Has 22 Minutes
Golden Screen Award for TV Drama/Comedy	Golden Screen Award for TV Reality Show
Rookie Blue; The Listener; Motive; Murdoch Mysteries; Saving Hope	The Amazing Race Canada; Battle of the Blades; Big Brother Canada; Dragon's Den; MasterChef Canada
Diversity Award
The Exhibition

=== Actors ===
Lead actor, drama	Lead actress, drama
Jared Keeso, 19-2; Adam Beach, Arctic Air; Dillon Casey, Remedy; Mike McLeod, Forgive Me; David Sutcliffe, Cracked	Tatiana Maslany, Orphan Black; Megan Follows, Reign; Meaghan Rath, Being Human; Jennie Raymond, Sex & Violence; Jackie Torrens, Sex & Violence
Lead actor, comedy	Lead actress, comedy
Don McKellar, Sensitive Skin; Gerry Dee, Mr. D; Dave Foley, Spun Out; Adam Korson, Seed; Mark Meer, Tiny Plastic Men	Joanna Cassidy, Call Me Fitz; Andrea Martin, Working the Engels; Carrie-Lynn Neales, Seed; Kacey Rohl, Working the Engels; Julia Voth, Package Deal
Lead actor, television film or miniseries	Lead actress, television film or miniseries
Jonas Chernick, The Best Laid Plans; David Hirsh, Twist of Faith; Nathaniel Parker, Still Life: A Three Pines Mystery; Kyle Schmid, Saul: Journey to Damascus	Jodi Balfour, Bomb Girls: Facing the Enemy; Jennifer Finnigan, Baby Sellers; Kate Hewlett, Still Life: A Three Pines Mystery
Supporting actor, drama	Supporting actress, drama
Jordan Gavaris, Orphan Black; Paul Amos, Lost Girl; Benz Antoine, 19-2; Dan Petronijevic, 19-2; Hugh Thompson, Forgive Me	Ali Liebert, Bomb Girls; Jane Alexander, Forgive Me; Olympia Dukakis, Sex & Violence; Laurence Leboeuf, 19-2; Maxim Roy, 19-2
Supporting actor, comedy	Supporting actress, comedy
Jonathan Torrens, Mr. D; Marty Adams, Spun Out; Elliott Gould, Sensitive Skin; Peter MacNeill, Call Me Fitz; Jay Malone, Package Deal	Lauren Ash, Spun Out; Lauren Hammersley, Mr. D; Anne Openshaw, Call Me Fitz; Azura Skye, Working the Engels; Naomi Snieckus, Mr. D
Performance in a children's or youth program or series	Performance in a guest role, drama series
Aislinn Paul, Degrassi; Richard Harmon, If I Had Wings; Christian Potenza, Total Drama All-Stars; Brittany Raymond, The Next Step; Charlie Storwick, Some Assembly Required	Callum Keith Rennie, Motive; Nicola Correia-Damude, Remedy; Clayne Crawford, Rogue; Brenda Fricker, Forgive Me; Carol Sinclair, Sex & Violence
Performance in an animated program or series	Performance in a variety or sketch comedy program or series
Scott McCord, Justin Time; Dan Chameroy, Oh No! It's an Alien Invasion; Sean Cullen, Oh No! It's an Alien Invasion; Mark Edwards, Rocket Monkeys; Julie Lemieux, Dinopaws	Rick Mercer, Rick Mercer Report; Mark Critch, Cathy Jones, Susan Kent and Shaun Majumder, This Hour Has 22 Minutes; Jon Dore, Funny as Hell; Kira Isabella, Studio 14 Sessions; Johnny Reid, Johnny Reid: A Christmas Gift to You

=== News and information ===
News special	News reportage, local
CBC News (The National, CBC News Network and CBC New Brunswick), Moncton Shooting: The Capture of Justin Bourque - Derek Desouza, Mark Harrison, Darrow MacIntyre, Mark Ross, Kate Scroggins; Global Ontario, Decision Ontario - Wayne Hardie, Michael Hennigar, Sharon Murphy, Amy Saracino, Dave Trafford, Mark Trueman; CBC Montreal, CBC News: Quebec Votes 2014 - Debra Arbec, Andrew Chang, Catherine Cullen, Peter Johnson, Nancy Wood; CP24, Your Vote 2014: The Race for Ontario - Brian Carr, Troy Gallant, Murray King, Joanne MacDonald, Linda Oland, Liana Vangelisti, Stacy Voudouris	Global British Columbia, "Mount Polley mine disaster" - John Daly, Jas Johal, Marc Riddell; CBC News Toronto, "Mammoliti Fundraiser" - Zach Dubinsky, Heather Evans, John Lancaster; CBC News Vancouver, "Code White: Violence in Health Care" - Natalie Clancy, Robb Douglas, Paisley Woodward; City Toronto, "When the Blue Line...Flatlines" - John Cao, Avery Haines, Nicole McCormack
News reportage, national	Local newscast
Janis Mackey Frayer, CTV National News: "They Would Bury the Children Last"; Adrienne Arsenault, The National: "Canadian Jihadis"; Susan Ormiston, The National: "Dispatches Ukraine"; Kathy Tomlinson, The National: "Foreign Workers"	CBC News: Toronto; CBC News: Here & Now; CBC News: Nova Scotia; CTV News Toronto
National newscast	News information series
Global National; CTV National News; The National	The Fifth Estate; 16:9; Daily Planet; Marketplace
News anchor, local	News anchor, national
Chris Gailus, Global BC; Michelle Dubé, CTV Toronto; Kevin Frankish, City Toronto (Breakfast Television); Ken Shaw, CTV Toronto; Janet Stewart, CBC Winnipeg	Lisa LaFlamme, CTV National News; Dawna Friesen, Global National; Heather Hiscox, CBC News Now; Peter Mansbridge, The National
Host or interviewer, news or information program or series	News or information program
Tom Kennedy, W5; Andrew Chang, CBC News: Quebec Votes 2014; Gillian Findlay, The Fifth Estate; Carolyn Jarvis, 16:9; Evan Solomon, Power & Politics	The Fifth Estate: "Made in Bangladesh"; 16:9: "The Unspooling Mind"; W5: "Deadly Care"; W5: "Heavy Burden"
Host in a children's, preschool or youth program or series	Host in a Variety, Lifestyle, Reality/Competition, or Talk Program or Series
Yannick Bisson, The Adventures of Napkin Man; Carlos Bustamante, The Next Star; Lisa Gilroy, Undercover High; Kara Harun, TVOKids: The Space	Andrew Younghusband, Don't Drive Here; Matt Basile, Rebel Without a Kitchen; Steve Patterson, I Wrecked My House; Les Stroud, Survivorman: Argentina; Teddy Wilson, InnerSPACE

=== Sports ===
Live sporting event coverage	Sports analysis or commentary
2014 Winter Olympics; 101st Grey Cup; Hockey Night in Canada	Ray Ferraro, TSN Hockey; Cassie Campbell, 2014 Winter Olympics; Glen Suitor, 101st Grey Cup; Gregg Zaun, Blue Jays Central
Sports host	Sports play-by-play
Ron MacLean, Hockey Night in Canada; James Duthie, Free Agent Frenzy; Scott Russell, 2014 Winter Olympics	Jim Hughson, 2014 Winter Olympics; Bob Cole, Hockey Night in Canada; Chris Cuthbert, 101st Grey Cup; Gord Miller, 2014 IIHF World Junior Hockey Championship Gold Medal Game
Sports feature segment	Sports opening
ReOrientation — Brent Blanchard, Mike Farrell, Paul Harrington, Josh Shiaman, Ken Volden, Aaron Ward; The Man Who Never Was — Brent Blanchard, Matt Cade, Steve Dryden, Josh Shiaman; The National: "Chasing Gold" — Ousama Farag, Stephanie Jenzer, Peter Mansbridge, Claude Panet-Raymond; The National: "Pushing the Limits" — Farhan Ahmad, Greg Hobbs, Stephanie Jenzer, Peter Mansbridge, Dave Rae	101st Grey Cup — Matt Dunn, Owen Ewers, Michael Farber, George Hupka; Hockey Night in Canada: "Stanley Cup Final" — Jeff Shelegy, Tim Thompson; NHL Revealed: A Season Like No Other — Claire Adams, Julie Bristow, Ross Greenburg, Steve Mayer; Super Bowl on SportsCentre — Bruce Arthur, Matt Dunn, Darren Oliver
Sports program or series
What If: The Unlikely Story of Toronto's Baseball Giants — Corey Russell; Home and Really Far Away — Marc Leblanc, Gabriel Levesque, Vincenzo Monteleone, Dan Robson, Elia Saikaly, Paul Sidhu; McMorris & McMorris — Sean Buckley, Jason Ford, David Galloway, Jim Kiriakakis, Oliver Linsley; NHL Revealed: A Season Like No Other — Claire Adams, Julie Bristow, Ross Greenburg, Steve Mayer; Pantload: 25 Years of Prime Time Sports — Corey Russell

=== Craft awards ===
Editorial research	Visual research
Ric Esther Bienstock, Sheila Mandell and Anastasia Trofimova, Tales from the Organ Trade; Juliette Champagne and Julien Labrosse, Doc Zone: "The Mystery of the Bell"; James Ellis, Camp X: Secret Agent School; Tina Verma, The Nature of Things: "Brain Magic: The Power of Placebo"	Valérie Combard and Elizabeth Klinck, Apocalypse: World War I; Kelly Balon and Farhatullah Beig, Who Killed Gandhi?; Erin Chisholm, Sector Sarajevo; Elizabeth Klinck, The Secret Disco Revolution
Make-Up	Costume Design
Debi Drennan, Murdoch Mysteries: "Friday the 13th, 1901"; Jenny Arbour and Linda Preston, Reign: "The Consummation"; Katarina Chovanec and Eva Coudouloux, Bomb Girls: Facing the Enemy; Erik Gosselin and Edwina Voda, Being Human: "Too Far, Fast-Forward!"	Alex Reda, Murdoch Mysteries: "Murdoch in Ragtime"; Resa McConaghy, The Best Laid Plans; Patti Parsons, This Hour Has 22 Minutes: "Episode 22.5"; Angus Strathie, Rogue: "Sex, Drugs, Rock n' Roll"; Cynthia Ann Summers, Baby Sellers
Casting	Visual effects
Sharon Forrest and Susan Forrest, Orphan Black: "Governed by Sound Reason and True Religion"; Deirdre Bowen and Pam Dixon, Sensitive Skin: "The Three Sisters"; Tina Gerussi and Sheila Lane, Mr. D: "Parent Teacher Night"; Jenny Lewis and Sara Kay, The Best Laid Plans; Lisa Parasyn and Jon Comerford, Lost Girl: "In Memoriam"	Vikings: "Invasion" — Dennis Berardi, Mike Borrett, Ovidiu Cinazan, Jeremy Dineen, Maria A. Gordon, Bill Halliday, Eric Lacroix, Jim Maxwell, Julian Parry, Dominic Remane; Being Human: "Old Dog, New Tricks" — Michael Beaulac, Marie-Eve Bedard-Tremblay, Benoît Brière, Vanessa Delarosbil, Maxime Entringer, Gabriele Gennaro, Pierre-Simon Lebrun-Chaput, Jonathan Legris, Elaine Phaneuf, Antoine Rouleau; Copper: "The Place I Called My Home" — Kyle Boylen, John Coldrick, Tony Cybulski, Terence Krueger, Mark Rodziewicz, Rob Tasker, Tom Turnbull, Liana van Rensburg, Allan Walker, Tim Warnock; Murdoch Mysteries: "Murdoch Ahoy" — Robert Crowther, Tony Cybulski, Steve Elliott, Mark Fordham, Min Young Kim, Jason Stalker, Jay Stanners, Liana van Rensburg, Allan Walker, Lexi Young; Orphan Black: "By Means Which Have Never Yet Been Tried" — Anthony De Chellis, Eric Doiron, Nathaniel Larouche, Lon Molnar, Geoff D.E. Scott, Sarah Wormsbecher
Production design/art direction in a fiction program or series	Production design/art direction in a non-fiction program or series
Elizabeth Calderhead and John Dondertman, Orphan Black: "Things Which Have Never Yet Been Done"; Andrew Berry, The Great Martian War 1913–1917; Ross Dempster, Motive: "Raw Deal"; Cheryl Dorsey, Peter Emmink and Doug McCullough, Beauty & the Beast: "Déjà Vu"; Oleg M. Savytski, Remedy: "Homecoming"	Peter Faragher, Andy Roskaft and Sandra Svendsen, Big Brother Canada: "Finale"; Eric Hogan and Tara Hungerford, Take Me Home: "Welcome Home"; Alex Nadon, Juno Awards of 2014; Michael Spike Parks, 2014 MuchMusic Video Awards

=== Photography ===
Photography in a comedy series	Photography in a documentary program or factual series
Douglas Koch, Sensitive Skin: "The Three Sisters"; Ian Bibby, Call Me Fitz: "A Very Special Fitzmas"; Gerald Packer, Seed: "Getting Tail"	John Minh Tran, Our Man in Tehran; Nicholas de Pencier, Liz Marshall, Iris Ng and John Price, The Ghosts in Our Machine; Justin Maguire and Jeff Turner, Wild Canada: "The Eternal Frontier"; Derek Rogers, Camp X: Secret Agent School; John Westheuser, Fight Like Soldiers, Die Like Children
Photography in a drama program or series	Photography in a lifestyle or reality program or series
Aaron Morton, Orphan Black: "By Means Which Have Never Yet Been Tried"; Éric Cayla, Bomb Girls: Facing the Enemy; Éric Cayla, Haven: "The Lighthouse"; Mathias Herndl, Motive: "Raw Deal"; Craig Wright, Lost Girl: "In Memoriam"	Max Attwood, Survivorman: "Tierra del Fuego"; Matt Braun, Food Factory: "What a Hunk!"; Robert Brunton and Jason Tan, One Night Stand with Annie Sibonney: "Barcelona"; Chris Elias, Metal Masters; Karl Roeder, The Ultimate Fighter: Nations: "With Friends Like These"
Photography in a news or information program, series or segment	Photography in a variety or sketch comedy program or series
Kirk Neff, 16×9: "Lev Tahor"; John Badcock, The Fifth Estate: "Made in Bangladesh"; Marc Doucette and Kirk Neff, 16×9: "Fogo Island Inn"; Jerry Vienneau, W5: "The Love of a Child"	Alex Nadon, Juno Awards of 2014; Scott Imler, Corb Lund: Memphis Sun; Darryl Kessler, The Neighbors Dog: "Daniel Romano"; Adam Penney, Heavy Weather Presents

=== Editing ===
Editing in a comedy or variety program or series	Editing in a documentary program or series
Matthew Hannam, Sensitive Skin: "The Return of the Other Davina"; Aden Bahadon, Meet the Family: "Dimwit Dad"; Thorben Bieger, Call Me Fitz: "It's All Fun and Games Until Someone Loses a Fitz"; Patricia Brown and Dean Soltys, Mr. D: "Old School"; Jamie Francey, Corb Lund: Memphis Sun	Steve Weslak, Our Man in Tehran; Michael Hannan, Out of Mind, Out of Sight; Ryan Mullins, Jingle Bell Rocks!; Rosella Tursi, JFK: The Smoking Gun; Eugene Weis, Who the Fuck Is Arthur Fogel?
Editing in a dramatic program or series	Editing in a factual program or series
D. Gillian Truster, Orphan Black: "Governed As It Were by Chance"; Teresa De Luca, 19-2: "Deer"; Alison Grace, Baby Sellers; Alison Grace, Motive: "Kiss of Death"; Stein Myhrstad, Motive: "For You I Die"	Dan Hawkes, Mayday: "Into the Eye of the Storm"; Alvin Campaña, Boundless: "Scotland: Charlie Ramsey Round"; Katie Gair, Scam City: "Mumbai"; Andrew Maccormack, Cubicle to the Cage: "The Weight Cut"; Leland Miller, McMorris & McMorris: "Trans-Europe Express"
Editing in a reality or competition program or series
Jonathan Dowler, Allan Manson, Kyle Martin, Seth Poulin and Michael Tersigni, The Amazing Race Canada: "What's It Take to Get a Cup of Tea?"; Jason Cook, Chopped Canada: "One Flew Over the Cocoa's Nest"; Miles Davren and Vitold Vidic, MasterChef Canada: "White Is the New Black"; Curt Lobb, BBQ Crawl: "Georgia Competition"; Jeremy Schaulin-Rioux, Brojects: "Ultimate Hockey Rink"

=== Sound ===
Sound in a comedy, variety or animated or series	Sound in a documentary, factual or lifestyle program or series
Call Me Fitz — Fred Brennan, Alexis Eskandari, Matthew Harrold, Allen Ormerod, Paul Shikata; Juno Awards of 2014 — Simon Bowers, Doug McClement, Mark Vreeken; CMT Presents: The Next Generation — Francesco Russo; God's Greatest Hits — Richard Spence-Thomas, Gary Vaughan; Slugterra: Ghoul from Beyond — Jeff Davis, Ewan Deane, Dean Giammarco, Johnny Ludgate, Fanny Riguidel	Our Man in Tehran — Martin Lee, David McCallum, Sanjay Mehta, Brennan Mercer, Jane Tattersall; 28 Heroes — Ryan Aktari, Steve Blair, Jeremy Kessler, Ian Rodness; Apocalypse: World War I — Gilbert Courtois, Louis Gignac, Christian Rivest; Takedown: The DNA of GSP — Sylvain Brassard, Benoît Dame, Bertrand Duranleau, Isabelle Favreau, Lise Wedlock; The Ghosts in Our Machine — Garrett Kerr, Jason Milligan, Daniel Pelleri
Sound in a dramatic program or series
Vikings — Jane Tattersall, David McCallum, Steve Medeiros, Stephen Muir, Robert Warchol, Martin Lee, Kirk Lynds, Dale Sheldrake, Yuri Gorbachow, Goro Koyama, Andy Malcolm, Daniel Birch; Cracked — Nelson Ferreira, Bruce Fleming, Herwig Gayer, Dustin Harris, Sid Lieberman, Ian Rodness, Kevin Schultz, Russell Walker; Motive — Dean Giammarco, Patrick Haskill, Gord Hillier, Maureen Murphy, Paul Shatto, Bill Sheppard, Gordon Sproule, Graham Timmer; Orphan Black — Tom Bjelic, Herwig Gayer, John Laing, Dale Lennon, Rudy Michael, Stephen Traub, Marilee Yorston; Rogue — Nick Cox, Nigel Edwards, Catherine Hodgson, Jeff Richardson, Tristan Rose

=== Directing ===
Children's or youth	Comedy
Philip Earnshaw, Degrassi: The Next Generation: "Hypnotize"; Neill Fearnley, The Haunting Hour: "Brush with Madness"; Allan Harmon, If I Had Wings; J. J. Johnson, This Is Scarlett and Isaiah: "This Is Isaiah Helping with the First Day of School"; John Payne and Lynn Reist, Franklin and Friends: "Franklin and the Four Seasons"	Don McKellar, Sensitive Skin: "The Return of the Other Davina"; Derek Filiatrault and Sheri Elwood, Call Me Fitz: "A Very Special Fitzmas"; Jason Priestley, Call Me Fitz: "Brotherly Love"; Adam Weissman, Package Deal: "I Love You?"; Steve Wright, Mr. D: "Parent Teacher Night"
Documentary or factual series	Documentary program
Jeff Turner, Wild Canada: The Eternal Frontier"; Alex Craig, McMorris & McMorris: "Trans-Europe Express"; Kevin Eastwood, Emergency Room: Life + Death at VGH: "Full Moon"; Liam O'Rinn, Secrets in the Bones: The Hunt for the Black Death Killer; Peter Waal, Jacked!: "Zap and Lopez"	Drew Taylor and Larry Weinstein, Our Man in Tehran; John Kastner, Out of Mind, Out of Sight; Liz Marshall, The Ghosts in Our Machine; Barry Stevens, Sector Sarajevo; Damon Vignale, The Exhibition
Dramatic program or mini–series	Dramatic series
Peter Moss, The Best Laid Plans; Paul A. Kaufman, Twist of Faith; Tibor Takács, Bunks; Nick Willing, Baby Sellers	T. J. Scott, Orphan Black: "Mingling Its Own Nature with It"; Érik Canuel, 19-2: "Turf"; Thom Fitzgerald, Sex & Violence: "Surface Scars"; Kari Skogland, Vikings: "Blood Eagle"; Stefan Pleszczynski, Motive: "For You I Die"
Lifestyle/practical information program or series	Live sporting event
Marc Simard, Income Property: "Jamie"; Graeme Lynch, Tori & Dean: Cabin Fever: "Coming to Canada"; Jim Morrison IV, You Gotta Eat Here!: "Rock Lobster, Harper's Burger Bar, Casa Calzone"; Frank Samson, ETC Live; Catherine Swing, Colin & Justin's Cabin Pressure: "A New Little Shack in the Woods"	Paul Hemming, 101st Grey Cup; Ron Forsythe, Hockey Night in Canada: "Winter Classic"; Geoff Johnson, Calgary Stampede; Dawn Landis, 100th Canadian Tire National Skating Championships
Reality or competition program or series	Variety or sketch comedy program or series
Rob Brunner, The Amazing Race Canada: "What's It Take to Get a Cup of Tea?"; Dave Bigelow, The Ultimate Fighter: Nations: "With Friends Like These"; Joseph Blasioli and Frank Samson, Canada's Handyman Challenge: "Calgary"; Nicholas Treeshin and Richard Yearwood, Shannon & Sophie: "Sophie Sings the Anthem"	John Keffer, WE Day 2013; Adam Brodie and Dave Derewlany, A Dore to Winnipeg; John Keffer, 2014 MuchMusic Video Awards; Shelagh O'Brien, Just for Laughs Presents: "Whitney Cummings's Bleep Show"; Dave Russell, Juno Awards of 2014
Animated program or series
Matt Ferguson, The Day My Butt Went Psycho!: "I Dream of Deucie" and "Planet of the Butt Monkeys"; Cory Bobiak, Peg+Cat: "The Arch Villain Problem/The Straight and Narrow Problem"; Matthew Fernandes, Yup Yups: "Cannon Ball/Carnival"; Harold Harris, Dinopaws: "The Thing That Fell Down"; Phil Lafrance and Jamie LeClaire, Camp Lakebottom: "Escape from Camp Lakebottom/Rise of the Bottom Dwellers"

=== Music ===
Best Original Music for a Program	Best Original Music for a Series
Robert Carli, Still Life: A Three Pines Mystery; Normand Corbeil, A Fish Story; Rich Walters, Baby Sellers	Trevor Yuile, Orphan Black: "By Means Which Have Never Yet Been Tried"; Robert Carli, Murdoch Mysteries: "Murdoch Ahoy"; James Jandrisch, Signed, Sealed, Delivered: "The Treasure Box"; Shawn Pierce, Haven: "The New Girl"; Ari Posner, 24 Hour Rental: "Through the Looking Glass"
Best Original Music for a Non-Fiction Program or Series
John Welsman, Tales from the Organ Trade; Daryl Bennett, The Exhibition; Antoine Binette Mercier, Takedown: The DNA of GSP; Alex Khaskin, Engraved on a Nation: "The Photograph"; Tobin Stokes and Barnaby Taylor, Wild Canada: "The Eternal Frontier"

=== Writing ===
Children's or youth	Comedy
Matt Huether, Degrassi: The Next Generation: "Unbelievable, Pts. 1 & 2"; Alejandro Alcoba and Carling Tedesco, The Next Step: "Anything You Can Do, I Can Do Better"; Phil Ivanusic, Oh No! It's an Alien Invasion: "Unitron/Dan the Man"; J.J. Johnson and Christin Simms, Dino Dan: "Dinobusters" and "Cowboys vs. Dinosaurs/Survival of the Biggest"; Michael Markus and Tim Stubinski, If I Had Wings	Derek Schreyer, Call Me Fitz: "Baby's First Brothel"; Chris Craddock, Tiny Plastic Men: "The Eye of the Beholder"; Gerry Dee, Mr. D: "Donor Dinner"; Mark Farrell and Joseph Raso, Seed: "Safe Sects"; Jessie Gabe, Mr. D: "Self Defence"
Documentary	Dramatic program or miniseries
Ric Esther Bienstock, Tales from the Organ Trade; Isabelle Clarke and Daniel Costelle, Apocalypse: World War I; Judith Pyke, Doc Zone: "Twin Life: Sharing Mind and Body"; Barry Stevens, Sector Sarajevo; Susan Teskey, Doc Zone: "Defying Putin"	Suzette Couture, Baby Sellers; Susan Coyne and Jason Sherman, The Best Laid Plans; Wayne Grigsby, Still Life: A Three Pines Mystery; Kenneth J. Harvey, The Slattery Street Crockers
Drama series	Lifestyle or reality/competition program or series
Graeme Manson, Orphan Black: "By Means Which Have Never Yet Been Tried"; Thom Fitzgerald, Forgive Me: "Hallowed Be Thy Name"; Graeme Manson and Karen Walton, Orphan Black: "Governed by Sound Reason and True Religion"; Bruce M. Smith, 19-2: "Partners"; Esta Spalding, 19-2: "Islands"	Rob Brunner and Mark Lysakowski, The Amazing Race Canada: "What's It Take to Get a Cup of Tea?"; Chris Charney, The Illegal Eater: "Legume Supper Club & Sous Rising"; Shelley Gunness, Mark Lysakowski and Natalie Schenk, Top Chef Canada: "The Battle of the Sexes"; Les Stroud, Survivorman: "Tierra del Fuego"
Variety or sketch comedy program or series	Animated program or series
Rick Currie, Greg Eckler, Chris Finn, Rick Mercer, Tim Steeves and George Westerholm, Rick Mercer Report; Adam Brodie, Dave Derewlany and Jon Dore, A Dore to Winnipeg; Michael Bublé, Luciano Casimiri and Tim Rykert, Michael Bublé's 3rd Annual Christmas Special; Craig Colby and David Hatch, Cities in Blue: "New York"	Seán Cullen, Rocket Monkeys: "One and a Half Friends"; Mike Kiss, Grojband: "Wish Upon a Jug"; Chris Kratt, Wild Kratts: "Attack of the Alien Tree Eaters"; Andrew Sabiston, Justin Time: "Tower of Justin"; Vito Viscomi, Nerds and Monsters: "Franken-Nerd"

== Digital media ==
Original Interactive Production	Original Program or Series, Fiction
Fort McMoney (Toxa, NFB) David Dufresne, Raphaëlle Huysmans, Philippe Lamarre, Hugues Sweeney; Bramble Berry Tales (Rival Schools) Roy Husada, Betty Kwong, David Lam, Neil McBean, Marilyn Thomas; Circa 1948 (NFB) Loc Dao, Stan Douglas, Kearwood Gilbert, Kelly Richard Fennig; Seven Digital Deadly Sins (The Guardian, NFB) Loc Dao, Jeremy Mendes, Francesca Panetta, Alicia Smith, Pablo Vio	Space Riders: Division Earth; The Amazing Gayl Pile; Guidestones: Sunflower Noir; Out with Dad; Whatever, Linda
Original Program or Series, Non-Fiction	Performance in a Program or Series Produced for Digital Media
A Short History of the Highrise (The New York Times and NFB) — Katerina Cizek, Gerry Flahive, Jacqueline Myint, Jason Spingarn-Koff; Apocalypse 10 Lives (Ideacom International) — Vincent Borel, Félix Larivière, Josette D. Normandeau, Julien (a.k.a. Leeroy Vanilla) Renoult, Louis Vaudeville, Pascale Ysebaert; Coolest Thing I've Ever Made (Coolest Thing Productions Inc.) — Guy Georgeson; The Devil's Toy Redux (NFB) — Dana Dansereau, Loc Dao, Hugues Sweeney; The Transgender Project (Stornoway Communications General Partner Inc) — Kevin O'Keefe	Supinder Wraich, Guidestones: Sunflower Noir; Hannah Cheesman, Whatever, Linda; Fabrizio Filippo, Guidestones: Sunflower Noir; Terra Hazelton, Whatever, Linda; Morgan Waters, The Amazing Gayl Pile
Cross-Platform Project, Fiction	Cross-Platform Project, Non-Fiction
Played: Interference — Ryan Andal, Lisa Collings, Melonie de Guzman, Marty Flanagan, Pietro Gagliano, Janis Lundman, James Milward, Greg Nelson, Chris Skinner, Lindsay Zier-Vogel; Darknet Files — Steve Hoban, Evan Jones, Vincenzo Natali, Jensenne Roculan, Wayne Shipley; The Great Martian War — Ryan Andal, Pietro Gagliano, Michael Kot, Steve Maher, James Milward, Kathryn Rawson; The Heartland Companion App — Amy Cameron, Michael Clarke, Mike Evans, Fergus Heywood, Scott Lepp, Allen Martin, Drick Potvin, Jordy Randall, Eva Riinitze, Tyrone Warner, Zach Zahos	Big Brother Canada Digital — Ryan Andal, Lynne Carter, Michala Duffield, Zach Feldberg, Sean Fernie, Pietro Gagliano, CJ Hervey, Cynthia Long, James Milward, Emily Morgan, Christine Shipton; Battle of the Blades Interactive — Paul McGrath, Matt Odynski, Rose Paton, Kyle Richmond, Jo Vos; CBC Sports: Olympic App — Dan Tavares, Ken Wolff; Juno Tribute Nation — Noora Abu Eitah, Ryan Andal, Matt Burt, Lisa Collings, Melonie de Guzman, Pietro Gagliano, Ashlee Lougheed, James Milward, Chris Skinner; The Wild Canada App — Noora Abu Eitah, Ryan Andal, Annette Bradford, Mike Evans, Pietro Gagliano, Fergus Heywood, Ashlee Lougheed, James MacKinnon, James Milward, Caroline Underwood
Cross-Platform Project, Children's
Grojband: The Show Must Go On - Noora Abu Eitah, Ryan Andal, Pietro Gagliano, Tom McGillis, James Milward; Japanizi! Going, Going, Gong! Interactive - Mark J.W. Bishop, Julie Dutrisac, Matthew Hornburg, Johnny Kalangis, Shelley Simmons; The Next Star: SuperGroup Interactive — Noora Abu Eitah, Ryan Andal, Pietro Gagliano, Andrea Gorfolova, Marc Kell Whitehead, Karina Matkovich, James Milward, Heather Phenix, Mike Rilstone, Mark Suknanan; Time Tremors — Patrick Crowe, Sam White, Alex Mayhew, Dennis Foon; Zerby Derby Interactive — Dorothy Vreeker, Michael McGuigan

== Multiple nominations and awards ==
Films that received multiple nominations
Nominations	Show
13	Mommy
11	Maps to the Stars
7	In Her Place
6	Henri Henri
6	You're Sleeping Nicole (Tu dors Nicole)
5	Fall
5	Meetings with a Young Poet
5	Pompeii

Films that received multiple awards
Awards	Film
9	Mommy
6	Pompeii
2	Maps to the Stars
2	Super Duper Alice Cooper

Shows that received multiple nominations
Nominations	Show
13	Orphan Black
10	19-2
10	Call Me Fitz
10	Mr. D
9	CBC News: The National
8	Motive
7	Baby Sellers
7	W5
6	The Best Laid Plans
6	Sensitive Skin
5	16:9
5	101st Grey Cup
5	2014 Juno Awards
5	Bomb Girls: Facing the Enemy
5	Forgive Me
5	Our Man in Tehran
5	Seed
5	Sex & Violence

Shows that received multiple awards
Awards	Show
10	Orphan Black
5	The Amazing Race Canada
5	Our Man in Tehran
4	Call Me Fitz
4	Degrassi
4	Sensitive Skin
4	Tales from the Organ Trade
3	Bomb Girls: Facing the Enemy
3	Rick Mercer Report
3	Vikings

== Special awards ==
Several special awards were given:

- Board of Directors' Tribute: George Anthony
- Digital Media Trailblazing Award: Jeffrey Elliott
- Earle Grey Award: Paul Gross
- Fan Choice Award: Anna Silk
- Gordon Sinclair Award: Ric Esther Bienstock
- Humanitarian Award: Michael Landsberg
- Icon Award: Insight Productions
- Legacy Award: Toronto International Film Festival
- Margaret Collier Award: Tassie Cameron
