= 2014 in Canadian television =

The following is a list of events affecting Canadian television in 2014. Events listed include television show debuts, finales, cancellations, and channel launches, closures and rebrandings.

== Events ==
=== Notable events ===
==== January ====
Date	Event
1	Corus Entertainment acquires both halves of Historia and Séries+ and fully acquires the remaining half of Teletoon and its sister networks after following an approval by the CRTC on December 20, 2013.

==== March ====
Date	Event
9	The 2nd Canadian Screen Awards airs on CBC.

==== April ====
Date	Event
1	Rogers Media launched a sister network to FX Canada titled FXX based on the American network of the same name.
9	The Canadian Broadcasting Corporation announces another round of cutbacks, eliminating 657 jobs across its properties, cutting back some original programming, and decimating the CBC Sports division, which will no longer compete for professional sports rights.
13	Yoan Garneau wins the second season of La Voix.

==== May ====
Date	Event
8	Jon Pardy wins the second season of Big Brother Canada.

==== July ====
Date	Event
31	DHX Media acquires Family Channel and its sister networks after following an approval by the CRTC on July 24, 2014.

==== August ====
Date	Event
25	TSN will add three additional digital networks to its suite, bringing its total to five. The existing part-time regional sports networks covering the Winnipeg Jets (but not the Montreal Canadiens, who will be replaced by the Ottawa Senators in TSN's lineup, or the Buffalo Sabres) will be integrated into the new TSN channels. but was moved up to August 25 in order to accommodate multiple-court coverage throughout the 2014 US Open.

==== October ====
Date	Event
8	Rogers Media will begin an exclusive 12-year contract to carry National Hockey League games that will see the company broadcast the league's games across its own media outlets and take over operations of the longstanding Hockey Night in Canada program. The Rogers-produced HNIC will continue to air on CBC Television as the CBC gives Rogers six hours of free airtime each week to carry the program.

== Television programs ==
=== Programs debuting in 2014 ===
Series currently listed here have been announced by their respective networks as scheduled to premiere in 2014. Note that shows may be delayed or cancelled by the network between now and their scheduled air dates.

Start date	Show	Channel	Source
January 5	The Best Laid Plans	CBC Television	
January 7	Numb Chucks	YTV	
January 9	Total Drama All-Stars	Teletoon	
January 11	Bitten	Space	
January 16	Packages from Planet X	Teletoon	
January 19	Brave New Girls	E!	
February 8	SNL Québec	Télé-Québec	
February 24	Remedy	Global	
March 6	Spun Out	CTV	
March 12	Working the Engels	Global	
March 13	Wild Canada	CBC	
March 18	Colin and Justin's Cabin Pressure	Cottage Life	
April 16	Unusually Thicke	Slice	
July 20	Sensitive Skin	HBO Canada	
September 1	Kate & Mim-Mim	Knowledge Kids	
September 4	Total Drama Pahkitew Island	Teletoon	
October 6	Strange Empire	CBC	
October 20	Dr. Dimensionpants	Teletoon	
November 23	Mohawk Girls	OMNI/APTN	
TBD	One Night Stand with Annie Sibonney	Discovery World	
TBD	I Wrecked My House	HGTV	
TBD	Nouvelle adresse	Ici Radio-Canada Télé	
TBD	Série noire	Ici Radio-Canada Télé	

=== Programs ending in 2014 ===
End date	Show	Channel	First aired	Status	Source
March 17	Best Recipes Ever	CBC	2010	Cancelled	
March 27	Total Drama All-Stars	Teletoon	2014	Ended	
April 8	Arctic Air	CBC	2012	Cancelled	
July 6	Video on Trial	MuchMusic	2005	Ended	
July 6	The Wedge	MuchMusic	1992	Ended	
August 29	George Stroumboulopoulos Tonight	CBC	2005	Ended	
November 20	Total Drama Pahkitew Island	Teletoon	2014	Ended	
December 10	Republic of Doyle	CBC	2010	Ended	

== Television stations ==
=== Stations changing network affiliation ===
The following is a list of television stations that have made or will make noteworthy network affiliation changes in 2014.

Date	Market	Station	Channel	Prior affiliation	New affiliation	Source
September 1	Thunder Bay, Ontario	CKPR-DT	2.1	CBC Television	CTV	

=== Network launches ===
Network	Type	Launch date	Notes
FXX	Cable and satellite	April 1	

== See also ==
- 2014 in Canada
- List of Canadian films of 2014
