= It Happens Only In India =

Indian TV show

It Happens Only in India is a show featured on the Fox Traveller channel in India. It showcases various cities of India and is hosted by actress Sugandha Garg (formerly hosted by Malishka), who also performs the title song. The show was first aired on the channel in 2009 and is part of the history series Mera India, which has aired various shows over a period of time. In this show, Sugandha gets to talk to various people who give her information about the town she is touring. Actor Abhishek Bachchan also came on the show when the former host, Malishka, was touring Mumbai.
