= Deadly Currents =

- Directed by: Simcha Jacobovici
- Produced by: Simcha Jacobovici; Ric Esther Bienstock; Elliott Halpern
- Starring: Hanan Ashrawi; Nurit Galron; Juliano Mer-Khamis; LT. Kobi Motiv
- Cinematography: Mark Mackay
- Edited by: Steve Weslak
- Music by: Stephen Price
- Production companies: Citytv; Cineplex Odeon; Ontario Film Development Corporation; Telefilm Canada
- Distributed by: Cineplex Odeon Films (Canada); Alliance Films (United States)
- Release date: 4 October 1991
- Running time: 115 minutes
- Country: Canada
- Language: English
- Budget: $1,101,636
- Box office: $130,000

Deadly Currents is a Canadian documentary film, directed by Simcha Jacobovici and released in 1991. The film explores the Israeli–Palestinian conflict, profiling various people on both sides of the dispute.

== Plot ==
The Romans dispersed the Jews from Judaea in 70 AD; Islam became the religion of Palestine 1300 years ago. The film focuses on Gaza and the West Bank where soldiers and youths are caught up in the Intefada, and on the clash of history and ideas in regions to which both peoples have historical claims. The film intersperses in-the-street footage with interviews with academics, journalists, soldiers, artists, family members of prisoners, and victims of violence. With emphasis on the lives of the refugees and settlers, and following a "Golani" platoon of Israeli soldiers led by Lt. Kobi Motiv, the film dramatizes the irreconcilable positions of many on both sides

== Production ==
In 1988, David Green, an Orthodox Jew, spoke to Simcha Jacobovici, an Israeli-born son of Holocaust survivors, about creating a film about the First Intifada. He initially only wanted Jacobovici to write a treatment and Green raised $5,000 for it. Jacobovici wrote a 20-page treatment in one day. Green felt that the media depiction of the conflict was superficial and distorting reality. Elliott Helpern and Ric Esther Bienstock served as producers.

Jacobovici made connections with executives at the Cineplex Odeon Corporation while making Falasha: Exile of the Black Jews. He sent the treatment to executives Jeff Sackman and Robert Topol and both reacted positively, but waited for Garth Drabinsky's reaction before making a commitment. Drabinsky was impressed with the script and gave an advance of $300,000.

The producers filed for funding from Telefilm Canada and Bill House, the head of its Ontario office, praised the treatment as "well written" and "so articulate about the issue". However, they could not receive funding from the theatrical fund due to being a documentary and would instead have to apply for the broadcast fund. 25% of the film's budget had to come from a Canadian broadcaster in order to receive broadcast funding. Sackman took the project to his friend Jay Switzer, head of business affairs at Citytv. Citytv proposed to buy the distribution rights and then sell the theatrical rights to Cineplex-Odeon. The film was delayed as Telefilm studied the legality of this proposal. The process was finished in spring 1989, and Citytv bought the rights for $315,000 before selling the theatrical rights to Cineplex for $275,000.

The production financing for the film was $944,000, with $404,000 coming from Telefilm, $225,000 from the Ontario Film Development Corporation, $290,000 from Cineplex, and $25,000 from Citytv. The film cost $1,101,636.

Jacobovici shot 200,000 feet of film. The producers started raising funds for second unit filming in December 1989, and received an additional $30,000 from Cineplex. Second unit shooting started in August 1990, and lasted six weeks.

Steve Weslak started editing the film on 6 December 1989. Weslak did not read the film's treatment until late into the editing process. The editing process reduced around 100 hours of film to a four hour rough cut by May 1991. Jacobovici requested $69,000 from the OFDC and Telefilm for the film's soundtrack, but they declined and was instead funded by Alliance Films.

== Release ==
The producers initially wanted to show the film at the 1990 Toronto Festival of Festivals, but was delayed until the 1991 festivals. The festival's organizers offered a 400 seat theatre, but Jacobovici instead selected a 800 seat theatre. The venue sold out and an additional 800 people were turned away.

The film was theatrically released in Canada on 4 October 1991, and earned around $100,000. Cineplex promised to release open the film in five American cities with a $100,000 marketing campaign. Alliance served as the sub-agent for Cineplex, but wanted a HBO release rather than a theatrical release. Jacobovici successfully argued for a theatrical release and aided in paying for it. The film opened in New York City on 17 October, and earned $30,000 by the end of its release in 1993. Jacobovici criticized the film's Israeli distributor, Erez Films, for its failure in Israel as they believed "all he has to do is stick it in the theatre".

It had a theatrical run before airing on CBC Television in 1992, which paid $120,000 for the film. The film was sold to the BBC for $30,000, Radio-Québec for $18,000, and TVOntario for $3,000.

== Reception ==
Stephen Holden, writing in The New York Times, praised the film as "an elegantly interwoven sequence of words and images". Newsday gave the film 3.5 stars in its positive review. When the film screened in Jerusalem, it was heavily criticized by viewers on both sides of the dispute.

== Accolades ==
Award	Date of ceremony	Category	Recipient(s)	Result	Ref.
Houston International Festival		Gold Award	Deadly Currents	Won	
Nyon International Documentary Film Festival		Grand Prize	Deadly Currents	Won	
Genie Awards	22 November 1992	Best Feature Length Documentary	Deadly Currents	Won	

== Works cited ==
- Posner, Michael (1993). Canadian Dreams: The Making and Marketing of Independent Films. Canadian Independent Film Caucus. ISBN 1550541145.
