= Simcha Jacobovici =

Canadian–Israeli film director (born 1953)

- 'שמחה יעקובוביץ
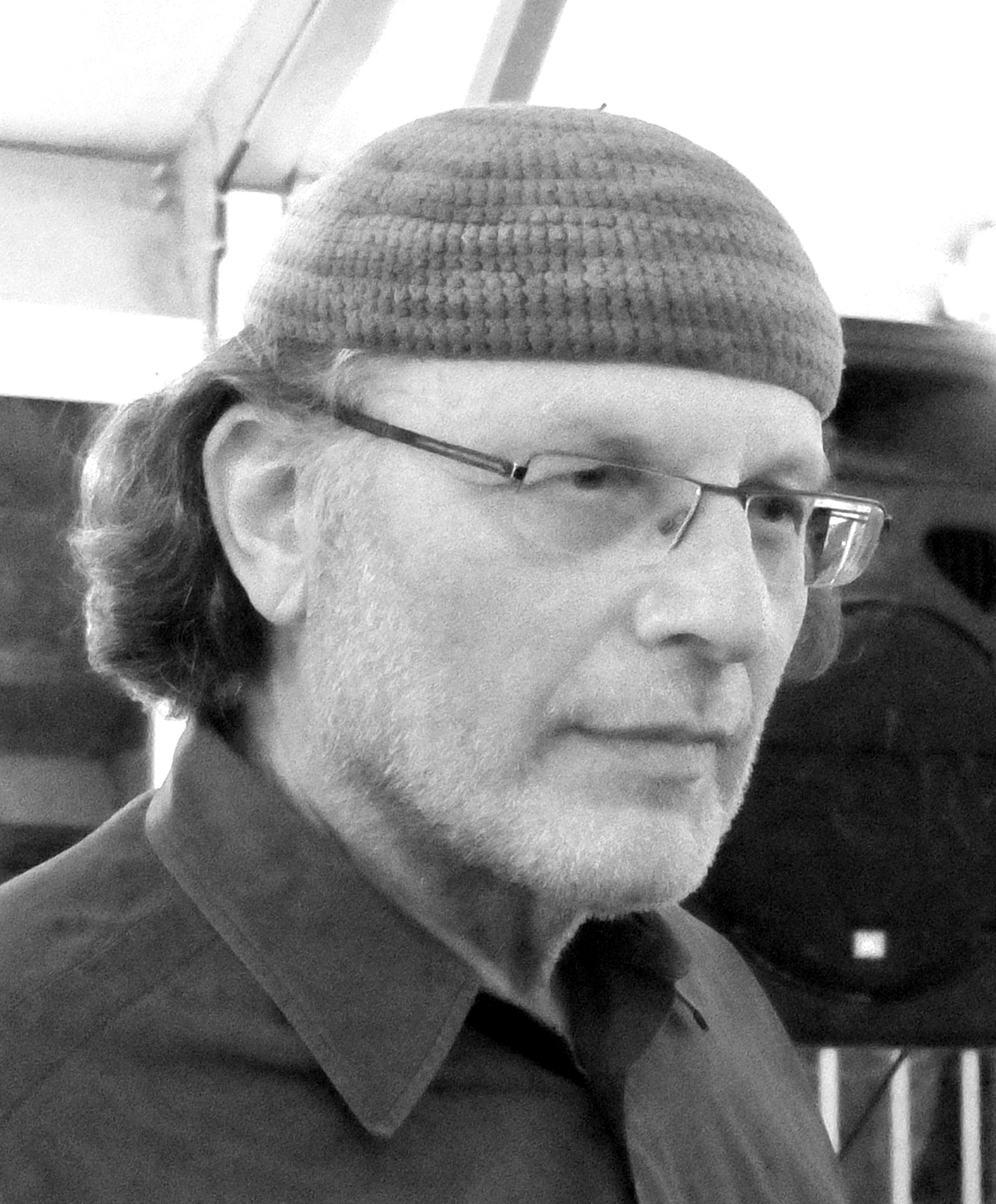
- Jacobovici in 2015
- Born: April 4, 1953 (age 73); Petah Tikva, Israel
- Education: B.A., McGill University; M.A., University of Toronto
- Occupations: Film director, producer, journalist, writer

Simcha Jacobovici (/ˈsɪmxə jəˈkoʊboʊvɪtʃ/; Hebrew: 'שמחה יעקובוביץ; born April 4, 1953) is a Canadian–Israeli journalist, documentary filmmaker and author. He has created documentaries on Israel, biblical history, Atlantis, and the transatlantic slave trade, among other topics. While several scholars consider him to be a pseudo-archeologist and pseudo-historian., the New York Times referred to him as having an “Indiana Jones-ish persona,” noting his dramatic, investigative approach.

== Early life ==
Simcha Jacobovici was born on April 4, 1953, in Petah Tikva, Israel, to a Romanian–Jewish family. His parents were Holocaust survivors from Iași, Romania. His father, Joseph, was on the ship SS Pan Crescent which after attempting to run the British blockade, was intercepted and brought to Cyprus. There, he was interned in one of the camps that the British had set up before the creation of the State of Israel. His mother, Ida, emigrated to Israel in 1951. In 1962, the family relocated to Canada. Jacobovici described himself in a 2012 interview as "totally committed to Judaism and Zionism."

He earned an honours B.A. in Philosophy and Political Science from McGill University and a M.A. in International Relations from the University of Toronto. From 2015 to 2018 he was an Adjunct Professor of Religious Studies at Huntington University, Greater Sudbury, Ontario. As a lecturer, Jacobovici has been a guest speaker at numerous conferences hosted by the Society of Biblical Literature (SBL), the Batchelder Conference for Biblical Archaeology at the University of Nebraska Omaha (UNO), and the Israel Translators Association (ITA).

== Film career ==
=== Israeli and Jewish documentaries (1983–2004) ===
As an early advocate of airlifting Ethiopian Jews to Israel, Jacobovici wrote three op-ed piece on the subject for New York Times and made his first documentary, Falasha: Exile of the Black Jews (1983). The Economist credited Jacobovici's documentary as one of the factors leading to the 1984–85 Israeli airlift of Ethiopian Jews to Israel.

Jacobovici's film on the Arab–Israeli conflict, Deadly Currents (1991), won the Genie Award for Best Documentary, a gold medal at the International Documentary Festival of Nyon, and was the runner-up for the Peace Prize at the 1991 Berlin Film Festival. It was the only documentary screened in both Israeli army bases and Palestinian refugee camps.

In his 1996 documentary Expulsion and Memory: Descendants of the Hidden Jews, Jacobovici investigates the crypto-Jews of New Mexico and tiny populations of Jewish descendants in Spain and Portugal, known as Cristianos nuevos ("new Christians"). He explores the Jewish ancestry of the New Mexican Hispanic families now living in New Mexico and finds that many of them have always been aware of their Jewish heritage.

=== Biblical history and Atlantis documentaries (2006–2017) ===
The Exodus Decoded, a 2006 History Channel documentary, was created by Jacobovici and the producer/director James Cameron. It explores evidence for the biblical account of the Exodus. Its claims and methods were widely criticized by Biblical scholars and mainstream scientists.

The documentary The Lost Tomb of Jesus was co-produced and first broadcast on the Discovery Channel and Vision TV in Canada on March 4, 2007, covering the discovery of the Talpiot Tomb. It was directed by Jacobovici and produced by Felix Golubev and Ric Esther Bienstock, and James Cameron served as executive producer. It was released in conjunction with a book on the same subject, The Jesus Family Tomb, issued in late February 2007 and co-authored by Jacobovici and Charles R. Pellegrino. The book and film make the case that the Talpiot Tomb was the burial place of Jesus of Nazareth, members of his extended family, and several other figures from the New Testament—and, by inference, that Jesus had not risen from the dead as the New Testament describes. This conclusion, while weakly supported by a statistical analysis of the names involved, is rejected by the overwhelming majority of archaeologists, Christian theologians, linguists, and biblical scholars.

Jacobovici was involved as executive producer in the production of a documentary, Finding Atlantis, that was shown in March 2010 on the National Geographic Channel. He claimed that Atlantis had been found in Spain, and he said that evidence which was found by University of Hartford Professor Richard Freund included the unearthed emblem of Atlantis and he also said that "Tarshish is Atlantis itself".

In 2016, Jacobovici directed Atlantis Rising for the National Geographic Channel; its executive producer was James Cameron. It premiered on January 29, 2017, on the National Geographic Channel (US) and at National Geographic Spain as "El Resurgir de la Atlántida" on March 5, 2017.

=== Enslaved series (2020–2022) ===
Working with Samuel L. Jackson and LaTanya Richardson Jackson, in 2020 Jacobovici completed the 6 part series Enslaved: The Lost History of the Transatlantic Slave Trade (CBC, MGM+, BBC, Fremantle) as Showrunner/Series Director. Enslaved is the most comprehensive television series ever made on the subject. It uses a modern day quest for sunken slave ships as the springboard to the larger narrative.

Enslaved has been broadcast in 150 countries garnering record ratings and outstanding reviews. Enslaved was nominated for two NAACP Image Awards, including Best Director and Series and won three Canadian Screen Awards. It won a "Buzzie" for Best Historical Series at the World Congress of Science and Factual Producers. Enslaved was also honored for Outstanding Achievement by the Impact Doc Awards and was named Best Documentary at the International Filmmaker Festival in London. As part of their anti-racism campaign, Enslaved has been screened in the United Nations and the European Parliament. Paris Match has called Enslaved "One small step for man…One giant leap for civil rights!"

Jacobovici's 2022 book, Enslaved: The Sunken History of the Transatlantic Slave Trade, written with Sean Kingsley, with a preface by Brenda Jones, was published by Pegasus in New York and distributed by Simon & Schuster.

=== Other work (2022–present) ===
At present, Simcha appears on a YouTube channel entitled “Simcha Sessions” where he provides his perspective on history, religion and politics.

=== Film awards ===
Jacobovici is a three-time Emmy winner for Outstanding Investigative Journalism. His filmmaking awards include a Certificate of Special Merit from the Academy of Motion Picture Arts and Sciences, a Gold Medal from the International Documentary Festival of Nyon, two US CableACE Awards, a Royal Television Society Award, two Gemini Awards, an Alfred I. duPont–Columbia University Award, two Gold Dolphins from the Cannes Corporate Media & TV Awards, a Jack R. Howard Award from the Scripps Howard Awards for In-Depth National and International Coverage, the Norman Bethune Award from the Canadian Medical Association for Excellence in International Health Reporting and, from the Overseas Press Club of America, two Edward R. Murrow Awards and a Carl Spielvogel Award.

In 2017, he was awarded the Gordon Sinclair Award, Canada's highest achievement in Broadcast Journalism, from the Academy of Canadian Cinema and Television.

== Charitable work ==
Jacobovici has been involved in several not-for-profit organizations. From 1978-1980, he was the Chairperson of the North American Jewish Students’ Network, the then union of Jewish students in North America. In 1984, along with Dr. Mark Doidge and Henry Gold, he founded Canadian Physicians for Aid and Relief in response to the extreme famine and critical health crisis faced by Ethiopian refugees in Sudan. Today, CPAR is one of Canada’s major non-governmental organizations providing integrated development in Africa.

== Controversies ==
Several of Jacobovici's films have sparked controversies. The 1994 film The Plague Monkeys resulted in the closure of a level 4 lab in Toronto, Canada. James, Brother of Jesus highlighted an ossuary in the private collection of an Israeli antiquities collector, Oded Golan. Golan was accused of forging part of the inscription on a 2,000-year-old ossuary. Jacobovici and Hershel Shanks (founding editor of Biblical Archaeology Review), stood by their story. In 2012, after seven years in an Israeli court, Golan was acquitted of fraud, though it did not rule on whether the ossuary was a forgery.

Jacobovici's most controversial claim is the identification of a tomb in Jerusalem as that of Jesus of Nazareth and his family in the Talpiot Tomb. In 2008, a conference made up of renowned scholars took place in Jerusalem to discuss the thesis of Jacobovici’s film. By the end, a minority of scholars backed the thesis, another minority rejected it and the majority argued that the subject has to be studied further. The proceedings of the conference were published by James H. Charlesworth under the name The Tomb of Jesus and His Family? Exploring Ancient Jewish Tombs Near Jerusalem’s Walls (2013).

== Investigative archaeology ==
Over the past decades, Jacobovici has engaged in what he calls "Investigative Archaeology".

In 2012, Jacobovici investigated a Second Temple-era burial cave in Armon Hanatziv with a camera mounted on a robotic arm. Along with James Tabor, he claimed that the 2,000-year-old cave may be the burial site of disciples of Jesus. Such identification has been rejected by many scholars and supported by some.

Jacobovici hosted three seasons of The Naked Archaeologist on VisionTV in Canada and The History Channel in the United States. In 2013, the series began to be broadcast on the Israel Broadcast Authority (IBA) Channel 1. The series can be streamed on Amazon and YouTube. In May 2024, Jacobovici announced that a 10-episode reboot of the series was green-lit and was entering pre-production.

Jacobovici has written analysis pieces for The New York Times, International Herald Tribune, The Globe and Mail, Los Angeles Times and other newspapers. At times, he blogs on SimchaJTV, The Times of Israel, The Jerusalem Post and The Huffington Post. Jacobovici has been interviewed on numerous television shows like Anderson Cooper 360, Larry King Live, ABC Nightline, The Oprah Winfrey Show, NBC Today Show and ABC Good Morning America.

== Books ==
- Jacobovici, Simcha; Kingsley, Sean (October 2022). Enslaved: The Sunken History of the Transatlantic Slave Trade. New York: Pegasus. ISBN 9781639362387.
- Jacobovici, Simcha; Wilson, Barrie (November 2014). The Lost Gospel: Decoding the Ancient Text that Reveals Jesus' Marriage to Mary the Magdalene. New York: Pegasus. ISBN 978-1605986104.
- Jacobovici, Simcha; Tabor, James D. (January 2012). The Jesus Discovery: The New Archaeological Find That Reveals the Birth of Christianity. New York: Simon & Schuster. ISBN 978-1-4516-5040-2.
- Jacobovici, Simcha; Pellegrino, Charles (March 2007). The Jesus Family Tomb: The Discovery, the Investigation, and the Evidence That Could Change History. New York: HarperCollins. ISBN 978-0-06-125299-0.

Jacobovici is also the co-author of two e-books; "Michelangelo's Angels and Demons" and "The James Revelation", published by Zoomerbooks, as a companion to his television series "Biblical Conspiracies".

== Filmography ==
=== Director ===
- Enslaved: The Lost History of the Transatlantic Slave Trade (MGM+, CBC, Fremantle, 2020)
- Atlantis Rising (National Geographic/Discovery, 2017)
- Bride of God (Science Channel/VisionTV, 2014)
- The Jesus Discovery/The Resurrection Tomb Mystery (2012)
- Secrets of Christianity/Decoding the Ancients (2010)
- The Lost Tomb of Jesus (2007)
- Charging the Rhino (2007)
- The Naked Archaeologist (2006–2010)
- The Exodus Decoded (2005)
- James, Brother of Jesus (2003)
- The Struma (2001)
- Quest for the Lost Tribes (1998)
- Hollywoodism: Jews, Movies & the American Dream (1997)
- Expulsion and Memory: Descendants of the Hidden Jews (1996)
- Bones of Contention (1993)
- Deadly Currents (1991)
- Falasha: Exile of the Black Jews (1983)

=== Producer ===
- Enslaved: The Lost History of the Transatlantic Slave Trade (2020)
- The Good Nazi (2019)
- Tales from the Organ Trade (2013)
- Living in the Time of Jesus (2010)
- Yummy Mummy (2005)
- Sex Slaves/The Real Sex Traffic (2005)
- Impact of Terror (2004)
- Tell It Like It Is (2003/04)
- Penn & Teller’s Magic and Mystery Tour (2000)
- Pandemic: Case of the Killer Flu (1999)
- Frozen Hearts (1999)
- Jesus in Russia: An American Holy War (1996)
- The Selling of Innocents (1996)
- Ebola: Inside an Outbreak/The Plague Fighters (1996)
- The Plague Monkeys (1994)
- Bones of Contention (1993)
- AIDS in Africa (1990)
