= Seven deadly sins (disambiguation) =

The seven deadly sins is a classification of vices used in Christian teachings.

Seven deadly sins may also refer to:

== Art ==
- The Seven Deadly Sins and the Four Last Things, a 1485 painting by Hieronymus Bosch
- The Seven Deadly Sins of Modern Times, a 1993 painting by Susan Dorothea White

== Books ==
- Seven Deadly Sins, a 1992 book by William S. Burroughs
- Seven Deadly Sins (novel series), a 2005–2007 book series by Robin Wasserman
- Seven Deadly Sins, a 2010 book by vocalist Corey Taylor of the band Slipknot
- The Seven Deadly Sins (manga), a 2012 manga series
- Seven Deadly Sins: My Pursuit of Lance Armstrong, a 2012 book by journalist David Walsh
- The Seven Deadly Sins (play), a two-part play written c. 1585, attributed to Richard Tarlton

== Film, television and theatre ==
=== Films ===
- Les sept péchés capitaux ("The Seven Deadly Sins"), a 1992 Belgian sketch comedy film including a segment directed by Beatriz Flores Silva
- The Seven Deadly Sins (1952 film), a French/Italian film
- The Seven Deadly Sins (1962 film), a French film
- 7 Deadly Sins (film) (2019), a horror film directed by Glenn Plummer, originally titled Charlie Charlie

=== Television ===
- Seven Deadly Sins (dance films), a 1993 series of short films featuring dances by leading Australian choreographers, made for TV
- Seven Deadly Sins (miniseries), a 1993 Australian TV drama anthology series
- Seven Deadly Sins, a 2008–2009 History Channel series
- "Seven Deadly Sins" (Blossom), a 1994 television episode
- The Seven Deadly Sins (2014 TV series), anime television series based on a Japanese fantasy manga

=== Theatre ===
- The Seven Deadly Sins (ballet chanté), ballet by Kurt Weill, Bertolt Brecht, and George Balanchine

== Music ==
- The Seven Deadly Sins (ballet chanté), a 1933 ballet chanté by Kurt Weill, Bertolt Brecht, and George Balanchine

=== Albums ===
- The Seven Deadly Sins (album), a 1998 album by Marianne Faithfull
- The Seven Deadly Sins (Necrodeath album), a 2014 album by Necrodeath

=== Songs ===
- "7 Deadly Sins", a 1990 song by the Traveling Wilburys from the album Traveling Wilburys Vol. 3
- "The Seven Deadly Sins", an Irish folk song on several albums by The Dubliners
- "The Seven Deadly Sins", a 2004 song by Flogging Molly from Within a Mile of Home
- Seventh Deadly Sin, an album by Ice T
- "Seven Deadly Sins", a 1987 song by Bryan Ferry from Bête Noire
- "Seven Deadly Sins", a 2015 song by Man with a Mission, featured in the anime series with the same name
- "Seven Deadly Sins", a 2003 song by DJ Kay Slay from The Streetsweeper, Vol. 1

== Other uses ==
- Seven Deadly Sins, a series of dolls in the Living Dead Dolls line

== See also ==
- Deadly Sins (disambiguation)
- Seven sins (disambiguation)
- The Magnificent Seven Deadly Sins, a 1971 comedy film
- Original Sin – The Seven Sins (2021 film)
- Seven Digital Deadly Sins, a 2014 Canadian web documentary
- Seven Mortal Sins, also known as Sin: The 7 Deadly Sins a 2017 Japanese anime adaptation of a media franchise by Hobby Japan
