= Deadly Sins =

Deadly Sins may refer to:

- Seven deadly sins, Christian classification of vices
- Deadly Sins (album), 2007 Seven Witches album
- Deadly Sins (film), 1995 American slasher film
- Deadly Sins (TV series), American TV series, 2012 debut

== See also ==
- Seven deadly sins (disambiguation)
