= The Naked Archaeologist =

Canadian television series

- Starring: Simcha Jacobovici
- Country of origin: Canada
- Original language: English
- No. of episodes: 65

Production
- Running time: 30 minutes (with commercials)

Original release
- Network: VisionTV; History International
- Release: 2005 – 2010

The Naked Archaeologist is a television series on VisionTV in Canada and History International in the US, that was produced and hosted by the Emmy Award–winning journalist Simcha Jacobovici. There is also an Israeli version, broadcast on Channel 8 (Israel), that was co-hosted by Avri Gilad. The show examines biblical stories and tries to find proof for them by exploring the Holy Land looking for archaeological evidence, personal inferences, deductions, and interviews with scholars and experts.

Subsequent to its original run on VisionTV, it was picked up in the U.S. by The History Channel and its sister network, History International.

The third and final season aired on Vision TV starting from March 22, 2010, and subsequently on History International from November 8, 2010.

== Episodes ==
=== Season 1 (2005) ===
1. "Delilah's People" (5 September 2005)
2. "Who Invented the Alphabet?" (12 September 2005)
3. "Jerusalem & The Black Prince" (19 September 2005)
4. "What Killed Herod?" (26 September 2005)
5. "Real or Fake?" (3 October 2005)
6. "Fame & Forgery?" (10 October 2005)
7. "Accidental Archaeology" (17 October 2005)
8. "Biblical Food" (24 October 2005)
9. "Jesus: The Early Years" (31 October 2005)
10. "John the Baptist" (7 November 2005)
11. "True Blue" (14 November 2005) concerning tekhelet
12. "Return of the Hilazon" (21 November 2005)
13. "Last Man Standing" (28 November 2005)
14. "Crucifixion" (5 December 2005)
15. "King David" (12 December 2005)
16. "Jezebel: Bible Bad Girl" (19 December 2005)
17. "The Oldest Leper" (26 December 2005)
18. "Joshua" (2 January 2006)
19. "Masada" (9 January 2006)
20. "Who Wrote the Dead Sea Scrolls?" (16 January 2006)
21. "Holy Hot Spot" (23 January 2006)
22. "Biblical Epicentre - Temple Mount" (30 January 2006)
23. "The Mother of Archaeology - St. Helena" (6 February 2006)
24. "Who Wrote the Bible?" (13 February 2006)
25. "Where is Mount Sinai?" (20 February 2006)
26. "The Real Mount Sinai" (27 February 2006)

=== Season 2 (2008) ===
1. "The Would-be Messiah" (16 May 2008)
2. "The Search for St. Peter" (History Channel International: 23 May 2008)
3. "A Nabatean By Any Other Name" (History Channel International: 30 May 2008)
4. "Chasing the Temple Booty – Part One" (History Channel International: 5 May 2008)
5. "Chasing the Temple Booty – Part Two" (History Channel International: 5 May 2008)
6. "The Legacy of King Solomon – Part 1" (History Channel International: 21 May 2008)
7. "The Legacy of King Solomon – Part 2" (History Channel International: 2008)
8. "Decoding Ezekiel's Vision" (History Channel International: 11 June 2008)
9. "Jewish Rome" (History Channel International: 18 June 2008)
10. "The Giants of Genesis" (History Channel International: 20 June 2008)
11. "All in the Family" (History Channel International: 2008)
12. "The Curse of the Macabee Tomb " (History Channel International: Fall 2008)
13. "The Search for King David's Harp " (History Channel International: Fall 2008)
14. "Hangin' with Judas " (History Channel International: Fall 2008)
15. "The Miracle Workers of Galilee" (History Channel International: 17 September 2008)
16. "The Collector" (History Channel International: 24 September 2008)
17. "Cleanliness is Next to Godliness" (History Channel International: 1 October 2008)
18. "What Happened to the JC Bunch? Part 1" (History Channel International: 8 October 2008)
19. "What Happened to the JC Bunch? Part 2: Tracking the Tribe" (History Channel International: 8 October 2008)
20. "What Happened to the JC Bunch? Part 3: The Early Christian Underground" (History Channel International: 15 October 2008)
21. "Babes, Brothels and Baths" (History Channel International: 22 October 2008)
22. "The Beloved Disciple" (History Channel International: 29 October 2008)
23. "Who Were the Danites" (History Channel International: 5 November 2008)
24. "Coat of Many Colors" (History Channel International: 12 November 2008)
25. "Bilaam: The Story of a Talking Donkey" (History Channel International: 10 December 2008)
26. "Holy Threads" (History Channel International: 24 December 2008)

Note: Episodes 4 and 5 were originally intended to be aired on June 6 and June 13, respectively, but were aired early, on May 5, in honor of Israel's 60th anniversary.

=== Season 3 (2010) ===
1. "Moses vs Akhenaten" (US premiere: 8 November 2010 (History Channel International))
2. "Ancient Glass" (US premiere: 9 November 2010 (History Channel International))
3. "Biblical Beauty Secrets" (US premiere: 10 November 2010 (History Channel International))
4. "The Bath That Changed History" (US premiere: 11 November 2010 (History Channel International))
5. "The Hairy Show" (US premiere: 12 November 2010 (History Channel International))
6. "Rebuilding the Temple" (US premiere: 15 November 2010 (History Channel International))
7. "Gone Fishing" (US premiere: 16 November 2010 (History Channel International))
8. "Naked Letters" (US premiere: 17 November 2010 (History Channel International))
9. "Lilith: Queen of the Night" (US premiere: 18 November 2010 (History Channel International))
10. "Bethsaida and the Cross" (US premiere: 19 November 2010 (History Channel International))
11. "Queen Esther and Purim" (US premiere: 22 November 2010 (History Channel International))
12. "Apostles & Spies, Part 1" (US premiere: 23 November 2010 (History Channel International))
13. "Apostles & Spies, Part 2" (US premiere: 24 November 2010 (History Channel International))

Note: Season 3 originally aired in Canada on VisionTV in March 2010.

== Awards ==
- The episode "A Nabatean by Any Other Name" won the Special Jury Prize at the 8th International Archaeological Film Festival in Brussels.
- Gold Worldmedal, New York Festivals
- Silver Plaque, Chicago International Television Awards
- HUGO TV Awards, Certificate of Merit Special Achievement: Concept

== Nominations ==
- Most Innovative Program, History Makers Awards
- Gemini Award for Best Host or Interviewer in a General/Human Interest or Talk Program or Series for Simcha Jacobovici
- Gemini Award for Best Visual Research
- Golden Sheaf Award, Yorkton Film Festival

== See also ==
- Simcha Jacobovici
