= Narmada: A Valley Rises =

1994 Canadian documentary film

- Directed by: Ali Kazimi
- Written by: Ali Kazimi
- Produced by: Ali Kazimi
- Cinematography: Ali Kazimi
- Edited by: Steve Weslak
- Music by: Mychael Danna
- Production company: Peripheral Visions
- Release date: September 1994 (TIFF)
- Running time: 87 minutes
- Country: Canada
- Language: English

Narmada: A Valley Rises is a Canadian documentary film, directed by Ali Kazimi and released in 1994. The film documents the activist campaign of Narmada Bachao Andolan against the then-proposed Narmada Dam project in Gujarat, India, including a 200-kilometre protest march by over 6,000 people that followed Gandhi's principles of non-violent resistance.

The film premiered in the Perspectives Canada program at the 1994 Toronto International Film Festival. It was subsequently screened at the Hot Docs Canadian International Documentary Festival in 1995, where it won the award for Best Political Documentary and Kazimi won the award for Best Direction. It received television broadcasts in 1995, both on Vision TV and as an episode of the CBC Television documentary series The Passionate Eye.

The film received a Genie Award nomination for Best Feature Length Documentary at the 16th Genie Awards in 1996.
