= Seven sins =

Seven sins may refer to:

- The seven deadly sins, a classification of vices used in early Christian teachings
- Seven Sins of Medicine, a perspective of medical ethics
- The Seven Sins of Memory, a 2001 book by psychologist Daniel Schacter
- 7 Sins (video game), a video game
- 7 Sins, a 1996 album by Kane & Abel
- Seven Sins, a soap opera starring Marcelo Novaes

== See also ==
- 7 Sinners, a 2010 album by Helloween
- Haft-sin, an arrangement of seven symbolic items names start with the Persian letter "س" pronounced as "seen"
- Seven deadly sins (disambiguation)
