= Quest for the Lost Tribes =

1998 Canadian documentary film

- Directed by: Simcha Jacobovici
- Written by: Simcha Jacobovici
- Produced by: Simcha Jacobovici; Elliott Halpern
- Cinematography: Mark Mackay
- Edited by: Reid Dennison
- Music by: Aaron Davis; John Lang
- Production company: Associated Producers
- Distributed by: A+E Networks; Alliance Atlantis Communications; Canadian Broadcasting Corporation
- Release date: November 22, 1998 (John Bassett Theatre)
- Running time: 100 minutes
- Country: Canada
- Language: English

Quest for the Lost Tribes is a Canadian documentary film, directed by Simcha Jacobovici and released in 1998. The film documents their travels to various places in Africa and Asia, to investigate various claims that local populations are the purported Ten Lost Tribes of Israel.

The film premiered at the John Bassett Theatre in Toronto on November 22, 1998. It received various theatrical screenings through 1999, before being broadcast by CBC Television in Canada and A&E in the United States in 2000.

The film received a Genie Award nomination for Best Feature Length Documentary at the 20th Genie Awards in 2000.
