= From Spain with Love with Annie Sibonney =

- Created by: Annie Sibonney; Dale Burshtein; Henry Less
- Presented by: Annie Sibonney
- Country of origin: Canada
- Original language: English
- No. of series: 1

Production
- Producer: Dale Burshtein
- Production company: Shaftesbury Films

From Spain With Love with Annie Sibonney is a Canadian reality television series, which aired on Food Network in Canada and the Cooking Channel in the United States. Produced by Shaftesbury Films, the series premiered in 2011.

Hosted by Toronto-based broadcaster and culinary tour operator Annie Sibonney, the series profiles the cuisine of Spain.

The series also aired on Food Network in Europe, LifeStyle Food in Australia, Asian Food Channel in Southeast Asia and Fox Life India.

After the end of the program's run, Sibonney created the new series One Night Stand with Annie Sibonney.

== Restaurants featured ==
- Chikito
- Cinc Sentits
- El fogón de Trifón
