= Steve Weslak =

Canadian film editor

- Born: May 13, 1947 (age 77)
- Occupation: film editor

Steve Weslak (born May 13, 1947) is a Canadian film editor. He is most noted as a Canadian Screen Award winner for Best Picture Editing in a Documentary Program or Factual Series at the 3rd Canadian Screen Awards for his work on the documentary film Our Man in Tehran.

His other editing credits include The Last Chase (1981), The Care Bears Movie (1985), Deadly Currents (1991), Narmada: A Valley Rises (1994), Helen's War (2004), The Climb (2007) and Tales from the Organ Trade (2013).

He received Gemini Award nominations for editing at the 9th Gemini Awards in 1995 for Lawn and Order, the 11th Gemini Awards in 1997 for Ebola: Inside an Outbreak, the 13th Gemini Awards in 1998 for The Game of Her Life and the 25th Gemini Awards in 2010 for Empire of the Word: Forbidden Reading, and a Canadian Screen Award nomination at the 10th Canadian Screen Awards in 2022 for Gangster's Gold.

He is a member of the Canadian Cinema Editors honours society, and was the winner of the organization's lifetime achievement award in 2018.
