= Sex Slaves (film) =

2005 Canadian television film

- Written by: Ric Esther Bienstock
- Directed by: Ric Esther Bienstock
- Narrated by: Ric Esther Bienstock
- Country of origin: Canada

Production
- Running time: 89 minutes

Original release
- Release: 2005

Sex Slaves (also Sex Slave$) is a 2005 documentary film by Ric Esther Bienstock that was produced in association with CBC, Frontline (PBS), Channel 4 and Canal D.

== Genesis and Background ==
It provides a firsthand account of international human trafficking by exploring the Eastern European countries such as Moldova and Ukraine where girls are recruited, then following the trail to the various countries and locales where they end up. Interviews with traffickers, experts, police vice-squads and former sex slaves, along with undercover footage, provide a glimpse into the frightening reality and scope of the problem.

== Plot ==
One husband's journey is documented as he attempts to rescue his pregnant wife who was sold by a trafficker who befriended them, to a notoriously powerful and violent pimp in Turkey.

== Awards and Accolades ==
Sex Slaves won numerous awards, including a 2007 Emmy Award for Outstanding Investigative Journalism, the Edward R. Murrow Award from the Overseas Press Club of America, a Gracie Award from American Women in Radio and Television, a British Broadcast Award for Best Documentary. a Royal Television Society Award from the UK and a BAFTA nomination, among others.

== See also ==
- Sexual slavery
- Trafficking in human beings
