= The Neighbors Dog =

Canadian television series

The Neighbors Dog is a Canadian music performance television series, which premiered on SCN in 2009. Created by Darryl Kessler and John Mills of Plan 9 Films, the series featured musicians performing private house concerts in Saskatoon, Saskatchewan.

The show aired three seasons before SCN was acquired by Rogers Sports & Media and rebranded as Citytv Saskatchewan, and returned for one further season as a Citytv program. In the Citytv season, the show's length expanded from a half-hour to a full hour, with the format transitioning from an entirely performance-based show to one that mixed both performance clips and interview segments.

Kessler received a Canadian Screen Award nomination for Best Photography in a Variety or Sketch Comedy Program or Series at the 3rd Canadian Screen Awards in 2015, for the fourth season episode featuring Daniel Romano.

== Performers ==
=== Season 1 ===
- Luke Doucet and Melissa McClelland (Note: these musicians later formed the band Whitehorse, but were billed as individuals, not yet as Whitehorse, at the time of this concert.)
- Stephen Fearing
- Don Freed
- Little Miss Higgins
- John Mann
- Nathan
- Jason Plumb
- Bob Snider
- Leeroy Stagger
- Suzie Vinnick
- WiL
- Tom Wilson
- Bob Wiseman

=== Season 2 ===
- Rose Cousins
- Alex Cuba
- Amelia Curran
- The Deep Dark Woods
- Jenn Grant
- Great Lake Swimmers
- Ron Hawkins
- Library Voices
- Danny Michel
- The Sadies
- The Sheepdogs
- Jane Siberry
- Royal Wood

=== Season 3 ===
- 54-40
- Jill Barber
- The Besnard Lakes
- Blackie and the Rodeo Kings
- Buck 65
- Cowboy Junkies
- Julie Doiron
- Elliott Brood
- The Low Anthem
- Ohbijou
- Sarah Slean
- The Wooden Sky
- Zeus

=== Season 4 ===
- Hannah Georgas
- The Grapes of Wrath
- Odds
- Rah Rah
- Daniel Romano
- Yukon Blonde
