= John Minh Tran =

Canadian cinematographer

John Minh Tran is a Canadian cinematographer. He is most noted as a two-time winner of the Canadian Screen Award for Best Photography in a Documentary Program or Factual Series, winning at the 3rd Canadian Screen Awards in 2015 for Our Man in Tehran and at the 10th Canadian Screen Awards in 2022 for Borealis.
