= Marinoni: The Fire in the Frame =

- Film poster
- Directed by: Tony Girardin
- Written by: Tony Girardin
- Produced by: Tony Girardin; Noah Couture-Glassco
- Starring: Giuseppe Marinoni
- Cinematography: Tony Girardin
- Edited by: Tony Girardin
- Music by: Alexander Hackett
- Production company: Tekno Hut
- Release date: March 28, 2015
- Running time: 90 minutes
- Country: Canada
- Language: English

Marinoni: The Fire in the Frame is a Canadian documentary film, directed by Tony Girardin and premiered in 2014. The film profiles Giuseppe Marinoni, a former competitive cyclist turned bicycle manufacturer who at age 75 is attempting to set a new cycling time record for his age bracket. As a secondary storyline, the film also focuses on Marinoni's longtime friendship with champion cyclist Jocelyn Lovell. He raced on a Marinoni bike until his career ended when a motorist drove their dump truck into him, leaving Lovell a quadriplegic.

The film premiered at the Hot Docs Canadian International Film Festival in 2014.

The film received two Canadian Screen Award nominations, for Best Feature Length Documentary and Best Editing in a Documentary, at the 3rd Canadian Screen Awards in 2015.
