= United States–China Economic and Security Review Commission =

Independent agency of the United States government

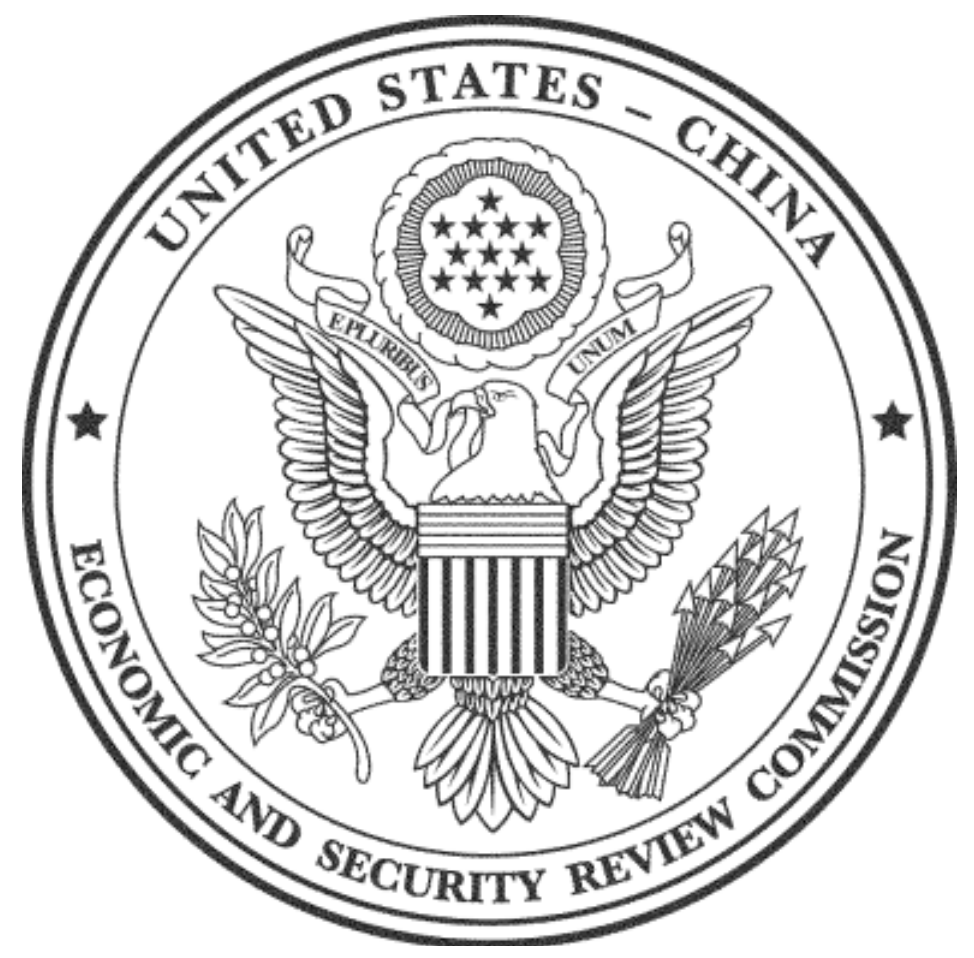

Congressional commission overview
- Formed: October 30, 2000; 25 years ago
- Jurisdiction: United States federal government
- Headquarters: Washington, D.C.
- Congressional commission executives: Reva Price, Chairman; Mike Castellano, Executive Director
- Website: www.uscc.gov

The United States–China Economic and Security Review Commission (informally, the U.S.–China Commission, USCC) is an independent commission of the United States government legislative branch. It was established on October 30, 2000, through the Floyd D. Spence National Defense Authorization Act.

The USCC is responsible for providing recommendations to Congress based on their findings on bilateral trade with the People's Republic of China, evaluating national security and trading risks in all industries and conducting research on China's actions. All these findings are discussed in their hearings, and submitted in an annual report or other published research throughout the year.

The USCC directly reports to Congress—it is not a part of any other department or agency in the federal government. The USCC consists of 12 commissioners, a non-partisan staff, and facilities that were absorbed from the former U.S. Trade Deficit Review Commission. The commissioners are appointed to two-year terms by the majority and minority leaders of the U.S. Senate, and by the speaker and minority leader of the U.S. House of Representatives. Each commissioner is entitled to one vote.

== History ==
The USCC staff and facilities are from former U.S. Trade Deficit Review Commission by the Floyd D. Spence National Defense Authorization Act of 2001. Since then, the USCC is responsible for overseeing trade deficit matters with China.

One reason the USCC was created was the U.S. government's belief that some of the current trades with China were in need of urgent attentions and corrections based on analyses, considering China's military modernizations, change of trade policy and media and information controls. The creation of the USCC (along with the Congressional-Executive Commission on China) was also a concession to political forces skeptical of China in order to obtain further support for permanent normal trade relations with China upon its accession to the World Trade Organization.

Its first annual report in 2002 found that China is and will be a major competitor of the U.S. and also concluded that China as the third-largest trading partner had extremely unbalanced trade relationship. In the following years between 2004 and 2009, the USCC stated that China's undervalued currency, counterfeiting and piracy, export subsidies and lack of protection of U.S. intellectual property rights were continually contributed to a growing trade deficit.

The main focus for the commission is constantly changing around the eight main areas. However, the focused area from 2010 to 2020 was national security.

In the 2020 annual report, the commission stated 10 keys recommendations but many of them are related to security versus purely economic-centered. The USCC argues the main direction of China–United States relations will be a "combination of containment and engagement". In its 2023 annual report, the USCC stated that "China now appears to view diplomacy with the United States primarily as a tool for forestalling and delaying U.S. pressure over a period of years while China moves ever further down the path of developing its own economic, military, and technological capabilities."

== Function ==
=== Annual report ===
The commission is required by Congress to submit an annual report by December 1 every year. The USCC fulfills its mission by holding regular meetings with commission members to discuss recent related matters include write full analysis of eight focused parts, which are energy, U.S. capital market, economic transfers, regional economics and security impacts, U.S.–China bilateral programs, weapon proliferation, World Trade Organization compliance and implications of restrictions on speech and information access in China. And provide conclusions and recommendations for legislative and administrative actions.

The public annual report can be download and accessed by the general public. The USCC provided its first annual report to Congress in 2002 and did not provide report in 2003. However, 7 research papers were provided in 2003. 18 annual reports were submitted until 2020 so far.

=== Hearing ===
Multiple hearings are held every year with commissioners and outside government parties to discuss relevant matters. The first hearing was "China Trade/Sectoral and WTO Issues" on June 14, 2001. The latest hearing was held on April 15, 2021, the topic was "An Assessment of the CCP's Economic Ambitions, Plans, and Metrics of Success".

=== Research ===
Specific research topics are choosing according to the need of congress and popularity among general public, topics can be varying such as economics, trade, technology, military and security.

The latest research is "China's Health System" in 2021, a few popular research papers are "China's Corporate Social Credit System" in 2020 and "China's Internet of Things" in 2018. Those research papers can be parts of the annual reports.

The USCC also entitled to access any information from the United States Department of Defense, the Central Intelligence Agency and any other federal departments that the commission considers necessary to carry out its duties. Also, government staff including the speakers of Congress, senior federal members and people from military, security, industry and academia who are relevant to the hearings must cooperate with the USCC and attend to the hearings.

== Structure ==
The USCC consists of 12 commission members and roughly 20 staff. Members have the same responsibility as the Trade Deficit Review Commission. Each commission members are appointed to a two-year term by the speaker of the House, after consulting with majority of U.S. Senate's leaders. Members are not later than 30 days after the date on which each new Congress convenes, and may be reappointed for other additional terms. Each member is entitled to one vote for decision-making and voting matters. Members must be U.S. citizens and have expertise in national security and U.S.–China relations. Members are political appointees, but not members of Congress.

USCC members comprise a commission chairman, vice chairman and ten other members. The chair and vice chair are selected from among twelve members by equal voting.

=== Current Commissioners ===
- Reva Price, chair, 2025 Report Cycle
- Randall Schriver, Vice Chair
- Dr. Hal Brands
- Aaron Freidberg
- Carte P. Goodwin
- Michael Kuiken
- Leland R. Miller
- Livia Shmavonian
- Cliff Sims
- Jonathan Stivers

=== Notable Former Commissioners ===
- Robin Cleveland
- James Talent
- Katherine C. Tobin

== See also ==
- United States House Select Committee on Strategic Competition between the United States and the Chinese Communist Party
