= Citytv Saskatchewan =

Television channel in Saskatchewan, Canada

- Country: Canada
- Broadcast area: Saskatchewan; National (via satellite)
- Network: Citytv; Former affiliations: Educational independent (1991–2012)
- Headquarters: Regina, Saskatchewan

Programming
- Picture format: 1080i (HDTV); 480i (SDTV)

Ownership
- Owner: Rogers Sports & Media
- Parent: Rogers Communications
- Sister channels: Sportsnet West

History
- Launched: May 6, 1991 (35 years ago)
- Former names: Saskatchewan Communications Network (1991–2012); City Saskatchewan (2012–2018)

Links
- Website: www.citytv.com/saskatchewan

Citytv Saskatchewan (formerly the Saskatchewan Communications Network or SCN) is a Canadian English language cable television channel in the province of Saskatchewan. Headquartered in the provincial capital of Regina, the channel is owned by the Rogers Sports & Media subsidiary of Rogers Communications and operates as a de facto owned-and-operated station of its Citytv television network. Its studios are shared with CBC's Regina studios on 2440 Broad Street in Downtown Regina.

Citytv Saskatchewan is licensed by the Canadian Radio-television and Telecommunications Commission (CRTC) as an educational programming service for the province of Saskatchewan. It was formerly operated by the government of Saskatchewan as a public broadcaster. In March 2010, the government announced that it would shut down the network due to low viewership. In June 2010, the government announced that it would instead privatize and sell the network to Bluestone Investment Group. Under Bluestone, SCN was converted to a format similar to Alberta's Access network, airing commercial-supported entertainment programming during the late-afternoon and prime time hours, and commercial-free educational and cultural programming from 6 a.m. to 3 p.m. daily. In late-December 2011, SCN announced that it would affiliate with Rogers' Citytv network for its entertainment programming beginning on January 2, 2012. In June 2012, Rogers would acquire SCN entirely, maintaining the same programming model implemented by Bluepoint.

Because it is licensed as an educational broadcaster, Citytv Saskatchewan is required to be distributed as part of the basic cable service in Saskatchewan, and is also available on Bell Satellite TV and Shaw Direct. The channel is defined as a satellite-to-cable television programming undertaking, meaning that it has full simultaneous substitution rights for its programming in Saskatchewan, but does not operate any over-the-air transmitters.

== History ==
=== Public television ===
In February 1991, the Government of Saskatchewan (led at the time by Premier Allan Blakeney) was granted a broadcast licence for a non-commercial educational service by the CRTC. The channel, Saskatchewan Communications Network (SCN), was launched on May 6 of that year. (Ontario's TVOntario was launched on September 27, 1970; British Columbia's Knowledge Network was launched on January 12, 1981; and Alberta's Access, which is now the privately owned CTV 2 Alberta, was launched on June 30, 1973.)

SCN's first logo, used from 1991 to 2001.

SCN's second logo, used from 2001 to 2007. It was still used as the channel's official logo until 2011.

As a publicly owned entity, SCN received funding from the Government of Saskatchewan and from the general public in the form of donations. At the time, SCN frequently stopped between shows to ask for pledges like other public broadcasters such as PBS in the United States.

Noted programming on the channel included the music performance series The Neighbors Dog.

=== Privatization ===
The Government of Saskatchewan (then led by Premier Brad Wall) announced on March 24, 2010, that it would wind down SCN's operations, citing low ratings, with some operations such as distance education broadcasts to be transferred to SaskTel. The channel was to have shut down at the end of April, but it was later decided to keep the channel in operation while offers to buy SCN were evaluated. On June 21, 2010, the Government of Saskatchewan announced the channel would be sold to Bluepoint Investment Corporation. During the CRTC approval process, Bluepoint requested several amendments to SCN's licence, which would allow the channel to air limited amounts of non-educational programming with commercials. The CRTC approved the sale of SCN to Bluepoint and the licence amendments on December 23, 2010. The transaction was completed shortly thereafter, and at that point, SCN lost its original revenue streams of government funding and viewer donations.

SCN's third logo, used from 2007 to 2009.

SCN's fourth logo, used from 2009 to 2011.

SCN's fifth and final logo, used from 2011 to 2012 under Bluepoint ownership.

Under Bluepoint's approved amendments to its licence, SCN was still required to air commercial-free educational programming from 6 a.m. to 3 p.m.; after 3 p.m., the channel would be allowed to air entertainment-based programming with up to 14 minutes of advertising per hour – Bluepoint planned to use this new ability to air programming that could attract new advertising revenue to the channel, in a hybrid format similar to Alberta's Access. When Bluepoint took over control of the station, few changes were made to SCN's programming, other than introducing films seven nights a week starting at 9 p.m. during the summer of 2011. The first major changes to the channel occurred on September 12, 2011, premiering a new prime time lineup of current American network series such as Supernatural and The Insider, and classic series such as Danger Bay, Family Ties, and Frasier.

=== Affiliation with Citytv, acquisition by Rogers ===
On December 20, 2011, SCN announced that it had entered into an affiliation agreement with Rogers Communications to air Citytv programs from 3 p.m. to 6 a.m. starting on January 2, 2012, with educational, children's and locally produced programming continuing to air on SCN outside those hours (to fulfill the channel's licence as an educational station). The post-3 p.m. programming, branded as "Citytv on SCN", consisted of entertainment programming sourced from Rogers' Citytv stations, including the network's prime time lineup. With the Citytv affiliation, SCN became the second Canadian educational television service to carry entertainment programming from one of the major commercial networks or television systems. The other was Alberta's Access, which adopted the CTV Two name and lineup upon its relaunch in August 2011. It also gave the Citytv system affiliations in all provinces west of Quebec and south of the federal territories of Northern Canada. (Rogers later expanded Citytv into Quebec when it affiliated with CJNT Montreal in June 2012, which the company also purchased.)

The next year, Rogers Media announced its intent to acquire SCN from Bluepoint Investment Corporation. The sale was approved by the CRTC on June 21, 2012, and closed later that month, making the channel an owned-and-operated station of the Citytv system. Rogers relaunched the channel as Citytv Saskatchewan on July 1. Rogers planned to invest into improving the channel's infrastructure, and to launch a high definition feed for the channel in the coming year. No regional news programming is planned for the channel under Rogers ownership; as such, Citytv Saskatchewan is the first Citytv owned-and-operated station to carry no localized news programming (All other Citytv stations air nightly CityNews broadcasts at 6 p.m. and 11 p.m., as well as a national broadcast of Breakfast Television. Citytv stations in Toronto, Calgary, and Vancouver also air their own local versions of BT.)

== Programming ==
In addition to airing Citytv's schedule of entertainment programming, Rogers committed when the channel was purchased to maintaining the channel's requirement to air commercial-free educational programming from 6 a.m. to 3 p.m. daily. Children's programming airs from 6 a.m. to 1 p.m. in a block branded as CityKids, with educational programming for adults and older youth aired from 1 p.m. to 3 p.m. daily.

== See also ==
- CTV 2 Alberta - a similar cable-only affiliate of CTV 2 in the Canadian province of Alberta; formerly Access
- CTV 2 Atlantic - a similar cable-only affiliate of CTV 2 in Atlantic Canada; formerly the Atlantic Satellite Network (ASN) and A Atlantic
- The CW Plus - an alternate feed of The CW for small and mid-size television markets in the United States, consisting of privately owned digital multicast channels and cable-only affiliates, with syndicated programs supplied by the network in addition to CW network programming
