= Borealis (2020 film) =

2020 Canadian documentary film

- Directed by: Kevin McMahon
- Written by: Kevin McMahon
- Produced by: Kristina McLaughlin; Kevin McMahon; Michael McMahon; Justine Pimlott; Felicity Justrabo
- Cinematography: John Minh Tran
- Edited by: Nathan Shields
- Music by: Ohad Benchetrit; Justin Small
- Production companies: Primitive Entertainment; National Film Board of Canada
- Distributed by: TVOntario
- Release date: December 15, 2020
- Running time: 93 minutes
- Country: Canada
- Language: English

Borealis is a Canadian documentary film, directed by Kevin McMahon and released in 2020. The film is a portrait of the delicate ecosystem of the Canadian boreal forest, highlighting the environmental threats that are damaging it.

The film had been slated to premiere at the 2020 Hot Docs Canadian International Documentary Festival, but after the festival was postponed in light of the COVID-19 pandemic in Canada, it was not one of the films screened when the festival proceeded virtually in May. The film instead premiered in December 2020 in a television broadcast on TVOntario.

== Awards ==
Award	Date of ceremony	Category	Recipient(s)	Result	Ref(s)
Canadian Screen Awards	2022	Rob Stewart Award	Kevin McMahon, Michael McMahon, Kristina McLaughlin, Justine Pimlott, Felicity Justrabo	Won	
Canadian Screen Awards	2022	Best Photography in a Documentary Program or Factual Series	John Minh Tran	Won	
