= Reva Price =

American public servant

Reva Price is an American public servant. She is the 2025 report chair of the U.S.-China Economic and Security Review Commission.

== Early life and education ==
Price was born in Kisco, New York. Price graduated from the State University of New York, Binghamton.

== Career ==
Price worked for the Jewish Council for Public Affairs, bringing together diverse coalitions across the faith community to advocate on policy matters. From 2005 to 2023, Price worked as director of outreach and senior advisor to former Speaker Nancy Pelosi.

Then-Speaker Pelosi appointed Price to a two-year term on the U.S.-China Commission in 2023. She was reappointed to the U.S.-China Commission by House Democratic Leader Hakeem Jeffries for a term expiring December 31, 2026.
