= Our Man in Tehran =

Canadian documentary film (2013)

- Film poster
- Directed by: Drew Taylor; Larry Weinstein
- Written by: Drew Taylor; Robert Wright
- Produced by: Niv Fichman; Elena Semikina; Drew Taylor; Larry Weinstein
- Cinematography: John Minh Tran
- Edited by: Steve Weslak
- Music by: Asher Lenz; Stephen Skratt
- Production company: Rhombus Media
- Release date: 13 September 2013 (TIFF)
- Country: Canada
- Language: English

Our Man in Tehran is a 2013 Canadian documentary film, profiling the role of Kenneth D. Taylor, Canada's ambassador to Iran in the 1970s, in helping six American hostages escape from Iran during the Iran hostage crisis of 1979-1980 by engineering the Canadian Caper.

The film premiered at the 2013 Toronto International Film Festival, but was distributed to general audiences as a television film on The Movie Network. It was released in the United States on May 15, 2015.

Several other political, journalism and diplomatic personalities involved in the events also appear in the film, including Joe Clark, Flora MacDonald, Robert Anders, William Daugherty, Carole Jerome, Tony Mendez, Joe Schlesinger, Zena Sheardown and Gary Sick.

The film won five Canadian Screen Awards at the 3rd Canadian Screen Awards in 2015, winning Best Documentary Program, Best Direction in a Documentary or Factual Series (Drew Taylor, Larry Weinstein), Best Photography in a Documentary Program or Factual Series (John Minh Tran), Best Picture Editing in a Documentary Program or Factual Series (Steve Weslak) and Best Sound in a Documentary, Factual or Lifestyle Program or Series (Martin Lee, David McCallum, Sanjay Mehta, Brennan Mercer, Jane Tattersall).

Our Man in Tehran is regarding as a Canadian rebuttal to the American film 'Argo', which inaccurately portraited Taylor and the Canadian embassy in Tehran as meek observers to the CIA heroics.

The film was adapted in part from cowriter Robert Wright's 2010 book Our Man in Tehran.
