= Fort McMoney =

- Director: David Dufresne
- Release: 25 November 2013
- Genre: Strategy

Fort McMoney is a 2013 web documentary and strategy video game about Fort McMurray, Alberta, Canada and Athabasca oil sands development, directed by David Dufresne. The documentary uses interactive game elements to allow users to decide the city's future and attempt to responsibly develop the world's largest oil sands reserves.

== Game play ==
The game consists of three episodes, each played in real-time over a four-week period. Starting November 25, users will decide on the virtual future of the city, while exploring the social, economic, political and cultural history of Fort McMurray. Players will be able to virtually walk around the city, meet residents and ask them questions. Each week, they'll be able to vote in referendums and surveys that will affect the city's virtual future, engage in debates, and attempt to win other players over to their "worldview" in order influence the city's development. The game is trilingual: available in English, French, and German.

== Production ==
Fort McMoney incorporates 60 days of filming in more than 22 locations in the city, including 55 interviews. Research took place over 2 years, with 2000 hours of footage shot, at a cost of C$870,000. It is a collaboration of the National Film Board of Canada (NFB) and TOXA in association with Arte. Dufresne has stated he is drawn to stories about single-industry towns, having previously directed an award-winning webdoc about Cañon City, Colorado, entitled Prison Valley. The project features photographs by Philippe Brault. It was produced by Philippe Lamarre and Raphaëlle Huysmans (TOXA) and Hugues Sweeney and Dominique Willieme (NFB), in association with Arte.

== Release ==
Fort McMoney is being launched at the International Documentary Film Festival Amsterdam, with pre-launch events in Paris, Toronto and Montreal, as part of Rencontres internationales du documentaire de Montréal, an international documentary film festival. It will also be accessible online via four media partners: The Globe and Mail and Radio-Canada in Canada, as well as France's Le Monde and Germany's Süddeutsche Zeitung.

In February 2015, Fort McMoney was named Best Original Interactive Production Produced for Digital Media at the 3rd Canadian Screen Awards.
