= StarLife (India) =

Star Life
- Country: India
- Broadcast area: India
- Network: JioStar
- Headquarters: Mumbai

Programming
- Languages: English; Hindi; Tamil; Bengali
- Picture format: 576i (SDTV); 1080i (HDTV)

Ownership
- Owner: JioStar
- Sister channels: JioStar Channels

History
- Launched: 22 November 2008; 17 years ago
- Replaced: FOX Life
- Closed: 15 March 2025; 17 months ago
- Former names: Fox History & Entertainment (22 November 2008 – 17 May 2011); Fox History & Traveller (17 May 2011 – 30 October 2011); Fox Traveller (30 October 2011 – 15 June 2014); Fox Life (15 June 2014 – 13 April 2024)

Star Life was an Indian pay television channel operated by JioStar, a subsidiary of Disney India. It was discontinued on 15 March 2025.

Star Life was aimed at viewers in India and other neighbouring countries including Nepal, Bhutan, Bangladesh, Pakistan and Sri Lanka. It was available in English, Hindi, Tamil and Bengali.

== History ==
Star Life (formerly known as Fox History & Entertainment and Fox Life) was initially owned by Fox Networks Group, which also operated and distributed other channels in India including FX, Fox Crime and BabyTV.

The channel was launched as a rebrand to The History Channel, which was renamed on 22 November 2008 as Fox History & Entertainment.

Fox History & Entertainment experimented with a dedicated Traveller Band (weeknights from 9 to 10 pm) in January 2011. The first local Indian production of 2011 was a show that explored the psyche of Indian men across the country through the eyes of two sassy, urban women – Sugandha Garg and Indrani Dasgupta called What's With Indian Men.

The channel was renamed once again as Fox History & Traveller on 17 May 2011 and as Fox Traveller on 30 October 2011.

On 15 June 2014, Fox Traveller was replaced by the Indian feed of Fox Life, which ran in other countries. On 14 March 2024, Disney announced that Fox Life would be rebranded as Star Life on 13 April 2024, thus phasing out the Fox brand in Asia.

The channel was discontinued on 15 March 2025.

== Programming ==
All the programmes are currently being telecast in English, Hindi, Tamil, Bengali, and Marathi in India.

- 5 Ingredient Fix
- Eat St.
- Food Safari
- From Spain with Love with Annie Sibonney
- Getaway
- The Janice Dickinson Modeling Agency
- Kitchen Nightmares
- MasterChef
- My Sri Lanka with Peter Kuruvita
- Project Runway
- Street Food Around the World
- What's with Indian Men?
