= I Wrecked My House =

Canadian reality TV series

- Genre: home renovation reality
- Starring: Steve Patterson; Dave Rannala
- Country of origin: Canada
- No. of seasons: 1
- No. of episodes: 15

Production
- Production company: Mountain Road Productions

Original release
- Network: HGTV Canada
- Release: 2014 – present

I Wrecked My House is a Canadian home renovation reality series, which airs on HGTV. Hosted by Steve Patterson, the show visits homeowners with poor home renovation skills — people whose abilities are, according to the producers, more MacGyver or Red Green than Mike Holmes — who then receive a professional home renovation from contractor Dave Rannala in collaboration with a local design company.

The series premiered in April 2014 with a one-hour special which profiled five sets of homeowners, while the regular series launched in April 2015 with 14 half-hour episodes profiling a single home per episode. The show was produced and co-written by Toronto-based producer, Derek Miller.

Patterson garnered a Canadian Screen Award nomination for Best Host in a Variety, Lifestyle, Reality/Competition, or Talk Program or Series at the 3rd Canadian Screen Awards.
