= Leland Miller =

American author

Leland Miller is an American author who serves on the U.S.-China Economic and Security Review Commission.

== Early life and education ==
Miller earned his BA from Washington and Lee University in 1998. He holds a J.D. degree from the University of Virginia School of Law, where he was Hardy C. Dillard fellow and editor-in-chief of the International Law Journal; a master's degree in Chinese History from Oxford University (St. Antony's College); and a graduate Chinese language fellowship from Tunghai University (Taiwan).

== Career ==
Miller cofounded China Beige Book in 2010, an advisory firm with one of the world's largest private data networks focused on the Chinese economy.

Miller was appointed to the U.S.-China Commission by Speaker Mike Johnson for a term expiring December 31, 2025.
