= Unusually Thicke =

- Genre: Mockumentary
- Starring: Alan Thicke; Tanya Callau; Carter Thicke; Brennan Thicke; Robin Thicke
- Countries of origin: Canada; United States
- Original language: English
- No. of seasons: 2
- No. of episodes: 28

Production
- Production company: Peacock Alley Entertainment

Original release
- Network: Slice (Canada, season 1); HGTV (Canada, season 2); Pop (U.S.)
- Release: April 16, 2014 – October 15, 2015

Unusually Thicke is a Canadian-American mockumentary television series, which premiered in 2014. Billed as a "reality-sitcom hybrid", the series combines a reality television format with improvisational comedy to present a fictionalized portrayal of the family life of actor Alan Thicke.

The core cast consists of Thicke, his wife Tanya Callau and his teenage son Carter. His adult sons, businessman Brennan Thicke and pop singer Robin Thicke, make some appearances but are not full-time cast members. Guest performers in the series have included Bob Saget, David Hasselhoff, Wayne Gretzky, John Stamos, Bill Maher and Thicke's former Growing Pains co-stars Joanna Kerns, Jeremy Miller and Tracey Gold.

Produced by Canadian firm Peacock Alley Entertainment, the series aired on Pop in the United States and Slice in Canada.

In June 2014, after the series completed its first season run, its renewal for a second season was announced. The series garnered a Canadian Screen Award nomination for Best Reality/Competition Program or Series at the 3rd Canadian Screen Awards.

The second season aired in Canada under the title Unusually Thicke: Under Construction, and centred on Thicke and his family doing a renovation project on their home. In Canada, Under Construction aired on HGTV in 2015, although in the United States it aired on Pop under the original Unusually Thicke title beginning in September 2016.

Thicke died of a heart attack on December 13, 2016, soon after the second season completed its U.S. television run. Pop subsequently announced plans to rerun the entire series between December 19 and December 23 in tribute to Thicke. Peacock Alley initially left open the possibility that the show could continue production with the focus shifted to other surviving family members, but no further episodes of the show have been produced.

== Episode list ==
=== Season 1 ===
- 1. Hoarders
- 2. The Anniversary
- 3. Rockin' Robin
- 4. A Growing Pain in the Butt
- 5. The Thickenator
- 6. Walk of Shame
- 7. Hockey Night in Miami
- 8. Party House Rules
- 9. Off the Grid
- 10. Summer Jobs
- 11. The Naked Truth
- 12. Empty Nest
- 13. Par for the Course
- 14. Baby Talk

=== Season 2 ===
- 15. Cell Mates
- 16. The Promposal
- 17. Different Strokes
- 18. Tattoo You
- 19. Silence of the Goats
- 20. Last Tango
- 21. Gilbert Gets a Rash
- 22. Home and Native Land
- 23. No Ifs, and or Butts
- 24. The Road Warrior
- 25. Father of the Bribe
- 26. All Shook Up
- 27. Growing Strains
- 28. Bucket List
