= Wild Canada =

Canadian documentary television miniseries

- Genre: Documentary
- Created by: Jeff Turner; Sue Turner
- Starring: David Suzuki
- Country of origin: Canada
- No. of seasons: 1
- No. of episodes: 4

Original release
- Network: CBC Television
- Release: March 13 – April 4, 2014

Wild Canada is a Canadian documentary television miniseries, which aired in 2014 on CBC Television as part of its The Nature of Things series. Created by documentarians Jeff and Sue Turner, the series profiles the natural environment of Canada through high-definition video footage. The Turners were both contributors to the similar BBC series Planet Earth and Frozen Planet.

The series garnered several Canadian Screen Award nominations at the 3rd Canadian Screen Awards, including Best Nature or Nature Documentary Program or Series, Best Direction in a Documentary or Factual Series, Best Photography in a Documentary Program or Factual Series and Best Original Music for a Non-Fiction Program or Series, and its companion digital media application for smartphones and tablets was nominated for Best Cross-Platform Project, Non-Fiction. Jeff Turner won the award for Best Direction in a Documentary or Factual Series, for the episode "The Eternal Frontier".

== Episodes ==
No.	Title	Directed by	Written by	Original release date
1	"The Eternal Frontier"	Jeff Turner	Jeff Turner	13 March 2014
2	"The Wild West"	Jeff Turner	Jeff Turner	20 March 2014
3	"The Heartland"	Jeff Turner	Jeff Turner	27 March 2014
4	"Ice Edge"	Jeff Turner	Jeff Turner	3 April 2014
