= Baby Sellers =

- Written by: Suzette Couture
- Directed by: Nick Willing
- Starring: Jennifer Finnigan; Kirstie Alley; Arjun Gupta
- Music by: Rich Walters
- Countries of origin: Canada; United Kingdom
- Original language: English

Production
- Producers: Matthew O'Connor; Shan Tam; Robert Halmi Snr
- Cinematography: Brian Johnson
- Editor: Alison Grace
- Running time: 90 minutes

Original release
- Release: August 15, 2013

Baby Sellers is a television film starring Jennifer Finnigan, Kirstie Alley and Arjun Gupta exposing the dark world of international baby trafficking.

== Synopsis ==
ICE agent Nic Morrison (Finnigan) investigates a corrupt US child adoption agency run by Carla Huxley (Alley) who acquires babies abroad illegally.

== Production ==
The film was shot on location in Mumbai, India, Rio de Janeiro, Brazil and Vancouver, British Columbia, Canada.

== Release ==
The film aired on Lifetime on August 17, 2013.

=== United Nations Screening ===
Baby Sellers was invited by the UN to premiere in the Eco Soc Chamber on August 12, 2013 in front of 400 delegates, NGO's and ambassadors. After the screening, a panel of experts hosted a Q&A. Simone Monasebian, director of United Nations Office of Drugs and Crime chaired the panel which included Peter Edge, ICE Homeland Security deputy executive associate director, Greg Ramm, director of Global Programs for Save the Children, Robert Halmi, Snr, producer of Baby Sellers, and Jennifer Finnigan, star of the film.

== Reception ==
=== Critical reception ===
Jackie K. Cooper of HuffPost praised the story and cast, particularly Alley's performance. Dean Robbins of The Iowa Source said that the writing and direction of the film evoked "maximum outrage".

=== Audience reception ===
Airing on Lifetime Television Baby Sellers topped Saturday night - Number 1 amongst cable networks with 2.139 million viewers, #1; 0.848 million adults 18-49 (0.7 rating), #1

== Awards ==
Winner of Best Screenplay at the 2015 Canadian Screen Awards. A further six Nominations for Best Dramatic Mini-Series or TV Movie, Best Director, Best Editing, Best Costume and Best Leading Actress.
