= Tales from the Organ Trade =

Tales From the Organ Trade
- Directed by: Ric Esther Bienstock
- Written by: Ric Esther Bienstock
- Produced by: Ric Esther Bienstock; Felix Golubev; Simcha Jacobovici
- Narrated by: David Cronenberg
- Cinematography: Frank Vilaca; Michael Ellis; Kenneth Ng
- Edited by: Steve Weslak
- Music by: John Welsman
- Production company: Associated Producers Ltd.
- Release date: April 14, 2013 (Documentary Edge)
- Running time: 82 minutes
- Country: Canada
- Language: English

Tales From the Organ Trade is a 2013 Canadian documentary film written and directed by Emmy Award-winning filmmaker Ric Esther Bienstock. It was produced by Ric Esther Bienstock, Felix Golubev and Simcha Jacobovici. The film was created in association with HBO Documentary Films, Shaw Media and Canal D. The film examines the shadowy world of black market organ trafficking. The film is narrated by David Cronenberg.

== Reaction ==
The film has been positively received by critics. Maclean's calls the film "a serious, superb and essential documentary that cuts through the sensationalism and hysteria surrounding its subject. It’s one of the most impressive, and incisive, works of investigative journalism I’ve seen onscreen in a long time. It’s also a virtuosic feat of story-telling." and continues to say that Ric Esther Bienstock's film "is a nuanced, analytical portrait of the fierce ethical dilemmas on both sides of the issue, which Bienstock distills into cautious advocacy for a sensible solution."

== Awards ==
| Award | Institution | Year | Category | Recipients and nominees | Result |
|---|---|---|---|---|---|
| Canadian Screen Award | Academy of Canadian Cinema and Television | 2015 | Donald Brittain Award | Ric Esther Bienstock, Felix Golubev, Simcha Jacobovici | Won |
| Canadian Screen Award | Academy of Canadian Cinema and Television | 2015 | Best Original Music for a Non-Fiction Program or Series | John Welsman | Won |
| Canadian Screen Award | Academy of Canadian Cinema and Television | 2015 | Best Writing in a Documentary Program or Factual Series | Ric Esther Bienstock | Won |
| Canadian Screen Award | Academy of Canadian Cinema and Television | 2015 | Best Editorial Research | Ric Esther Bienstock, Sheila Mandell, Anastasia Trofimova | Won |
| Emmy Award | Emmy Award | 2014 | Outstanding Investigative Journalism—Long-Form | - | Nominated |
| Emmy Award | Emmy Award | 2014 | Outstanding Writing | Ric Esther Bienstock | Nominated |
| British Documentary Award | The Grierson Trust | 2014 | Best Documentary on Current Affairs | - | Nominated |
| Edward R. Murrow Award | Overseas Press Club of America | 2014 | Best TV Interpretation or Documentary on International Affairs | - | Won |
| Jack R. Howard Award | Scripps Howard Foundation | 2014 | Television/Cable In-Depth National and International Coverage | - | Won |
| Norman Bethune Award for Excellence in International Health Reporting - Print, Broadcast Award | Canadian Medical Association Media Awards for Health Reporting | 2014 | - | - | Won |
| Global Awareness Award | WorldMediaFestival | 2014 | - | - | Won |
| Intermedia-globe Gold Award | WorldMediaFestival | 2014 | Documentary | - | Won |
| Golden Eagle | CINE | 2014 | Televised News Division – Investigative Reporting | - | Won |
| Golden Sheaf | Yorkton Film Festival | 2014 | Documentary Social/Political | - | Won |
| Silver Hugo | Chicago International Film Festival Television Awards | 2014 | Documentary: Social/Political | - | Won |
| Silver Screen | US International Film & Video Festival | 2014 | Documentary Programs: Social Issues | - | Won |

== Festival Awards ==
| Festival | Award | Year | Category | Recipients and nominees | Result |
|---|---|---|---|---|---|
| Documentary Edge Festival | - | 2013 | Best Sign of the Times | - | Won |
| DocUtah Southern Utah Documentary Film Festival | Raven Award | 2013 | Best Film | - | Won |
| DocUtah Southern Utah Documentary Film Festival | Raven Award | 2013 | Best Director | Ric Esther Bienstock | Won |
| Tenerife International Film Festival | - | 2013 | Best Feature Documentary | - | Won |
| Nevada International Film Festival | - | 2013 | Special Jury Prize | - | Won |
| 12th San Sebastián Human Rights Film Festival - Donostia San Sebastián | Amnesty International Award | 2014 | - | - | Won |
| Mexico International Film Festival | Golden Palm Award | 2014 | - | - | Won |
