= Nancy Wood (journalist) =

Canadian journalist

- Occupation: Journalist
- Employer: Canadian Broadcasting Corporation

Nancy Wood is a Canadian journalist with the Canadian Broadcasting Corporation (CBC), where she hosts CBC Television's nightly newscast CBC Montreal News at 11.

She is a 1985 graduate of Concordia University.

She began her career in 1985 as a staff reporter with the Montreal Gazette and went on to the Toronto Star and then to the Ottawa bureau of Maclean's magazine, before moving to Montreal in 1994 to work for the CBC.

In 1994, she joined CBC Radio, hosting CBM's local programs Radio Noon, Quebec's sole, English-language, province-wide radio talk show, in 1995. She became host of the CBC early morning show Daybreak in 2009. Later she worked on Radio-Canada's Enquête, where she investigated air taxi safety, the Montreal Casino, and the Canadian Armed Forces. In 2006 Montreal Gazette journalist Mike Boone reported that Wood had turned down a journalism job in Toronto to remain in Montreal as the CBC National's Quebec reporter because she felt that remaining in one place was a more stable way to bring up her school-age children.

Wood was hired as host of the popular Canadian Broadcasting Corporation early morning Montreal program Daybreak Montreal in 2009. Her dismissal in 2010 was the subject of some controversy in Montreal.

In 2012 she became a news anchor on CBMT-DT.
