= One Night Stand with Annie Sibonney =

- Presented by: Annie Sibonney
- Country of origin: Canada
- Original language: English
- No. of series: 1
- No. of episodes: 6

Production
- Production company: Entertainment One

One Night Stand with Annie Sibonney is a Canadian reality television show, which premiered in 2014 on Discovery World. Hosted by Toronto-based broadcaster Annie Sibonney, the series features Sibonney visiting a different world city each week, in which she explores and profiles the city's cuisine and nightlife. Sibonney is a businesswoman who owns Relish, a culinary tour company, and previously hosted the series From Spain with Love with Annie Sibonney.

The series acquisition was announced by Discovery World in December 2013.

The series garnered two Canadian Screen Award nominations at the 3rd Canadian Screen Awards, for best lifestyle/talk series and best photography in a lifestyle/reality program.
