= List of programs broadcast by MTV (Canada) =

This is a list of television programs broadcast by the Canadian television channel MTV Canada and its former incarnation as talktv.

== Programming ==
This is a list of programs broadcast prior to its closure in December 2024:

=== Current ===
==== Regular programming ====
===== A-E =====
- Catfish: The TV Show (MTV Entertainment Studios)

===== F-J =====
- Faking It (MTV Entertainment Studios)
- Finding Carter (MTV Entertainment Studios)
- Friendzone (495 Productions)
- Generation Cryo (Off the Fence)
- Geordie Shore (Lime Pictures)
- Girl Code (MTV Platform Development)
- Grand Benders (MDF Productions)
- Happyland (Storyline Entertainment)

===== K-O =====
- Kesha: My Crazy Beautiful Life (MTV)
- Losing It (MTV Entertainment Studios)
- McMorris & McMorris (MTV Entertainment Studios)
- MTV Creeps (MTV Entertainment Studios)
- MTV Cribs (MTV Entertainment Studios)

===== P-T =====
- Panic Button (MTV Entertainment Studios)
- Play with AJ (MTV Entertainment Studios)
- Ridiculousness (MTV Entertainment Studios)
- Scrubbing In (Never Nominated)
- The Shannara Chronicles (MTV Production Development)
- Snack-Off (MTV Entertainment Studios)
- Snooki & Jwoww (MTV Entertainment Studios)
- Teen Mom (MTV Entertainment Studios)
- Teen Mom 2 (MTV Entertainment Studios)
- Teen Mom 3 (MTV Entertainment Studios)
- Teen Wolf (MTV Production Development)

===== U-Z =====
- Virgin Territory (MTV Production Development)

==== Special programming ====
- MTV Europe Music Awards
- MTV Movie Awards
- MTV Video Music Awards
- We Day

=== Acquired ===
- Breaker High (Saban Entertainment)
- Clueless (Paramount Television)
- How It's Made (Discovery Channel)
- Innerspace (Space show) (Space Productions)
- Malcolm in the Middle (20th Television)
- Movie Night (E! Canada show) (E! Originals)
- Sabrina the Teenage Witch (Paramount Television)
- Saved by the Bell (Universal Television)
- South Park (Comedy Partners)
- Student Bodies (20th Television, Sunbow Entertainment, Telescene)

=== Past ===
==== Regular programming ====
===== 0-9 =====
- 16 and Pregnant
- 4REAL
- 8th & Ocean

===== A-E =====
- Adventures in Hollyhood
- After Degrassi
- The After Show
- At the Movies with Ebert & Roeper (talktv)
- Balance: Television for Living Well (talktv)
- Bam's Unholy Union
- Beavis and Butt-Head
- Buckwild
- Buzzin'
- Camilla Scott Show (talktv)
- Canada's Next Top Model
- Celebrity Pets (talktv)
- The Chatroom (talktv)
- Cheyenne
- The City
- Clone High
- Comedy Now!
- DanceLife
- Diary
- The Dini Petty Show (talktv)
- Engaged and Underage
- eTalk (talktv)
- eTalk Daily Profiles (talktv)

===== F-J =====
- Failosophy
- Fat Camp
- From G's to Gents
- The Hills
- The Hills: The After Show
- I'm from Rolling Stone
- Impact
- The Jack Benny Program (talktv)
- Jersey Shore
- Juvies

===== K-O =====
- The Kentucky Kid
- Kevin Spencer
- Keys to the VIP
- Laguna Beach: The After Show
- Laguna Beach: The Real Orange County
- Life of Ryan
- Live It Up! (talktv)
- Live with Regis and Kelly (talktv)
- Living Lahaina
- Living on the Edge
- Made
- Making the Band
- Making the Video
- Man and Wife
- Mason Lee: On the Edge (talktv)
- Maui Fever
- Me & Mr. Jones
- Meet the Barkers
- Miss Seventeen
- MTV e2
- MTV Live
- MTV Live Hacked
- MTV News
- MTV Presents
- MTV Screen
- MTV Show Choir
- MTV Showtown
- MTV's The 70s House
- My Super Sweet 16
- Never Ever Do This at Home
- Newlyweds: Nick and Jessica
- Newport Harbor: The Real Orange County
- Next

===== P-T =====
- Pageant Place
- Pamela Wallin's TalkTV (talktv)
- The Paper
- Parental Control
- Peak Season
- Person to Person (talktv)
- Pimp My Ride
- Pranked!
- Punk'd
- The Real World
- Real World/Road Rules Challenge
- Road Rules
- Rob & Big
- Room Raiders
- Ruby Wax Meets... (talktv)
- Run's House
- Scarred
- The Second Half
- The Sharon Osbourne Show (talktv)
- A Shot at Love: The Hangover
- A Shot at Love with Tila Tequila
- SqueezePlay (talktv)
- That's Amore!
- 'Til Death Do Us Part: Carmen and Dave
- True Life
- True Love
- Two-A-Days

===== U-Z =====
- Vicki Gabereau (talktv)
- The View (talktv)
- Viva La Bam
- W-FIVE (talktv)
- Why Can't I Be You?
- Wrestling Society X
- The X Effect
- Yo Momma
