= The Best Laid Plans (TV series) =

- Genre: Comedy drama
- Written by: Susan Coyne; Jason Sherman
- Starring: Jonas Chernick; Kenneth Welsh; Mark McKinney; Sarah Allen; Jodi Balfour; Sonja Smits
- Country of origin: Canada
- No. of seasons: 1
- No. of episodes: 6

Production
- Executive producers: Peter Moss; Phyllis Platt; Brian Dennis
- Running time: 60 minutes
- Production company: PDM Entertainment

Original release
- Network: CBC Television
- Release: January 5 – February 3, 2014

The Best Laid Plans is a Canadian comedy-drama miniseries based on the Stephen Leacock Award-winning 2008 novel of the same name by Terry Fallis. The series stars Jonas Chernick as Daniel Addison, a disillusioned political staffer in the office of Opposition Leader George Quimby (Mark McKinney) who is forced to run a local candidate's campaign during a federal election. The election featured is in part a parody of the 2008 Canadian federal election. The six-part series premiered January 5, 2014 on CBC Television and concluded its run on February 3, 2014.

== Plot ==
When Daniel catches his girlfriend (Sarah Allen), also a political staffer, and her boss in flagrante delicto he decides to flee political life and return to academe as assistant professor of English at the University of Ottawa. But it turns out that a life in politics is a bit like life in the mob – you just don’t walk away. For Daniel, the cost of exit is that he must find a candidate in a small riding 50 kilometers away and manage the campaign in the quickly approaching election. The catch: the riding in question has voted solidly for the governing party in every single election since Confederation and the incumbent is Eric Cameron (Peter Keleghan), the extremely popular finance minister whose approval rating in the last election was over 90%. Daniel's plan, therefore, is to select the seemingly unelectable Angus McClintock (Kenneth Welsh) in order to kill off his own credibility as a political strategist — as the campaign progresses, however, McClintock's unconventional attitude begins to strike a chord with voters, and Daniel's campaign to lose becomes increasingly difficult.

The show's cast also includes Raoul Bhaneja, Eric Peterson, Sonja Smits, Jodi Balfour, Barbara Gordon, Jordan Johnson-Hinds, Varun Saranga, Ron Lea, and Leah Pinsent.

== Production ==
Production on the series began in summer 2013. Some scenes were filmed on Parliament Hill during Parliament's summer recess.

The series was written by Susan Coyne and Jason Sherman, and is produced by Phyllis Platt, Brian Dennis and Peter Moss of PDM Entertainment.

== Awards ==
The series won three 2014 Directors Guild of Canada Awards in 2014: Best Television Movie/Mini-Series, Best Picture Editing - Television Movie/Mini-Series, Best Sound Editing - Television Movie/Mini-Series.
