= Sensitive Skin (Canadian TV series) =

- Genre: Black comedy
- Based on: Sensitive Skin (BBC series) by Hugo Blick
- Written by: Bob Martin
- Directed by: Don McKellar
- Starring: Kim Cattrall; Don McKellar; Elliott Gould; Colm Feore
- Country of origin: Canada
- Original language: English
- No. of seasons: 2
- No. of episodes: 12

Production
- Executive producers: Kim Cattrall; Don McKellar; Bob Martin; Henry Normal; Hugo Blick
- Producers: Niv Fichman; Sari Friedland
- Camera setup: Single
- Running time: 30 minutes
- Production companies: Rhombus Media; Baby Cow Productions

Original release
- Network: HBO Canada
- Release: July 20, 2014 – June 19, 2016

Related
- Sensitive Skin (British TV series)

Sensitive Skin is a Canadian black comedy television series, adapted from the British series of the same name created by Hugo Blick. Its six-episode first season, written by comedian Bob Martin and directed by Don McKellar, premiered on HBO Canada on July 20, 2014. A six-episode second season, with production resuming in spring 2015 in Toronto, premiered on May 15, 2016. On May 7, 2017, the show's official Twitter account informed fans that it was not picked up for a third season.

== Plot summary ==
=== Season 1 ===
Davina, a woman in her 50s who works in a gallery, has recently moved from the suburbs into an apartment in downtown Toronto with her neurotic husband Al, a pop-culture critic. She's having trouble adjusting to life as she gets older, worrying that her looks are fading and that she has accomplished nothing of substance.

=== Season 2 ===
Davina tries to adjust to life as a widow but her progress is hampered by frequent hallucinations of Al. She moves into a houseboat on the Toronto Islands and tries to forge new relationships.

== Cast ==
- Kim Cattrall as Davina Jackson: a middle-aged woman who is having difficulty with aging having been a noted beauty in her youth. She frequently hallucinates conversations with other people in which they give her sage advice or tells her what she wants to hear. Despite caring for her husband Al, she feels as though she could have done better than marry him.
- Don McKellar as Al Jackson, Davina's husband: a neurotic pop-culture columnist who is also somewhat socially awkward.
- Nicolas Wright as Orlando Jackson: Orlando is Davina and Al’s only son. Neurotic and depressive he often blames his parents for the way he feels. He has no sperm count and feels as though his parents resent him for being unable to give them a grandchild.
- Bob Martin as Sam: Davina's friend and employer.
- Colm Feore as Roger: Davina’s brother-in-law who values money above all else but is fired from his well-paying job and turns to art as a way to express himself. As an artist he develops an obsession with Davina who he makes the subject of most of his work.
- Joanna Gleason as Veronica: Davina's conservative older sister who resents her for always getting what she wants.
- Clé Bennett as Theodore: a drug dealer who hangs outside the Jackson's apartment he is befriended by Al and later Davina. He also has his real estate license.
- Marc-André Grondin as Greg: a married archeologist that also teaches piano on the side and seduces his clients' wives. He initially tries to seduce Veronica, but after being fired by Roger is rehired by Davina to teach Al.
- Elliott Gould as Dr. Cass: Al’s opportunistic physician he encourages Al to have a series of expensive medical tests not covered by OHIP.

== Episodes ==
=== Series overview ===
Season	Episodes	Originally aired	
Season	Episodes	First aired	Last aired
1	6	July 20, 2014	August 24, 2014
2	6	May 15, 2016	June 19, 2016

=== Season 1 (2014) ===
No. overall	No. in season	Title	Directed by	Written by	Original release date
1	1	"The Other Davina"	Don McKellar	Bob Martin	July 20, 2014
Davina tries to adjust to life in her new ultra-modern apartment and struggles with the feeling that she is aging. Her husband Al strikes up a friendship with Theodore, the drug dealer who deals outside their tenement building.
2	2	"The Old Woman"	Don McKellar	Bob Martin	July 27, 2014
Davina learns her mother has suffered a fifth stroke and wonders what she wants out of life. Al meets a former fling, Sara Thorn, who is the host of a popular radio show.
3	3	"The Three Sisters"	Don McKellar	Bob Martin	August 3, 2014
At a networking event for Al, Davina meets Bob Ringwald, a culture critic who becomes infatuated with her, and contemplates having an affair. Al thinks he has a brain tumour after his doctor. Dr. Cass (Elliott Gould) notices that his blinking is asymmetrical.
4	4	"The Mummy"	Don McKellar	Bob Martin	August 10, 2014
On a double date with Veronica and Roger, Davina learns that Roger quit the piano lessons that Davina gave him for Christmas because the instructor, Greg, was hitting on Veronica. She then persuades Al to complete the remaining seven lessons.
5	5	"Not the Haitian Corpse"	Don McKellar	Bob Martin	August 17, 2014
Davina's mother dies causing the family to react oddly and for Davina to begin avoiding Roger because she thinks he might want to start an affair with her.
6	6	"The Return of the Other Davina"	Don McKellar	Bob Martin	August 24, 2014
Al catches Davina kissing Greg. Davina moves out of their apartment and into Veronica and Roger's house.

=== Season 2 (2016) ===
No. overall	No. in season	Title	Directed by	Written by	Original release date
7	1	"Episode 201"	Don McKellar	Rosa Labordé	May 15, 2016
Six months after Al's death Davina has difficulty adjusting to life as a widow. She contemplates moving from her apartment.
8	2	"Episode 202"	Don McKellar	Rosa Labordé	May 22, 2016
Davina runs into Sara Thorn who persuades her to take her voice class. She also struggles to unlock Al's password protected laptop.
9	3	"Episode 203"	Don McKellar	Lynn Coady	May 29, 2016
Davina tries to live out her life according to the advice Al left her in a note he wrote before he died. She tries to move on with a fashion consultant named David (Rick Roberts) she meets on the island.
10	4	"Episode 204"	Don McKellar	Lynn Coady	June 5, 2016
Davina begins receiving mysterious calls she thinks are Al trying to contact her from beyond the grave. Orlando returns and Davina has difficulty adjusting to his new girlfriend.
11	5	"Episode 205"	Don McKellar	Susan Coyne	June 12, 2016
Davina reacts badly to the news that Orlando plans on marrying Cheryl. As Roger's case goes to trial Veronica reconnects with Lenny Gordon (Tom McCamus) an old flame.
12	6	"Episode 206"	Don McKellar	Susan Coyne	June 19, 2016
Davina's island neighbour Lizzie commits suicide by drowning and leaves Davina her house boat. Orlando and Cheryl marry.

== Awards ==
The first season of Sensitive Skin was nominated for 6 Canadian Screen Awards, and won four:

- Best Actor in a Continuing Leading Comedic Role (Don McKellar)
- Best Direction in a Comedy Program or Series (Don McKellar)
- Best Photography (Douglas Koch, "The Three Sisters")
- Best Picture Editing in a Comedy Series (Matthew Hannam).
