= Seven Digital Deadly Sins =

- Produced by: National Film Board of Canada
- Release date: 2014

Seven Digital Deadly Sins is a 2014 web documentary, produced by the National Film Board of Canada (NFB) and The Guardian, which explores online behaviour according to the traditional seven deadly sins. It features video confessions by such artists and celebrities as Newfoundland comedian Mary Walsh, Billy Bragg, novelist Gary Shteyngart, comic Josie Long, musician Bill Bailey and writer Jon Ronson. The interactive site also allows users to absolve or condemn various digital "sins" of the day. The site was created in collaboration with Jam3 and produced for the NFB by its Digital Studio in Vancouver, with Loc Dao as executive producer.

Seven Digital Deadly Sins received three People's Voice Awards, chosen by the public online, at the 2015 Webby Awards.
