= Ric Esther Bienstock =

Canadian documentary filmmaker

Ric Esther Bienstock OC
- Born: Montreal, Quebec, Canada
- Occupations: Canadian Film Director & Producer
- Awards: Emmy Award for Outstanding Investigative Journalism, Alfred I. Dupont-Columbia Award, Edward R. Murrow Award, Genie Award for Best Feature Documentary, British Broadcast Award for Best Documentary, Royal Television Society Award and more.

Ric Esther Bienstock OC is a Canadian documentary filmmaker best known for her investigative documentaries. She was born in Montreal, Quebec and studied at Vanier College and McGill University. She has produced and directed an eclectic array of films from investigative social issue documentaries like Sex Slaves, an investigation into the trafficking of women from former Soviet Bloc Countries into the global sex trade and Ebola: Inside an Outbreak which took viewers to ground zero of the Ebola outbreak in Zaire - to lighter fare such as Penn & Teller’s Magic and Mystery Tour.

She was the 2015 recipient of the prestigious Gordon Sinclair Award for Broadcast Journalism from the Canadian Academy of Cinema and Television and was honoured with the Birks Diamond Tribute to the Year's Women in Film at the 2014 Toronto International Film Festival.

She has garnered dozens of awards for her films including a U.S. Emmy for Outstanding Investigative Journalism, two Edward R. Murrow Awards, an Alfred I. Dupont-Columbia Award for Excellence in Broadcast Journalism , a Scripps Howard Award for International Reporting, 2 Geminis, a Genie, a British Broadcast Award, a Royal Television Society Award, an Overseas Press Club of America Award, a Gracie Award, 2 Cine Golden Eagles, 2 Gold Hugos, a Distinguished Documentary Achievement Award from the IDA, 2 Hot Docs Awards, a Gold Worldmedia Award, 2 Amnesty International Awards, 3 Canadian Screen Awards including the Donald Brittain Award for Best Social Issue Documentary and a Cable Ace Award among others. She was also nominated for a BAFTA in the U.K.

== Filmography ==
- AIDS in Africa (1990)
- Burden on the Land (1990)
- Deadly Currents (1991)
- Hurry Up and Wait (1992)
- The Plague Monkeys (1994)
- Ms. Conceptions (1995)
- Ebola: Inside an Outbreak (1996)
- The Money Shot (1999)
- Penn & Teller's Magic and Mystery Tour (2000)
- Boxing: In and Out of the Ring (2001)
- Genius Sperm Bank (2003)
- Impact of Terror (2004)
- Sex Slaves (2006)
- The Lost Tomb of Jesus (2007)
- Beasts of the Bible (2010)
- Finding Atlantis (2011)
- Lost Faces of the Bible (2012)
- The Age of Anxiety (2012)
- Tales from the Organ Trade (2013)
- The Accountant of Auschwitz (2018)
- Enslaved (2020)

== Awards ==
Tales From the Organ Trade

- Edward R. Murrow Award - Overseas Press Club of America
- Emmy Award nomination for Outstanding Investigative Journalism
- Emmy Award nomination for Outstanding Writing
- Scripps Howard, Jack R. Howard Award for International Coverage
- Norman Bethune Award for Excellence in International Health Reporting
- Global Awareness Award, WorldMediaFestival, Germany
- Gold Award, WorldMediaFestival, Germany
- Golden Eagle Award for Investigative Reporting
- Golden Sheaf Award for Best Social/Political, Yorkton Film Festival
- Best "Sign of the Times" - Documentary Edge Festival, New Zealand
- Best Feature Length Film - Docutah
- Best Director - Docutah
- Best Feature Documentary - Tenerife International Film Festival
- Special Jury Award - Nevada International Film Festival
- Honourable Mention - Ojai International Film Festival

The Age of Anxiety

- Banff Rockie Award (2013)

Finding Atlantis

- 2012 Silver World Medal in the "History and Society" category at New York Festivals
- 2011 International Golden Panda Nomination at Sichuan TV Festival
- 2011 Gemini Nomination for "Best History Documentary Program"

Beasts of the Bible

- 2011 Banff Rockie Awards nomination in "Wildlife & Natural History Program" category
- 2011 Intermedia-Globe Silver Award in "Nature & Wildlife" category at World Media Festival
- 2011 Silver Plaque Special Achievement for "Animation/Computer Graphics" at HUGO TV Awards
- 2011 Finalist Award Winner at New York Festivals
- 2011 CINE Golden Eagle Award
- 2011 History Makers Awards Nomination for "Most Innovative Program"

The Lost Tomb of Jesus

- 2008 Gold World Medal at New York Festivals

Sex Slaves

- 2007 Emmy Award in the category of "Outstanding Investigative Journalism"
- 2007 Overseas Press Club Edward R. Murrow Award in the category of "Best TV interpretation or documentary on international affairs"
- 2007 Mission Award at the Woman’s International Film Festival
- 2006 Gemini Nomination for "Best Writing"
- 2006 BAFTA Nomination for "Best Single Documentary"
- 2006 British Broadcast Award in the category of "Best Documentary Programme"
- 2006 UK Royal Television Society Award
- 2006 Gracie Award for Outstanding Documentary in New York
- 2006 Best of the Festival at the U.N. Documentary Film Festival
- 2006 Bulldog Award for "Best Documentary" at Televisual Magazine, U.K.
- 2006 Silver Award at the Worldmedia Festival, Hamburg, Germany
- 2006 Shortlisted for the Prix Italia, Venice, Italy
- 2006 Shortlisted for the Prix Europa, Berlin, Germany

Impact of Terror

- 2006 Grand Award at New York Festivals
- 2006 Gold World Medal at New York Festivals
- 2005 Overseas Press Club of America Award

Penn & Teller’s Magic and Mystery Tour

- 2001 Gold Award at the Worldmedia Festival in Hamburg, Germany

The Money Shot

- 2001 Silver Plaque at the Chicago International Television Festival

Ebola: Inside an Outbreak

- 1997 Gemini Award for "Best Science Documentary"
- 1997 Gemini Award for "Best Science Score"
- 1997 "Best Science Documentary" Hot Docs Canadian International documentary film festival
- 1996 Alfred I. Dupont - Columbia University Award for "TV Journalism"
- 1996 Gold Plaque at the Chicago International Television Festival
- 1996 "Best Achievement in Documentaries" at the Monitor Awards
- 1996 "First Place Freddie Award" from the American Medical Association
- 1996 "Chris Award" at the Columbus International Film Festival

Ms. Conceptions

- 1996 Gemini Award for "Donald Brittain Award for Best Documentary"
- 1996 Gold Plaque at the Chicago Film Festival
- 1996 Silver Apple from the National Educational Media Network
- 1995 Distinguished Documentary Achievement Award from IDA Association, Los Angeles

The Plague Monkeys

- 1996 Emmy Award
- 1995 CableAce Award for "Best Documentary"
- 1995 Gemini Award
- 1995 Gold Special Jury Award at the Houston International Film Festival
- 1995 Gold Apple from the National Educational Media Network
- 1995 "Chris Award" at the Columbus International Film Festival
- 1995 Silver Hugo at the Chicago International Film & Video Festival

Deadly Currents

- 1994 CableAce Award for "Best International Documentary Special"
- 1992 Genie Award for "Best Feature Documentary"
- 1992 Gold Hugo at the Chicago International Film Festival
- 1992 Gold Award at the Houston International Film Festival
- 1992 Nominated for "Peace Prize" at the Berlin Film Festival
- 1991 Grand Prix at the Nyon International Documentary Festival
- 1991 "Chris Award" at the Columbus International Film Festival

Hurry Up and Wait

- 1995 Silver Medal at Prix Leonardo, Italy
- 1994 Gold Award at the Houston International Film Festival
- 1993 Silver Hugo for "Best Direction" Medicine, Chicago
- 1993 Bronze Medal at the International Film & TV Festival of New York
- 1993 Certificate of Merit at Intercom, Chicago
- 1993 Honorable Mention at the Columbus International Film Festival

Burden on the Land

- 1991 Silver Medal at the Houston International Film Festival
- 1991 Red Ribbon Award at the American Film Festival
- 1991 Silver Screen Award at the U.S. Film & Video Festival

AIDS in Africa

- 1990 Gold Hugo at the Chicago International Film Festival
- 1990 First Place Gold at the John Muir Film Festival, 1990
- 1990 Gold Hugo at the Chicago Film Festival
- 1990 Silver Medal at the International Film & TV Festival of New York
- 1990 Bronze Plaque at the Columbus International Film Festival
