= James Cameron filmography =

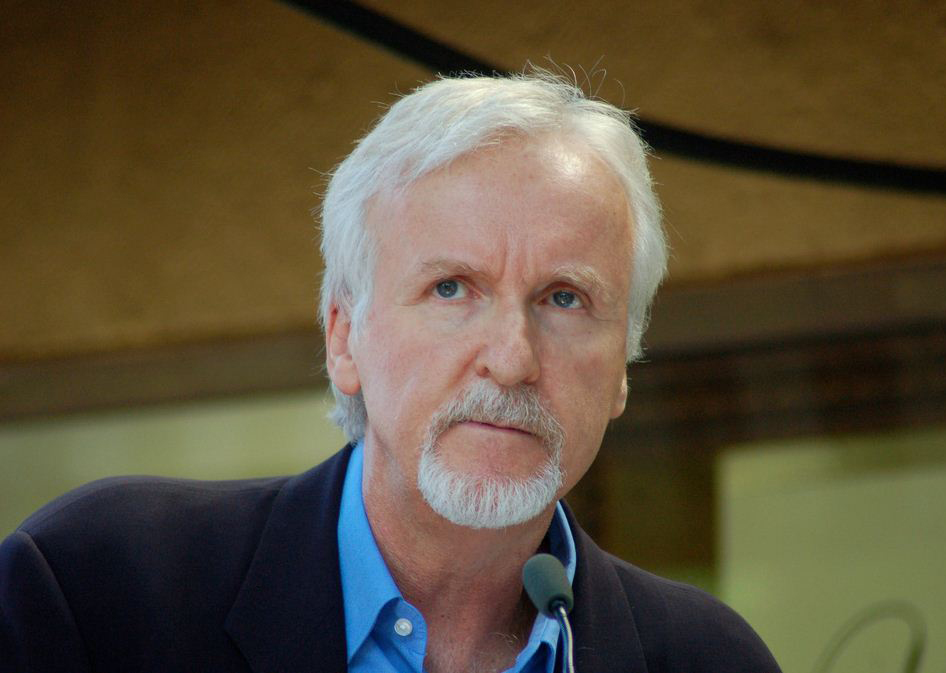
Cameron speaking at the Hollywood Walk of Fame awarding ceremony of producer Gale Anne Hurd in 2012

James Cameron is a Canadian filmmaker who has had an extensive career in film and television. Cameron's debut was the 1978 science fiction short Xenogenesis, which he directed, wrote and produced. In his early career, he did various technical jobs such as special visual effects producer, set dresser assistant, matte artist, and photographer. His feature directorial debut was the 1982 release Piranha II: The Spawning. The next film he directed was the science fiction action thriller The Terminator (1984) which starred Arnold Schwarzenegger as the titular cyborg assassin, and was Cameron's breakthrough feature. In 1986, he directed and wrote the science fiction action sequel Aliens starring Sigourney Weaver. He followed this by directing another science fiction film The Abyss (1989). In 1991, Cameron directed the sequel to The Terminator, Terminator 2: Judgment Day (with Schwarzenegger reprising his role), and also executive produced the action crime film Point Break. Three years later, he directed a third Schwarzenegger-starring action film True Lies (1994).

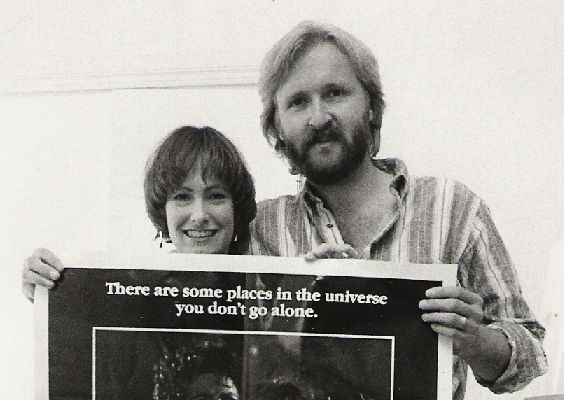
Cameron (right) with his then wife and Aliens producer Gale Anne Hurd (left) in 1986

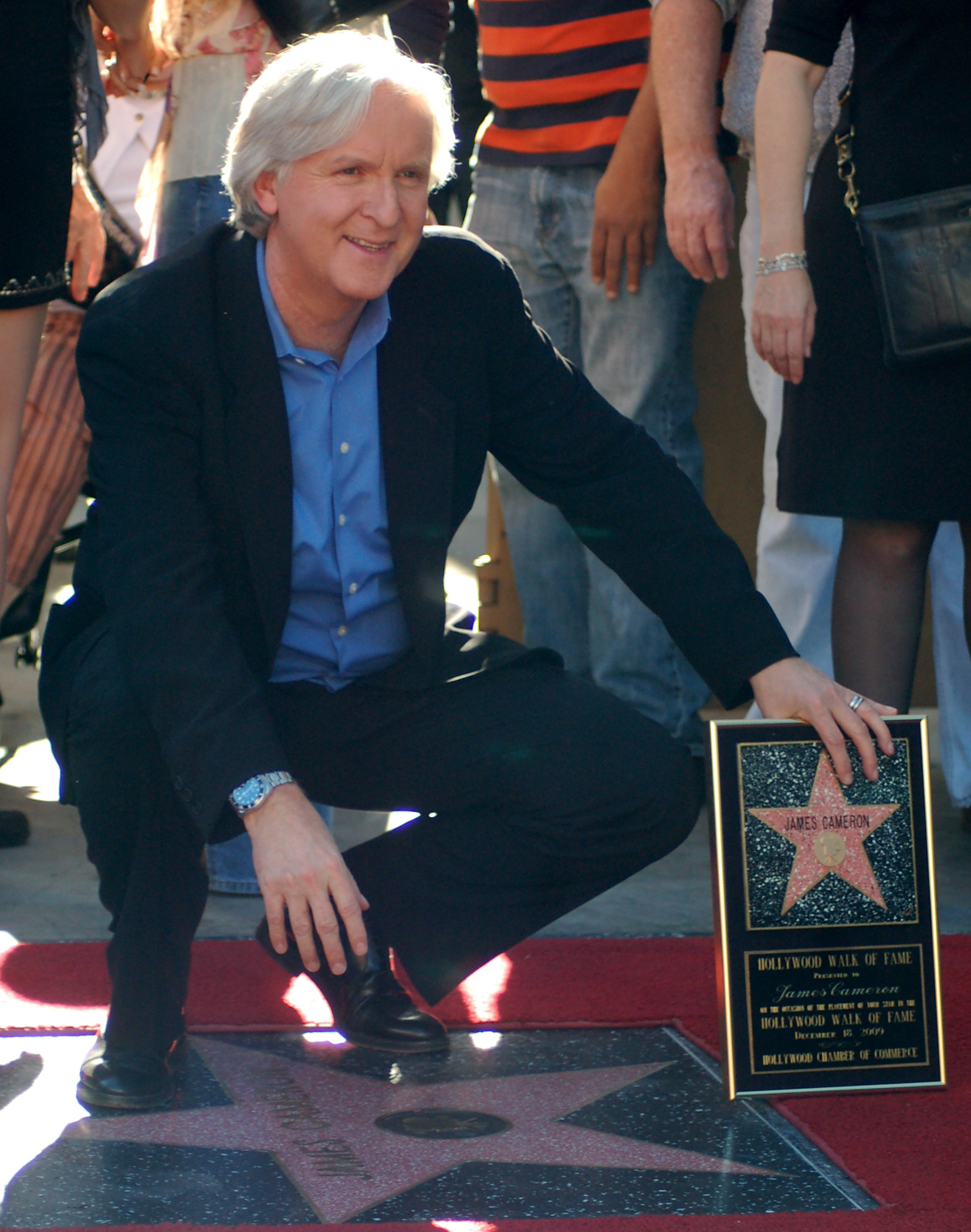
Cameron receiving a star on the Hollywood Walk of Fame in 2009

In 1997, Cameron directed, wrote, and produced the epic romantic disaster film Titanic which grossed over $1.8 billion (Note: A worldwide 3D rerelease of the film in 2012 increased this total to over $2.2 billion.) at the worldwide box-office and became the highest grossing of all time. (Note: This record was held until 2010 when it was surpassed by the 3D science fiction film Avatar also directed by Cameron.) He received the Academy Award for Best Director, the Academy Award for Best Film Editing, and shared the Academy Award for Best Picture with the other producers. It had a total of 14 Oscar nominations (tying the record set by the 1950 drama All About Eve) and won 11 (tying the record set by the 1959 epic historical drama Ben-Hur). Cameron also won the Golden Globe Award for Best Director and shared the Golden Globe Award for Best Motion Picture – Drama with the other producers. He followed this by directing, and producing two underwater documentaries: Ghosts of the Abyss (2003), and Aliens of the Deep (2005). He returned to directing features in 2009 with the 3D science fiction film Avatar. It grossed over $2.9 billion at the worldwide box-office and became the highest grossing of all time surpassing Titanic. (Note: The film was surpassed by Avengers: Endgame in 2019. Avatar became highest grossing again in 2021 after a Chinese rerelease.) Avatar was nominated for nine Academy Awards and won three in technical categories. Cameron also earned a second Golden Globe Award for Best Director, and Best Motion Picture – Drama. He followed this by executive producing two 3D films, Sanctum (2011) and Cirque du Soleil: Worlds Away (2012), as well as the documentary Deepsea Challenge 3D (2014). Cameron directed Avatar: The Way of Water (2022), a sequel to Avatar (2009), which was the highest-grossing film of the year with over $2.3 billion at the worldwide box-office. It received generally positive reviews and was nominated for the Academy Award for Best Picture and won the Academy Award for Best Visual Effects. A third film in the Avatar series, Avatar: Fire and Ash, was released on December 19, 2025.

Cameron made his television debut in 1998 playing himself in the sitcom Mad About You. Two years later, he executive produced the science fiction television series Dark Angel (2000) starring Jessica Alba. In 2005, he appeared in two documentaries about the sinking of the RMS Titanic: Last Mysteries of the Titanic, and Tony Robinson's Titanic Adventure. He also made appearances as himself on the comedy-drama television series Entourage that same year. Cameron followed this by executive producing two biblical documentaries, The Exodus Decoded (2006) and Lost Tomb of Jesus (2007). He executive produced and appeared in a third Titanic related documentary, Titanic: Final Word with James Cameron, in 2012. Two years later, Cameron executive produced the climate change documentary television series Years of Living Dangerously (2014) which received the Primetime Emmy Award for Outstanding Documentary or Nonfiction Series.

== Film ==
Key
†	Denotes films that have not yet been released

=== Feature films ===
Year	Title	Credited as				Notes	Ref(s)
Year	Title	Director	Writer	Producer	Editor	Notes	Ref(s)
1978	Xenogenesis	Yes	Yes	Yes	Yes	Short film Co-directed and co-written with Randall Frakes; Also cinematographer, production designer and visual effects producer	
1982	Piranha II: The Spawning	Yes	Yes (Note: Credited as "H.A. Hamilton" with Charles H. Eglee.)	No	No	Co-written with Charles H. Eglee and Ovidio G. Assonitis (uncredited)	
1984	The Terminator	Yes	Yes	No	No	Co-written with Gale Anne Hurd; Inducted into the National Film Registry in 2008	
1985	Rambo: First Blood Part II	No	Yes	No	No	Co-written with Sylvester Stallone	
1986	Aliens	Yes	Yes	No	No		
1989	The Abyss	Yes	Yes	No	No		
1991	Terminator 2: Judgment Day	Yes	Yes	Yes	No	Co-written with William Wisher Jr. Inducted into the National Film Registry in 2023	
1991	Point Break	No	Uncredited (Note: In December 2025, James Cameron claimed that he "wrote Point Break" and was unjustly denied a credit by the WGA, stating, "I flat out got stiffed by the Writers Guild on that. It was bullshit." Credited screenwriter W. Peter Iliff responded by acknowledging that Cameron added scenes to the script in his capacity as executive producer—noting that this is "commonplace on studio pictures"—but that he did not add enough material to earn a screenwriting credit under WGA rules. Iliff said that he "always make[s] sure to give Jim credit when publicly asked to speak about the film", but pointed out that the WGA had access to every draft of the screenplay when making their decision.)	Executive	No		
1994	True Lies	Yes	Yes	Yes	Uncredited		
1995	Strange Days	No	Yes	Yes	Uncredited	Co-written with Jay Cocks	
1997	Titanic	Yes	Yes	Yes	Yes	Also director of photography for the Titanic deep dive scenes Inducted into the National Film Registry in 2017	
2002	Solaris	No	No	Yes	No		
2009	Avatar	Yes	Yes	Yes	Yes		
2019	Alita: Battle Angel	No	Yes	Yes	No	Co-written with Laeta Kalogridis	
2019	Terminator: Dark Fate	No	Story	Yes	No	Story co-written with Charles H. Eglee, Josh Friedman, David S. Goyer and Justin Rhodes	
2022	Avatar: The Way of Water	Yes	Yes	Yes	Yes	Co-written with Rick Jaffa and Amanda Silver	
2025	Avatar: Fire and Ash	Yes	Yes	Yes	Yes	Co-written with Rick Jaffa and Amanda Silver	

==== Executive producer only ====
Year	Film	Notes	Ref.
2011	Sanctum		
2012	Cirque du Soleil: Worlds Away		
2026	Painter	Post-Production	

=== Other roles ===
Year	Film	Role	Ref.
1979	Rock 'n' Roll High School	Uncredited production assistant	
1980	Happy Birthday, Gemini	Set dresser assistant	
1980	Battle Beyond the Stars	Photographer, art director and miniatures designer	
1981	Escape from New York	Special visual effects photographer and matte artist	
1981	Galaxy of Terror	Second unit director and production designer	
1982	Android	Design consultant	
2024	Alien: Romulus	Uncredited creative consultant	

=== Documentary film ===
Year	Title	Credited as			Notes	Ref(s)
Year	Title	Director	Producer	Himself	Notes	Ref(s)
2003	Ghosts of the Abyss	Yes	Yes	Yes	Also Reality Camera System designer	
2003	Volcanoes of the Deep Sea	No	Executive	No	IMAX only	
2004	The Cutting Edge: The Magic of Movie Editing	No	No	Yes		
2005	Aliens of the Deep	Yes	Yes	Yes	Co-directed with Steven Quale; Also cinematographer	
2006	Explorers: From the Titanic to the Moon	No	No	Yes		
2012	Side by Side	No	No	Yes		
2014	Deepsea Challenge 3D	No	Executive	Yes		
2015	Beyond Glory	No	Executive	No		
2016	Score: A Film Music Documentary	No	No	Yes		
2018	The Game Changers	No	Executive	No		
2020	Akashinga: The Brave Ones	No	Executive	No		
2021	The Six	No	Executive	Yes		
2024	Modern Masters: S. S. Rajamouli	No	No	Yes		
2026	Billie Eilish – Hit Me Hard and Soft: The Tour (Live in 3D)	Yes	Yes	Yes	Concert film	
TBA	The Game Changers 2	No	Executive	No		

== Television ==
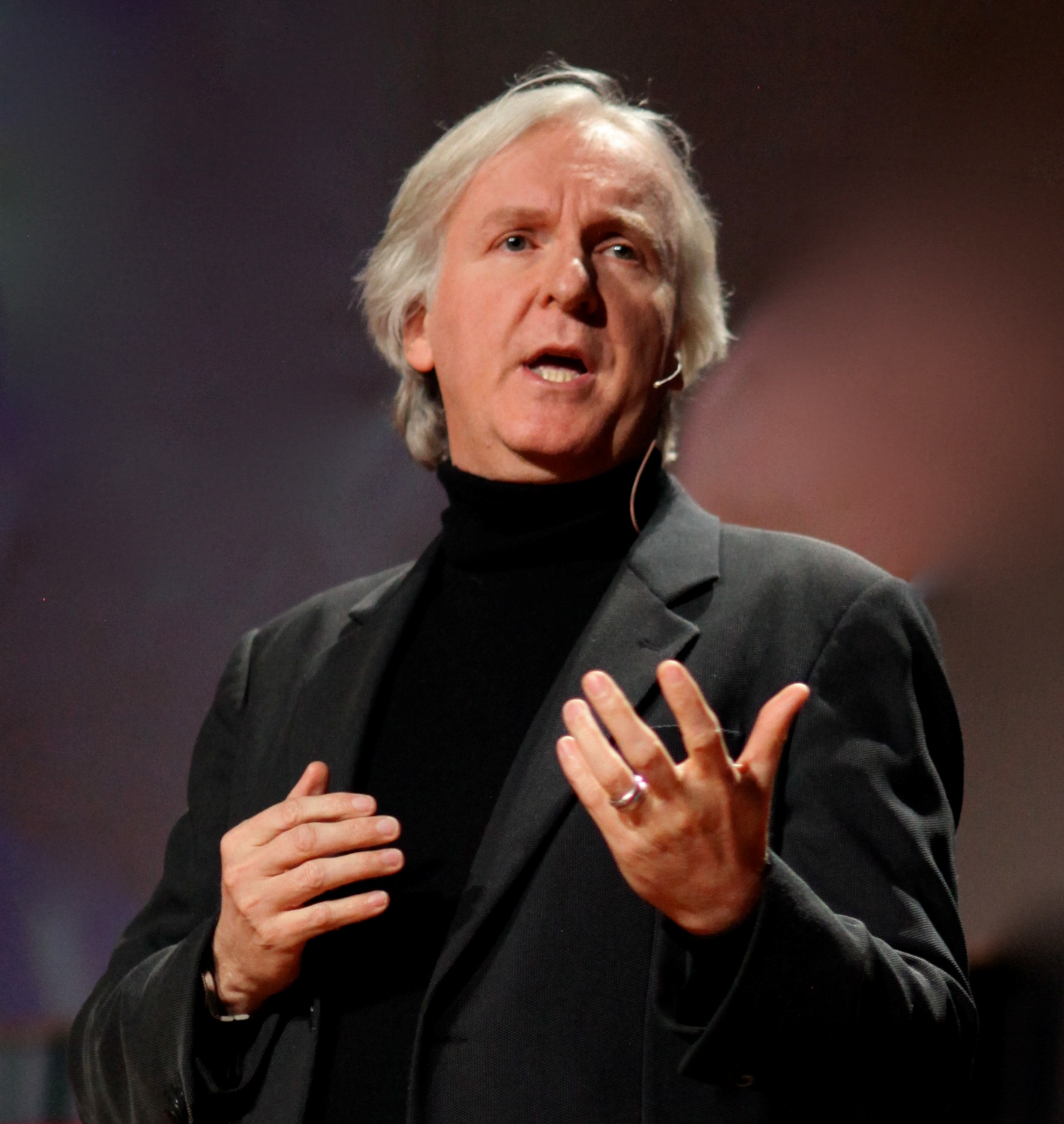
Cameron speaking at the 2010 TED Conference

Year(s)	Title	Role	Notes	Ref(s)
1998	Mad About You	Himself	Episode: "The Finale"	
2000–2002	Dark Angel	—	Executive producer Episode: "Pilot" (writer); Episode: "Freak Nation" (director and writer)	
2005–2006	Entourage	Himself	4 episodes	
2023	True Lies	—	Executive producer Characters	

=== Documentary film ===
Year	Title	Director	Producer	Himself	Notes	Ref(s)
2002	Expedition: Bismarck	Yes	Yes	No	Co-directed with Gary Johnstone	
2005	Last Mysteries of the Titanic	Yes	Yes	No		
2005	Tony Robinson's Titanic Adventure	No	No	Yes		
2006	The Exodus Decoded	No	Executive	No		
2007	The Lost Tomb of Jesus	No	Executive	No		
2010	Avatar: Creating the World of Pandora	No	No	Yes		
2012	Titanic: The Final Word with James Cameron	No	No	Yes		
2012	James Cameron: Voyage to the Bottom of the Earth	No	No	Yes		
2013	A New Age of Exploration: National Geographic at 125	No	No	Yes		
2017	Titanic: 20 Years Later with James Cameron	No	No	Yes		
2023	Titanic: 25 Years Later with James Cameron	No	Executive	Yes		

=== Documentary series ===
Year	Title	Executive Producer	Host	Ref(s)
2014	Years of Living Dangerously	Yes	No	
2018	James Cameron's Story of Science Fiction	Yes	Yes	
2021	Secrets of the Whales	Yes	No	
2022	Super/Natural	Yes	No	
2023	Secrets of the Elephants	Yes	No	
2024	Secrets of the Octopus	Yes	No	
2024	OceanXplorers	Yes	No	
2025	Secrets of the Penguins	Yes	No	

== See also ==
- James Cameron's unrealized projects
