= James Cameron's unrealized projects =

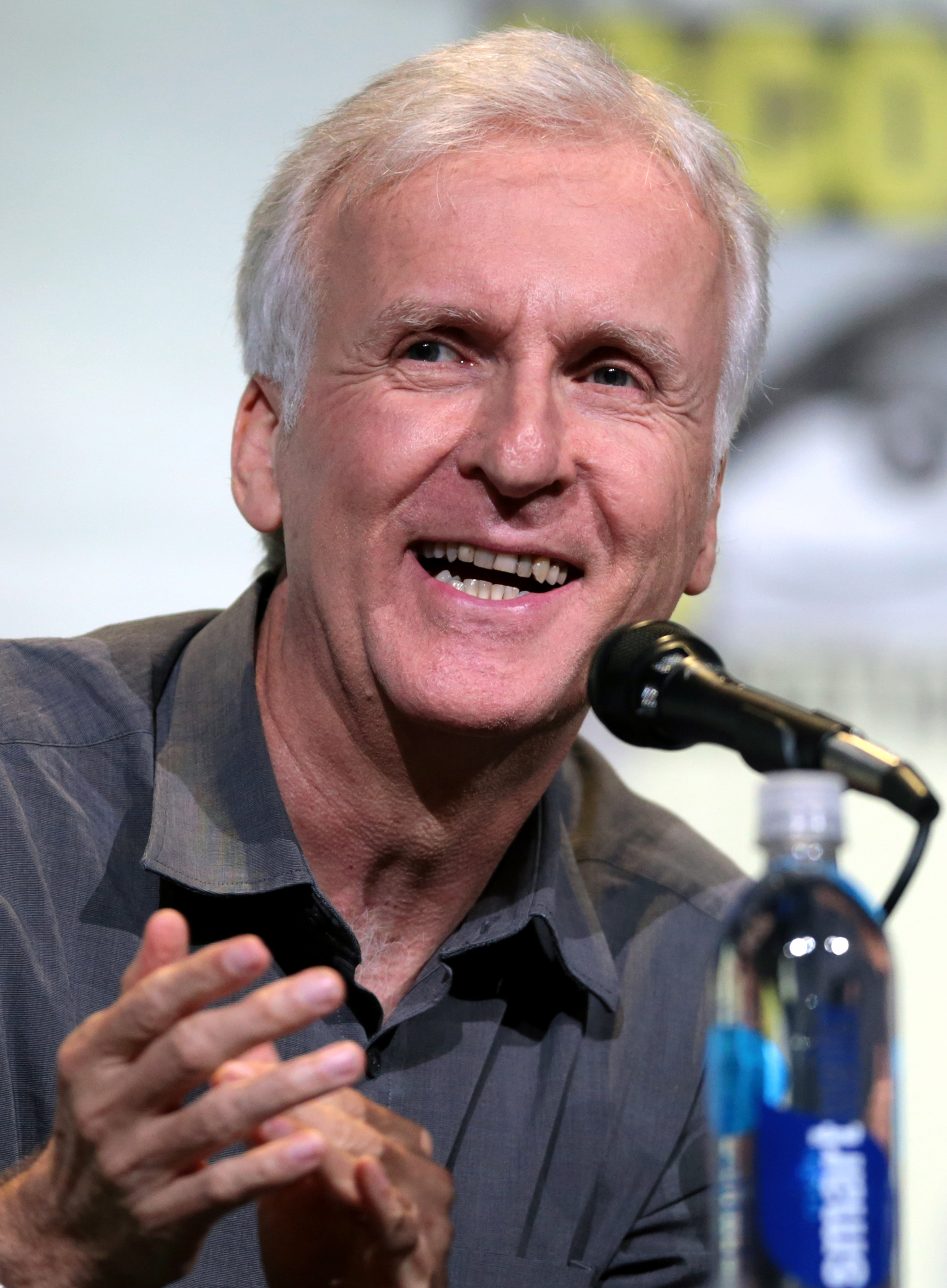
Cameron at the 2016 San Diego Comic-Con for "Aliens: 30th Anniversary".

During his long career, Canadian film director James Cameron has worked on a number of projects which never progressed beyond the pre-production stage under his direction. Some of these projects fell into development hell or are officially cancelled.

== 1970s ==
=== Untitled transcendental film ===
While in college, Cameron co-authored a script about a wheelchair-bound man who has all his sensory organs surgically removed so that he can go deep within his own subconscious.

== 1980s ==
=== Mother ===
In the early 1980s, Cameron worked on a project that he originally called E.T., but was forced to rename it Mother when Steven Spielberg was announced to be making E.T. the Extra-Terrestrial. Though Mother was never produced, Cameron claimed that elements of it were incorporated into Avatar.

=== Alien Nation ===
An earlier draft of the 1988 film Alien Nation was actually written by Cameron in 1987, but his name, however, was not credited in the final cut of the film. Rockne S. O'Bannon received solo credit of writing the script, which deviated much from earlier drafts.

== 1990s ==
=== Jurassic Park ===
In May 1990, Cameron attempted to buy the rights to make a film adaptation of Michael Crichton's novel Jurassic Park. However, Steven Spielberg bought the rights by a mere few hours before Cameron could do so. The film released in 1993 and was directed by Spielberg. In an Empire magazine interview, Cameron conceded, "[Spielberg] was the right guy to make it. Not me, because I would have made it too terrifying and R-rated. It would have been Aliens (1986) with dinosaurs."

=== Spider-Man ===
After finishing the filming of True Lies, on September 1, 1993, Variety reported that Cameron had sent a screenplay (apparently written in 1991) to Carolco Pictures for the long-planned live-action adaptation of the Marvel Comics character Spider-Man, a theatrical project that had been in production hell since 1985. Leonardo DiCaprio was attached to play Spider-Man, and Cameron's frequent collaborator Arnold Schwarzenegger was attached to play Doctor Octopus. Cameron's planned screenplay featured a darker, R-rated and mature re-imagining of the classic Spider-Man origin story, with the storyline focusing on academically-gifted, yet outcast high school student: Peter Parker, being bitten by a mutated spider during a scientific demonstration, which later results in Parker developing spider-like superhuman abilities. After initially attempting to use his abilities for personal gain, his selfishness leads to him encountering and refusing to stop an armed robber from escaping from a local TV station, which later results in the tragic murder of his adoptive father-figure/uncle: Ben Parker. Guilt-ridden, Peter is later driven to use his new abilities as a masked vigilante: "Spider-Man", to atone for his partial responsibility in his uncle's death. While balancing high school life, Peter struggles to do good and help others under his Spider-Man alter-ego, while vying for the attentions of his classmate and crush: Mary Jane-Watson, with whom he develops a blossoming romance. Cameron's script also contained heavy profanity, mature themes, sexual content and a significantly grittier, edgier and adult-oriented tone and direction, compared to other cinematic Spider-Man adaptations. However, after problems that producer Menahem Golan had with Carolco (which ended in the bankruptcy of the latter), Cameron left the project and signed a contract with 20th Century Fox. The film was finally released in 2002 directed by Sam Raimi and written by David Koepp.

=== The Crowded Room ===
In 1991, after finishing the filming of Terminator 2: Judgment Day, Cameron tried to get the rights of Daniel Keyes' non-fiction novel The Minds of Billy Milligan. In 1994, Keyes published a sequel novel entitled The Milligan Wars, stating that he published the novel for being a tie-in with the film adaptation, entitled The Crowded Room, which would be developed by Warner Bros. and with Cameron attached to direct, after buying the rights of the novel to Sandy Arcara. John Cusack was attached to play Billy Milligan and Cameron and Todd Graff wrote the screenplay. However, Cameron finally left the project, stating, "I entered an arrangement with a partner. We had joint control of the material. This partner turned out to be someone I couldn't work with and who felt that they couldn't work with me. We parted ways. A script had been written, we'd cast John Cusack to play the guy, and I was in pre-production. I was ready to go shoot… I will say that I believe this person behaved very unprofessionally." In December 2006, veteran film director Joel Schumacher was attached to direct the film, with a projected release date of 2008, but the project remained unfinished. In 2015, Leonardo DiCaprio announced that his company Appian Way Productions was producing The Crowded Room, with DiCaprio set to star. In 2021, Akiva Goldsman began developing the work as a miniseries with Tom Holland in the lead. It was released in 2023.

=== Terminator 3 ===
During the 1990s, Cameron said many times that he was interested in directing a third Terminator film. After the bankruptcy of Carolco Pictures in 1997, the developer of Terminator 2: Judgment Day, Cameron and 20th Century Fox were in talks about the production of a possible third Terminator film. However, at the end, Cameron left the production of the third film to direct Titanic. Arnold Schwarzenegger originally intended to not reprise his role as The Terminator after learning that Cameron was not going to direct the film and tried to convince him to work at least as producer, but Cameron declined. The film was finally released as Terminator 3: Rise of the Machines in 2003 and directed by Jonathan Mostow. Cameron co-wrote and co-produced his vision with Terminator: Dark Fate, which ignores Terminator 3: Rise of the Machines, Terminator Salvation and Terminator Genisys, picking up after Terminator 2: Judgment Day. The film was released in United States by Paramount Pictures and internationally by 20th Century Fox (through Walt Disney Studios Motion Pictures via Buena Vista International) on November 1, 2019.

=== Project 880 ===
In 1994, Cameron finished the screenplay of Project 880, his next planned film. The script was about a man named Josh Sully traveling to the planet Pandora and falling in love with the native alien Zuleika. In August 1996, Cameron stated that he would direct Project 880 after finishing the filming of Titanic, and that the film would be released in 1999. However, Cameron felt that the technology of that time was not enough and realistic for the project, putting it on hold. Finally, in October 2005, 20th Century Fox greenlit the production of the project. Jon Landau was to produce the film. However, Cameron made many changes to the Project 880 script, and it was finally released in 2009 as Avatar.

=== The Mummy ===
In December 1995, 20th Century Fox acquired the film rights to Anne Rice's The Mummy from Carolco with Cameron set to direct before the rights lapsed.

=== Planet of the Apes ===
In 1996, Cameron intended to direct a reboot of Planet of the Apes, after the poor reception of Battle for the Planet of the Apes in 1973. In 1998, Cameron was to write and produce the movie, while Peter Hyams was to direct the film and Arnold Schwarzenegger was to star in the role of George Taylor. According to Cameron, he had great ideas for the movie, including Caesar traveling in time and discovering an ape society more technologically advanced. However, Cameron left the project after the successful reception of Titanic. The reboot was finally released in 2001 and directed by Tim Burton.

=== Fantastic Voyage ===
In 1997, Cameron expressed his desire to direct a remake of Richard Fleischer's Fantastic Voyage, but he left the project to focus on Project 880. Despite this, he still planned to make a remake based on his script. In 2007, 20th Century Fox hired Roland Emmerich to direct a remake with Cameron as writer, but Emmerich left due to creative differences with Cameron. In spring 2010, Paul Greengrass revealed his intentions to direct a remake with Cameron as producer and Shane Salerno as writer, but he was eventually replaced by Shawn Levy, who intended to shoot the film in stereoscopic 3-D. On January 7, 2016, it was revealed that Mexican film director Guillermo del Toro is attached to direct the film, along the announcement that David S. Goyer and Justin Rhodes will be the writers and that Cameron will produce the film with his production company Lightstorm Entertainment. In August 2017, it was reported that del Toro had postponed working on the film to completely focus on his film The Shape of Water. In April 2024, Cameron offered an update on the project: "we plan to go ahead with it very soon." In December 2025, Cameron noted that there was a new script in the works with a new director.

=== Dungeons & Dragons ===
In 1997, Cameron was attached to a film adaptation of Dungeons & Dragons just before he did Titanic (1997), but the deal did not suffice due to TSR, Inc.'s failure to come up with a merchandising deal that appealed to 20th Century Fox, where Cameron worked. Potential deals with Paramount Pictures and Lightstorm Entertainment were also destroyed due to strong disagreements on how to finance the film.

=== Solaris ===
In 1998, Cameron was looking to remake Andrei Tarkovsky's Solaris. His production company Lightstorm Entertainment spent close to five years securing the rights with both the novel's author Stanisław Lem and the film's production studio Mosfilm. However, because of his many commitments in the 1990s, Cameron was unable to take on directing duties. In 2000, around the time Steven Soderbergh was working on Traffic, Soderbergh pitched his ideas of a Solaris film adaptation to Cameron and Lightstorm producers Rae Sanchini and Jon Landau. Cameron was thrilled with what he heard and development began on the project. The film was released in 2002, directed and written by Soderbergh. After seeing the film, Cameron stated: "What I would've done would’ve been more like The Abyss, where visual set pieces might have gotten in the way of what is a clean line as a relationship film. [Soderbergh]'s not interested in the hardware or the visual effects very much, which is good.

=== Bright Angel Falling ===
In 1998, Cameron began working on a screenplay titled Bright Angel Falling, with the help of fellow writer-director and friend Peter Hyams. The script tells the story of a massive meteor on a collision course with the Earth and the efforts of a team of brave astronauts to stop it, while also detailing the main characters' personal struggles and issues. However the script got leaked online before the film could enter production and the project was abandoned.

== 2000s ==
=== Untitled World War II film ===
In January 2001, Ain't It Cool News reported that Cameron was interested in directing a screenplay by William Wisher about B-24 Liberation Bombers during World War II. While Cameron liked the screenplay, he decided not to do it, and went off to work on other projects. According to Wisher, 20th Century Fox still has the rights to the project.

=== True Lies 2 ===
After the successful reception of his True Lies film, Cameron and Arnold Schwarzenegger decided to make a sequel entitled True Lies 2, with a script written by Jeff Eastin. Cameron planned to release it after directing Titanic, with a potential release date in 2002. Schwarzenegger was attached to reprise his role as Harry Tasker/Harry Rehnquist. Also, Tom Arnold, who portrayed Albert 'Gib' Gibson in the original film, revealed at one point that the sequel's script was written. However, the production of the sequel was cancelled.

=== Alien 5 ===
In an interview on January 23, 2002, Ridley Scott expressed interest in making a fifth installment of the Alien film franchise. He stated that the fifth film would explain the Aliens' origins and where they were discovered. Alien: Resurrection screenwriter Joss Whedon had previously written a script for the film, but Sigourney Weaver disliked it. Cameron also discussed his possible return as director for the installment, but he finally decided to only work on the project as writer and producer (because he worked on the film's story). Weaver was attached to reprise her role as Ellen Ripley. However, the project was finally shelved by 20th Century Fox since they felt that they would ruin the franchise with a fifth film. The film would eventually become the prequel Prometheus. In 2004, Alien vs. Predator was released instead, as the first installment of the Alien vs. Predator spin-off franchise. Despite Weaver's and Michael Biehn's hopes to reprise their roles and director Neill Blomkamp's hopes to direct the film, on May 1, 2017, Scott stated that Alien 5, whose title would have been Alien: Awakening, was officially cancelled. In October 2018, Weaver stated that Cameron wanted it to be produced. In February 2019, Cameron stated that he was working on reviving the project.

=== Battle Angel Alita ===
On April 17, 2003, it was reported by Moviehole that Cameron had signed with 20th Century Fox to direct a film adaptation of the Yukito Kishiro's manga Battle Angel Alita. On November 22, 2004, Cameron stated that the film would be released after finishing the filming of his documentary film Aliens of the Deep. However, on June 16, 2005, The Hollywood Reporter reported that the production of Battle Angel Alita would be delayed since Cameron decided to first direct Project 880 (which would later become Avatar). On June 29, 2006, Cameron stated that Battle Angel Alita would be the first film of a trilogy. After other delays, like Cameron's work on the first two Avatar sequels, Cameron finally left the project. However, it was finally revealed on October 14, 2015, that the film would be released on December 21, 2018, with Robert Rodriguez as director and Cameron as producer, along with frequent collaborator producer Jon Landau. On September 28, 2018, the film was pushed back to February 14, 2019. The film held its world premiere on January 31, 2019, at the Odeon Leicester Square in London, and was released in the United States on February 14, 2019.

=== The Dive ===
In August 2003, it was reported that Cameron would write, direct and co-produce a film at 20th Century Fox about husband-and-wife freedivers Francisco "Pipin" Ferreras and Audrey Mestre. Based on Ferreras' own autobiography The Dive, the project was to chart their love affair up until the death of Mestre, who died while attempting to break her own record of diving to a depth of 557 feet on a single breath of air. Cameron was expected to shoot Ferraras' October 12 attempt to equal his wife's record; the footage for which would serve as a finale for the film. Since then, Dana Stevens was brought aboard to write the screenplay and, by 2015, Cameron had stepped down as director; opting to just produce through his Lightstorm Entertainment banner along with Rae Sanchini and Barry Josephson. Francis Lawrence was announced to take the helm in his place and Jennifer Lawrence was cast to play Mestre.

=== Heavy Metal ===
In March 2008, Variety reported that Paramount Pictures was set to make another animated film with David Fincher "spearheading the project". Kevin Eastman, who is the current owner and publisher of Heavy Metal, will direct a segment, as will Tim Miller, "whose Blur Studio will handle the animation for what is being conceived as an R-rated, adult-themed feature". Entertainment website IGN announced, on July 14, 2008" "David Fincher's edgy new project has suffered a serious setback after it was dropped by Paramount, according to Entertainment Weekly." However, Entertainment Weekly quoted Tim Miller as saying "David really believes in the project. It's just a matter of time."

In September 2008, Eastman was quoted as saying: "Fincher is directing one, Guillermo del Toro wants to direct one, Zack Snyder wants to direct one, Gore Verbinski wants to direct one". It was reported that the film had been moved to Sony division Columbia Pictures (which had released the original) and had a budget of $50 million. In June 2009, Eastman said "I've got breaking news that Fincher and Cameron are going to be co-executive producers on the film, Cameron will direct one. Mark Osborne and Jack Black from Tenacious D were going to do a comedy segment for the film."

However, production is stalled indefinitely, as no film distributor or production company has shown interest in distributing or producing the remake since Paramount Pictures decided to forgo being the film's distributor, who purportedly thought such a film was "too risqué for mainstream audiences". In July 2011, filmmaker Robert Rodriguez announced at San Diego Comic-Con that he had purchased the film rights to Heavy Metal and planned to develop a new animated film at the new Quick Draw Studios. However, on March 11, 2014, with the formation of his very own television network, El Rey, Rodriguez considered switching gears and bringing it to TV.

=== Doomsday Protocol ===
In December 2009, Cameron was developing a script called Doomsday Protocol for Fox. There have been no further announcements.

== 2010s ==
=== Ghosts of Hiroshima ===
In January 2010, Variety reported that Cameron used his own money to option the nonfiction book The Last Train from Hiroshima by Charles R. Pellegrino, about the survivors of the atomic bombings of Hiroshima and Nagasaki, as a potential directing vehicle. The previous month, he visited Tsutomu Yamaguchi—a Japanese engineer who survived both atomic blasts in 1945—in the hospital, days before he died. Shortly after the publication of The Last Train from Hiroshima, Cameron confirmed that he would use it as the basis for a feature film: "It's a subject that I've wanted to do a film about, that I've been wrestling with how to do it, over the years, and I don't have an answer yet," he said. "[Pellegrino's] book is one of presumably many sources that I'll use for information to be as historically accurate as possible." Later that same year, Entertainment Weekly reported that Cameron was working on the film and contemplated shooting it in 3D, before decided against it. After the release of Avatar: The Way of Water (2022), Cameron said in an interview with Los Angeles Times that he would likely adapt it before the release of Avatar 4 (2029), saying "the Hiroshima film would be as timely as ever, if not more so". In 2024, Deadline Hollywood confirmed that Cameron had purchased the rights of not only The Last Train from Hiroshima, but also of Pellegrino's then-forthcoming Ghosts of Hiroshima, to make an "uncompromising theatrical epic motion picture" titled Last Train from Hiroshima which he would shoot as soon as the Avatar sequels' production permits. Of the penultimate film, Cameron said of his vision:

I want to keep it very focused on the day of the two bombs and the immediate aftermath. [...] I don't want to get into the politics of, should it have been dropped, should they have done it, and all the bad things Japan did to warrant it, or any of that kind of moralizing and politicizing. I just want to deal in a sense with what happened, almost as if you could somehow be there and survive and see it. [...] this may be a movie that I make that makes the least [money] of any movie I've ever made, because I'm not going to be sparing, I'm not going to be circumspect. I want to do for what happened at Hiroshima and Nagasaki, what Steven Spielberg did with the Holocaust and D-Day with Saving Private Ryan. He showed it the way it happened.

As I get into the production on the film, I'll be dealing with true experts on the Japanese side, the families of some of the survivors that Charlie has interviewed, because the survivors themselves are all gone now. That chapter of living history has closed. I'll try to be accurate and, again, utterly apolitical. I want to follow these two disparate events that happen three days apart. What do they have in common? Both involved nuclear weapons launched against human targets. There's this guy who was there for both explosions, who rigged the altimeter on the two bombs and had to be in both planes. I think it's interesting to follow his story as well because he went through an evolution as well. His name was Jacob Beser, an engineer from Los Alamos who actually rigged the altimeter that armed and detonated the weapons. He was on both flights. So there's a slightly American perspective on this as well. Once again, I'm not going to politicize it. He was just there to do a job, but he was a witness and these other people were witnesses. I don't want to do a follow fifty stories; I want to follow a few handful of stories that you can invest in.

I can't tell you today what's going to be in the movie. I've been making notes for fifteen years and I haven't written a word of the script yet because there's a point where it's all there and then you start to write. That's how I always work. I explore around, I remember the things that impact me. I start to assemble 'em into a narrative. And then there's a moment where you're ready to write. And I'm not in that head space right now. [...] I think it's important for people to be aware. I want to make the movie so that people in a movie theater feel they've just been through this experience. And then I think the film, I don't want to give away the ending, but I think the film ends with a card that says "The weapons currently deployed in the world today are from a thousand to ten thousand times the power of the Hiroshima bomb and the Nagasaki bomb."

Speaking exclusively to DiscussingFilm while helping to promote the August release of Ghosts of Hiroshima, Cameron confessed that his upcoming film adaptation of the book might be the most challenging creative venture of his entire filmmaking career:

This might be the most challenging film I ever make. I don't 100% have my strategy fully in place [right now] for how I want to see it, for how I want to shield people from the horror, but still be honest. Also, for how I can find some kind of poetry, beauty, or spiritual epiphany in it somehow, which I know must be there. It's there in every human story. So, it's going to be very challenging. I might not even be up to the task, but that never stopped me before.

Steven Spielberg—whose films Schindler's List (1993) and Saving Private Ryan were previously cited as Cameron's inspirations in capturing "unsparing" wartime tragedy—advised Cameron about retelling such horrific historical events, saying that he made the two aforementioned films "as intense" as he could "because my limitation as any filmmaker... is that I can't make it as intense as it really was." Cameron specified that, unlike Oppenheimer (2023), much of his film's point of view would be from ground zero in Hiroshima and Nagasaki. Though Tsutomu Yamaguchi was a key figure in the book and was to also take center stage in the adaptation, Cameron noted that receiving his blessing to make a film of his life story was merely the first step. As previously confirmed, other "double survivors" such as Kenshi Hirata would also be included in the Ghosts of Hiroshima film, as well as the American men who were aboard the Enola Gay and Bockscar B-29 Superfortress bomber planes. When asked about bringing aboard Japanese consultants, advisors or crew, Cameron had the following to say:

Consultants and advisors? That's easy. I might want to work with a Japanese line producer. I might want to work with a Japanese screenwriter, if I can find someone as interested in this topic as I am, and who I think I can work with. Look, it's a little challenging because I’m an outsider to that culture, so that's going to be a steep learning curve for me. I've spent a lot of time in Japan, but I've experienced its culture as an outsider. So, I have to get through that, and for [our production], we must worry a little bit about this cultural appropriation concept.

Aside from what had already been discussed, the director additionally teased that the film would mainly take place from August 6 to August 9, 1945, and would not include any scenes with politicians discussing whether or not the use of nuclear weapons is justified. Cameron ended the interview by assuring that he was not the only filmmaker "allowed" to tell the story, but made it clear that no one else had tackled the subject matter on the big screen, perhaps either by choice or lack of accessibility to resources. In October, Cameron told Variety that while he intended to direct Ghosts of Hiroshima, he still hadn't by that time written a script, saying that if Avatar: Fire and Ash (2025) were a big success, he would move straight into production on Avatar 4 and Avatar 5 (2031)—though rising VFX costs and questions about profitability could also push him toward taking a break, tackling smaller projects, or slotting in Ghosts of Hiroshima before continuing the franchise. He went on to admit that he was "at a bit of a crossroads" but the only certainty was that he'd keep directing. A month later, Cameron told Matt Belloni on his podcast The Town that Ghosts of Hiroshima was one of many projects in development: "I have ten other projects; that one just sort of hit the headlines because of the book announcement and trying to push the book to a bestseller because the author is a friend of mine," he said. "Doesn't mean I'm not going to make the film, but I haven't written the script and it's not slated right now, and I don't even have a distribution partner on it. So it's pretty much a vaporware project right now."

=== Cleopatra ===
In October 2010, it was announced that Cameron was in talks to direct a new film about Cleopatra for Sony Pictures, based on Stacy Schiff's memoir Cleopatra: A Life, and with Angelina Jolie attached to the role, with a script by Brian Helgeland. Cameron eventually passed, with Denis Villeneuve being the latest director attached to the film.

=== Wicked ===
In an interview with Matthew Belloni, Cameron stated he had met with Universal Pictures around 2010 in regards to directing an adaptation of the musical of the same name. Cameron would say he ultimately decided to not do it as he "couldn't find the song".

=== Untitled Avatar prequel ===
On May 5, 2012, Cameron expressed his desire to direct a prequel to his acclaimed and successful Avatar film, with Sigourney Weaver slated to reprise her role as Dr. Grace Augustine. The film was originally supposed to be shot back-to-back with the second and third installment, as the prequel was supposed to be the fourth installment in the franchise. However, on September 8, 2012, Cameron revealed that the prequel will not be shot back-to-back with the second and the third films. Also, in April 2016, it was stated by Cameron that the fourth and fifth installments are planned to be sequels like the first two, leaving the fate of the prequel project unknown.

=== The Informationist ===
On October 23, 2012, Los Angeles Times reported that Cameron had acquired the rights to direct a film adaptation of Taylor Stevens's novel The Informationist for 20th Century Fox. Cameron's Lightstorm Entertainment was attached to develop the film. He announced that he would direct the film after finishing his work on the first two Avatar sequels. The film's release was planned to be in 2016, but no film was made, implying that the project was likely abandoned after the announcement of two more Avatar installments.

=== Alita: Battle Angel sequels ===
Since 2018, Cameron and Robert Rodriguez had hinted that Alita: Battle Angel (2019) could lead to multiple sequels. The casting of Edward Norton in a non-speaking role as Nova in the film, as well as the uncredited cameos by Michelle Rodriguez and Jai Courtney, were intended to be a setup for larger roles in a sequel. In a 2019 interview for BBC Radio 1, Cameron explained the reason for rearranging the film title from the initial source material was to allow the possibilities of sequel titles: "It's Alita, colon, Battle Angel. Because the next one will be Alita: Fallen Angel and then Alita... you know Avenging Angel and then Alita whatever. I mean, that's assuming we make some money". By 2022, Rodriguez and Cameron took a virtual blood oath to make the sequel. In April 2023, producer Jon Landau confirmed that the sequel was in active development with Rodriguez and Rosa Salazar returning as director and star, respectively. In July the same year, Cameron reiterated that he was working on more than one sequel. In 2025, Cameron stated that he and Rodriguez were co-writing the script together and were committed to making it.

== 2020s ==
=== Untitled sixth and seventh Avatar films ===
While promoting Avatar: The Way of Water (2022), on December 14, Cameron revealed that he had plans for a potential sixth and seventh film in the franchise and would make them if there was demand. However, he later noted that he would be 89 years old by the time an Avatar 6 and Avatar 7 could be released, and admitted he was "not going to be able to make Avatar movies indefinitely, [considering] the amount of energy required."

=== Untitled Terminator reboot ===
On December 19, 2022, during an appearance on the SmartLess podcast, Cameron mentioned he was "in discussion" about directing a new Terminator film, saying he would "make it much more about the AI side of it than bad robots gone crazy." By February 2023, he had begun writing a script for the Terminator reboot, announcing three months later that he wanted to see how AI developed before he went any further with it. Speaking to The Hollywood Reporter in August 2024, Cameron mentioned that he was working on his own "Terminator stuff." In August 2025, he conceded that he was struggling to come up with a story for the film, stating: "I've been unable to get started on that very far because I don't know what to say that won't be overtaken by real events. We are living in a science fiction age right now."

=== The Devils ===
In 2025, Cameron announced, via Facebook, that Lightstorm Entertainment had acquired the rights to Joe Abercrombie's bestselling novel The Devils and that he himself intended to co-write the script with Abercrombie after completion of Avatar: Fire and Ash (2025). The following month, Cameron stressed to Empire that The Devils would mark a tonal shift from his other projects, saying, "It doesn't have the kind of conscience that Avatar does, but I don't know if that's a bad thing. [Ghosts of Hiroshima] is a movie you do because you have to. The Devils is a movie you do for fun."

== Producer only ==
=== Wolverine and the X-Men ===
Around 1989, Stan Lee and Chris Claremont entered in talks with Carolco Pictures and Lightstorm Entertainment to make a film adaptation of the X-Men comic book series, with Cameron as producer, Kathryn Bigelow as director and Gary Goldman as writer. Bob Hoskins was slated to star as Wolverine and Angela Bassett was attached to star as Storm. Claremont also contacted Marvel Comics editor-in-chief Jim Shooter to revive the character of Jean Grey due to the character's demise in The Dark Phoenix Saga comic book storyline. However, the project entered into development hell when Lee piqued Cameron's interest on the long planned Spider-Man film and after the defunction of Carolco Pictures. The film was finally released in 2000 with Bryan Singer as director.

=== Brother Termite ===
In the late 1990s, Cameron, via Lightstorm Entertainment, was set to produce a film adaptation of Brother Termite, with a screenplay by John Sayles (Anthony later noted that Sayles "added a scene that [she was] particularly fond of, which did not occur in the book, but probably should have occurred in the book. It works so well.") and Steve Norrington as director; ultimately, the film was not produced, but in 2010, two minutes of test footage from Brother Termite (featuring early use of motion capture) appeared as a bonus feature on the Blu-ray release of Cameron's film Avatar.

=== The Furthest Place ===
In September 1999, it was reported that Cameron was set to produce "The Furthest Place", a script written by David Schow and Joe Gayton that would've been directed by Rupert Wainwright.

=== Dark Angel season 3 ===
On May 3, 2002, Cameron and the producers of Dark Angel were initially told a third season had been approved, but two days later Fox informed them that the series had been cancelled. Cameron said: "They called us on Saturday and told us we were on schedule and we'd been picked up. We got together Saturday night and celebrated. Sunday goes by, and Monday morning we get a call saying, 'No, you're not on the schedule! It's been changed.' I've never heard of that happening. But then, I'd never been around television. ... We were supposed to be on a plane on Monday to go to the [network] upfront in New York on Tuesday. They called us that day and told us not to go! I was pissed!" This storyline is expanded upon in the final Dark Angel novel After the Dark though when the comet returns nobody falls ill, and it is believed that the cult simply had a false prediction.

=== Terminator 3000 ===
In August 2010, Hannover House announced plans to develop a 3D animated film titled Terminator 3000, with Cameron in a producing role. Pacificor responded with a cease and desist letter, declining a $20–30 million offer from Hannover for the rights to produce the film, killing the project.

=== At the Mountains of Madness ===
On July 28, 2010, it was announced that Cameron would produce a film adaptation of H. P. Lovecraft's At the Mountains of Madness for Universal Pictures, with Mexican film director Guillermo del Toro as director. The movie was originally set up as a project at DreamWorks in 2004, but it was cancelled. Cameron suggested casting Tom Cruise in the lead role and releasing the film in 3-D.

In June 2010, del Toro said that the adaptation probably would not happen at all. He stated, "It doesn't look like I can do it. It's very difficult for the studios to take the step of doing a period-set, R-rated, tentpole movie with a tough ending and no love story. Lovecraft has a readership as big as any best-seller, but it's tough to quantify because his works are in the public domain." Cameron and Del Toro put forward the idea to Universal, who greenlit it. Earlier that same year, del Toro had also asked S. T. Joshi if he wanted to be a consultant once the movie got into production. However, due to many delays, Cameron and del Toro left the project after del Toro realized that the film would have been very similar to Ridley Scott's 2012 film Prometheus.

=== Terminator TV series ===
By December 2013, Skydance Productions and Annapurna Pictures were developing a new Terminator television series with Cameron. Ashley Miller and Zack Stentz were named as writers and executive producers. The series was said to deviate from the franchise's history at a critical moment in 1984's The Terminator, and would also integrate with then-projected film series' direct sequels to Terminator Genisys. With the rights reverting to Cameron in 2019, the planned television series connected to Terminator Genisys has since been cancelled.

== See also ==
- James Cameron filmography
