= Xenogenesis =

Xenogenesis may refer to:

- Xenogenesis (film), a 1978 short film by James Cameron
- Xenogenesis, a proposed designation for the process of introducing laboratory-designed genes
- Xenogenesis Trilogy, now published as Lilith's Brood, a collection of three novels by Octavia E. Butler
- Xenogenesis, a comic book from the Aliens comic book series by Dark Horse Comics
- Xenogenesis, a comic book from the Predator comic book series by Dark Horse Comics
- Xenogenesis, a 1990 essay by Harlan Ellison
- "Xenogenesis", a 2014 song by TheFatRat (also known as “The Outro Song”)
