= The Killing Star =

1995 novel by Charles R. Pellegrino and George Zebrowski

- Author: Charles R. Pellegrino and George Zebrowski
- Language: English
- Genre: Hard science fiction ∟ Alien invasion
- Publisher: William Morrow & Co
- Publication date: 1995
- Publication place: United States
- Media type: Print (Hardcover)
- Pages: 340
- ISBN: 0-688-13989-2
- OCLC: 31045025
- Dewey Decimal: 813/.54 20
- LC Class: PS3566.E418 K55 1995

The Killing Star is a hard science fiction novel by American writers Charles R. Pellegrino and George Zebrowski, published in April 1995. It chronicles a sudden alien invasion in a late 21st century technological utopia, while covering several other speculative fiction ideas such as sublight interstellar travel, genetic cloning, virtual reality and advanced robotics.

== Plot summary ==
In the late 21st century Earth is at peace. Humans now command self-replicating machines that create large-scale engineering marvels. Artificial habitats dot the Solar System. Anti-matter driven Valkyrie rockets carry explorers to the stars at nearly the speed of light.

Then, swarms of missiles travelling at close to the speed of light hit Earth. Though they are merely boulder-sized chunks of metal, they move fast enough to hit with the force of many nuclear arsenals. They are impossible to track and to stop. Humanity is almost wiped out by the bombardment.

A handful of survivors desperately struggle to escape the alien mop-up fleet. They hide close to the Sun, inside asteroids, beneath the crusts of moons, within ice rings, and in interstellar space. Most are however hunted down and slaughtered.

The last man and woman on Earth are captured as zoo specimens. In the belly of an alien starship, a squid-like being relates to them the pitiless logic behind humankind's execution: the moment humans learned to travel at relativistic speeds was the moment mankind simply became too dangerous a neighbor to have around. The final revelation is that the alien is itself subservient to a powerful artificial intelligence.

== Plot threads ==
The following is an overview of the various survival stories listed according to their location.

Sun
A single spacecraft (a converted comet) grazes the Sun while playing a game of cat and mouse with an intruder starship. The humans use bombs which convert mass into energy to cause a massive solar eruption which destroys the alien pursuers. Several years later, at the book's end, this band makes the Sun go supernova, thus cleansing the Solar System of the intruders.
Earth
The last people alive on Earth are a man and woman in a submersible. The relativistic missiles hit while they are surveying RMS Titanic. One of the characters finds respite in a virtual reality program of the Titanic. Eventually, the couple goes ashore at New York City where the only evidence they find that humankind ever existed is the plumbing for a swimming pool buried deep beneath the mud. The pair regularly send out distress calls which the aliens home in on. The two survivors are captured as zoo specimens.
Ceres
Colonists living within the dwarf planet Ceres escape the initial attack unnoticed. Unfortunately, the waste heat from normal colony operations, plus the colony's cavern excavations, have produced an unmistakable corona of dust and infrared emissions. The colonists know they will likely draw the aliens' attention sooner or later, but have no choice but to try to hide. They drop power usage to near zero and cut all radio transmissions. The aliens, however, broadcast a virus program which one of the Ceres robots picks up. The virus tells the robot to make self-replicating nanomachines. These "grey goo" nanobots (the book describes them as self-replicating molecules that raise the melting point of ceramic and metal compounds) disassemble the Ceres habitat, killing all the colonists.
Saturn
Clones of what some believe to be the historical Jesus and Buddha lead their flock away from Saturn's rings. The group plans to hide around the energy rich brown dwarfs in the interstellar medium. There they hope to rebuild human civilization and eventually strike back at the alien murderers.
Neptune
Some humans hiding below the frozen crust of Neptune's moon, Triton take their ship to Neptune to see about establishing a deep ocean base. The captain, however, has a mental breakdown and drives his vessel down until it implodes.
Deep space
Several interplanetary vessels and a few Valkyries returning from interstellar missions are destroyed early on. Several Valkyries are shot down by colonies in the asteroid belt (including Ceres) to prevent them from accidentally betraying the location of the remaining pockets of humanity. There is some speculation that a handful of husband–wife teams in Valkyrie ships in nearby starsystems may still survive.

== Contemporary and historical references ==
The Killing Star makes several references to historic and contemporary people, places, and things. These include:

- Six alien ships patrolling through the post-attack Solar System continually broadcast the song "We Are the World" by Michael Jackson and Lionel Richie. It served both as a taunt to the pathetic survivors and as a carrier for computer viruses. The aliens chose this song partly because on April 5, 1985, it constituted the single strongest radio transmission ever sent from Earth. It also conveyed the disturbing impression that humanity might become a unified force to reckon with.
- The aliens presented to two of the human survivors footage from several Star Trek: The Next Generation episodes as examples of a deep-rooted desire to dominate all other species.
- One of the survivors on Earth spent an inordinate amount of time in a virtual reality simulation of the Titanic. He tinkered with the program until, without knowing it, he made it sentient. Since the artificial intelligence was a representation of his mother, the AI convinced him to delete her so that he could get back to the business of living.

== General and cited references ==
- Berry, Adrian. "The younger you are, the safer". Spectator 278.8797 (08 Mar. 1997): 17.
- Feeley, Gregory. "Science fiction and fantasy." Washington Post News Feed 118.202 (25 June 1995): 8
- Green, Roland. "Adult books: Fiction." Booklist 91.16 (15 Apr. 1995): 1484.
- Jonas, Gerald. "Science Fiction." New York Times Book Review (14 May 1995): 24.
- Naeye, Robert. "The Killing Star Scenario". Mercury 32.6 (Nov. 2003): 24-24.
