= Charles R. Pellegrino =

American author (born 1953)

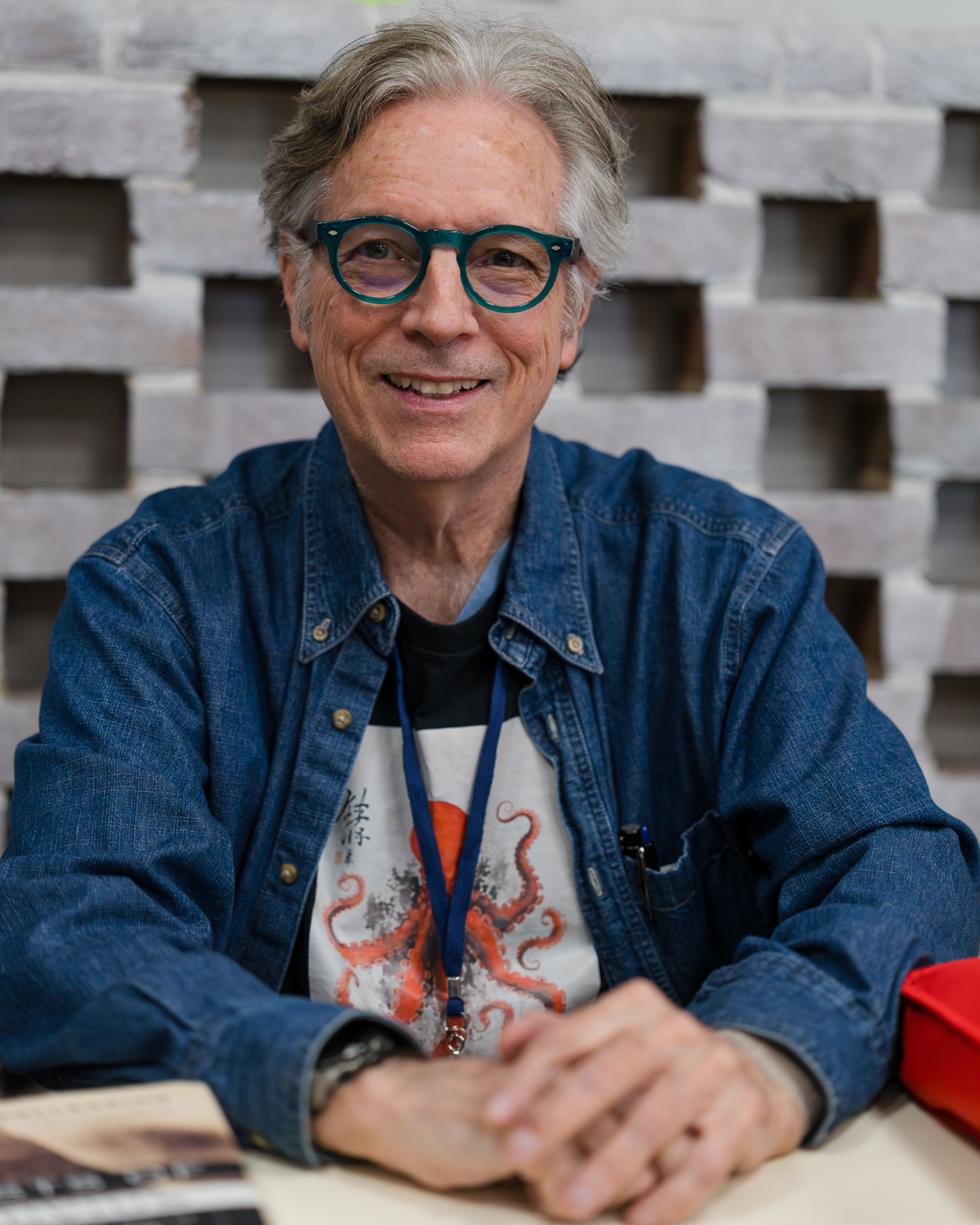
- Pellegrino in 2026
- Born: May 5, 1953 (age 73)
- Education: Long Island University (BS, MS)
- Occupation: Author
- Website: charlespellegrino.com

Charles R. Pellegrino (born May 5, 1953) is an American writer and the author of several books related to science and archaeology including Her Name, Titanic (1988); Ghosts of the Titanic (2000); and To Hell and Back: The Last Train from Hiroshima (2015).

== Biography ==
Pellegrino was born on May 5, 1953, to John and Jane Pellegrino. He grew up in Queens and Rockville Centre, New York. At age 15, Pellegrino was diagnosed with cancer and a rare genetic disease, Ankylosing spondylitis.

Pellegrino claimed to have received a PhD in 1982 from Victoria University of Wellington in New Zealand. The university investigated his claim and said that it had never awarded him a PhD; the university's vice chancellor said that Pellegrino's thesis was not approved and that the Governor-General denied his appeal.

In 2010, Henry Holt and Company withdrew The Last Train from Hiroshima from publication because one of Pellegrino's sources admitted to lying. A revised edition, To Hell and Back: The Last Train From Hiroshima, was released on August 6, 2015. It was published by Rowman & Littlefield.

Pellegrino participated in a study to use magnetic resonance imaging (MRI) to image the inside of 70-million-year-old dinosaur eggs. He was also a technical advisor to director James Cameron on the films Titanic and Avatar.

== Bibliography ==
=== Nonfiction ===
- Time Gate: Hurtling Backward Through History (1983)
- Darwin's Universe: Origins and Crises in the History of Life (with Jesse A. Stoff, 1983)
- Chariots for Apollo: The Untold Story Behind the Race to the Moon (with Joshua Stoff, 1985)
- Interstellar Travel and Communication (with James Powell, Isaac Asimov, et al., 1986)
- Chronic Fatigue Syndrome: The Hidden Epidemic (with Jesse A. Stoff, 1988)
- Her Name, Titanic: Untold Story of the Sinking and Finding of the Unsinkable Ship (1988)
- Unearthing Atlantis: An Archaeological Odyssey (1991)
- Return to Sodom and Gomorrah: Bible Stories from Archaeologists (1994)
- Ghosts of the Titanic (2000)
- Ghosts of Vesuvius: A New Look at the Last Days of Pompeii, How Towers Fall, and Other Strange Connections (2004)
- The Jesus Family Tomb: The Discovery, the Investigation, and the Evidence That Could Change History (with Simcha Jacobovici, 2007)
- The Last Train from Hiroshima Henry Holt, (2010)
- Farewell, Titanic: Her Final Legacy, John Wiley & Sons, N.J. (2012).
- The Californian Incident, Shoebox/Kindle, Canada (2013).
- StarTram: The New Race for Space. (with James Powell, George Maise) Shoebox/Kindle, Canada (2013).
- To Hell and Back: The Last Train from Hiroshima (2015)
- Ghosts of Hiroshima (2025)

=== Fiction ===
- Flying to Valhalla (1993)
- The Killing Star (with George Zebrowski, 1995)
- Dust (1998)
- Dyson Sphere (with George Zebrowski, 1999)

== Filmography ==
- Lost Civilizations: Aegean – Legacy of Atlantis – Time-Life / NBC (1995).

Re-released on October 1, 2002, as part of a 4-DVD set entitled Time Life's Lost Civilizations

- Ghosts of the Abyss with James Cameron (2003)
- Naked Science: Atlantis – National Geographic Channel (2004)
- Aliens of the Deep with James Cameron (2005)
- The Naked Archaeologist: Joshua – History Channel. Hosted by Simcha Jacobovici (2006)
- American Vesuvius – History Channel (2006)
- Secrets of the Bible – National Geographic Channel (2006)
- The Exodus Decoded – History Channel. With Simcha Jacobovici and James Cameron (2006)
- The Lost Tomb of Jesus – Discovery Channel. With Simcha Jacobovici (2007)
- Three Ground Zeros, a Thousand Paper Cranes (2008)
- The Last Train from Hiroshima (Japan TV, 2009)
- Pellegrino and the Hiroshima Controversy in America (Japan TV, Hidetaka/Nakamura, 2010)
- The Legacy of Tsutomu Yamaguchi (Japan TV, Hidetaka/Nakamura, 2011)
- Twice Bombed, Twice Survived, Part 2 (Japan TV, Hidetaka/Nakamura, 2012)
