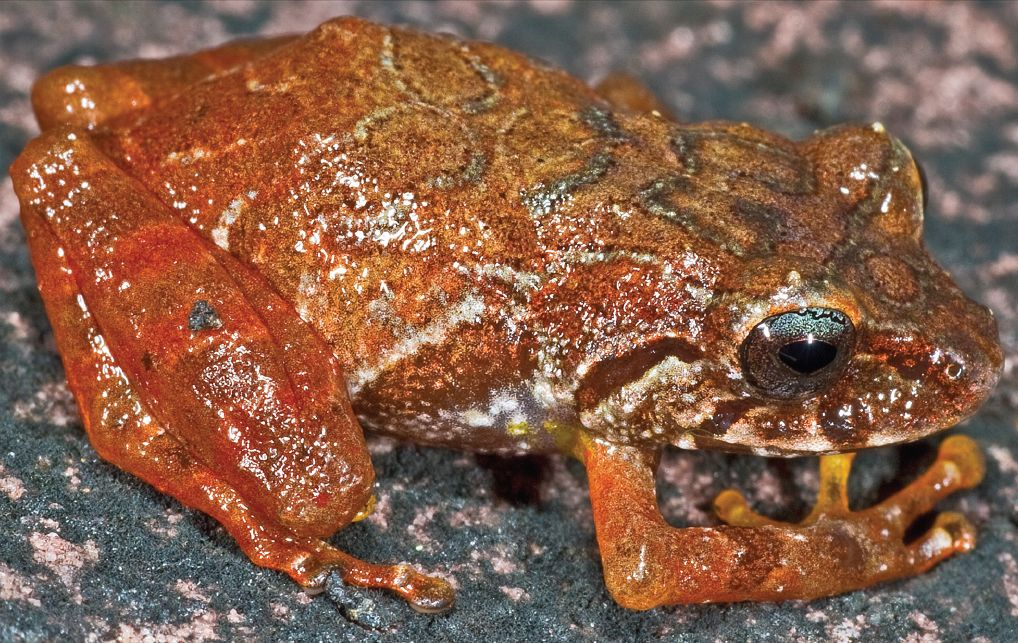
- Juvenile

Scientific classification
- Kingdom: Animalia
- Phylum: Chordata
- Class: Amphibia
- Order: Anura
- Clade: Brachycephaloidea
- Family: Craugastoridae
- Genus: Pristimantis
- Species: P. jamescameroni

Binomial name
- Pristimantis jamescameroni Kok, 2013

= Pristimantis jamescameroni =

Small frog from Venezuela named after James Cameron

Pristimantis jamescameroni is a species of frog belonging to the family Strabomantidae. It is an orange-brown coloured small frog reported so far only from the Aprada-tepui, a table-top mountain in Bolívar state, Venezuela. It was discovered in June 2012 and formally described in October 2013 by Belgian biologist Philippe J. R. Kok at the Royal Belgian Institute of Natural Sciences and Vrije Universiteit Brussel. The species was named after the Hollywood filmmaker James Cameron, in recognition of his efforts in environmental awareness, and in addition to his public promotion of veganism as a way of animal conservation. Due to its restricted occurrence, the species could be classified as "endangered" according to the criteria of the IUCN Red List of Threatened Species.

== Discovery and etymology ==
An adult male (holotype) and three female (paratypes) Pristimantis jamescameroni were collected by Philippe Kok on the morning of 15 June 2012 at the summit of Aprada-tepui. The Pantepui region is situated in the northwestern part of the Guiana Shield, and is recognized as one of the primary centres of speciation and occurrence of endemic species in the Neotropics, especially of birds, amphibians and reptiles. The region is already known as the major site of habitat of at least twenty Pristimantis species, including recently discovered species such as P. aureoventris, P. muchimuk, P. abakapa, P. auricarens, P. pulvinatus, P. stegolepis and P. tepuiensis. The specific epithet is a genitive case of the multiple Academy Award-winning film director and producer, James Cameron, which is contracted into a single word. Cameron was chosen because of his "efforts to alert the general public of the environmental problems through pioneering high quality blockbuster movies and adventurous documentaries". Further Cameron was recognized for his "encouragement of people to go vegan", "one of the effective ways to reduce human environmental impacts such as global climate change, identified as a serious threat to tepuis ecosystems".

== Description ==
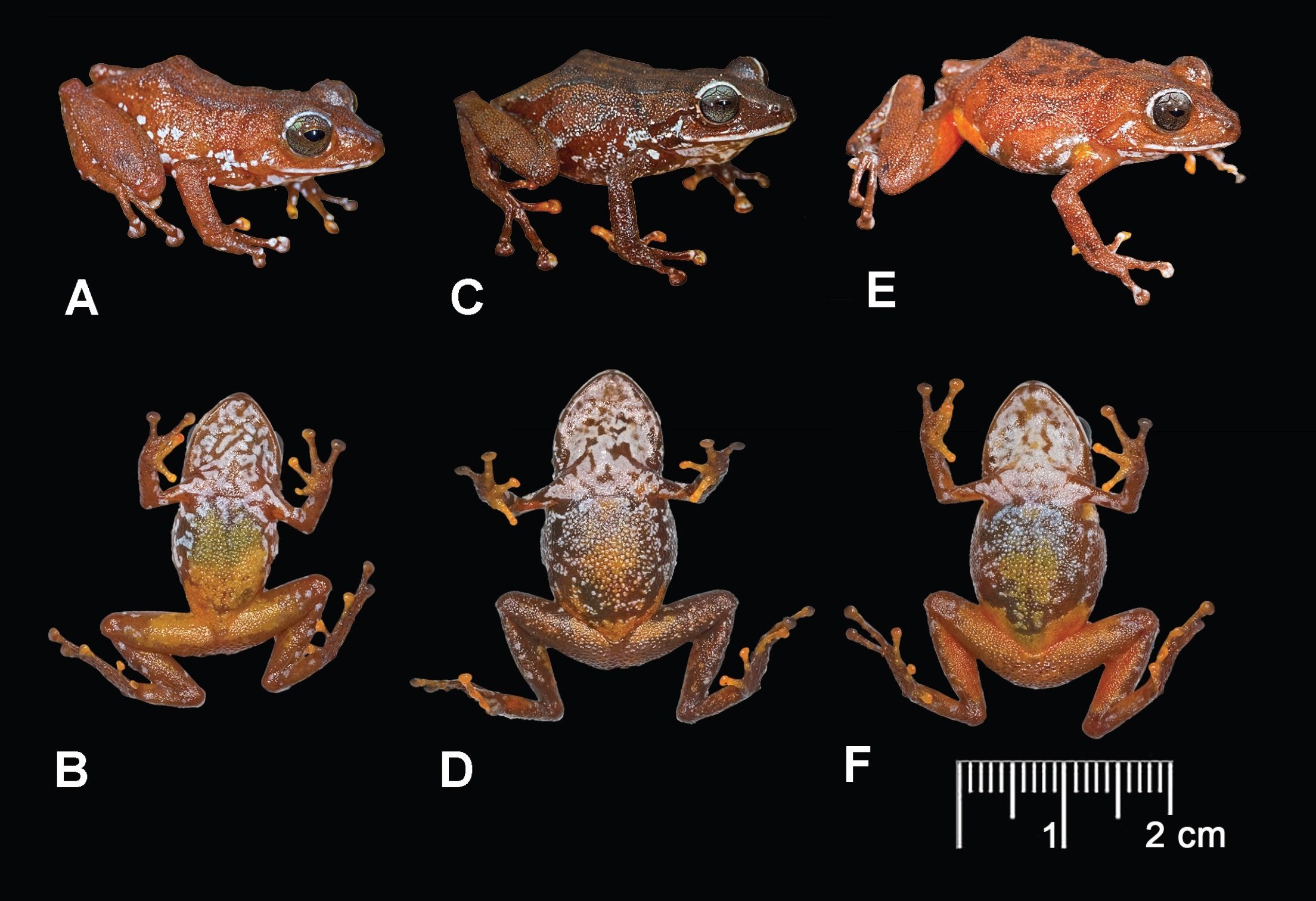
Male (left) and two females, showing variation in dorsal and ventral coloration

Pristimantis jamescameroni is a tiny frog, and mostly brown with orange stripes in colour. Sexual dimorphism is characterized by larger female (2.6–2.7 cm or 1.0–1.1 in snout–vent length) against the smaller male (2.3 cm or 0.9 in snout–vent length). Further nuptial pads are present only in males, and the hands and feet are slightly longer than those of female. The dorsal surface is mixed with numerous white flecks. The arms and legs are similarly coloured, with less of orange, and with few small irregular white spots on upper arms. The ventral side of the body is lighter in colour and mostly covered by orange colour. The tips of the toes are whitish. The head is slightly longer than broad, and is wider than the main body. The nares are slightly projecting towards the side of the body. The widest upper eyelid is narrower than interorbital distance. The upper eyelid is shagreen with 1–2 enlarged tubercles on each eyelid. The colour of iris varies from silver or greenish silver to bronze, with dark-brown venation, is ill-defined, and with broad horizontal brownish stripe. Tympanum is absent. Supratympanic fold is extremely large and is slightly arched, originating at posterior corner of eye. There are minute pharyngeal ostia. The tongue is cordiform, slightly longer than wide, and rounded posteriorly. The posterior half of the tongue is free. Vocal slits and vocal sac are absent, in contrast to closely related species. There are two large, not connected, non-spinous, mostly unpigmented nuptial pads on each thumb of the arms in male. One nuptial pad is extending along the preaxial surface of the tubercle and invading most of it, while the other extends along the dorsal and the preaxial surface of the thumb. Finger discs are broadly expanded, elliptical in shape, and broader than long. The circumferential groove on the discs are conspicuous, and the terminal edge is rounded. Legs are moderate in length, and the heels are slightly overlapping. Toe discs are mostly similar in size and shape to the finger discs.

== Ecology ==
Pristimantis jamescameroni is so far known only from the summit of Aprada-tepui at Bolívar state, Venezuela, where it is found at an elevation range between 2,557 and 2,571 m (8,389 and 8,435 ft) above sea level. The habitat is mainly covered by open rock vegetation and small islands of tepui forests. The region is particularly characterized by numerous small lakes and some deep canyons. The main habitat area is apparently the underneath of shallow rocks. The holotype was collected during day on the ground while calling in a small shallow rock crevice, hidden by the vegetation. All other specimens were collected under rocks. Other males could be heard calling very sporadically from shallow rock crevices by day. Due to their limited distribution, Kok suggested the frogs be classified as Endangered by the IUCN Red List of Threatened Species.

== See also ==
- List of organisms named after famous people (born 1950–1974)
