= James Cameron =

Canadian filmmaker and explorer (born 1954)

James Cameron CC
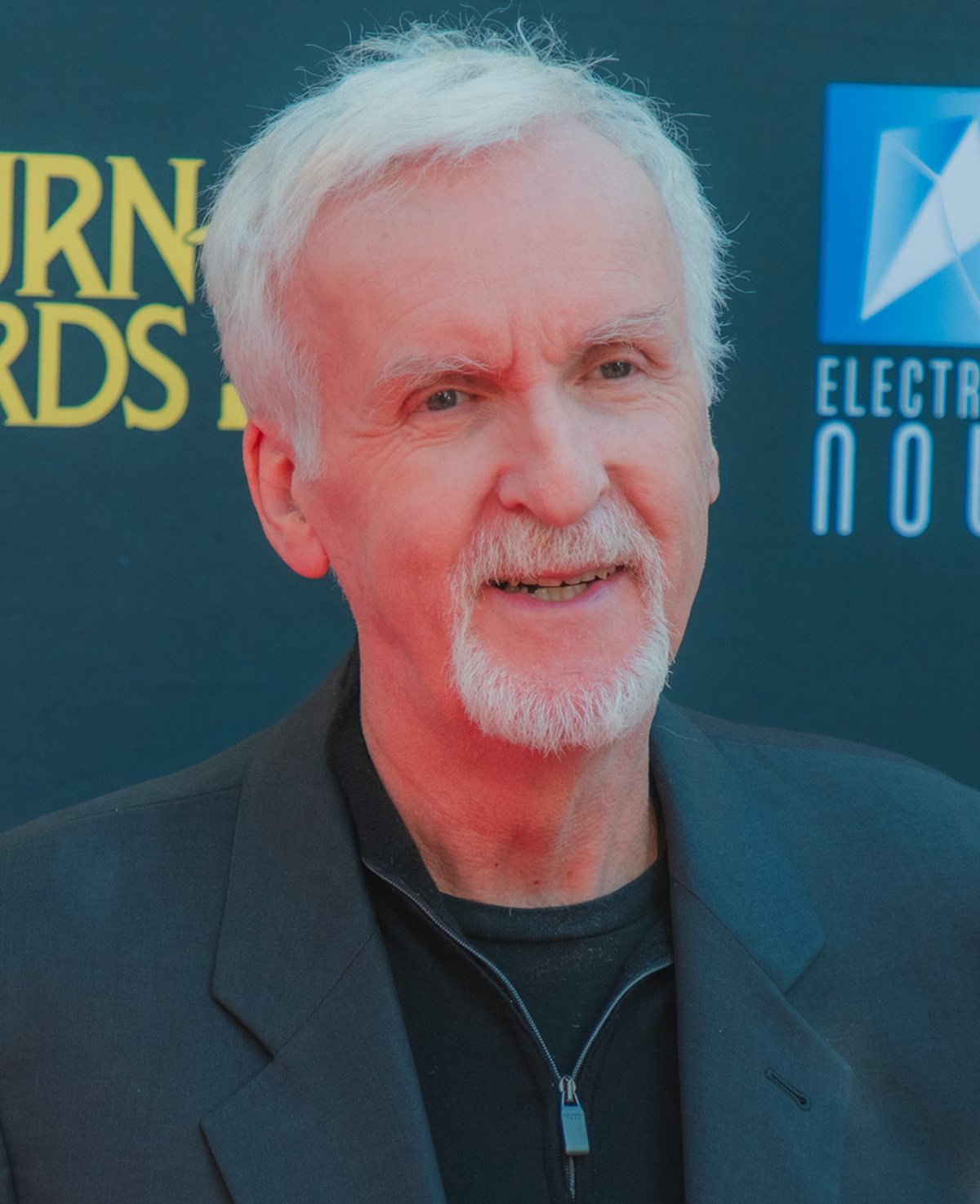
- Cameron in 2026
- Born: James Francis Cameron; August 16, 1954 (age 72); Kapuskasing, Ontario, Canada
- Citizenship: Canada (by birth); New Zealand (acquired, since 2025)
- Occupations: Film director; producer; screenwriter; editor; entrepreneur; philanthropist; explorer
- Years active: 1978–present
- Organizations: Lightstorm Entertainment; Digital Domain; Earthship Productions
- Works: Filmography; unrealized projects
- Spouses: Sharon Williams (m. 1978; div. 1984) Gale Anne Hurd (m. 1985; div. 1989) Kathryn Bigelow (m. 1989; div. 1991) Linda Hamilton (m. 1997; div. 1999) Suzy Amis (m. 2000)
- Children: 5
- Awards: Full list

James Francis Cameron (born August 16, 1954) is a Canadian filmmaker and explorer. His films combine cutting-edge film technology with classical filmmaking techniques and have grossed over $10 billion worldwide, making him the second-highest-grossing film director of all time. A major figure in the post-New Hollywood era, Cameron has received numerous accolades including three Academy Awards, two Primetime Emmy Awards, and four Golden Globe Awards, as well as nominations for six British Academy Film Awards.

Born and raised in Ontario, Canada, Cameron moved to California, United States aged 17 and enrolled at Fullerton Community College. Beginning his career with the short film Xenogenesis (1978), he first gained recognition for writing and directing the science fiction action film The Terminator (1984). He had further success with Aliens (1986), The Abyss (1989), Terminator 2: Judgment Day (1991), and True Lies (1994), as well as the Avatar franchise (2009–present). He directed, wrote, co-produced, and co-edited the historical romance epic Titanic (1997), winning Academy Awards for Best Picture, Best Director, and Best Film Editing.

Three of Cameron's films (Note: These films are Avatar (2009), Avatar: The Way of Water (2022) and Titanic (1997).) are amongst the top five highest-grossing films of all time. He directed the first film to gross over $1 billion, the first two films to gross over $2 billion each and the third coming in at 1.5 billion, and is the only director to have had three films gross over $2 billion each, as well as the first director to have four consecutive feature films gross over $1 billion each. Additionally, three of his films (Note: These films are The Terminator (1984), Terminator 2: Judgment Day (1991), and Titanic (1997).) have been selected for preservation in the National Film Registry by the Library of Congress. Cameron also co-founded the production companies Lightstorm Entertainment, Digital Domain, and Earthship Productions. In 2010, Time named Cameron one of the 100 most influential people in the world.

In addition to filmmaking, Cameron is a National Geographic explorer-in-residence and has produced many documentaries on deep-ocean exploration, including Ghosts of the Abyss (2003) and Aliens of the Deep (2005). Cameron has also contributed to underwater filming and remote vehicle technologies, and helped create the new digital 3D Fusion Camera System. In 2012, he became the first person to complete a solo descent to the bottom of the Mariana Trench, the deepest part of Earth's ocean, in the Deepsea Challenger submersible. He is also an environmentalist and runs several sustainability businesses.

== Early life and education ==
James Francis Cameron was born on August 16, 1954, in Kapuskasing, Ontario, to Philip Cameron, an electrical engineer, and Shirley (née Lowe), an artist and nurse. He is the first of five children, with two brothers and two sisters. His paternal great-great-great-grandfather emigrated from Balquhidder, Scotland, in 1825. Cameron spent summers on his grandfather's farm in Southern Ontario. He attended Stamford Collegiate in Niagara Falls, Ontario. At age 17, Cameron and his family moved from Chippawa, Ontario, to Brea, California. He attended Sonora High School and then moved to Brea Olinda High School. Classmates recalled that he was not a sportsman but instead enjoyed building things that "either went up into the air or into the deep".

After high school, Cameron enrolled at Fullerton College, a community college, in 1973 to study physics. He switched subjects to English, but left the college at the end of 1974. Cameron worked odd jobs, including as a truck driver and a high school janitor. He drank beer, frequently consumed cannabis and LSD, and wrote in his free time. During this period, he learned about special effects by reading other students' work on "optical printing, or front screen projection, or dye transfers, anything that related to film technology" at the University of Southern California library. After the excitement of seeing Star Wars in 1977, Cameron quit his job as a truck driver to enter the film industry.

== Career ==
=== 1978–1989: Early career and breakthrough ===
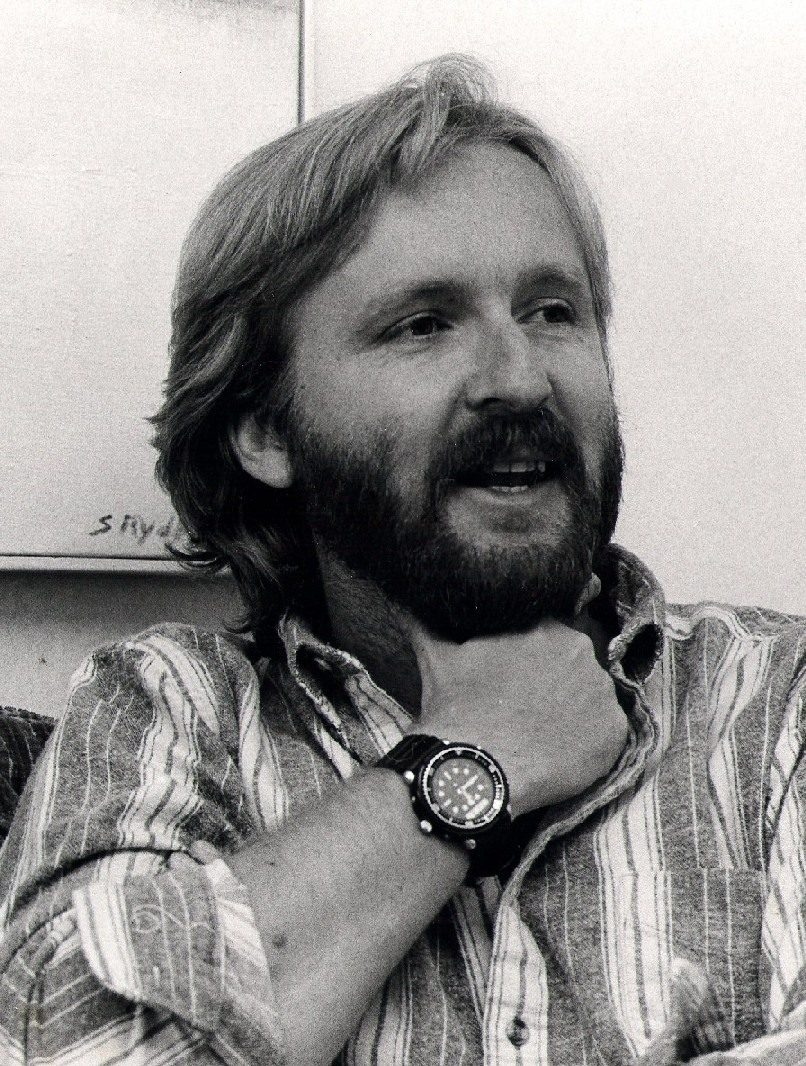
Cameron, September 1986

Cameron's directing career began in 1978. After borrowing money from a consortium of dentists, he learned to direct, write and produce his first short film, Xenogenesis (1978), with his friend Randall Frakes. Learning as he went, Cameron said he felt like a doctor doing his first surgical procedure. He then served as a production assistant for Rock 'n' Roll High School (1979). While educating himself about filmmaking techniques, Cameron started a job as a miniature model maker at Roger Corman Studios. He was soon employed as an art director for the science-fiction film Battle Beyond the Stars (1980). He carried out the special effects for John Carpenter's Escape from New York (1981), served as production designer for Galaxy of Terror (1981), and consulted on the design for Android (1982).

Cameron was hired as the visual effects director for the sequel to Piranha (1978), titled Piranha II: The Spawning in 1982. The original director, Miller Drake, left the project due to creative differences with producer Ovidio Assonitis. Shot in Rome, Italy, and on Grand Cayman Island, the film gave Cameron the opportunity to become director for a major film for the first time. Cameron later said that it did not feel like his first film due to power-struggles with Assonitis. Upon release of Piranha II: The Spawning, critics were not impressed; author Tim Healey called it "a marvellously bad movie which splices clichés from every conceivable source".

In 1982, inspired by John Carpenter's horror film Halloween (1978), as well as a nightmare about an invincible robot hit-man sent from the future to assassinate him, Cameron wrote the script for The Terminator (1984), a sci-fi action film about a cyborg sent from the future to carry out a lethal mission. Cameron wanted to sell the script so that he could direct the film. While some film studios expressed interest in the project, many executives were unwilling to let a new and unfamiliar director make the film. Gale Anne Hurd, a colleague and founder of Pacific Western Productions, agreed to buy Cameron's script for one dollar, on the condition that Cameron direct the film. He convinced the president of Hemdale Pictures to make the film, with Cameron as director and Hurd as a producer. Lance Henriksen, who starred in Piranha II: The Spawning, was considered for the lead role, but Cameron decided that Arnold Schwarzenegger was more suitable as the cyborg villain due to his bodybuilder appearance. Henriksen was given a smaller role instead. Michael Biehn and Linda Hamilton also joined the cast. The Terminator was a box office success, exceeding expectations set by Orion Pictures, and earning over $78 million worldwide. George Perry of the BBC praised Cameron's direction, writing: "Cameron laces the action with ironic jokes, but never lets up on hinting that the terror may strike at any moment". In 2008, the film was selected for preservation in the United States National Film Registry, being deemed "culturally, historically, or aesthetically significant".

In 1984, Cameron was hired to write a sequel to First Blood; it was rewritten by Sylvester Stallone and released as Rambo: First Blood Part II. Cameron was then hired to write and direct a sequel to Alien (1979), a science fiction horror film directed by Ridley Scott. Like the original, the sequel Aliens (1986) featured Sigourney Weaver as Ellen Ripley. Aliens follows Ripley as she helps a group of marines fight off extraterrestrials. Despite conflicts with cast and crew during production, and having to replace one of the lead actors—James Remar with Michael Biehn—Aliens was a box office success, generating over $130 million worldwide. The film was nominated for seven Academy Awards in 1987; Best Actress, Best Art Direction, Best Film Editing, Best Original Score and Best Sound. It won awards for Best Sound Editing and Best Visual Effects. In addition, Weaver and the film made the cover of Time in July 1986.

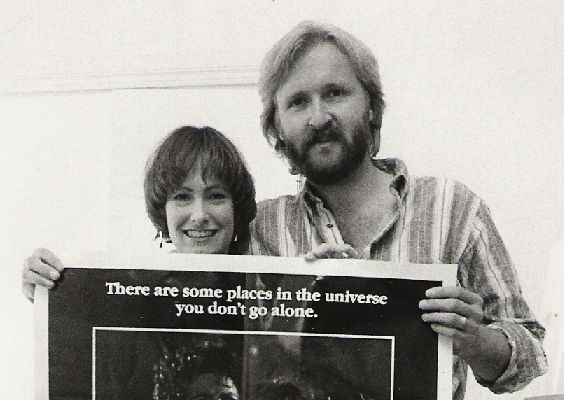
Cameron with Gale Anne Hurd, 1986

After Aliens, Cameron and Gale Anne Hurd decided to make The Abyss, a story about oil-rig workers who discover strange intelligent life in the ocean. Based on an idea which Cameron had conceived of during high school, the film was initially budgeted at $41 million, although it ran considerably over this amount. It starred Ed Harris, Mary Elizabeth Mastrantonio and Michael Biehn. The production process began in the Cayman Islands and in South Carolina, in two huge water tanks "reclaimed from" an unfinished nuclear power plant. The cast and crew recall Cameron's dictatorial behavior, and the filming of water scenes which were mentally and physically exhausting. Upon the film's release, The Abyss was praised for its special effects, and earned $90 million at the worldwide box office. The Abyss received four Academy Award nominations, and won Best Visual Effects.

=== 1990–1999: Stardom and acclaim ===
In 1990, Cameron co-founded the firm Lightstorm Entertainment with collaborator Lawrence Kasanoff. In 1991, Cameron served as executive producer for Point Break (1991), directed by Kathryn Bigelow. After the success of The Terminator, there were discussions for a sequel, and by the late 1980s, Mario Kassar of Carolco Pictures secured the rights to the sequel, allowing Cameron to begin production of the film, Terminator 2: Judgment Day (1991). Written by Cameron and William Wisher Jr., Schwarzenegger and Linda Hamilton reprise their roles. The story follows on from Terminator, depicting a new villain (T-1000), with shape-shifting abilities who hunts for Sarah Connor's son, John (Edward Furlong). Cameron cast Robert Patrick as T-1000 because of his lean and thin appearance—a sharp contrast to Schwarzenegger. Cameron explained: "I wanted someone who was extremely fast and agile. If the T-800 is a human Panzer tank, then the T-1000 is a Porsche". Terminator 2 was one of the most expensive films to be produced, costing at least $94 million ($222 million in 2025). Despite the challenging use of computer-generated imagery (CGI), the film was completed on time and released on July 3, 1991. Terminator 2 broke box office records (including the opening weekend record for an R-rated film), earning over $200 million in North America and being the first to earn over $300 million worldwide (respectively over $473 million and $709 million in 2025). It won four Academy Awards: Best Makeup, Best Sound Mixing, Best Sound Editing and Best Visual Effects. It also received nominations for Best Cinematography and Best Film Editing.

In subsequent years, Cameron planned to do a third Terminator film, but plans never materialized. The rights to the Terminator franchise were eventually purchased by Kassar from a bankruptcy sale of Carolco's assets. Cameron moved on to other projects and, in 1993, co-founded Digital Domain, a visual effects production company. In 1994, Cameron and Schwarzenegger reunited for their third collaboration, True Lies, a remake of the 1991 French comedy La Totale!. The story depicts an American secret agent who leads a double life as a married man, whose wife believes he is a computer salesman. The film co-stars Jamie Lee Curtis, Eliza Dushku and Tom Arnold. Cameron's Lightstorm Entertainment signed a deal with 20th Century Fox for the production of True Lies. Budgeted at a minimum of $100 million, the film earned $146 million in the United States and Canada. The film was nominated for an Academy Award for Best Visual Effects and Curtis won a Golden Globe Award for Best Actress. It was during the production of True Lies that he would first meet Jon Landau, who at the time oversaw the film's production for Fox. In July 2024, Cameron stated that he "lured" Landau away from Fox to Lightstorm.

In 1995, Cameron co-produced Strange Days, a science fiction thriller. Directed by Kathryn Bigelow and co-written by Jay Cocks, Strange Days was critically and financially unsuccessful. In 1996, Cameron reunited with the cast of Terminator 2 to film T2 3-D: Battle Across Time, an attraction at Universal Studios Florida, and in other parks around the world.

His next major project was Titanic (1997), an epic about the RMS Titanic, which sank in 1912 after hitting an iceberg. With a production budget of $200 million, at the time it was the most expensive film ever made. Starting in 1995, Cameron took several dives to the bottom of the Atlantic Ocean to capture footage of the wreck, which would later be used in the film. A replica of the ship was built in Rosarito Beach and principal photography began in September 1996. Titanic made headlines before its release, for being over-budget and exceeding its schedule. In a radical departure from Cameron's previous work, his completed screenplay depicts two star-crossed lovers, portrayed by Leonardo DiCaprio and Kate Winslet, from different social classes who fall in love amid the backdrop of the ship's tragedy. The supporting cast includes Billy Zane, Kathy Bates, Frances Fisher, Gloria Stuart, Bernard Hill, Jonathan Hyde, Victor Garber, Danny Nucci, David Warner and Bill Paxton. The film was also Cameron's first large-scale production with Landau as a co-producer.

After months of delay, Titanic premiered on December 19, 1997. The film received widespread critical acclaim and became the highest-grossing film of all time, holding this position for twelve years, until Cameron's Avatar beat the record in 2010. The costumes and sets were praised, and The Washington Post considered the CGI graphics to be spectacular. Titanic received a record-tying fourteen nominations (tied with All About Eve in 1950) at the 1998 Academy Awards. It won eleven of the awards, tying the record for most wins with 1959's Ben-Hur (now also tied with 2003's The Lord of the Rings: The Return of the King) including: Best Picture, Best Director, Best Art Direction, Best Cinematography, Best Visual Effects, Best Film Editing, Best Costume Design, Best Sound Mixing, Best Sound Editing, Best Original Score and Best Original Song. Upon receiving Best Picture, Cameron and producer Jon Landau asked for a moment of silence to remember the 1,500 people who died when the ship sank. Film critic Roger Ebert praised Cameron's storytelling, writing: "It is flawlessly crafted, intelligently constructed, strongly acted, and spellbinding". Authors Kevin Sandler and Gaylyn Studlar wrote in 1999 that the romance, historical nostalgia and James Horner's music contributed to the film's cultural phenomenon. In 2017, on its 20th anniversary, Titanic became Cameron's second film to be selected for preservation in the United States National Film Registry.

After the huge success of Titanic, Cameron kept a low profile. In 1998, he and his brother, John, formed Earthship Productions, to stream documentaries about the deep sea, one of Cameron's interests. Again during 1998, Cameron considered doing a large-scale technological/religious film by an unknown writer, but after three tries was forced to personally pass on the project "due to his secular nature." Cameron had also planned to make a film about Spider-Man, a project developed by Menahem Golan of Cannon Films. Columbia hired David Koepp to adapt Cameron's ideas into a screenplay, but due to various disagreements, Cameron abandoned the project. In 2002, Spider-Man was released, with the screenplay credited solely to Koepp.

=== 2000–2009: Established career ===
In 2000, Cameron made his debut in television and, with Charles H. Eglee, co-created Dark Angel, a television series influenced by cyberpunk, biopunk, contemporary superheroes and third-wave feminism. Dark Angel starred Jessica Alba as Max Guevara, a genetically enhanced super-soldier created by a secretive organization. While the first season was moderately successful, the second season did less well, which led to its cancellation.

In 2002, Cameron served as producer on the 2002 film Solaris, a science fiction drama directed by Steven Soderbergh. The film gained mixed reviews and failed at the box office. Keen to make documentaries, Cameron directed Expedition: Bismarck, about the German Battleship Bismarck. In 2003, he directed Ghosts of the Abyss, a documentary about RMS Titanic which was released by Walt Disney Pictures and Walden Media, and designed for 3D theaters. Cameron told The Guardian his intention for filming everything in 3D. In 2005, Cameron co-directed Aliens of the Deep, a documentary about the various forms of life in the ocean. He also starred in Titanic Adventure with Tony Robinson, another documentary about the Titanic shipwreck. In 2006, Cameron co-created and narrated The Exodus Decoded, a documentary exploring the Biblical account of the Exodus. In 2007, Cameron and fellow director Simcha Jacobovici, produced The Lost Tomb of Jesus. It was broadcast on Discovery Channel on March 4, 2007; the documentary was controversial for arguing that the Talpiot Tomb was the burial place of Jesus of Nazareth.

By the mid-2000s, Cameron returned to directing and producing his first mainstream film since Titanic. Cameron had displayed interest in making Avatar (2009) and Alita: Battle Angel (2019) as early as June 2005, with both films to be shot using 3D technology. He wanted to make Alita: Battle Angel first, followed by Avatar, but switched the order in February 2006. Although Cameron had written an 80-page treatment for Avatar in 1995, Cameron stated that he wanted the necessary technology to improve before starting production. Avatar, with the story line set in the mid-22nd century, had an estimated budget in excess of $300 million. The cast includes Sam Worthington, Zoe Saldaña, Stephen Lang, Michelle Rodriguez and Sigourney Weaver. It was composed with a mix of live-action footage and computer-generated animation, using an advanced version of the motion capture technique, previously used by director Robert Zemeckis in The Polar Express. Cameron intended Avatar to be 3D-only but decided to adapt it for conventional viewing as well.

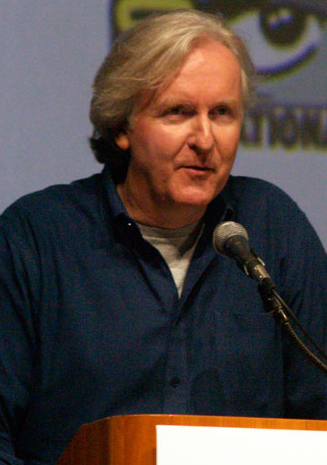
Cameron promoting Avatar at San Diego Comic-Con, 2009

Intended for release in May 2009, Avatar premiered on December 18, 2009. This delay allowed more time for post-production and the opportunity for theaters to install 3D projectors. Avatar broke several box office records during its initial theatrical run. It grossed $749.7 million in the United States and Canada and more than $2.74 billion worldwide, becoming the highest-grossing film of all time in the United States and Canada, surpassing Titanic. It was the first film to earn more than $2 billion worldwide. Avatar was nominated for nine Academy Awards, including Best Picture and Best Director, and won three: Best Art Direction, Best Cinematography and Best Visual Effects. In July 2010, an extended theatrical re-release generated an additional $33.2 million worldwide (equivalent to $47,780,000 in 2025) at the box office. In his mixed review, Sukhdev Sandhu of The Telegraph complimented the 3D, but opined that Cameron "should have been more brutal in his editing". That year, Vanity Fair reported that Cameron's earnings were US$257 million, making him the highest earner in Hollywood. As of 2022, Avatar and Titanic hold the achievement for being the first two of the six films in history to gross over $2 billion worldwide. As with Titanic, Landau would greatly assist Cameron as the co-producer of the Avatar films as well.

=== 2010–present: Further work and prospective projects ===
In June 2010, Cameron met with officials of the Environmental Protection Agency to discuss possible solutions to the Deepwater Horizon oil spill. It was reported that he offered his assistance to help stop the oil well from leaking. He is a member of the NASA Advisory Council and he worked with the space agency to build cameras for the Curiosity rover sent for Mars. NASA launched the rover without Cameron's technology due to a lack of time during testing. He has expressed interest in a project about Mars, stating: "I've been very interested in the Humans to Mars movement ... and I've done a tremendous amount of personal research for a novel, a miniseries, and a 3D film." Cameron is a member of the Mars Society, a non-profit organization lobbying for the colonization of Mars. Cameron endorsed Democratic candidate Hillary Clinton for the 2016 United States presidential election.

In 2011, Cameron served as an executive producer for Sanctum, a disaster-survival film about a cave diving expedition which turns deadly. Although receiving mixed reviews, the film earned a fair $108 million at the worldwide box office. Cameron re-investigated the sinking of RMS Titanic with eight experts in a 2012 TV documentary special, Titanic: The Final Word with James Cameron, which premiered on April 8 on the National Geographic channel. In the feature, the experts revised the CGI animation of the sinking conceived in 1995. In March 2010, Cameron announced that Titanic would be converted and re-released in 3D to commemorate the centennial anniversary of the tragedy. On March 27, 2012, Titanic 3D premiered at London's Royal Albert Hall. He also served as executive producer of Cirque du Soleil: Worlds Away and Deepsea Challenge 3D in 2012 and 2014, respectively.

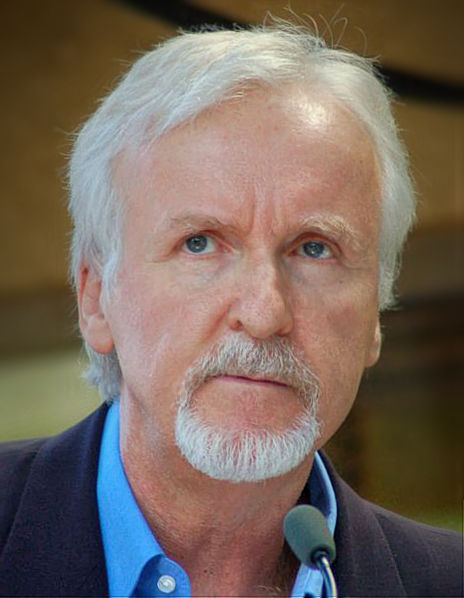
Cameron in October 2012

Cameron starred in the 2017 documentary Atlantis Rising, with collaborator Simcha Jacobovici. The pair goes on an adventure to explore the existence of the city of Atlantis. The programme aired on January 29 on National Geographic. Next, Cameron produced and appeared in a documentary about the history of science fiction. James Cameron's Story of Science Fiction, the six-episodic series was broadcast on AMC in 2018. The series featured interviews with guests including Ridley Scott, Steven Spielberg, George Lucas and Christopher Nolan. He stated: "Without Jules Verne and H. G. Wells, there wouldn't have been Ray Bradbury or Robert A. Heinlein, and without them, there wouldn't be [George] Lucas, [Steven] Spielberg, Ridley Scott or me".

Alita: Battle Angel was finally released in 2019, after being in parallel development with Avatar. Written by Cameron and friend Jon Landau, the film was directed by Robert Rodriguez and produced by Cameron. The film is based on a 1990s Japanese manga series Battle Angel Alita, depicting a cyborg who cannot remember anything of her past life and tries to uncover the truth. Produced with similar techniques and technology as in Avatar, the film starred Rosa Salazar, Christoph Waltz, Jennifer Connelly, Mahershala Ali, Ed Skrein, Jackie Earle Haley and Keean Johnson. The film premiered on January 31, 2019, to generally positive reviews and $404 million (equivalent to $501,100,000 in 2025) at the worldwide box office. In her review, Monica Castillo of RogerEbert.com called it "an awe-inspiring jump for [Rodriguez]" and "a visual bonanza", despite the bulky script. Cameron then returned to the Terminator franchise as producer and writer for Tim Miller's Terminator: Dark Fate (2019).

In August 2013, Cameron announced plans to direct three sequels to Avatar simultaneously, with production starting in 2014, and releases in December 2016, 2017, and 2018. However, the release dates were adjusted, with production on Avatar 2 and 3 not starting until 2017. Avatar 2 (later given the subtitle The Way of Water) and Avatar 3 (later given the subtitle Fire and Ash) began simultaneous production in Manhattan Beach, California on August 15, 2017. Principal photography began in New Zealand on September 25, 2017. (Note: Attributed to multiple references:) Parts of Avatar 4 were also filmed during this time. Cameron stated in a 2017 interview: "Let's face it, if Avatar 2 and 3 don't make enough money, there's not going to be a 4 and 5". Avatar: The Way of Water had its world premiere in London on December 6, 2022. It became the highest-grossing film released in 2022, and as of 2023 stood as the 3rd highest-grossing film of all time, behind only Avatar and Avengers: Endgame, and just ahead of Titanic.

Lightstorm Entertainment bought the film rights to the Taylor Stevens novel The Informationist, a thriller set in Africa with Cameron planning to direct. In 2010, he indicated he would adapt the Charles R. Pellegrino book The Last Train from Hiroshima, which is about the survivors of the atomic bombings of Hiroshima and Nagasaki. Cameron met with survivor Tsutomu Yamaguchi before his death in 2010. In 2024, Deadline Hollywood confirmed that Cameron had purchased the rights of not only The Last Train from Hiroshima, but also of Pellegrino's forthcoming Ghosts of Hiroshima, to make an "uncompromising theatrical epic motion picture" titled Last Train From Hiroshima about a Japanese man who survives Hiroshima's bombing at the height of World War II only to then take a train to Nagasaki's bombing, which he will shoot as soon as the Avatar sequels' production permits. Feeling that he and Pellegrino owe Yamaguchi for handing the baton of his personal story to them so they could pass his unique and harrowing experience to future generations, Cameron was assisted by the Avatar sequels co-writer Shane Salerno and Pellegrino, who previously served as Cameron's science consultant on Titanic and Avatar.

In 2025, Cameron announced that Lightstorm Entertainment had acquired the rights to Joe Abercrombie's novel The Devils and that he would begin working on a screenplay for a film based on the novel after completion of Avatar: Fire and Ash.

Avatar: Fire and Ash was released in December 2025.

Cameron directed Billie Eilish – Hit Me Hard and Soft: The Tour (Live in 3D), a concert film documenting Billie Eilish's Hit Me Hard and Soft: The Tour, released in May 2026.

=== Deep-sea and space exploration ===
Cameron has experience with deep-sea exploration, in part because of his work on The Abyss, Titanic, and Avatar: The Way of Water and his childhood fascination with shipwrecks. He has contributed to advancements in underwater filming and remotely operated vehicles, and helped develop the 3D Fusion Camera System. In 2011, Cameron became a National Geographic explorer-in-residence. In this role, on March 7, 2012, he dived five miles deep to the bottom of the New Britain Trench with the Deepsea Challenger. 19 days later, Cameron reached the Challenger Deep, the deepest part of the Mariana Trench. He spent more than three hours exploring the ocean floor, becoming the first to accomplish the trip alone. During his dive to the Challenger Deep, he discovered new species of sea cucumber, squid worm and a giant single-celled amoeba. He was preceded by unmanned dives in 1995 and 2009, as well as by Jacques Piccard and Don Walsh, the first men to reach the bottom of the Mariana Trench aboard the bathyscaphe Trieste in 1960.

In the aftermath of the Titan submersible implosion, Cameron said he was "struck by the similarity" between the submersible's implosion and the events that resulted in the Titanic disaster. He noted that both disasters seemed preventable, and were caused indirectly by someone deliberately ignoring safety warnings from others. Cameron criticized the company OceanGate and its late CEO Stockton Rush for their choice of carbon-fibre composite construction of the pressure vessel, saying it has "no strength in compression" when subject to the immense pressures at depth. Cameron said that pressure hulls should be made out of contiguous materials such as steel, titanium, ceramic, or acrylic, and that the wound carbon fibre of Titan's hull had seemed like a bad idea to him from the beginning. He stated that it was long known that composite hulls were vulnerable to microscopic water ingress, delamination, and progressive failure over time. He also criticized Rush's real-time monitoring of the hull as an inadequate solution that would do little to prevent an implosion. Cameron expressed regret for not being more outspoken about these concerns before the accident, and criticized what he termed "false hopes" being presented to the victims' families; he and his colleagues realized early on that for communication and tracking (the latter housed in a separate pressure vessel, with its own battery) to be lost simultaneously, the cause was almost certainly a catastrophic implosion.

In 2016, Premier Exhibitions, owner of many RMS Titanic artifacts, filed for bankruptcy. Cameron supported the UK's National Maritime Museum and National Museums Northern Ireland decision to bid for the artifacts, but they were acquired by an investment group before a formal bid took place.

Cameron also expressed a strong interest in visiting the space stations Mir and International Space Station (ISS). He spent the summer of 2000 in Moscow getting ready for a potential trip to space, and was offered an opportunity to go by NASA. However, the trip did not include a visit to the space station, so he declined the offer as it did not align with his terms. The shuttle flight he turned down was the tragic Space Shuttle Columbia. Cameron attended the memorial service for the victims of the disaster.

== Legal issues ==
In June 2013, British artist Roger Dean filed a copyright complaint against Cameron, seeking damages of $50 million (equivalent to $68,050,000 in 2025). The lawsuit stated that Cameron used and referenced Dean's designs in Avatar, accusing the filmmaker of "wilful and deliberate copying, dissemination and exploitation" of Dean's original images. The case was dismissed by US district judge Jesse Furman in 2014.

== Personal life ==
Cameron has been married five times and has five children. He was married to Sharon Williams from 1978 to 1984. A year after he and Williams divorced, Cameron married film producer Gale Anne Hurd, a close collaborator on his 1980s films. They divorced in 1989. Soon after separating from Hurd, Cameron met the director Kathryn Bigelow, whom he wed in 1989, the same year he divorced from Hurd; they divorced in 1991. Cameron then began a relationship with Linda Hamilton, the lead actress in The Terminator series. Their daughter was born in 1993. Cameron married Hamilton in 1997. Amid speculation of an affair between Cameron and actress Suzy Amis, Cameron and Hamilton separated after two years of marriage, with Hamilton receiving a settlement of $50 million. He married Amis, his fifth wife, in 2000. They have one son and two daughters together.

Cameron applied for American citizenship in 2004, but withdrew his application after President George W. Bush was re-elected in the presidential election. Cameron resided in the United States, but after filming Avatar in New Zealand, Cameron bought a home and a farm there in 2012. He divided his time between Malibu, California and New Zealand until 2020, after which he sold his Malibu home and decided to live in New Zealand permanently. He said in August 2020: "I plan to make all my future films in New Zealand, and I see the country having an opportunity to demonstrate to the international film industry how to safely return to work [after the COVID-19 pandemic]. Doing so with Avatar [sequels] will be a beacon that, when this [pandemic] is over, will attract more production to New Zealand and continue to stimulate the screen industry and the economy for years." In February 2025, Cameron was planning to formally become a New Zealand citizen. He was formally granted New Zealand citizenship at a ceremony on August 13, 2025.

Cameron is an atheist; he formerly associated himself with agnosticism, a stance he said he had come to see as "cowardly atheism." Since 2011, he is vegan. Cameron met close friend Guillermo del Toro on the production of his 1993 film, Cronos. In 1997, del Toro's father Federico was kidnapped in Guadalajara and Cameron gave del Toro more than $1 million (equivalent to $1,840,000 in 2025) in cash to pay a ransom and have his father released. Cameron had been friends with Titanic expert Paul-Henri Nargeolet for over 25 years before the latter's death.

Cameron joined the board of directors of AI company Stability AI in September 2024.

== Filmmaking style ==
=== Themes ===
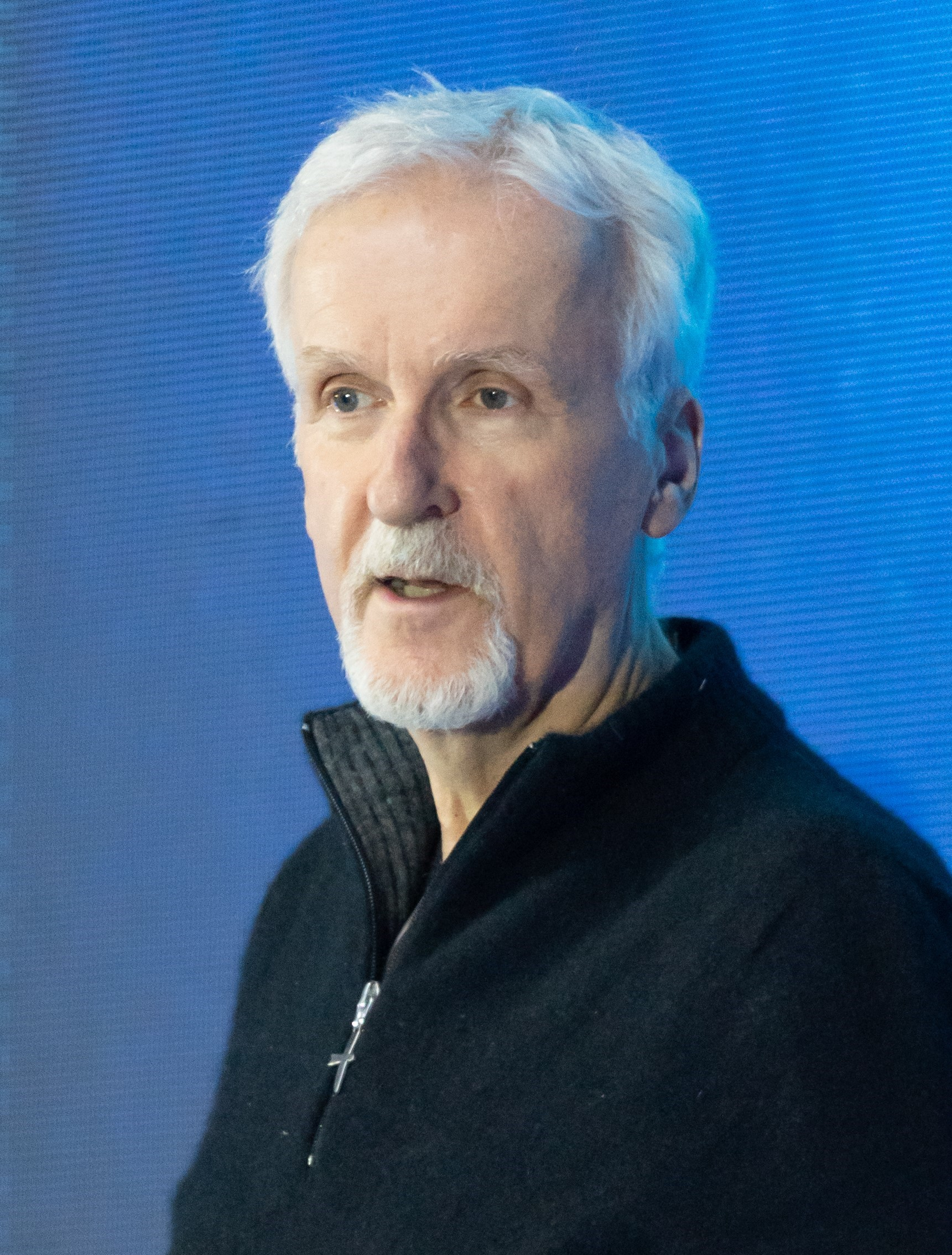
Cameron in 2022

Cameron's films are often based on themes which explore the conflicts between intelligent machines and humanity or nature, dangers of corporate greed, strong female characters, and a romance subplot. Cameron has further stated in an interview with The Talks: "All my movies are love stories". Both Titanic and Avatar are noted for featuring star-crossed lovers. The Avatar franchise also explores themes like family dynamics and grief. Characters suffering from emotionally intense and dramatic environments in the sea wilderness are explored in The Abyss and Titanic. The Terminator series amplifies technology as an enemy which could lead to devastation of mankind. Similarly, Avatar views tribal people as an honest group, whereas a "technologically advanced imperial culture is fundamentally evil". The danger of nuclear war, as featured in The Terminator, Terminator 2: Judgment Day and in his forthcoming Last Train From Hiroshima film, has been one of Cameron's fears since he watched the Cuban Missile Crisis unfold when he was eight years old.

=== Method ===
Cameron is regarded as an innovative filmmaker in the industry, with a classical filmmaking style, and a reputation of being not easy to work for. (Note: Attributed to multiple references:) Radio Times critic John Ferguson described Cameron as "the king of hi-tech thrillers". Dalin Rowell of /Film stated: "Known for his larger-than-life creations and unique filmmaking style, director James Cameron is in a league all of his own. With his genre-spanning work, lofty ambitions, and unrestrained energy, Cameron has carved out a name for himself in Hollywood as an artist willing to do anything to see his vision come true." Rebecca Keegan, author of The Futurist: The Life and Films of James Cameron, describes Cameron as "comically hands-on", and as someone who would try to do every job on the set. Andrew Gumbel of The Independent says that Cameron "is a nightmare to work with. Studios fear his habit of straying way over schedule and over budget. He is notorious on set for his uncompromising and dictatorial manner, as well as his flaming temper". Author Alexandra Keller writes that Cameron is an egomaniac, obsessed with vision, but praises his "technological ingenuity" at creating a "visceral viewing experience".

According to Ed Harris, who starred in Cameron's film The Abyss, Cameron behaved in an autocratic manner. Orson Scott Card, who novelized The Abyss, stated that Cameron "made everyone around him miserable, and his unkindness did nothing to improve the film in any way. Nor did it motivate people to work faster or better". Harris later said: "I like Jim. He's an incredibly talented, intelligent guy", adding that "it was always good to see him" in later years. Speaking of her experience on Titanic, Kate Winslet said that she admired Cameron, but "there were times I was genuinely frightened of him". Describing him as having "a temper like you wouldn't believe", she had said she would not work with him again unless it was "for a lot of money". Despite this, Winslet and Cameron still looked for future projects and Winslet was eventually cast in Avatar: The Way of Water. Her co-star Leonardo DiCaprio told Esquire: "When somebody felt a different way on the set, there was a confrontation. He lets you know exactly how he feels", but complimented Cameron, "he's of the lineage of John Ford. He knows what he wants his film to be." Sam Worthington, who starred in Avatar, said that if a mobile phone rang during filming, Cameron would "nail it to the wall with a nail gun". Composer James Horner was also not immune to Cameron's demands; he recalls having to write music in a short time frame for Aliens. After the experience, Horner did not work with Cameron for a decade. In 1996, they reconciled their friendship and Horner produced the soundtracks for Titanic and Avatar.

Despite this reputation, Sigourney Weaver has praised Cameron's perfectionism and attention to detail, saying: "He really does want us to risk our lives and limbs for the shot, but he doesn't mind risking his own". In 2015, Weaver and Jamie Lee Curtis both applauded Cameron in an interview. Curtis remarked: "He can do every other job [than acting]. I'm talking about every single department, from art direction to props to wardrobe to cameras, he knows more than everyone doing the job". Curtis also said Cameron "loves actors", while Weaver referred to Cameron as "so generous to actors" and a "genius". Michael Biehn, a frequent collaborator, also praised Cameron, saying that he "is a really passionate person. He cares more about his movies than other directors care about their movies", adding, "I've never seen him yell at anybody". Biehn acknowledged that Cameron is "not real sensitive when it comes to actors and their trailers, and waiting for actors to come to the set". Worthington commented: "He demands excellence. If you don't give it to him, you're going to get chewed out. And that's a good thing". When asked in 2012 about his reputation, Cameron dryly responded: "I don't have to shout any more, because the word is out there already".

In 2021, while giving a MasterClass during a break from his work on the Avatar sequels, Cameron acknowledged his past demanding behaviour, opining that if he could go back in time, he would improve the working relationship with his cast and crew members by being less autocratic, thinking of himself as a "tinpot dictator"; Cameron stated that when he visited one of Ron Howard's sets, he was "dumbfounded" at how much time Howard took to compliment his crew, aspiring to become "his inner Ron Howard".

=== Influence ===
Cameron's work has had an impact in the Hollywood film industry. The Avengers (2012), directed by Joss Whedon, was inspired by Cameron's approach to action sequences. Whedon also admires Cameron's ability for writing heroic female characters such as Ellen Ripley of Aliens, adding that he is "the leader and the teacher and the Yoda". Director Michael Bay idolizes Cameron and was convinced by him to use 3D cameras for filming Transformers: Dark of the Moon (2011). Cameron's approach to 3D inspired Baz Luhrmann during the production of The Great Gatsby (2013). Other directors that have been inspired by Cameron include Peter Jackson, Neill Blomkamp and Xavier Dolan.

When asked how Cameron uses technology in the Avatar films in a way that allow them to remain appealing to future generations without appearing dated, Cameron replied:

"I think people use the term technology, but really, I think it's our desire to create a kind of dreamlike reality that seems very lucid and very real and doesn't look like other movies. So, it's really about creating that journey, and I think everything conspires within that. It's not just the technology we use to capture the actors, for example, or to do the CG finish on it. It's all those things, but it's also the performance, it's the design, it's the music, it's the 3D. It's all of those things working together, kind of symphonically, to create a unique experience that you, as an audience member, feel is worth turning off your streaming, leaving the house, going to a place where you don't have control, and just going on that ride and having it come at you."

Cameron advises modern filmmakers to not replace actors with artificial intelligence, reasoning that while actors may be expensive, they are not generic but idiosyncratic. Cameron instead prescribes the use of artificial intelligence to be limited to beginners' previsualization, and that filmmakers should spend at least a year studying acting, citing his experiences with Sigourney Weaver and Zoe Saldaña as the reasons why he trusts actors.

== Filmography ==
Directed features
| Year | Title | Distributor |
|---|---|---|
| 1982 | Piranha II: The Spawning | Saturn International Pictures / Columbia Pictures |
| 1984 | The Terminator | Orion Pictures |
| 1986 | Aliens | 20th Century Fox |
| 1989 | The Abyss | 20th Century Fox |
| 1991 | Terminator 2: Judgment Day | TriStar Pictures |
| 1994 | True Lies | 20th Century Fox / Universal Pictures |
| 1997 | Titanic | Paramount Pictures / 20th Century Fox |
| 2009 | Avatar | 20th Century Studios |
| 2022 | Avatar: The Way of Water | 20th Century Studios |
| 2025 | Avatar: Fire and Ash | 20th Century Studios |

== Frequent collaborators ==
Individuals are actors unless marked otherwise.

| Work Person | 1982 | 1984 | 1986 | 1989 | 1991 | 1994 | 1997 | 2009 | 2022 | 2025 | Total |
| Work Person | Piranha II: The Spawning | The Terminator | Aliens | The Abyss | Terminator 2: Judgment Day | True Lies | Titanic | Avatar | Avatar: The Way of Water | Avatar: Fire and Ash | Total |
|---|---|---|---|---|---|---|---|---|---|---|---|
| Lance Henriksen | Yes | Yes | Yes | | | | | | | | 3 |
| Arnold Schwarzenegger | | Yes | | | Yes | Yes | | | | | 3 |
| Michael Biehn | | Yes | Yes | Yes | (Note: 1993 special edition only) | | | | | | 3 |
| Bill Paxton | | Yes | Yes | | | Yes | Yes | | | | 4 |
| Sigourney Weaver | | | Yes | | | | | Yes | Yes | Yes | 4 |
| Jenette Goldstein | | | Yes | | Yes | | Yes | | | | 3 |
| Kate Winslet | | | | | | | Yes | | Yes | Yes | 3 |
| Sam Worthington | | | | | | | | Yes | Yes | Yes | 3 |
| Zoe Saldaña | | | | | | | | Yes | Yes | Yes | 3 |
| Stephen Lang | | | | | | | | Yes | Yes | Yes | 3 |
| Giovanni Ribisi | | | | | | | | Yes | Yes | Yes | 3 |
| Joel David Moore | | | | | | | | Yes | Yes | Yes | 3 |
| CCH Pounder | | | | | | | | Yes | Yes | Yes | 3 |
| Dileep Rao | | | | | | | | Yes | Yes | Yes | 3 |
| Matt Gerald | | | | | | | | Yes | Yes | Yes | 3 |
| Gale Anne Hurd (producer) | | Yes | Yes | Yes | Yes | | | | | | 4 |
| Jon Landau (producer) | | | | | | | Yes | Yes | Yes | Yes | 4 |
| Adam Greenberg (cinematographer) | | Yes | | | Yes | | | | | | 2 |
| Russell Carpenter (cinematographer) | | | | | | Yes | Yes | | Yes | Yes | 4 |
| Mark Goldblatt (editor) | | Yes | | | Yes | Yes | | | | | 3 |
| Conrad Buff IV (editor) | | | | Yes | Yes | Yes | Yes | | | | 4 |
| Richard A. Harris (editor) | | | | | Yes | Yes | Yes | | | | 3 |
| Stephen E. Rivkin (editor) | | | | | | | | Yes | Yes | Yes | 3 |
| John Refoua (editor) | | | | | | | | Yes | Yes | Yes | 3 |
| David Brenner (editor) | | | | | | | | | Yes | Yes | 2 |
| Brad Fiedel (composer) | | Yes | | | Yes | Yes | | | | | 3 |
| James Horner (composer) | | | Yes | | | | Yes | Yes | | | 3 |
| Simon Franglen (composer) | | | | | | | | | Yes | Yes | 2 |
| John Bruno (VFX artist) | | | | Yes | Yes | Yes | Yes | Yes | | | 5 |

== Awards and recognition ==
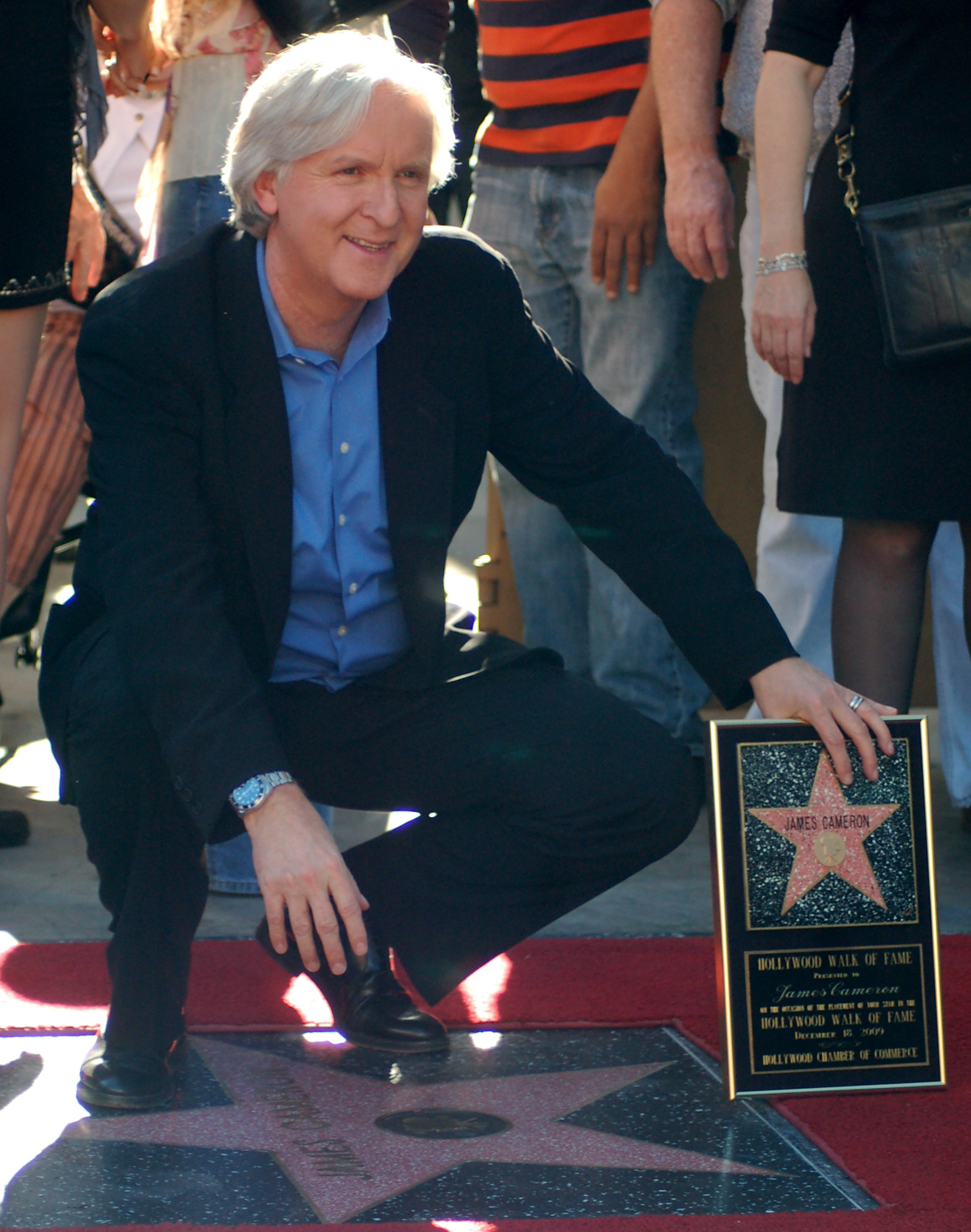
Cameron receiving a star on the Hollywood Walk of Fame, December 2009

Cameron received the inaugural Ray Bradbury Award from the Science Fiction and Fantasy Writers of America in 1992 for Terminator 2: Judgment Day. In recognition of "a distinguished career as a Canadian filmmaker", Carleton University awarded Cameron the honorary degree of Doctor of Fine Arts on June 13, 1998. Cameron received the Golden Plate Award of the American Academy of Achievement in 1998, presented by Awards Council member George Lucas. He also received an honorary doctorate in 1998 from Brock University in St. Catharines, Ontario, for his accomplishments in the international film industry. In 1998, Cameron attended a convocation to receive an honorary degree from Ryerson University, Toronto. The university awards its highest honor to those who have made extraordinary contributions in Canada or internationally. A year later, Cameron received the honorary Doctor of Fine Arts degree from California State University, Fullerton. He accepted the degree at the university's summer annual commencement exercise.

Cameron's work has been recognized by the Academy of Motion Picture Arts and Sciences; as one of the few directors to have won three Academy Awards in a single year. For Titanic, he won Best Director, Best Picture (shared with Jon Landau) and Best Film Editing (shared with Conrad Buff and Richard A. Harris). In 2009, he was nominated for awards in Best Film Editing (shared with John Refoua and Stephen E. Rivkin, Best Director and Best Picture for Avatar. Cameron has won two Golden Globes: Best Director for Titanic and Avatar.

In recognition of his contributions to underwater filming and remote vehicle technology, University of Southampton awarded Cameron the honorary degree of doctor of the university in July 2004. Cameron accepted the award at the National Oceanography Centre. In 2008, Cameron received a star on Canada's Walk of Fame and a year later, received the 2,396th star on the Hollywood Walk of Fame. On February 28, 2010, Cameron was honored with a Visual Effects Society (VES) Lifetime Achievement Award. In June 2012, Cameron was inducted to The Science Fiction Hall of Fame at the Museum of Pop Culture for his contribution to the science fiction and fantasy field. Cameron collaborated with Walt Disney Imagineering and served as a creative consultant on Pandora – The World of Avatar, an Avatar-themed land at Disney's Animal Kingdom in Florida which opened to the public on May 27, 2017. A species of frog, Pristimantis jamescameroni, was named after Cameron for his work in promoting environmental awareness and advocacy of veganism.

In 2010, Time magazine named Cameron one of the 100 most influential people in the world. That same year, he was ranked at the top of the list in The Guardian Film Power 100 and in 30th place in New Statesman's list of "The World's 50 Most Influential Figures 2010". In 2013, Cameron received the Nierenberg Prize for Science in the Public, which is annually awarded by the Scripps Institution of Oceanography. In 2019, Cameron was appointed as a Companion of the Order of Canada by Governor General Julie Payette, giving him the Post Nominal Letters "CC" for life.

In 2020, Cameron was the subject of the second season of the Epicleff Media dramatic podcast Blockbuster. The audio drama, created and narrated by Emmy Award-winning journalist and filmmaker Matt Schrader, chronicles Cameron's life and career (leading up to the creation and release of Titanic), and stars actor Ross Marquand in the lead voice role as Cameron.

Cameron was appointed as an Officer of the Legion of Honour in February 2025, the highest and most prestigious order of merit in France. He will officially be presented with the award at the 2025 United Nations Ocean Conference in Nice, where he will be one of the guests of honour.

In 2026, he was named a recipient of the Governor General's Performing Arts Award.

Awards and nominations received by Cameron's films
| Year | Title | Academy Awards | | BAFTA Awards | | Golden Globe Awards | |
| Year | Title | Nominations | Wins | Nominations | Wins | Nominations | Wins |
|---|---|---|---|---|---|---|---|
| 1986 | Aliens | 7 | 2 | 4 | 1 | 1 | |
| 1989 | The Abyss | 4 | 1 | | | | |
| 1991 | Terminator 2: Judgment Day | 6 | 4 | 3 | 2 | | |
| 1994 | True Lies | 1 | | 1 | | 1 | 1 |
| 1997 | Titanic | 14 | 11 | 10 | | 8 | 4 |
| 2009 | Avatar | 9 | 3 | 8 | 2 | 4 | 2 |
| 2022 | Avatar: The Way of Water | 4 | 1 | 2 | 1 | 2 | |
| 2025 | Avatar: Fire and Ash | 2 | 1 | 1 | 1 | 2 | |
| Total | | 47 | 23 | 29 | 7 | 18 | 7 |

Directed Academy Award performances
Under Cameron's direction, these actresses have received Academy Award nominations for their performances in their respective roles.

| Year | Performer | Film | Result |
Academy Award for Best Actress
| 1986 | Sigourney Weaver | Aliens | Nominated |
| 1997 | Kate Winslet | Titanic | Nominated |
Academy Award for Best Supporting Actress
| 1997 | Gloria Stuart | Titanic | Nominated |

== See also ==
- Hans Hass Award
- James Cameron's unrealized projects
- List of people who descended to Challenger Deep
- List of Canadian Academy Award winners and nominees
- List of New Zealand Academy Award winners and nominees
- List of atheists in film, radio, television and theater
- List of vegans
