= Randall Frakes =

American writer

- Born: 27 April 1947; United States
- Died: 25 June 2023
- Occupations: Writer, author, screenwriter, photographer, producer
- Notable work: The Terminator; Terminator 2: Judgment Day; Titanic

Randall Frakes was a film and science fiction writer primarily known for his novelization work with long-time friends Bill Wisher and James Cameron on The Terminator and Terminator 2: Judgment Day.

While Frakes was in the U.S. Army, he was stationed in Europe, where he edited the newspaper for the 16th Signal Battalion. While editor, he won a Stars and Stripes award for investigative journalism.

After the Army, he earned a degree in Film Writing and Production from Columbia College, while also writing for Analog, Fantastic, and Fantasy & Science Fiction.

His first film work was as a special effects cameraman for Roger Corman, and a number of unproduced screenplays, before his collaborations with Wisher and Cameron, initiated his film-writing career.

Frakes died on 25 June 2023.

== Filmography ==
- Xenogenesis (1978 short), writer, director, and producer (with James Cameron)
- Battle Beyond the Stars (1980), additional photographer
- Escape from New York (1981), photographic effects
- Galaxy of Terror (1981), photographic effects
- Last Thirty Days of Liberty, unproduced screenplay
- Deathlok, unproduced screenplay
- Roller Blade (1986), screenplay
- Hell Comes to Frogtown (1987), story, screenplay and producer
- Roller Blade Warriors: Taken by Force (1989), screenplay (as Lloyd Strathern) and lyrics
- Diplomatic Immunity (1991), screenplay
- The Divine Enforcer (1992), ghostwriter
- Twisted Fate (1993/II), writer and producer
- The Force (1994), writer
- Blowback (2000), screenplay
- Sacrifice (2000), written by
- Devil's Prey (2001), writer
- Instinct to Kill (2001), writer
- Stealing Candy (2002), screenplay
- Bad Karma (2001), writer
- Empires of the Deep (unreleased), screenplay

== Bibliography ==
- The Terminator (1984, ISBN 0-553-25317-4), novelization
- Terminator 2: Judgment Day (1991, ISBN 0-553-29169-6), novelization
- Titanic: James Cameron's Illustrated Screenplay (1998, ISBN 0-06-095307-1)
- #Obsession: Freeing Yourself from Social Media Disorder (2016, ISBN 978-1-4809-6674-1)
