= The Last Train from Hiroshima =

2010 book by Charles R. Pellegrino

The Last Train From Hiroshima
- First edition cover
- Author: Charles R. Pellegrino
- Original title: The Last Train From Hiroshima: The Survivors Look Back.
- Illustrator: Patricia Wynne
- Cover artist: Kelly S. Too
- Language: English
- Subject: History
- Publisher: Henry Holt and Company
- Publication date: January 19, 2010
- ISBN: 978-0-8050-8796-3
- Dewey Decimal: 940.5425

The Last Train From Hiroshima: The Survivors Look Back is a book by American author Charles R. Pellegrino and published on January 19, 2010 by Henry Holt and Company that documents life in Hiroshima and Nagasaki in the time immediately preceding, during and following the aftermath of the atomic bombings of Japan. The story focuses on individuals such as Tsutomu Yamaguchi, a hibakusha (explosion-affected person) who was the only person confirmed by the government of Japan to have survived the pika-don (flash-bang) of both attacks. The story of the impacts in Japan on the residents of the two targeted cities and of the response of the Japanese government to the attack is interwoven with details of the Americans who carried out the missions and their reactions to the damage they had wrought.

Pellegrino faced criticism from members of the 509th Composite Group, the unit created by the United States Army Air Forces tasked with operational deployment of the two nuclear weapons, for including extensive details provided by Joseph Fuoco, who falsely claimed to have been aboard the mission to Hiroshima as flight engineer as a last-minute substitute. Questions were also raised about the existence of two characters described as survivors. After further investigation Henry Holt announced that it was suspending further publication of the book. The book was re-released in 2015 under the title To Hell and Back: The Last Train From Hiroshima.

== The book ==
Yamaguchi, an employee of Mitsubishi Heavy Industries, had been in Hiroshima on a business trip on August 6, 1945, when the Enola Gay dropped the Little Boy atomic bomb on that city with Yamaguchi located about two miles from the hypocenter. After a night amid the devastation in that city he returned by train with a number of other bomb survivors to his hometown of Nagasaki, where he was reporting back to his superiors at Mitsubishi about his experiences in Hiroshima when the Fat Man bomb was detonated over that city. Pellegrino follows what could have been as many as 165 double survivors in what Dwight Garner of The New York Times Book Review called a "sober and authoritative new book" that stands as "a firm, compelling synthesis of earlier memoirs and archival material" that could be described as "John Hersey infused with Richard Preston and a fleck of Michael Crichton".

Pellegrino documents the random nature of survival, with people who had been outdoors wiped off the face of the earth in a fraction of a second, while others who had been indoors and were afforded protection in "shock cocoons" from the gamma rays and the heat blast survived. People who had been outdoors or exposed to windows facing the explosion and were wearing dark-colored clothing received severe burns, while those wearing white suffered less of an effect. Those wearing patterned or striped clothing suffered burns on their skin that matched the designs of their clothing. The shock to those who found themselves to have survived the bombing turned many into "ant walkers", following other survivors in lines walking aimlessly through the destroyed cities. At times they encountered "alligator people", whose skin had been so badly charred that their exteriors became reptilian in appearance.

He follows the experiences of doctors who had emerged from the rubble of their hospitals only to find themselves with little of the medical equipment and supplies that were so desperately needed. Some patients who had initially appeared to have survived the bomb without a scratch suffered no ill effects for a few days and then suddenly started vomiting, losing their hair, and bleeding to death as a result of the effects of the then-unknown condition of radiation poisoning.

== Withdrawal and revision ==
Facing criticism from groups that had questioned aspects of the book, publisher Henry Holt and Company suspended printing as Pellegrino "had relied on a fraudulent source for a portion of the book and possibly fabricated others". Pellegrino said that he had trusted Joseph Fuoco, who had claimed to be a replacement flight engineer on one of the planes that escorted the Enola Gay to Hiroshima. John Macrae, who edited the book for the publisher, said that he had questioned and received confirmation of hundreds of sections of the book. Macrae said that he had heard claims from scientist friends that the original atomic bomb had been involved in an accident and that his focus had been on confirming aspects of the book involving survivors, including efforts to speak with double survivor Yamaguchi. Richard Rhodes, author of The Making of the Atomic Bomb said that he would have sought stronger confirmation for aspects of Pellegrino's story that represented "a radical change in the historical record". Pellegrino also faced questions about the existence of Father Mattias, a priest who was said to have survived the bomb in Hiroshima, and of John MacQuitty, who the book said officiated at his funeral. However, director James Cameron defended Pellegrino, saying "All I know is that Charlie would not fabricate so there must be a reason for the misunderstanding" and believes that it was caused by "elaborate deception to create a false account."

In early March 2010, the publisher announced that "It is with deep regret that Henry Holt and Company announces that we will not print, correct or ship copies" of the book. On June 16, 2015 a review for the new, revised edition of the book was released. Released August 6, 2015, To Hell and Back: The Last Train From Hiroshima features new witness accounts and removal of the veteran who had exaggerated his war record. It was published by Rowman & Littlefield.

== Adaptations ==
In 2010, director James Cameron optioned the book with the possibility of turning it into a feature film. After the release of Avatar: The Way of Water, Cameron said in an interview with the Los Angeles Times that he would likely adapt the novel before the release of Avatar 4, saying "the Hiroshima film would be as timely as ever, if not more so".
