= Xenogenesis (film) =

- Directed by: James Cameron; Randall Frakes
- Written by: James Cameron; Randall Frakes
- Produced by: James Cameron; Randall Frakes; Alvin J. Weinberg
- Starring: William Wisher Jr.; Margaret Umbel
- Cinematography: James Cameron
- Edited by: James Cameron
- Music by: Bernard Hearmann
- Release date: 1978
- Running time: 12 minutes
- Country: United States
- Language: English
- Budget: $20,000

Xenogenesis is a 1978 Canadian-American science fiction short film written, directed and produced by James Cameron and Randall Frakes. It was the first film in both of their careers, with Cameron also acting as cinematographer, editor, production designer, and visual effects supervisor. Twelve-minutes long, it stars William Wisher Jr. as a man and a woman exploring a long-abandonned spaceship, only to find themselves facing a giant robot.

== Plot ==
Raj, an engineered man, trained to deliver humanity from the final cataclysm, and Laurie, (a woman raised by a machine, but she alone knew the power of love), are sent on a gigantic sentient starship to search space for a place to start new life. Having come across a derelict starship belonging to an unknown people said to have been dead for fifty thousand years, Raj decides to investigate. He comes across a gigantic robotic cleaner, which attacks him and he ends up hanging from a ledge. Laurie arrives to help him, sitting inside of and controlling a vehicle which walks on four legs. Raj instructs her to go back to their ship, but she refuses and engages the robot in combat. The film ends with Raj still hanging from the ledge; Laurie is pushing the robot towards the edge where he is hanging; while the robot fights to not go over it.

== Cast ==
- William Wisher Jr. as Raj
- Margaret Umbel as Laurie

== Production ==
Cameron raised $20,000 from a group of local dentists to fund the film. Most of the film was shot in his living room and the methods he used were self taught. Learning as they went, Cameron said he felt like a doctor doing his first surgical procedure.

In A Critical Companion to James Cameron, the author found themes in Xenogenesis that would be repeated in later films Cameron would direct. They also commented that a scene in Aliens (1986) where Ripley yells at the Queen Alien was similar to a scene in this film. It was also noted that many of the themes that would appear in later Cameron movies, including a strong female character, can be first found here.

The dentist pulled out of the project based on a demonstration screening. Producer Roger Corman was impressed enough with the project to hire Cameron to work on projects that would become Battle Beyond the Stars and Piranha II.
