= The Exodus Decoded =

2006 television film directed by Simcha Jacobovici

- DVD cover art
- Genre: Documentary; Religion
- Created by: Simcha Jacobovici; James Cameron
- Written by: Simcha Jacobovici
- Directed by: Simcha Jacobovici
- Countries of origin: Canada; Egypt; Greece
- Original language: English

Production
- Producer: James Cameron
- Running time: 92 minutes

Original release
- Network: History Channel
- Release: April 16, 2006

The Exodus Decoded is a 2006 documentary film by "investigative archaeologist" and filmmaker Simcha Jacobovici and "producer/director" James Cameron. It aired on April 16 on The History Channel. The documentary proposes naturalistic origins for the plagues of Egypt as described in the Book of Exodus. The documentary first aired on Discovery Channel Canada on April 16, 2006.

== Premise ==
The documentary deals with The Exodus, the founding story of the Israelites. While few mainstream historians would consider the Book of Exodus as a reliable narrative, Cameron and Jacobovici present a speculative question as to whether the events as described, particularly relating to the plagues of Egypt, could be explained naturalistically. Central to its thesis is the volcanic eruption of Thera/Santorini.

A suggested date of 1500 BC is made for the Exodus, during the reign of pharaoh Ahmose I. The "palpable darkness" described as the 9th plague, is hypothetically attributed to the cloud of volcanic ash caused by the Minoan eruption, which is identified as the events described in the Tempest Stele. A conjectural limnic eruption in the Nile Delta, similar to that of the Lake Nyos disaster in 1986, is explored as a further source of mass death.

Jacobovici referenced the Lake Nyos disaster to support his theory that the Biblical plagues, including the Nile River turning to “blood”, the mass death of livestock, outbreaks of boils, and the death of the firstborn, may have been caused by environmental effects associated with the Minoan eruption on Santorini around 1600 BCE. Jacobovici further proposed that the Exodus may have coincided with the eruption, arguing that related seismic activity could have contributed to events described in the biblical narrative, including the plagues and the parting of the Red Sea. He also suggested that the biblical Red Sea may have referred to a freshwater lake near modern-day Ismailia. His theories were criticised by archaeologist Manfred Bietak, who stated that the documentary misrepresented his research and argued that there was no archaeological evidence for the existence of the Israelites prior to the Iron Age.

== Reception ==
As a popular history documentary, The Exodus Decoded attracted few critiques from mainstream scholars. The Washington Post described the use of CGI as "stunning", a view shared by The New York Times, which placed the documentary's content firmly in the realms of conspiracy theory. A review in The Jerusalem Post noted that none of the arguments made in the film were accepted by mainstream archaeology and that film-maker Jacobovici freely admitted his lack of academic credentials.

== See also ==
- Passage of the Red Sea
- Tempest Stele (alt. Storm Stele, erected by pharaoh Ahmose I, and called Akmose/Ahmose stele in the film)
- Thera (Santorini) eruption Association with the Exodus
- Plagues of Egypt
