= List of awards and nominations received by James Cameron =

James Cameron awards and nominations
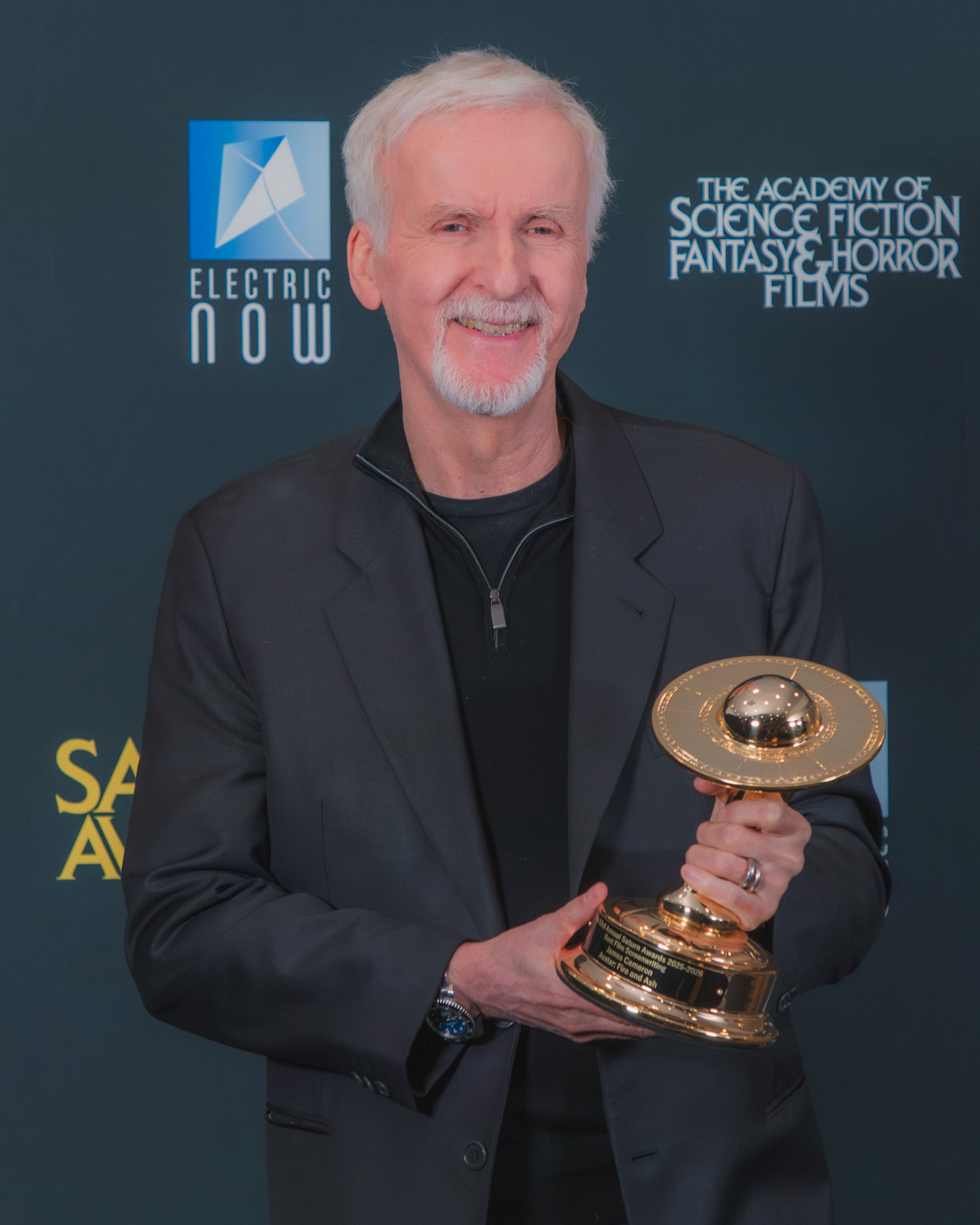
- Cameron at the 53rd Saturn Awards in 2026
Awards and nominations
Award	Wins	Nominations
Academy Awards	3	7
British Academy Film Awards	0	6
Directors Guild of America Awards	1	2
Golden Globes	4	8
Grammy Awards	0	1
Primetime Emmy Awards	2	4
Producers Guild of America Awards	3	5
Writers Guild of America Awards	1	3

Totals (Note: Certain award groups do not simply award one winner. They acknowledge several different recipients, have runners-up, and have third place. Since this is a specific recognition and is different from losing an award, runner-up mentions are considered wins in this award tally. For simplification and to avoid errors, each award in this list has been presumed to have had a prior nomination.)
- Wins: 70
- Nominations: 125

James Cameron is a Canadian director, producer, screenwriter and editor who has received numerous accolades throughout his career.

Cameron first gained recognition for writing and directing science fiction films including The Terminator (1984), Aliens (1986), The Abyss (1989) and Terminator 2: Judgment Day (1991), for which he won various awards that honor sci-fi projects, such as the Hugo Awards, the Nebula Awards, and the Saturn Awards. In 2026, he won his seventh Saturn Award for Best Director, holding the record for being the most awarded individual in this category.

In 1997, he wrote, directed, edited and produced the epic romance film Titanic, one of the most expensive films ever made. Released to critical acclaim and commercial success, it became the first picture to gross $1 billion at the box office. It received a record-tying fourteen nominations at the 1998 Academy Awards and became the second film in history to win eleven Oscars, with Cameron winning Best Picture, Best Director and Best Film Editing. For Titanic, he also won a Directors Guild of America Award, two Golden Globes, a Producers Guild of America Award and received three nominations at the 1998 British Academy Film Awards.

In 2009, Avatar, Cameron's first feature film in twelve years, was released. It broke several box office records and on January 25, 2010, became the highest-grossing film in history. At the 2010 Academy Awards, Avatar received nine nominations, with Cameron being the recipient of three of them. He won Best Motion Picture – Drama and Best Director at the 2010 Golden Globe Awards, and Best Editing at the 2010 Critics' Choice Awards. He received a seventh Academy Award nomination for Avatar: The Way of Water (2022), the second of the five planned films of the Avatar franchise.

Cameron has been nominated for four Primetime Emmy Awards, winning Outstanding Documentary or Nonfiction Series in 2014 for producing the Showtime documentary television series Years of Living Dangerously, and in 2021 for producing the Disney+ nature documentary series Secrets of the Whales.

== Major associations ==
=== Academy Awards ===
Year	Category	Nominated work	Result	Ref.
1998	Best Picture (Note: shared with Jon Landau)	Titanic	Won	
1998	Best Director	Titanic	Won	
1998	Best Film Editing (Note: shared with Conrad Buff and Richard A. Harris)	Titanic	Won	
2010	Best Picture	Avatar	Nominated	
2010	Best Director	Avatar	Nominated	
2010	Best Film Editing (Note: shared with Stephen E. Rivkin and John Refoua)	Avatar	Nominated	
2023	Best Picture	Avatar: The Way of Water	Nominated	

=== BAFTA Awards ===
Year	Category	Nominated work	Result	Ref.
British Academy Film Awards
1997	Best Film	Titanic	Nominated	
1997	Best Director	Titanic	Nominated	
1997	Best Editing	Titanic	Nominated	
2009	Best Film	Avatar	Nominated	
2009	Best Director	Avatar	Nominated	
2009	Best Editing	Avatar	Nominated	

=== Critics' Choice Awards ===
Year	Category	Nominated work	Result	Ref.
1997	Best Director	Titanic	Won	
2009	Best Director	Avatar	Nominated	
2009	Best Editing	Avatar	Won	
2022	Best Director	Avatar: The Way of Water	Nominated	
2022	Best Editing (Note: shared with David Brenner, John Refoua and Stephen Rivkin)	Avatar: The Way of Water	Nominated	

=== Emmy Awards ===
Year	Category	Nominated work	Result	Ref.
Primetime Emmy Awards
2003	Outstanding Directing for Nonfiction Programming (Note: shared with Gary Johnstone)	Expedition: Bismarck	Nominated	
2014	Outstanding Documentary or Nonfiction Series (Note: shared with Daniel Abbasi, Joel Bach, Adam Bolt, David Gelber, Solly Granatstein, Jacob Kornbluth, Jennifer Latham, Arnold Schwarzenegger and Jerry Weintraub)	Years of Living Dangerously	Won (Note: tied with American Masters)	
2021	Outstanding Documentary or Nonfiction Series (Note: shared with Pamela Caragol, Kevin Krug, Sam LeGrys, Shannon Malone-deBenedictis, Brian Skerry and Maria Wilhelm)	Secrets of the Whales	Won	
2024	Outstanding Documentary or Nonfiction Series (Note: shared with Lucinda Axelsson, Kim Butts, Pamela Caragol, Jonathan Frisby, Caroline Hawkins, Dr. Paula Kahumbu and Maria Wilhelm)	Secrets of the Elephants	Nominated	
News and Documentary Emmy Awards
2023	Outstanding Nature Documentary (Note: shared with the production team of Super/Natural)	Super/Natural	Nominated	
2026	Outstanding Nature Documentary (Note: shared with the production team of Secrets of the Penguins)	Secrets of the Penguins	Won	

=== Golden Globes ===
Year	Category	Nominated work	Result	Ref.
1998	Best Motion Picture – Drama	Titanic	Won	
1998	Best Director	Titanic	Won	
1998	Best Screenplay	Titanic	Nominated	
2010	Best Motion Picture – Drama	Avatar	Won	
2010	Best Director	Avatar	Won	
2023	Best Motion Picture – Drama	Avatar: The Way of Water	Nominated	
2023	Best Director	Avatar: The Way of Water	Nominated	
2026	Best Cinematic and Box Office Achievement (Note: The award for Best Cinematic and Box Office Achievement is given to the individual producers accredited by the Producers Guild of America for the film.)	Avatar: Fire and Ash	Nominated	

=== Grammy Awards ===
Year	Category	Nominated work	Result	Ref.
2027	Best Music Film	Hit Me Hard and Soft: The Tour Live	Pending	

== Awards and nominations ==
Awards and nominations received by James Cameron
Award	Year (Note: Indicates the year of ceremony.)	Nominated work	Category	Result	Ref.
AARP Movies for Grownups Awards	2023	Avatar: The Way of Water	Best Director	Nominated	
ACE Eddie Awards	1998	Titanic	Best Edited Feature Film – Dramatic	Won	
ACE Eddie Awards	2000	—N/a	Golden Eddie Filmmaker of the Year	Won	
ACE Eddie Awards	2010	Avatar	Best Edited Feature Film – Dramatic	Nominated	
Amanda Awards	1998	Titanic	Best Foreign Feature Film	Won	
AACTA International Awards	2023	Avatar: The Way of Water	Best Film	Won	
AACTA International Awards	2023	Avatar: The Way of Water	Best Direction	Nominated	
Blue Ribbon Awards	1998	Titanic	Best Foreign Film	Won	
César Awards	1999	Titanic	Best Foreign Film	Nominated	
César Awards	2010	Avatar	Best Foreign Film	Nominated	
Chicago Film Critics Association Awards	1998	Titanic	Best Director	Nominated	
Dallas–Fort Worth Film Critics Association Awards	1998	Titanic	Best Director	Won	
David di Donatello Awards	2010	Avatar	Best Foreign Film	Nominated	
Directors Guild of America Awards	1998	Titanic	Outstanding Directing – Feature Film	Won	
Directors Guild of America Awards	2010	Avatar	Outstanding Directing – Feature Film	Nominated	
Disney Legends Awards	2024	—N/a	Honoree	Won	
Empire Awards	2010	Avatar	Best Director	Won	
Fangoria Chainsaw Awards	1992	Terminator 2: Judgment Day	Best Screenplay (Note: shared with William Wisher Jr.)	Nominated	
Golden Raspberry Awards	1986	Rambo: First Blood Part II	Worst Screenplay (Note: shared with Kevin Jarre and Sylvester Stallone)	Won	
Hollywood Critics Association Film Awards	2023	Avatar: The Way of Water	Best Director	Nominated	
Hollywood Professional Association Awards	2010	Avatar	Outstanding Editing – Feature Film	Nominated	
Houston Film Critics Society Awards	2009	Avatar	Best Director	Nominated	
Hugo Awards	1987	Aliens	Best Dramatic Presentation (Note: shared with David Giler and Walter Hill)	Won	
Hugo Awards	1990	The Abyss	Best Dramatic Presentation	Nominated	
Hugo Awards	1992	Terminator 2: Judgment Day	Best Dramatic Presentation	Won	
Hugo Awards	2010	Avatar	Best Dramatic Presentation	Nominated	
Hugo Awards	2023	Avatar: The Way of Water	Best Dramatic Presentation (Note: shared with Rick Jaffa and Amanda Silver)	Nominated	
International Documentary Association Awards	2014	Years of Living Dangerously	Best Limited Series (Note: shared with Daniel Abbasi, Joel Bach, David Gelber, Arnold Schwarzenegger and Jerry Weintraub)	Nominated	
Jules Verne Awards	2004	—N/a	Cinematic Achievement	Won	
Jupiter Awards	1998	Titanic	Best International Film	Won	
Jupiter Awards	1998	Titanic	Best International Director	Won	
Jupiter Awards	2010	Avatar	Best International Film	Won	
Jupiter Awards	2023	Avatar: The Way of Water	Best International Film	Won	
Kansas City Film Critics Circle Awards	1997	Titanic	Best Director	Won	
Las Vegas Film Critics Society Awards	1998	Titanic	Best Director	Won	
London Film Critics' Circle Awards	1999	Titanic	Director of the Year	Nominated	
London Film Critics' Circle Awards	2010	Avatar	Director of the Year	Nominated	
Malibu Film Festival Awards	1999	—N/a	Lifetime Achievement	Won	
Nastro d'Argento Awards	2010	Avatar	Best 3D Film	Won	
National Board of Review Awards	1998	Titanic	Special Citation	Won	
Nebula Awards	1991	Terminator 2: Judgment Day	Ray Bradbury Award	Won	
Online Film Critics Society Awards	1998	Titanic	Best Director	Won	
Online Film Critics Society Awards	2010	Avatar	Best Director	Nominated	
Paris Film Critics Association Awards	2023	Avatar: The Way of Water	Best Picture	Nominated	
Paris Film Critics Association Awards	2023	Avatar: The Way of Water	Best Director	Won	
Phoenix Film Critics Society Awards	2009	Avatar	Best Film Editing	Won	
Producers Guild of America Awards	1998	Titanic	Outstanding Producer of Theatrical Motion Pictures	Won	
Producers Guild of America Awards	2004	—N/a	Visionary Award	Won	
Producers Guild of America Awards	2010	Avatar	Outstanding Producer of Theatrical Motion Pictures	Nominated	
Producers Guild of America Awards	2011	—N/a	Milestone Award	Won	
Producers Guild of America Awards	2023	Avatar: The Way of Water	Outstanding Producer of Theatrical Motion Pictures	Nominated	
San Diego Film Critics Society Awards	2009	Avatar	Best Director	Runner-up	
San Diego Film Critics Society Awards	2023	Avatar: The Way of Water	Best Editing (Note: shared with David Brenner, John Refoua, Stephen Rivkin and Ian Silverstein)	Nominated	
Santa Barbara International Film Festival Awards	2006	—N/a	David Attenborough Award for Excellence in Nature Filmmaking	Won	
Santa Barbara International Film Festival Awards	2010	—N/a	Maltin Modern Master Award	Won	
Satellite Awards	1998	Titanic	Best Director	Won	
Satellite Awards	1998	Titanic	Best Original Screenplay	Nominated	
Satellite Awards	1998	Titanic	Best Editing (Note: shared with Conrad Buff)	Won	
Satellite Awards	2004	—N/a	Nikola Tesla Satellite Award	Won	
Satellite Awards	2023	Avatar: The Way of Water	Best Director	Won	
Satellite Awards	2026	Avatar: Fire and Ash	Best Director	Nominated	
Saturn Awards	1985	The Terminator	Best Director	Nominated	
Saturn Awards	1985	The Terminator	Best Writing (Note: shared with Gale Anne Hurd)	Won	
Saturn Awards	1987	Aliens	Best Director	Won	
Saturn Awards	1987	Aliens	Best Writing	Won	
Saturn Awards	1991	The Abyss	Best Director	Won	
Saturn Awards	1991	The Abyss	Best Writing	Nominated	
Saturn Awards	1992	Terminator 2: Judgment Day	Best Director	Won	
Saturn Awards	1992	Terminator 2: Judgment Day	Best Writing	Nominated	
Saturn Awards	1995	True Lies	Best Director	Won	
Saturn Awards	1996	Strange Days	Best Writing (Note: shared with Jay Cocks)	Nominated	
Saturn Awards	1998	—N/a	President's Memorial Award	Won	
Saturn Awards	2003	—N/a	Donald A. Reed Award	Won	
Saturn Awards	2010	Avatar	Best Director	Won	
Saturn Awards	2010	Avatar	Best Writing	Won	
Saturn Awards	2010	—N/a	Visionary Award	Won	
Saturn Awards	2024	Avatar: The Way of Water	Best Director	Won	
Saturn Awards	2024	Avatar: The Way of Water	Best Writing	Won	
Saturn Awards	2024	Avatar: The Way of Water	Best Editing	Nominated	
Saturn Awards	2026	Avatar: Fire and Ash	Best Director	Won	
Saturn Awards	2026	Avatar: Fire and Ash	Best Writing (Note: shared with Rick Jaffa and Amanda Silver, Josh Friedman and Shane Salerno)	Won	
Saturn Awards	2026	Avatar: Fire and Ash	Best Editing (Note: shared with Nicolas De Toth, Jason Gaudio, John Refoua and Stephen Rivkin)	Nominated	
Scream Awards	2010	Avatar	Best Director	Won	
Society of Texas Film Critics Awards	1997	Titanic	Best Director	Runner-up	
Southeastern Film Critics Association Awards	1997	Titanic	Best Director	Runner-up	
Toronto Film Critics Association Awards	1998	Titanic	Best Director	Runner-up	
Venice Film Festival Awards	2010	Avatar	Persol 3-D Award for Best Stereoscopic Film	Won (Note: tied with Chris Sanders and Dean DeBlois for How to Train Your Dragon)	
Visual Effects Society Awards	2010	—N/a	Lifetime Achievement	Won	
Writers Guild of America Awards	1998	Titanic	Best Original Screenplay	Nominated	
Writers Guild of America Awards	2010	Avatar	Best Original Screenplay	Nominated	
Writers Guild of America Awards	2026	—N/a	Laurel Award for Screenwriting Achievement	Won	
