= Avoided Deforestation Partners =

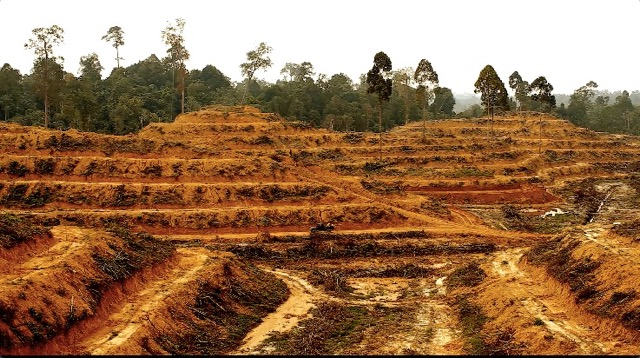
Deforested lands in Sumatra, Indonesia, being prepared for large scale palm oil development. Globally, deforestation accounts for almost 20% of the earths annual carbon emissions.

Avoided Deforestation Partners, or AD Partners, is a non-profit organization under the auspices of the Center for International Policy in Washington, D.C. AD Partners is involved in the global effort to solve climate change by working to end deforestation in tropical rainforest countries. By avoiding the practice of deforestation, i.e., clearing forests to provide inexpensive farmland (also known as "slash-and-burn agriculture"), potential carbon emissions are prevented. In addition, avoiding deforestation also allows forests to sequester carbon and scrub the air of pollutants. Beyond protecting the Earth's air quality, tropical forests facilitate conditions for rain, replenish water sources, provide habitats for myriad plant and animal species, and sustain the livelihoods of 1.6 billion people globally. Leading scientists and economists say that ending deforestation is the most cost effective and scalable method of reducing greenhouse gases. In fact, they believe that ending deforestation will cut the timeframe for solving the climate crisis in half.

AD Partners' focus is advocacy for U.S. and international forest protection policies. A large part of their efforts go toward convening global leaders from government, civil society and the business world at the international United National Climate summits, also known as the UNFCCC COP meetings.

Most recently, AD Partners has joined television and movie climate change projects to help raise awareness about the critical link between climate change and the massive deforestation that continues to occur in rainforest countries such as Brazil and Indonesia. For most of the world, the link between preventing deforestation and solving the climate crisis is still underappreciated.

== Media Projects ==
=== Emmy Award-Winning Showtime Series "Years of Living Dangerously," Seasons 1 and 2 ===
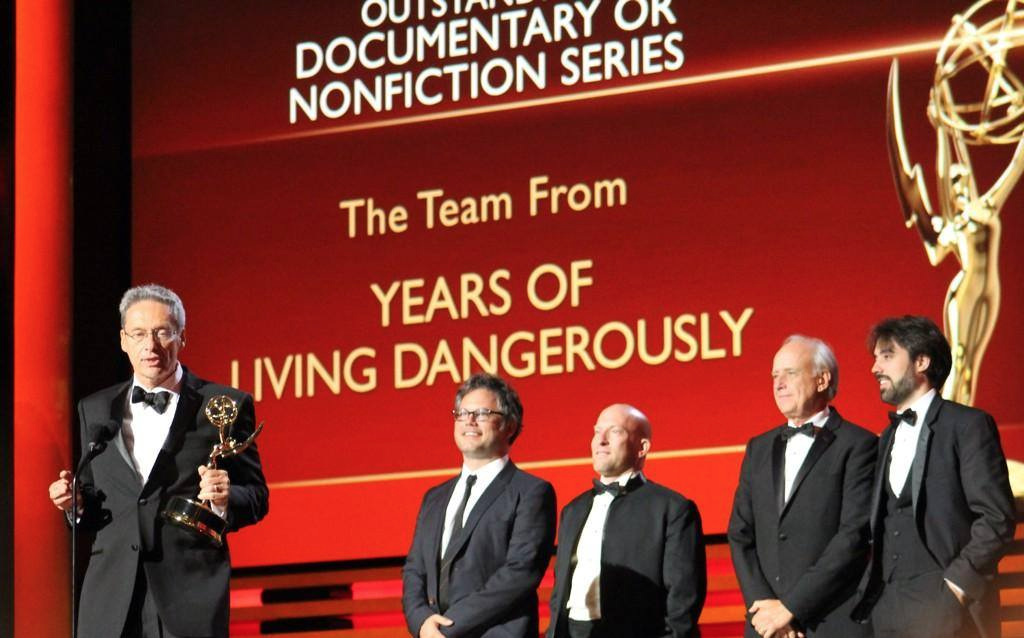
AD Partners founder Jeff Horowitz on stage at the Nokia Theater in LA, with Executive Producer David Gelber and other senior members of the "Years of Living Dangerously" team to accept Emmy award.

To broaden its audience base for their message about the important connection between deforestation and climate change, Jeff Horowitz joined the Showtime docu-series, Years of Living Dangerously as the co-producer of the first two episodes related to deforestation. Horowitz secured the participation of actor/conservationist Harrison Ford as the story's correspondent. The executive producers for this landmark Showtime climate change series were James Cameron, Jerry Weintraub, and former governor Arnold Schwarzenegger, along with Emmy Award-winning former 60 Minutes producers Joel Bach and David Gelber, and climate expert Daniel Abbasi. Dr. Joseph Romm (ClimateProgress.org) served as the chief science advisor. The nine-episode series aired in Spring 2014. The show won the 2014 Emmy Award for Outstanding Documentary or Best Nonfiction Series. In addition to recognizing the show's executive producers, the Emmy also acknowledges the work of co-executive producer Solly Granatstein, supervising producer Jennifer Latham, senior producer Adam Bolt, and producer Jacob Kornbluth.

Years of Living Dangerously "takes a compellingly fresh approach to showing the importance of climate hazards to human affairs...and – perhaps most important – revealing the roots of the polarizing divisions in society over this issue." Years is "constructed like a newsmagazine" and "each episode weaves together several reports, some done by journalists like Lesley Stahl or Chris Hayes, but most by a roster of celebrities that includes Mr. Ford, Don Cheadle, Matt Damon, Olivia Munn, Jessica Alba and Arnold Schwarzenegger." Other celebrity-correspondents include: Mark Bittman, America Ferrera, Thomas Friedman, Michael C. Hall, Chris Hayes, M. Sanjayan and Ian Somerhalder.

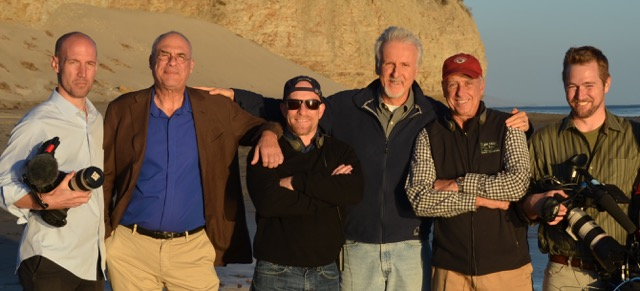
"Years of Living Dangerously" crew with Executive Producer Jim Cameron.

For the deforestation segment, Jeff Horowitz worked with actor Harrison Ford as the story's correspondent. Mr. Ford, also an environmentalist, currently serves as the vice-chair of Conservation International's board. Mr. Ford's interview with Indonesia's Forestry Minister about the state of the forests in Tesso Nilo National Park continues to resonate.

In addition to advising the executive producers on an episode that highlights problems of and solutions to deforestation, for the Indonesia segment, AD Partners secured interviews with key governmental officials and civil society personnel. Carrying the story back to the U.S., AD Partners developed the narrative about the ways in which sophisticated monitoring techniques can be used to track the culprits of deforestation. For this piece, AD Partners obtained permission to film at both NASA Ames Research Center and Google Earth, and to interview key scientists engaged in democratizing access to forest monitoring satellite data. AD Partners also put together a segment on how current agricultural practices – particularly those involved in the production of pulp and paper, cattle ranching, soy and palm oil – are largely responsible for widespread global deforestation, and how a group of manufacturers and retailers is leading the transformation of agricultural supply chains, and thereby creating a market for sustainable, deforestation-free goods. Season Two was broadcast by National Geographic in Fall 2016. Horowitz again collaborated with the Years Project as a co-executive producer and storytelling consultant for episodes about deforestation and climate change. The story for Season Two focused on the continued deforestation in the Brazilian rainforest. Titled "The Battle in the Forest," the episode features celebrity correspondent Gisele Bündchen as she travels to her home country to "see the extent of the damage and investigates what's being done to save the [Brazilian] rainforest for all of us." Ms. Bündchen's work for the docu-series builds on her work as Goodwill Ambassador for the United Nations Environment Programme, as founder of Projeto Agua Limpa (Clean Water Project), and her participation in many other campaigns to raise awareness for environmental causes.

=== "Time to Choose," a climate change documentary by Oscar-winning director-producer Charles Ferguson ===
Horowitz served as executive producer for Academy Award-winning director-producer Charles Ferguson's third documentary, "Time to Choose." The film "explores the comprehensive scope of the climate change crisis and examines the power of solutions already available." "Time to Choose" debuted online on Huffington Post and in Paris during the international climate talks in 2015. The climate change solutions film is scheduled for global release in June 2016. In addition to serving as executive producer, Horowitz's efforts on the project led to the inclusion in the film of a number of rainforest advocates, including renowned primatologist and UN Messenger of Peace, Dr. Jane Goodall, DBE; the United National head of international climate negotiations (UNFCCC Secretary) Christiana Figueres; Unilever CEO Paul Polman; head of Indonesia's president's Delivery Unit for Development, Monitoring and Oversight Kuntoro Mangkusubroto; primatologist and Conservation International President Russell Mittermeier; California Governor Jerry Brown; and other important voices.

=== "Stop the Burning," a short film about the importance of protecting forests, narrated by Dr. Jane Goodall, DBE ===
Horowitz directed and produced "Stop the Burning," a short film based on interviews he conducted with 30 global leaders at the World Economic Forum in Davos, Switzerland, in 2015. The 30 voices in "Stop the Burning" — from government, civil society and business – offer a collective message: deforestation must stop immediately if we are to protect our planet from the grim realities of climate change. Narrated by Dr. Jane Goodall, the film debuted on Huffington Post and at the 2015 climate talks in Paris at the Grand Palais and other venues. "Stop the Burning" was also featured on Upworthy as part of their series in support of the climate talks.

The short narrative film features, in order of appearance, the following forest advocates:
Andrew Steer, president and CEO, World Resources Institute
Kevin Rudd, former prime minister of Australia
Marco Lambertini, director general, WWF International
Jeffrey Sachs, director, The Earth Institute, Columbia University
Robert Orr, assistant secretary-general, United Nations
Inger Andersen, director general, IUCN
Winnie Byanyima, executive director, Oxfam International
Abdon Nababan, secretary general, Indigenous Peoples Groups, Indonesia
Paul Polman, CEO, Unilever
David Maclennan, CEO, Cargill
Mary Robinson, former president of Ireland, UN Envoy For Climate Change
Justin Mundy, director, HRH Prince Charles' Rainforest Project
Felipe Calderón, former president of Mexico
Fred Krupp, president, Environmental Defense Fund
Helen Clark, former prime minister of New Zealand, administrator, UNDP
Johan Rockström, executive director, Stockholm Resilience Center
Paul Bulcke, CEO, Nestlé, S.A.
Laurence Tubiana, ambassador for Climate Change, Govt. of France
Soren Schroder, CEO, Bunge Limited
Peter Bakker, president, World Bus. Council For Sustainable Development
Christiana Figueres, executive secretary, UNFCCC
Naoko Ishii, CEO and chair, Global Environment Facility
Jeremy Oppenheim, director, McKinsey and Company
Mark Tercek, president and CEO, The Nature Conservancy
Rachel Kyte, VP, special envoy, Climate Change Group, World Bank
Lord Nicholas Stern, chair, Grantham Institute, London School Of Economics
Erik Solheim, former minister of environment, Norway
Shinta Kamdani, vice chair, Indonesia Chamber of Commerce
Steve Howard, chief sustainability officer, Ikea
Richard Branson, chair, Virgin United

== Jeff Horowitz, founder, Avoided Deforestation Partners ==
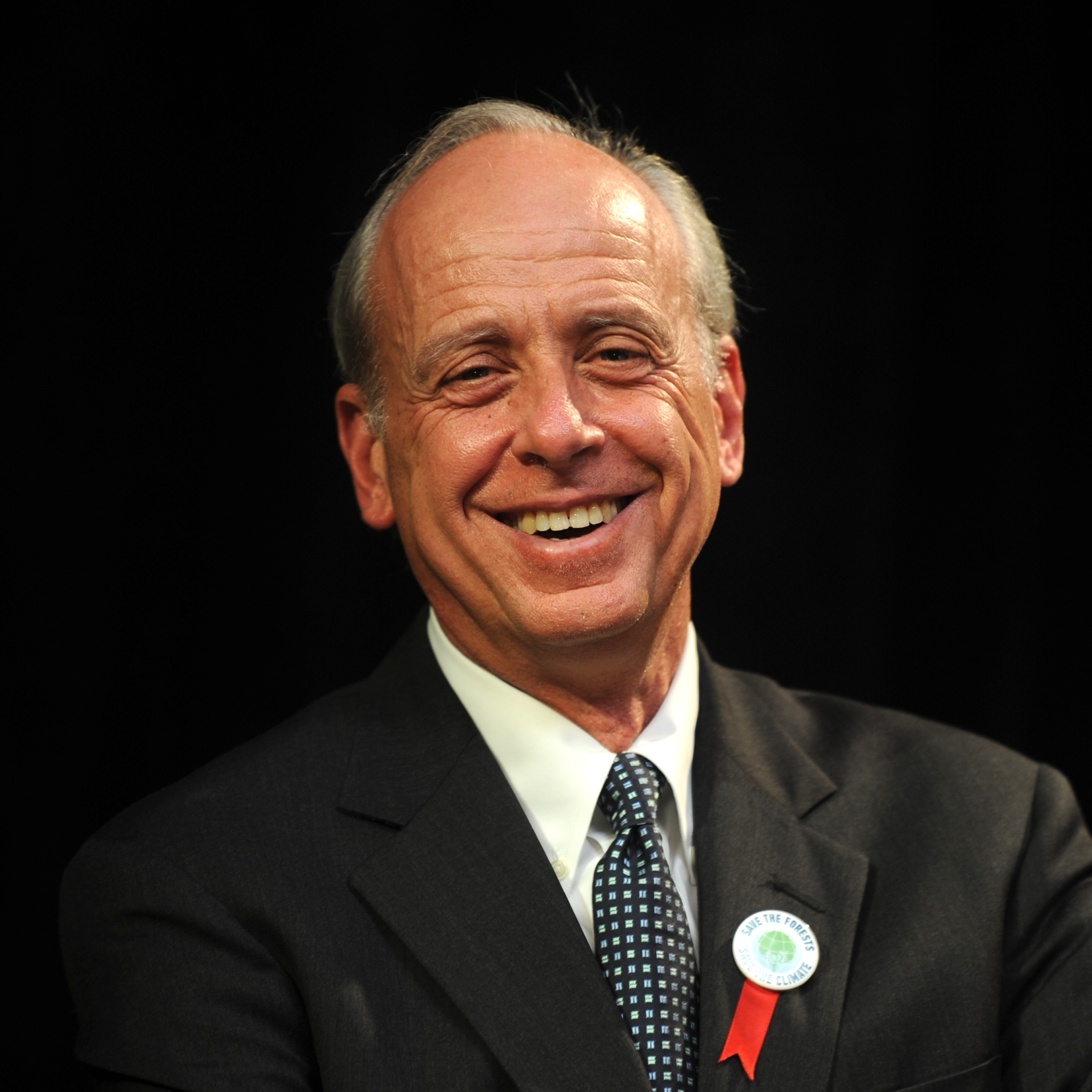
Jeff Horowitz, founder of Avoided Deforestation Partners

The organization's founder, Jeff Horowitz, began the organization by bringing together leaders from government, the private sector and civil society to advance practical, scalable solutions to protect tropical forests. His philosophy is that big environmental solutions can be achieved by forging alliances among groups that are not always accustomed to working together. His first successful application of this approach was during 2008–09, when Horowitz convinced a significant number of environmental NGOs, corporate representatives, and U.S. Government agencies to participate in developing a common approach to ending deforestation. Many viewed this strategy as the only way significant forest protection provisions would be inserted into the Waxman-Markey climate bill, now known as the American Clean Energy and Security Act. Horowitz's work lead to the inclusion of a suite of provisions that carried an estimated annual value of US$15 billion for reducing international deforestation. Businessweek and Politico reported that Horowitz played a key role during the drafting of U.S. Climate legislation to protect the rain forests, and helped to build consensus among a diverse group of players in the debate. Horowitz continues to serve as a facilitator across both for- and non-profit sectors for major environmental consensus-driven strategies for protecting international forests (and thereby the climate).

In his role AD Partners' founder, Horowitz is frequently called upon to participate in high level international climate change discussions. At the 2015 climate talks in Paris, he served as moderator for an "Earth to Paris" panel, which featured Drs. Jane Goodall and Sylvia Earle. In 2014, he was invited by the IUCN to attend their World Parks Congress and served as moderator for their panel, "World Leaders' Dialogues: The Future Is Not What It Used To Be – how parks can help build a more resilient future." Panel members included Paula Caballero, Senior Director, Environment and Natural Resources Management Global Practice, The World Bank Group; Sally Jewel, secretary of Interior, United States of America; President Tommy Esang Remengesau Jr., the eighth president of the Republic of Palau; Margareta Wahlström, secretary-general, United Nations Office for Disaster Risk Reduction; and Zhang Xinsheng, president of International Union for Conservation of Nature, executive chairman of the Eco-Forum Global, and president of China Education Association for International Exchange.

Horowitz's rainforest advocacy includes media projects for mainstream media audiences, and he has written guest columns for such outlets as the Huffington Post and Mongabay.com.

== Mission ==
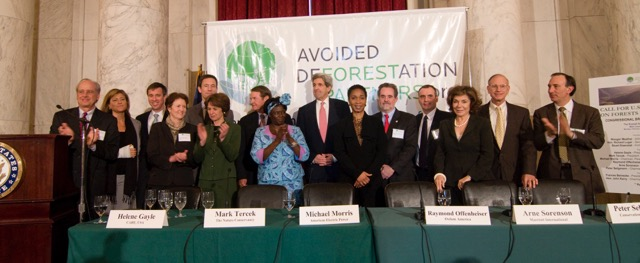
Jeff Horowitz facilitating special session in U.S. Senate hearing room, hosted by AD Partners, featuring Senator John Kerry, Nobel Peace Prize Laureate Wangari Maathai, along with civil society and business leaders.

AD Partners' mission is "dedicated to advancing U.S. and international climate and resource protection policies. In particular, the group promotes the concept of "avoided deforestation," a term coined within the context of international climate change discussions.

AD Partners brings together public, private and civil society leaders to inspire decision makers to implement strategies that promote sustainable agriculture that is free of deforestation." To this end, AD Partners has convened international events that support United Nations efforts such as REDD+ (Reducing Emissions from Deforestation and Forest Degradation) and the Green Climate Fund (see subhead: Support for International Forest Protection). In addition, the organization has developed partnerships between industry and government that promote resource conservation and the significant reduction of deforestation via sustainable agricultural practices.

AD Partners has supported initiatives that monetize forests' carbon storage capacity, thereby providing carbon credits that governments and industry can buy to offset their emissions. This initiative essentially pays developing countries to protect and effectively manage their forests. The effort is intended to counter the lucrative practice of clearing rainforests in such countries as Brazil and Indonesia so that the land can be used for cattle grazing, planting soy, oil palm and other high-demand crops. However, some critics suggest that this top-down forest management approach does not adequately address the needs of communities on the ground.

== Founder of The Tropical Forest Alliance: a public-private partnership to end tropical deforestation ==
Since 2011, AD Partners has been working with the Consumer Goods Forum (CGF), a consortium of some of the largest retailers and manufacturers in the world. CGF members include Unilever, Procter & Gamble, General Mills, Coca-Cola, Walmart, and Kraft Foods; all told, CGF companies represent $3.1 trillion in annual sales. AD Partners has been working alongside the CGF to help facilitate their ambitious pledge to achieve zero net deforestation by 2020. By mid-2012, AD Partners had brokered a partnership between the Consumer Goods Forum and the U.S. Government that would offer support to their deforestation-free sustainable supply chain initiatives. This partnership was announced by Ambassador Don Steinberg, USAID Deputy Administrator, during the AD Partners' Rio+20 event on June 21, 2012. Event co-chairs Dr.Jane Goodall, DBE, and Sir Richard Branson also voiced their support for this initiative. Elsewhere at the Rio+20 conference, U.S. Secretary of State Hillary Clinton noted that the U.S. "is working with...the Consumer Goods Forum to combat deforestation through sustainable supply chains."

Along with the public-private partnership formed by the U.S. Government as a result of the AD Partners Rio+20 meeting, the non-governmental organization, the Tropical Forest Alliance 2020 (TFA2020) was founded. The TFA2020's goal is to mobilize key private sector, governmental and civil society entities to help achieve zero net deforestation in tropical forest countries by 2020. The Consumer Goods Forum is a key member of this group.

== Building Support for International Forest Protection ==
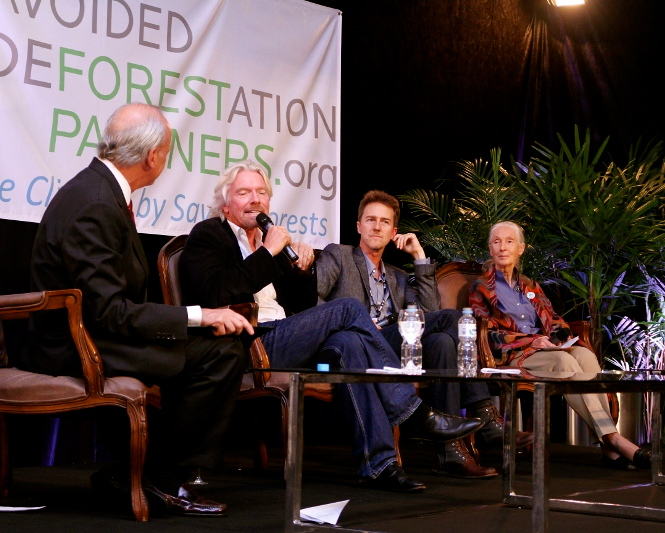
Jeff Horowitz (far left) moderated this panel of distinguished environmentalists: Sir Richard Branson, actor/conservationist Edward Norton, and Dr. Jane Goodall, DBE

AD Partners advocates for global forest protection policies, such as REDD+, and convenes high level international events to demonstrate support and momentum for such policies during important conferences such as the United Nations Framework Convention on Climate Change (UNFCCC) Conference of the Parties (COP) and on Capitol Hill in the U.S. AD Partners events are used to advance forest protection strategies and as forums for special announcements that highlight key government and industry initiatives. For example, at the AD Partners' event during COP15 in Copenhagen, U.S. Secretary of Agriculture Tom Vilsack announced the U.S.'s pledge of $1 billion, which encouraged five other nations to commit monies to REDD start-up funds, bringing the total available to $3.5 billion. Other speakers at the COP15 event included president of Guyana Bharrat Jagdeo, World Bank President Robert Zoellick, UNDP head Helen Clark (former Prime Minister of New Zealand), Governor Eduardo Braga (Amazonas State, Brazil), Sir Richard Branson, Prime Minister of Norway Jens Stoltenberg, and Dr. Jane Goodall, DBE, as well as the heads of IUCN, WWF-US, NRDC, EDF, TNC, CI, and high level executives from American Electric Power and Duke Energy.

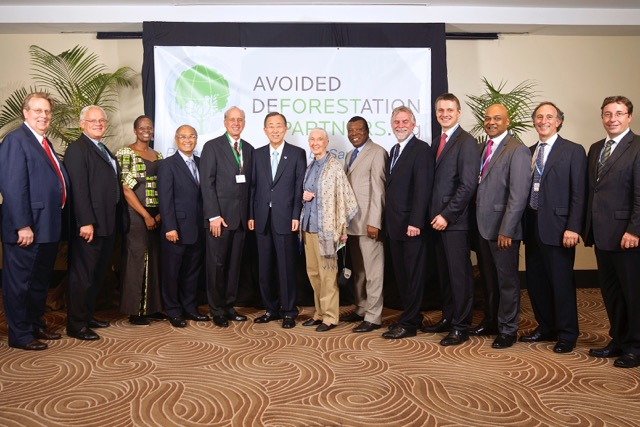
At the 2012 UN sponsored international climate change gathering in South Africa, AD Partners hosted the high-level forest protection discussions, featuring UN Secretary General Ban Ki-Moon and many other distinguished Government, NGO and business leaders.

In 2010, during COP16 in Cancún, Mexico, United Nations Secretary General Ban Ki-moon was the keynote speaker at the AD Partners event. The Secretary General offered his support for the REDD+ initiative then being discussed in the negotiations. Walmart's chairman of the board, Rob Walton, announced his company's commitment to use only sustainably-sourced palm oil in the manufacturing of its private label products by 2015. Other event highlights included comments by Norway's Prime Minister Jens Stoltenberg, who announced progress in his country's large-scale funding of forest-protection projects in Brazil and Indonesia.

For COP17 in Durban, the AD Partners event featured a tribute to the late Nobel Peace Prize Laureate Wangari Maathai. Event highlights included a keynote speech by UN Secretary General Ban Ki Moon, video messages from U.S. President Barack Obama, former U.S. President Bill Clinton, and U.S. Secretary of State Hillary Rodham Clinton, who each communicated wholehearted support for the protection of international rainforests. Liberia's President Ellen Johnson Sirleaf (who also won the Nobel Peace Prize that year) spoke through her foreign minister, Dr. Toga Gayewea McIntosh, and emphasized the urgent need for the Parties to embrace the Green Climate Fund as a critically important opportunity to help countries like Liberia meet the real challenges Africa is facing due to climate change.

== U.S. Climate Legislation ==
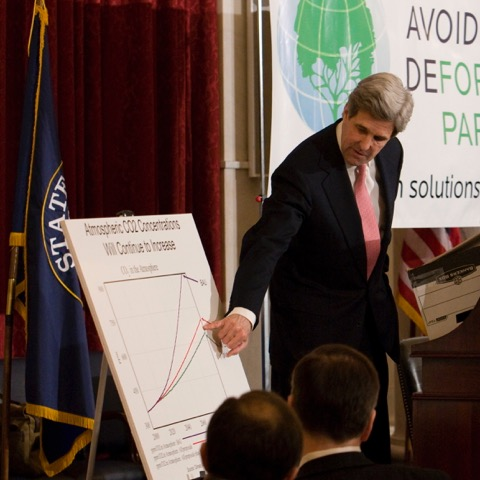
Senator Kerry offering data on climate change to AD Partners audience in an effort to promote a Senate Bill to protect our climate and the world's forests.

The American Clean Energy and Security Act passed by the House of Representatives in June 2009 set a goal of conserving the carbon trapped in forests equal to 10% of U.S. emissions, and in doing so, set aside 5% of total emissions allowance value from carbon auctions, which could bring $3–5 billion a year, to the protection of forests in developing nations. The forest provisions of the so-called Waxman-Markey bill are informed by the 14 principles which comprise the "Tropical Forest and Climate Unity Agreement," a consensus document forged by AD Partners. The Senate's Kerry-Lieberman bill had the same broad goal for conserving forests but devoted no specific funds to stopping deforestation.

== Tropical Forest and Climate Unity Agreement ==
In May 2009, groups including the Sierra Club, the Natural Resources Defense Council, Duke Energy and American Electric Power signed the "Tropical Forest and Climate Unity Agreement," a set of 14 specific principles endorsing market and non-market mechanisms to protect tropical forests as part of U.S. climate policy. The agreement, signed by groups who are typically at odds with one another, was facilitated by Horowitz. Signatories include: American Electric Power, Marriott International, Mercy Corps, National Wildlife Federation, Natural Resources Defense Council, NorthWestern Energy, Ohio Corn Growers Association, PG&E Corporation, Republicans for Environmental Protection, Starbucks Coffee Company, The Walt Disney Company, Union of Concerned Scientists, and Virgin Group. There are some indications (though they are not yet confirmed) that this agreement has become guidepost for the U.S. Government's forest-climate policy.

== Origins ==
AD Partners was founded in 2007 by a small group of forest protection activists headed by Jeff Horowitz and Dr. Charlotte Streck. As the organization evolved, Horowitz became the driving force behind its initiatives, and of the partnership it forged among an international coalition of businesses and non-profit organizations.

AD Partners is an informal network of individuals who donate their time and resources to advancing U.S. and international climate and energy policies along with business solutions that include robust incentives to protect tropical forests. AD Partners convenes public and private sector leaders to inspire decision makers to implement strategies that reduce deforestation.

In addition to the founder, Jeff Horowitz, AD Partners is led by its executive director, Margaret Dick, Ph.D. Ms. Dick is responsible for communications strategy, international event coordination and implementation, and research projects. She has extensive experience in public relations and corporate communications. She holds a Ph.D. in rhetoric and communication from Purdue University and is co-author of Communication and Social Understanding (2009).
