= Joel Bach =

American journalist, film and television producer (born 1970)

- Born: 1970 (age 55–56)
- Education: Brown University
- Occupations: Journalist, film and television producer
- Years active: 1991–present
- Known for: 60 Minutes; Years of Living Dangerously
- Notable work: Years of Living Dangerously, co-creator, with David Gelber
- Awards: Emmy Awards; Environmental Media Award
- Website: theyearsproject.com

Joel Bach (born 1970) is an American journalist, film and television producer, known for his work on 60 Minutes with CBS News and for co-founding the environmental project, Years of Living Dangerously with David Gelber. He won two Emmy Awards for his work on 60 Minutes, and shared with David Gelber both a Primetime Emmy Award and an Environmental Media Award for Years of Living Dangerously.

Bach worked at 60 Minutes with correspondents including Ed Bradley, Lesley Stahl, Steve Kroft, and Scott Pelley. He successfully recruited film director James Cameron as an executive producer of Years of Living Dangerously, and enlisted actors to the project including Harrison Ford, Jessica Alba, Matt Damon, and Arnold Schwarzenegger.

== Early life and education ==
Bach spent his early life in Colorado. He was raised near the Roaring Fork River in Colorado, which would later inspire the name for his joint production company with Gelber. Bach studied video and film production at Brown University. Bach fostered his early interests in the environment and combined these motivations with his burgeoning film skills at Brown. He created the short film, Brown Is Green, intended to educate first year students at Brown on why they should recycle. The piece also served as his honors thesis. Bach graduated from Brown University in 1991.

== Journalism career ==
=== ABC and NBC ===
Before landing at 60 Minutes with CBS News, Bach had worked at American Broadcasting Company (ABC) and National Broadcasting Company (NBC). In addition, he gained filmmaking experience through directing public service announcements, short films, and music videos. He worked out of San Francisco and Los Angeles, producing advertisements released domestically within the United States.

=== 60 Minutes ===
Bach and Gelber had previously worked together on 60 Minutes with CBS News, prior to co-founding the Years of Living Dangerously project. Bach joined 60 Minutes in 2004. He spent seven years as a producer and journalist with 60 Minutes. While working at 60 Minutes, Bach earned two Emmy Awards for his investigative journalism and production efforts with CBS News. During his time at CBS News, Bach primarily worked with 60 Minutes journalists including Ed Bradley, Lesley Stahl, Steve Kroft, and Scott Pelley.

During their lunch breaks together at 60 Minutes, Bach and Gelber shared their mutual wishes to subsequently work on a project dedicated to educating people about the environment. After Bach and Gelber had collaborated on two separate stories related to climate change for 60 Minutes, they realized it was the most crucial news topic worthy of additional stories. They both felt they had not seen enough coverage of the topic at 60 Minutes. They knew they wanted to focus more on the topic, but were cognizant of the fact that they could not simply inform their supervisors at 60 Minutes that they would intend to only focus on one solitary news issue of climate change.

Bach began to attempt to produce as many news pieces related to climate change for 60 Minutes as he could. He and Gelber discussed the topic of global warming and agreed it was not getting enough significant attention from the media. Bach and Gelber both left 60 Minutes together in order to devote more time and energy to their climate change project. Together in 2011 they founded the company to focus these efforts, Roaring Fork Films — in the process Bach described they both left, "the best job in TV, 60 Minutes."

=== Years of Living Dangerously ===
In 2011, Bach and Gelber received their first funding source for the Years of Living Dangerously project, with a check for US$750,000 from investor Jeremy Grantham. Microsoft co-founder, Paul Allen, used his company Vulcan Inc. to allocate $1.8 million towards education and marketing related to the project. In total, Bach and Gelber were able to raise $15 million in funds for the project. They initially wanted the Years of Living Dangerously project to be a feature film. Fellow film and television executive Jerry Weintraub convinced Bach and Gelber to instead make the production into a television series. Their idea for the project was motivated further by Bach and Gelber's experience watching the 2012 United States presidential debates, and he noticed there were no questions on climate change.

After Bach and Gelber successfully enlisted Weintraub and film director James Cameron as executive producers of the television documentary project, multiple celebrities joined soon thereafter — including Harrison Ford, Jessica Alba, Matt Damon, and Arnold Schwarzenegger. They were joined by news reporters Lesley Stahl and Chris Hayes. David Nevins, president of entertainment at Showtime Networks, explained why they decided to move forward with the project in 2012. Nevins stated it presented Showtime with a rare chance to utilize both celebrity star talent and filmmakers such as James Cameron, "with the hard-hitting, intimate journalism of 60 Minutes veterans Joel Bach and David Gelber."

The series debuted on Showtime in 2014. The project received a generally positive media reception. Columbia Journalism Review noted the show "drew praise", while The Guardian observed, "the series has very high standards of accuracy." Bach and Gelber's work garnered Years of Living Dangerously the 2014 Emmy Award, for Outstanding Documentary or Nonfiction Series. He and Gelber also won the 2014 Environmental Media Award in the category, Outstanding Achievement for Environmental Content.

Season two of Years of Living Dangerously was subsequently picked up by the National Geographic channel. For season two of the series, Bach reached out to David Letterman after discovering he showed specific attention to climate change issues on his CBS program Late Show with David Letterman. Bach explained how he landed Letterman for Years of Living Dangerously, "He seemed to perk up when this issue came across his lap We reached out to him to see if he’d want to be part of this, and he said, ‘Absolutely.’ He said [that climate change is] something he does think about a lot." Bach and Gelber sent David Letterman to India for the second season, to interview the country's prime minister Narendra Modi about energy issues.

For their second season, Bach and Gelber continued to use celebrity star power to bring attention to climate change, and additionally provided more examples of solutions and direct methods on how interested parties can address the issue. Their work on the second season of Years of Living Dangerously was again recognized by the Environmental Media Awards, with another nomination for Outstanding Achievement for Environmental Content.

== Filmography ==
Year	Title	Role	Notes
2004–2011	60 Minutes on CBS News	Producer	Won two Emmy Awards.
2014–2016	Years of Living Dangerously	Co-Creator with David Gelber	Won a Primetime Emmy Award and an Environmental Media Award.
2020	X Marks the Spot	Producer	Written by Jacob Kornbluth, narrated by Sigourney Weaver

== Awards and honors ==
Year	Recognized work	Award / honor	Organization	Result	Ref.
2008	60 Minutes, "Left Behind"	Emmy Award, Outstanding Coverage of a Breaking News Story in a News Magazine	Academy of Television Arts & Sciences	Nominated	
2009	60 Minutes, "The Bailout"	Emmy Award, Outstanding Coverage of a Breaking News Story in a News Magazine	Academy of Television Arts & Sciences	Won	
2009	60 Minutes, "Where's the Bottom?"	Emmy Award, Outstanding Interpretation or Analysis of a Business News Story - News Magazines	Academy of Television Arts & Sciences	Won	
2010	60 Minutes, "60 Billion Dollar Fraud"	Emmy Award, Outstanding Investigative Journalism in a News Magazine	Academy of Television Arts & Sciences	Nominated	
2014	Years of Living Dangerously	Primetime Emmy Award, Outstanding Documentary or Nonfiction Series	Academy of Television Arts & Sciences	Won	
2014	Years of Living Dangerously	Environmental Media Award: The EMA Outstanding Achievement for Environmental Content Award	Environmental Media Association	Won	
2014	Years of Living Dangerously	IDA Award, Best Limited Series	International Documentary Association	Nominated	
2015	Years of Living Dangerously	Cinema for Peace Award: The International Green Film Award 2015	Cinema for Peace Foundation	Nominated	
2017	Years of Living Dangerously	Environmental Media Award: The EMA Outstanding Achievement for Environmental Content Award	Environmental Media Association	Nominated	

== See also ==
- Avoided Deforestation Partners
- List of awards and nominations received by James Cameron
- Primetime Emmy Award for Outstanding Documentary or Nonfiction Series
