= Nature Is Speaking =

Environmental awareness campaign

Nature Is Speaking is an ongoing environmental awareness campaign by Conservation International that was launched in 2014. The campaign is developed by TBWA\Media Arts Lab and produced by RadicalMedia for Conservation International. It was conceptualized by Peter Seligmann and Lee Clow and its launch was led by M. Sanjayan.

== Concept ==
Each short film of the campaign personifies a different environmental aspect, such as the ocean, with its own celebrity narrator. The campaign is intended to raise awareness that nature is required in order for humans to survive. Each film ends with the slogan: "Nature doesn't need people. People need nature."

== Languages ==
As of 2023, the campaign has been released in 11 different languages: English, Mandarin, Portuguese, Filipino, Spanish, Cantonese, Indonesian, German, French, Dutch and Arabic.

Language	Title	Debut air date	Year	Episodes	Overall
English	Nature Is Speaking	October 6, 2014	2014	8	14
English	Nature Is Speaking	October 6, 2014	2015	2	14
English	Nature Is Speaking	October 6, 2014	2016	2	14
English	Nature Is Speaking	October 6, 2014	2018	1	14
English	Nature Is Speaking	October 6, 2014	2021	1	14
Spanish	La Naturaleza Nos Habla	October 6, 2014; September 21, 2017	2014	1	9
Spanish	La Naturaleza Nos Habla	October 6, 2014; September 21, 2017	2017	6	9
Spanish	La Naturaleza Nos Habla	October 6, 2014; September 21, 2017	2020	1	9
Spanish	La Naturaleza Nos Habla	October 6, 2014; September 21, 2017	2023	1	9
Dutch	Nature Is Speaking	March 26, 2015	2015	1	1
Mandarin	大自然在说话	April 8, 2015	2015	7	13
Mandarin	大自然在说话	April 8, 2015	2016	6	13
Cantonese	大自然在說話	May 6, 2015	2015	2	5
Cantonese	大自然在說話	May 6, 2015	2016	3	5
Portuguese	A Natureza Está Falando	August 12, 2015	2015	7	13
Portuguese	A Natureza Está Falando	August 12, 2015	2016	5	13
Portuguese	A Natureza Está Falando	August 12, 2015	2023	1	13
Indonesian	Alam Berbicara	November 5, 2015	2015	4	4
German	Die Natur Spricht	November 30, 2015	2015	2	4
German	Die Natur Spricht	November 30, 2015	2016	1	4
German	Die Natur Spricht	November 30, 2015	2022	1	4
French	La Nature Parle	December 4, 2015	2015	3	4
French	La Nature Parle	December 4, 2015	2021	1	4
Filipino	Nature Is Speaking	October 7, 2016	2016	9	9
Arabic	Nature Is Speaking	November 16, 2016	2016	1	1

== Films ==
No.	Original title	Original voice actor	Original language	Year	Versions	Ref.
1	Mother Nature	Julia Roberts	English	2014	9	
2	The Ocean	Harrison Ford	English	2014	6	
3	The Rainforest	Kevin Spacey	English	2014	6	
4	The Soil	Edward Norton	English	2014	6	
5	Water / Agua	Penélope Cruz	English / Spanish	2014	7	
6	The Redwood	Robert Redford	English	2014	2	
7	Coral Reef	Ian Somerhalder	English	2014	6	
8	Flower	Lupita Nyong'o	English	2014	5	
9	Ice	Liam Neeson	English	2015	4	
10	Home / La Maison	Reese Witherspoon / Marion Cotillard	English / French	2015	8	
11	Mountain	Lee Pace	English	2016	5	
12	Sky / 天空	Joan Chen	English / Mandarin	2016	4	
13	A Amazônia	Camila Pitanga	Portuguese	2016	4	
14	El Páramo	Carlos Vives	Spanish	2017	1	
15	Forest	Shailene Woodley	English	2018	1	
16	The Wave	Jason Momoa	English	2021	3	

=== Mother Nature ===
Language	Title	Voice actor	Release date	Ref.
English	Mother Nature	Julia Roberts	October 6, 2014	
Dutch	Moeder Natuur	Halina Reijn	March 26, 2015	
Mandarin	大自然母亲 (Daziran Muqin)	Jiang Wenli	April 8, 2015	
Portuguese	A Mãe Natureza	Maria Bethânia	August 13, 2015	
Indonesian	Ibu Pertiwi	Christine Hakim	November 6, 2015	
German	Mutter Natur	Hannelore Elsner	November 30, 2015	
French	Mère Nature	Sophie Marceau	December 4, 2015	
Filipino	Inang Kalikasan	Lea Salonga	October 7, 2016	
Spanish	Madre Naturaleza	Salma Hayek	September 21, 2017	

=== The Ocean ===
Language	Title	Voice actor	Release date	Ref.
English	The Ocean	Harrison Ford	October 6, 2014	
Mandarin	海洋 (Haiyang)	Jiang Wen	April 15, 2015	
Portuguese	O Oceano	Rodrigo Santoro	2015	
Indonesian	Samudra	Lukman Sardi	2015	
German	Der Ozean	Hannes Jaenicke	2015	
Filipino	Karagatan	John Lloyd Cruz	2016	

=== The Rainforest ===
Language	Title	Voice actor	Release date	Ref.
English	The Rainforest	Kevin Spacey	October 6, 2014	
Mandarin	雨林 (Yulin)	Ge You	April 22, 2015	
Indonesian	Hutan Tropis	Pandji Pragiwaksono	2015	
Portuguese	A Floresta	Pedro Bial	2015	
French	La Forêt Tropicale	Nicolas Hulot	2015	
Filipino	Kagubatan	Noel Cabangon	2016	

=== The Soil ===
Language	Title	Voice actor	Release date	Ref.
English	The Soil	Edward Norton	October 6, 2014	
Mandarin	土地 (Tudi)	Chen Jianbin	April 29, 2015	
Portuguese	O Solo	Gilberto Gil	2015	
Filipino	Lupa	Robert Arevalo	2016	
German	Der Boden	Oliver Mommsen	November 17, 2016	
Spanish	El Suelo	Juan Fernando Velasco	2017	

=== Water ===
Language	Title	Voice actor	Release date	Ref.
English	Water	Penélope Cruz	October 6, 2014	
Spanish	Agua / El Agua	Penélope Cruz	October 6, 2014; September 21, 2017	
Mandarin	水 (Shui)	Zhou Xun	May 6, 2015	
Cantonese	水 (Seoi)	Zhou Xun	May 6, 2015	
Portuguese	A Água	Maitê Proença	September 2, 2015	
Indonesian	Air	Najwa Shihab	November 13, 2015	
Filipino	Tubig	Cris Villonco	October 7, 2016	

=== The Redwood ===
Language	Title	Voice actors	Release date	Ref.
English	The Redwood	Robert Redford & Lena Redford	October 6, 2014	
Mandarin	红木 (Hongmu)	Pu Cunxin & Zhang Jiadi	2015	

=== Coral Reef ===
Language	Title	Voice actor	Release date	Ref.
English	Coral Reef	Ian Somerhalder	October 27, 2014	
Portuguese	O Recife de Coral	Max Fercondini	October 14, 2015	
Cantonese	珊瑚礁 (Saan-wu Ziu)	Donnie Yen	2015	
Mandarin	珊瑚礁 (Shanhu Jiao)	Donnie Yen	2015	
Filipino	Bahura	Piolo Pascual	2016	
Spanish	El Arrecife de Coral	Rubén Blades	2017	

=== Flower ===
Language	Title	Voice actor	Release date	Ref.
English	Flower	Lupita Nyong'o	December 1, 2014	
Cantonese	花 (Faa)	Tang Wei	2015	
Mandarin	花 (Hua)	Tang Wei	2015	
Portuguese	A Flor	Juliana Paes	2015	
Filipino	Bulaklak	Angel Aquino	2016	

=== Ice ===
Language	Title	Voice actor	Release date	Ref.
English	Ice	Liam Neeson	November 12, 2015	
Mandarin	冰 (Bing)	Tony Leung Chiu-wai	April 20, 2016	
Cantonese	冰 (Ping)	Tony Leung Chiu-wai	2016	
Portuguese	O Gelo	Zeca Camargo	2017	

=== Home / Earth ===
Language	Title	Voice actor	Release date	Ref.
English	Home	Reese Witherspoon	December 10, 2015	
French	La Maison	Marion Cotillard	December 10, 2015	
Mandarin	家园 (Jiayuan)	Sylvia Chang	April 27, 2016	
Cantonese	家 (Gaa)	Sylvia Chang	April 27, 2016	
Filipino	Tahanan	Jaclyn Jose	October 7, 2016	
Portuguese	O Lar	Vanessa Lóes	October 17, 2016	
Arabic	Home	Asma Lmnawar	November 16, 2016	
German	Erde	Marie Nasemann	June 28, 2022	

=== Mountain ===
Language	Title	Voice actor	Release date	Ref.
English	Mountain	Lee Pace	March 15, 2016	
Mandarin	山 (Shan)	Feng Xiaogang	May 18, 2016	
Filipino	Bundok	Robert Seña	2016	
Portuguese	A Montanha	Thiago Lacerda	2016	
Spanish	La Montaña	Fonseca	2017	

=== Sky ===
Language	Title	Voice actor	Release date	Ref.
English	Sky	Joan Chen	April 18, 2016	
Mandarin	天空 (Tiankong)	Joan Chen	May 11, 2016	
Portuguese	O Céu	Lenine	2016	
Spanish	El Cielo	Eugenio Derbez	2017	

=== The Amazon ===
Language	Title	Voice actor	Release date	Ref.
Portuguese	A Amazônia	Camila Pitanga	August 27, 2016	
Mandarin	亚马逊 (Yamaxun)	Jin Dong	November 17, 2016	
Spanish	Amazonía	Catalina García	September 3, 2020	
French	L'Amazonie	Mélanie Laurent	November 6, 2021	

=== The Páramo ===
Language	Title	Voice actor	Release date	Ref.
Spanish	El Páramo	Carlos Vives	September 21, 2017	

=== Forest ===
Language	Title	Voice actor	Release date	Ref.
English	Forest	Shailene Woodley	October 4, 2018	

=== The Wave ===
Language	Title	Voice actor	Release date	Ref.
English	The Wave	Jason Momoa	June 17, 2021	
Spanish	La Ola	Sofía Mulánovich	June 8, 2023	
Portuguese	A Onda	Carlos Burle	June 24, 2023	

== Voice Actors ==
Title	Language										
Title	English	Dutch	Mandarin	Cantonese	Portuguese	Indonesian	German	French	Filipino	Arabic	Spanish
Mother Nature	2014; Julia Roberts	2015; Halina Reijn	2015; Jiang Wenli		2015; Maria Bethânia	2015; Christine Hakim	2015; Hannelore Elsner	2015; Sophie Marceau	2016; Lea Salonga		2017; Salma Hayek
The Ocean	2014; Harrison Ford		2015; Jiang Wen		2015; Rodrigo Santoro	2015; Lukman Sardi	2015; Hannes Jaenicke		2016; John Lloyd Cruz		
The Rainforest	2014; Kevin Spacey		2015; Ge You		2015; Pedro Bial	2015; Pandji Pragiwaksono		2015; Nicolas Hulot	2016; Noel Cabangon		
The Soil	2014; Edward Norton		2015; Chen Jianbin		2015; Gilberto Gil		2016; Oliver Mommsen		2016; Robert Arevalo		2017; Juan Fernando Velasco
Water	2014; Penélope Cruz		2015; Zhou Xun	2015; Zhou Xun	2015; Maitê Proença	2015; Najwa Shihab			2016; Cris Villonco		2014; Penélope Cruz
The Redwood	2014; Robert Redford		2015; Pu Cunxin								
Coral Reef	2014; Ian Somerhalder		2015; Donnie Yen	2015; Donnie Yen	2015; Max Fercondini				2016; Piolo Pascual		2017; Rubén Blades
Flower	2014; Lupita Nyong'o		2015; Tang Wei	2015; Tang Wei	2015; Juliana Paes				2016; Angel Aquino		
Ice	2015; Liam Neeson		2016; Tony Leung	2016; Tony Leung	2016; Zeca Camargo						
Home / Earth	2015; Reese Witherspoon		2016; Sylvia Chang	2016; Sylvia Chang	2016; Vanessa Lóes		2022; Marie Nasemann	2015; Marion Cotillard	2016; Jaclyn Jose	2016; Asma Lmnawar	
Mountain	2016; Lee Pace		2016; Feng Xiaogang		2016; Thiago Lacerda				2016; Robert Sena		2017; Fonseca
Sky	2016; Joan Chen		2016; Joan Chen		2016; Lenine						2017; Eugenio Derbez
The Amazon			2016; Jin Dong		2016; Camila Pitanga			2021; Mélanie Laurent			2020; Catalina García
The Paramo											2017; Carlos Vives
Forest	2018; Shailene Woodley										
The Wave	2021; Jason Momoa				2023; Carlos Burle						2023; Sofía Mulánovich
