= M. Sanjayan =

American conservation scientist

- Sanjayan Muttulingam
- Born: Sri Lanka
- Education: University of Oregon (B.S., M.S.) University of California, Santa Cruz (Ph.D)
- Organization(s): Conservation International, National Geographic Society, Aspen Institute
- Known for: Conservation science, science communication, endangered species
- Television: Emmy-nominated (2013)

M. Sanjayan is an American conservation scientist, writer and television news contributor, specializing in the role of nature in preserving and enhancing human life. He is referred to as Sanjayan, using one name as is sometimes Tamil custom. He was the chief executive officer at Conservation International, a global conservation organization working to protect the nature people around the world rely on for food, freshwater, and livelihoods.

His scientific work has been published in peer-reviewed journals Science, Nature and Conservation Biology and his expertise has received extensive media coverage, including Vanity Fair, Outside, Time, Men's Journal, The New York Times, The Atlantic, and "CBS This Morning".

In 2023, Sanjayan was named to the inaugural TIME100 Climate list, recognizing the 100 most innovative leaders driving business climate action.

A leading science communicator and television presenter, Sanjayan has hosted and co-hosted a range of documentaries for PBS, BBC and Discovery. In 2023, he hosted the multi-part PBS documentary, Changing Planet. In 2017, he host the University of California and Vox Media’s “Climate Lab” series. In the summer of 2015, Sanjayan co-hosted "Big Blue Live," PBS's and BBC's three-part television event showcasing marine life on the Pacific Coast, which was the first live prime time natural history show on American television and won the BAFTA for Live Event. He also hosted the 2015 PBS and National Geographic television series "EARTH - A New Wild," which was filmed in over 24 countries, and was a contributor on Showtime's Emmy-winning series on climate change, "Years of Living Dangerously." He has appeared on numerous other programs, including "The Today Show" and "The Late Show with David Letterman," and was named to Men's Journal's list of the "50 Most Adventurous Men" in 2015. He was also featured in a profile in The Economist's Intelligent Life in 2015, and is a co-editor of the book Connectivity Conservation.

Sanjayan also co-led the launch of Nature Is Speaking, Conservation International's award-winning campaign that features Julia Roberts, Harrison Ford, Liam Neeson and Penelope Cruz, among others, and delivers the message that people need nature to survive.

In May 2012, CBS News named Sanjayan its science and environmental contributor and his 2013 CBS Evening News report on elephant poaching was nominated for an Emmy in the investigative journalism category. National Geographic Society recently selected Sanjayan for its Explorers Council, a distinguished group of top scientists, researchers, and explorers who provide advice and counsel to the Society across disciplines and projects. Sanjayan is also a Catto fellow at the Aspen Institute.

Born in Sri Lanka, Sanjayan and his family moved to Sierra Leone in 1972. He moved to the United States to study at the University of Oregon, where he received both a B.S. in biology and a M.S. in ecology. In 1997, he earned a PhD in ecology and evolutionary biology from the University of California, Santa Cruz. He is a visiting researcher at UCLA and a distinguished professor of practice at Arizona State University. He won the 2015 UCSC Alumni Achievement Award and the 2015 UCSC Global Oceans Hero Award. Sanjayan is a Disneynature Ambassador and a member of National Geographic Society’s Explorers Council.

Prior to Conservation International, Sanjayan was lead scientist at The Nature Conservancy.
