= Years of Living Dangerously =

American documentary television series

Program titlecard

Years of Living Dangerously is an American documentary television series, spread over two seasons, focusing on climate change. The first season, consisting of nine episodes, was broadcast on Showtime in 2014. The second season, consisting of eight episodes, was broadcast on the National Geographic Channel in 2016. Executive producers included James Cameron, Arnold Schwarzenegger, and series creators Joel Bach and David Gelber (formerly of 60 Minutes). Joseph Romm and Heidi Cullen were the chief science advisors. The series won an Emmy Award for Outstanding Documentary or Nonfiction Series.

The weekly episodes featured celebrity hosts with a history of environmental activism and well-known journalists with a background in environmental reportage. These "correspondents" traveled throughout the United States and globally to interview experts and ordinary people affected by, and seeking solutions to, the effects of climate change. The hosts served as reporters and proxies for the audience, asking questions to find out people's opinions and discover the scientific evidence. The final episode of season one featured an interview of President Barack Obama.

Episodes explored the effects of rising sea levels, historic droughts and flooding, water scarcity, ocean acidification, deforestation and the rapidly increasing extinction rate of species, but also focused on "solutions that individuals, communities, companies and even governments can use to address worldwide climate change", including cheaper solar and wind energy, advancing battery technology and electric cars. Hosts included Cameron, Schwarzenegger, Harrison Ford, Ian Somerhalder, America Ferrera, David Letterman, Gisele Bündchen, Jack Black, Matt Damon, Jessica Alba, Sigourney Weaver, and various other actors and journalists.

Schwarzenegger reflected on how the series tries to make the issue of climate change resonate with the public: "I think the environmental movement only can be successful if we are simple and clear and make it a human story. We will tell human stories in this project. The scientists would never get the kind of attention that someone in show business gets." Cameron elaborated: "We didn’t use our celebrities as talking head experts, because they’re not climate experts. They were concerned, intelligent, curious citizens who were out to find answers. They were functioning as journalists." Newsweek said that the celebrity hosts "lend sparks to an issue that sends most viewers for the exits".

== Episodes ==
=== Season 1 (2014) ===
No. overall	No. in season	Title	Original release date
1	1	"Dry Season"	April 13, 2014
Don Cheadle reports on the severe droughts in the Southwest United States, following scientist and devout Christian, Katharine Hayhoe, as she speaks to religious audiences about the connection between extreme weather and climate change; Harrison Ford visits Indonesia to learn how slash-and-burn deforestation, driven by the global appetite for products like palm oil and paper, contributes a large portion of the world's carbon emissions; and Thomas Friedman investigates how drought contributed to the civil war in Syria. The UK organization Global Witness stated that although Ford's segment exposed the dangers of deforestation, executive producer Arnold Schwarzenegger owned an approximately 5% stake in Dimensional Fund Advisors, a firm that it said finances many of the world's largest logging companies.
2	2	"End of the Woods"	April 20, 2014
Schwarzenegger accompanies the "hot shots", elite firefighters in Western US forests, as they risk their lives fighting the fire season made longer and more destructive by climate change, as fire regions expand from the southwest US further north into Canada. He learns that even more destruction is caused by the proliferation of bark beetles, as longer summers enable them to reproduce up to twice each year and kill trees with their toxic secretions. Meanwhile, Ford continues his quest to stop Indonesian deforestation and the carbon emissions and displacement of animals and people that it causes, confronting officials including Indonesia's forestry minister, Zulkifli Hasan, and its president, whom he persuades, with the help of the TV cameras, to take "real action". He also gets sustainability commitments from officers of Unilever, a major user of palm oil. We also see how Greenpeace and other environmental groups are making a real and positive difference.
3	3	"The Surge"	April 27, 2014
Chris Hayes reports on how Superstorm Sandy affected towns and families; he meets with congressman Michael Grimm from New Jersey, initially a climate skeptic, who changes his position on climate change after reviewing the science and the work of fellow-Republican Bob Inglis. M. Sanjayan interviews scientists around the world about climate change and reviews the data that they are collecting about the effects of climate change around the world, for example at Christmas Island, where El Niños begin.
4	4	"Ice & Brimstone"	May 4, 2014
Ian Somerhalder follows Anna Jane Joyner, the daughter of prominent Evangelical preacher, Rick Joyner, as she works to persuade congregations and preachers in North Carolina (including her skeptical father) to join the Evangelical fight against climate change and the Beyond Coal campaign to shut down a coal-fired power plant. They meet with Inglis, gulf coast workers, Hayhoe and former skeptical scientist Richard A. Muller, all of whom provide Rick with information about impacts of climate change. Anna asked her father for his support in an open letter in the Huffington Post, writing: "We are the first generation that knows how serious the stakes are, as well as the last to be able to do something about it in time. Lesley Stahl visits Greenland to investigate the effects of climate change in the Arctic on global sea levels and the rush to develop oil and gas reserves there. Greenland's ice is melting five times faster than it was 20 years ago, but businesses hope to gain trillions of dollars by exploiting the arctic. Scientist Heidi Cullen explains that "if we don’t leave 30 percent of our oil and gas reserves untapped, large parts of our planet will become unlivable." Stahl meets with U.S. Secretary of State John Kerry, who has called climate change "perhaps the world's most fearsome weapon of mass destruction". Kerry says that, to make meaningful progress, "the people need to demand that our elected officials take responsible action to craft a real energy policy."
5	5	"True Colors"	May 12, 2014
Olivia Munn learns about ocean acidification and the proposed West Coast coal export terminals that would nearly double US coal exports. She follows the governor of the State of Washington, Jay Inslee, as he makes the fight against climate change a top priority in his first year in office, using his executive powers when necessary to get around Republican climate-change skeptics in the state legislature. Inslee "urged the media to be more aggressive in covering climate threats since we face 'civilizational suicide' if we fail to act." Columnist Mark Bittman of The New York Times follows up on the post-Hurricane Sandy rebuilding story, the global rise in sea level, and what is being done to better prepare the East coast for storms and surges. He examines the Dutch system of flood management and concludes that, in New Jersey, rebuilding so close to the ocean is environmentally and financially unsustainable. Governor Chris Christie refuses "to acknowledge the role that climate change played in amplifying the impacts" of Sandy. Christie pulled New Jersey out of RGGI after meeting with the Koch brothers, who then funded campaign advertising for Christie.
6	6	"Winds of Change"	May 19, 2014
America Ferrera reports on how public policy has supported the growth of wind and solar power in Kansas, and how oil and gas companies, with lobbyists and allies like the Heartland Institute and the American Legislative Exchange Council (ALEC) oppose these policies. Meanwhile, Bittman discovers that extracting natural gas through fracking delays our transition to renewable energy and that fracking wells leak a large amount of methane, a powerful greenhouse gas, which makes fracked natural gas as dirty as, or dirtier than, burning coal.
7	7	"Revolt, Rebuild, Renew"	May 26, 2014
Jessica Alba follows Climate Corps fellows as they work to help US companies save money and improve profits through energy efficiency and sustainability management. Friedman studies how the effect of climate change on the US wheat crop (and that of other exporting nations) caused a spike in wheat prices in the Middle East, helping to provoke the Arab Spring. He learns that "Earth could warm by more than 9 degrees F (5 degrees C) by 2100 if we don’t aggressively reduce our emissions of greenhouse gases", and that more frequent heat waves and droughts will contribute to food shortages, which can lead to greater conflicts in the Middle East and elsewhere. Hayes explores the economy of another area stricken by Hurricane Sandy, Far Rockaway, Queens, discovering that the most economically vulnerable people have been the most severely affected, losing their jobs because of lack of transportation, or having to move away altogether. He concludes that New York and other cities are unprepared for the effects of climate change on their poorest citizens.
8	8	"A Dangerous Future"	June 2, 2014
Michael C. Hall travels to Bangladesh to see how climate change will impact workers and the poor in developing countries in the coming decades, when a projected 150 million people will be forced to leave their homes to escape sea level rise and increased drought, insect-borne disease and flooding. In low-lying, flood-prone, densely populated Bangladesh, sea level rise and the lengthening of the monsoon season, both caused by climate change, have already caused a migration of coastal people to Dhaka and other cities, and across the border into India, because they have lost their homes or livelihoods. These factors are projected to lead to the displacement of 20 million of Bangladeshis by 2100, who are often forced to take dangerous work. Hall argues that since the US has contributed the largest portion of the emissions already in the atmosphere, it bears responsibility for the climate change impacts in poorer nations. Matt Damon explores the public health emergencies around the nation and world caused by more frequent, intense, and longer heat waves, which kill more Americans than hurricanes, floods, tornadoes, earthquakes and lightning combined and cause health problems associated with dehydration, such as premature birth. Friedman continues his Middle East investigation in Yemen, where the scarcity of water is already leading to local fighting. He speaks with President Abd Rabbuh Mansur Hadi. Friedman concludes that where climate change leads to more frequent droughts, it is a factor that will increasingly push volatile political situations towards war.
9	9	"Moving a Mountain"	June 9, 2014
Hall concludes his journey to Bangladesh, where rising seas are expected to submerge 17% of the country. He learns that climate change is a human rights, public health and foreign policy issue. Sanjayan questions top climate scientists in their fields who collect data from the past, such as ice core samples, that explain how our climate is changing. Friedman interviews President Barack Obama on climate change and finds that climate can change so fast that it can wipe out a civilization and that "action taken to curb greenhouse emissions could have a measurable, helpful impact." Obama echoes this, saying "there's a lot we can do" about climate change. Obama notes that, as a father, he is deeply concerned but optimistic that, with persistence, America can make progress on battling climate change and can become a leader on the issue. Obama acknowledges that, to avoid the worst effects of climate change, we must leave some fossil fuels unexploited. He tells Friedman that "you've got to recognize [that climate change] is going to be one of the most significant long-term challenges, if not the most significant long-term challenge, that this country faces and that the planet faces. ... when [the effects of climate change] start multiplying, then people start thinking ... 'We're going to reward politicians who talk to us honestly and seriously about this problem.'""

=== Season 2 (2016) ===
No. overall	No. in season	Title	Original release date
10	1	"A Race Against Time"	October 30, 2016
This episode focuses on renewable energy sources, especially solar. David Letterman travels to India to investigate the populous country's efforts to expand its inadequate electrical grid, as its economy booms, and to supply electricity for the first time to 300 million citizens. He finds that there the country will double the amount of dirty coal that it burns unless it can receive assistance in transitioning quickly to solar and other renewable technologies. He interviews Prime Minister Narendra Modi, travels to rural villages where few can afford power and explores the US potential in bringing renewable energy to India. In Florida and Nevada, Cecily Strong finds former officials and other insiders in the two sunny states who reveal how utility companies and politics are blocking the growth of solar energy and clean energy jobs in the US.
11	2	"Gathering Storm"	November 2, 2016
Jack Black explores how Miami and other low-lying coastal areas can survive rising sea-levels caused by climate change. Although the political and business community is largely in denial, and many locals are unaware of the cause of the increasing flooding, he finds a few legislators, residents, activists and scientists racing to solve the problem before disaster strikes. Ian Somerhalder travels to the Bahamas where he looks at historical evidence and explores a blue hole, diving and taking core samples of the ocean floor with scientists from Woods Hole Oceanographic Institution to learn how the warming of the oceans' surface will increase the strength and destructiveness of hurricanes and superstorms.
12	3	"The Uprooted"	November 9, 2016
In Africa, Thomas Friedman finds an increasing population of refugees fleeing wars, rising sea-levels, desertification and hurricanes, as up to 1 billion people are expected to become climate refugees over the next century. Young men left without the prospect of farming are more likely to join extremist groups. Don Cheadle explores how governor Jerry Brown is fighting both climate change and the historic California drought. James S. Famiglietti, the Jet Propulsion Laboratory Senior Water Scientist, shows Cheadle the danger of a global water and food crisis as viewed from NASA satellites, and he describes the problems that climate change is causing for farm families as groundwater depletion threatens their crop production.
13	4	"Fueling the Fire"	November 16, 2016
Arnold Schwarzenegger explores how the military is adapting to climate change and limiting national security risk by increasing energy efficiency and using renewables, but needs to increase the pace of this adaptation. In Kuwait, he sees how fuel convoys are responsible for most US soldier deaths. He finds how our armed forces are dealing with an increased number of climate-related military conflicts and natural disasters. Cattle ranching, drought, deforestation, massive hydroelectric dams and illegal mining threaten the Amazon rain forest, which is losing 2 million acres a year to clearing. The degradation of the Amazon accounts for 15 percent of global greenhouse gas emissions, more than half of which is caused by clearing forests for cattle ranching. Native Brazilian Gisele Bündchen tours the extent of the damage and joins the national environmental police as they fight to end illegal deforestation. She meets indigenous people and activists trying to protect the forest and flies over the Amazon to view huge patches of deforested and burnt land, logs piled high on trucks and barges, drought-stricken fields and vast cattle ranches that were once lush, thousand-year-old tropical rain forests. She learns that if Americans shifted to more plant-based foods, it would make a big impact in the fight against climate change.
14	5	"Collapse of the Oceans"	November 23, 2016
At the Great Barrier Reef in Australia, Joshua Jackson investigates the devastating impacts of ocean warming on coral reefs and looks at the predicted impact on ocean ecosystems, and on our own food supply, of ocean acidification. He travels to the Philippines, whose citizens rely heavily on healthy reefs for food and other ocean products and for protection from storms. He finds that fishermen are no longer able to sustain their families because of the increasing scarcity of fish.
15	6	"Priceless"	November 30, 2016
Nikki Reed looks at the best single solution for climate change: putting a price on carbon. This would accelerate the adoption of clean energy, reduce harmful emissions and the cost of climate-related disasters and could stimulate the economy. She joins college student activists, who confront their college president, and interviews the mayor of Vancouver, where carbon pricing has been a success. In a Kenyan wildlife preserve, Aasif Mandvi explores the threat that climate change poses to endangered species. He meets conservationists who explain how drought is compounding poaching and loss of habitat, leading to accelerating species loss. He learns that the disappearance of one species can have negative consequences on the whole ecosystem.
16	7	"Safe Passage"	December 7, 2016
Ty Burrell looks into the progress of electric vehicles (EVs) and automated vehicles (AVs), that can greatly reduce carbon emissions from the transportation sector. He speaks with Silicon Valley's technology innovators and travels to Atlanta, Georgia, where generous and successful EV incentives were recently repealed, to meet with activists. He also visits a Los Angeles EV car show to hear from buyers, dealers and experts. In Washington, DC, Bradley Whitford looks at the progress of activists and Citizens' Climate Lobby volunteers like Jay Butera, who are working to persuade Republican legislators to join bipartisan efforts to act on climate change.
17	8	"Uprising"	December 14, 2016
Burning coal remains a major source of energy, emitting toxic pollutants and carbon dioxide. North of Chicago, in Waukegan, Illinois, America Ferrera meets with activists, backed by the Sierra Club's Beyond Coal campaign, who are working to shut down a local coal plant, and with a mayor who wants to keep it open. Residents complain that the pollution is making them sick. Ferrera learns about an option that can provide clean energy, green jobs and scenic development of the lakefront. Pollution from energy plants is choking the air in many Chinese cities, and the middle class there has joined with activists to pressure the government to clean up the environment. Sigourney Weaver investigates China's impact on today's global environment, and the progress it is making to reduce emissions even as its economy grows. China is investing more money in clean energy than any other country in the world.

== Distribution and schedule ==
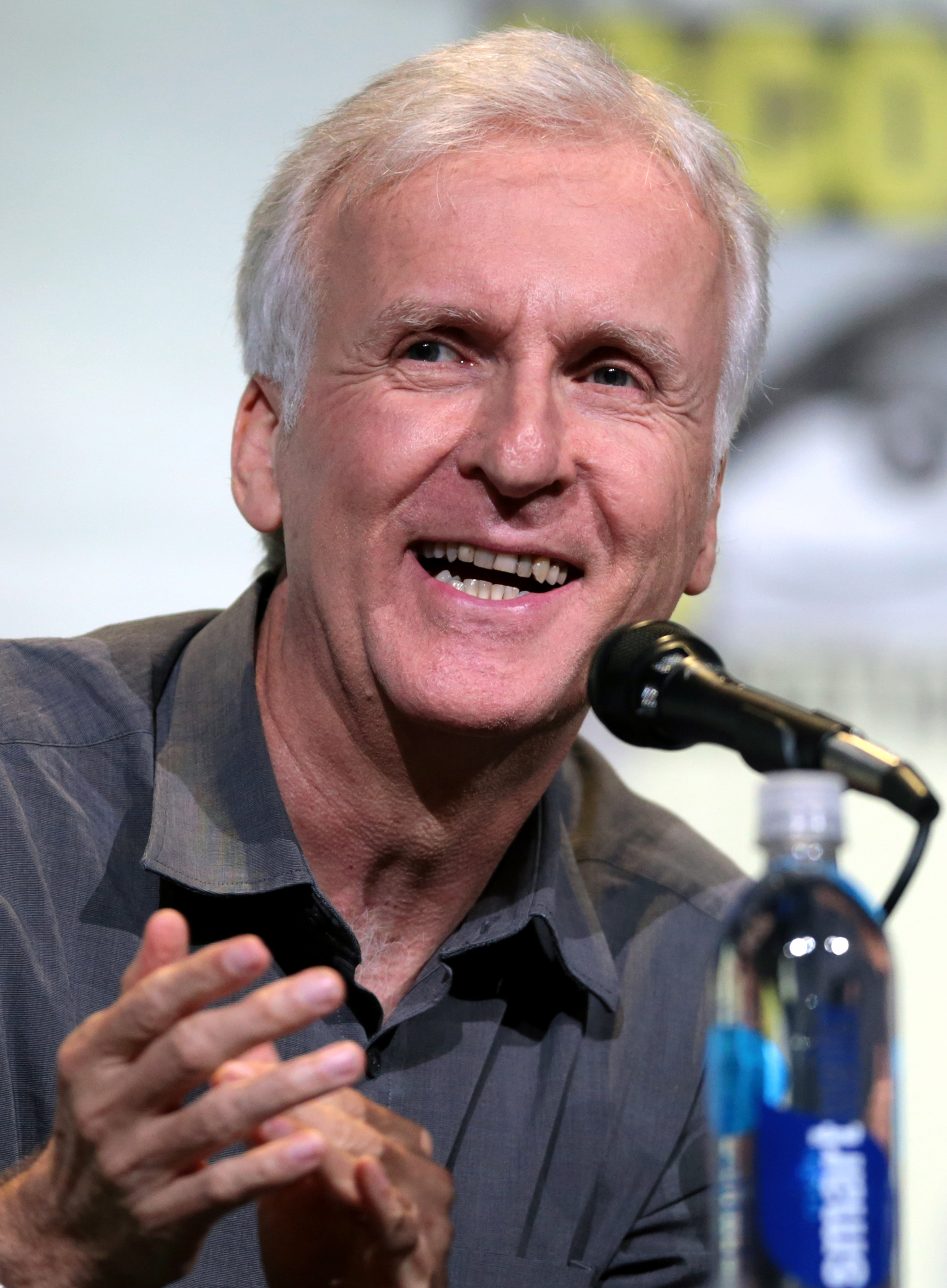
Executive producer James Cameron

The show premiered on Showtime on April 13, 2014. Episode 1 was made available freely on the internet on April 7, 2014, prior to its television debut. The following episodes aired on April 20 and 27, May 4, 12, 19 and 26, and June 2. Showtime re-aired the entire series in September 2014. Electus International acquired international rights to season one of the series and licensed it to broadcasters in over 75 countries and regions. Season one of the series is available on DVD and other digital platforms. In 2014, the National Wildlife Federation edited the series one episodes to create curricula for schools and colleges

Season 2 premiered on Sunday, October 30, 2016, at 8pm on National Geographic Channel (followed that evening by Before the Flood, Leonardo DiCaprio's climate documentary). The subsequent episodes of season 2 of Years of Living Dangerously aired on Wednesdays at 10 p.m. (9 p.m. Central Time), beginning on November 2. Season 2 consisted of 8 episodes, distributed in 171 countries and 45 languages. The National Geographic Channel is "available in almost 90 million U.S. homes (four times the reach of Showtime) and in over 440 million homes ... worldwide."

== Website and advocacy ==
The series producers maintain a website, https://theyearsproject.com, that contains bonus footage and further information about the stories told in the episodes. It also contains:

- information about, and links to, the science on which the episodes are based;
- an extensive "solutions" page with links to materials about what government, individuals and others can do to stop climate pollution; and
- an educators page, in partnership with the National Wildlife Federation, that links to age-appropriate resources for middle and high school teachers and students, college faculty and students, and parents.

The series' advocacy for climate action includes the #PutAPriceOnIt campaign and a satiric series of "climate inaction figures" representing public officials and private persons who oppose action on climate change.

== Reception ==
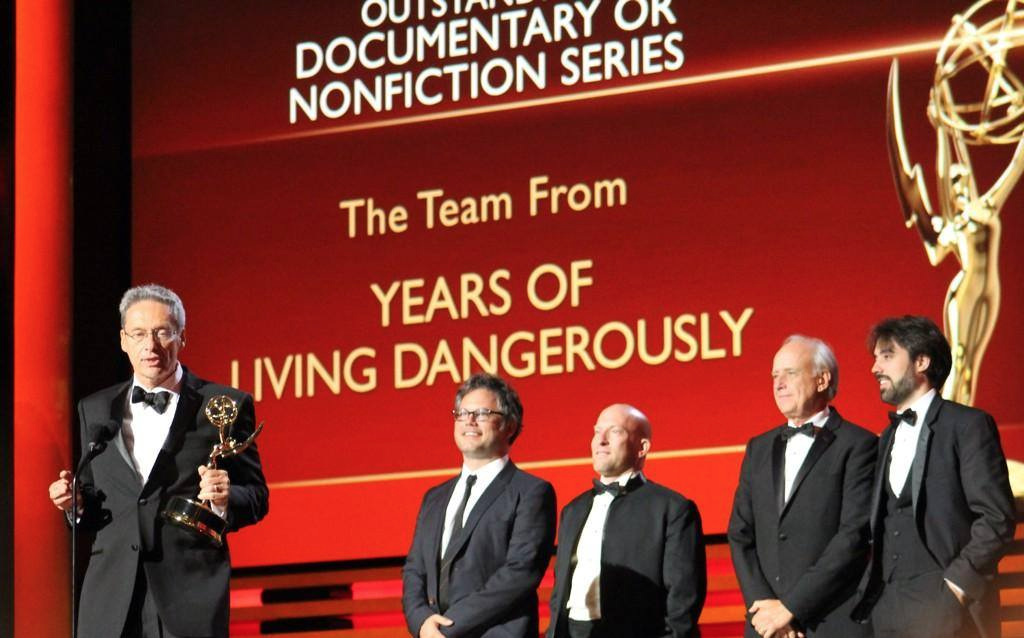
Years of Living Dangerously co-creator David Gelber accepting the Primetime Emmy Award for Outstanding Documentary or Nonfiction Series (2014)

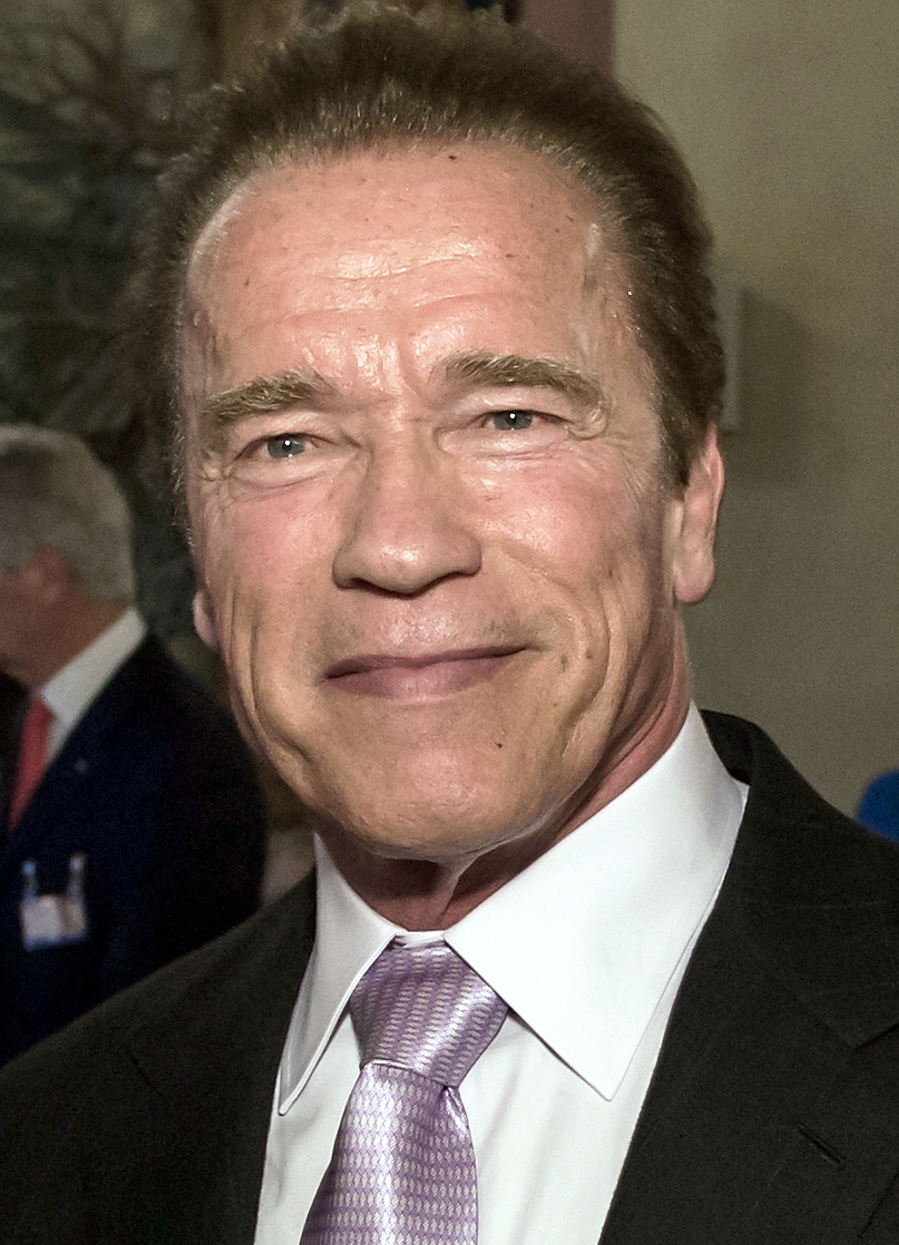
Executive producer Arnold Schwarzenegger appeared in two episodes.

=== Critical reaction ===
The first season's Metacritic score was 81. The Globe and Mail calls the series "a lavish, gripping production focused on the real effect of climate change in real people's lives around the world." The series shows what scientists do in the field "and why they’re reaching the conclusion that this problem is such a serious risk to the viability of our civilization and requires urgent action. ... [The] actors [get] their 'hands dirty'. ... [The show] may ... open new avenues for climate change communications." Skeptical Science terms the series "terrific and powerful. ... The series sets a dramatic, powerful urgent tone." Bryan Walsh of Time magazine wrote that: "it's a strong work of documentary journalism, with richly shot and compelling stories".

Andrew C. Revkin of The New York Times wrote that "the Showtime team, at least in episode one, deserves plaudits for taking a compellingly fresh approach to showing the importance of climate hazards to human affairs ... having the movie and television stars ... asking questions and driving the story through their inquiry." CleanTechnica called the series "powerful" and "compelling", observing that the "often baffling science of climate change, marked by relatively small changes that are often invisible to lay observers, is finally something the larger public can immediately understand here in the format of the finest mainstream cable television. The Sun Herald commented: "The stories are compelling, and were filmed as real news was happening around the participants. A reviewer for The Hollywood Reporter thought: "The documentary does an excellent job of being simple and clear without being arrogant, and its convergence of science, politics, religion and industry proves its ultimate point." The Guardian calls the series "perhaps the most important climate change multimedia communication endeavor in history."

After the DVD and digital release of the series, The New York Times review lamented that "many American households did not have the chance to see Years of Living Dangerously. That is a shame. ... With nine episodes running nearly an hour apiece, "Years" represents a serious time commitment. But that time will be rewarded, because this is the best American television series ever done on climate change."

=== Viewership ===
The first episode of season one had 294,000 viewers. The Sunday evening episodes of Years of Living Dangerously, from April 13 to May 4, 2014, had ratings of 0.07%, 0.04%, 0.04% and 0.04% in the adults 18–49 demographic. These figures do not include "on demand" viewers or the viewers who saw the show during Showtime's free weekend, May 9–11, 2014 Season one, episode No. 1, has been viewed more than 890,000 times on YouTube.

Cameron commented that the producers had hoped for higher ratings, but they "braced for less because historically people tend to not tune into something that's environmentally themed or climate change related. ... It's part of the whole denial process that we're all in as a society that we really have to face up to."

=== Awards and nominations ===
Year	Award	Category	Nominee(s)	Result	Ref.
2014	Primetime Emmy Awards	Outstanding Documentary or Nonfiction Series	Years of Living Dangerously (Season 1)	Won (tied with American Masters)	
2014	Primetime Emmy Awards	Outstanding Writing for Nonfiction Programming	Episode 3: "The Surge"	Nominated	
2014	Environmental Media Awards	Outstanding Achievement for Environmental Content	Years of Living Dangerously (Season 1)	Won	
2014	IDA Award	Best Limited Series	Years of Living Dangerously (Season 1)	Nominated	
2015	Cinema for Peace Award	The International Green Film Award 2015	Years of Living Dangerously (Season 1)	Nominated	
2017	Environmental Media Award	The EMA Outstanding Achievement for Environmental Content Award	Years of Living Dangerously (Season 2)	Nominated	
