= Environmental Media Awards =

Annual awards ceremony

Environmental Media Association Awards
- Awarded for: Television and film projects that effectively incorporate environmental themes
- Presented by: Environmental Media Association
- First award: September 1991; 35 years ago
- Website: green4ema.org/ema-awards

The Environmental Media Awards have been presented by the Environmental Media Association since 1991 to honor the best television episode or film with an environmental message. The Environmental Media Association (EMA) is a non-profit organization founded in 1989 with the stated belief that "through television, film and music, the entertainment community has the power to influence the environmental awareness of millions of people."

== Notable moments ==
The very first EMA Awards took place in 1991 at which Diane Sawyer was host and Robert Redford was the keynote speaker.

The 27th annual EMA awards were held in 2017 and hosted by Jaden Smith at the Barker Hangar, Santa Monica Airport.

The 29th annual EMA awards took place in 2019, hosted Karrueche Tran, with Isle of Dogs by Wes Anderson winning the award for best feature film.

In response to the COVID-19 pandemic, the 30th Environmental Media Association’s awards ceremony in 2020 was held "virtually" via a livestreamed event.

2021 saw a return to a more traditional awards event, after the previous year's pandemic induced virtual one, and was hosted by Jeff Goldblum. At that ceremony Ed Begley Jr. received a lifetime achievement award, in part as recognition of his environmental activism.

== See also ==
- Environmental journalism
- Environmentalism in film and television
- Global 500 Roll of Honour
- Global Environmental Citizen Award
- Goldman Environmental Prize
- Grantham Prize for Excellence in Reporting on the Environment
- Heroes of the Environment
- National Film Award for Best Non-Feature Environment/Conservation/Preservation Film
- Tyler Prize for Environmental Achievement
- List of environmental awards
