= Lexx =

Canadian/German science-fiction television series

- Also known as: LEXX: The Dark Zone Stories; Tales from a Parallel Universe
- Genre: Science fiction
- Created by: Paul Donovan; Lex Gigeroff; Jeffrey Hirschfield
- Starring: Brian Downey; Eva Habermann; Michael McManus; Xenia Seeberg
- Voices of: Tom Gallant; Jeffrey Hirschfield
- Composer: Marty Simon
- Countries of origin: Canada; United Kingdom; Germany
- No. of seasons: 4
- No. of episodes: 61 (list of episodes)

Production
- Executive producers: Paul Donovan; Wolfram Tichy
- Producers: Wolfram Tichy; Norman Denver
- Cinematography: Les Krizsan; Ian Bibby; David Albiston
- Running time: Season 1: 93–94 minutes Season 2–4: 45–48 minutes
- Production companies: Salter Street Films; CHUM Television; Silverlight Ltd. TiMe Film- und TV-Produktions GmbH

Original release
- Network: Global Television Network; Sci Fi Channel; Channel 5 CHUM Television's Space
- Release: April 18, 1997 – April 26, 2002

Lexx (also known as LEXX: The Dark Zone Stories and Tales from a Parallel Universe) is a science fiction television series created by Lex Gigeroff and brothers Paul and Michael Donovan. It was originally aired on April 18, 1997, on Canada's Citytv as four made-for-TV films. Beginning with season two, the format changed to a traditional TV series with each episode running 45 minutes. The series follows a group of mismatched individuals aboard the organic spacecraft Lexx as they travel through two universes and encounter planets, including a parody of Earth. The narrative includes irony, parody, and sex comedy, and explores ideas of fatalism, reincarnation, the afterlife, and the paradigm of good and evil.

The series is a Canadian and German co-production with some additional funding from Channel 5. Sci Fi Channel purchased the series from Salter Street Films and began airing episodes from seasons one and two (the former under the name Tales from a Parallel Universe) for the American audience in January 2000. Lexx was co-produced by Salter Street Films, later absorbed by Alliance Atlantis. In Canada, Lexx aired on the Alliance Atlantis-owned Showcase network. Lexx was primarily filmed in Canada and Germany, with additional filming on location in Iceland, Thailand, Namibia, Newfoundland, the United Kingdom, and the British Virgin Islands.

Lexx had very different tones throughout its run. While the original TV movies and the second season were mostly science fiction drama with dark comedy, season three was more serious and explored themes of life, death, and reincarnation. The show's final season—set on Earth in the early 2000s—took many turns into pure farce and introduced magic and other new elements. The series has garnered a cult following.

== Plot ==
The main characters of the series are the Lexx and its crew, consisting of security guard (class four) Stanley H. Tweedle; the love slave Zev (later Xev) Bellringer; the undead former assassin and last of the Brunnen-G, Kai; and the love-crazed robot head 790. Centuries prior, mankind was nearly destroyed in a war with the Insect Civilization, where both sides sought the total annihilation of the other. Although the Brunnen-G led humanity to victory, they were later enslaved by the Divine Order, a religious cult centred around His Shadow, a mystical being who seeks to enslave the two universes. It was foretold to Kai by the Time Prophet that one day his people would destroy His Shadow and the last remnants of the Insect Civilization.

The plot unfolds across a time span of over six thousand years. Kai's "death" occurs 2,008 years before the beginning of the main events of the series. For seasons 1 and 2, each episode is focused on space travel and usually one different planet. Seasons 3 and 4 have a single general location for all episodes. At the beginning of season 3, the crew spends 4,000 years in cryostasis before arriving at twin planets Fire and Water. In season 4, the Lexx reaches Earth in the early 2000s.

=== Season 1 (Tales from a Parallel Universe) ===
Kai and a small group of other Brunnen-G warriors mount a last stand against His Divine Shadow as their planet, Brunnis-2, is destroyed. In a final act of defiance, Kai crashes his ship into the control pod of His Shadow's flagship, the Foreshadow. He is killed by His Shadow, his memories are taken from him, and he is forced to serve as an undead assassin in the Divine Order.

Two thousand and eight years later, Stanley H. Tweedle is an assistant deputy backup courier for the Ostral-B heretics, a resistance group fighting against the Divine Order. After unknowingly leading His Divine Shadow to an Ostral-B outpost, resulting in its destruction, he is captured by the mercenaries Feppo and Smoor who extract information from him on the locations of other Ostral-B planets. They sell this information to the Divine Order, resulting in the deaths of billions. Stanley, subsequently captured by the Divine Order and after undergoing interrogation, is made a class-four security guard on the Cluster, the capital planet of the Divine Order and League of 20,000 Planets. After being reprimanded for insubordination and failing to turn himself in, he becomes a fugitive on the Cluster.

Zev Bellringer arrives on the Cluster as a prisoner and is sentenced to be turned into a love-slave, after failing to perform her wifely duties and assaulting her fiancé. Other prisoners, including a group of Ostral-B heretics and their leader, Thodin, are sentenced to be publicly executed. Thodin attempts to use an explosive device to free himself, but the device malfunctions and releases giant Cluster Lizards from containment, wreaking havoc across the Cluster. Thodin escapes and frees the other heretics, and reluctantly rescues the cannibal Giggerota. During Zev's transformation into a love-slave, she is attacked by a Cluster Lizard, turning her into a love-slave/Cluster Lizard hybrid. Before the brainwashing portion of the transformation begins, Zev frees herself and places the 790 droid in charge of her transformation in her place, causing the robot head to be programmed to be a love-slave. Upon seeing Zev, 790 immediately falls in love with her and pursues her as she escapes. His Shadow awakens Kai from cryostasis to protect the secret weapons laboratory.

Stanley and Zev meet up and make their way towards the secret weapons laboratory, where they find several Ostral-B heretics attempting to board a ship. They are pursued by Kai, who kills Thodin and chases the others into the ship. Inside, the heretics are attacked and killed by a Cluster Lizard. Before his death, one of the heretics releases a form of energy into Stanley.

Stanley, Zev, 790, and Giggerota reach the ship's bridge. The ship introduces itself as the Lexx, a machine–insect hybrid and "the most powerful weapon of destruction in the two universes", capable of destroying an entire planet in a single blast. The energy Stanley absorbed is revealed to be the key to the Lexx, making Stanley its captain. As Stanley instructs the Lexx to fly off the Cluster, they are cornered by Kai who throws Giggerota off the bridge. Before Kai can execute the others, he instead heads to the ship's hold to protect the Divine Predecessors who are being attacked by a Cluster Lizard. After saving them, Kai regains his memories from the brain of the Divine Predecessor who killed him, prompting him to turn against His Shadow. The Lexx is pursued and boarded by His Shadow, who attacks Kai for turning against him. Stanley and Zev distract His Shadow long enough for Kai to destroy him; his essence retreats from the ship as it travels through a portal into the Dark Zone. While traversing the portal, the Lexx's memory of His Shadow and its allegiance to him is wiped. The Lexx destroys the remnants of His Shadow's fleet that followed them through the portal. The three then begin searching the Dark Zone for a new home, away from His Shadow.

During their search, they encounter Kai's homeworld and explore it for insights into his past. Finding the planet abandoned, they are pursued by Giggerota who attempts to destroy the planet by disabling a series of towers that are keeping a dying star from becoming a supernova. The trio become separated from each other and discover the Time Prophet's prophecy of Kai destroying the insect civilization. Giggerota disables the towers, but the crew escapes aboard the Lexx without her. She and the planet are destroyed in the supernova.

After some time, the Lexx runs low on organic fuel and lands on the nearby planet of Klaagia to feed. The group discovers a group of psychotics obsessed with "pattern", a liquid made from organic material that parasites within their bodies feed on. Stan, Zev, and Kai inadvertently awaken the parasite queen, who attaches itself to the Lexx and pursues them off the planet. The Lexx fires on the planet and destroys it, using the meteors to kill the queen.

Meanwhile, Kai is running low on protoblood, which he needs to function in his undead state; protoblood can only be found on the Cluster. The group returns to the Cluster to find it abandoned, learning that the entire population of the League of 20,000 Planets was culled to feed and awaken the immense Giga Shadow, the last remaining insect. With help from a defecting priest of the Divine Order, they stall the Giga Shadow's awakening long enough for Kai to plant a baby Cluster Lizard inside of it. As the Lexx and its crew are almost destroyed, the Cluster Lizard reaches the Giga Shadow's brain and consumes it, killing the Giga Shadow. With a fresh supply of protoblood, the crew returns to the Dark Zone to search for a new home.

=== Season 2 ===
Before the Giga Shadow's destruction, the last remnant of His Shadow possessed Kai. Kai lies to the crew and states that he requires more protoblood to survive, leading them to the imprisoned supreme Bio-Vizier of the Divine Order, Mantrid and his servant. During their meeting, His Shadow transfers his essence into an insect carcass, resurrecting it and attempting to kill the crew of the Lexx. Mantrid is gravely wounded in the attack, and his servant transfers his consciousness to a spaceship he had created to save him. Kai kills the insect, resulting in His Shadow's essence becoming mixed with Mantrid's. Mantrid, now intertwined with His Shadow, swears revenge on humanity as the crew escapes.

The rest of the season involves the crew searching for a new home. During their adventures, they encounter Lyekka, a plant that can transform into a human appearance and feeds on living beings. During their adventures, Zev is killed but later reincarnated by Lyekka as Xev. The crew has various encounters with strange creatures and civilizations, such as a group of astronauts from a potato planet, a planet that creates sitcoms, a vapour that changes sex organs into their opposite, a crashed prisoner transport captained by a gay cyborg, a graveyard planet for priests of the Divine Order, a cult led by the Wozzard who seeks to turn all beautiful women into ugly ones, and an island of secluded, illiterate monks.

Eventually, the crew learns that Mantrid has been using drones to consume the universe and convert its matter into more drones, quickly bringing the Light Zone to an end. The crew attempt to flee by travelling to the centre of the universe, where the rules of causality are different, offering them a potential hideaway from Mantrid. During their escape, they encounter an interdimensional theatre crew that tells the full story of the Brunnen-G, including how they defeated the insect civilization and eventually became hopelessly depressed at their immortality, waiting for the forces of His Shadow to come and destroy them. Kai, refusing to surrender, led a small group of rebels against His Shadow in a final act of defiance. Reinvigorated by Kai's story, the crew decide to stop running and face Mantrid.

With the help of 790, the crew finds that they can convert some of Mantrid's drones to fight for them. During their attack on his ship, Lyekka boards Mantrid's pod and disables him, but Mantrid kills her before she can finish him off. With the crew about to be overwhelmed by Mantrid drones, Kai employs a last-ditch strategy to destroy Mantrid. Kai taunts Mantrid into pursuing the Lexx towards the centre of the universe with all of his drones. The resulting movement of mass creates a Big Crunch, which Mantrid, the drones, the Lexx, and the rest of the Light Zone are pulled into and destroyed by. However, the Lexx rematerializes in the Dark Zone through a portal as Xev and Kai destroy Mantrid and his final drone. Without any other nearby planets and the Lexx running out of food, the crew place themselves into stasis and the Lexx goes dormant while 790 reactivates annually to search for nearby planets.

=== Season 3 ===
After four thousand years in cryostasis, the crew reaches the twin planets Fire and Water. All of season three takes place on these two planets.

The crew meets people they knew from the Light and Dark Zones who cannot remember their past lives, though their personalities are the same. Fire is ruled by the charismatic Prince and his lackey Priest, while Water does not have a ruler. The inhabitants of both planets live in isolated towns. On Water, they live on islands in a huge ocean; on Fire, they live on massive towers separated by long stretches of desert. Water is inhabited by good people, while Fire is inhabited by evil people.

During Prince's first encounter with the crew, 790 is damaged and falls in love with Kai rather than Xev, and gradually behaves much more erratically. Prince seeks to destroy Water and attempts to win the crew over to his side, especially Xev. Believing that the Lexx is "the grain of sand that will tip the scales", he tests their sense of morality through various temptations, including taking the forms of other crew members to deceive them. The crew are frequently separated from each other, forcing them to act individually. After jumping from the Lexx to the surface of Water, Kai has trouble functioning normally without the other crew members. Deep beneath Water's surface, Kai encounters his soul essence awaiting rebirth.

During one of Prince's attacks on Water, Stanley is killed and Prince holds a trial over the destination of his soul, revealing Fire and Water as the afterlife. All his bad decisions are weighed against his good deeds and he is ultimately sentenced to eternal punishment on Fire. Enraged over Stanley's death, Xev orders the Lexx to destroy Fire, releasing all of its tortured souls. Consequently, Prince possesses the Lexx and uses it to destroy Water. Stanley is released and returns to his body aboard the Lexx, while Prince and the other souls reincarnate on a nearby blue planet.

=== Season 4 ===
The Lexx travels to Earth looking for food. 790 informs the crew that it is located in the very centre of the Dark Zone and assumes that it must be a very dangerous place. The crew again meet people they knew from the Light and Dark Zones and from Fire and Water. Only Prince and Priest can remember their previous lives.

On Earth, the reincarnated souls cause chaos across the planet. Priest is elected President of the United States and acts as a puppet ruler for Prince, who is now the head of the Bureau of Alcohol, Tobacco, and Firearms. Giggerotta becomes a Florida real estate agent and is elected pope, and the Wozzard becomes Dr. Ernst Longbore, a paraplegic rocket scientist. The crew attempts to settle in and make Earth their home, but keep getting caught up in absurd situations with the locals and in Prince's continuous attempts to take control of the Lexx. Although the crew keeps swearing not to return to the planet, they constantly find themselves back on Earth for one reason or another.

Kai's soul is trapped in limbo because he is undead, and he decides to regain his mortality. He makes a wager with Prince in a game of chess and wins, but Prince does not immediately fulfill his promise.

In the series finale, Earth is threatened by plants resembling Lyekka. The crew discovers that the fake Lyekka have destroyed other planets on their way through the Dark Zone and flooded the Earth with alien probes to sample the taste of its lifeforms. Furthermore, Dr. Longbore has created a rocket to escape Earth and, out of spite, leaves behind a particle accelerator to determine the mass of the Higgs boson particle, which will shrink the Earth to the size of a pea in the process. As Lyekka's asteroid attacks Earth, the crew flees with the particle accelerator to destroy the asteroid. As they leave Earth, Prince appears to Kai and fulfills his promise to him, restoring Kai's mortality. 790, now completely insane and still madly in love with Kai, takes advantage of the Lexx's senility and has it destroy Earth to kill any potential "competitors" for Kai. With Earth destroyed, the Lexx dying, and no other habitable planets nearby, the crew decide to sacrifice themselves to destroy Lyekka's asteroid. They travel inside the asteroid, but Kai becomes separated from the others as he is trapped inside with the particle accelerator. In a final sacrifice, Kai crashes into the centre of the asteroid as the accelerator calculates the particle's mass, destroying the asteroid. The Lexx's senility becomes terminal as it disintegrates. Xev and Stanley discover that the Lexx had created another ship within it before it died, "Little Lexx". Little Lexx gives Stanley its key as they search for a new home.

== Cast ==
From left to right: McManus as Kai (holding 790), Seeberg as Xev Bellringer, and Downey as Stanley Tweedle

=== Main ===
- Brian Downey as Stanley H. Tweedle: An assistant deputy backup courier for the Ostral-B heretics, before he was captured by the mercenary Feppo and tortured for information about Ostral-B planets. When this information was given to the Divine Order, the billions of lives lost were blamed on him and he was branded the "arch-traitor" by the heretics. The Divine Order made him a class four security guard on the Cluster, where his laziness frequently lands him in trouble with his supervisors. He is sleazy, cowardly, and only acts heroic when it directly benefits him.
- Eva Habermann (seasons 1–2) as Zev Bellringer: Placed into the wife bank at a young age, Zev became overweight and hopelessly ugly. When her to-be husband rejected her, she assaulted him and became a prisoner on the cluster, sentenced to become a brainwashed love-slave. However, the process was interrupted and while she became fit and beautiful, the brainwashing portion was incomplete, and she inadvertently had her DNA fused with that of a Cluster Lizard. Zev is strong and independent, and is obsessed with sex to the point where she is willing to sleep with almost any man, with the sole exception of Stanley, by whom she is repulsed. She is also in love with Kai, but he cannot feel love because of his undead state. Lisa Hynes portrays the original, overweight Zev.
- Xenia Seeberg (seasons 2–4) as Xev Bellringer: A clone of Zev with the same personality, but different physical appearance.
- Michael McManus as Kai: The last of the Brunnen-G, Kai led a suicidal attack to protect his home planet of Brunnis-2 against the forces of His Divine Shadow. He was killed, brainwashed, and left in an undead state to become an assassin in the Divine Order, killing whomever His Divine Shadow ordered him to. While protecting the Lexx from the Ostral-B heretics, he regained his previous memories and turned against His Shadow, escaping the Cluster with Stanley and Zev. Because of his undead state, Kai has no emotion and insists that the dead do not feel anything; because of this, he cannot reciprocate the love Zev feels for him.
- Jeffrey Hirschfield as the voice of 790/791/769: A robot assigned to work the Lusticon, he was decapitated in the attack on the Cluster and brainwashed into becoming a love-slave. Upon seeing Zev, he immediately falls in love with her. He is hostile towards everyone else, berating and ridiculing them with insults. Zev is indifferent to his affection towards her, much to his frustration. He possesses a vast knowledge on several different topics, though he is unwilling to share it with anyone but Zev. At the beginning of season three, he becomes damaged and falls in love with Kai instead, while gradually becoming more deranged and hostile to the rest of the crew.
- Tom Gallant as the voice of the Lexx, a machine/insect hybrid regarded as the most powerful weapon of destruction in the two universes. Created by His Divine Shadow to destroy planets and hold an iron grip across the Light Zone, the Lexx is stolen by Stanley, Zev, and Kai in the series premiere. The Lexx is capable of destroying an entire planet in a single shot, which it regards as its favourite pastime. Despite its strength, the Lexx is simple and does not possess much intelligence. Stanley is often at odds with the Lexx over what it wants it to do, having to explain simple subjects such as proper grammar.

=== Recurring ===
Mantrid (Dieter Laser) before his transference into a computer, accompanied by two drone arms

- Ellen Dubin as Giggerota: A cannibal convicted on the Cluster who escaped on the Lexx with the rest of the crew. She later attempted to kill them on Brunnis by making a dying star go supernova, though she was left behind and annihilated in the supernova while the crew escaped. She frequently appears in different forms throughout the series.
- Doreen Jacobi (season 1) as Wist: A colonist who attempted to stop the parasites from infecting the people of Klaagia, but became infected herself and serves at the chief likeness of the Queen.
- Michael Habeck (season 1) as Feppo: A mercenary who sexually tortured Stanley to retrieve amino acid codes that held the locations of Ostral-B planets and outposts.
- Andy Jones (season 1) as Smoor: Feppo's accomplice in torturing Stanley.
- Walter Borden (seasons 1–2; season 4) as His Divine Shadow, the mystical ruler of the Divine Order and League of 20,000 Planets: His Shadow rules the Light Zone with an iron fist. Using his flagship the Foreshadow, he destroys any planet that does not submit to his rule. Borden also portrays the "Wuzzard of Woz" and Dr. Ernst Longbore, a crippled rocket scientist who understands that Earth will soon be destroyed and seeks to escape it.
- Anna Cameron (season 1; season 4), Lorraine Segato (season 2) as The Time Prophet, an oracle for the Brunnen-G: The time prophet foretells that Kai will destroy the last remnants of the Insect Civilization. She appears sporadically throughout the series and guides the crew into making the correct decisions to save their lives.
- Louise Wischermann (seasons 2–4) as Lyekka, a plant capable of taking a human appearance, feeding on living organisms: She boards the Lexx early in season 2 and agrees not to consume the crew if they provide her with a regular supply of food, which typically consists of any guests that board the Lexx.
- Dieter Laser (seasons 2–3) as Mantrid, the supreme Bio-Vizier of the Divine Order: Mantrid was imprisoned by His Shadow on a remote planet. Trapped within a robotic body, he is killed and has his consciousness bonded with the remains of His Shadow, turning him into a homicidal megalomaniac who seeks to convert the entirety of the two universes into Mantrid drones.
- Patricia Zentilli (seasons 2–4) as Bunny, Priest's wife: She is blindly devoted to him and will do anything to please him. She possesses markedly low intelligence and often pouts and complains when things do not go her way.
- Jeff Pustil (seasons 2–4) as Fifi: Originally the head of a pleasure cruise, he later reincarnates on Water and ultimately sides with Prince in causing chaos. Unlike the other citizens of Water, he does not share their carefree, laissez-faire attitude.
- Nigel Bennett (seasons 3–4) as Isambard Prince: The ruler of Fire, Prince is an eccentric and mysterious individual, who does not know his origin but knows that he is "bad and must do bad things". He causes mischief throughout seasons 3 and 4, at first trying to turn the crew to his side to destroy Water, then later causing chaos across Earth as the head of the ATF. He is revealed in the series finale to be the personification of Death.
- Rolf Kanies (seasons 3–4) as Reginald J. Priest, Prince's personal servant. He worships Prince and submits to his every whim, even if it does not make sense or goes against all logic and reason. He is later reincarnated and elected as the President of the United States, but is still controlled by Prince and becomes his puppet ruler. He spends the majority of his time sleeping with Bunny, neglecting his Presidential duties, and launching nuclear attacks on countries that have wronged him or Bunny, including Cuba, Newfoundland, and Vietnam.
- Ralph Brown (season 3) as Duke, a military commander on Fire who challenged Prince for power
- Minna Aaltonen (season 4) as Vlad, originally a Divine Executioner for the Divine Order who dispatches Divine Assassins, Vlad was sent to Earth several centuries prior and became a local vampire legend. She attempts to destroy Kai for failing to perform his duties in the Divine Order.
- Tara Doyle (season 4) as Tina, one of Dr. Longbore's scientists who is infatuated with Kai

=== Guest ===
Thodin (Barry Bostwick) and his fellow Heretics on the Cluster

- Barry Bostwick (season 1) as Thodin: The leader of the Ostral-B heretics
- Tim Curry (season 1) as Poet Man: A hologram meant to guide visitors to Brunnis but went rogue to put them into danger
- Rutger Hauer (season 1) as Bog: The leader of the infected colonists on Klaagia
- Malcolm McDowell (season 1) as Yottskry: A defecting priest in the Divine Order who helps destroy the Giga Shadow
- Simon Licht (season 2) as Dr. Kazan: A mad doctor who attempts to steal the key to the Lexx from Zev
- Stephen McHattie (season 2; season 4) as Moss: The commanding officer of three astronauts from Potatohoe. He is later reincarnated on Earth as E. J. Moss, the leader of an anti-government militia
- Ross O'Hennessy (season 4) as Cedric: A competitor on Xevivor, a parody of Survivor

== Development ==
=== The Dark Zone ===
Salter Street Films' first sci-fi production, Def-Con 4, had been a moderate success and showed Paul Donovan that there was a potential market for similar material. Salter Street's next projects did not enjoy the same degree of success: George's Island, Buried on Sunday, and Paint Cans received praise but were not financially successful. Donovan then sought to create a World War I film using computer-generated imagery which had now become financially viable, but did not possess the estimated $35 million he needed to create it. In 1993, Donovan created a four-minute short film with a large amount of CGI and demonstrated it to international broadcasters to seek funding. The tape, titled The Dark Zone, featured security guard Stanley Tweedle refusing to let a ship dock because of an invalid security code, then being reprimanded by his superiors. This scene would be reworked and included in the first episode of Lexx. Broadcast companies were impressed, prompting Donovan to build off the demo tape and abandon his original World War I idea. The first season was greenlit in Summer 1995 with a budget of $13 million, barely three months before filming began.

=== Writing ===
Donovan had trouble finding writers for the show as most resided in Hollywood and outside of his budget. He eventually came across Lex Gigeroff and Jeffrey Hirschfield, calling them "gems in the rough". Hirschfield had a background in theatre and acting, but was unable to find work and on the verge of abandoning the industry entirely until he met Paul, while Gigeroff was working odd acting jobs in Halifax.

Donovan described the thought process behind the show as "Dirty Dozen meets Alien or Beavis and Butt-Head". He also found inspiration in Fires on the Plain and Dark Star and considers the show to be a homage to Space Precinct. Many of the crew were also fans of Red Dwarf. Donovan found that many science fiction films and shows at the time were too serious and wanted to create something more "fun" with a higher production value, sexual motifs, and aspects of dark humour, which Hirschfield says comes from the desensitization of violence in Halifax, citing clubbing harp seals as an example. They rejected making the series scientifically accurate or logical, with writer Hirschfield explaining, "We only wanted enough science to get us through the stories. The Lexx has a particle accelerator, and that's all you need to know. We don't want to bother with dilithium crystals. The Lexx gets its fuel from eating. Simple enough." They openly acknowledged the large amount of sex and violence present within the script, with Gigeroff admitting that he "[wants] teenage boys to pull off to Zev's poster." When asked about Zev's appearance and the amount of sexual content, Gigeroff responded that "I think we have far too puritanical notions about sex. Sex is fun, sex is good, and I hope we can get a lot of it in the show." He also addressed the criticism he received from the Halifax film community about the sexual content, joking "God, you can't even show a woman as a sex object without someone thinking it's bad." The Lexx's name was formed by finding a word that would work well in all languages without translation, and it doubled as a pun on Lex Gigeroff's name.

The scripts for "Super Nova" and "Feeding Pattern" were changed several times during shooting. Ron Oliver, a writer for "Super Nova", says "When I first got the script, it was all over the place because the writers had hit a wall with it. The main characters were these buffoons. That probably works on paper, but the audience needed something to hold on to. So that had to be tidied up a bit by adding some motivation for these characters." Scripts for season two were commissioned before season one premiered.

=== Casting ===
Although our characters will try, in their own bumpy way, to do the right thing, basically they're just in it for themselves. If a planet deserves to be blown up, it's blown up.

Paul Donovan, co-creator

Brian Downey had worked with Donovan previously on Norman's Awesome Experience and portrayed Stanley Tweedle in the original demo tape. Downey describes his character as having "some heroic qualities, but it's always a surprise when he does something heroic." Eva Habermann portrayed Zev after her love-slave transformation, saying that "She doesn't see herself as a sex slave. I like the part because she's not quite what she seems. She's tough, and people underestimate her because of her new appearance. And that's what makes it funny." After season one, Habermann would go on to other projects, leaving a gap in the show for her character after the end of season one; this was alleviated by having Zev die and later revived into Xev, now played by Xenia Seeberg.

The character of Thodin (played by Barry Bostwick) was created to subvert the audience into believing he was the hero and main character of the series, only to have him be killed off by Kai in the premiere. Malcolm McDowell agreed to play the part of Yottskry after a previous film he was scheduled to star in fell through, saying that he was drawn to the script because of how "peculiar" and "weird" it was and that he had wanted to visit Nova Scotia. Rutger Hauer was also attracted to the part of Bog because of the script, saying "It takes a lot of liberties—but in a good sense. This goes farther than anything I've ever done." Tim Curry's character as Poet Man was filmed on the final day of shooting entirely in front of a green screen. He compared the series favourably to his time on The Rocky Horror Picture Show, saying "I'm grimly aware that Rocky Horror was done on a non-existent budget over three weeks in a tiny theatre. Yet it was a good idea. Sometimes it's important to show up for guys with really good ideas."

Nigel Bennett had previously worked with Donovan on Paint Cans and was approached to play the role of Prince in seasons three and four. He liked the character "because he didn't say a word for 20 pages". As part of his character, Bennett had at least three different outfits and would have his hair and eyebrows bleached "about every ten to fourteen days".

=== Filming ===
Season one was shot in Halifax, Nova Scotia, primarily at a repurposed Volvo plant on the waterfront. Additional scenes were shot at Babelsberg Studios in Berlin. The "protoblood" that Kai lives off of was a combination of honey and hand lotion. One hallway set for the Cluster was so long that it extended outside the studio, through a dressing room, and into another studio. The command "chair" for the Lexx was outfitted with easily removable "skin", allowing it to be shot from any angle. This skin would later be removed entirely after season one. The food that the Lexx produces for the crew was mashed yams in season one, and rice pudding for the rest of the series.

The Season two episode "The Net" is largely made up of recycled footage from the previous episode "The Web". Director Chis Bould says this was done due to production constraints, as both episodes had to be shot in nine days as opposed to the regular schedule of one episode over eight days.

In the Season Four episode "The Game", Kai plays a game of chess with Prince to win his soul back. Their game is a move-for-move recreation of the first casual match played between Louis Charles Mahe De La Bourdonnais and Alexander McDonnell in the World Championship of 1834.

==== Design ====
In this show it's not a friendly marriage of man and dragonfly. I compare it to the old high school experiment where you make the dead frog's legs move with a small battery.

Nigel Scott, stage designer

Donovan rejected the sleek, futuristic look common in science fiction in favour of organic, fleshy materials. Many of the creatures and machines are a hybrid of organic material and technology. Producer Bill Fleming compares it to a surgical implant or artificial limb, saying "it's functional, but it sure doesn't look good up close." According to set designer Nigel Scott, "Our world is chaotic. All the cars and buildings are designed by different people, so nothing really matches. And Lexx is exactly the same—it's just chaos." The insect wars and the biological designs of the ships were made a central part of the story after they had been designed, with writers using the concept art as a basis for the plot.

Head art director Mark Laing says that the design of the Cluster was based around medieval cities, explaining how "the whole city is built on top of a ruin built on a ruin. Buildings are built on top of buildings, incorporating still standing structures into their own structures, which are also somewhat run down."

The Lexx itself has sexual undertones as part of its design. Laing points out how the Lexx's showerhead "is this luminous pink tube that's a little too interested in its work... It'll snake all over you if you're not paying attention. It's quite frisky." Sources have also pointed out the Lexx's seemingly phallic appearance. Writer Jeffrey Hirschfield only incorporated the bare minimum of "accurate" science when absolutely necessary.

=== Post-production ===
Lexx is a very complex build of elements to create final effects scenes. With the access to live action background plates, greenscreen and bluescreen foreground plates, motion control and model elements, as well as 3D and 2D computer animation, we have the thread with the AVID Illusion compositing package to put these pieces together.

— Brian Howald, VFX Supervisor

Computer-generated imagery for season one was created by twenty animators over the course of fifteen months. For "Super Nova", matte paintings were used as the show was quickly going over budget for CGI work. Bob Munroe, president of C.O.R.E. Digital Pictures, states that CGI shots get expensive very quickly. "So when the script said 'a brand new planet you've never seen before,' that's a lot of work, and it may translate into $200,000. It got to the point that it was easier to do matte paintings than five people building this whole world." Up to 70% of the final shots contain CGI in some form. The scene where the Lexx destroys the customs station was a model that was blown up in the parking lot of the VFX studio. Animations were done through three production houses, including C.O.R.E. Digital Pictures in Toronto and Berlin and pixelMotion in Halifax. Models and animations were created using Silicon Graphics Indigo workstations, as well as Avid 1000 and 8000 series workstations. Modelling and animation software such as Prisms, Flint, and PowerAnimator were used to create digital imagery. A render farm that was 60 times faster than the industry norm was used for rendering animations.

== Music ==
Two official Lexx soundtracks have been released. The first album, Tales from a Parallel Universe, consists of music from season one. The second album, Lexx: The Series, consists of music from seasons two through four.

"Brigadoom" (S02E18) is a musical episode that tells of the destruction of Brunnis-2 and the death of Kai in a theatre format. Many of the themes from this episode are based on German nursery rhymes with new lyrics. The usage of existing musical themes as well as the addition of an outside choir has placed these tracks into a legal grey area; as a result, they have not been officially released.

Tales from a Parallel Universe

Film score by Marty Simon
- Released: August 12, 1997
- Length: 58:13
- Label: Varèse Sarabande
- Producer: Marty Simon

All tracks are written by Marty Simon.

No.	Title	Length
1.	"Cluster Anthem"	0:35
2.	"Prisoner Transport"	2:05
3.	"Snake Chase"	3:34
4.	"Welcome to the Dark Zone"	0:55
5.	"Battle of the Universe"	1:06
6.	"Planet Cruise"	2:45
7.	"Poet Man"	3:51
8.	"Cryochamber"	4:00
9.	"Love Muscle"	1:49
10.	"Gigashadow March"	2:57
11.	"Yo-A-O (Fight Song of the Brunnen-G)"	0:49
12.	"The Lexx Escape"	2:30
13.	"Zev's Shower"	3:14
14.	"Cleric Theme"	2:30
15.	"Kai Collapse"	5:16
16.	"Shadows and Prophets"	8:56
17.	"Feppo's Party"	3:17
18.	"Milk Fed Boys"	0:53
19.	"Brunnis"	2:20
20.	"Fantasy Dance"	2:16
21.	"Moth Ride"	2:27
Total length:		58:13

Lexx: The Series

Film score by Marty Simon
- Released: January 2001
- Length: 1:07:56
- Label: GNP Crescendo
- Producer: Marty Simon

All tracks are written by Marty Simon.

No.	Title	Length
1.	"Opening Theme Season 3"	1:02
2.	"790 Quote"	0:18
3.	"Prince to Lexx"	2:20
4.	"All He Wants Is Sex"	2:38
5.	"Angel Song"	1:38
6.	"A Walk in the Desert"	4:15
7.	"Seduction"	0:58
8.	"Wild, Wild Lexx"	3:42
9.	"Galley"	2:41
10.	"Opening Theme Season 2, Version 1"	1:03
11.	"Holograms"	2:54
12.	"The Search"	3:09
13.	"Xev's Dream"	4:13
14.	"Garden"	6:33
15.	"Lexx Hungry"	0:17
16.	"Into the Garden"	1:36
17.	"Lyekka/Potato Hoe"	4:58
18.	"Gondola Ride"	4:47
19.	"Mantrid Medley"	3:49
20.	"Prince Theme"	2:01
21.	"Medieval Dance"	1:38
22.	"Girl Awakes/Norb Launch"	1:48
23.	"The Xev Show"	0:32
24.	"Demented Chase"	2:28
25.	"Yo-A-O/I'm Leaving"	1:06
26.	"Zev Dies"	2:23
27.	"Final Scene"	1:42
28.	"Opening Theme Season 2, Version 2"	1:27
Total length:		1:07:56

== Episodes ==
Season	Episodes	Originally released	
Season	Episodes	First released	Last released
1	4	April 18, 1997	September 11, 1997
2	20	December 11, 1998	April 23, 1999
3	13	February 6, 2000	April 30, 2000
4	24	July 13, 2001	April 26, 2002

There are four seasons of Lexx, totalling 61 episodes. Season One debuted in Canada on April 18, 1997, and consisted of four two-hour TV movies (sometimes screened as eight one-hour episodes), alternatively titled by Sci Fi for the United States Audience as Tales from a Parallel Universe. Some episode guides do not list the two-hour movies as part of the series but list the subsequent seasons as the first through third.

Season One consists of four 90-minute movies, following the misadventures of Stanley Tweedle, Zev Bellringer, Kai, 790, and the Lexx as they escape from the Cluster and try to find a new home in the Dark Zone, an evil and unforgiving universe. The story arc ends with their return to the Cluster as they destroy the Giga Shadow, the last remaining insect.

Season Two consists of twenty 48-minute episodes, with a story arc concerning the evil scientist Mantrid who attempts to convert the entire mass of the two universes into Mantrid drones; flying, self-replicating robot arms. The crew tricks him into moving all the converted mass into a central point in the universe, creating a Big Crunch and destroying the Light Zone.

Season Three consists of thirteen episodes in which the exhausted Lexx is trapped in orbit around the warring planets Fire and Water, and the crew encounters Prince, the enigmatic and cheerful evil ruler of Fire, who identifies himself as Death at the end of season four. Fire is the afterlife for all evil souls, and the location for much of season three. It shares a tight mutual orbit and an atmosphere with Water, the afterlife for all good souls in the two universes. Both worlds are locked in a perpetual war. The souls on Water and Fire have no memory of how they arrived there; they simply "woke up". They are incapable of sexual reproduction and there are no children on either planet. When anyone dies on Fire or Water, they go to a spiritual holding cell in which time stands still, giving the illusion that no time has passed no matter how long they have been there. When space opens up they "wake up" again, whole and healthy on their respective home planet. Many of the planets' inhabitants are played by characters from Seasons One and Two, and while most of them share the same personality traits as their previous selves, they have no knowledge of their prior lives. Fire is destroyed by the Lexx under the command of Xev at the end of season three. With Fire gone, Prince possesses the Lexx and destroys Water. When Water and Fire are both destroyed, it is revealed that both planets were on the other side of the Sun and that all the souls contained on both worlds have reincarnated on Earth.

Season 4 follows the Lexx as it arrives at Earth in the early 2000s, only to find that Prince (now Isambard Prince and head of the Bureau of Alcohol, Tobacco and Firearms, which runs the United States) and several other old adversaries have also arrived there. The crew's arrival coincides with a large asteroid-like vessel filled with robotic carrots that sample the flavors of the various lifeforms on Earth. Between them, Prince, and the Lexx several large chunks of Earth are destroyed—including Orlando, Ottawa (a Canadian metonymical in-joke), Tokyo, the Amazon rainforest, and Holland, which the Lexx eats—before the series finale, televised on April 26, 2002. Priest, the President of the United States, also destroys Cuba, Newfoundland, and Vietnam with thermonuclear bombs. The Lexx is also responsible for the destruction of Pluto, Mars, Venus, and finally Earth in its entirety.

== Releases ==
=== VHS ===
Salter Street Films in conjunction with Koch Vision released the first season on four VHS tapes as 'lost episodes' in 1996.

CFP Video, a distribution division of Columbia-TriStar Home Video, released a promo tape for 'I Worship His Shadow' in 1997.

Paramount, in conjunction with Showtime, released the first season on four VHS tapes in 1997.

Acorn Media released seasons 2 and 3 on VHS between 2001 and 2002.

Kult T.V., a subsidiary of Contender Limited, released season one on VHS as 'Lexx: Stories from the Dark Zone' in 1999. They also released season two on VHS, this time as 'Lexx: The Series' in 2000.

=== DVD ===
Region 1

Acorn Media released seasons 2–4 on DVD in single-volume collections as well as complete season sets between 2002 and 2004. These releases have been discontinued and are out of print. Echo Bridge Home Entertainment has released all four seasons on DVD in the US only. On September 3, 2013, Echo Bridge released Lexx – The Complete Series as a DVD box set in Region 1. The nine-disc set features all 61 episodes of the series. In Canada, Alliance Home Entertainment has released all four seasons on DVD.

Region 2

Seasons One through Three were released on VHS and Region 2 DVD in the United Kingdom by Contender Limited, although the Season Three DVDs were initially exclusive to the MVC Entertainment chain of stores and all volumes have since been deleted. Contender failed to obtain the rights to Season Four, which instead went to Momentum Pictures (a subsidiary of Alliance Atlantis). Momentum Pictures has not released any DVDs.

MediumRare Entertainment released The Complete Series in a 19-disc box set in the United Kingdom in early 2011.

All four seasons were also released on DVD in Germany. However, the first-season episodes of the German DVD release were cut to receive a 16-and-up rating.

Region 4

Beyond Home Entertainment released all four seasons on DVD in Australia: season 1 on July 11, 2007, season 2 on September 12, 2007, season 3 on October 17, 2007, and season 4 on January 16, 2008. On May 13, 2009, Beyond Home Entertainment released Lexx – The Complete Series, a 19-disc box set featuring all 61 episodes of the series in a special collectible tin. On December 1, 2010, Beyond Home Entertainment re-released the 19-disc set as a box set rather than the collector's tin released the year previously.

=== Online ===
Lexx is available through streaming television. Netflix provided versions of the show in the United States as edited for American broadcast, though as of December 2013 it is no longer available. Similarly, Hulu had stopped streaming the show by November 2013 due to rights lapsing. In 2017, Lexx was available on Amazon Prime in the United States, United Kingdom, and Australia by mid-2018. Although still included with Amazon Prime in the United Kingdom and Australia, the series was removed from Amazon Prime in the United States in 2019, though episodes remained available for individual purchase and download. As of 2026, all four seasons were again available.

As of January 2020, all four seasons are available to view in the United States on Hoopla and for free on Vudu. As of April 2020, all four seasons are available to view in the United States and United Kingdom through The Roku Channel.

== Reception ==
Season One holds a 43% critic rating on Rotten Tomatoes based on seven reviews. In a negative review, Linda Stasi of New York Daily News says she "can only imagine that the great SciFi channel must have been captured by idiot monsters from outer space and Germany". Staff of The Independent called it "a wacky German-Canadian sci-fi import for people who find Babylon 5 too cerebral... it's extremely gory, not a little nasty and rather fun".

TV Guide called Lexx "a siren of distinction for its black comedy, skewed take on the human condition and open sexuality..." while calling the visual effects "stunning". Annalee Newitz of Wired calls Lexx "one of the most underrated science fiction TV shows of the late twentieth century", explaining that "some of the episodes are silly and bad, but the best ones are like Barbarella crossed with Kids in the Hall and multiplied by Blake's 7."

Gavin Edwards of Spin gave praise to the visual effects, writing that "there was a time when a German-Canadian production like this would have had sets with wobbly walls and laughable special effects, but now computer costs are low enough that even when the story line flags—often—you will still be dazzled by state-of-the-art galactic vistas, exploding planets, and gargantuan phallic symbols streaking through the stars."

In a retrospective, Chris Allcock of Den of Geek writes that Lexx's appeal comes from a combination of its antiheroes, overarching plots and themes, experimentation with new ideas, and its simplistic humor, concluding that Lexx is "not exactly high-concept sci-fi, but damned if we didn't laugh anyway. For better or worse, Lexx really was one of a kind—and that's why we loved it".

Lexx has garnered a cult following, primarily through word-of-mouth over the early Internet. A large number of fan sites have been created including forums, chat rooms, and sharing arts and crafts with other fans. The series is frequently referred to by the creators and fans as "Star Trek's evil twin". Salter Street would host an annual "UnCon" convention where fans were invited to tour the studio and sets and meet the cast and crew. Each of the three conventions had over thirty, sixty, and a hundred guests each year, respectively.

SciFiNow magazine included Lexx on their list of "Ten Overlooked Nineties Sci-Fi Shows". Xenia Seeberg as Xev appeared on a July 2000 cover of TV Guide and was ranked No. 14 on UGO's list of "Our Favorite Ladies from Other Planets".

== Legacy ==
The cast and crew have been asked on multiple occasions about continuing the series in the form of a spin-off or movie. While the cast acknowledge rumors about talks of a movie being in the works, Xenia Seeberg stated it is unlikely to occur due to funding and rights issues. Brian Downey also states that Sci Fi was "barely" interested in season four. The producers have stated on multiple occasions that the series was not cancelled and ended on their terms. Several members of the cast, including Downey, Seeberg, and Dubin, have stated they would love to work with each other again.

Ellen Dubin says she was offered her role as Aunt Ilene on Napoleon Dynamite as the director Jared Hess was a fan of her part on Lexx as Giggerota.

Some of the sets used in the show, such as the Lexx's cryochamber, appear as sets on Made in Canada, which is also produced by Salter Street.

== Broadcast history ==
The show's seasons had very different tones. While the original TV movies and second season were mostly science fiction drama with dark comedy, season three was more serious and explored themes of life, death, and reincarnation on the planets Fire and Water. The show's final season—set on Earth in the early 2000s—took many turns into pure farce and introduced magic and other new elements.

Lexx was shown originally on Citytv in Canada and Showtime in the United States, then later picked up by Space in Canada, Channel 5 in the United Kingdom and then the Sci-Fi Channel in the United States. On Sci-Fi, it aired in the same Friday night lineup as Farscape, and the somewhat similar premise for both shows (a misfit crew living on a huge, living starship) was often noted by critics, despite Lexx having premiered two years prior to Farscape.

=== Different versions ===
The American release of Lexx differs slightly from other regions. In the beginning of the first film, the American version omits a scene in which Stanley is fooled and captured by Feppo. Other versions place this scene between the death of Kai and the time when Stanley wakes up on the cluster 2,008 years later, while the American release places it at the start of "Giga Shadow". Thodin's bug bomb was also given a voice and personality. Paul Donovan says the changes were in response to TV audiences being confused about Stanley's loyalty and the bug bomb's purpose, joking that "My mother didn't understand it at all."

=== Rated Lexx ===
As part of Sci Fi's acquisition of broadcasting rights for Lexx to the American audience, Rated Lexx was produced as a four-part serialized story to summarize the events that occurred in the series premiere. The story is told through both new and recycled footage and is narrated by the Lexx and 790 as they travel through a portal into the Light Zone, who speak directly to the audience about the events that have occurred thus far. It also provides a backstory for 790: His organic brain belonged to a waitress in a bar that attempted to bribe a priest in the Divine Order with sexual favors, but was caught and sentenced to become a 790 droid.

== See also ==
- Dark Star
- Farscape
- Red Dwarf
- Space Precinct
