= Tom McCamus =

Canadian film and theatre actor (born 1955)

- Born: July 25, 1955 (age 71); Winnipeg, Manitoba, Canada
- Occupation: Actor
- Years active: 1982–present

Tom McCamus (born July 25, 1955) is a Canadian film and theatre actor. He is most widely known for his works on the television show Mutant X and drama film Room.

== Early life, family and education ==
McCamus was born in Winnipeg, Manitoba, Canada, the eldest son of a Labatt executive and a library science professor. He was raised in London, Ontario, beginning at age ten.

Originally planning to be a writer or a teacher, he found an interest in theatre when he took a drama class at Oakridge Secondary School. He subsequently landed a small role in a version of Antigone staged by the local Theatre London's Young Company and subsequently attended the University of Windsor's school of dramatic art.

== Career ==
=== Theatre ===
McCamus moved to Toronto in 1980 and settled into a steady theatre career, spending his winters there while transplanting to Niagara-on-the-Lake in the summer, as a member of the famed Shaw Festival troupe. He became one of the country's more in-demand stage players, earning particular notice for his leading role in a complex staging of Peter Pan, which debuted in 1987 and returned by popular demand for the 1988 season. He is also known for his performance in Eugene O'Neill's Long Day's Journey into Night, one of the Stratford Festival's historic plays. He received further praise when he performed triple duty during the 1998 edition of the festival, acting as Marcus Brutus in Julius Caesar, Don John in Much Ado About Nothing, and one of the tramps in Waiting for Godot. He has performed multiple role in several other seasons, such as 2010, when he returned to Peter Pan—this time as Captain Hook—and played Valmont in Dangerous Liaisons.

In 1994, McCamus won what was then Canada's top theatre accolade, the Dora Award for Best Leading Actor, for his performance in Abundance, earning additional nominations on prior and later occasions, including 1992 when he was nominated alongside his wife Chick Reid.

=== Film and television ===
Following a few TV appearances beginning in 1985, McCamus made his film debut in director Paul Donovan's time-travel comedy A Switch in Time (1989). He garnered positive reviews for his role as a mental patient in the historical drama Beautiful Dreamers, before earning wide acclaim as struggling actor Henry Adler in David Wellington's 1993 film I Love a Man in Uniform. For his performance, he won the Genie Award for Best Actor, and earned more positive reviews from the international press when the film was shown at Cannes' Directors' Fortnight. McCamus has been nominated for the Genie Award on two occasions since, for Wellington's Long Day's Journey into Night (1996), in which he reprised his stage role, and for the Oscar-nominated The Sweet Hereafter (1997), directed by Atom Egoyan.

McCamus came to the attention of a wider audience playing the villainous Mason Eckhart in the Marvel TV series Mutant X. Although McCamus proved sufficiently popular that he appeared in every episode of the first season, something that was not originally planned, he quit the show to star as Richard III and Mack the Knife at the Stratford Festival. He only returned to Mutant X to make occasional appearances in the second and third seasons.

In 2005, McCamus starred in the CBC film Waking Up Walter: The Walter Gretzky Story as famous hockey dad Walter Gretzky, for which he won Best Actor honors at both the ACTRA Awards and the Gemini Awards. Other notable screen appearances include Shake Hands with the Devil (2007), and the Ken Finkleman miniseries At the Hotel (2006). He appeared in the 2019 season of CBC's Street Legal in a supporting role.

== Personal life ==
McCamus is married to theatre and occasional TV actress Chick Reid, a fellow alumn of the Shaw Festival troupe. They reside in Warkworth, Ontario.

== Filmography ==
Year(s)	Title	Role	Notes
1987	And Then You Die	Jimmy	
1988	A Switch in Time	Norman	Also known as Norman's Awesome Experience
1988–89	Friday the 13th: The Series	Atticus Rook / Frank Edwards	TV series; 2 episodes
1990	Beautiful Dreamers	Leonard Thomas	
1993	I Love a Man in Uniform	Henry Adler	
1993	Guilty as Sin	Ray Schiff	
1994	The Circle Game	Frank	
1996	Great Performances	Edmund Tyrone	Episode: "Long Day's Journey into Night"
1997	The Sweet Hereafter	Sam	
1997	Bach Cello Suite #6: Six Gestures	J.S. Bach	
1998	Last Night	Radio D.J.	Voice
1999	The Passion of Ayn Rand	Richard	TV movie
2000	The Spreading Ground	Johnny Gault	
2000	Possible Worlds	George Barber	
2000	The Claim	Burn	
2000	Foreign Objects		TV series
2001	Century Hotel	Nicholas	
2001–04	Mutant X	Mason Eckhart	TV series; 26 episodes
2002	Steal	Jerry	
2002	The Nature of Nicholas	Father	
2002	Perfect Pie	Don Rayford	
2003	Trinity	Dr. Clerval	
2003	The Newsroom	Bob Daniels	TV series; Episode: "Death 1, George 0"
2004	Confessions of a Teenage Drama Queen	Calum	
2004	Ginger Snaps Back: The Beginning	Wallace Rowlands	
2004	Siblings	Mr. Phillips	
2005	Black Widow	Detective Pressman	
2007	Shake Hands with the Devil	Phil Lancaster	
2008	Killshot	Paul Scallen / FBI Chief	
2009	Cairo Time	Mark	
2009–10	Spliced	Lord Wingus Eternum	TV series
2012	The Samaritan	Deacon	
2014–15	Orphan Black	Dr. Nealon	TV series; 7 episodes
2015	King John	King John	
2015	Antony and Cleopatra	Enobarbus	
2015	Room	Leo	
2019	The Tempest	Stephano	
2019	Coriolanus	Menenius Agrippa	
