= The Real Howard Spitz =

- Video cover
- Directed by: Vadim Jean
- Written by: Jurgen Wolff
- Produced by: Paul Brooks
- Starring: Kelsey Grammer; Amanda Donohoe; Genevieve Tessier; Joseph Rutten; Patrick McKenna
- Cinematography: Glen MacPherson
- Edited by: Pia Di Ciaula
- Music by: David A.Hughes; John Murphy
- Distributed by: New Line Cinema
- Release date: August 28, 1998 (U.S.)
- Running time: 102 minutes
- Language: English

The Real Howard Spitz is a 1998 family comedy film directed by Vadim Jean, produced by Paul Brooks and written by Jurgen Wolff. Starring Kelsey Grammer, Amanda Donohoe and Genevieve Tessier, it is a Canadian and U.K co-production. A failed detective writer, Howard Spitz has hit rock bottom until an 8-year-old girl helps him write children's books.

== Plot ==
Howard Spitz is the author behind a string of poorly selling detective novels. He discovers that in contrast children's books enjoy strong sales. Believing it an easy way to make money, Spitz becomes a children's author with his new book character, a bovine detective named "Crafty Cow", but finds writing for his new audience significantly difficult.

Whilst doing research at the local library, he submits his drafts to a little girl called Samantha Kershaw who polishes them up. In return, she asks Spitz to find her father who left her mother before she was born. Spitz also discovers that to become a successful children's author he will need to do public appearances with his audience. Terrified at the prospect of having to spend time with children, Spitz hires a struggling actor to serve as his public face. But soon his doppelgänger is having delusions of grandeur, as his book becomes more and more successful.

Finally, at an awards ceremony, he confesses his identity, and finds that after spending so much time with Samantha, and after all the help she's given him, he feels more at ease around children.

== Cast ==
- Kelsey Grammer as Howard Spitz
- Amanda Donohoe as Laura Kershaw
- Genevieve Tessier as Samantha Kershaw
- Joseph Rutten as Lou
- Patrick McKenna as Roger
- Kay Tremblay as Theodora Winkle
- David Christoffel as Bill Sellers
- Lex Gigeroff as Ronnie Relish
- Gary Levert as Red Allen
- Jeffrey Hirschfield as Lawrence
- Denny Doherty as Balthazar Mishkin
- Edward Gregson as Aaron
- Joanne Hagen as Waitress
- Justin Friesen as Lionel - TV Show Kid

== Reception ==
Nick Griffiths, writing for Empire film magazine, noted that Kelsey Grammer "dominates the screen with a masterful blend of self-referential humour and Frasier-style sarcasm - despite having to spend much of the film dressed as his bovine protagonist." He concluded that "The script often threatens to plunge into family film saccharine, but is saved by Jean's assured direction, a performance well beyond her years from Tessier and an often hysterically funny turn from McKenna as moronic actor."
