= A Midsummer's Nightmare =

A Midsummer's Nightmare may refer to:

- "A Midsummer's Nightmare", an episode of Lexx
- "A Midsummer's Nightmare", an episode of The Suite Life of Zack & Cody
- A Midsummer's Nightmare (novel), by Garry Kilworth
- A Midsummer's Nightmare (film), a 2017 Lifetime Television Movie
