= Love Grows =

Love Grows may refer to:

- "Love Grows (Where My Rosemary Goes)", a 1970 song by Edison Lighthouse
- "Love Grows" (LEXX episode), a 1999 episode of the Canadian TV show Lexx
