= Lex Gigeroff =

Television writer and actor

- Born: Alexander Kier Gigeroff; June 29, 1962; Ottawa, Ontario, Canada
- Died: December 25, 2011 (aged 49); Fredericton, New Brunswick, Canada
- Occupations: Screenwriter; actor
- Children: 2

Alexander Kier Gigeroff (June 29, 1962 – December 25, 2011), known professionally as Lex Gigeroff, was a Canadian television writer and actor best remembered as a co-creator of the science fiction series Lexx. He also appeared in the comedy series Liocracy and the short film Treevenge.

== Biography ==
Gigeroff was born in Ottawa. His father Alex K. Gigeroff (1931–2016) was a prominent artist, playwright and writer on criminology and the law who was the son of Macedonian Canadians: both of his parents were poor immigrants from Macedonian villages and "Gigeroff" was his father's immigrant's assigned name. Lex's brother Andre Haines is an artist and musician who also contributed to the Lexx series as an actor and songwriter.

Gigeroff grew up in Yarmouth, Nova Scotia. When he was 10 he wrote a play for Cub Scouts which was picked up as a project for a youth group in Toronto and eventually staged. In 1985, he graduated from Dalhousie University with a major in English; during the last year he served as the president of the Dalhousie Student Union.

He also worked as an announcer at the CJLS radio in the late 1970s and became actively involved with the campus-community radio CKDU-FM, serving as a programming manager from 1987 to 1989. While performing a sketch in a radio comedy show he was noticed by Paul Donovan who invited Gigeroff to act in several of his movies.

In 1993, he wrote and starred in a one-man stage show, and after Donovan saw it he shared his idea of a science fiction TV show with Gigeroff and Jeffrey Hirschfield which would eventually develop into the Lexx series. Filming began in the fall of 1995 and the series was released by the Showcase channel in 1997; with strong ratings it lasted for four seasons and sold to over 100 countries around the world. Apart from writing, Gigeroff also starred in various roles while his name became an inspiration for the show's title.

He continued his writing and acting career, working in theatre, film and TV. Those included The Real Howard Spitz comedy and the Liocracy series, a number of short films and children's shows he created with Jason Shipley, a stage play Conrad and Barbara and a short comedy movie Benoit he wrote and directed in 2010. He was also working on his first feature film Gillian and Giles as a director which was to be shot in the Dominican Republic.

Gigeroff died at his home in Fredericton, New Brunswick, on December 25, 2011, from a heart attack.
