= Brian Downey (actor) =

Canadian actor

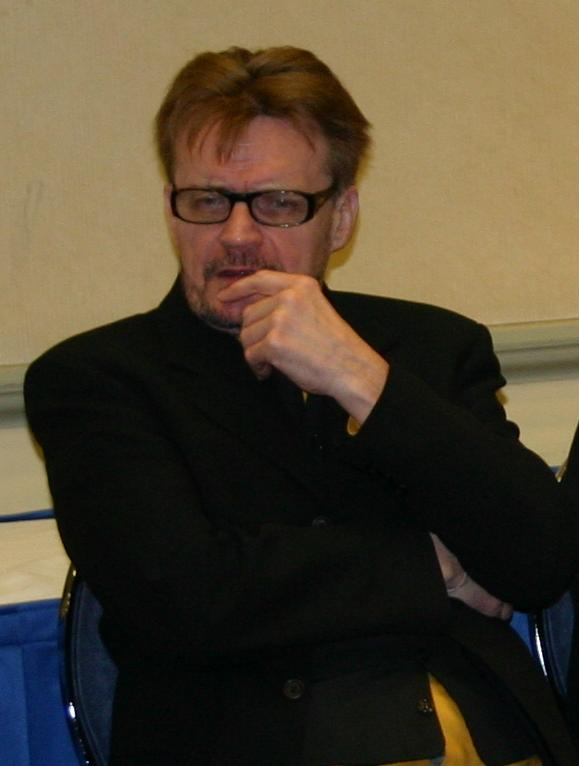
- Downey sitting with fellow guests at the second annual Sci-Fi on the Rock convention on 20 April 2008
- Born: 31 October 1944 (age 81); St. John's, Newfoundland (now Newfoundland and Labrador, Canada)
- Occupation: Actor
- Years active: 1986–present

Brian Downey (born 31 October 1944) is a Canadian actor best known for his portrayal of Stanley Tweedle in the science-fiction television series Lexx.

== Career ==
Downey is mainly a character actor and has appeared in various films and television series, including Up at Ours and a recurring role on Millennium. His first film role was in a 1986 Andy Jones film called The Adventure of Faustus Bidgood, which features the entire cast of CODCO. Downey has enjoyed a long professional relationship with Lexx creator Paul Donovan, dating back at least to 1988, when Donovan cast Downey in the time travel adventure film Norman's Awesome Experience.

Downey starred in the main role as Stanley H. Tweedle in the science fiction series Lexx, spanning four made-for-TV films and three subsequent full-length seasons. He also appeared as Cardinal Juan de Mella in Donovan's medieval TV thriller The Conclave. Downey has worked with popular actors such as Jessica Lange, JoBeth Williams and Sam Rockwell and directors such as Joe Sargent. He won his only acting award at the 2010 Atlantic Film Festival for his role in Whirligig, directed by Chaz Thorne, with whom he has worked on two previous features. He played the evil gang leader "The Drake", in the feature film Hobo with a Shotgun, starring Rutger Hauer and directed by Jason Eisener.

Downey is also a musician and writer. Before being recruited as an actor, he spent many years as a bass player, guitarist, and blues harmonica player. As of 2020, a Canadian talent management firm advertises him as a big band bandleader and drummer, playing swing music. He has been a writer for many stage plays and has led many scriptwriting workshops. His first full-length stage play, Peter's Other War, was produced during the summer of 2009.

== Filmography ==
=== Film ===
| Year | Title | Role | Notes |
|---|---|---|---|
| 1986 | The Adventure of Faustus Bidgood | Fred Bonia-Coombs | |
| 1986 | John and the Missus | Burgess | |
| 1989 | Norman's Awesome Experience | Dr. Nobbelmeyer | |
| 1989 | George's Island | Mr. Beane | |
| 1992 | Secret Nation | Charles Maddox | |
| 2002 | Little Dickie | Bartender | Short Film |
| 2006 | The Conclave | Cardinal Juan De Mella | |
| 2007 | Snow Angels | Frank Marchand | |
| 2007 | Poor Boy's Game | Boxing Official | |
| 2007 | Just Buried | Pickles | |
| 2010 | Whirligig | Al | |
| 2011 | Hobo with a Shotgun | Drake | |
| 2012 | The Disappeared | Gerald | |
| 2013 | Copperhead | Preacher Taggart | |
| 2014 | Beethoven's Treasure Tail | Norman the Magician | |
| 2016 | The Healer | Henry | |

=== Television ===
| Year | Title | Role | Notes |
|---|---|---|---|
| 1979 | Up at Ours | Derek | TV mini series |
| 1982 | Joey | Captain Joe | TV movie |
| 1986 | The Beachcombers | Milo | |
| 1998 | Loyal Opposition: Terror in the White House | Ben Harrison | TV movie |
| 1996–2002 | Lexx | Stanley H. Tweedle | Main cast |
| 1997–1998 | Millennium | Medical Examiner, Mr. Dean | 3 episodes |
| 2003 | Shattered City: The Halifax Explosion | Capt. Horatio Brannen | 2 episodes |
| 2006 | Candles on Bay Street | Cee Jay | TV movie |
| 2007 | Sybil | Willard | TV movie |
| 2009 | G-Spot | Priest | 1 episode |
| 2010 | Haven | Sal Fortuna | 1 episode |
| 2014 | Lizzie Borden Took an Ax | Jury Foreman | TV movie |
| 2015 | The Lizzie Borden Chronicles | Jury Foreman | TV mini series |
| 2017 | Trailer Park Boys | Sonny | 2 episodes |
| 2017–2019 | Pure | Bishop Bergen | 7 episodes |
