= Treevenge =

- Film poster
- Directed by: Jason Eisener
- Written by: Rob Cotterill; Jason Eisener
- Produced by: Rob Cotterill
- Starring: Jonathan Torrens; Sarah E. Dunsworth; Lex Gigeroff
- Cinematography: Jeff Wheaton
- Edited by: Jason Eisener
- Music by: Darius Holbert; Austin Ince; Slasher Dave; Adam Burke; Fredrik Klingwald
- Production company: Yer Dead Productions
- Distributed by: Yer Dead Productions
- Release date: July 7, 2008 (Fantasia)
- Running time: 16 minutes
- Country: Canada

Treevenge is a 2008 Canadian Christmas horror short film written and directed by Jason Eisener, and produced by Yer Dead Productions. Shooting started in November 2007, and ended in February 2008. Post-production was completed in June 2008. The film stars Jonathan Torrens, Sarah E. Dunsworth, Lex Gigeroff, and Molly Dunsworth. The theme song to the film Cannibal Holocaust is played during the opening title.

== Plot ==
A group of men enter a snowy forest with various power tools and begin cutting down trees, some of which they burn and some that they package into trucks. The packaged trees are sent to facilities and lumped together to be sold as Christmas trees. The trees themselves are shown to be sentient and feeling everything that is being done to them, attempting to communicate in their language to the humans but being unable to. Several trees are separated from their families and taken by various humans, including a family of four, a man with the intention of having sex with the tree, a girl and her mother, and a woman who is being pressured for sex by her boyfriend. On Christmas Eve, the trees watch as the humans celebrate and ignore their pleadings, not realizing that the humans cannot hear them.

On Christmas Day, the young girl of the family is brutally grabbed and mauled to death by the tree, which launches a Christmas star into the throat of her father as her mother and brother scream in horror. Elsewhere, the mother and girl discover that their tree had decapitated their cat and are chased by the tree outside, where a crowd of trees attacks them. The woman and her boyfriend have their eyes violently removed by the branches, which are then forced through their mouths; the presumed sex offender has his leg severed with an axe. The trees attack the humans all over the world, killing several of them; a woman and her baby are separated and she is forced to watch as a tree jumps on the baby's head, crushing her skull and kills her. The trees proceed to drag the corpses behind them just as the humans had done.

== Cast ==
- Jonathan Torrens as Jim Macmichael
- Sarah E. Dunsworth as Cadence Macmichael
- Lex Gigeroff as the tree lot boss
- Molly Dunsworth as Molly Carpenter
- John Dunsworth and Cory Bowles as tree voices
- Jason Eisener as a lumberjack

== Accolades ==
- Audience Award for Best Short Film -- New York City Horror Film Festival
- Audience Award for Best Short Film -- Toronto After Dark Film Festival
- Audience Award for Best Short Film -- Fantasia Film Festival
- Best Editing -- Atlantic Film Festival
- Best Short Film -- Fantastic Fest Online
- Audience Award for Best Short Film -- San Francisco Independent Film Festival
- Best Short Film -- Rue Morgue Magazine
- Honorable Mention -- Sundance Film Festival
