= The Nature of Nicholas =

- Directed by: Jeff Erbach
- Written by: Jeff Erbach
- Produced by: Jeff Peeler; Len Pendergast
- Starring: Jeff Sutton; David Turnbull; Tom McCamus
- Cinematography: Brian Rougeau
- Edited by: K. George Godwin
- Production company: Full Stop Films
- Release dates: 24 August 2002 (Montréal Film Festival); 21 November 2003 (Canada)
- Running time: 97 minutes
- Country: Canada
- Language: English

The Nature of Nicholas is a 2002 Canadian coming-of-age drama film directed by Jeff Erbach, starring Jeff Sutton, David Turnbull and Tom McCamus.

== Cast ==
- Jeff Sutton as Nicholas
- David Turnbull as Bobby
- Tom McCamus as Father
- Ardith Boxall as Mother
- Robert Huculak as Roy
- Katherine Lee Raymond as Jenna
- Samantha Hill as Vicki

== Release ==
The film premiered at the Montreal World Film Festival on 24 August 2002.

== Reception ==
Dennis Harvey of Variety called the film "accomplished if not entirely satisfying". Ryan Cracknell of Film Threat wrote that the film "takes a more in-your-face approach where the transformation into adulthood is looked at with a combination of fear, curiosity and confusion." Ray Conlogue of The Globe and Mail rated the film 2.5 stars out of 4 and wrote that while the film "has its slow patches", and "expects more of his inexperienced lead actor than he can deliver", it is an "honest, and often moving, personal film".

Joe M. O'Connell of the Austin American-Statesman wrote that "what begins as a compelling coming-of-age story ends with a twisted crime scene of metaphor." Susan Walker of the Toronto Star wrote that while the film "exceedingly slow-paced film that veers wildly between documentary-style naturalism and total improbability."
