= Zixx =

- Genre: Sci-fi; Cyberpunk
- Created by: Jeffrey Hirschfield
- Developed by: Bonita Siegel
- Starring: Barbara Mamabolo; Jeffrey Hirschfield; Alex Hood (2004); Jamie Johnston (2004); Ephraim Ellis (2005–2009); Brenna O'Brien (2005–2009); Reece Thompson (2005–2009); T. Roy Kozuki (2008–2009)
- Country of origin: Canada
- No. of seasons: 3
- No. of episodes: 39

Production
- Production locations: Toronto, Ontario (Season 1); Vancouver, B.C. (Seasons 2-3)
- Production companies: The Nightingale Company; Rainmaker Entertainment

Original release
- Network: YTV
- Release: January 17, 2004 – August 31, 2009

Zixx (full title is Zixx: Level One for season one, Zixx: Level Two for season two, and Zixx: Level Three for season three) is a Canadian television series that aired on YTV. This series was developed by Savi Media and The Nightingale Company & Rainmaker Entertainment (formerly Mainframe Entertainment in seasons 1–2) with YTV Original Productions. The series was created by Jeff Hirschfield.

The show consists of a mixture of live-action real-world sequences interspersed with computer-generated scenes set inside a virtual realm. In Zixx Level One, Elliott Digital used the game engine LithTech to create the animation, the first time this had been done for a television show.

For Zixx: Level Two, the production had to move to British Columbia when Thunderbird Films Inc. joined the team. Mainframe Entertainment came on board to do the animation, and IDT Entertainment, the company that owns Mainframe, took over distribution of the show. It is the first-ever Mainframe series to combine live action with computer animation. The crew would stay for season three.

== Plot ==
Zixx is an Intergalactic Network ( "the Network" for short) agent who has crash-landed on Earth with her partner, Flanngo. As luck would have it, Earth also happens to be a hotbed of activity for the evil Onccalon and the Hargokk Empire. Zixx has no intention of letting him win, so she and Flanngo need to find a way to access the Network and make sure they can get to the next level of the Keep before Onccalon's henchmen do.

=== Level 1 ===
Zixx and Flanngo need to find a way into the Keep, a transdimensional antimatter field (a cyber dimension resembling a video game), the last legacy of the ancient Gaanth race, the leaders of the Network (reminiscent of Tron). The difference is that death is permanent if they die in the keep. Reluctantly accepting the help of Earthlings Adam and Griff, the four need to move fast and finish level one of the Keep; to do so they will need to recover the six fragments of a crystal that are scattered throughout the level. When the crystal is whole and combined with the crystal base, it shows the map to the three neuropods buried deep within the level that, when solved, show the path to the next level. They must accomplish all of this before Onccalon's henchman Deeth does.

=== Level 2 ===
Having made it to the shifting labyrinth of level 2, Zixx and Flanngo have gotten a nice inventory upgrade, but seem to have lost their pals Adam and Griff. Finding their new Earth location outside the Keep to be a quiet rural town called Glen River, they find themselves forming a new team composed of their new friends, Riley, Meghan, and Dwayne. Zixx needs to keep one step ahead of her foes. Unlike the previous level, level 2 changes layout randomly making it difficult to find locations again.

Zixx and her new team must find the key to the golden gate, the portal to the next level, but it is not easy because the gate also shifts around. They will need to hurry and beat various new agents of the Hargokk Empire. As well as finding out that Onccalon is still alive and regenerating, now they need Adam and Griff's help.

=== Level 3 ===
Zixx is thrilled when her team enters Level Three intact. The challenges of Level Three turn out to be far greater than those of the previous levels, requiring puzzle-solving to gain upgrades. Somewhere on this level in the Keep, Onccalon is growing ever stronger and is about to be resurrected. Only the most powerful weapon of all time can defeat Onccalon, and so the race is on to find the Sword of Gaanth, which is split into a hilt, a blade, and six Vortrian gems. If they fail, then the last remaining Gaanth who resides within the sword will destroy the entire universe before Onccalon can rule it. In the end, Onccalon is destroyed by Zixx using the Sword. As the Keep began dissolving in response, Zixx, Flanngo, and Tarphex depart to rejoin the Network while sending their human friends back to Earth with the promise of reuniting for future missions.

== Characters ==
- Barbara Mamabolo as Zixx Phunkee Zee : A smart tough Intergalactic Network agent from Halik-7 of the Aphex Galaxy. She's the last person you want to mess with; relentlessly determined, generous, resourceful and with an extremely dry sense of humour. She's a true hero and will do anything in her considerable power to defeat the Hargokk Empire. She is a stereotypical loner, reluctant to accept help from anyone. She carries the multi-purpose APUT Network tool, which was upgraded to a Gaanthean Proton Scanner in Level 2.
- Jeffrey Hirschfield as Flanngo: Zixx's investigative partner and mentor for several eons, he is a cynical, wise-cracking, thick-skinned detective from the same planet as Zixx. While Zixx is the brains of the pair, Flanngo is the brawn; he's fast, tenacious and, like Zixx, someone you don't want to mess with. He is surly and has the appearance of a theropod dinosaur. He tends not to use inventory or weapons other than shields, preferring his natural bodily abilities such as his tail. In level 1, Flanngo can't go outside of the Keep, except inside Zixx's backpack, because to Flanngo, Earth's atmosphere is extremely toxic and poisonous. However, in Level 2, Flanngo was accidentally ejected from the Keep in the form of a teenage boy in a dragon costume in "Nerds of a Feather".
- Onccalon: The leader of the Hargokk Empire. Years ago he was destroyed in a battle with the Network, but he survived. He is somewhere inside the Keep and has been regaining his power. His followers are devoted to resurrecting him and have engaged Zixx and her team in the Keep.

In Level 2 it was revealed that Onccalon is regenerating and is more than just a pile of space goo. He is getting stronger each day as the pieces of his remains find their way to him. He has spoken in Level 2 and in Level 3, his hand was shown in a sphere where he was regenerating. Also, he can sense and feed on fear. If Onccalon is resurrected then the universe is doomed.

=== Level 1 ===
- Jamie Johnston as Adam Frake: Bright and intuitive, 12-year-old Adam is an only child who has never known his father and lives with his uncle. His mother is an archaeologist who "disappeared" under mysterious circumstances, which Adam believes resulted from evil aliens kidnapping her. Despite being impulsive, stubborn, and volatile, he is a natural sleuth and more than capable of taking care of himself in the Keep. He and Griff were absent during season 2, however Adam made a brief appearance as a glowing ball of energy when he saved Zixx from Jayda and explained he and Griff hit a vortex when they reached Level 2. He supposedly made it home in the same episode. It is unknown if he will appear again to help Zixx or if Adam will ever find out the truth about his mother.
- Katie Hood as Griffin "Griff" Chalanchuk : A stereotypical "geek" who enjoys sci-fi and computer gaming as much as Adam, 12-year-old Griff is Adam's polar opposite in terms of personality, which also makes him the stereotypical "sidekick" character. He's level headed and cautious, patient and analytical, though he is known to be as stubborn as Adam. While he seems far too timid compared to Zixx and Adam, he has been known to show real courage and resourcefulness when it counts.
- Earl Pastko as Deeth: One of the evil aliens, the leader of the Hargokk contingent on Earth. He's the one who chases down Lew, steals the crystal from Adam, and generally makes things extremely difficult for Zixx and the gang. A dedicated servant of the dark overlord Onccalon, Deeth is rabidly determined to see his master rise again and the universe enslaved. He disguised himself as a school janitor when on Earth. He was killed by the final monster when he walked into the boss room on Level 1.
- Lew: A homeless man with serious mental instabilities. He seems to know more than he should, things that both Zixx and Deeth want to know. He is constantly on the run from his past, but becomes a frequent source of help and advice for Zixx and the others.
- Uncle Murray: Adam's uncle, a well-meaning man who doesn't have a clue how to raise children, who has been looking after Adam since Adam's mother disappeared. He tends to be bumbling and self-absorbed, but he genuinely cares about Adam and worries that he is in denial about his mother's "disappearance".
- Anna Frake: Adam's mother, a lively and dynamic archaeologist who disappeared without explanation. Adam believes that she was abducted by aliens, especially now that Zixx and Deeth have appeared. However, it is unknown what really happened to her (i.e., if she was "abducted by aliens", or if something more... "serious" happened to her). She has communicated twice to Adam, and only once has she been successful, having distracted Level One's final guardian to give an opening for Adam to defeat.
- Charlotte Arnold as Sarah Mills: An alien mercenary employed by the Hargokks to befriend Griff to locate the clubhouse where the crystal fragments and weapons are located. She later claims to be remorseful of her actions, showing them Deeth's weapons inventory. However, she was actually trying to locate the remaining fragments but the team was suspicious and Griff used Zixx's watch to condense her, turning Sarah into a pile of goo. If Zixx makes contact with the Network, then Sarah will be detained for her crimes.

=== Level 2 ===
- Ephraim Ellis as Riley Kiniston: A newcomer to the neighbourhood, 16-year-old Riley is quick, charismatic and daring. He tends to overlook crucial details and tends to be suspicious about things concerning Zixx. A natural in the Keep, his hand–eye coordination and his ability to make intuitive connections make him invaluable as the ultimate non-linear problem solver. Raised by a single mom, Riley is embarrassed by his father, a devotee of a flaky group who believes they're in contact with aliens. In Level 3, his Keep form is empowered with superstrength.
- Brenna O'Brien as Megan: Riley's 13-year-old cousin, a sensible and incredibly bright girl who is witty and perceptive. She is calm and takes a more calculated approach to problem solving and a brilliant tactician. Although her jokes sometimes confuse Zixx, she and Zixx have a warm appreciation for each other. She has a different understanding of Flanngo than the boys, and even glimpses the soft side that exists in spite his curmudgeonly personality. In Level 3, her Keep form gains a jetpack.
- Reece Thompson as Dwayne Welland: Thirteen-year-old Dwayne is Meghan's geeky pal and a science-technology wiz. He ignores all criticism and is rather thick headed, diving head first into any situation without realizing the real danger. While he only seems to inspire annoyance (especially in Riley and Flanngo), he has proven to be as valuable as Riley and Meghan. Near the end of Level 2, Dwayne became to Key to exiting Level 2, making his Keep form golden. In Level 3, he gain a multi-use tool that enables him to translate the languages of other beings.
- Agam Darshi as Jayda: Disguised as a cool, sardonic 18-year-old juice-bar girl, matching wits and weapons against Zixx and her team, she's the toughest opponent Zixx has ever faced. Brilliant, manipulative and resourceful, Jayda is also utterly ruthless and can also sing. She was trapped in the center of Level 2 after she destroyed Sirenelle during the final test and became the guardian of level two.
- Michael Eklund as Earl: A heavy metal listening mullethead with very bad taste in cars, Earl works for the enemy (while attempting to relive his teen years). He's a complete idiot with a bad temper, but he's still someone Zixx and company need to keep an eye on. He also has a pet monster called Dickenson, which can turn into a dog. Markko froze both in the Keep to try to gain Riley's trust. He made his last appearance on Boegarian Chess set with Dickenson but was knocked off and Dickenson was frozen and smashed.
- Tyler Johnston as Markko Killborn: A shapeshifter who works for the Hargokk Empire. He was a friend of Riley, but when they met in the Keep Markko showed his ability to shapeshift and tried to undermine the team. Markko was eventually flattened by Jayda's psychic powers due to his failures. He suddenly appeared at the Boegarian chess set as Zixx but was cast out into oblivion.
- Mr. Brown: The local librarian, he's really old, really wise and he keeps giving Zixx and the gang clues. Mr. Brown turns out to be greatest adventurers the world has ever known: The Archaeologist. He promised Zixx he would locate the Gand's book,
- Chris Gauthier as Narnapharn Verg: An alien that found Zixx using a communicator device by locating the high Keep activity on Earth. He arrived in a "one-man Bubble Ship" and seemingly lived in a dumpster beside a portal until Zixx came through. He is a stereotypical fanboy, changing his Keep-venturing alien as his idol. Unfortunately, he likes to trap his heroes inside the Keep by sealing the portal with his device so that he can watch them forever in action. Jayda wants to destroy him after he trapped her for eons, doing various cruel acts to him in vengeance. He was first imprisoned in a card but was later released. Zixx recently sent him to an alien rehabilitation clinic to cure his fanaticism and protect him from Jayda.
- Tiffany Lyndall-Knight as Sirenella : An entity who appears as a shimmery spirit or an apparition who possesses Meghan and other people's bodies. Her allegiances are unknown. She is the guardian – or "boss" – of Level Two. During battles she acts exactly like a supercomputer because she is the physical manifestation of Deep Crimson, a supposedly undefeatable program designed to play Bognorian Chess against living opponents (inspired by the real world chess supercomputer Deep Blue). However, she couldn't compete with chaos and was knocked off the set by Jayda who unwillingly took her place as the guardian of the Golden Gate. As she fell into emptiness, Sirenella shouted she was finally free.

=== Level 3 ===
- Peter Abrams as Dewey Welland: Dwayne's father and owner of an electronics store. He is very cheery and hopes to win a local robotics competition, which he achieves between episodes 8 and 9 of Level Three. Knowledgeable about technology, he displays great interest in Zixx's intellect.
- Tammy Hui and Spencer Maybee as Magda and Thar: Onccalon's henchmen on Level 3, a duo of fraternal twin siblings. Magda, the older twin, has the appearance of an Asian girl and is able to jam inventory and cause electronic equipment to go haywire. Thar, the younger twin, appears on Earth as various small animals and can possess anyone unless surrounded by enemies. Their form in the Keep allows them to merge into one being. On Earth, they can leave an intangible, invisible slime that can only be detected by Zixx's Ocuscope. One of their weaknesses is getting wet, which causes them to become a blob of goo.
- Lance Champion: A member of a race of beings who are said to have an elixir that can grant instant courage. Lance was a spokesperson on Earth who was criticized as a failure by Zixx's team, although Flaango thinks highly of him. However, it turns out that there is no elixir, merely a lie to keep their homeworld safe. In the Keep, he has the appearance of a small bat.
- T. Roy Kozuki as Tarphex Suki-Tee: One of Zixx's oldest and closest friends. He managed to find a backdoor to Level 3 after learning of Zixx's disappearance. He strongly disagrees with Zixx's alliance with humans but soon began to trust them. He has a device that can alter memories. Later on, he is discovered to be allied with Onccalon and then betrayed him and join back on Zixx team again.
- Britt McKillip as Amy: The annoying daughter of Meghan's mother's best friend. She is obsessed with shopping and is a very big klutz. When she "accidentally" breaks Tarphex's communicator beyond repair, the team wonders if there is more to her than meets the eye. The Vortrium gem that illuminated hidden things, like inner desires, revealed Amy's desire to become Riley's girlfriend. She accidentally fell into the Keep, though Tarphex later erased her memory.
- Michael Eklund as Merle: Earl's twin brother, who is a sales clerk in Glen River Mall selling cell phones. Though he isn't working for Onccalon, he captures Zixx, Tarphex and Riley and traps them in his van, using interdimensional technology in an attempt to send them into a black hole to avenge his brother's death. However, they return to their dimension by hotwiring his car, just as Dwayne stole his keys. They then incapacitate him and then alter his memory so that he'd take his van straight to an institute that hates loud noise.

== Production ==
The first season was produced by The Nightingale Company, Savi Media and Megafun Productions. It was shot in Toronto between October 25 and December 18, 2002. Elliott Digital handled the animation, utilizing the LithTech video game engine. In January 2005, Thunderbird Films and Mainframe Entertainment co-acquired distribution rights, with both joining production on the second season alongside The Nightingale Company and Savi Media. Thunderbird would handle filming, which was set to start in Langley in February, while Mainframe would produce the animation. In April 2007, Thunderbird announced that the third season had finished filming, with an expected broadcast in summer 2008.

== Episodes ==
=== Level One (2004) ===
1. "Phunkee Zee" (January 17, 2004)
2. "In For a Penny" (January 24, 2004)
3. "Parched" (January 31, 2004)
4. "Plant Life" (February 7, 2004)
5. "The Key Ring" (February 21, 2004)
6. "Anna" (February 28, 2004)
7. "Symbiosis" (March 6, 2004)
8. "Stuck on You" (March 13, 2004)
9. "Four's A Crowd" (March 20, 2004)
10. "Losing Griff" (March 27, 2004)
11. "Larry" (April 3, 2004)
12. "Revenge is Sweet" (April 10, 2004)
13. "Boss Monster" (April 17, 2004)

=== Level Two (2005) ===
1. "Welcome to The Funhouse" (September 7, 2005)
2. "Dwayne's World" (September 14, 2005)
3. "Trust No One" (September 21, 2005)
4. "Now You See Him, Now You Don't" (September 28, 2005)
5. "Lost Pets" (October 5, 2005)
6. "Walk Like An Egyptian" (October 12, 2005)
7. "Nerds of a Feather" (October 19, 2005)
8. "Spin Cycle" (November 2, 2005)
9. "Beware the Man Eating Chicken" (November 9, 2005)
10. "The Rod of Lethor" (November 16, 2005)
11. "The Key" (November 23, 2005)
12. "Deal with the Devil" (November 30, 2005)
13. "Guardian of Level Three" (December 7, 2005)

=== Level Three (2009) ===
1. "Oncallon's on Switch" (January 10, 2009)
2. "No Man Is An Island" (January 17, 2009)
3. "The Only Thing To Fear" (January 24, 2009)
4. "Old Friends" (January 31, 2009)
5. "Who's That Girl?" (February 7, 2009)
6. "Riley's Bad Date" (February 14, 2009)
7. "My Name Isn't Earl" (February 21, 2009)
8. "When Good Robots Go Bad" (February 28, 2009)
9. "Gift Horse" (March 8, 2009)
10. "While the Iron Is Hot" (March 15, 2009)
11. "The 'I' in Team" (March 22, 2009)
12. "Then There Were Five" (March 29, 2009)
13. "The Fate of the Universe" (April 5, 2009)

== See also ==
- ReBoot: The Guardian Code
- Superhuman Samurai Syber Squad
- Code Lyoko
- Mighty Morphin Power Rangers
