= Louise Wischermann =

Brazilian actress

- Born: Luise Wischermann; February 25, 1974 (age 51); Salvador, Brazil
- Citizenship: Brazil, Germany
- Occupation: Actress
- Years active: 1986—present
- Children: 1

Louise Wischermann (born February 25, 1974) is a Brazilian-German former actress, best known for her role as Lyekka in the science-fiction television series Lexx.

Louise Wischermann was born in Salvador, Brazil, on 25 February 1974. At the age of 18, she moved to Germany to study at the Gmelin München acting studio and then went on to act professionally. She is best known for her role as Lyekka, a flesh-eating plant in human form, in the science fiction television series Lexx. Since giving up acting she has explored several business ventures.

Wischermann spends most of her time in Toronto. She enjoys such activities as skydiving, hang gliding, swimming, horse riding and volleyball. She is fluent in English, Portuguese and Spanish and speaks some German. Her favorite music genres are jazz and percussion. In 2005, she was diagnosed with multiple sclerosis.

== Filmography ==
- 1986–1989: Xou Da Xuxa (Pituxa)
- 1991: Filhos do Sol
- 1992: Marienhof
- 1998: Mallorca – Suche nach dem Paradies (Carmen Diaz)
- 1998-2001: Lexx (Lyekka, Lulu)
- 2000: Aquarela do Brasil
- 2000: Die Wache
- 2002: O Redentor
- 2002: This is Hollywood/Everything About Entertainment
- 2002: Luca's World Travel Show
