= Up at Ours =

Canadian television comedy-drama series

Up at Ours is a Canadian television comedy-drama series, which aired in 1980 on CBC Television. The series starred Mary Walsh as Mrs. Ball, the owner of a boarding house in St. John's, Newfoundland and Labrador, which served as a frame for an anthology of comedic and dramatic stories involving various temporary guests or permanent residents of the house.

The cast also included Gordon Pinsent, Janis Spence, Ray Guy, Kevin Noble, Rick Boland and Brian Downey. The series was created by Pinsent.

Twelve episodes of the series were produced.
