= Paul Donovan (writer) =

Canadian television and film writer, director and producer

Paul Donovan is a Canadian television and film writer, director and producer best known as the creator of the science-fiction TV series LEXX. He co-founded Salter Street Films (SSF) with his brother Michael Donovan.

== Biography ==
Donovan was born in Canada on June 26, 1954. He grew up interested in science and film, and earned a B.Sc. in Physics from Dalhousie University, and graduated from London Film School. In 2009 he was awarded an honorary doctorate of Law from Dalhousie. The IMDb credits South Pacific 1942 as the first film he directed, and in 1981 the Donovan brothers founded Salter Street Films, a television and film production company based in Halifax, Nova Scotia. Salter Street Films was named after the street in Halifax where Michael and Paul had been living.

== Salter Street Films ==
Salter Street Film's debut was Siege, distributed by Manson International around the world. Following this success, the company produced Def-Con 4 (1985), which was distributed theatrically around the US by New World Entertainment and George's Island (1989), which received world-wide distribution. Buried on Sunday (1992) and Paint Cans (1994) were the next films produced. They also started the production of a film titled Normanicus, later taken over by Toronto producer Peter Simpson. The distributor's title change to Norman's Awesome Experience made the unique time travel comedy, in which language barrier is fundamental to the story, sound like a knockoff of Bill & Ted's Excellent Adventure, as both films were released in 1989. The company's later success was built on the science fiction series Lexx, sold to Showtime and SyFy in the US and also was a hit in Germany, Russia and Eastern Europe. This Canadian-German co-production went on to become a lucrative money-maker through international sales and was one of the first shows to develop a cult following almost exclusively through the Internet. Fans of Lexx nicknamed Donovan and the show's other main writers, Lex Gigeroff and Jeffrey Hirschfield, "The Supreme Beans".

Concurrently, the Donovan brothers found success with the satirical This Hour Has 22 Minutes becoming a hit on CBC as well as other series such as CODCO, Emily of New Moon, Made in Canada, Blackfly, the children's series Pirates and the special Rick Mercer's Talking To Americans. These shows found homes on the CBC as well as other Canadian networks and cable channels. Salter Street also created the Stop motion children's show Poko.

Based on their reputation for political satire, American documentary film-maker Michael Moore approached Salter Street to produce his Bowling for Columbine project. Michael Donovan agreed, and arranged financing in Canada and Germany. The documentary won both the Anniversary Prize at Cannes and the Oscar for Best Documentary Feature.

In 2000, a year after the Donovan brothers had taken the company public, Salter Street Films was awarded the broadcast licence for the Independent Film Channel Canada by the CRTC. This potentially lucrative award, combined with SSF's reputation as a content-provider, attracted interest from the powerful media corporation Alliance Atlantis. Alliance Atlantis bought Salter Street from the majority shareholders the following year. Paul and Michael Donovan remained on as producers. In 2003, two years after the purchase, Alliance Atlantis closed the operation, transferring Salter Street's ongoing television productions to Alliance. Michael Donovan has formed the Halifax Film Company with many of the former Salter Street employees.

== Later career ==
Paul Donovan has continued as an independent producer and director. In 2006, he created a new Canadian miniseries, a period political drama called The Conclave set in the 15th century, released in 2018 on Amazon Prime. The show stars Brian Blessed and features former Lexx star Brian Downey as a scheming monk. Downey has been a regular in Donovan's work since the 1980s, dating back at least to George's Island in 1989. In 2010, Paul wrote and directed "Blissestrasse", a low-budget feature set in Berlin, and from 2013 to 2017 Paul produced, wrote and directed "Clay's P.O.V.", a comedy travel POV series shot in Europe.
