= George's Island (film) =

- Directed by: Paul Donovan
- Screenplay by: Maura O'Connell; Paul Donovan
- Produced by: Paul Donovan; Bob Hicks; Lorenzo P. Lampthwait; Maura O'Connell; J. William Ritchie; Stefan Wodoslawsky
- Starring: Ian Bannen; Sheila McCarthy; Maury Chaykin; Nathaniel Moreau; Vickie Ridler
- Cinematography: Les Krizsan
- Edited by: Stephan Fanfara
- Music by: Marty Simon
- Production companies: National Film Board of Canada; Salter Street Films
- Distributed by: Astral Films
- Release date: July 21, 1989
- Running time: 89 minutes
- Country: Canada
- Language: English

George's Island is a Canadian drama film. It was shot in and around Halifax, Nova Scotia.

== Plot ==
Ten-year-old George (Nathaniel Moreau) lives in a dilapidated home near the Halifax Harbour with his grandfather Captain Waters (Ian Bannen). Captain Waters is a wheelchair-using former sailor. He is fond of telling George ghost stories. He volunteers an old story about the time he saw Captain Kidd's ghost out in Halifax Harbour. When George learns in school about Kidd's supposed buried treasure out on nearby George's Island, he volunteers the story, and is punished by nosy school teacher Miss Birdwood (Sheila McCarthy). Miss Birdwood believes that the root of George's outburst is "trouble at home." She launches her own sneaky investigation to find out the truth. When she discovers that Captain Waters has a fondness for grog, she reports the family to Mr. Droonfield (Maury Chaykin) at Child Services. While Mr. Droonfield determines a course of action, George is temporarily placed with a foster family, the Beanes (portrayed by Brian Downey and Irene Hogan) who keep him locked up in a basement cell. On Halloween night, George and the Beanes' other adoptee, Bonnie (Vickie Ridler), escape with Captain Waters and head for safety on George's Island. Miss Birdwood and Mr. Droonfield give chase, but they accidentally awaken the ghosts of Captain Kidd (Gary Reineke) and his men, who think that the intruders are after their chest of gold.

== Cast ==
- Ian Bannen as Captain Waters
- Sheila McCarthy as Miss Birdwood
- Maury Chaykin as Mr. Droonfield
- Nathaniel Moreau as George Waters
- Vickie Ridler as Bonnie
- Brian Downey as Mr. Beane
- Irene Hogan as Mrs. Beane
- Gary Reineke as Captain Kidd

== Inspiration ==
George's Island is an actual island in the Halifax Harbour. Local maritime folklore holds tales of pirates seeking revenge over buried treasure stolen from the island. These tales inspired the script for the film.

== Reception ==
Upon its release, the film went relatively unnoticed. It was overshadowed by films with larger production and advertising budgets. It was only shown in Canadian theatres for three weeks.

George's Island was judged the best live-action film at the 1990 Chicago International Festival of Children's Films.

Currently, there are no critical reviews of the film on Rotten Tomatoes.
