= Sci-Fi on the Rock =

Annual science fiction festival in Newfoundland, Canada

- Locations: St. John's, Newfoundland and Labrador, Canada
- Inaugurated: 2007
- Most recent: 2025
- Website: scifiontherock.com

Sci-Fi on the Rock is an annual science fiction festival held in St. John's, Newfoundland, Canada. It was co-founded by Darren Hann and Melanie Collins and held its first festival in 2007 in Mount Pearl before moving to St. John's. Many of the festival's attendees engage in cosplay. Celebrities that have attended the festival include Nicole de Boer, Terry Farrell, Robert Picardo, and Eugene Simon.
