= A Switch in Time =

- Original poster art
- Directed by: Paul Donovan
- Written by: Paul Donovan
- Produced by: Paul Donovan; Peter R. Simpson
- Starring: Tom McCamus; Lori Paton; Jacques Lussier; David Hemblen
- Narrated by: Tom McCamus
- Cinematography: Vic Sarin
- Edited by: Stefan Fanfara
- Music by: Paul Zaza
- Production companies: Simcom/Norstar Entertainment; Salter Street Films
- Distributed by: Norstar Home Video (Canada); South Gate Entertainment (U.S.)
- Release date: November 3, 1988 (Canada)
- Running time: 90 minutes
- Country: Canada
- Languages: English; Latin; French; Italian
- Budget: CAD$5 million

A Switch in Time is a 1988 Canadian science-fiction comedy film written and directed by Paul Donovan, starring Tom McCamus, Lori Paton, Jacques Lussier and David Hemblen. It follows Norman, Umberto and Erica, a trio of accidental time travelers who attempt to rebuild their life in early Christian times during the Roman Empire's invasion of Helvetic lands.

The film had a troubled production and only received a spotty release. Its belated U.S. home video version was re-titled Norman's Awesome Experience by distributor South Gate Entertainment to ride on the success of Bill and Ted's Excellent Adventure, a film it actually predates.

== Plot ==
Norman (Tom McCamus) is a nebbish junior scientist working at CERN in modern-day Geneva. His life takes a whole new turn when an attractive Canadian model named Erica (Lori Paton) and her Italian photographer boyfriend Umberto (Jacques Lussier) persuade him to allow them access to the plant for an Omni photo shoot. The next day, the three central characters are literally zapped back in time by a freak accident at the nuclear power plant in which none of them was an active participant. The three of them find themselves in an open field in the distant past at the exact spot where the nuclear power plant from the 20th century was. Their presence was not known to the scientists nearby, and time-travel was not the intent of the experiment at the nuclear facility. Therefore, Norman and his two friends are completely unable to return to their own time and they do not even bother seeking an attempt to get back, nor do they concern themselves with the possibility of changing history.

The area is about to be annexed by the Roman Empire at the time the protagonists arrive (during the reign of the Emperor Nero). The Roman soldiers who capture Norman, Erica, and Umberto actually speak Latin (presented with English subtitles). Only Umberto can speak Latin and is therefore able to effectively communicate and function in the society. The three are taken to a small village where several dozen local Gallic people native to the area live. But most of them speak a primitive tongue requiring Norman to communicate in gestures.

In addition to learning the ability to converse in Latin, Norman has a rudimentary technical understanding of many modern devices and is able to use his knowledge to actively alter history. Norman and the others stage a revolt and defeat the Roman soldiers garrisoning the village. But weeks later, a massive Roman army arrives to destroy the rebelling village in accordance with the Roman laws that all persons partaking in a revolt against the Roman Empire are to be put to death. Seeing to save themselves, Erica and Umberto attempt to flee only to be captured by the Romans. To save their own lives, the model and photographer become collaborators with the Romans to help put down the revolt that Norman has now taken over as the village's de facto leader, with the villagers naming him "Caesar Normanicus".

The Roman Army launches a massive attack against the village, but Norman and most of the villagers manage to escape by using hot air balloons. This activity is witnessed by the Roman commanding officer and the images of the balloons makes it into a book that Umberto and Erica are forced to help manufacture on a primitive printing press operated by a group of galley slaves of which they are now a part, having been sold into slavery due to their failure to stop Norman. The villagers settle on a coastal area of Gaul safe from the Romans; Norman names the region Normandy and lives out the rest of his life with his new people in prosperity, and thus seals his name in History, while Erica and Umberto live out the rest of their lives as slaves.

== Cast ==
- Tom McCamus as Norman
- Laurie Paton as Erica
- Jacques Lussier as Umberto
- David Hemblen as Septimus Fabius
- Lee Broker as Marcus Titanus
- Marcos Woinsky as Serpicus
- Gabriela Salas as Felix
- Brian Downey as Dr. Nobbelmeyer
- Armando Capo as Blacksmith
- Enrique Latorre as Emperor Nero
- Jorge Luis Estrella as High Priest
- Jacques Arndt as Administrator

== Production ==
=== Development and principal photography ===
A Switch in Time was a co-production between brothers Paul and Michael Donovan's Salter Street Films of Halifax, and Simcom of Toronto (which changed its name to Norstar Entertainment during the making of the film). It was stage actor Tom McCamus' feature film debut. He was advised to audition by his agent and won the part without much trying, jokingly positing that his performance may have been a good fit for the role of a lackadaisical scientist. Announced under the title Normanicus, it was originally slated to start filming in May 1986. By February 1986, the budget was projected at US$3.5 million, but no filming location had yet been determined. The Donovans ultimately settled on a November 1986 start date, with filming taking place in Argentina.

In all, the North American crew was scheduled to spend thirteen weeks in the South American country. The Roman costumes were imported from Italy, and the Helvetic village was built specifically for the movie, as were some of the more complex props like catapults. Production services were provided by local company Fata Morgana, headed by Alejandro Azzaro, who had previous experience working on outsourced foreign pictures. During production, the budget was pegged between US$2 and 3 million.

Principal photography eventually began in December 1986 and extended into January 1987. The bulk of the film was shot at Lanín National Park near San Martín de los Andes, as the Patagonian region could pass for the Swiss Alps without the high cost, and the local skiing industry provided the hospitality infrastructures needed by the production team. The Roman cavalry was played by a mounted regiment of the Argentinian army. The scenes representing modern day Geneva were shot in the Buenos Aires neighborhood of Recoleta.

=== Post-production and reshoots ===
During post-production, Salter Street ran out of money. The film's completion guarantor received scam complaints, but Paul Donovan argued that bribes extorted by the Argentinian customs administration were the main culprit for their financial situation. At any rate, the Donovans were bought out by their partner Simcom. While the original director maintained that Normanicus was headed in the right direction, Simcom's Ron Oliver, who was tasked with bringing the film to the finish line, thought the delivered footage was disjointed and could not be cut as is. As he was known to do, Simcom owner Peter Simpson called for reshoots.

According to Oliver, Donovan initially agreed to collaborate on the new material, but the discarding of much of the film's dark satire in favor of the heavier-handed comedy demanded by Simpson led him to depart the project, at one point attempting to dissuade the actors from taking part in the additional sessions. For his part, Donovan contended that he had been forcibly removed from the director's chair. Oliver ended up directing five days' worth of new material in Toronto, which changed about twenty minutes of the picture. According to one source, filming was completed in June 1987. As of July 1987, the film's budget was estimated at CAD$5 million (about US$3.8 million), and no release date had been set. By the end of 1987, it had been retitled A Switch in Time by Simcom.

Neither side expressed satisfaction with the finished product. By the time of its domestic release, Donovan had publicly distanced himself from the project. Simpson, who had a surly reputation, retorted: "Donovan fucked up, what can I say?" Oliver estimated that the film had lost his employer in the neighborhood of US$1 million.

== Release ==
=== Advance screenings ===
The film was screened for industry professionals as A Switch in Time at the MIFED (Mercato internazionale del film e del documentario) in Milan, Italy, on October 28 and November 2, 1987. It was also announced to be shown at the May 11–23, 1988 Cannes Film Market. It was selected for the 8th Atlantic Film and Video Festival, which took place from October 11 to October 16, 1988, in the director's hometown of Halifax, Nova Scotia.

=== General release ===
The film was released in Australia on home video in the week of May 5, 1988, by Palace Entertainment. In its native Canada, it premiered on premium cable channel First Choice on November 3, 1988. In the U.K., the film was released by CBS/Fox Video in June 1989. On all three of these occasions, it was titled A Switch in Time.

In the United States, The Samuel Goldwyn Company, with whom Simcom had a working relationship, was approached to buy theatrical rights, but they passed. The Canadian outfit hoped to make a deal with another distributor at the Cannes Film Market for a tentative August 1988 release date, to no avail. In early 1989, the film—still sold as A Switch in Time—had not yet found a distributor. It was eventually released direct-to-video by South Gate Entertainment on October 5, 1989. The company re-titled it Norman's Awesome Experience to ride on the popularity of Bill and Ted's Excellent Adventure, another time travel comedy. To go with the new moniker, South Gate peppered its ad copy and trailer with teen speak such as "like", "dude" and "totally rad", while touting a youth-oriented promotional campaign on Viacom's MTV, VH1 and CBS. Donovan conceded that the marketing scheme was "relatively clever", but lamented its misrepresentation of the film.

The Canadian tape of the film was delayed until after the U.S. release, arriving in November 1989. It was distributed by Norstar Entertainment's (previously Simcom) sister company Norstar Home Video, but was actually a localized version of South Gate Entertainment's U.S. edition, retaining much of its visual layout and the title of Norman's Awesome Experience.

== Reception ==
Writing for trade publication Variety upon the film's U.S. release, the reviewer identified as Lor. called the film an "entertaining time travel feature", noting that it was "nicely filmed in Argentinian locations" and that "the cast [did] a fine job". He also credited the soundtrack for its inclusion of licensed "golden oldies". However, he found the visual effects "modest" and deemed that the film's single jump to the past caused it to "lack variety" compared to works that featured a time hopping premise. In Hollywood en Don Torcuato, his Spanish-language opus about international films shot in Argentina, journalist Andrés Fevrier deemed the picture "quite good and a little crazy".

== Soundtrack ==
In addition to an original score by Canadian composer Paul Zaza, the film features several classic rock 'n' roll songs: "Hey Good Lookin'" by Hank Williams, "Only the Lonely (Know the Way I Feel)" by Roy Orbison and "Runaround Sue" by Dion DiMucci.
