= Buried on Sunday =

1992 Canadian film

- DVD cover
- Directed by: Paul Donovan
- Written by: Paul Donovan; William Fleming
- Produced by: Suzanne Colvin; William Fleming
- Starring: Paul Gross; Denise Virieux; Henry Czerny
- Cinematography: Les Krizsan
- Edited by: Stephan Fanfara
- Music by: Marty Simon
- Production company: Salter Street Films
- Distributed by: Alliance Communications
- Release date: September 18, 1992
- Running time: 94 min.
- Country: Canada
- Language: English

Buried on Sunday is a Canadian comedy film, released in 1992. Also known as Northern Extremes, it was directed by Paul Donovan, and written by Donovan and Bill Fleming.

The film stars Paul Gross as Augustus Knickel, the mayor of Solomon Gundy, a fictional island off the coast of Nova Scotia; the island name and film title are taken from a nursery rhyme.

The community is in an economic crisis due to the cod fishing moratorium, but finds its fortunes transformed when an AWOL Russian nuclear submarine surfaces at the island. With only four remaining crewmen, including the former missile programming officer-turned-prisoner (Tommy Sexton) on board, Knickel buys the submarine, discovers a cache of tactical missiles, and subsequently declares the island an independent nuclear power.

The film's cast also includes Mary Walsh, Maury Chaykin, Henry Czerny, Michael Gencher, Andy Jones, Louis Del Grande, and John Dunsworth. It also includes a cameo appearance by Harvey Kirck as a newscaster.

It was nominated for the 1992 Genie award for Best Original Screenplay.
