= List of Lexx episodes =

Lexx originally aired on Citytv from April 18, 1997, to April 26, 2002. Over the series run, 61 episodes aired, with the first four being 90-minute TV movies and the remainder being 45-minute television episodes.

== Series overview ==
Season	Episodes	Originally released	
Season	Episodes	First released	Last released
1	4	April 18, 1997	September 11, 1997
2	20	December 11, 1998	April 23, 1999
3	13	February 6, 2000	April 30, 2000
4	24	July 13, 2001	April 26, 2002

== Summary ==
Season One debuted in Canada on April 18, 1997, on Citytv and consists of four two-hour TV movies (sometimes screened as eight one-hour episodes) following the crew of the Lexx as they escape from the Cluster and encounter planets. When Sci Fi obtained the rights to broadcast the series in the United States, it changed the title to Tales from a Parallel Universe. Some episode guides do not list the two-hour movies as a season but list the subsequent seasons as the first through third.

Season Two debuted in Canada on December 11, 1998, on Space and consists of twenty forty-five-minute episodes with a story arc concerning the evil scientist Mantrid who tries to convert all matter in the Light Zone into one-armed drones. Mantrid largely succeeds before he is defeated by the crew of the Lexx, but not without causing a Big Crunch that results in sending the Lexx through a singularity to the Dark Zone.

Season Three debuted in the United Kingdom on February 6, 2000, on the British Sci-Fi Channel, and consists of thirteen episodes in which the Lexx is trapped in orbit around the warring planets Fire and Water, and the crew encounters an enigmatic, cheerful, and evil being known as Prince. The two planets share an orbit and atmosphere, allowing the inhabitants to pass freely between them. Fire is the afterlife for all evil souls, the inhabitants of which are continually engaged in attacks on Water, which is the afterlife of all good souls. The rulers of Fire are Prince and Duke, who both reincarnate whenever it suits them. Water has no ruler and contains a small population of hedonists on floating islands.

Season Four debuted in the USA on July 13, 2001, on the Sci-Fi Channel, and consists of twenty four episodes in which the Lexx arrives at Earth in the early 2000s, only to find that Prince (now named Isambard Prince and head of the ATF) and several other old adversaries have arrived there as well. Under the control of different individuals, the Lexx destroys large chunks of Earth and the Solar System before the final episode, televised on April 26, 2002.

== Episodes ==
=== Season 1 (1997) ===
No. overall	No. in season	Title	Directed by	Written by	Original release date
1	1	"I Worship His Shadow"	Paul Donovan	Paul Donovan w/ Jeffrey Hirschfield & Lex Gigeroff	April 18, 1997
His Divine Shadow rules the Light Zone with dark powers and an impenetrable bureaucracy. As fate would have it, four unlikely heroes are thrown together to wreak havoc on the Cluster: Stanley H. Tweedle, a bumbling Class 4 Security Guard; Zev, a strong willed but hideously ugly orphan transformed into a sexy love-slave; Kai, a poet-warrior transformed into an empty headed assassin by His Divine Shadow; and 790, a Zev-obsessed robot head. Thodin, the leader of the Ostral-B heretics is played by guest star Barry Bostwick.
2	2	"Super Nova"	Ron Oliver	Paul Donovan w/ Jeffrey Hirschfield & Lex Gigeroff	April 25, 1997
In the hopes of extending Kai's un-life, Zev decides they should go to Brunnis, the original homeworld of the Brunnen-G. The only thing they find when they get there are holographic messages left by the "Poet Man" (played by guest star Tim Curry). Meanwhile, Giggerota forms a deal with the Divine Predecessors to betray the crew of the Lexx. The sun of Brunnis begins to go supernova as the Brunnen-G stabilizers are deactivated, but the sun and its orbiting blue star speak to Kai and Zev, while the Time Prophet speaks to Stan through a recording, helping them regain control of the Lexx. A moth strands Giggerota on top of one of the stabilizer towers (in punishment for her eating part of it), and she dies in the explosion of the sun as the Lexx flies to safety.
3	3	"Eating Pattern"	Rainer Matsutani	Lex Gigeroff, Jeffrey Hirschfield & Paul Donovan	September 4, 1997
Out of energy, the Lexx is forced to land on a planet to replenish its energy supply. Zev and Stan bury the apparently dead Kai, before they discover an outpost occupied by lunatics led by the manic Bog (played by guest star Rutger Hauer).
4	4	"Giga Shadow"	Robert Sigl	Jeffrey Hirschfield, Paul Donovan & Lex Gigeroff	September 11, 1997
To resupply the protoblood that sustains Kai's life, the crew of the Lexx travel back to the Cluster but find the planet deserted. The population was killed in "The Cleansing", in preparation of the birth of the Giga Shadow, the last survivor of the insect wars and sworn enemy of humanity. The crew try to destroy the Giga Shadow with the help of Yottskry (played by guest star Malcolm McDowell), a defecting priest of the Divine Order.

=== Season 2 (1998–99) ===
No. overall	No. in season	Title	Directed by	Written by	Original release date
5	1	"Mantrid"	Christoph Schrewe	Paul Donovan	December 11, 1998
Kai, possessed by His Divine Shadow, leads the crew back to the Light Zone to retrieve an insect larva from the remains of the cluster. The crew then goes to meet Mantrid, former Supreme Biovizier for The Divine Order, to convince him to extract protoblood from the insect larva. The ageing Mantrid plans to use the insect's transference organ to transfer himself into a new machine body. Mantrid's besotted assistant transfers Mantrid's essence from his dying body to the machine body. The crew flees to Lexx and attempts to destroy it, but Mantrid's machine escapes.
6	2	"Terminal"	Srinivas Krishna	Jeffrey Hirschfield	December 18, 1998
Kai is awoken incorrectly, and punctures Stan's heart. After transferring the Key to Zev, they seek assistance at the MedStat, a large medical space hospital. The threat of the Lexx's power encourages the medical staff to help, but it emerges that they wish to take the Lexx and use it for their own ends. This is the last episode to feature Zev.
7	3	"Lyekka"	Stephan Wagner	Lex Gigeroff & Paul Donovan	December 25, 1998
The plant-based organism called Lyekka arrives on the Lexx and uses Stanley's dream image of a high school sweetheart to take form. At the same time, 3 astronauts from the planet Potataho run into the Lexx. Lyekka begins to eat them one at a time, allowing them to live out their wildest fantasies before consuming them. After accidentally destroying the astronaut's spaceship Stan offers to take them back to their planet, only to find it destroyed by Drone Arms. First appearance of Xev.
8	4	"Luvliner"	Stefan Ronowicz	Jeffrey Hirschfield & Paul Donovan	January 1, 1999
The crew travel to a space brothel, Luvliner. Negotiations break down when Schlemmi, who manages the brothel and has a fetish for robot heads, finds out that the crew has no money. After a little coercion they are allowed in free of charge, only for Schlemmi to call in a bounty hunter and attempt to take over the Lexx for himself.
9	5	"Lafftrak"	Paul Donovan	Lex Gigeroff	January 8, 1999
Two planets, Liber and Leester, long ago destroyed each other in a ratings war. The crew discover a small, automated planetoid that is still producing TV programs. Stan is captured on the planet and forced to take part in various shows, and when he consistently fails to amuse the macabre audience he is demoted to increasingly less dignified positions. Eventually, it is discovered that when contestants fail, they are decapitated and their heads are kept alive to be part of the studio audience for all eternity.
10	6	"Stan's Trial"	Srinivas Krishna	Lex Gigeroff & Paul Donovan	January 15, 1999
Stan needs release and returns to an old haunt for pleasure; another space brothel. Unbeknownst to him and the crew however the Reform Planets have been searching for Stanley, whom they call "the Arch-Traitor", to put him on trial for the destruction of 100 worlds hostile to His Divine Shadow. The trial seems to be legitimate but the chief prosecutor has her own secret intentions: wanting to torture and execute Stanley.
11	7	"Love Grows"	David MacLeod	Jeffrey Hirschfield	January 22, 1999
The episode follows a crew of sleazy space miners – two men and one large woman – who contract a gender-changing and ultimately fatal virus which they then unwittingly share with the crew of the Lexx. While the disease does not affect the external appearance, it changes the genitals and the voice and works on the mind, making men extremely demure and making women into voracious sexual predators. In this episode Stanley Tweedle finally fulfills his dream of having sex with his crewmate Xev Bellringer, although during the encounter their genders are reversed.
12	8	"White Trash"	Chris Bould	Lex Gigeroff & Paul Donovan	January 29, 1999
The Golleans, a family of incestuous cannibal rednecks, has stowed away on the Lexx. After a night of passion with Sissy Gollean, Stanley Tweedle is caught by the jealous Pa Gollean, who plans to kill Stan until Sissy convinces him to let them get married instead. Pa agrees, and then forces Stan to steer the ship to his home planet Vermal so Pa can get revenge on the remaining inhabitants. Whilst on the planet Kai helps Pa's adopted son Norb escape his unpleasant parents on his real father's space ship – The Charger. Maury Chaykin guest stars as Pa Gollean.
13	9	"791"	Jörg Buttgereit	Jeffrey Hirschfield & Paul Donovan	February 5, 1999
The crew of the Lexx get a distress signal from a crashed ship on an uninhabited planet. Stanley Tweedle refuses to go down to investigate, but Lyekka insists that she needs food, and if she doesn't get it she'll be forced to eat the crew. Lyekka plans to eat any survivors down on the surface, but Xev understandably has some moral qualms about this. Once inside the crashed ship, they find jars containing still-beating hearts and 790 finds a cyborg body with which he hopes to finally consummate his love of Xev. A parody of the 1979 space horror-thriller "Alien".
14	10	"Wake the Dead"	Chris Bould	Jeffrey Hirschfield	February 12, 1999
A group of restless and none-too-intelligent teens comes aboard the Lexx, and after 'partying like stink' one of them accidentally reprograms Kai to become a psychotic killing machine. Kai then sets to work systematically murdering each of the teens, taking an uncharacteristic delight in violence. After hunting and killing his prey one by one Xev and Stan fear they may have to abandon the Lexx forever only to be saved at the last moment when Kai runs out of Protoblood. A parody of teen slasher films.
15	11	"Nook"	Bill Fleming	Paul Donovan	February 19, 1999
Stanley Tweedle isn't interested in exploring, but Xev convinces him to do so, saying that she'll have sex with him if she doesn't find somebody to have sex with on the planet first. Stan agrees, and when they venture to the planet they find an order of monks who profess to have no idea what a woman is. It is a repressive and stagnant place, where the monks copy writings out of ancient books without knowing how to read, so that they will not be corrupted by dangerous ideas. Kai asks their leader, Brother Randor, how they procreate without women, but Brother Randor claims ignorance of such matters. Meanwhile, Xev is stirring up trouble by making sexual overtures to various monks.
16	12	"Norb"	Paul Donovan	Paul Donovan	February 26, 1999
Norb, the adopted son of Pa Gollean (see ep2.08), runs across a giant Candy House Satellite. Suddenly, it's consumed by Mantrid Drones (alternatively, the Candy House Satellite could be bait constructed by the Matrid Drones to trap Norb. It contains a colourful version of the Divine Order emblem), who then begin to chase Norb. Norb barely escapes by ejecting as his Charger is overrun by drones. Lexx and the crew hear his distress call in space and pick him up. Once inside he acts very differently from when previously encountered and suddenly his body comes apart to reveal 5 Mantrid Drones. In the process, Norb/Drones kill 790, crushing the tiny piece of human brain that enabled him to love Xev. The drones also deliver a message from Mantrid: "Let the contest begin". Kai and Xev use Kai's protoblood and a protein regenerator to bring 790 back. The Drones begin to "eat" Lexx and make more drones with his parts. The Lexx must reverse its particle drive to save itself.
17	13	"Twilight"	Chris Bould	Paul Donovan, Jeffrey Hirschfield & Lex Gigeroff	March 5, 1999
When Stanley Tweedle becomes gravely ill, the crew of the Lexx take him to the planet Ruuma. There they encounter a ghastly family: the father, Roada, is a scheming sleazeball, the last vestige of the Divine order, left behind on the planet by his brethren after the death of His Shadow; the mother, Hidea, is a shrew; the daughter, Lomea, is a surly goth teen. Ruuma has the power to bring the dead back to a kind of shambling life, and the many corpses of His Divine Shadow's earlier bodies reside here, constantly trying to break in and devour the family. It was Roada's job to look after the bodies when the Cluster was still in operation, but now he's losing control of the situation and it seems the family won't survive long. The same forces that animate the corpses has an unusual effect on Kai and after Xev is bitten it's up to Lyekka to save the day.
18	14	"Patches in the Sky"	David MacLeod	Paul Donovan & Lex Gigeroff	March 12, 1999
Stan is having bad dreams and Xev tells him to do something "mighty" to feel better. Stan accidentally blows up a robot-manned manganese mining planet, after the robot administrator tells him of the Narco-Lounger, that allows people to enter and control their dreams. Fruitcake, a past customer of the Narco-Lounger tells the owner of Narco-World, Gubby, about Patches in the Sky, created by Mantrid's Drones ongoing destruction of the whole universe. The terrible reality of this turns Gubby to drugs. Stan and crew arrive and Stan uses the machine to enter his dreams. Stans dreams turn into nightmares as he dreams of being chased first by the dead robot administrator and then by Giggerota. Xev must enter to save him, while Kai struggles to save them both.
19	15	"Woz"	David MacLeod	Paul Donovan & Lex Gigeroff	March 19, 1999
When 790 reluctantly reveals that Xev has a built-in expiry date that's only 79 hours away, the Lexx heads to the planet Woz where the only remaining Lusticon, the love-slave transformation device, is. Before they can use it to reset Xev's expiry date, however, Stan and Kai are sucked into a war being waged between the Wozzard and The Dark Lady, each having very different opinions about the morality of the Lusticon. This episode is a parody of the movie "Wizard of Oz".
20	16	"The Web"	Chris Bould	Jeffrey Hirschfield & Paul Donovan	March 26, 1999
The crew learn that the only way to escape Mantrid is to flee to the Dark Zone. The only remaining portal is at the exact centre of the universe, and Kai warns them that many bizarre and improbable things exist there. A sinister, alien creature captures the Lexx and possesses the ship's hapless captain, Stanley Tweedle. The ship's robot, 790, attempts to alert the crew that something is wrong with Stan, but by now they've all gotten so used to 790 abusing Stan that nobody takes 790's warnings about Stan seriously. The Web tells the story in a relatively straightforward manner, while The Net fills in the background material, explaining various plot threads and introducing others.
21	17	"The Net"	Chris Bould	Jeffrey Hirschfield & Paul Donovan	April 2, 1999
The Net fills in the background material, explaining various plot threads and introducing others from the previous episode, "The Web." The two episodes are very similar and share a large number of scenes, possibly due to budget constraints.
22	18	"Brigadoom"	Bill Fleming	Paul Donovan & Lex Gigeroff	April 9, 1999
As the crew of the Lexx desperately flee Mantrid's army of robot drones, they encounter a strange, floating theater in space. Once they are inside, an elaborate musical production begins that recounts the history of Kai and his people, the Brunnen-G. Kai and Xev both find themselves taking part in the musical: Kai as himself when he was alive, Xev as Kai's unnamed lover. At the episode's end the musical's message of proudly fighting even in the face of sure defeat convinces Stanley Tweedle to join his friends in battle against Mantrid. The inspiration for this episode is the musical Brigadoon, where a cursed town only appears one day every hundred years.
23	19	"Brizon"	Paul Donovan	Paul Donovan	April 16, 1999
In an attempt to fight the Mantrid drones, the crew seek assistance from anyone still alive in the rapidly dwindling universe and conveniently find Brizon, Mantrid's teacher, mentor and predecessor in the role of Supreme Bio-Vizier. Brizon is little more than an engineered, animated corpse, who hijacks Xev's liver, and tries to extort sex from her (hopefully using Stan's penis). He continues his amusing rivalry with Mantrid. His plan to defeat Mantrid involves capturing a working drone arm and activating a code he had previously installed in Mantrid's machine's programming. Mantrid plays dead for a little while, and then announces that it was all his devious plan from the start.
24	20	"End of the Universe"	Paul Donovan	Paul Donovan, Lex Gigeroff & Jeffrey Hirschfield	April 23, 1999
In a last-ditch bid to save the light universe from Mantrid's drones, 790 discovers (way too late), that he can create self replicating drones of his own, to fight Mantrid. Kai and 790 hatch a cunning plan to distract Mantrid, long enough for him to make the mistake of moving too many drones around them, thus engulfing them all in a giant black hole, collapsing the light universe, and shooting the Lexx into the Dark Zone. Lyekka's pod is damaged, and she demonstrates yet more inexplicable talents, transforming herself into a Lyekka drone, and pulling Mantrid from his interface. She is killed in the process, somehow lodging part of herself in Stan's mind.

=== Season 3 (2000) ===
No. overall	No. in season	Title	Directed by	Written by	Original release date
25	1	"Fire and Water"	Chris Bould	Paul Donovan & Lex Gigeroff	February 6, 2000
After being adrift for 4,332 years, Lexx comes into orbit of the planets Fire and Water. The leader of Fire, Prince, heads an expedition in a balloon to intercept the Lexx. He brings back Stan and Xev to Fire, discarding Stan as of little use, and setting him to torture. He tries to woo Xev, and she nearly falls in love with the romantic ruler of a dramatic planet. Kai wakes up, repairs 790, who becomes fixated upon him, and then (having no moth) he decides to long-jump down to planet Water, to find the crew.
26	2	"May"	Chris Bould	Paul Donovan	February 13, 2000
After jumping down to planet Water, Kai finds the beautiful May, the lone survivor of an attack on a Water city. He requisitions an attacking gondola, and sails over to planet Fire. After realising Stanley is the key to the Lexx, Prince brings Stanley back into the picture; dismissing his torture and near execution, as merely "a test". After all being rescued by Kai, May begins to convince Stanley to destroy Fire. Lexx is starving, and they become aware of how stuck they are. As May lapses into death from a small wound on her shoulder, Prince comes to Stanley as a ghost, and tells him that he can have May forever, if he destroys planet Water.
27	3	"Gametown"	Bill Fleming	Paul Donovan & Lex Gigeroff	February 20, 2000
Stanley begins plotting how to destroy the planet Water without alerting Kai and Xev, or steering the starving Lexx. May gets better or worse, depending on his attitude. After waking the moth breeders, Kai goes to Gametown to find some food for Lexx. Gametown is a floating city inhabited with aerobics enthusiasts who play basketball all day. There is one inhabitant who is not quite right: Fifi. He doesn't play the games by the rules, and he quickly betrays everyone, by stealing all the moths and food, then heading over to Fire, to surrender himself to Duke, so he can destroy Water. Stanley's attempts on Water are foiled by Xev, who nearly strangles him, then smothers him with her breasts. May ridicules him, and heads off with Prince.
28	4	"Boomtown"	Chris Bould	Paul Donovan & Lex Gigeroff	February 27, 2000
Duke and Fifi attack Gametown. They kill everyone he knows and raze the town. Duke likes Fifi. Kai requisitions an attacking moth, and then heads over to Boomtown with Bunny and Xev. All they do in Boomtown is eat and have sex. Stan is thrilled to find a number of the women willing to sleep with him, but Xev isn't so lucky, as the men have adapted a way of avoiding sex by interminable foreplay. Bunny makes several efforts to have sex with Kai, which he finally deters only by cutting off his left hand to demonstrate that he is not alive. Back on Fire, May kills Prince in a questionable gambit, then Duke and Fifi decide they'll paint May and his former deputy with explosive tar, and burn them. Duke and Fifi fly to Boomtown and burn it.
29	5	"Gondola"	Bill Fleming	Paul Donovan	March 5, 2000
In a dramatic survival episode, the crippled moth falls to Fire in the night. Duke and Fifi also crash. All of them have to make it to a city before the sun rises, or they'll fry. The Lexx team: Bunny, Xev, Stan, and the two Kais find a wrecked gondola and pump it up. During their flight, they realise that there is not enough fuel to make it across the lava lakes, unless there is less weight. The protoblood Kai volunteers to jump overboard and walk through the lava on foot. Duke decides it's easier to just to sit in the desert and die, which worries Fifi a bit. Duke explains the Water/Fire reincarnation system. However, the Lexx team find them, and stupidly pick them up, unable to solve the moral dilemma. Bunny gets thrown overboard. Stan and Xev make it to the tower of K-Town, and then defend themselves against mortal-Kai (who is really Prince), and Fifi.
30	6	"K-Town"	Robert Sigl	Paul Donovan & Lex Gigeroff	March 12, 2000
On entering K-Town through a hole high in the wall, Xev and Stan have to deal with the tunnels and the demented inhabitants, the most evil of the souls incarnate. They meet some people who enjoy throwing rocks at them. Kai climbs up the tower, finds them, and then has a systems failure. They also meet Mantrid, who is devoid of memory, but highly encouraged by the idea that he is the greatest biovizier who ever lived. He participates in Kai's diagnostic procedure, does something stupid, and then Kai cleanses him. Xev and Stan manage to throw Kai off the tower to realign him, but it doesn't work, and he gets captured.
31	7	"Tunnels"	Bruce McDonald	Paul Donovan & Lex Gigeroff	March 19, 2000
Kai is brought before "The Commission", who, in a room full of candles, endeavour to civilly interrogate him, exploring his human evil. Kai is not interested, and requests to be thrown off the tower. The adjudicatrix asks him whether he has killed anyone as an assassin. Kai then delivers his famous speech: "I have killed mothers and their babies. I have killed great philosophers and proud young warriors. I have killed the evil and the good, the intelligent, the weak and the beautiful, but it's been a while since I slaughtered a whole room full of petty bureaucrats". Meanwhile, Stan encounters an amateur surgeon, who feels that he has parts that "he'd feel better without". Prince plays good guy, and dies saving Stan. He wanted Stan to love him. Xev plays with some girls who like bear traps.
32	8	"The Key"	Chris Bould	Paul Donovan	March 26, 2000
Using an incarnation in Xev's image, Prince continually probes Kai, 790, and Stan, asking for a way to get the key to the Lexx. They hook Stan up to 790's diagnostics and Kai determines that the key could be released during sexual rapture, instead of the ecstasy near death which Prince is so familiar with. Prince then concerns herself with a complicated ritual to give Stan the ride of his life. Kai gets suspicious and tests the Xev impostor twice, to see if she kisses like a real Xev. After obtaining the key, she then countermands the order to destroy planet Fire, and directs Lexx to Water. Kai then kills her, and the key flows to a dismayed Stanley.
33	9	"Garden"	Bruce McDonald	Paul Donovan & Lex Gigeroff	April 2, 2000
Kai and Stan search for Xev in a moth and luckily find her stranded, dehydrated, under a city spire. They fly down to the Garden, and meet three women who spend their day tending to stamens and other flower parts. In an atmosphere of serenity, Kai decides he will plant himself and decompose. Stan wants to stay and teach the gardeners how to please him. Xev longs for a man, and wants to go. Excitedly, the gardeners recreate the Lyekka plant using a hallucinogenic dream ritual. They court her to eat them, and she obliges. Stanley tells Xev that it was nice knowing her.
34	10	"Battle"	Christoph Schrewe	Paul Donovan	April 9, 2000
The Garden is raided by Prince, and Stan's love, Lyekka, dies again, with 5 arrows in her back. Xev is kidnapped, and Kai requisitions an attacking balloon. From there, they engage in a battle of wits with Prince and his offsider (who appears as Priest in series 4). After a series of daring moves, both Prince and Priest die. Stan and Kai make it to the Lexx, and begin a search for Xev who is walking through the desert. Prince reincarnates near her, to walk with her, and watch her die in the scorching heat. He's not part Cluster Lizard, so he dies first. Rated one of the visually spectacular episodes.
35	11	"Girltown"	Chris Bould	Lex Gigeroff	April 16, 2000
Stan and Kai search for Xev in Girltown. Stan's nubile non-dead body attracts the attention of the "head" Queen (reincarnated Giggerota), who has no body and kind of wants some body. She is interrupted by the all-female committee proceedings of Girltown, who discuss non-she and non-boy sexist agendas, in endless movements and motions. Meanwhile, Kai liberates the drag queen slaves making balloons, who are nice people, and have no idea why they have been sent to this hell. (Guest star Jimmy Somerville cameos.) In the escape, all the gay balloonists are eaten by Lexx. Stan and Kai fall to the planet Water, Kai sinks like a stone.
36	12	"The Beach"	Paul Donovan	Paul Donovan	April 23, 2000
Stan drowns, and washes up upon a metaphysical Beach. He is met by Prince, who explains that it's his judgement time. When asked if he's done anything bad in his life, Stanley really can't remember anything. He's not judged for causing the death of 94 worlds in the light zone. Instead, Prince focuses on his general cowardice and his attempt to destroy planet Water because he lusted for May meanwhile, Xev has found Stan's body and popped it in the freezer while she searches for Kai. Kai observes many souls en route to the center of Water, and finally slips through a light-hole, that lands him on another Gametown. Stan goes to hell.
37	13	"Heaven & Hell"	Paul Donovan	Paul Donovan	April 30, 2000
Xev retrieves Kai, who then dives to the center of planet Fire to rescue Stan. He has a little chat with Prince, who shows him Stanley in the red vortex evil soul repository, where they patiently await rotational incarnate torture with Prince for the rest of eternity. Xev liberates Kai by destroying Fire, then spiritual-Prince gains control of Lexx to destroy Water. The area is filled with good and evil souls, who fly off to Earth on the other side of the sun. Stan's frozen body revives, and he remembers nothing about his judgement.

=== Season 4 (2001–02) ===
No. overall	No. in season	Title	Directed by	Written by	Original release date
38	1	"Little Blue Planet"	Paul Donovan	Paul Donovan	July 13, 2001
Begins with Marconi in Newfoundland 1901 and his trans-Atlantic communication attempt. This strong radio emission attracts the attention of another alien ship way outside the Milky Way. Arriving at Earth, Stanley H. Tweedle starts negotiating with the president, who is using cue cards to cope with alien first contact. They are not adequate to cope with Stan's idiotic presumptions and sexual desires. Isambard Prince, head of the ATF, initiates a plan to attack the Lexx using Russian psycho killers aboard a space shuttle. Prince's old crony from planet Fire, priest, is elected president, and Lexx eats a large chunk of the Amazon rainforest.
39	2	"Texx Lexx"	Chris Bould	Paul Donovan w/ Lex Gigeroff	July 20, 2001
Prince heads towards Lexx in a shuttle. Kai and Xev head to Earth in a moth, which is attacked by stealth fighters. The battle is monitored by a SETI team headed by Dr Longbore (a reincarnation of the Wozzard, from season 2), who embraces Kai, and details him on the Earth's imminent demise due to Higgs Boson research. Stan has to deal with Prince on the Lexx, and the machinations of 790. Xev encounters a romantic Texan boy who wants to marry her before he can have sex, but all his friends want a crack, too, so he has to kill them all. Xev gets arrested and handcuffed for murder.
40	3	"P4X"	Chris Bould	Paul Donovan w/ Lex Gigeroff	July 27, 2001
Xev is admitted to a local Texan jail, where they do things mighty strange. The wardens' goth daughter Lomea (in a reprise of her role from the 2nd Season episode 'Twilight') abducts attractive people from around the jail, and puts them on her P4X pirate internet show. Xev becomes a star with her loveless love slave story, and later in a sex show with other abductees. Meanwhile, Stanley is pinned high on a wall in the ATF, alongside psychopathic schoolboy, Digby, divulging all the secrets of the key to the Lexx. Prince tries to get the key, but doesn't realise that Digby has his own plans, and his own weapons. Hattie Hayridge and Craig Charles cameo.
41	4	"Stan Down"	Colin Bucksey	Lex Gigeroff w/ Paul Donovan	August 3, 2001
Goaded by the first lady, Priest does a deal with Stan to kill Prince, but ends up wiping out Orlando, Florida. In a plan to "save the presidency", he blames Cuba, but Prince isn't convinced, so organises a trip down Dealey Plaza to drill home the importance of loyalty, having the first lady sniped in a scene styled as a pastiche of the Zapruder film. Genevieve G Rota is elected pope, randomly from a real estate guide. A cat becomes possessed by a carrot.
42	5	"Xevivor"	Christoph Schrewe	Jeffrey Hirschfield	August 10, 2001
790 attempts to kill Stan and Xev, by designing the TV game "Xevivor", to be played on island Zig Zig, which he knows to be infested with ruthless carrot probes. The prize for the survivor of Xevivor is Xev. Stan gets entered as a "wildcard" contestant by 790, to compete against beefcakes. As the TV crew and contestants get turned into carrot zombies, Farley (reincarnated Schlemmi, from Season 2, and Fifi, from season 3), the producer is largely concerned with his possible homosexuality. Meanwhile at Longbore's space lab, Tina tries to seduce Kai, while showing him pictures from Transylvania.
43	6	"The Rock"	Stephen Reynolds	Lex Gigeroff w/ Paul Donovan	August 17, 2001
Stan goes to Newfoundland to inspect his loyal subjects, but they spit in his face because he is a duplicate of "Brud", the village shyster. Brud figures this out pretty quickly, and takes on the role of Stanley, meeting Bunny, who had been sent there to seduce Stan. Bunny cradles his rock, but Brud leaves for Lexx anyway, taking all her money. He attempts to seduce Xev using a bad rendition of Greensleeves on his portable keyboard. 790 pushes him off the command deck. Meanwhile Stan is lynched, and Kai plays the tavern pianoman, with endless variations of "Yo Way Yo". Prince sets Priest up with Bunny as his new trophy wife whom Prince knows will be less trouble than the previous first lady. Priest nukes Newfoundland.
44	7	"Walpurgis Night"	Colin Bucksey	Tom de Ville w/ Paul Donovan	August 24, 2001
Kai needs to go to Transylvania to explore his curiosity. In the tavern, they bump into bats, superstitious villagers, Van Helsing, and 3 goth girls. They are invited to the castle for the Walpurgis feast, which is hosted by a British actor playing Dracul. Stan has "dead thing pie". Kai is trapped in a spiked coffin by Grenfield, the owner. The goth girls do various things to Xev and Stan, and then stamp on Dracul's plastic teeth. Stan incites a riot back at the tavern. The castle is stormed, and Dracul is killed (ex contract). The goths wake Vlad with a sample of protoblood. Lionel Jeffries appears in this episode in his final role.
45	8	"Vlad"	Christoph Schrewe	Tom de Ville w/ Paul Donovan & Lex Gigeroff	September 7, 2001
Stan gets an urge to revisit Transylvania. As their slave, he takes the goth sisters back to Lexx, where they steal all Kai's protoblood for Vlad. 790 removes the parablood from Stan, and Kai goes back to Earth to face the divine executioner. Their fight ends up back on Lexx, where Vlad bites Xev and Stan. However, Xev is not affected by parablood and successfully pushes Vlad into the cryo unit.
46	9	"Fluff Daddy"	Chris Bould	Jeffrey Hirschfield w/ Paul Donovan	September 14, 2001
Prince lures the crew down to Earth. Bunny is told to have sex with Stan. On Bunny's porn video, Stan notices Lyekka (Loo Loo), and tries to get close to her by being the new fluffer. Prince shows Xev the mortal Kai, who is an actor who really suffers for his art, injecting staples into his feet and sleeping on the stage. He wants celibacy until his show has run (2 – 6 months). Xev eats him anyway, in a fit of cluster lizard hormones. Stan uses Prince and the ATF to access Lyekka. Using her movie "Oval Orifice" as a way to steal the key from Stanley, both Loo Loo and her director go to the Lexx, and releases Vlad. Stan is arrested for theft, and sent to a loony bin.
47	10	"Magic Baby"	Colin Bucksey	Paul Donovan w/ Lex Gigeroff	September 28, 2001
After escaping from the clutches of the asylum, the crew meet Uther, who gives them a lift to the space shuttle. Back on Lexx, Uther works his magic on Xev, only to be interrupted by Vlad coming out of the cryo unit. Uther is converted to a slave, and Xev is executed. Vlad proceeds to suck the life out of Kai, and then Stan gets up the courage to kill Vlad using the druid's staff. Stan then patches up Xev's body the best he can.
48	11	"A Midsummer's Nightmare"	Carl Harvey	Jon Spira & Andrew Selzer w/ Paul Donovan	October 24, 2001
Loosely based upon A Midsummer Night's Dream. Stan and Kai take Xev's beautiful corpse down to the feast of Morgath because Uther vaguely promised that the dead could be risen. There, Oberon recognises the Red Fool, and The Dark man, and dominates the proceedings; attempting to marry Xev for 1500 years. Kai is turned into a joyful singing tree. Xev refuses Oberon, so he turns to Stan, who also refuses him after he realises that Oberon wants 1500 years of back door sex. Titania saves them by tricking Oberon into marrying her/him for eternity.
49	12	"Bad Carrot"	Colin Bucksey	Jeffrey Hirschfield	October 31, 2001
The carrot probes invade US supermarkets, and leading scientists analyse how the carrots penetrate their hosts. The Whitehouse is overcome, so Prince, priest, and Bunny flee to the Lexx, accidentally taking a carrot with them. 790 sides with the carrot to eliminate everyone but Kai. Prince teaches him Chess, and offers a wager. Kai demonstrates his increasing cynicism about 790 and works out what is going on.
50	13	"769"	Colin Bucksey	Paul Donovan & Lex Gigeroff	February 8, 2002
On Lexx, Xev and Stan threaten to kill Prince, but they can't do it, and Kai runs out of protoblood. 790 has the agenda of obtaining a body, so he helps Prince and Priest strangle half the moth breeders to get the key to the Lexx. Back on Earth he is attached to the body of a moth breeder, and he selects a penis from one of America's finest. Bunny is given orders to kill the crew of the Lexx, but she can't do it. Prince returns to Lexx, and almost kills Stan and Xev. Bunny loses the key to the Lexx by having sex with Priest. Prince is killed for the first time.
51	14	"Prime Ridge"	Christoph Schrewe	Jeffrey Hirschfield	February 15, 2002
The crew buy a house in Prime Ridge, using money from ATMs that 790 rigs for them. Xev's cooking is atrocious, Kai doesn't like his new fridge, and after a day they get bored of TV. Xev gets a job at CJD Meat Products as a counsellor (as a way to get sex), where she meets Cleesby. Stan reckons he's got a chance to get it on with the realtor, and her daughter Picolina gets in on the action. Kai starts running out of protoblood, gives druggies all the money, and starts acting as high as they are. Everyone is a gun wielding psycho, and the episode ends in a massive shootout; S.W.A.T ruins the lawn, bullet holes line the walls, Cleesby and Picolina decide sex is better than shooting each other, and the druggies take off in the moth, leaving the gang no option but to use the neighbor's car for a getaway. Features Britt Ekland as the realtor, "Dulcibella Sternflanks".
52	15	"Mort"	Christoph Schrewe	Jeffrey Hirschfield w/ Paul Donovan	February 22, 2002
Derived from Bride of Re-Animator. Fleeing from the authorities, with exhausted Kai in a shopping trolly, Xev and Stan shelter in a funeral parlour run by Mort. Mort is assembling his "unofficial" girlfriend, Deedee, from spare parts. He rejects Xev's breasts only on blood type, and becomes fascinated by Kai's protoblood, which Kai readily donates. Xev and Stan show their supreme insensitivity whilst escorting mourners to coffins. On Lexx, 790 will not cooperate because Kai cannot speak. Meanwhile Xev fends off deputy Festus with promises of sex, but she gives him re-animated Deedee instead. Deedee then kills Mort in the name of His Divine Shadow.
53	16	"Moss"	Stephen Manuel	Lex Gigeroff & Paul Donovan	March 1, 2002
On the run Xev, Stan and Kai are abducted by Moss (in a reincarnation from season 2), head of the AFR. Using information from them, he masquerades as Prince, and installs himself as the head of the ATF. Moss has numerous conspiracy theories involving "666", which are totally insane, but largely correct. He then puts the crew on a show trial for being in league with Prince, where he plays all legal roles, then decides to execute them. Prince (residing in his TV set) directs Bunny to read a note to the Idaho AFR, who then ride a moth to the ATF, and shoot all the AFR.
54	17	"Dutch Treat"	Carl Harvey	Jeffrey Hirschfield	March 8, 2002
Lexx is convulsing with starvation, and the crew decide to abandon him, leaving 790 behind as punishment for his latest treachery. They plan to hitch a ride with the Earth ship Noah, that 790 designed. Tina discovers that Ernst Longbore has his own secret plans about who is going onto his ship, and is sniffing the histocompatibily of schoolgirls. Prince re-boards the Lexx. Priest and Bunny shoot nearly every moth breeder to get the key, and then command Lexx to destroy Earth. Lexx only has enough charge to destroy Ottawa, so he eats Holland instead. Xev releases the key from Bunny – the lesbian way – but Stanley captures it in transit.
55	18	"The Game"	Paul Donovan	Paul Donovan	March 15, 2002
A grippingly executed chess game derived from The Seventh Seal. With the experience of a partially played chess game against Prince in "Bad Carrot", Kai plays for his soul, against the lives of Stan and Xev. He is confident of winning and enters the game willingly, much to Stan and Xev's objection. He plays a game of deception, and bets he can make Prince overconfident. The chess characters are all from Lexx episodes. The icy landscape scenery changes with the mood. Kai wins, but gains nothing.
56	19	"Haley's Comet"	Stephen Manuel	Paul Donovan	March 22, 2002
Out near the orbit of Jupiter, the crew encounter a Russian space pod full of students, whose only agenda is to get onto the Lexx and commandeer it. Except Haley. Haley, with the trust fund, has been conned and used by the rest of them, and thinks she is on a mission against "the corporations". One of the girls has the hots for Kai, so 790 sees his chance to eliminate everybody by manipulating Haley. He guides her to a Black Pack weapon, and drives her into a killing spree – because it feels good.
57	20	"Apocalexx Now"	Paul Donovan	Lexx Gigeroff w/ Paul Donovan	March 29, 2002
A faint resemblance to Apocalypse Now. Stan wakes the crew to decide whether to destroy the carrot mothership, but is halted by a Lyekka-lookalike. Smitten, and suddenly amenable, Stan agrees that maybe Lyekka can lunch on some of Earth, but only if she negotiates which part, with the "ruler of Earth". President Priest and Pope Giggerota are in Vietnam, being idiotic. The Pope captures Stan and Priest and plays gasoline golf with them. After lookalike-Lyekka eats the Pope, Priest suggests that she eat Japan. As a parting gesture, Priest nukes Vietnam.
58	21	"Viva Lexx Vegas"	Chris Bould	Lex Gigeroff, Jon Spira, Andy Selzer & Frank McGinn	April 5, 2002
The crew have to kill a day before the next shuttle flight, so Bunny suggests Las Vegas. Stan is determined to keep a low profile, but sends for two prostitutes – who don't do anything for him. He sends Kai and Xev outside. The Egyptian themed hotel just happens to be storing the mummy of a philosopher poet called Drago, that Kai dispatched ages ago. The mummy goes on a killing spree. We learn that Kai has also killed "the pedantic, and the pseudo intellectual."
59	22	"Trip"	Stephen Manuel	Jeffrey Hirschfield	April 12, 2002
Each planet the crew encounters on their search for a new home appears to be stripped of life. They conclude that it was "Lyekka", but Stan is still convinced that Lyekka has changed her ways. "Lyekka" gives the crew a going away present, which appears to be yummy fruitballs, but ends up being a paranoid psychotic adventure, egged on by 790. The cryo control is wrecked and Kai mentions that he only has "days, a few weeks at best" of protoblood left.
60	23	"Lyekka vs Japan"	Christoph Schrewe & Paul Donovan	Jeffrey Hirschfield	April 19, 2002
Kai and Xev land near where a "Lyekka" asteroid hit near the coast of Japan, and meet the monks of a Buddhist monastery. There, Xev learns of "inner pieces"; her organs nearly harvested by the "Master". A Godzilla-sized Lyekka comes out of the sea and starts devastating Tokyo. Kai slays her, and Lexx blasts the walking asteroid that emerges afterwards. The last few minutes of the episode are prematurely feel-good, as Stan decides to head away from Earth forever.
61	24	"Yo Way Yo"	Paul Donovan	Paul Donovan	April 26, 2002
Dr Longbore selects his crew of schoolgirls to go onto Noah with him. But just before he boards, Priest and Bunny take his ride, and he is fried during blastoff. Out of spite, Longbore has left a Higgs boson accelerator to destroy everything. The aliens start tearing into Earth using moon-sized tentacled asteroids. Kai starts towing the accelerator to use it against the aliens, but after Xev, Stan and he leave Earth, 790 destroys it using senile Lexx. Prince grants Kai his mortality, as he tows the accelerator into the main alien asteroid, and collapses it. Kai crashes into the core in almost a shot for shot duplicate of the first time he died and laughs from the irony as the accelerator's Higgs Boson value is determined as 131313… and explodes. Prince appears on the Noah, rejoicing, with Priest kissing his hand in submission. Lexx disintegrates due to extreme old age, and spawns a baby Lexx. Stan and Xev enter the new Lexx, and Stan becomes the new captain. Stan dubs the new Lexx as "Little Lexx", and orders him to find them all a new home. Little Lexx sucks up a floating 790, as they fly away into the unknown galaxy.
