= Jeffrey Hirschfield =

Canadian screenwriter and voice actor

Jeffrey Hirschfield is a Canadian screenwriter and voice actor. He co-developed the science fiction series Lexx, writing scripts for three of its four seasons and voicing the character of 790, a talking robot head.

Hirschfield is also the creator of the live action/animated science fiction adventure series Zixx. He served as the story editor for the series and wrote five of the first thirteen episodes.

Hirschfield co-created El Mundo del Lundo for Canada's Comedy Network, on which he also performed. Further writing credits include The Outer Limits, I Was A Sixth Grade Alien, Olliver's Adventures and Starhunter. He has also written a number of stage plays and radio dramas.
