= Mary Walsh: Open Book =

- Genre: Talk show
- Presented by: Mary Walsh
- Country of origin: Canada
- Original language: English
- No. of seasons: 3
- No. of episodes: 64

Production
- Production locations: Halifax, Nova Scotia, Canada
- Running time: 30 min.

Original release
- Network: CBC Television
- Release: 2002 – 2005

Mary Walsh: Open Book is a book club series on CBC Television that aired weekly from 2002 to 2005. Similar to Oprah's Book Club, the series was hosted by actress and comedian Mary Walsh, who moderated a discussion about books and literature with a panel of celebrities and other guests. Each episode of the series was structured around discussion of a single book, including both Canadian and international literature, and both fiction and non-fiction titles. The series aired at 11 p.m. on Sunday nights, attracting relatively strong ratings for a late time slot.

Participants included actors Megan Follows, Greg Malone, Paul Gross and Mark McKinney, political scientist Janice Stein, lawyer and politician Jerome Kennedy, writers Susan Musgrave and Evelyn Lau, singer Jann Arden, journalist Pamela Wallin and columnist Jan Wong.

Michael Donovan was the creator of Open Book.

== Episodes ==
=== Season 1 ===
No. overall	No. in season	Title	Guests	Original release date
1	1	"Edna O'Brien, The Country Girls"	Noreen Golfman, Megan Follows, Ian Brown	July 21, 2002
2	2	"Beryl Bainbridge, According to Queeney"	Sandra Shamas, Pamela Wallin, Fiona Reid	July 28, 2002
3	3	"Mordecai Richler, Barney's Version"	Mark McKinney, Ed Macdonald, Greg Sinclair	August 11, 2002
4	4	"Ian McEwan, Atonement"	Jann Arden, Jackie Maxwell, Barry Newhook	August 18, 2002
5	5	"Alice Munro, Hateship, Friendship, Courtship, Loveship, Marriage"	Jan Wong, John Frizzell, Jackie Maxwell	August 25, 2002
6	6	"Bruce Chatwin, The Songlines"	Mark McKinney, Diana Swain, John Frizzell	September 1, 2002
7	7	"V.S. Naipaul, Half a Life"	Evelyn Lau, Michael Crummey, David Gilmour	September 8, 2002
8	8	"Pat Barker, Regeneration"	David Gilmour, David Macfarlane, Janice Stein	September 22, 2002
9	9	"Joan Didion, Political Fictions"	Jan Wong, Diana Swain, John Frizzell	September 29, 2002
10	10	"J. K. Rowling, Harry Potter and the Philosopher's Stone"	Albert Schultz, Susan Musgrave, Kenneth Oppel	October 6, 2002
11	11	"David Foster Wallace, A Supposedly Fun Thing I'll Never Do Again"	Mark Farrell, Greg Sinclair, Noreen Golfman	October 13, 2002
12	12	"Mary Karr, The Liars' Club"	Jann Arden, Jan Wong, Susan Musgrave	October 20, 2002

=== Season 2 ===
No. overall	No. in season	Title	Guests	Original release date
14	1	"Sandra Gulland, The Many Lives & Secret Sorrows of Josephine B."	John Frizzell, Sheila McCarthy, Scott Thompson	October 12, 2003
15	2	"JT LeRoy, Sarah"	David Gilmour, Noreen Golfman, Bryden MacDonald	October 19, 2003
16	3	"Robert D. Kaplan, Balkan Ghosts: A Journey Through History"	Margaret MacMillan, Heather Mallick, Carolyn McCool	October 26, 2003
17	4	"Margaret Drabble, The Peppered Moth"	Eleanor Wachtel, Fiona Reid, Susan Goyette	November 2, 2003
18	5	"Margaret Visser, Much Depends on Dinner"	Heather Mallick, Neville MacKay, Patricia Rozema	November 9, 2003
19	6	"Antonia White, Frost in May"	Shirley Douglas, Bette MacDonald, Wendy Crewson	November 16, 2003
20	7	"Greg Critser, Fat Land"	David Foot, Diana Swain, Fiona Reid	November 23, 2003
21	8	"Mikhail Bulgakov, The Master and Margarita"	Greg Malone, Ed Macdonald, Lynn Coady	November 30, 2003
22	9	"Alice Sebold, The Lovely Bones"	Sylvia Hamilton, Sheila McCarthy, John Frizzell	December 7, 2003
23	10	"Ian Rankin, Tooth and Nail"	Paul Gross, Jerome Kennedy, Alison Gzowski	December 14, 2003
24	11	"Louise Erdrich, Love Medicine"	Ed Macdonald, Jennifer Podemski, Evelyn Lau	December 21, 2003
25	12	"Philip Pullman, The Golden Compass"	David Gilmour, Noreen Golfman, Spider Robinson	December 28, 2003
26	13	"Elizabeth Smart, By Grand Central Station I Sat Down and Wept"	Katherine Govier, David Macfarlane, Jackie Burroughs	January 4, 2004
27	14	"Margaret MacMillan, Paris 1919: Six Months That Changed the World"	Lloyd Axworthy, Warren Kinsella, Lesley Choyce	January 4, 2004
28	15	"Robert Penn Warren, All the King's Men"	Svend Robinson, Kim Campbell, Stevie Cameron	January 11, 2004
29	16	"Margaret Laurence, The Diviners"	Lisa Moore, Susan Goyette, Jackie Burroughs	January 18, 2004
30	17	"William Trevor, The Collected Stories"	Geoff Pevere, Evelyn Lau, Michael Winter	January 25, 2004
31	18	"Mary Gordon, The Shadow Man"	Kathleen Edwards, Brian D. Johnson, Sylvia Hamilton	February 1, 2004
32	19	"Ruth Rendell, A Dark-Adapted Eye"	Alexa McDonough, Jerome Kennedy, Evelyn Lau	February 8, 2004
33	20	"Iris Murdoch, The Sea, the Sea"	Stevie Cameron, Paul Greenhalgh, Vincent Walsh	February 22, 2004
34	21	"Fay Weldon, Down Among the Women"	Cameron Bailey, Michael Winter, Shirley Douglas	February 29, 2004
35	22	"Doris Lessing, Martha Quest"	Erica Ehm, Hana Gartner, Lesley Choyce	March 14, 2004
36	23	"Percy Janes, House of Hate"	Geoff Pevere, Peter MacNeill, Susan Goyette	March 21, 2004
37	24	"Graham Greene, The Comedians"	Michael Crummey, Mark Critch, Elizabeth May	March 28, 2004
38	25	"Claire Tomalin, Samuel Pepys: The Unequalled Self"	Elliott Leyton, Margaret MacMillan, Fiona Reid	April 4, 2004
39	26	"Virginia Woolf, Orlando"	Michael Crummey, Marni Jackson, Ian Brown	April 18, 2004

=== Season 3 ===
No. overall	No. in season	Title	Guests	Original release date
40	1	"Janice Kulyk Keefer, Thieves"	Katherine Govier, Fiona Reid, Greg Malone	October 3, 2004
41	2	"James Joyce, Dubliners"	Geoff Pevere, Andy Jones, Robert MacNeil	October 10, 2004
42	3	"Jean Rhys, Wide Sargasso Sea"	David Gilmour, Ralph Benmergui, Valerie Buhagiar	October 17, 2004
43	4	"Joel Thomas Hynes, Down to the Dirt"	Cameron Bailey, Ed Macdonald, David Gilmour	October 24, 2004
44	5	"Martin Clark, The Many Aspects of Mobile Home Living"	Heather Mallick, Michael Winter, Leo Furey	October 31, 2004
45	6	"Nuala O'Faolain, Are You Somebody?"	Diana Swain, Michael Winter, Fiona Reid	November 7, 2004
46	7	"J. M. Coetzee, Disgrace"	Ed Macdonald, Austin Clarke, Ian Brown	November 14, 2004
47	8	"Jane Smiley, The Greenlanders"	Michael Crummey, Jackie Burroughs, Jennifer Baichwal	November 21, 2004
48	9	"Sebastian Faulks, Birdsong"	Jackie Burroughs, Susan Goyette, Noreen Golfman	November 28, 2004
49	10	"John Cheever, The Stories of John Cheever"	Brian D. Johnson, Geoff Pevere, John Frizzell	December 5, 2004
50	11	"Richard Ford, Independence Day"	Mark McKinney, Michael Winter, Kerri Sakamoto	December 12, 2004
51	12	"Jonathan Bate, John Clare: A Biography"	Mark McKinney, Susan Goyette, Stephen Kimber	December 19, 2004
52	13	"Rian Malan, My Traitor's Heart"	John Frizzell, Marni Jackson, Hana Gartner	January 2, 2005
53	14	"Christopher Byron, Testosterone Inc: Tales of CEOs Gone Wild"	Robert MacNeil, Heather Mallick, Ralph Benmergui	January 9, 2005
54	15	"Hugh MacLennan, Two Solitudes"	Linden MacIntyre, Cameron Bailey, Émile Gaudreault	January 16, 2005
55	16	"Elizabeth Bowen, The Last September"	Susan Goyette, Heather Mallick, Seamus O'Regan	January 23, 2005
56	17	"William Boyd, Any Human Heart"	Marivel Taruc, Bill Casselman, Seamus O'Regan	January 30, 2004
57	18	"Jonathan Lethem, Motherless Brooklyn"	Mark McKinney, Johanna Schneller, Julie Stewart	February 6, 2005
58	19	"Gil Courtemanche, A Sunday at the Pool in Kigali"	Linden MacIntyre, Rick Salutin, Don Connolly	February 13, 2005
59	20	"Tobias Smollett, The Expedition of Humphry Clinker"	Ralph Benmergui, David Gilmour, Katherine Govier	February 27, 2005
60	21	"Roland Huntford, The Last Place on Earth"	Ralph Benmergui, Douglas Bell, Lisa Taylor	March 6, 2005
61	22	"Fyodor Dostoevsky, Crime and Punishment"	Greg Malone, Ed Macdonald, Julie Stewart	March 13, 2005
62	23	"Olivia Manning, The Balkan Trilogy"	David Gilmour, Julie Stewart, Linden MacIntyre	March 20, 2005
63	24	"Gabriel García Márquez, Living to Tell the Tale"	Tal Bachman, M. G. Vassanji, Jane Urquhart	March 27, 2005
64	25	"Anthony Powell, A Dance to the Music of Time"	Linden MacIntyre, Michael Crummey, Julie Stewart	April 3, 2005

== Impact ==
The show was spoofed on Royal Canadian Air Farce as Open Book with Marg the Princess Warrior, with Roger Abbott impersonating Walsh in her Marg Delahunty persona from This Hour Has 22 Minutes, discussing books with her guests (including Luba Goy's Margaret Atwood). The running gag was Marg's tendency to rant incessantly about each book and then stray off-topic into her political views and declaring her opinion supreme, eventually driving away her guests.
