= The S and M Comic Book =

Canadian series of four sketch comedy specials

The S and M Comic Book is a Canadian series of four sketch comedy specials, that aired on CBC Television in 1986 and 1987. Starring Greg Malone and Tommy Sexton, the series evolved out of the pair's touring show Two Foolish to Talk About.

Sketches on the show frequently featured celebrity impersonations, including Malone's portrayals of Barbara Frum, Ronald Reagan, John Forsythe, Joan Collins, Maureen Forrester and Queen Elizabeth II, and Sexton's impressions of Sylvester Stallone and Ginette Reno.

The series won two Gemini Awards in 1987, for Best Variety Series and Best Performance in a Variety or Performing Arts Series. It was produced by Cynthia Grech - Kirkbride. Instead of expanding Comic Book into a permanent series, Malone and Sexton worked with their colleagues Mary Walsh, Andy Jones and Cathy Jones to develop the CODCO series, which began airing in 1988.
