= Michael Wade (Canadian actor) =

Canadian actor, writer, musician

- Born: Michael Wade; October 30, 1944; Avondale, Newfoundland, Canada
- Died: May 22, 2004 (aged 59); St. John's, Newfoundland and Labrador, Canada
- Education: Memorial University of Newfoundland
- Years active: 1966–2004
- Known for: Founded Newfoundland's first Shakespeare company

Michael Wade (October 30, 1944 – May 22, 2004) was a Canadian actor, writer and musician. Born in Avondale, Newfoundland, he founded Newfoundland's first Shakespeare company in 1984.

A graduate of Memorial University of Newfoundland, he first published poetry in Harold Horwood's anthology Voices Underground. In the early 1970s, he formed the rock band Ash Wednesday with Drew McGillivray. He briefly moved to Los Angeles in the late 1970s, but by 1981, he was back in St. John's, where his first play, The Fig Tree, debuted with a cast that included Mary Walsh. His later plays included The Past Itch, The First Stone and Last Dance at the Avalon.

As an actor, his film and television credits included John and the Missus (1986), The Adventure of Faustus Bidgood (1986), Finding Mary March (1988), The Boys of St. Vincent (1992), Secret Nation (1992), Gullage's (1996), and Misery Harbour (1999), and he had a recurring role in the CBC Radio comedy series The Great Eastern as Ish Lundrigan. His stage credits included productions of Shakespeare's The Tempest, Peter Luke's Hadrian the Seventh, Edward Riche's List of Lights, Anton Chekhov's Uncle Vanya and Ray Guy's Swinton Massacre.

Wade was nominated for a Gemini Award, and received a best actor Moonsnail Award at the 1996 Atlantic Film Festival, for his work in Gullage's.

Returning to older pursuits in his later years, he published a volume of poetry, Poems, in 1999, and released a solo album, One Way Love, in 2003.

He died of cancer at his home in St. John's on May 22, 2004.
