= Secret Nation =

- Directed by: Michael Jones
- Written by: Edward Riche
- Produced by: Paul Pope; Don Haig
- Starring: Cathy Jones
- Production companies: National Film Board of Canada; Black Spot; Newfoundland Independent Filmmakers Co-operative
- Release date: 1992
- Country: Canada
- Budget: $2 million

Secret Nation is a 1992 political thriller written by Edward Riche, directed by Mike Jones and starring Cathy Jones, with Rick Mercer, Ron Hynes, Mary Walsh, Andy Jones and other well-known Newfoundland actors in supporting roles.

Cathy Jones plays Frieda Vokey, a graduate student in history working to complete her thesis on confederation in 1949. She returns home to Newfoundland to investigate the theory that the province's 1949 entry into Canada was the result of a conspiracy. Examining personal papers released following the death of a politician with significant involvement in Newfoundland's entry into confederation, she begins to believe that the results of the referendums were faked, and that confederation with Canada may not have been the will of the people of the time.

Secret Nation was produced for nearly $2 million by the National Film Board of Canada, with $1.8 million provided by First Choice and the CBC. The film was invited to New York City’s Museum of Modern Art, and screened as part of the This Film is From Canada Series.

== Plot ==
The film opens with the death of Leo Cryptus (Denys Ferry), the fictional Chief Returning Officer for the 1948 referendums on whether Newfoundland should to return to responsible government, become a province of Canada, or remain under direct rule from London. Frieda Vokey (Cathy Jones) is a graduate student at McGill University in Montreal completing her doctoral thesis on Newfoundland's 1949 entry into confederation. Her academic advisors in Montreal don't understand her thesis and treat it as "some kind of 'Newfie' joke". Disheartened, Vokey returns to her hometown of St. John’s, Newfoundland, unsure of herself and how to proceed.

Frieda is welcomed home by her mother, Oona (Mary Walsh)and her brother Chris (Rick Mercer), but subsequently has a heated discussion with her father, Lester (Michael Wade), now a private advisor to Premier Valentine Aylward (Andy Jones). Frieda wants to interview former Premier Joey Smallwood (Kevin Noble) before his impending death, but Lester argues strenuously against it. However, he subsequently brings her to the wake of Leo Cryptus, where she is introduced to Michael Cryptus (Géza Kovács), Leo's son. Frieda is then warned by Dr. Furey (Brian Hennessey) that Newfoundland is not the best place to study Newfoundland history because many people still have strong feelings about the past.

Frieda meets local Newfoundland journalist, Daniel Maddox (Ron Hynes), to discuss her thesis. Maddox invites her to his home for dinner and further discussion, and they have an intimate encounter. Maddox falls asleep and Frieda sneaks into his office, where she find records of cheques sent by the British Government which were declined. She also find letters to Maddox from the British Archives, declining his request for more information Newfoundland’s joining of confederation. Frieda leaves; Maddox awakens and realizes she had searched his office.

Both Frieda and Dan are later involved in an interview over the radio, in which Frieda discusses her findings discovered in Dan’s office. Frieda continues her investigation, after the interview, meeting with Michael, believing he has the information she is looking for regarding his father and the confederation conspiracy. Michael informs Frieda he knows nothing of this and becomes worried that his father was a political monster.

Frieda’s father later decides to help bringing her to an archive containing information on confederation. Frieda questions her father about British spies who helped the apparent scam. Her father states that he has no knowledge on that situation. Frieda then meets with Mr. Joey Smallwood at the hospital, she extensively questions him but he is not willing to speak to her because of his illness.

While attending a benefit banquet, Chris overhears Michael tell Frieda that two British gentlemen will be taking his father's papers to London the next day. He then steals the keys to the legislative assembly building from Doris' handbag and gives them to her. Frieda leaves the benefit dance, goes to the assembly building and quickly locates the secret files she was hoping to find. She also finds the stubs of cheques issued to her father, Lester, in 1949 - apparently to keep him silent about the true outcome of the second referendum. The two British men Michael mentioned arrive and enter the building over the objection of the security guard. Doris (Mary Lewis) and Dan arrive at the building to find out what's going on. Doris tells the men the Public Records Office will get the papers in due course but they are currently her responsibility. The men claim they are worried the papers may have been tampered with. Doris tells them that is ridiculous but she and Dan are quickly restrained when she picks up the phone to call the police. She is shown a badge by one of the men and says to Dan, "They not from the Public Records Office." The four of them then begin to search the building.

Frieda hears the footsteps and quickly packs up some papers to take with her while leaving the rest, as the lights on the floor come on. She encounters Dan as she quietly negotiates her way through the stacks but he does not betray her, instead directing her to an escape route. Frieda then meets Premier Aylward in a taxi outside and shows him the files. He looks at them, puts them back into the envelope, returns them and says, "Don't lose it!" Meanwhile, back at the legislative archive, Doris, Dan and the two British gentlemen find the papers Frieda had been looking at, all back together again. "These papers haven't been tampered with!" she says, but then notices that the elastic band on one accordion file has been undone (but says nothing about it).

Frieda confronts her father when she gets home, showing him the cheque stubs. He then shows her the cheques, which he never cashed. But he admits to conspiring in the deception over the result of the vote, because the people needed relief and he believed joining Canada was the best way to achieve economic stability for the former Dominion.

The next scene is dated December 28. The papers are announcing the death of Joey Smallwood, while the Vokey family are preparing to celebrate the completion of Frieda's thesis, A Secret Nation. This happy scene dissolves to a voice over of a letter written by Leo Cryptus August 12, 1948. He reveals to his friend, Douglas, that the vote was for responsible government not confederation with Canada. But the result was changed. He has the only proof - the original signed and sworn affidavit - which he cannot bring himself to destroy. Now, Frieda Vokey has it.

The final scene of the film shows two men taking a cartload of papers to an incinerator. It is the files from the 1948 referendum, and they are being destroyed. One of the men worries aloud that someone may have seen. Someone may know. This scene dissolves to the closing theme, the camera shifting between various images, and finishing with audio recording from the 1948 debate in the Newfoundland House of Assembly, as the credits finish and there is silence.

== Cast ==
- Cathy Jones as Frieda Vokey, a young doctoral history student living in Montreal, Quebec.
- Mary Walsh as Oona Vokey, a real estate agent, Lester's wife and Chris and Frieda's mother.
- Rick Mercer as Chris Vokey, Frieda's brother. Chris is a taxi dispatcher in St. John's and an aspiring artist.
- Michael Wade as Lester Vokey, editor of The Evening Telegram and a private advisor to Premier Aylward. Lester is an alcoholic.
- Ron Hynes as Dan Maddox, a Newfoundland journalist and history professor at Memorial University.
- Kay Anonsen as Margie, a friend of Frieda and later a love interest of Chris.
- Géza Kovács as Michael Cryptus, son of Leo Cryptus.
- Denys Ferry as Leo Cryptus, the (fictional) Chief Returning Officer for the 1948 confederation referendums.
  - Michael Jones provided the voice for Leo Cryptus in the end of story voiceover.
- Mary Lewis as Doris, holder of the keys for the historical archives of the government of Newfoundland.
- Ken Campbell as Cecil Parkinson, a British lawyer who works for the Smallwood family, specifically tasked with keeping Smallwood's illness out of the public eye.
- Brian Hennessey as Dr. Furey
- John Doyle as Frieda's thesis advisor in Montreal
- Michael Chiasson as Professor in Montreal
- Kevin Noble as Joseph R. Smallwood
- Richard Cashin as Peter John Cashin, an opponent of Confederation and proponent of responsible government
- Peter Miller as Radio Interviewer
- Andy Jones as Premier Valentine Aylward
- Edward Riche as reporter Ed Riche
- Andrew Younghusband as Brian Peckford #2
- Brian Peckford as Brian Peckford #3

Joey Smallwood and Louis St. Laurent appear uncredited in archival footage of the signing of the Confederation Agreement in 1949. Peter Cashin appears uncredited in archival audio of the pre-Confederation debates.

== Production ==
The film was produced by Paul Pope, with executive producer Don Haig.

The film was shot in Petty Harbour and St. John's, Newfoundland, Canada in the late Fall. Filming took just over 6 weeks. The production companies involved were Black Spot and Newfoundland Independent Filmmakers Co-Operative.

The cast and crew consisted of upwards of 80 people.

The cost of filming was nearly $2 million with $1.8 million coming from pre-sale provided by First Choice and CBC.

== Awards and achievements ==
At the 13th Genie Awards in 1992, songwriter Ron Hynes won the award for Best Original Song for The Final Breath from the motion picture Secret Nation.

Michael Jones took home a Special Achievement award for Secret Nation at the East Coast Music Awards in. The film featured many local artists such as Ron Hynes, Thomas Trio and the Red Albino and Jeff Johnston.

Michael Jones was invited with his film, Secret Nation, to the Museum of Modern Art in New York City.

== Bibliography ==
1.Fitzgerald, John Edward. “Newfoundland Politics And Confederation Revisited: Three New Works.” Newfoundland Studies Vol.9 No.1(1993): 109-114. Print.

2.John Perlin. “More truth than fiction in Secret Nation?” The Evening Telegram 18 Oct.1992:21.Print.

3.J.M. Sullivan. “Secret Nation: On Location.” The Sunday Telegram 18 Nov. 1990:22.Print.

4.“Secret Nation.” The Sunday Telegram . Nov.1990:Print.

5.“Secret Nation/delving into the past.” The Express. Oct 28. 1992. Print

6. "Secret Nation Goes to the Big Apple." The Express. March 3. 1993. Print.
