= Mack Furlong =

Canadian actor, writer and musician

- Occupations: Radio writer, actor and presenter, playwright
- Known for: The Great Eastern

Mack Furlong is an actor, writer and musician based in St. John's, Newfoundland and Labrador, Canada. Furlong has been a frequent host of, and contributor to, CBC Radio programs.

Along with Steven Palmer and Ed Riche, Furlong co-wrote and co-created The Great Eastern, a comedic radio show purporting to be a genuine arts and entertainment program, that ran on CBC Radio One between 1994 and 1999. Furlong played Paul Moth, the host of the titular show-within-a-show The Great Eastern, as well as voicing other minor characters. Furlong reprised his role as Paul Moth in the 2004 radio spinoff series Sunny Days and Nights, which he also co-wrote and co-created.

Furlong has appeared as an actor in films such as Multiple Choice, Rare Birds, Crackie and Love and Savagery. He is the co-author of the play I Want It All, about artist Rockwell Kent's time spent in Newfoundland in 1914–15.

Furlong was the 2014 recipient of the John Drainie Award, which is presented annually to recognize individuals who have made a significant contribution to broadcasting in Canada.
