= CSI: NY season 9 =

CSI: NY
- Season 9
- Season 9 U.S. DVD cover
- No. of episodes: 17

Release
- Original network: CBS
- Original release: September 28, 2012 – February 22, 2013

Season chronology
- ← Previous; Season 8

The ninth and final season of CSI: NY originally aired on CBS between September 2012 and February 2013. It is the shortest season of CSI: NY, consisting of only 17 episodes. Its regular time slot on Fridays moved to 8pm/7c for the first two episodes, then back to 9pm/8c beginning with the third episode. On May 10, 2013, CBS canceled the show, making it the second series in the CSI franchise to end.

Episode 15, "Seth and Apep", was the second part of a two-part crossover with CSI: Crime Scene Investigation.

CSI: NY – The Ninth Season was released on DVD in the U.S. on June 25, 2013.

== Cast ==
=== Main cast ===
- Gary Sinise as Mac Taylor
- Sela Ward as Jo Danville
- Carmine Giovinazzo as Danny Messer
- Anna Belknap as Lindsay Messer
- Robert Joy as Sid Hammerback
- A. J. Buckley as Adam Ross
- Hill Harper as Sheldon Hawkes
- Eddie Cahill as Don Flack

=== Recurring cast ===
- Kathleen Munroe as Samantha Flack
- Megan Dodds as Christine Whitney
- Natalie Martinez as Jamie Lovato

=== Special guest star ===
- Ted Danson as D.B. Russell

== Episodes ==
No. overall	No. in season	Title	Directed by	Written by	Original release date	US viewers (millions)
181	1	"Reignited"	Jeff T. Thomas	Zachary Reiter & John Dove	September 28, 2012	9.11
After his friend, an FDNY firefighter, dies in a suspicious fire he responded to, Mac discovers similarities between that fire and a string of arson cases dating back fifteen years and decides to risk working with a pyromaniac ex-arsonist known as Leonard Brooks (Rob Morrow) to uncover the mastermind.
182	2	"Where There's Smoke..."	Skipp Sudduth	Adam Targum & Sarah Byrd	October 5, 2012	8.40
The CSIs rush to stop serial arsonist Leonard Brooks after he begins using fire against people from his dark past. Meanwhile, another detective, Jamie Lovato (Natalie Martinez), transfers to Homicide from Narcotics.
183	3	"2,918 Miles"	Vikki Williams	Trey Callaway	October 12, 2012	9.48
Mac and Jo travel to San Francisco in the search for a missing girl after finding photographs of her supposed dead body beside a male victim.
184	4	"Unspoken"	Duane Clark	Pam Veasey	October 19, 2012	9.48
The CSIs search for a shooter when Lindsay is injured during what appears to be the attempted murder of a political candidate, and the events in the aftermath lead to a child's death. The first half of the episode has no dialogue, just music from punk rock band Green Day's new albums: ¡Uno!, ¡Dos!, and ¡Tré!. Featured songs include "Stop When the Red Lights Flash", "Amy", "Nightlife", "Kill the DJ", and "The Forgotten".
185	5	"Misconceptions"	Nathan Hope	John Dove	October 26, 2012	10.09
The cold case of missing boy Tommy Lewis gets reopened when the main suspect in the disappearance is murdered. The team now has to open old wounds and sift through this tightly-knit neighbourhood full of people with reason to kill the suspect. Meanwhile, Jo becomes curious about Mac's problem with words, and her ruffling leads Mac to warn her to stay out of his personal business, however Mac apologizes to Jo in the next episode. Flack has a day off and spends most of it dealing with family issues that involve trying to bring his sister to forgive and forget the past between her and their father. Based on the disappearance of Etan Patz.
186	6	"The Lady in the Lake"	Scott White	David Hoselton	November 2, 2012	10.05
While draining a lake for a murder weapon, the CSIs come across the body of a woman wearing a ball gown.
187	7	"Clue: SI"	Oz Scott	Steven Lilien & Bryan Wynbrandt	November 9, 2012	9.72
The latest victims in a series of murders leads the CSIs to believe the killer is playing a real life game of Clue. Meanwhile, after she's been pranked on in the lab, Lindsay investigates to find her prankster. Plus, Mac finally tells Christine about his speech Aphasia problem.
188	8	"Late Admissions"	Rob Bailey	Zachary Reiter	November 16, 2012	9.59
The team's latest case leads them into the world of performance enhancing drugs. Meanwhile, Lindsay travels to Montana for the execution of Daniel Katums, the convicted murderer of her childhood friends.
189	9	"Blood Out"	Sam Hill	Adam Targum	November 30, 2012	9.86
Detective Lovato's past as an undercover officer tangles up with her present duty when one of the gang members she ingratiated herself with and developed feelings for turns up tortured and killed.
190	10	"The Real McCoy"	Matt Earl Beesley	Sarah Byrd	December 7, 2012	9.95
The co-owner of a popular bar is found dead. Mac follows Christine's advice to tear up his to-do list and relax on his day off. On his day off Adam visits his father, who has Alzheimer's and is in a care home, trying to get his father to acknowledge him.
191	11	"Command+P"	Howard Deutch	Trey Callaway	January 4, 2013	9.13
The CSIs are confronted with a puzzling mystery when two different victims are linked by the same unusual weapon, a gun created by a special type of 3D printer.
192	12	"Civilized Lies"	Jerry Levine	John Dove	January 11, 2013	10.71
When an off-duty NYPD officer dies during a robbery, the CSI team interrogates the main witness to determine if he was a bystander or if he was somehow involved.
193	13	"Nine Thirteen"	Pam Veasey	Story by : David Fallon & Pam Veasey; Teleplay by : Pam Veasey	January 18, 2013	10.68
The CSIs investigate when a masked man is found at the bottom of a notorious skyscraper known for its history of mysterious deaths. Meanwhile, on her day off Jo runs into a stranger with a surprising link to her past. Lindsay tells Danny she is pregnant and the team reveals that they were betting on whether Lindsay was actually pregnant or not.
194	14	"White Gold"	Alex Zakrzewski	David Hoselton	February 1, 2013	10.39
The CSIs investigate when a pizza maker is carjacked. The investigation leads to something far more sinister than they anticipated.
195	15	"Seth and Apep"	Eric Laneuville	Steven Lilien & Bryan Wynbrandt	February 8, 2013	9.57
D.B. Russell heads to New York to help Mac find Christine's kidnappers before it's too late. This episode concludes a crossover with CSI: Crime Scene Investigation that begins on "In Vino Veritas".
196	16	"Blood Actually"	Christine Moore	Adam Targum	February 15, 2013	8.59
Three separate homicide cases relating to romance are solved. In "Love for Sale" Danville and Lovato respond when Theodore Hart suffers death-by-champaigne. In "Love is Blind" Danny and Hawkes investigate Bernard Chandler's death-by-chocolate. Mac and Flack must find out why Jeremy Howser was shot through the heart "In the Name of Love." Afterwards, team members celebrate Valentine's Day, each in their own ways. Mac and Christine meet at a restaurant where Josh Groban is performing; Don surprises Jamie with a romantic rooftop setting; Ellie cancels her own date to "fly solo" with Jo and a movie; Danny and Lindsay stay in (their unborn child is revealed to be a boy).
197	17	"Today Is Life"	Allison Liddi-Brown	Zachary Reiter & John Dove	February 22, 2013	9.46
When a patrol officer shoots an unarmed man after a jewelry store robbery, a mob forms in front of the precinct. The team struggles to figure out the truth quickly, but they are hindered because Mac, Flack, and the officer are trapped in the station. Later, Mac asks Christine to marry him and she accepts.
