= Sunny Days and Nights =

Sunny Days and Nights was a radio comedy show on CBC Radio One that aired during the summer of 2004. It was ostensibly a CBC show set in the "Hundred Lakes" region of Ontario from the CBC affiliate station CBNR, celebrating its 25th year on air. It was in fact a satire of overly-earnest regional CBC radio programming, and featured the return of the character of Paul Moth (played by Mack Furlong), previously the hapless host of The Great Eastern radio comedy series.

The back story for the show was that long-time host Frank "Sunny" Day had gone into hiding when a circulated CBC publicity photo of him caused the law to indict him for a Ponzi scheme involving cheese futures. Paul Moth was quickly found as his replacement, and he went around insulting interviewees, inadvertently mocking local festivities and spouting bucolic observation of the rural life that came out more crazed and manic than intentioned by the obliviously self-unaware host.

This show was written by Mack Furlong, Steve Palmer, Ed Riche and Glen Tilley (all previously writers for The Great Eastern), and ran for one 10-week season.
