= Cathy Jones =

Canadian actress, comedian and writer (born 1955)

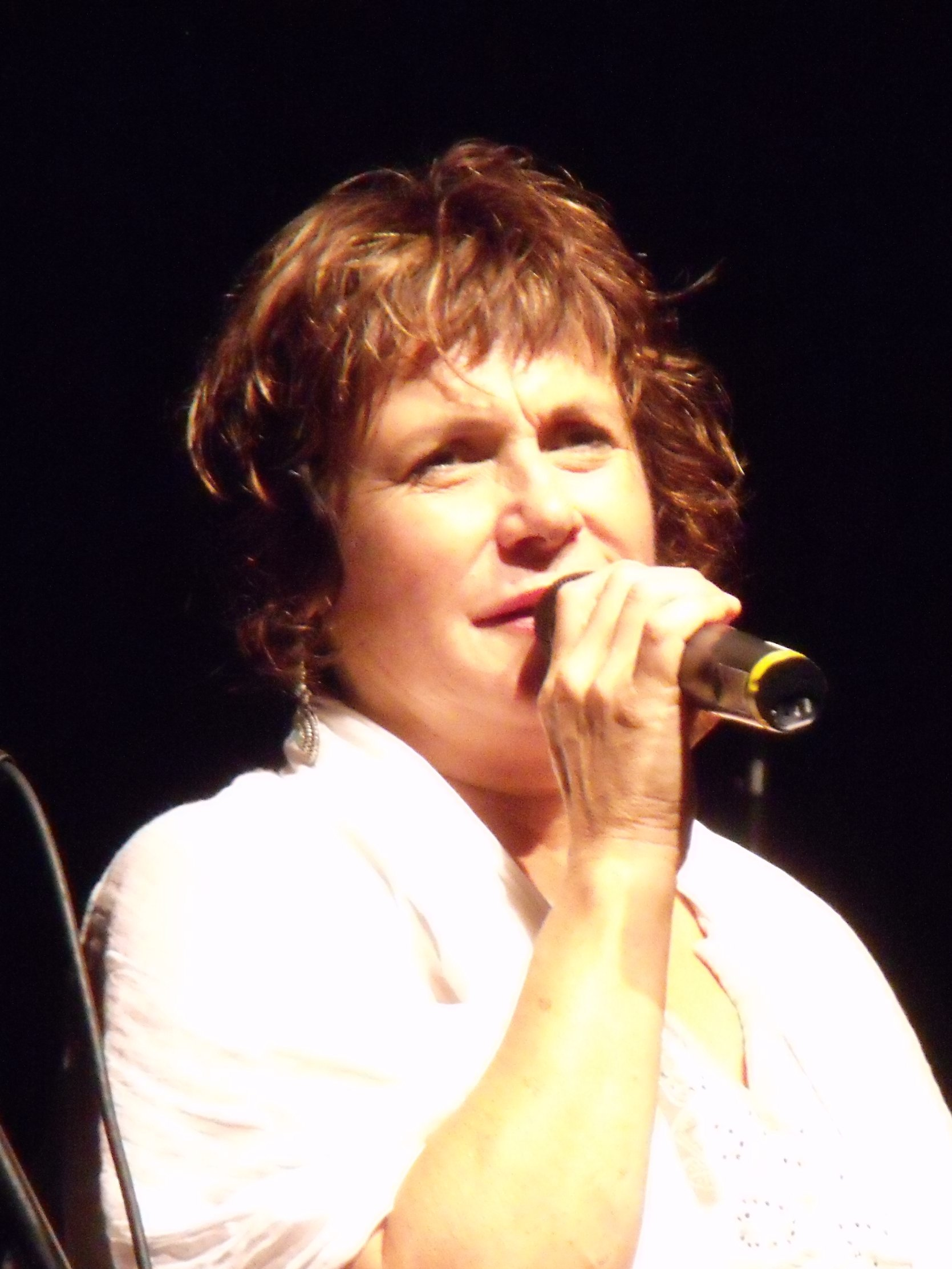
- Born: Catherine Frederica Jones; April 6, 1955 (age 71); St. John's, Newfoundland, Canada
- Occupations: Actress; comedian; writer
- Years active: 1973–present

Catherine Frederica Jones (born April 6, 1955) is a Canadian actress, comedian and writer. She is known for her work for 28 years on the Canadian television series This Hour Has 22 Minutes. Jones left the show in 2021.

== Early life and CODCO ==
Jones was born on April 6, 1955 in St. John's, Newfoundland. She was 17 when her older brother, comedian Andy Jones, put in a good word for her with the Newfoundland Traveling Theatre Company. After a summer touring with this company Cathy joined Tommy Sexton, Greg Malone, Mary Walsh, and Dyan Olsen in Toronto to look for more work in theatre and there in the fall of 1973, they formed the comedy troupe CODCO. Andy Jones and Robert Joy joined the company in early 1974.

== This Hour Has 22 Minutes ==
In 1992, Jones, comic Rick Mercer and former CODCO co-stars Mary Walsh and Greg Thomey created a new television series, This Hour Has 22 Minutes. She played many unique characters on the show, and is known for playing both men and women often at the extreme edges of gender identity. Some of her more well known characters include Mrs. Enid, Babe Bennett, Joe Crow, and one of her personal favorites, 'Love Murphy', who played a love interest with her female character in the short film Outport Lesbian. As of 2005, with the departure of Greg Thomey, Jones was the only remaining original cast member of This Hour Has 22 Minutes at the time of her departure. Jones left the show in 2021.

In 2020, Jones reprised her longtime 22 Minutes character of Miss Enid in the CBC Gem web series Broad Appeal: Living with E's.

== Other work ==
Jones has toured extensively with her one-woman shows Wedding in Texas and Me, Dad and The Hundred Boyfriends. Her film career includes the lead role in her brother Mike Jones' film Secret Nation, which aired on CBC Television, and supporting roles in How to Be Deadly and Bruce McDonald's Weirdos. A CBC Life and Times biopic titled Keeping up with Cathy Jones was produced in 2006 by Lynne Wilson, directed by Barbara Doran, and featured several of her co-stars from both CODCO and This Hour Has 22 Minutes including Greg Thomey, Rick Mercer, Greg Malone, and Andy Jones.

== Awards and accolades ==
Jones has won 18 Gemini Awards and three Canadian comedy awards for Best Writing in a Comedy Series for her work on 22 Minutes and CODCO.

== Personal life ==
In 1996, Jones married American-born painter Paul Hannon, with whom she shares their daughter Eleanor. The couple divorced in 2000. For several years after 2004, Jones had a relationship with musician and artist Tom Wilson. They have since separated. Jones' first daughter, Mara, was born in Newfoundland in 1981.

During the COVID-19 pandemic in Canada, Jones was critical of mask wearing, restrictions and vaccines. She commented that "people's health should be really in their own hands and not in the hands of the government."
