= Multiple Choice (1989 film) =

- Directed by: Debbie McGee
- Written by: Debbie McGee
- Produced by: Debbie McGee
- Starring: Lois Brown; Andy Jones; Maisie Rillie
- Cinematography: Michael Jones
- Edited by: Debbie McGee; Petra Valier
- Music by: Paul Steffler
- Production company: Newfoundland Independent Filmmaker's Cooperative
- Release date: 1989
- Running time: 22 minutes
- Country: Canada
- Language: English

Multiple Choice is a Canadian short film, directed by Debbie McGee and released in 1989. The film stars Lois Brown as Meg Harris, a shopaholic film researcher who is working on a documentary film on poverty for pompous documentary filmmaker Jack (Rick Boland) when she encounters Mr. and Mrs. Noseworthy (Andy Jones and Maisie Rillie), a couple on social assistance who challenge all of her established beliefs about participating in consumer society.

The cast also includes Eileen Moss, Mack Furlong, Edward Riche, Frank Barry, Mary-Lynn Bernard and Janis Spence.

The film was originally conceived as a documentary, before evolving into a short drama.

The film received a Genie Award nomination for Best Live Action Short Drama at the 11th Genie Awards in 1990.
