= Mary Walsh (actress) =

Canadian actress, comedian, and writer (born 1952)

Mary Walsh CM
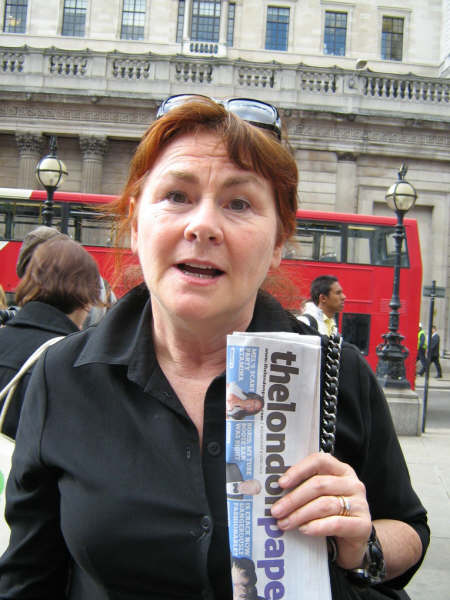
- Walsh in 2008
- Born: Mary Cynthia Walsh; May 13, 1952 (age 74); St. John's, Newfoundland and Labrador, Canada
- Occupations: Actress, comedian, writer
- Years active: 1973–present
- Awards: Canadian Screen Award for Best Supporting Actress (2021)

Mary Cynthia Walsh CM (born May 13, 1952) is a Canadian actress, comedian, and writer. She is known for her work on CODCO and This Hour Has 22 Minutes.

== Early life ==
Walsh was born in St. John's, Newfoundland and Labrador, the daughter of Mary and Leo Walsh. Leo was a merchant marine turned firefighter on commercial vessels. She is the seventh of eight children, and is of Irish ancestry. She is a past member of Girl Guides of Canada.

== Career ==
Walsh studied theatre in Toronto at Ryerson University but dropped out to work with the CODCO comedy troupe on a series of stage shows, which eventually evolved into a sketch comedy series. The CODCO series ran from 1988 to 1993 on CBC Television.

=== This Hour Has 22 Minutes ===
In 1992, she began to work with former co-star Rick Mercer and former CODCO co-stars Cathy Jones and Greg Thomey to create a new television series called This Hour Has 22 Minutes. The show was a parody of the nightly news, and poked fun at Canadian and international politics. 22 Minutes received strong ratings during its earlier seasons and Walsh's character Marg Delahunty became famous for buttonholing politicians and submitting them to satirical interviews. Usually Marg Delahunty would recite a scripted piece intended to humiliate the politician, often by providing criticism and "grandmotherly" advice. Sometimes Marg appeared as "Marg, Princess Warrior", a parody of the title character of Xena: Warrior Princess portrayed by Lucy Lawless. Walsh is also noted for her comical segment chronicling the Canadian Auto Workers Union's tense blockade of the Volvo Halifax Assembly plant in 1998. In 2007, she revived Marg Delahunty for the Royal Canadian Air Farce's 300th episode. On October 24, 2011, Walsh was once again in the spotlight as she reprised the role of Marg Delahunty conducting an ambush interview of Toronto Mayor Rob Ford at his home. Ford's reaction and alleged verbal abuse directed at a 911 operator made national headlines. She also reprised Marg, Princess Warrior for an episode of the 25th season of 22 Minutes in December 2017. Marg was reprised again for National Canadian Film Day on April 16, 2025 to "Fight in the 2025 Trade War".

In 2020, Walsh reprised her longtime 22 Minutes character of Miss Eulalia in the CBC Gem web series Broad Appeal: Living with E's, for which she received a Canadian Screen Award nomination for Best Lead Performance in a Web Program or Series at the 10th Canadian Screen Awards in 2022.

=== Other work ===
Walsh's other television work included the short-run sitcoms Dooley Gardens (1999); Hatching, Matching and Dispatching (2006); and a guest starring role as Miranda Cahill on the CBC television series Republic of Doyle. She currently has a recurring role on CBC's Little Dog. She created the CBC program Mary Walsh: Open Book, a talk show about books and literature, in 2003. Walsh revived the Fury family from Hatching, Matching, and Dispatching by writing and starring in A Christmas Fury in 2017.

Besides TV acting, she has worked on movies such as Mambo Italiano, Geraldine's Fortune, Rain, Drizzle and Fog, Buried on Sunday, The Divine Ryans, Young Triffie, Violet, and The Grand Seduction.

2004 saw Walsh host a segment on the CBC documentary series The Greatest Canadian, in which she championed the case for Sir Frederick Banting (the Nobel prize-winning discoverer of insulin) as the greatest Canadian who ever lived.

In June 2007, she hosted the Pride Toronto Gala & Awards ceremony.

On December 15, 2007, Walsh made national news with a story about her upcoming special, Nudity, Sexuality, Violence and Coarse Language, in which a large group of people who went and stripped naked standing next to St. John's Harbour in −11 °C (12 °F) weather to be filmed as a part of the show's closing. Walsh herself did not go nude.

In 2017, Walsh published her debut novel, Crying for the Moon. In 2026, Walsh published Brassy Bit of Aging Crumpet: A Memoir in Pieces, a collection of essays that detail her time growing up, her relationship with her family, and behind-the-scenes glimpses of her CBC shows, including This Hour Has 22 Minutes.

=== Directing ===
Walsh made her feature directorial debut with the 2007 movie Young Triffie. She was the first Newfoundlander in six years to have a film in general release across Canada.

== Personal life ==
Walsh has battled alcoholism. The Toronto Star reported that the end of CODCO coincided with the end of Walsh's active alcoholism, with Walsh stating "which was a damn good thing because I could have never done This Hour Has 22 Minutes if I'd been drinking."

== Honours ==
=== Performing arts ===
She won Best Supporting Actress at the Atlantic Film Festival in 1992 for her performance in Mike Jones' Secret Nation.

On November 4, 2006, Walsh and Ed MacDonald picked up a Gemini Award for the best writing in a comedy or variety program for their work in Hatching, Matching and Dispatching.

She has won 18 Gemini Awards. She won the Canadian Screen Award for Best Supporting Actress at the 9th Canadian Screen Awards in 2021, for the film Happy Place.

Walsh received a Governor General's Performing Arts Award for Lifetime Artistic Achievement, Canada's highest honour in the performing arts, in 2012.

At the 2025 Atlantic International Film Festival, she won the Joan Orenstein & David Renton Award for Outstanding Performance in Acting, for her performance in Dancing on the Elephant.

=== Charity and activism ===
A sufferer of macular degeneration, she has served from time to time as a spokesperson for the Canadian National Institute for the Blind (CNIB).

In 1993, Walsh was chosen to deliver the prestigious Graham Spry lecture which was broadcast nationally on CBC Radio.

In 1994, Walsh addressed the United Nations Global Conference on Development in New York. She has also served as a spokesperson for Oxfam, Canada's human rights campaign, and in 2010 received Oxfam's Spirit of Change Award, in recognition of her years of dedication to eradicating poverty and ensuring public services for all.

On May 29, 1998, Mary Walsh received an Honorary Doctor of Laws from Trent University.

McGill University honoured Walsh with an honorary doctorate during the November 2008 convocation ceremony. Her speech to the class of 2008 focused on political satire.

=== National Honours ===
Mary Walsh was appointed as a Member of the Order of Canada on April 27, 2000. This gave her the Post Nominal Letters "CM" for Life. She was awarded the Canadian Version of the Queen Elizabeth II Golden Jubilee Medal in 2002. She was awarded the Canadian Version of the Queen Elizabeth II Diamond Jubilee Medal in 2012.

== Filmography ==
=== Film ===
Film
Year	Title	Role	Notes
1976	Dolly Cake	N/A	Short film Writer
1983	Stations		
1986	The Adventure of Faustus Bidgood	Heady Nolan	Production manager Casting director
1992	Buried on Sunday	2nd Biker	
1992	Secret Nation	Oona Vokey	
1998	Extraordinary Visitor	Marietta	
1998	Rain Drizzle and Fog	Herself	Documentary
1999	New Waterford Girl	Cookie Pottie	
1999	The Divine Ryans	Aunt Phil Ryans	
2000	Violet	Violet O'Brien	
2001	The Frank Truth	Herself	Documentary
2001	Tommy... A Family Portrait	Herself	Documentary
2003	Behind the Red Door	Anna	
2003	Mambo Italiano	Lina Paventi	
2004	Geraldine's Fortune	Rose Owens	
2005	Bailey's Billion$	N/A	Co-writer
2007	Young Triffie	Aunt Millie Bishop	Also known as:Young Triffie's Been Made Away With; Director; Producer
2009	Crackie	Bride	
2009	Grown Up Movie Star	Receptionist	
2010	Poor No More	Herself/host	
2012	Imaginary Heroine		Short film Writer
2013	The Grand Seduction	Vera	
2013	Incident at Elysian Fields	Yvonne	Short film
2014	How to Be Deadly	Dot Power	
2015	Closet Monster	Allison	
2016	The Inn Of Olde	Sadie	Short Film
2019	Radical		Short film
2019	Apocalyptic Rant	Marg Delahunty	Short film
2020	Happy Place	Mildred	
2021	Dad and the Fridge Box	N/A	Writer; Producer
2023	Sweetland	Queenie	
2024	Deaner '89	May	
2025	Dancing on the Elephant	Edna	
2026	Purgatory	Mrs. Nash	

=== Television ===
Television
Year	Title	Role	Notes
1974	Cod on a Stick	Various	
1975	Peep Show	Various	Part of CODCO
1978	The Root Seller	Various	6 episodes Writer - 6 episodes
1980	Up at Ours	Verna Ball	Miniseries
1980-1983	Wonderful Grand Band	Various	
1986–1989	CODCO	Various	35 episodes Writer - 35 episodes Producer - 21 episodes
1992	The Boys of St. Vincent: 15 Years Later	Lenora Pardy	Miniseries
1993–2013	This Hour Has 22 Minutes	Various	122 Episodes
1995-1997	The Adventures of Dudley the Dragon	Willomena / Princess	3 episodes
1996	Genie Awards	Herself/host	TV special
1997	The New Adventures of Robin Hood	Police Guard #1	Season 2 episode 9: "Outlaw Express"
1997	Major Crime	Patty Reckles	TV movie
1998	Emily of New Moon	Miss Pick	Season 2 episode 6: "By the Rivers of Babylon"
1998–1999	The Rosie O'Donnell Show	N/A	Writer - 193 Episodes
1999	Lexx	Heedia	Season 2 episode 13: "Twilight"
1999	Dooley Gardens	Marilyn Benoit	7 Episodes
1999	Life and Times	Herself	Season 4 episode 1: "Mary Walsh: Princess Warrior
2000	Our Daily Bread	Edna Barkhouse	TV movie
2002	The Joke's on Us: 50 Years of CBC Satire	Herself	Documentary
2002	Bleacher Bums	Rose	TV movie
2002	Random Passage	Mrs. Armstrong	Miniseries
2003	The Strategic Humour Initiative	Herself/co-host	
2003-2004	Mary Walsh: Open Book	Host	Writer; Producer
2004	The Greatest Canadian	Herself	Advocate for Sir Frederick Banting
2005–2006	Hatching, Matching and Dispatching	Mamie Lou Furey	Writer; Producer
2006	The Wind in the Willows	Washerwoman	TV movie
2007	Who Do you Think You Are?	Herself	Episode 7: "Mary Walsh"
2008	Sophie	Sarah Sloane	Season 1 episode 12: "Read the Signs"
2008	Gossip	Carolyn Johnson Wright	TV movie
2008	The Quality of Life	Katherine Greenborne	TV movie
2009	Murdoch Mysteries	Sally Smoot	Season 2 episode 6: "Shades of Grey"
2010	Great Canadian Books	Herself	2 episodes
2010–2014	Republic of Doyle	Miranda Cahill	2 episodes
2012	Little Mosque on the Prairie	Mayor Glenda Beckford	Season 6 episode 8: "Finders Weepers"
2014–2016	Sensitive Skin	Sarah Thorn	2 episodes
2015	Rookie Blue	Odelle	Season 6 episode 3: "Uprising"
2016	Slasher	Verna McBride	Season 1: The Executioner; Episode 1: "An Eye for an Eye"
2017	A Christmas Fury	Mamie Lou Fur	TV movie Writer
2018	Little Dog	Tucker	12 episodes
2020	Hudson & Rex	Vicky Gumble	Season 2 episode 13: "In Pod We Trust"
2020	Canada's Drag Race	Herself/Guest Host	Season 1 episode 5: "Snatch Game"
2020–2021	Broad Appeal: Living with E's	Miss Eulalia	
2021–present	The Missus Downstairs	The Missus	Writer; Producer; Director
2024	Resident Alien	Patty Baker	2 episodes

== Bibliography ==
Crying for the Moon: A Novel (April 18, 2017 HarperCollins, ISBN 9781443410380)

Brassy Bit of Aging Crumpet: A Memoir in Pieces (March 31, 2026 HarperCollins, ISBN 9781443471978)
