= Greg Thomey =

Canadian comedian (born 1961)

- Born: May 8, 1961 (age 64); St. John's, Newfoundland and Labrador, Canada
- Occupations: Comedian; actor; playwright

Greg Thomey (born May 8, 1961) is a Canadian comedian, actor and playwright and a founding member of the long-running television program This Hour Has 22 Minutes. He has been a recipient of numerous Gemini Awards.

Born in St. John's, Newfoundland, Thomey has been part of the comedy scene there for many years beginning as a writer and performer with the comedy troupe CODCO and as an actor and playwright.

He played the role of Brother Glackin in the film The Boys of St. Vincent. His original stage play Hanlon House, which was first produced by the Resource Centre for the Arts in St. John's, went on to be produced as a short film, winning the Best Short Film award at the Atlantic Film Festival in 1992, and the Local Heroes Award at the Yorkton Film Festival in 1993. Hanlon House was aired on CBC-TV's Arts program later that year.

In 1992, he began to work with Cathy Jones, Rick Mercer and Mary Walsh to create a new television series, which became This Hour Has 22 Minutes. Thomey played anchorperson Frank MacMillan and created many memorable characters such as Jerry Boyle (of the Newfoundland Separation Federation) and Eddie from "That Show Sucked". He left the show as an on-screen performer in 2005 but he returned to This Hour as a writer for the 2013/2014 season.

In addition to his work on 22 Minutes, in 1996 Thomey also starred in a six-part series called Daily Tips for Modern Living that aired on CBC TV.

Thomey was not hired back for 22 Minutes in August 2018, as several other long-time talent such as Shaun Majumder and multiple veteran writers were also not hired back.

In 2023, Thomey portrayed the character of Uncle Huey in the music video for Adam Baldwin's song Lighthouse in Little Lorraine.

== Personal life ==
In 2014, he was a co-complainant in a legal case in Nova Scotia in which a couple was accused of defrauding several investors including Thomey.
