= Gull Tickle =

Strait in Newfoundland and Labrador, Canada

Gull Tickle is a channel located in Newfoundland and Labrador. Tickle is a term from Newfoundland English that means tight channel. It is referenced in the film Rare Birds.
