= Stations (film) =

- Directed by: William D. MacGillivray
- Screenplay by: Michael Jones; William D. MacGillivray; Lionel Simmons
- Starring: Michael Jones
- Cinematography: Lionel Simmons
- Edited by: William MacGillivray; Lionel Simmons
- Production company: Picture Plant
- Release date: September 11, 1983 (TIFF)
- Running time: 86 minutes
- Country: Canada
- Language: English

Stations is a Canadian comedy-drama film, directed by William D. MacGillivray and released in 1983. The film stars Michael Jones as Tom Murphy, a former Roman Catholic priest turned television journalist; after undergoing a crisis of faith when his deep questioning of his old friend Harry (Rick Boland) in an interview leads to Harry's suicide, he is assigned to undertake a train trip across Canada to interview various everyday people he meets at train stations across the country.

Featuring a mix of professional and non-professional actors, the cast included Libby Davies, Patricia Kipping, Joel Sapp, Maisie Rillie, Beth McTavish, Claudette Sapp, Graham Hayward and Mary Walsh.

The film premiered at the 1983 Festival of Festivals, but was distributed primarily via pay TV rather than commercial theatrical distribution. It was later screened at the 1984 Festival of Festivals as part of Front & Centre, a special retrospective program of artistically and culturally significant films from throughout the history of Canadian cinema.

== Critical response ==
Jay Scott of The Globe and Mail wrote that "Unfortunately, the director of Stations, William D. MacGillivray, is not attracted by those interviewed - many of whom are wonderfully funny - but by the interviewer, a humorless middle-class dolt with a tedious mid-life identity crisis."

In his 2003 book A Century of Canadian Cinema, Gerald Pratley wrote that "as most of the participants in this film belong to the lively, outspoken school of Newfoundland comedy, there are quite naturally a great many laughs on the journey, and the scenery is marvellous."

Wyndham Wise described the film as reminiscent of early Wim Wenders, and wrote that the film was "an absorbing examination of distinctly Canadian angst and the modes by which our culture expresses it".
