= The Queen of Paradise's Garden =

2009 children's book by Andy Jones and illustrated by Darka Erdelji

The Queen of Paradise's Garden:A Traditional Newfoundland Tale
- Author: Andy Jones
- Illustrator: Darka Erdelji
- Published: Running the Goat Books and Broadsides
- Publication date: 2009
- Pages: 44
- ISBN: 978-0-9737578-3-5
- OCLC: 317354369

The Queen of Paradise's Garden:A Traditional Newfoundland Tale is a children's book by Andy Jones and illustrated by Darka Erdelji. Published in 2009 by Running the Goat Books and Broadsides, the story is adapted from stories 29 and 30 in Folktales of Newfoundland.

== Summary ==
=== Characters ===
- Bill, Tom, and Jack. A set of triplets who, concerned about their elderly parents, go on a quest to find magical fruit that will make them young again. Through the efforts of the youngest triplet, Jack, they are ultimately successful.
- Old Blind Pew (Later, Young Blind Pew). A basket-seller who helps the boys and tells them about the fruit. After Jack gives him some of the fruit, he becomes young and regains his eyesight.
- Queen of Paradise is the queen of a faraway land. In her garden grows the magical fruits that the boys are seeking. After discovering the theft of the fruit, she tracks down the boys and, eventually, marries Jack.

== Reception ==
The Queen of Paradise was widely praised for the way that reviewers felt Jones had incorporated the Newfoundland dialect into the story. Newfoundland & Labrador Studies spoke positively of the way the reviewer felt Jones had catered to both children and adult audiences. Canadian Children's Book News also praised the illustrations, with the reviewer describing them as reminiscent of the work of Stéphane Poulin.
