= Sid Hammerback =

- CSI: NY character
- First appearance: "Dancing with the Fishes"
- Last appearance: "Today Is Life"
- Portrayed by: Robert Joy
- City: New York City

In-universe information
- Occupation: Doctor
- Position: Medical Examiner
- Duration: 2005–2013
- Seasons: 2, 3, 4, 5, 6, 7, 8, 9

Dr. Sid Hammerback is a fictional character on the CBS crime drama CSI: NY, portrayed by Robert Joy.

== Background ==
Known for the signature breakaway reading glasses he uses in the morgue (thought to be Clic Reading Glasses), Hammerback is a New York City medical examiner described as an "off-the-charts genius" who traded in a career as a chef to become a medical examiner, although in episode 509, "The Box", he states that he has been working in the same position for 29 years and 4,846 cases. He has a habit of over talking and oversharing, and has offered commentary on such unusual behaviors as threesomes and necrophilia–much to the unease of his predecessor Sheldon Hawkes, who, in one episode, refers to Sid's commentary as "going to that creepy place" (episode 301, "People With Money"). Despite any eccentricities on his part, Hammerback sincerely cares for the well-being of his coworkers; he invited Mac Taylor to join his family for their Thanksgiving festivities so the taciturn CSI would not have to spend another holiday alone. He has apparently either known or worked with Mac, Hawkes, and ME Peyton Driscoll for an unspecified number of years (episode 205, "Dancing with the Fishes"). He is also known to be hardworking, as shown in episode 707, "Hide Sight", where he returns to work immediately despite having been sent to the ER after being exposed to an exploding bullet during an autopsy.

Hammerback nearly dies from a severe allergic reaction to a meatball gyros sandwich he ate in episode 317, "The Ride-In", and is saved by the timely intervention of Stella Bonasera, who administers rescue breathing, CPR, and a shot of epinephrine from the first aid kit. When Stella expresses concern that she may have exposed him to HIV, he comforts her, more worried about her own emotional well-being. "I'm sorry I scared you," he tells her contritely. In episode 502, "Page Turner", he nearly dies once again, this time from prolonged contact with a murder victim who had died of radiation poisoning. However, he undergoes heavy treatment at the hospital and is shown to be fine at the end of the episode, with a few of his friends and co-workers visiting him.

Hammerback, an American of partial Lithuanian ancestry from one of his grandmothers (episode 519, "Communication Breakdown"), is currently married with two daughters, one about college age (episode 302, "Not What It Looks Like"; episode 317, "The Ride In"). Sid has been divorced at least once (episode 304, "Hung Out to Dry") and celebrated by getting incredibly drunk and falling down a flight of stairs, though he claims he "didn't feel a thing". In episode 418, "Admissions," he mentions to Mac that he occasionally holds a curiosity for what it would be like to take a swig of hydrofluoric acid. When Mac jokingly responds that he himself wonders about doing a live autopsy on himself, Sid genuinely agrees before realizing, slightly crestfallen, that Mac is messing with him. In episode 419, "Personal Foul," he mentions that he enjoys fencing, and in episode 519, "Communication Breakdown," it is shown that he understands and speaks at least to some very small degree Lithuanian. His level of fluency is unknown.

He was close friends with former coroner Marty Pino and his wife, Anabel, and was the one who convinced the two to marry (episode 518, "Point of No Return"). He also had the task of firing Pino after he was found forging overtime slips to aid his gambling and debt problems. He was visibly upset when Anabel was murdered, finding himself unable to conduct the autopsy on her. He also stopped a suicidal Pino, when he was about to be arrested for running drugs and creating heroin from peoples' bodies, a practice which led to Anabel's death, by turning up unexpectedly at the scene of the arrest. Sid asks Pino how many victims there were and is struck with horror as he hears the number, which the viewer never finds out, and asks the police to "get him out of my face".

== Millionaire ==
In the season 8 episode "The Ripple Effect", written by co-executive producer Trey Callaway, Sid's absence from work delays an autopsy and angers Mac Taylor. When Sid returns, Jo Danville learns the reason for the absence: a patent Sid had obtained for one of his inventions has been bought for $27 million.

Callaway, "wanting to tell the next chapter in that story", continues that story arc in the ninth season episode "Command+P", where Sid is discovered by Jo to be the anonymous "Guardian Angel" who has been surprising with million-dollar checks "the loved ones of victims" in cases Sid had worked. Jo subsequently learns in confidence that Sid has non-Hodgkin's lymphoma. It was showrunner Pam Veasey who suggested that the checks are prompted by Sid's illness.
