= Broad Appeal: Living with E's =

2020 Canadian comedy web series

Broad Appeal: Living with E's is a Canadian comedy web series, which premiered in 2020 on CBC Gem. The series stars Cathy Jones and Mary Walsh as Enid and Eulalia, their longtime sketch characters from This Hour Has 22 Minutes.

In the first season, Enid and Eulalia offered "pre-posthumous lifestyle advice", including their thoughts on the COVID-19 pandemic, while in the second season they undertake a train journey across Canada.

Walsh received a Canadian Screen Award nomination for Best Lead Performance in a Web Program or Series at the 10th Canadian Screen Awards in 2022.

== Episodes ==
=== Season 1 (2020) ===
No. overall	No. in season	Title	Directed by	Written by	Original release date
1	1	"Dress Store"	Unknown	Unknown	December 3, 2020
2	2	"The Young"	Unknown	Unknown	December 3, 2020
3	3	"Seniors Dating"	Unknown	Unknown	December 3, 2020
4	4	"Being Alone"	Unknown	Unknown	December 3, 2020
5	5	"Canada 150"	Unknown	Unknown	December 3, 2020
6	6	"Home Décor"	Unknown	Unknown	December 3, 2020

=== Season 2 (2021) ===
No. overall	No. in season	Title	Directed by	Written by	Original release date
7	1	"What Have We Got to Lose"	Unknown	Unknown	December 22, 2021
8	2	"Next Stop Toronto"	Unknown	Unknown	December 22, 2021
9	3	"Chinook"	Unknown	Unknown	December 22, 2021
10	4	"Stop That Train!"	Unknown	Unknown	December 22, 2021
11	5	"Meeting the Elders of the Elders"	Unknown	Unknown	December 22, 2021
12	6	"Home Again Home Again Jiggity Jig"	Unknown	Unknown	December 22, 2021
