= Unspoken (CSI: NY) =

- CSI: NY episode
- Episode no.: Season 9 Episode 4
- Directed by: Duane Clark
- Written by: Pam Veasey
- Original air date: October 19, 2012

Guest appearances
- Neal McDonough; Jeff Hephner; Jenna Ortega

Episode chronology
← Previous "2,918 Miles"	Next → "Misconceptions"
- CSI: NY season 9

"Unspoken" is an episode of American crime drama CSI: NY. The episode aired on October 19, 2012, on CBS. The episode is unique because there isn't any dialogue within the first half of the episode, but there is a soundtrack from American punk rock band Green Day, consisting of songs from the group's ¡Uno!, ¡Dos!, ¡Tré! album trilogy. The episode was well received by critics and was watched by 9.48 million viewers. The episode has a politician being shot, the shooter dumping the gun, children finding it and one of them dying. It also has Mac Taylor's struggles after his shooting in the previous season.

== Synopsis ==
A man shoots a politician at a political rally where Lindsay is injured. Flack chases the shooter and finds a little girl shot by her friend after they played with the tossed gun. The child dies in his arms. Mac is seen having difficulty remembering words and colors as a result of his previous injuries. The CSIs learn that the gun belonged to the politician who was shot. He admits that he never reported the gun stolen. The shooter visits Lindsay in the hospital because she saw his face during the attack. He plans to kill her but spares her when he sees a drawing by her daughter. The CSIs later learn that the politician wasn't the target. Instead it was a teacher who was responsible for getting the shooter relieved of his job at his school because she thought his caring behavior was inappropriate. When interviewed by the police he claims to have never hurt a child, not realising that his gun was used to shoot a girl after he tossed it in a dumpster.

== Production ==
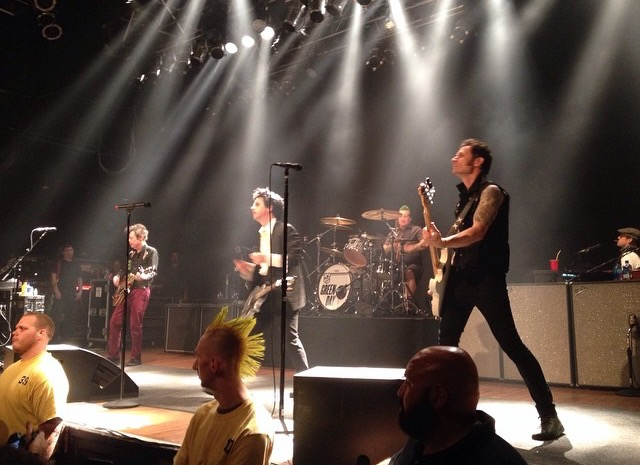
Green Day's music was featured in the episode.

When announcing that the episode was using Green Day's new music, writer and executive producer Pam Veasey said "My ultimate goal was to tell a story without dialogue, and Green Day's music and lyrics beautifully accompanied the visuals making it a very special episode." Green Day commented that they "were stoked" when they "found out CSI: NY wanted to use our music instead of dialogue to narrate the first few acts of the episode." Green Day also commented, "It's the first time something like this has been done on the series, and we are blown away with what we've seen." In an interview with TV Guide, Veasey told Adam Bryant that she has considered doing an episode completely without dialogue but scrapped the idea.

When actor Neal McDonough was announced to guest star in the episode they billed his character as the "ultimate politician". They also announced that he would be guesting in the fourth episode of the ninth season.

== Reception ==
Jay Tilles writing for KROQ called the episode "intense". Adam Bryant of TV Guide wrote that the episode was "appropriately titled". Paul Metcalf, who was reviewing CSI: NY's final season billed this episode as a "highlight".

A reviewer for TwoCentsTV wrote, "I was just starting to get into the non-verbal communication thing, with Green Day's music as a backdrop, when the episode seemed to ditch that for its usual wordy expositions and explanations. Still, the tracks I did get to hear are awesome. Glad I'm a fan of Green Day."

A TV Equals review claimed, "The latest episode of CSI: NY, somewhat appropriately entitled "Unspoken", was what I tend to think of as a "stunt" episode, by which I mean an episode of a show that seeks to set itself apart from typical episodes of the show at hand in some significant and noticeable way. More often than not, it involves a name guest star, but a "stunt" episode can also indicate a change in format that differs from the usual approach."
