= CODCO =

- Starring: Tommy Sexton; Greg Malone; Cathy Jones; Mary Walsh; Andy Jones
- Country of origin: Canada
- No. of seasons: 5
- No. of episodes: 63

Production
- Production locations: Newfoundland, Halifax, Nova Scotia (Production Studio)
- Running time: 22 minutes

Original release
- Network: CBC
- Release: 1988 – 1993

CODCO is a Canadian comedy troupe from Newfoundland, best known for a sketch comedy series that aired on CBC Television from 1988 to 1993.

Founded as a theatrical revue in 1973, CODCO drew on the province's cultural history of self-deprecating "Newfie" humour, frequently focusing on the cod fishing industry. The troupe's name was an abbreviation of "Cod Company".

Following the end of CODCO, two of the troupe's core members and an occasional guest collaborator, as well as some of their sketch characters, moved on to the new series This Hour Has 22 Minutes.

== Roots ==
In 1973, Tommy Sexton and Diane Olsen wrote a comedic show about Canadian stereotypes of Newfoundlanders, Cod on a Stick. Originally launched in Toronto, the cast consisted of Sexton, Olsen, Greg Malone, Cathy Jones, Mary Walsh and Paul Sametz. The show subsequently opened in St. John's, with Scott Strong replacing Sametz, and then toured the province with Robert Joy replacing Strong. When the show was taped by the National Film Board in 1974, Andy Jones appeared in the cast as well.

Sexton, Olsen, Malone, Cathy Jones, Andy Jones, Walsh and Joy subsequently performed in the show Sickness, Death and Beyond the Grave in 1974. In 1975, all except Malone, who was on a brief sabbatical to study at the Toronto Dance Theatre, appeared in What Do You Want to See the Harbour For, Anyway?; later that year, Malone rewrote the show as Das Capital.

In the fall of that year, the troupe compiled bits from their earlier shows for a week-long performance in Philadelphia, which was titled Philadelphia: Somewhere on the Hungry Coast of Newfoundland. That show was also taped for broadcast on CBC Television's Peep Show, as Festering Forefathers and Running Sons.

Joy and Olsen left the troupe in 1976.

Mike Jones, Cathy and Andy Jones' brother, was not a performing member of the troupe, but was associated with them as a frequent director of their stage shows.

Over the next number of years, the troupe's members only rarely worked together as CODCO, but often collaborated with each other individually on various projects, including the film The Adventure of Faustus Bidgood and the television series The Root Seller, The Wonderful Grand Band and The S and M Comic Book. Greg Thomey and Paul Steffler also frequently collaborated with the CODCO members on various projects.

== TV series ==
In 1986, Walsh, Sexton, Malone, Cathy Jones and Andy Jones reunited as CODCO for a benefit show in St. John's. Sexton and Malone had just completed the successful and popular S and M Comic Book series of CBC Television specials, and the CBC was interested in developing further projects with the duo — after the success of the CODCO reunion show, the troupe decided to work on a CODCO series.

CODCO began production in 1986, and debuted on the CBC in 1988. Although not regular contributors, Thomey and Joy sometimes appeared on CODCO as guest performers.

For most of its run, CODCO aired as the latter half of a one-hour sketch comedy block, immediately following The Kids in the Hall.

== Segments and characters ==
CODCO shared several characteristics with The Kids in the Hall, including the presence of openly gay members and the use of drag — although where The Kids in the Hall often revelled in absurdist humour, CODCO's sketches were typically based around social commentary and satire, often with a strongly political edge. Their sketches were also strongly reflective of the troupe's background on the stage, sometimes playing more as humorous character or scene studies than as conventional sketch comedy.

Recurring characters included the Friday Night Girls (Walsh and Jones), a homely, dateless pair of female friends whose Friday nights rarely consisted of anything more exciting than riding the Metrobus; Dakey Dunn (Walsh), an unexpectedly insightful macho lout; Frank Arsenpuffin (Andy Jones), a hapless talk show host faced with a succession of horrifying guests; Marg at the Mental (Sexton), a patient in a psychiatric hospital; and Jerome and Duncan (Sexton and Malone), a flamboyant pair of gay lawyers. Thomey sometimes appeared on the show as Newfoundland separatist Jerry Boyle, a character he would later reprise on This Hour Has 22 Minutes.

Another recurring sketch, House of Budgell, was essentially an ongoing soap opera set in a boarding house. Wake of the Week focused on the Furlong sisters, a pair of elderly spinsters who regularly crashed funeral wakes, while The Byrd Family focused on a family of hardened criminals. Another of the show's most famous sketches parodied Canadian literary icon Anne of Green Gables; instead of Prince Edward Island, Anne lived in a dreary Newfoundland fishing outport called Green Gut. In another, a Newfoundlander brings his girlfriend from Toronto home to meet his parents; the sketch escalates to the brink of violence as the parents tried to explain why the Mi'kmaq, not Newfoundlanders, were responsible for the extinction of the Beothuk.

Malone performed a number of celebrity impersonations, including Margaret Thatcher and Canadian television journalist Barbara Frum, while Sexton did recurring impersonations of Barbara Walters and Tammy Faye Bakker. In one famous sketch, Malone as Frum moderated a debate between Jones as a gay teacher who had been fired from his job for testing HIV-positive and Sexton as Clarabelle Otterhead, the homophobic president of a lobby group called Citizens Outraged by Weird Sex (or COWS). The troupe also parodied the conventions of television news through mock local newscasts; in one such sketch, a racist anchor character loudly blamed Africa for AIDS: "It's all your fault, it's all your fault. Nah nah nah nah nah nah. You're black, you're black, take your dirty bugs back. You're screwing green monkeys and giving it to our junkies. We give you all our foreign aid, and all we gets back is AIDS, AIDS, AIDS."

Parody music videos were also a frequent feature of the show. In a transparent spoof of Quebec pop idol Mitsou, Cathy Jones played Jansu, a shallow, self-promoting pop singer who tried to be topical with lyrics such as "it's a political world/so separate your garbage!". Sexton parodied body image as Dusty Springroll, who sang an ode to the fashionability of bulimia. Figures such as Anne Murray and Bruce Cockburn were parodied in commercials for compilation albums with satirical lyrics set to the melodies of real songs by the artists, while another sketch was set in a café holding a Leonard Cohen impersonation contest.

== The end of CODCO ==
In 1991, a sketch was filmed for CODCO called "Pleasant Priests in Conversation", which involved three Roman Catholic priests discussing their sexual experiences; it was a reference to the then-ongoing Mount Cashel Orphanage child abuse controversy. The CBC refused to air the sketch. As a result, Andy Jones quit the show in protest. The series carried on for two more years before it came to a close in 1993. Ironically, the CBC subsequently aired "Pleasant Priests" in a CODCO Uncensored special just a few months after the regular series ended.

Following the end of CODCO, Walsh and Cathy Jones worked with Thomey and Rick Mercer to create This Hour Has 22 Minutes. Several CODCO characters, including Dakey Dunn and Jerry Boyle, were carried over to the new series.

Sexton died in 1993 of complications from AIDS.

Malone ran as a New Democratic Party candidate in the St. John's West by-election in 2000, losing narrowly to Loyola Hearn. Malone ran as the Green Party candidate for the riding of Avalon for the 2019 federal election.
