= Michael Jones (film director) =

Canadian film director and screenwriter

- Born: March 28, 1944; St. John's, Newfoundland
- Died: March 14, 2018 (aged 73); St. John's, Newfoundland and Labrador, Canada
- Occupations: Film director; Cinematographer; Screenwriter

Michael Jones (1944 – March 14, 2018) was a Canadian film director and screenwriter based in Newfoundland. He is known for his films which depicted the island's culture and humour.

== Early life ==
Jones was born on March 28, 1944, the son of Agnes Dobbin and Michael Jones Sr. He was a brother to satirical Newfoundland writers/actors Andy Jones and Cathy Jones. Jones attended St. Bonaventure's College, graduating in 1962. He joined the Christian Brothers and studied at New York's Catholic Iona College. He earned a master's degree at Notre Dame.

== Career ==
Jones took a position as a teacher in St. John's, Newfoundland, where he became involved in filmmaking. He left the Brothers in 1969. He left teaching to train with the National Film Board of Canada's Atlantic Studio in 1974, and was a founding member of the Newfoundland Independent Filmmaker's Co-op in 1975. Along with his brother Andy he created the film The Adventure of Faustus Bidgood, which was filmed over a period of ten years. He also directed Secret Nation and Congratulations. He was nominated for two Genie Awards for Faustus Bidgood, including Best Original Screenplay and Best Editing.

Mike Jones performed minor roles in all of his films, including the French teacher in Faustus Bidgood. He provided the voice of Leo Cryptus in his film Secret Nation, a sequel to Faustus, and played the lead role in William D. MacGillivray's 1983 film Stations. Although he was not a performing member of CODCO - the long-lived comedy troupe which included siblings Andy and Cathy - Jones directed and edited the company's short films including "Dolly Cake", "Sisters of the Silver Scalpel" and "Ship Inn Man".

== Death ==
Jones died March 14, 2018, at the Health Sciences Centre in St. John's, Newfoundland.

Smash & Grab: The Rebel Lens of Mike Jones, a documentary film by Justin Simms about Jones and his filmmaking career, premiered at the 2026 Atlantic International Film Festival, alongside a retrospective screening of Faustus Bidgood.

== Filmography ==
=== As director ===
- Dolly Cake (1976)
- The Adventure of Faustus Bidgood (1986)
- Secret Nation (1992)
- Congratulations (2000)

=== As cinematographer ===
- Dolly Cake (1976)
- Linda Joy (1985)
- The Adventure of Faustus Bidgood (1986)
- Opposing Force (1986)
- Finding Mary March (1988)
- Multiple Choice (1989)
- Anchor Zone (1994)
- When Ponds Freeze Over (1998)
