= Extraordinary Visitor =

- Directed by: John W. Doyle
- Written by: John W. Doyle
- Produced by: Paul Pope; Jennice Ripley
- Starring: Raoul Bhaneja; Mary Walsh; Andy Jones
- Cinematography: Brian R.R. Hebb
- Edited by: Lara Mazur
- Music by: Eric Cadesky; Nick Dyer
- Production company: Film East Inc.
- Release date: September 2, 1998 (MWFF)
- Running time: 87 minutes
- Country: Canada
- Language: English

Extraordinary Visitor is a 1998 Canadian comedy film, directed by John W. Doyle. The film stars Raoul Bhaneja as John the Baptist, sent on a mission from God to find a reason to spare the world from destruction. Ending up in St. John's, Newfoundland and Labrador, he becomes embroiled in the lives of Rick (Andy Jones), a junk salesman and conspiracy theorist, and his wife Marietta (Mary Walsh), a local public access talk show host.

The film also stars Janet Michael as Mary, Rick Boland as Pope Innocent XVI, Greg Malone as Cardinal Vignetti, Bryan Hennessey as Archbishop Devine and Jordan Canning as Alison, and features cameo appearances by Mark Critch as a hot dog vendor and Pamela Wallin as a newscaster.

The film premiered at the Montreal World Film Festival on September 2, 1998, and was screened at the 1998 Toronto International Film Festival, the Cinéfest Sudbury International Film Festival, the Vancouver International Film Festival and the Atlantic Film Festival before going into general theatrical release in early 1999.

The film won the Audience Award at the Dances With Films festival in 1999, and composers Eric Cadesky and Nick Dyer received a Genie Award nomination for Best Original Score at the 20th Genie Awards. It was broadcast by CBC Television on December 30, 1999.
