= Greg Malone (actor) =

Canadian impressionist and actor (born 1948)

- Born: David Gregory Malone; October 19, 1948 (age 77); St. John's, Newfoundland
- Occupations: film, television and stage actor, political activist
- Known for: CODCO, The S and M Comic Book
- Political party: Green

David Gregory Malone (born October 19, 1948 in St. John's, Newfoundland) is a Canadian impressionist and actor. He is well known for the CODCO television series and his impersonations of Barbara Frum, Jean Chrétien, and Queen Elizabeth II.

== Career ==
Prior to CODCO, Malone wrote and performed in a number of shows for CBC Television, including The Wonderful Grand Band, The Root Seller and The S and M Comic Book, and appeared in the film The Adventure of Faustus Bidgood.

After the death of his CODCO co-star Tommy Sexton in 1993, he devoted some years of his life to raising awareness of HIV and AIDS, including writing, directing and appearing in a training film for health care professionals. He also directed a docudrama film, The Untold Story of the Suffragists of Newfoundland, in which he appeared as Sir Richard Squires, and acted in the films Rare Birds, Extraordinary Visitor, Messiah from Montreal and Heyday!. He also appeared in a one-man special for Comedy Now!, Pocket Queen, which won an award at the 1999 WorldFest-Houston International Film Festival. More recently, he has had a recurring guest role in Republic of Doyle. He appeared as orphanage headmaster Mr. Hill in the Irish-Canadian co-production Maudie, widely released in 2017.

Along with Sexton and their CODCO co-star Andy Jones, Malone was a recipient of the Earle Grey Award, the lifetime achievement award of Canadian television's Gemini Awards, in 2002.

His first memoir, You Better Watch Out, was published in 2009 by Knopf Canada. He released a book in 2012 entitled Don't Tell the Newfoundlanders: The True Story of Newfoundland's Confederation with Canada, which is a look at how Newfoundland became a province of Canada in 1949. Malone is openly gay. He is also an amateur theologian.

== Filmography ==
=== Films ===
Film
Year	Title	Role	Notes
1976	Dolly Cake	(Unnamed role)	(Short film)
1998	Extraordinary Visitor	Cardinal Vignetti	
2001	Rare Birds	Buster Bartlett	
2009	Grande Dame	Grande Dame	(Short)
2014	How to Be Deadly	Glenn	
2016	Away from Everywhere	Clyde	
2016	Maudie	Mr. Hill	

=== TV ===
Television
Year	Title	Role	Notes
1975	Peep Show	Various roles	(TV Series), 1 episode: "Festering Forefathers and Running Sons"
1974	Cod on a Stick	Various roles	(TV Movie)
1978	The Root Seller	Various roles	(TV Series), 6 episodes
1980-1983	The Wonderful Grand Band	Various roles	(TV Series),
1983	Two Foolish to Talk About	Various roles	(TV Movie)
1985	The S and M Comic Book	Various roles	(TV Movie)
1986	The Adventure of Faustus Bidgood	Vasily Bogdanovitch Shagoff	(TV Movie)
1988-1993	Codco	Various roles	(TV Series), 35 episodes
1992	The National Doubt	Various roles	(TV Movie)
1998	Emily of New Moon	Mad Man Morrison	(TV Series), 1 episode: "The Curse of the Poppett"
2001	Messiah from Montreal	A.M.Klein (Minuet)	(TV Movie)
2006	Heyday!	Richard Maynard	(TV Movie)
2009	Diverted	Joe Vernon	(TV Movie)
2010-2014	Republic of Doyle	Finn	(TV Series), 6 episodes
2017	Frontier	Innkeeper	(TV Series), 1 episode: "Mutiny"
2022	Son of a Critch	Fr. Patrick Moore	(TV Series), 1 episode: "Father Critch"

== Politics ==
Malone participated in the campaign that stopped the privatization of Newfoundland and Labrador Hydro, and has championed other environmental causes, including a campaign to ban shipping of garbage to Newfoundland. He ran as a candidate for the New Democratic Party in the St. John's West by-election in 2000, losing narrowly to Loyola Hearn.

Malone supported Elizabeth May and the Green Party of Canada in the 2008 election, and performed at the 2009 Green Party convention in Pictou, Nova Scotia.

In June 2019, Malone was announced as the Green party candidate for the riding of Avalon for the 2019 federal election. Malone finished a distant fourth in the election.

== Electoral record ==
2019 Canadian federal election: Avalon
Party	Candidate	Votes	%	±%	Expenditures
Liberal	Ken McDonald	19,122	46.26	−9.64	$63,518.25
Conservative	Matthew Chapman	12,855	31.10	+20.00	$37,082.47
New Democratic	Lea Mary Movelle	7,142	17.28	+2.85	none listed
Green	Greg Malone	2,215	5.36	+4.82	none listed
Total valid votes/expense limit		41,334	99.05	-0.57	$104,436.05
Total rejected ballots		397	0.95	+0.57	
Turnout		41,731	59.33	−2.36	
Eligible voters		70,341			
Liberal hold		Swing		−14.82	
Source: Elections Canada

St. John's West, Newfoundland by-election, May 15, 2000
Party	Candidate	Votes	%	±%
Progressive Conservative	Loyola Hearn	11,392	35.48	▼8.59
New Democratic	Greg Malone	11,036	34.37	▲18.77
Liberal	Anthony Sparrow	8,032	25.01	▼12.07
Alliance	Frank Hall	1,315	4.09	–
Independent	E. Sailor White	332	1.03	–
Total valid votes		32,107	99.74	
Total rejected ballots		103	0.26	
Total votes		32,210	44.31	
Eligible voters		72,697		
Progressive Conservative hold		Swing		-13.14
