= The Great Eastern (radio show) =

Canadian radio program

- Genre: Comedy
- Running time: ca. 54 min. (1994–1995); ca. 28 min. (1996–1999)
- Country of origin: Canada
- Language: English
- Home station: CBC Radio One
- Hosted by: Paul Moth
- Created by: Mack Furlong; Steven Palmer; Ed Riche
- Written by: Mack Furlong; Steven Palmer; Ed Riche
- Produced by: Glen Tilley
- Recording studio: St. John's, Canada
- Audio format: Monophonic
- Opening theme: Marc Johnson, Samurai Hee-Haw
- Ending theme: The Plankerdown Band, The Jig is Up

The Great Eastern was a radio comedy show on CBC Radio One. It ran from 1994 to 1999.

Billed as "Newfoundland's Cultural Magazine", The Great Eastern was an hour-long summer replacement show on CBC Radio One for the first two seasons, and then became a half-hour regular show for the next three seasons. Purportedly a culture, arts and entertainment show on the Broadcasting Corporation of Newfoundland (BCN), The Great Eastern was in fact a satirical and parodic comedy which developed an extensive fictional universe of characters and Newfoundland institutions.

== Content and Style ==
The Great Eastern purported to be a long-running show on the BCN of which hour-long and half-hour-long segments were broadcast on Radio One (and, through atmospheric anomalies, to Iceland). It was named, both in real life and in fiction, after the ill-fated 19th-century steamship bearing the same name.

Although content varied from episode to episode, most started with theme music, moved to a hearty introduction and hello from host Paul Moth, a visit to BCN director Ish Lundrigan and the BCN vault for "archival" radio content, the "What's that noise from Newfoundland" contest, and then to the meat of the show, which might involve anything from discussions of the religion/get-rich-quick scheme Economology to Newfoundland Christmas radio plays. Interspersed in most episodes were "community announcements" and promotional material for other BCN shows which further established the world of The Great Eastern.

A central conceit of The Great Eastern was that its characters never broke the fourth wall to suggest that the show, despite its outlandish content, was anything other than real. Its creators actively resisted the CBC's attempts to market it to listeners as a comedy. In 1996, co-creator Mack Furlong wrote to the CBC to protest this practice: "Part of whatever charm The Great Eastern possesses is gained in no small way by the fact that we purport that the show is real, that it is actually, Nfld's Cultural Magazine. The straighter CBC plays this line, the funnier the concept is.... Every good joke needs a straight set up."

A number of prominent Canadians appeared on the show as themselves or playing characters, including Andy Jones, Rick Mercer and Margaret Atwood.

== The (Fictional) World of the Great Eastern ==
=== Characters ===
Some recurring characters on The Great Eastern were:

- Paul Moth (played by Mack Furlong), the mostly genial host. He has a shoe fetish, a fear of being probed by aliens, a checkered past replete with substance abuse and a past career involving such things as directing Mexican versions of Lassie movies. These events are probably covered in his book, The Rocky Road to Recovery.
- Erling Biggs (played by Jamie Fitzpatrick), the BCN's erudite "Weather Watchdog" and occasional substitute host for Paul Moth.
- J. Richard Candow, conservative pundit, lobbyist and political opportunist.
- Hollis Duffett, sound engineer for The Great Eastern and custodian of the "Noise from Newfoundland".
- Ariel Flint, liberal pundit and host of BCN's Show Trial.
- Jerome Granger, earnest host of the investigative journalism show Wearing the Wire.
- Kathleen Hanrahan, book reviewer, featured in the segment Wordworks.
- Morris Jesso, mortician host of the popular BCN series Interred.
- Ishmael "Ish" Lundrigan (played by Michael Wade), the BCN's surly director of radio and custodian of the BCN vault. Old Ish is a BCN company man, fighting the union and cutting every corner.
- Rita Molloy (played by Jacinta Wall), host of The Five O'Clock News at 5:30.
- Ari Uldmanis, the BCN's "Latvian" Head of Engineering, strongly implied to be a German ex-Nazi and likely a reference to real-life Newfoundland political figure and reputed Nazi collaborator Alfred Valdmanis.

=== Institutions ===
Institutions and locations in The Great Eastern universe included:

- UNSJ, the hyper-corporate University of Newfoundland at St. John's.
- Oougubomba, a fictional African nation (capital: Beepbobalula) and former colony of Newfoundland, through which Paul Moth made a Heart of Darkness-esque journey over the course of two episodes.
- The Funks, based on the real (uninhabited) Funk Island, allegedly containing the BCN's massive repeater station. Crewing the repeater on the bird-infested Funk Islands was an experience that brought near madness to BCN crew members, including Paul Moth and Erling Biggs, who were sent there.
- Furlong Confections, the makers of Furlong Knobs candy.

=== The BCN ===
The real-world Broadcasting Corporation of Newfoundland ceased transmission in 1949 when it was absorbed into the CBC after Newfoundland joined Confederation. On The Great Eastern, it had somehow endured. The BCN was based in a former abattoir on Duckworth Street in St. John's, proudly broadcasting "coal-fired radio" from its transmitter tower atop Mount Scio.

The Great Eastern was supposedly one show as part of a full week's roster of programming on the BCN. The full show was supposedly two and a half hours long, with Canadian listeners tuning in only to the final half-hour of the show. Promotional material for other shows was frequently heard during The Great Eastern, including:

- Interred, a program devoted to death and dying, supposedly the BCN's most popular show.
- Paul's Pot, a cooking show with various outlandishly-themed dishes.
- Uncle Jack's Shack, a supposedly family-friendly show whose titular character was always engaged in hijinks featuring some form of criminality, sex or violence.
- Nocturnal Emissions, a late-night music program.

== Creators ==
The show was written by Mack Furlong, Steven Palmer, and Ed Riche, and produced by Glen Tilley, although to maintain the illusion of The Great Eastern as being a "real" show this was never mentioned on the show itself except during the closing credits of some seasons, when they were referred to as the BCN's "legal team."

== The Decline of The Great Eastern ==
The Great Eastern developed a fairly large group of fans; however, late in the show's run the CBC attempted to cut the budget and suggest script changes aimed at making the show more accessible. The last episode of The Great Eastern aired in 1999 and, apart from a 2002 one-off celebrating the life of Guglielmo Marconi, the show never returned to the CBC.

The creators' papers have been donated to the archives of the Memorial University of Newfoundland.

== The Great Eastern on the Web ==
Gerry Porter maintains a detailed site on the show—it includes complete episodes in MP3 format amongst other content.
