= Daily Tips for Modern Living =

- Genre: Comedy
- Starring: Greg Thomey
- Country of origin: Canada
- Original language: English
- No. of episodes: 6

Production
- Executive producer: Michael Donovan
- Producer: Marilyn Richardson
- Running time: 30 minutes (time slot)

Original release
- Network: CBC
- Release: 1998 – 1998

Related
- This Hour Has 22 Minutes

Daily Tips for Modern Living is a six-episode comedy television series that aired across Canada in 1998 on CBC Television. Greg Thomey portrayed Ernie Post, a caricature of a lifestyle program host. The show was conceived as a satire of Martha Stewart Living, with up to six sketches per episode.

The half-hour programs were produced by Salter Street Films in mid-1997 at Halifax, Nova Scotia. Writers for the show were Mark Farrell, Christian Murray, Tim Steeves and Greg Thomey. Matt Gallagher was the series director.
