= Gullage's =

Canadian television comedy-drama series

- Genre: Comedy-drama
- Created by: William D. MacGillivray
- Starring: Bryan Hennessey; Michael Wade
- Country of origin: Canada
- No. of seasons: 2
- No. of episodes: 18

Production
- Running time: 30 minutes

Original release
- Network: CBC Television
- Release: October 2, 1996 – December 1997

Gullage's is a Canadian comedy drama television series that aired on CBC Television from October 2, 1996 to November 10, 1997. The show starred Bryan Hennessey as Calvin Pope, a cab driver for Gullage's Taxi in St. John's, Newfoundland and Labrador.

The cast also included Brenda Devine, Brian Best, Elizabeth Pickard, Frank Barry, Janis Spence, Jody Richardson, Koady Whelan, Mercedes Barry, Michael Wade and Philip Dinn.

The show aired six episodes in its first season, and was renewed for a 13-episode second season that aired in 1997. It concluded its run in December 1997, and was not renewed for a third season.
