= Tommy Sexton =

Canadian comedian (1957–1993)

- Born: Thomas Sexton; July 3, 1957; St. John's, Newfoundland, Canada
- Died: December 13, 1993 (aged 36); St. John's, Newfoundland, Canada

Thomas Sexton (July 3, 1957 – December 13, 1993) was a Canadian comedian. Born in St. John's, Newfoundland, he was the youngest member of the CODCO comedy troupe.

== Early life and career ==
Educated in St. John's, he was an honours student before quitting after Grade 10 to pursue an acting career in Toronto. After briefly working on a children's touring theatre show, he landed his first television role in the drama series Police Surgeon. Sexton and colleague Diane Olsen subsequently wrote Cod on a Stick, a comedic play which launched CODCO.

In 1975, Sexton took a brief sabbatical from CODCO to study at the Toronto Dance Theatre. He subsequently returned, working on other shows with CODCO and subsequently touring with colleague Greg Malone in two co-written works, The Wonderful Grand Band and Two Foolish to Talk About. In 1985 and 1986, Sexton and Malone wrote and performed in a series of television specials for the CBC, called The S and M Comic Book, which in turn led to CODCO landing its own series in 1988.

== Later career and death ==
After CODCO's run concluded in 1993, Sexton and Malone wrote and starred in a CBC television special, The National Doubt, satirizing the constitutional debates of the early 1990s. Sexton subsequently wrote a semi-autobiographical film, Adult Children of Alcoholics: The Musical, which was in production in November 1993 when Sexton, who was openly gay, fell ill due to complications from AIDS. He died on December 13 of that year.

== Legacy ==
Greg Malone subsequently campaigned for HIV and AIDS education in Sexton's memory. Tommy's sister, filmmaker Mary Sexton, produced a documentary film about him, Tommy…A Family Portrait, in 2001. Along with Malone and their CODCO co-star Andy Jones, Sexton was a posthumous recipient of the Earle Grey Award, the lifetime achievement award of Canadian television's Gemini Awards, in 2002.

The Tommy Sexton Centre, a new assisted housing complex for people living with HIV and AIDS, was opened in St. John's in 2006. In 2009, several drag queens in the city put together "Ravishing in Red", a tribute show to Sexton, as a fundraiser for the Sexton Centre. One performer, Betty "Boo" Kakke, singled him out as Newfoundland's "clown prince".

Sexton's mother, Sara Sexton, became a major figure in HIV/AIDS awareness in Newfoundland and Labrador following her son's death. Sara Sexton was announced as an inductee to the Order of Newfoundland and Labrador in 2013, and was inducted in February 2014. Sara Sexton died on February 28, 2020; in 2021, Mary Sexton and her son Nik Sexton released Me, Mom & COVID, a documentary film about Sara's life and death of COVID-19.
