= Thomas Trio and the Red Albino =

Canadian funk rock band

- Origin: St. John's, Newfoundland, Canada
- Genres: funk rock pop rock
- Labels: Cargo Records
- Past members: Jody Richardson; Louis Thomas; David "Lil" Thomas; Danny Thomas; Linda Kronbergs; Lori Cooper

Thomas Trio and the Red Albino were a Canadian funk rock band from St. John's, Newfoundland, who were active from 1988 to 1993. They are best known for their singles "142 Thru" and "Sun Risin'".

The band formed in 1988 as Thomas Trio, consisting of brothers Louis, David ("Lil") and Danny Thomas. Jody Richardson, nicknamed "The Red Albino" because of the juxtaposition between his red hair and pale skin, joined as vocalist soon after, adding his nickname to the band's name since they were no longer just a trio. Keyboardist Lori Cooper, Danny's wife, was also later added to the lineup with no further name change.

They released their debut album Jam It Inya independently in 1989, and in 1990 they competed in and won a national "battle of the bands" competition sponsored by Molson Canadian; this, in turn, enabled them to represent Canada at the international Yamaha Band Explosion competition in Japan in 1991. Although they did not win that competition, favourable reaction resulted in them quickly building a reputation as a strong live band.

They then moved to Toronto to be closer to the centre of the Canadian music industry, although Cooper left the band at this time because she had just given birth to her first child and did not want to tour extensively, and was replaced on keyboards by Linda Kronbergs. In the same year they released a video for the single "142 Thru", and won a CASBY Award for Favourite New Eastern Canadian Group. "142 Thru" became the first independent video in the history of MuchMusic to be graduated from light to medium rotation.

Their self-titled album was released on Cargo Records in 1992, garnering radio airplay for the single "Sun Risin'" and an appearance on Friday Night with Ralph Benmergui in early 1993. By this time the band had such a strong reputation for its live show that Louis Thomas began extending a money back guarantee to any dissatisfied audience members.

The band announced its breakup in summer 1993, before releasing another album, due to creative stagnation. They played a final show in Waterloo, Ontario on September 30 of that year, and later performed a one-off reunion show for a benefit concert in St. John's in 1997.

Richardson went on to form the bands Fur Packed Action and Pathological Lovers, and took some acting roles including in the CBC Television sitcom Gullage's and the films Violet and The Divine Ryans. Louis Thomas went on to become manager of Great Big Sea, Danny Thomas became a technician for bands including Great Big Sea, and Lil Thomas became a recording engineer in Danny Greenspoon's studio.
