= Robert Joy =

Canadian actor (born 1951)

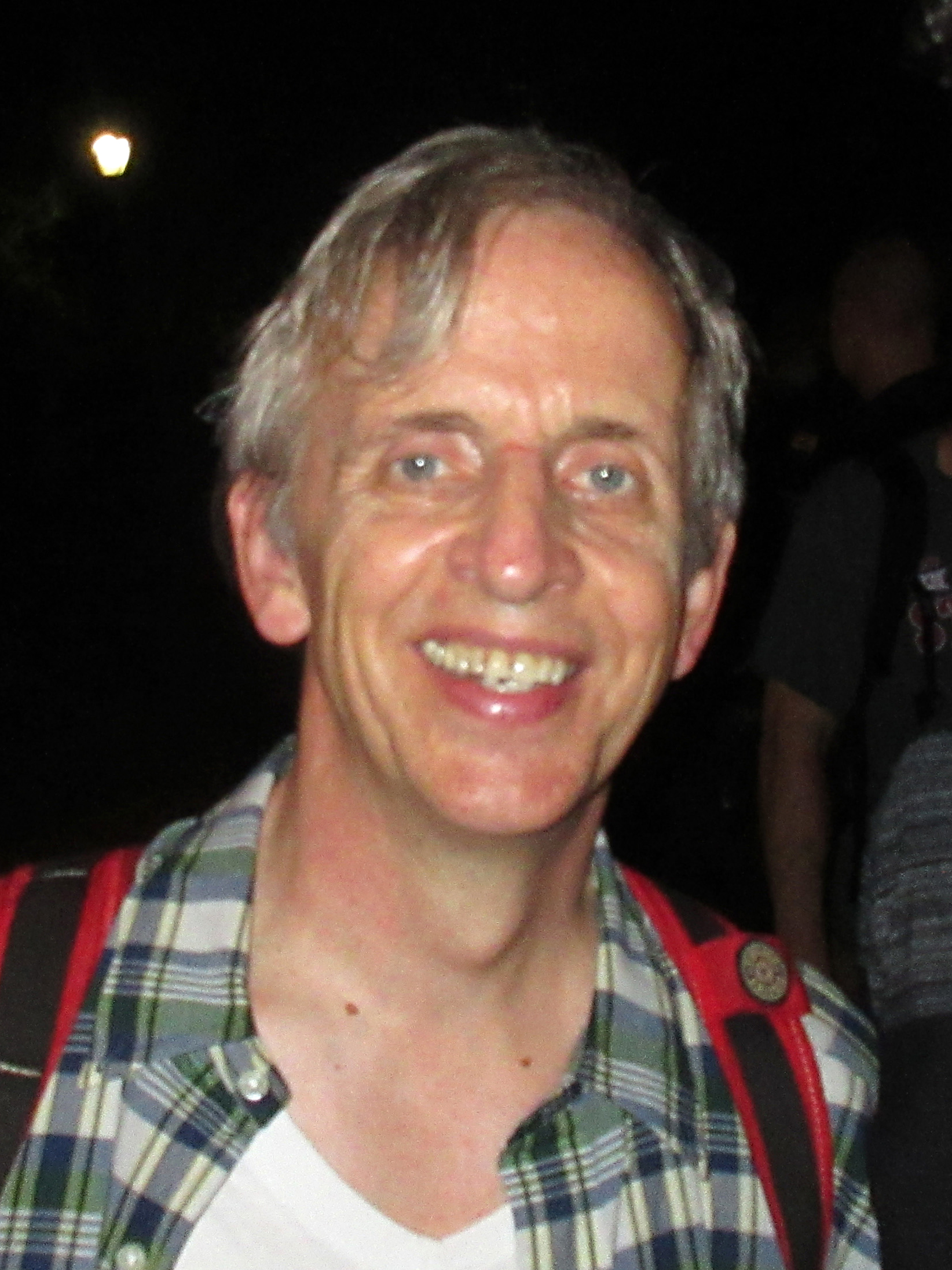
- Joy in 2017
- Born: August 17, 1951 (age 75); Montreal, Quebec, Canada
- Education: Corpus Christi College, Oxford; Memorial University of Newfoundland
- Occupation: Actor
- Years active: 1974–present
- Spouse: Mary Joy (m. 1979, divorced)
- Partners: William Duff-Griffin (d. 1994); Henry Krieger (1995–present)
- Children: 1

Robert Joy (born August 17, 1951) is a Canadian actor. He is best known for his role as medical examiner Sid Hammerback on the police procedural series CSI: NY, and his appearances in the films Atlantic City (1980), Ragtime (1981), Desperately Seeking Susan (1985), WaterWorld (1995), Land of the Dead (2005), The Hills Have Eyes (2006), and Aliens vs. Predator: Requiem (2007). He is a two-time Genie Award nominee for Best Supporting Actor; for Atlantic City and Whole New Thing.

Joy has also worked extensively on the stage, particularly in Shakespearean productions, in both Canada and the United States. Earlier in his career, he was closely affiliated with Newfoundland comedy troupe CODCO.

== Early life ==
Joy was born on August 17, 1951, in Montreal, Quebec, Canada and grew up in St. John's, Newfoundland. He is the son of Flora Louise (née Pike) and Dr. Clifton Joseph Joy, a physician and politician. He attended Corpus Christi College, Oxford, on a Rhodes Scholarship and Memorial University of Newfoundland.

== Career ==
Joy played Madonna's punk musician boyfriend Jim in 1985's Desperately Seeking Susan, and the Dutch-Israeli Hans in the 1986 Alliance/CTV production Sword of Gideon, an adaptation of George Jonas's book Vengeance.

In 1998, he appeared in Gregory Hoblit's thriller Fallen, where he fit into the all-star cast that included Denzel Washington, Donald Sutherland, James Gandolfini, and John Goodman. In 2005, he had a lead role as the simple-minded sharpshooter Charlie Houx in George A. Romero's zombie film Land of the Dead.

In the fall of 2005, Joy joined the CBS police procedural series CSI: NY during its second season as a recurring character, Dr. Sid Hammerback, the Chief Medical Examiner, and became a main cast member in season five. Joy stated, "I basically read the script and then look up everything on Wikipedia that I don't know, and try to find out how to pronounce all the long words and get my head around actually what it is that I'm conveying, because often my character has a lot of explaining to do."

In 2006, Joy appeared onscreen in Alexandre Aja's remake of The Hills Have Eyes where he portrays a mutant named Lizard. He also starred as Ted Bedworth, father of Samaire Armstrong's character Nell Bedworth, in the 2006 romantic comedy It's a Boy Girl Thing. In 2007, Joy played the character of Colonel Stevens in Aliens vs. Predator: Requiem. He appeared as Dr. Stephen Hawking in the comedy Superhero Movie in 2008.

In addition to his acting, Joy was frequently associated with the Newfoundland-based CODCO, working with the comedy troupe on many of their pre-television stage shows and appearing as a guest performer in the series. He also co-starred in the 1986 Andy Jones film, The Adventure of Faustus Bidgood, the only film that features the entire cast of CODCO.

He appeared as himself in the 2012 documentary film That Guy... Who Was in That Thing.

Joy has had on-going stage engagements on Broadway and throughout US, most recently appearing as Charles in King Charles III at Shakespeare Theatre Company in Washington, DC (February 7 – March 18, 2017). and as Crito and the poet Mellitus in "Socrates" at The Public Theater, New York, NY, which ran from April 2019 through June 3, 2019.

== Personal life ==
Joy is divorced from actress Mary Joy. They have one daughter, Ruby Joy, who is an actress. In the summer of 2011, Joy and his daughter performed together in Shakespeare's The Tempest. Joy was formerly the partner of actor William Duff-Griffin, who died from prostate cancer on November 13, 1994. Joy has been in a relationship with Broadway composer Henry Krieger since 1995.

== Filmography ==
=== Film ===
Year	Title	Role	Notes
1980	Atlantic City	Dave Matthews	Nominated – Genie Award for Best Performance by an Actor in a Supporting Role
1981	Ticket to Heaven	Patrick	
1981	Threshold	David Art	
1981	Ragtime	Henry "Harry" Kendall Thaw	
1983	Amityville 3-D	Elliot West	
1985	Desperately Seeking Susan	Jim	
1985	Terminal Choice	Dr. Harvey Rimmer	
1985	Joshua Then and Now	Colin Fraser	
1986	The Adventure of Faustus Bidgood	Eddie Peddle	Also composer
1987	Radio Days	Fred	
1987	Big Shots	Dickie	
1988	The Suicide Club	Michael Collins	
1989	She's Back	Paul	
1989	Millennium	Sherman the Robot	
1989	Longtime Companion	Ron	
1991	Shadows and Fog	Spiro's Assistant	
1993	The Dark Half	Fred Clawson	
1994	Death Wish V: The Face of Death	Freddie Flakes	
1995	Waterworld	Ledger Guy	
1995	A Modern Affair	Sperm Bank technician	
1996	Harriet the Spy	Ben Welsch	
1997	Henry & Verlin	Ferris	
1998	Fallen	Charles Olom	
1999	Resurrection	Gerald Demus	
2000	Bonhoeffer: Agent of Grace	Manfred Roeder	
2001	Perfume	Andrew	
2001	Sweet November	Raeford Dunne	
2001	Joe Somebody	Pat Chilcutt	
2001	The Shipping News	EMS Officer	
2005	Land of the Dead	Charlie	
2005	Whole New Thing	Rog	
2006	The Hills Have Eyes	Lizard	
2006	Dinner for One	Man	
2006	It's a Boy Girl Thing	Ted Bedworth	
2007	Aliens vs. Predator: Requiem	Col. Stevens	
2008	Superhero Movie	Professor Stephen Hawking	
2008	Down to the Dirt	Robert Kavanagh	
2013	Impromptu	Chuck	Voice role
2018	Crown and Anchor	Doug	
2019	The Goldfinch	Welton "Welty" Blackwell	
2021	Don't Look Up	Congressman Tenant	

=== Television ===
Year	Title	Role	Notes
1974	The National Dream: Building the Impossible Railway	Carter	TV miniseries
1981	Escape from Iran: The Canadian Caper	Mark Lijek	TV movie
1985–1989	The Equalizer	Jacob Stock	5 episodes "The Defector" (S1.E3) "Prelude" (S2.E1) "17 Zebra" (S4.E14) "Heart of Justice" (S4.E19) "Race Traitors" (S4.E20)
1985	Moonlighting	Clark Greydon	1 episode: "My Fair David"
1986	Miracle at Moreaux	Major Braun	TV movie
1986	Sword of Gideon	Hans	TV movie
1987	The Lawrenceville Stories	Mr. Tapping	TV miniseries
1989	Miami Vice	Sebastian Ross	1 episode: "Miami Squeeze"
1990	Judgment	Mr. Hummel	TV movie
1991	Grand Larceny	Henry Piggott	TV movie
1991	The Days and Nights of Molly Dodd	Christopher DeWitt	1 episode: "Here's How to Break the Other Leg"
1991	Hyde in Hollywood	Julian Hyde	TV movie
1991	Scales of Justice	Robert Stewart	Episode "Regina v Stewart"
1992	The Ray Bradbury Theater	Booth	1 episode: "Downwind from Gettysburg"
1993	Dieppe	Hughes-Hallett	TV movie
1993	Gregory K	Ralph Kingsley	TV movie
1993	Maniac Mansion	Pony	1 episode: "Love Letters"
1993	Woman on Trial: The Lawrencia Bembenek Story	Sheldon Zenner	TV movie
1993	Tracey Ullman Takes on New York	Disgruntled Ex-Employee	TV movie
1995	Law & Order	Leo Barnett	1 episode: "Pride"
1995	New York Undercover	Glenn Holloway	1 episode: "Tag, You're Dead"
1995	The Marshal	Thomas Borden	1 episode: "Pass the Gemelli"
1995	Side Effects	Connor Dennison	1 episode: "Paying the Price"
1996	Wings	Dr. Grayson	1 episode: "One Flew Over the Cooper's Nest"
1996	The Nerd	Rick Steadman	TV pilot
1996	Dangerous Offender: The Marlene Moore Story	Dr. Steve Gibson	TV movie
1996	Moonlight Becomes You	Earl Bateman	TV movie
1998	Law & Order	Louis Dutton	1 episode: "Stalker"
1998	The Outer Limits	Dr. Greg Olander	1 episode: "Identity Crisis"
1999	Becker	Tetzoff	1 episode: "P.C. World"
1999	Seasons of Love	Jim Brewster	TV movie
1999	Snoops	Walter Byrd	1 episode: "Singer in the Band"
1999	Two Guys, a Girl and a Pizza Place	Ed	1 episode: "Halloween 2: Mind Over Body"
2000	Nash Bridges	Norman Craft	1 episode: "Heist"
2000	Relic Hunter	Dr. Flaubert	1 episode: "Dagger of Death"
2001	Haven	Lawrence Dickson	TV movie
2001	Star Trek: Voyager	Inspector Yerid	1 episode: "Workforce: Part 2"
2001	61*	Bob Fitschel	TV movie
2001	Titus	Father Crawford	1 episode: "The Wedding"
2001	Gideon's Crossing	Andy Alter	1 episode: "Is There a Wise Man in the House?"
2001	Just Ask My Children	Sam Bennis	TV movie
2001	The Guardian	Larry Hines	1 episode: "Loyalties"
2002	Crossing Jordan	Ethan Grady	1 episode: "Blood Relatives"
2002	MDs	Frank Coones	All 10 episodes
2003	The Agency	Mr. Thornby	1 episode: "Absolute Bastard"
2003	Without a Trace	Josh's Father	1 episode: "Victory for Humanity"
2003	Alias	Dr. Hans Jürgens	1 episode: "Second Double"
2004	Malcolm in the Middle	Danny	1 episode: "Hot Tub"
2004	Helter Skelter	Detective Morrisy	TV movie
2004	Sex Traffic	Major James Brooke	TV movie
2004	Everybody Loves Raymond	Mr. Putnam	1 episode: "Ally's F"
2004–2005	Boston Legal	A.D.A. Preston	2 episodes: "Change of Course" and "Tortured Souls"
2005	Medium	Dr. Kenneth Holloway	1 episode: "Penny for Your Thoughts"
2005	E-Ring	Mark Boskovich	1 episode: "Pilot"
2005–2013	CSI: NY	Dr. Sid Hammerback	168 episodes; main character
2006	Commander in Chief	Frank Devane	1 episode: "State of the Unions"
2010, 2013	Republic of Doyle	Al Kavanagh	3 episodes
2014	Grey's Anatomy	Marty	1 episode: "I'm Winning"
2014	The Mentalist	Alexander Lark	1 episode: "Black Hearts"
2014	The Good Wife	Wendell Keller	1 episode: "Dear God"
2015	Defiance	Monguno's Father	2 episodes
2015	Hand of God	Ira Goldstein	2 episodes
2021	Prodigal Son	Gerald Morris	1 episode: "Exit Strategy"
2022	Julia	Hunter Fox	Recurring role; 7 episodes
2024	From	Henry Kavanaugh	Main character
2025	The Institute	Dr. Daniel Hendricks	Main character
