= Fat Land =

Book by Greg Critser

Fat Land: How Americans Became the Fattest People in the World
- Author: Greg Critser
- Language: English
- Subject: Obesity, diet
- Genre: Non-fiction
- Publisher: Houghton Mifflin Company
- Publication date: 2003
- Publication place: United States
- Pages: 232
- ISBN: 0618380604

Fat Land: How Americans Became the Fattest People in the World is a 2003 non-fiction book by Greg Critser describing how 60% of Americans came to be overweight and exploring the relationship between the relentless rise of fast food corporations and increasing sizes in the American diet, along with misguided government policies and poor nutritional education in schools. Critser also describes specific health risks linked to obesity and a fast food-rich diet. The book covers some of the same subject matter as Eric Schlosser's Fast Food Nation (2001), but expands on the health costs of obesity to children and adults.
