= Heather Mallick =

Canadian columnist, author and lecturer (born 1959)

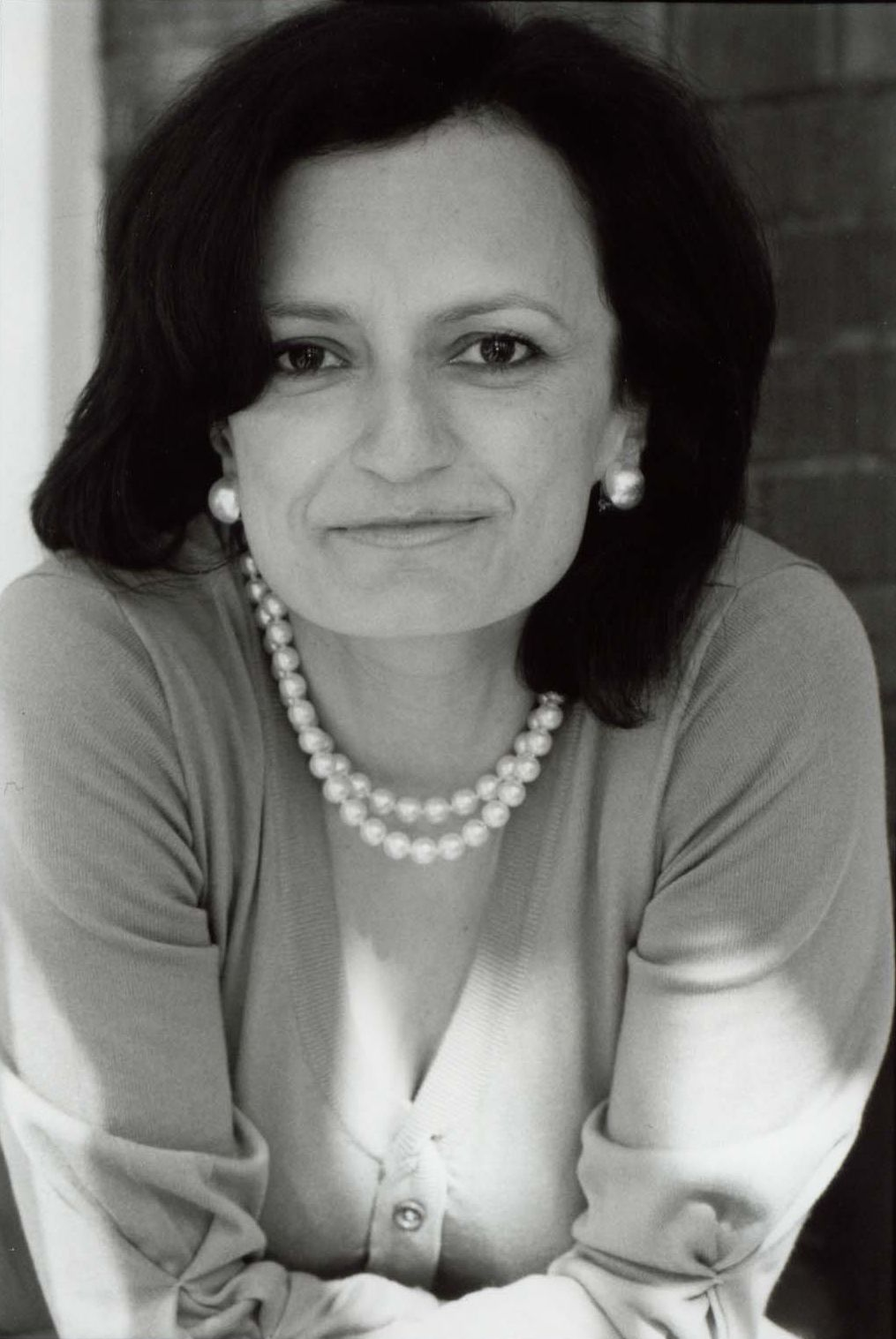
- Born: 1959 (age 66–67); Norway House, Manitoba, Canada
- Education: Ryerson University
- Occupation: Journalist

Heather Mallick (born 1959) is a Canadian columnist, author and lecturer. She has been a staff columnist for the Toronto Star since 2010, writing a news column on Saturday and on the opinion page on Monday and Wednesday. She writes about feminism, news and politics. She has previously written for the Toronto Sun, The Globe and Mail, and the Financial Post.

== Early life and education ==
Mallick was born in Norway House, Manitoba, to an Indian Bengali father from Kolkata and a Scottish mother. She was raised in the Northern Ontario town of Kapuskasing, and in other remote communities where her father worked as a physician. During her childhood, she very much enjoyed reading. At the age of nine she had finished Cancer Ward by Aleksandr Solzhenitsyn and when she turned 11 she read Lucy Crown by Irwin Shaw. Mallick attended the University of Toronto where she received a bachelor's and Master of Arts degrees in English Literature. She also earned a bachelor's degree in Journalism from Ryerson University after attending Seymour Hersh's lecture about Vietnam War's My Lai Massacre and studying there for two years. While studying, she worked for the local student newspaper, The Ryersonian and during her late university years worked as a summer intern in coveted reporting for The Globe and Mail. Mallick is an atheist.

== Career ==
After graduation, she got another summer internship at the Toronto Star, while maintaining a freelance reporter position at The Globe. In 1988, she was employed at the Canadian financial daily newspaper Financial Post where she first worked as a copy editor and later became a news editor. She left Financial Post in 1991, after marrying Stephen Petherbridge, a senior British/Canadian journalist.

She first came to public notice in Canada during the 1990s as the book review editor and writer for the Sunday edition of the Toronto Sun, where she won two Canadian Newspaper Association National Newspaper Awards for critical writing in 1994 and feature writing in 1996. Mallick had quit the Sun in 1999 with a quote "I could not bear the thought of turning 40 and working there."

Mallick later wrote for The Globe and Mail where her left-of-centre political opinion column "As If" was a regular part of the paper's Saturday edition until December 2005. She also wrote major and minor pieces for the newspaper on lifestyle and other issues as well as Chatelaine magazine. She joined the Toronto Star in August 2010.

Mallick's first book, Pearls in Vinegar, was published in September 2004, in Canada. She published a collection of new essays for Knopf Canada in April 2007, entitled Cake or Death: The Excruciating Choices of Everyday Life.

In October 2007, Mallick gave the second annual Mel Hurtig Lecture on the Future of Canada, at the University of Alberta.

== Themes ==
Shortly after joining The Toronto Star in 2010, Mallick wrote an article describing her "painful sordid history" with Fox News, "with rancour on their side and disgust on mine."

In 2010, Montréal, Québec-based Quebecor Media Inc., owned by Pierre Karl Péladeau (PKP), who is also president and CEO of Quebecor Inc., and Sun Media Corporation, was applying to the CRTC, then under the direction of Konrad von Finckenstein, for a "special CRTC-granted status" that would give Sun TV News a "'mandatory" cable deal'". Mallick reported that, according to Péladeau, without this concession, the channel would "collapse". This much sought-after special status would mean the mandatory inclusion of Sun TV News in "one tier, or cable package[s]".

In 2008, after Sarah Palin was selected as the U.S. Republican party's Vice-Presidential candidate, Mallick, among other things, labelled Palin as "white trash" and an "Alaskan hillbilly" and likened her to a "toned-down ... porn actress" in a column for the CBC. The column aroused fierce criticism. Jonathan Kay, writing in the National Post, accused Mallick of "childish vulgarity" and "hypocrisy" and said that her writing "is haunted by hateful hang-ups about Americans, country-dwellers and the political right. Some of her obsessions are downright weird — such as her prurient insistence that male conservatives embrace bad policy because they are impotent and horny." An investigation by the CBC ombudsman found that "many of her most savage assertions lack a basis in fact", and that her aspersions on the sexual inadequacy of Republican men "would easily be seen as, at best, puerile" if "applied to any other group". The publisher of CBC news, John Cruickshank, apologized for publishing Mallick's column, which he called "viciously personal, grossly hyperbolic and intensely partisan".

The July 22, 2011 Norway attacks, in which dozens of people, including participants of a youth camp in Norway, were perpetrated by Anders Behring Breivik, who was later convicted of mass murder and terrorism. According to a July 26, 2011 article in The Guardian, about 90 minutes before his attacks, Breivik emailed his 1,518 page manifesto, called "A European Declaration of Independence" to 1,003 email addresses with the greeting "Western Europe patriot". In her July 28, 2011, article, in The Toronto Sun, entitled "What to do when a monster likes your work", Mallick described the recipients of the emails as a "small but select crowd of people in Canada, the U.S. and Europe", as "agitators who woke up last Saturday to find that the Norwegian monster Anders Breivik liked them."

A British journalist mentioned in the column, Melanie Phillips, promptly commenced legal action. The Star printed an apology, stating in part, "The column made reference to Ms. Phillips' writings in an entirely misleading and inappropriate manner." The paper also removed the column from their website, and settled with Phillips for full legal costs, plus a donation to a charity of her choice in lieu of damages.

== Works ==
- Pearls in Vinegar: The Pillow Book of Heather Mallick (2004) ISBN 978-0-670-04462-7. This is a collection of her short essays on many different subjects, personal, social and political, as a modern version of the 10th Century Japanese Pillow Book by Sei Shōnagon.
- Cake or Death: The Excruciating Choices of Everyday Life (2007) ISBN 978-0-676-97840-7.

== See also ==
- List of newspaper columnists
