= Greg Critser =

American science writer (1954–2018)

Greg Critser (July 18, 1954, in Steubenville, Ohio – January 13, 2018) was an American writer on medicine, science, food and health. His work has appeared in periodicals ranging from the New York Times to the Times of London, and from Harper's to the New Yorker. He is the author of the best seller Fat Land: How Americans Became the Fattest People in the World (Houghton Mifflin 2003), and the award-winning Generation Rx: How Prescription Drugs are Altering American Minds, Lives and Bodies (Houghton 2005). His most recent book, Eternity Soup: Inside the Quest to End Aging, was published by Random House in January 2010. He lectured widely at universities and medical schools, and his blog could be found at Scientificblogging.com.

== Books ==
In 2003, Houghton Mifflin published Fat Land: How Americans Became the Fattest People in the World (ISBN 0-618-38060-4).

In 2006, Houghton Mifflin published Generation Rx: How prescription drugs are altering American lives, minds, and bodies (ISBN 0-618-39313-7) about the pharmaceutical industry and its interaction with the American public.

In January 2010, Random House published Eternity Soup: Inside the Quest to End Aging.
