= The Adventure of Faustus Bidgood =

1986 film by Andy Jones and Mike Jones

- Directed by: Andy Jones; Michael Jones
- Written by: Andy Jones; Michael Jones
- Produced by: Andy Jones; Michael Jones
- Starring: Andy Jones; Greg Malone
- Cinematography: Michael Jones
- Edited by: Michael Jones
- Music by: Robert Joy; Pamela Morgan; Paul Steffler
- Release date: 1986
- Running time: 110 minutes
- Country: Canada
- Language: English

The Adventure of Faustus Bidgood is a 1986 surreal Canadian comedy film directed by Andy Jones and written by Andy and Mike Jones, with the collaboration of a number of workshop participants. It stars Andy Jones and Greg Malone.

== Plot ==
Andy Jones stars as Faustus Bidgood, a clerk in the Newfoundland provincial department of education who harbours secret dreams of becoming president of Newfoundland and leading the province to secede from Canada. The film contains several levels of what might be termed competing "realities", oscillating between visions of mundane office work and sequences in which Bidgood accidentally leads a revolution, and containing a film within a film that narrates Faustus' real life and imaginary rise to power.

In the film within a film, we learn that Faustus' paternal grandfather has predicted that a great man will lead the people of Newfoundland to glory. His name is the Reverend Dempster Peebles, although his son (Faustus' father) is named Bruce Bidgood and Faustus full name is Faustus Peebles Bidgood.

== Cast ==
The film also stars Jones' CODCO colleagues Robert Joy and Brian Downey, respectively, as Bidgood's boss and a government official who plans to indoctrinate students in a cultish geometric theory known as Total Education. Greg Malone appears as a figment of Faustus' imagination, who acts as both his conscience and as a revolutionary spokesman in Faustus' dream of taking over Newfoundland.

== Production ==
Faustus Bidgood, the first feature film ever produced entirely in Newfoundland with a Newfoundland cast, crew, and funding, was initiated in 1977 and took ten years to complete. It satirizes and comments on aspects of Newfoundland politics and culture, and sends up traditional religious and historical expectations that great men are the prime movers of cultural and social change.

== Awards and nominations ==
8th Genie Awards (1987) - (nominations)
- Best Original Screenplay, Michael Jones and Andy Jones
- Best Achievement in Editing, Michael Jones
- Best Original Song, Robert Joy and Andy Jones, "Show Goin' On"
