= Rare Birds (film) =

2001 film by Sturla Gunnarsson

- Theatrical release poster
- Directed by: Sturla Gunnarsson
- Written by: Edward Riche
- Produced by: Paul Pope; Janet York
- Starring: William Hurt; Molly Parker
- Cinematography: Jan Kiesser
- Edited by: Jeff Warren
- Music by: Jonathan Goldsmith
- Distributed by: Lions Gate Entertainment; Nexo; Shadow Distribution; Studio Home Entertainment
- Release date: September 9, 2001 (Toronto International Film Festival)
- Running time: 99 minutes
- Country: Canada
- Language: English
- Budget: $5,000,000 (estimate)

Rare Birds is a 2001 Canadian comedy-drama film, directed by Sturla Gunnarsson and written by Edward Riche based on his novel.

== Plot ==
Dave (William Hurt) has had some bad luck recently. His wife Claire (Sheila McCarthy) has left him and lives in Washington, DC, while his restaurant, the Auk is not doing good business. Phonse (Andy Jones) helps Dave by making up a story about a rare Tasker's sulphureous duck sighting, which begins to help Dave's business. Phonse has been working on a prototype Recreational Submarine Vehicle (RSV) and is concerned that the Winnebago company is conducting industrial espionage and trying to steal his plans. Phonse also finds ten kilos of cocaine and tries to get rid of it with the help of Dave. Dave falls in love with Alice (Molly Parker), Phonse's sister-in-law, a girl from Gull Tickle. Phonse blows up his RSV. Claire asks Dave for a divorce. Alice goes off to college. Dave finds someone to manage the restaurant and he is seen chasing Alice's taxi.

== Production ==
The film was shot in Cape Spear, Newfoundland and Labrador. It was noted as an unusual Western Canadian/Atlantic Canadian coproduction; the producers were the St. John's-based Paul Pope and the Vancouver-based Janet York, and Gunnarsson is a Vancouver-based director.

The soundtrack features music by The Pogues, Ashley MacIsaac, Émile Benoît and Della Reese, alongside an orchestral score by Jonathan Goldsmith.

== Release ==
The film premiered at the 2001 Toronto International Film Festival. It had its second screening at the Atlantic Film Festival in Halifax, although the producers had to drive the print from Toronto to Halifax due to the flight restrictions in place following the September 11 attacks.

It went into commercial release in 2002.

== Reaction ==
=== Critical response ===
Glen Schaefer of The Province reviewed the film positively, writing that "It's nice to see Parker, Canada's reigning onscreen queen of gloomy sexual dysfunction (Kissed, The Centre of the World), display the lighter side she hasn't used since TV's Twitch City. Hurt, struggling a bit with the Newfoundland accent, still manages to turn in one of his most accessible recent performances. And the scheme to save the restaurant is deceit of a uniquely Canadian, low-key variety. Is there a hugely popular bird-lovers program on Newfoundland radio? There should be. Gunnarsson (the novel-to-movie Such a Long Journey, and the based-on-fact B.C. murder story Scorn) shows a deft, subtle hand in his first go at comedy, letting the prats fall without forcing them."

Marke Andrews of the Vancouver Sun was more mixed, calling the film uneven but praising Jones's performance as Phonse and Riche's ear for dialogue with "an almost musical quality".

Jeet Heer of the National Post was similarly ambivalent, writing that "Rare Birds has enough problems to sink three movies. The plot is a little too cute in its contrived wackiness, while the dialogue is merely serviceable. Sturla Gunnarsson's directing is pedestrian, and too often he has the movie shift uneasily from pure slapstick to seriousness. It is only the acting that redeems Rare Birds from being a flop and turns it into passable entertainment. Hurt does a nice turn as a gone-to-seed charmer whose sheepishly guilty smile still wins over women. As Phonse, Jones makes us share his con man's pleasure in fooling the rubes. Best of all is Parker, whose moxie and sexiness light up the screen. In fact, Parker is so good you keep hoping she'll walk out and go to a better movie." He concluded that "the Newfie joke is, of course, a familiar part of Canadian culture, but less often noticed is the Newfie yarn. While the Newfie joke makes fun of the supposedly low intelligence of islanders, the Newfie yarn is typically about how shrewd Newfoundlanders exploit their reputation for dumbness to trick gullible mainlanders. At its best, Rare Birds feels like a true Newfie yarn, even though it occasionally lapses into being a mediocre Newfie joke."

When film critic Barry Hertz created a list of the 23 best Canadian films ever made for The Globe and Mail in 2023, although Rare Birds was not one of his own selections it was singled out in a sidebar as a favourite of comedian Rick Mercer.

=== Awards ===
Award	Date of ceremony	Category	Recipient(s)	Result	Ref(s)
Atlantic Film Festival	2001	People's Choice Award	Rare Birds	Won	
Genie Awards	February 13, 2003	Best Motion Picture	Paul Pope, Janet York	Nominated	
Genie Awards	February 13, 2003	Best Director	Sturla Gunnarsson	Nominated	
Genie Awards	February 13, 2003	Best Adapted Screenplay	Edward Riche	Nominated	
Genie Awards	February 13, 2003	Best Cinematography	Jan Kiesser	Nominated	
Genie Awards	February 13, 2003	Best Sound Editing	David Evans, Harvey Hyslop, Donna Powell, Paul Steffler	Nominated	
