= Edward Riche =

Canadian writer (born 1961)

- Born: Edward Riche; October 24, 1961 (age 64); Botwood, Newfoundland and Labrador, Canada
- Education: Concordia University, Memorial University
- Occupation: Writer
- Writing career
- Language: English

Edward Riche (born October 24, 1961) is a Canadian writer. He lives in St. John's, Newfoundland and Labrador.

== Background ==
Riche was born in Botwood, Newfoundland. For three years he attended Memorial University, and then transferred to Concordia University, Montreal to study film. He graduated in 1984 with a Bachelor of Fine Art in Film production. Riche then returned to St. John's, Newfoundland and worked producing industrial and training films. Finally, he settled down to write for radio television, film, plays and other literature.

== Achievements and works ==
Riche had occasionally performed for the radio, which sparked an interest in co-creating and writing for The Great Eastern. Which received the CBC Vice-President's Award and a Writers Guild of Canada Award. For his other radio works, The Book I Never Wrote, and, A Plane With One Wing, he received the National Radio Award in 1989 and the Atlantic Journalism Award in 1990. He was also a finalist for the 2007 Writers Guild Awards for his piece called, Early Newfoundland Errors. Riche has also written two screenplays for the Canadian television series Life with Derek and The Boys of St. Vincent. Riche also contributes to documentary projects for CTV and the National Film Board of Canada.

Riche also wrote plays, movies, and television series. In 1997, he had his first novel Rare Birds published, His second book, The Nine Planets, was published in 2004 and won the 2005 Thomas Head Raddall Award. He wrote the screenplay adaptation of his novel Rare Birds. The 2001 movie version of the same name starred William Hurt and Molly Parker. Riche has also written scripts for the television comedies Made in Canada (for which he won two Canadian Screenwriters Awards) and Dooley Gardens.

== Inspiration ==
Edward Riche got the inspiration for his novel, The Nine Planets, and

"happened to be reading a book (I cannot remember the title) that discussed, among many things, the relationship of Kepler and Tycho Brahe. Nearly simultaneously to this, on the occasion of some relative's passing, I wondered to my brother John about the family roots."

Overall, the framework for the novel derives from storytelling and, "all that architecture is, I hope, invisible to the reader."

== Novels ==
Rare Birds follows the life of a Newfoundlander, Dave Purcell, who starts up a restaurant after a job loss in the fishing industry. With help from his friend, Phonse, a rumour is started about a rare bird, which gets the business running again.

In The Nine Planets Riche's main protagonist, Marty Devereaux, dislikes everyone and everything. Marty is a principal at a private school and is on a quest to discover a new brand of education from the global market. On top of meeting new people and discovering a new sense of self, Marty is forced to relate with his niece even though he dislikes teenagers.

== Film and television screen plays ==
- Made in Canada: "Episode Biopic", "People of the Earth", "Private Sector"
- Secret Nation
- Life with Derek
- The Boys of St. Vincent
- Impromptu
- How to Be Deadly

== Theatre plays ==
- Possible Maps
- List of Lights
- To Be Loved
- Tell Tale Harbour

== Articles ==
- Summer Fiction Parts 1-5- The Globe and Mail
- Not So Natural- The Globe and Mail

== Bibliography ==
- Rare Birds - 2001
- The Nine Planets - 2004
- Easy to Like - 2011
- Today I Learned It Was You - 2016
