= Andy Jones (comedian) =

Canadian comedian

- Born: Andrew Jordan Jones; January 15, 1948 (age 78); St. John's, Newfoundland
- Occupations: Actor, comedian, writer
- Years active: 1974–present

Andrew Jordan Jones CM ONL (born January 15, 1948) is a Canadian comedian, actor, writer, and a former member of CODCO.

== Early life ==
Andy Jones was born in St. John's, Newfoundland. He is one of four children of Michael Jones and Agnes Dobbin. He is the brother of comedian Cathy Jones and filmmaker Michael Jones (1944–2018). Andy Jones attended St. Bonaventure's College until grade eight and then attended Gonzaga High School for the next three years. He received a BA. in Theology and English from St. Mary's University (Halifax) and then studied drama at University of Alberta in Edmonton and at the University of Toronto, acting in campus productions.

== Career ==
In England he performed with the Ken Campbell Roadshow (Upstairs at The Royal Court, 1972) and later with the Madhouse Company Of London (1973–1974). In Newfoundland he performed with The Newfoundland Travelling Theatre Company. He joined the CODCO stage comedy troupe in 1974 and later wrote for and performed in four seasons of the CODCO comedy television series (1988–1991). He wrote for one season of The Kids in the Hall, and played a small role in their feature film Brain Candy. His adaptation of Molière's Tartuffe played at the National Arts Centre in 2013, toured Newfoundland in 2017 and was published by Boulder Press in 2014.

In addition to his role as Tartuffe, Jones has performed at the National Arts Centre as Scrooge in A Christmas Carol in 2016 and 2017.

Jones has made appearances in CBC Television comedies Dooley Gardens, Republic of Doyle and Little Dog, in the principal role of Lowly Ross Sr. Jones also made an appearance in the Netflix series, Below.

Jones also starred in, co-wrote, and co-directed the 1986 feature film The Adventure of Faustus Bidgood, and has acted in the films Multiple Choice, Paint Cans, Extraordinary Visitor, Rare Birds, How to Be Deadly and Sweetland. Since 1983 he has written, starred in and toured five one-man comedy shows. In July 2006, he opened an exhibit at The Rooms museum in St. John's called "The Spirit in the House". A part of the "Intangible Evidence" exhibit, the central installation continues to tour art galleries, schools, and libraries (it is a 10-foot x 3 foot illustrated manuscript/table, called 'The Abbie Table'.)

Jones has written six children's books based on Newfoundland Folktales. His book Jack and Mary in the Land of Thieves won the Winterset Award in March 2013, and Jack, the King of Ashes was a shortlisted nominee for the Governor General's Award for English-language children's illustration at the 2015 Governor General's Awards.

He was named a Member of the Order of Canada in 2019 and a Member of the Order of Newfoundland and Labrador in 2024.

=== Books ===
- Peg Bearskin, 2003
- The Queen of Paradise's Garden, 2009
- Jack and Mary in the Land of Thieves, 2011
- Jack, the King of Ashes, 2014
