= Acoustic – Friends & Total Strangers =

2009 live album by the Trews

Acoustic-Friends and Total Strangers

Live album by the Trews
- Released: October 6, 2009
- Recorded: Glenn Gould Studio; January 30–31, 2009
- Genres: Hard rock, alternative rock
- Label: Bumstead
- Producer: John-Angus MacDonald

The Trews chronology
| No Time for Later (2008) | Acoustic-Friends and Total Strangers (2009) | Hope & Ruin (2011) |

Acoustic – Friends & Total Strangers is both a live acoustic album and a music DVD by Canadian rock band the Trews. The CD is the fifth commercial album and second live album by the band. The DVD is the first from the band. Both were released October 6, 2009 on Bumstead Records. It was recorded January 30–31, 2009 at the Glenn Gould Studio in Toronto.

== CD track listing ==
1. "Poor Ol' Broken Hearted Me" – 4:14 (originally from Den of Thieves)
2. "Den of Thieves" – 3:57 (Den of Thieves)
3. "The Traveling Kind" – 3:14 (Den of Thieves)
4. "When You Leave" – 4:14 (House of Ill Fame)
5. "I Can't Stop Laughing" – 3:57 (No Time for Later)
6. "Locked Doors" – 3:59 (Never released on an album)
7. "Fleeting Trust" – 3:21 (House of Ill Fame)
8. "Gun Control" – 4:03 (No Time for Later)
9. "Tired of Waiting" – 4:18 (House of Ill Fame)
10. "The Love You Save" – 3:59 (cover of the 1966 Joe Tex song "The Love You Save (May Be Your Own)")
11. "Sing Your Heart Out" – 5:24 (Never released on an album)
12. "Man of Two Minds" – 4:36 (No Time for Later)
13. "Ishmael and Maggie" – 4:40 (Den of Thieves)
14. "So She's Leaving" – 3:31 (Den of Thieves)
15. "Hold Me in Your Arms" – 3:35 (No Time for Later)

== DVD track listing ==
A DVD was also released by the band, which was recorded concurrently with the CD.

1. "Poor Ol' Broken Hearted Me"
2. "Paranoid Freak"
3. "Den of Thieves"
4. "Yearning"
5. "The Travelling Kind"
6. "When You Leave"
7. "I Can't Stop Laughing"
8. "Locked Doors"
9. "Hollis & Morris"
10. "Fleeting Trust"
11. "Gun Control"
12. "Montebello Park"
13. "Tired of Waiting"
14. "The Love You Save"
15. "Sing Your Heart Out"
16. "Man Of Two Minds"
17. "Ishmael & Maggie"
18. "So She’s Leaving"
19. "Hold Me In Your Arms"
20. "You’re So Sober"
21. "The Pearl"
22. "How’s Everything?"
23. "Served My Time"

== Deluxe Edition track listing ==
On November 27, 2015, a deluxe edition was announced with a re-release of the songs from the original album, but including four new songs that were not included on the original album or the DVD.

1. "Poor Ol' Broken Hearted Me"
2. "Den Of Thieves"
3. "The Travelling Kind"
4. "When You Leave"
5. "I Can't Stop Laughing"
6. "Locked Doors"
7. "Fleeting Trust"
8. "Gun Control"
9. "Tired Of Waiting"
10. "The Love You Save"
11. "Sing Your Heart Out"
12. "Man Of Two Minds"
13. "Ishmael & Maggie"
14. "So She’s Leaving"
15. "Hold Me In Your Arms"
16. "Every Inambition"
17. "Makin' Sunshine"
18. "No Time For Later"
19. "Not Ready To Go"

== Personnel ==
The Trews

- Colin MacDonald – lead vocals, guitar, harmonica
- John-Angus MacDonald – lead guitar, vocals, bouzouki
- Jack Syperek – bass, vocals
- Sean Dalton – percussion, vocals

Additional musician

- Jeff Heisholt – accordion

Technical personnel

- John-Angus MacDonald – production, mixing
- Dennis Patrerson – recording, mixing
- João Carvahlo – mastering
- Nancy Derosiers – photography

== Charts ==
Chart performance for Acoustic – Friends & Total Strangers
| Chart (2009) | Peak position |
|---|---|
| Canadian Albums (Nielsen SoundScan) | 36 |

== Certifications ==
Certifications for Acoustic – Friends & Total Strangers
| Region | Certification | Certified units/sales |
|---|---|---|
| Canada (Music Canada) | Gold | 40,000^{‡} |
^{‡} Sales+streaming figures based on certification alone.
