= The Trews =

Canadian rock band

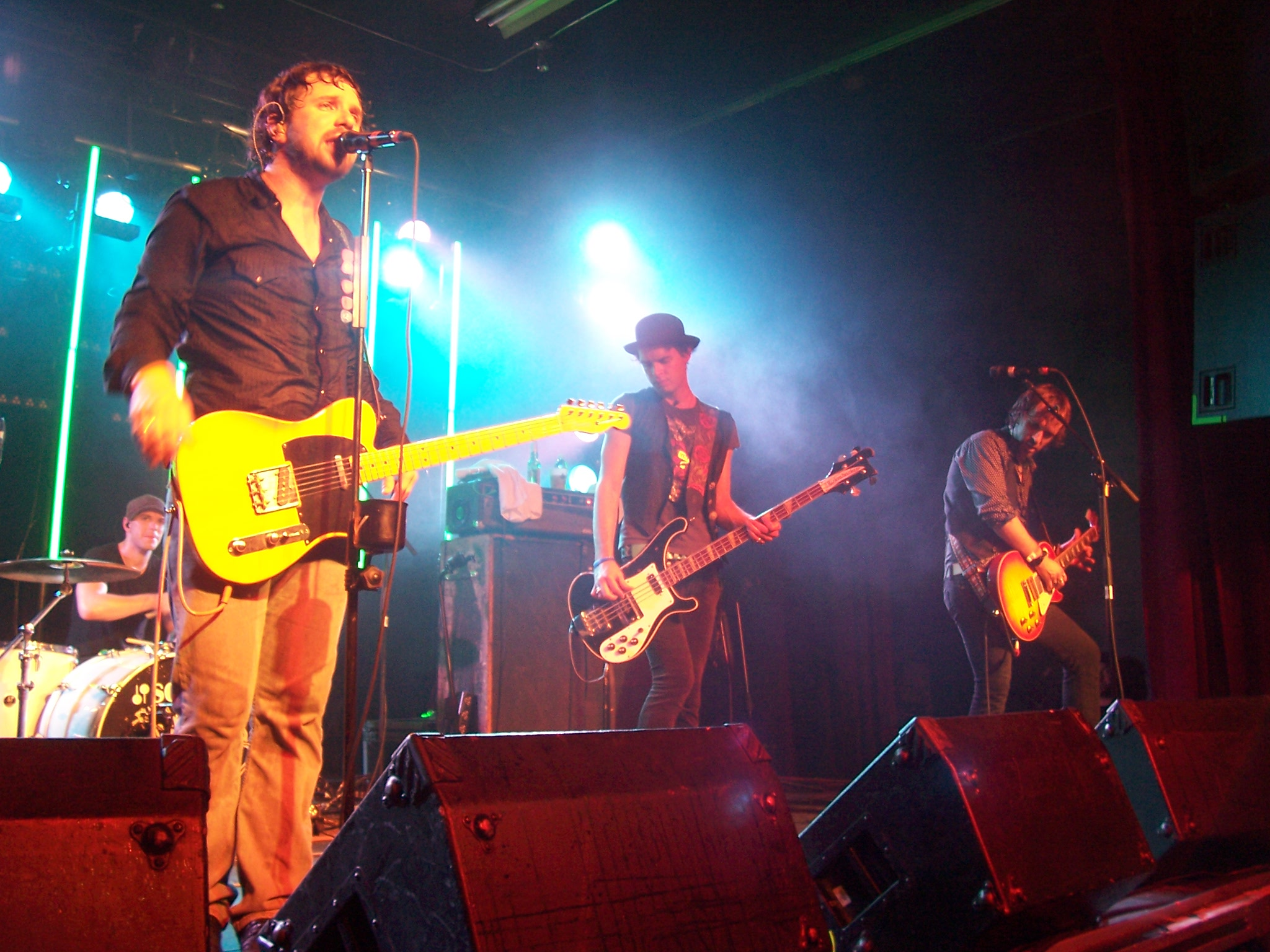
- The Trews at Capital Music Hall in Ottawa, May 2008

Background information
- Also known as: One I'd Trouser; Trouser
- Origin: Antigonish, Nova Scotia, Canada
- Genre: Rock
- Years active: 1997–present
- Label: Nettwerk Music Group / Cadence Music Group / Known Accomplice
- Members: Colin MacDonald; John-Angus MacDonald; Jack Syperek; Theo Mckibbon
- Past members: Ramsey Clark; Rose Murphy; Sean Dalton; Gavin Maguire; Chris Gormley
- Website: thetrewsmusic.com

The Trews are a Canadian rock band from Antigonish, Nova Scotia, consisting of vocalist Colin MacDonald, guitarist John-Angus MacDonald, bassist Jack Syperek, and drummer Theo Mckibbon. The band is currently based in Hamilton, Ontario. From their formation in 1997 to 2016, The Trews were among the top 150 best-selling Canadian artists in Canada and among the top 40 best-selling Canadian bands in Canada.

== History ==
The band started their career with the name One I'd Trouser, a line taken from a song in Monty Python's The Meaning of Life. They changed their name to Trouser and eventually changed their name to The Trews. They released an EP as One I'd Trouser, and a second EP under the name The Trews.

In the early summer of 2002, the band entered Rocksearch, a high-profile contest that is held annually by CHTZ-FM, a St. Catharines rock radio station. Winning the contest would prove to be their big break as they soon landed a recording contract with Bumstead Productions.

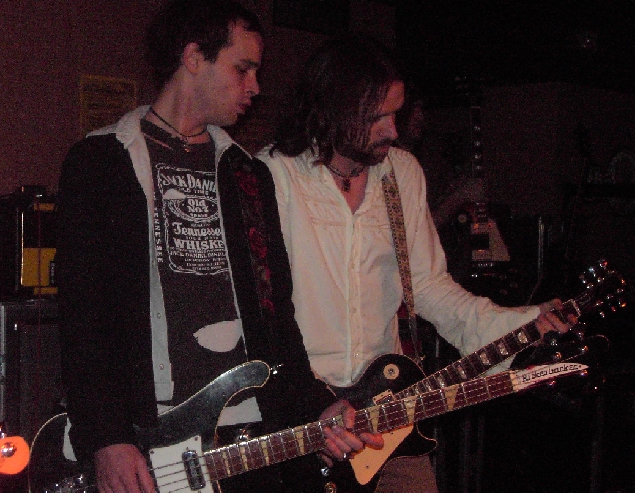
Trews bassist Jack Syperek with guitarist John-Angus MacDonald, 2005

The release of their first full-length CD House of Ill Fame followed in 2003. Produced by Big Sugar's Gordie Johnson, the album contained the singles "Every Inambition", "Not Ready to Go", "Tired of Waiting", "Fleeting Trust" and "Confessions". "Not Ready to Go" hit number one on Canadian rock radio and was the most played song of 2004 in that format. The band was nominated as New Group of the Year at the 2004 Juno Awards and "Not Ready to Go" was nominated as Single of the Year in 2005. House Of Ill Fame has been certified platinum in Canada. It was re-released with a bonus live album called The Live Cut which featured live versions of songs taken from the album.

The song "Hollis and Morris" on their first album, refers to an intersection in the city of Halifax and not an intersection in Antigonish as previously speculated. The band has mentioned during concerts and in interviews that the corner of Hollis and Morris is notorious for prostitution.

The band released a follow-up to House of Ill Fame on August 16, 2005. The album, Den of Thieves, was produced by legendary producer Jack Douglas (Aerosmith, Cheap Trick, John Lennon, New York Dolls). The first single, "So She's Leaving", was released to radio June 28, 2005, and was followed by the singles "Yearning", which was their second single to reach number 1, "Poor Ol' Broken Hearted Me", and "I Can't Say". In the summer of 2005, the band was invited to share the stage with the Rolling Stones at the Phoenix Concert Theatre in Toronto as part of the Stones' Bigger Bang Tour. In fall of the same year, they were invited to open for Led Zeppelin singer Robert Plant on his cross-Canada arena tour. Den of Thieves was certified Canadian Gold in April 2006. The album was released 18 April 2006 in the United States on Red Ink and Sony BMG.

The Trews were nominated in the Best New Band category in Classic Rock magazine's 2007 Classic Rock Roll of Honour Awards. Issue #104 of the magazine (the April 2007 edition) also included a four-track promotional EP entitled Out of the Past, Into the Dark.

The Trews' third album, No Time for Later, was released in February 2008. The first single, "Hold Me in Your Arms", was made available on 25 November 2007. It premiered at the 2007 Grey Cup pre-game show and was immediately released on iTunes; the video for the song eventually went to number one on MuchMusic for a week in April 2008. In early 2009, "Hold Me in Your Arms" won in The 8th Annual Independent Music Awards (US) for Best Hard Rock/Metal Song. A bonus song called "Long Way from Freedom" was included with the single but was not released on the album. "Hold Me in Your Arms" went on to spend 22 weeks in the top ten at rock radio in Canada and in May 2010 was certified Canadian gold the commemorate the sales of over 20,000 digital downloads. In early February 2008, the band added keyboardist Jeff Heisholt to their live lineup. The second single from No Time for Later was "Paranoid Freak", the video for which was released in May and went straight into rotation on MuchMusic. The third single, a ballad called "Man Of Two Minds", was released September 8, 2008, and the video reached number one on MuchMusic sister station MuchMoreMusic. The fourth single, "Can't Stop Laughing", was sent to radio in January 2009 with a video that followed in April and became the band's tenth single to enter the top ten at Canadian rock radio. The band was nominated for two Juno Awards in 2009, Album of the Year (for No Time for Later) and Group of the Year.

No Time for Later was released in the United States on April 7, 2009, on Merovingian Music. The first single "Paranoid Freak" was sent to radio a few weeks prior to its release and was added in heavy rotation at Sirius Satellite Radio's Alt. Nation. The second single in the US was "Hold Me In Your Arms" and garnered significant play at Active Rock.

Their second live album, Acoustic - Friends & Total Strangers, released October 6, 2009, was an acoustic session recorded over two nights at Toronto's Glenn Gould Studio in January 2009 for a live audience. It was released without any edits or overdubs and was produced by the band's guitarist John Angus MacDonald. There is also a 23-song DVD of the same name available which captures the second nights performance in its entirety as well as candid interviews with the band. The release earned the band their fifth Juno nomination for DVD of the year in 2010. The album's only single, "Sing Your Heart Out", a new song written specifically for the performances, won Best AAA/Alternative Song at the 2010 International Acoustic Music Awards (US).

Following Acoustic - Friends & Total Strangers the band released the single "Highway Of Heroes". It was inspired by the 2006 death of Capt. Nichola Goddard, the first Canadian female soldier killed in Afghanistan and a schoolmate of members of the Trews. It refers to the stretch of Highway 401 in Ontario, between CFB Trenton and downtown Toronto, where hundreds gather on bridges and overpasses to mourn soldiers killed in Afghanistan while the bodies of the fallen soldiers are transported from Trenton to the coroner's office in downtown Toronto. The song was made available on iTunes in Canada only, with all proceeds from the sales of the song going to the Canadian Hero Fund, a charity that provides academic scholarships to the spouses and children of soldiers killed in combat. In October 2014, "Highway of Heroes" was certified Gold in Canada for sales of over 40,000 digital downloads. The song remained popular, and was certified platinum in 2022.

In November 2010, the band performed the Canadian National anthem at the 98th Grey Cup in Edmonton.

The band's fourth studio album, Hope & Ruin was released on April 12, 2011. The album was co-produced by John-Angus MacDonald and the Tragically Hip's Gord Sinclair and was recorded at the Hip's own Bathouse Studio in Bath, Ontario. The album was mixed by Canadian engineer/mixer Mike Fraser (AC/DC, Franz Ferdinand, Aerosmith, Mother Mother). The first single "Hope and Ruin" entered the top ten at Canadian rock radio within 3 weeks of its release. The video for "Hope and Ruin" received significant play on MuchMoreMusic. The second single and video from the album, "The World, I Know", received significant play. The third single from Hope and Ruin was "Misery Loves Company". Hope & Ruin was released in Australia, and title track received heavy airplay on Australian rock radio chain triple M; the band toured the continent three times during the album cycle. Hope & Ruin was also released in the United Kingdom, with "The World, I Know" acknowledged in the Top Songs of 2011 by Classic Rock Magazine. The band toured the UK and the USA heavily during this time. In August 2012, the band supported Bruce Springsteen at Magnetic Hill outside of Moncton, New Brunswick. They were invited by Bruce to join him in his encore for a 10-minute rendition of "Twist and Shout."

On November 6, 2012, the band issued a 7-song EP entitled ...Thank You and I'm Sorry. Co-produced by John-Angus MacDonald and Gordie Johnson, the EP features guest appearances by The Black Crowes' Rich Robinson as well as ex-Black Crowes Eddie Harsch. Ian McLagan of Small Faces and the Faces also makes an appearance. The EP's first single "The Power of Positive Drinking" received extensive airplay across Canada reaching number 1 on the CBC rock chart the week of December 7, 2012.

In April 2014, the band released their fifth full-length studio album, eponymously titled The Trews. It was the band's highest charting debut to date reaching No. 1 on the Rock, Alternative and Independent Album Charts and #3 on the overall chart in Canada. The album's lead single, "What's Fair is Fair" reached No. 2 on the Canadian Rock radio chart, and its video received play on Canadian music video stations. The album's second and third singles, "Rise in the Wake" and "New King", also reached the Canadian Rock radio charts. In the August 2014 edition of the UK's Classic Rock Magazine (issue #201), 90,000 copies of The Trews were distributed free with the magazine. In September 2014, the band took part in the first ever CapeFest in Sydney, Cape Breton, Nova Scotia along with Slash and Aerosmith.

In September 2016, the band released Time Capsule, a 20-song album that included 16 of their greatest hits as well as 4 brand new recordings. The album's lead single was "Beautiful & Tragic". In support of the album, the band launched a Canadian tour in the fall of 2016 and joined Weezer on tour in the spring of 2017.

On March 16, 2018, the band released "The New US" to radio as the new single from their forthcoming album. The song stirred up some controversy with its political lyrics that took aim at Donald Trump and the United States. A second radio single, "Vintage Love", was released on June 22 and became the band's 18th single to chart top ten at active rock radio in Canada. A bonus track from the album entitled "Bar Star" was also released on July 29. The new album, entitled Civilianaires, was released on September 14, 2018. It debuted at number 1 on the Alternative Album charts in Canada, number 3 on the Digital Current chart and number 6 overall on the Current Album Chart. The band supported the album with tours in the US in the fall of 2018 and Canada in early 2019. Civilianaires was nominated Rock Album of the Year at the 2019 Juno Awards. This was the band's sixth Juno nomination to date.

In September 2019, with no announcements or fanfare, the Trews released "Touch", a song they had recorded earlier that spring with Civilianaires producer Derek Hoffman. The video was shot in one day and was directed by John-Angus MacDonald; it is a single-shot from beginning to end, only their second video to be shot in this format. The second song from that session, "God Speed Rebel", was released in April 2020 during the global COVID-19 pandemic. The band recorded the video using Zoom video chatting technology, one of the first groups to do so, and all proceeds from the song, including views on YouTube and streams on Spotify and Apple Music, go to the Unison Benevolent fund, a Canadian arts charity that supports musicians and those in the music industry in times of emergency. The band also canvassed for videos from their fans of them lip-syncing along with the song, and created another version of the video that was released with the title "Stay Home Rebel".

In April 2021, the Trews released the single "I Wanna Play," a song inspired partly by the COVID-19 pandemic. The music video featured an appearance by photographer and musician Bob Lanois and was filmed shortly before his sudden death. "I Wanna Play" ended up charting in the top ten at rock radio in Canada, becoming their 19th single to do so. In the fall of 2021, the band released its seventh full-length studio album Wanderer, composed mostly of songs that were written and recorded during the COVID-19 pandemic and subsequent lock downs. The album featured production work from Derek Hoffman, Eric Ratz, Rich Robinson (of the Black Crowes), and John-Angus MacDonald. The band spent the better part of the following two years getting back out on the road post lock down, and to promote Wanderer, with tours of Canada and the U.S. which included many headlining dates as well as support slots for the Black Crowes, Stone Temple Pilots, and Mumford and Sons. In the summer of 2023, the band released a one-off single called "Peace Jam" which was produced by the band and Mark Howard. The song was inspired by the recent turmoil of global events.

In late 2023, the band celebrated the 20th anniversary of its debut album, House of Ill Fame, with the release of a 20th anniversary deluxe box of the album set that included 20 bonus tracks as well as a vinyl version of "the Live Cut" and a 20-page book. In early 2024, the band toured Canada playing House Of Ill Fame in its entirety for the first time ever.

In the summer of 2024, the three principle members of the band were invited to perform "Highway of Heroes" on Juno Beach in Normandy, France, for the 80th anniversary of the D-day invasions. The performance was broadcast live around the world and audience members in attendance included Prince William, Canadian Prime Minister Justin Trudeau, and French Prime Minister Gabriel Attal, among others.

The band spent much of the summer and fall of 2024 in the studio completing work on their eighth studio album. In February 2025, the band released The Bloody Light and followed that up one month later with the radio single "The Breakdown". "The Breakdown" reach number 1 on Canadian Rock Radio in May of 2025, their third single to do so.

The band's eighth studio album, The Bloody Light, was released in the fall of 2025. The album was co-produced with Brett and Jay Emmons of the Glorious Sons.

=== Dalton's departure ===
On 14 July 2015, drummer Sean Dalton stepped down from the band sending this message to fans via email:

"To all the hard core Trewbadours out there: Well what can I say folks its been an amazing run. The years playing with the Trews have been best years of my life. Countless hours in the jam space and playing thousands of live shows all over the world have shaped me as a musician, and playing with such great guys has made me a better human being. I will miss it very much.

Due to unforeseen circumstances, I've decided to step down from the drum throne. Nothing weird goin' on here folks...just time to do what's best for me and the family. I wish the Trews nothing but the best, and was so fortunate to play with the best friggin' band in the country. I'll be hanging with you all in the crowd at the next show."

Gavin Maguire took over as the band's drummer. In November 2023, Theo Mckibbon replaced Chris Gromley as the band's drummer.

Dalton has since taught music. In 2024, he had his first major acting role as the lead character in Nik Sexton's theatrical film Skeet, for which he received a Canadian Screen Award nomination for Best Lead Performance in a Drama Film at the 13th Canadian Screen Awards in 2025.

== Discography ==
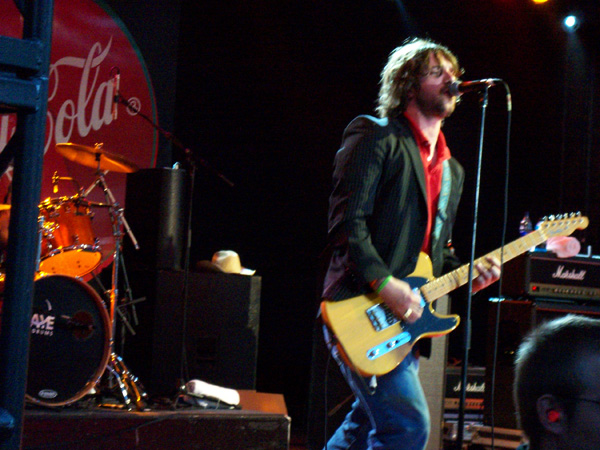
Colin MacDonald performing in Calgary, 2006

=== Studio albums ===
Year	Title	Peak chart positions	Certifications
Year	Title	CAN	CAN
2003	House of Ill Fame	—	Platinum
2005	Den of Thieves	6	Gold
2008	No Time for Later	4	Gold
2011	Hope & Ruin	9	
2014	The Trews	3	
2018	Civilianaires	30	
2021	Wanderer	4	
2025	The Bloody Light		

=== Compilations ===
Year	Title	Chart positions	Certifications
Year	Title	CAN	CAN
2016	Time Capsule	23	Gold

=== EPs ===
Release date	Title	Label
1997	The Trouser E.P.	Bumstead Recording
2002	Trews E.P.	Bumstead Recording
2007	Out of the Past, Into the Dark	Classic Rock – ROC104-04-07H
2011	A Trew Holiday Gift	Bumstead Recording
2012	...Thank You and I'm Sorry	Bumstead Recording

=== Live albums ===
Release date	Title	Label
November 30, 2004	House of Ill Fame – The Live Cut	Bumstead Recording
October 6, 2009	Acoustic – Friends & Total Strangers	Bumstead Recording
November 25, 2015	Acoustic – Friends & Total Strangers: Deluxe Edition	Bumstead Recording

=== Video albums ===
Release date	Title
October 6, 2009	Acoustic – Friends & Total Strangers

=== Singles ===
Year	Song	Peak chart positions		Certifications	Album
Year	Song	CAN	CAN Rock		Album
2002	"Confessions"	—	—		Trews E.P.
2003	"Every Inambition"	—	—		House of III Fame
2003	"Not Ready to Go"	—	1	CAN: Platinum	House of III Fame
2004	"Tired of Waiting"	74	8	CAN: Gold	House of III Fame
2004	"Fleeting Trust"	—	11		House of III Fame
2005	"So She's Leaving"	42	5		Den of Thieves
2005	"Yearning"	20	1		Den of Thieves
2006	"Poor Ol' Broken Hearted Me"	58	3		Den of Thieves
2006	"I Can't Say"	—	16		Den of Thieves
2007	"Hold Me in Your Arms"	34	3	CAN: Gold	No Time For Later
2008	"Paranoid Freak"	84	6		No Time For Later
2008	"Man of Two Minds"	—	15		No Time For Later
2009	"(I) Can't Stop Laughing"	—	10		No Time For Later
2009	"Sing Your Heart Out"	—	30		Acoustic – Friends & Total Strangers
2010	"Highway of Heroes"	61	29	CAN: Platinum	Non-album single
2011	"Hope & Ruin"	78	5		Hope and Ruin
2011	"The World, I Know"	—	11		Hope and Ruin
2011	"Coming Home"	—	41		A Trew Holiday Gift
2012	"Misery Loves Company"	—	8		Hope and Ruin
2012	"One by One"	—	—		Hope and Ruin
2012	"The Power of Positive Drinking"	—	15		...Thank You and I'm Sorry
2014	"What's Fair Is Fair"	92	2		The Trews
2014	"Rise in the Wake"	—	18		The Trews
2014	"New King"	—	11		The Trews
2015	"Under the Sun"	—	30		The Trews
2016	"Beautiful & Tragic"	—	14		Time Capsule
2017	"Lotta Work/Little Love"	—	47		Time Capsule
2018	"The New Us"	—	41		Civilianaires
2018	"Vintage Love"	—	16		Civilianaires
2018	"Bar Star"	—	—		Civilianaires
2019	"Time's Speeding Up"	—	—		Civilianaires
2019	"Touch"	—	—		Non-album single
2020	"God Speed Rebel"	—	—		Non-album single
2020	"1921"	—	—		Non-album single
2021	"I Wanna Play"	—	—		Wanderer
2021	"The Wanderer"	—	—		Wanderer
2021	"Permission"	—	—		Wanderer
2025	"The Breakdown"	—	3		The Bloody Light
2025	"Manifest"	—	—		The Bloody Light

==== Featured singles ====
Year	Song	Peak chart positions	Album
Year	Song	CAN	Album
2012	"I Wanna Know" (Maestro featuring the Trews)	—	Orchestrated Noise
2021	"Ishmael & Maggie (Hermitage Green featuring the Trews)	—	Non-album single

== Band members ==
=== Current ===
- Colin MacDonald - rhythm guitar, lead vocals (1996–present)
- John-Angus MacDonald - lead guitar, backing vocals (1996–present)
- Jack Syperek - bass guitar, backing vocals (1996–present)
- Theo Mckibbon - drums (2024–present)

=== Touring ===
- Jeff Heisholt - keyboards, backing vocals (2008–present)

=== Past ===
- Rose Murphy - drums (1996)
- Ramsey Clark - drums (1997–2001)
- Sean Dalton - drums, backing vocals (2001–2015)
- Gavin Maguire - drums (2015–2018)
- Chris Gormley - drums (2019–2023)

== Nominations and awards ==
=== Juno Awards ===
- 2004: New Group of the Year – Nominated
- 2005: Single of the Year ("Not Ready to Go") – Nominated
- 2009: Group of the Year – Nominated
- 2009: Rock Album of the Year (No Time for Later) – Nominated
- 2010: DVD of the Year "Acoustic: Friends and Total Strangers" – Nominated
- 2019: Rock Album of the Year (Civilianaires) - Nominated

=== East Coast Music Awards (ECMA) ===
- 2005: Group of the Year – Won
- 2006: Video of the Year (So She's Leaving – Director: Stephen Scott) – Won
- 2011: DVD of the Year (The Trews Acoustic – Friends & Total Strangers – Director: Tim Martin) – Won
- 2011: Fan's Choice Video of the Year (Highway of Heroes – Director: Tim Martin) – Won
- 2012: Fan's Choice Entertainer Of The Year - Nominated
- 2012: Fan's Choice Video Of The Year ("Hope & Ruin") - Nominated
- 2012: Group Recording Of The Year ("Hope & Ruin") - Nominated
- 2012: Song Of The Year ("Hope & Ruin") - Nominated
- 2012: Rock Recording Of The Year ("Hope & Ruin") - Won
- 2013: Fan's Choice Entertainer Of The Year - Nominated
- 2014: Fan's Choice Entertainer Of The Year - Nominated
- 2014: Group Recording Of The Year ("...Thank You & I'm Sorry") - Nominated
- 2014: Rock Recording Of The Year ("...Thank You & I'm Sorry") - Won
- 2015: Group Recording Of The Year ("The Trews") - Nominated
- 2015: Rock Recording Of The Year ("The Trews") - Won
- 2015: Fan's Choice Entertainer Of The Year - Nominated
- 2015: Fan's Choice Video Of The Year (What's Fair is Fair -Director: Drew Lightfoot) - Nominated

=== Independent Music Awards (US) ===
- 2008: Best Hard Rock Song ("Hold Me in Your Arms") – Won
- 2009: Vox Pop best Concert Photo taken by Nancy Desrosiers
- 2010: Best AAA/Alternative Song International Acoustic Music Awards (US) "Sing Your Heart Out" - Won
- 2012: Rock Artists / Group Or Duo Of The Year - Nominated

== See also ==
- Canadian rock
- Music of Canada
