= Hope & Ruin (song) =

Single by The Trews

from the album Hope & Ruin
- Released: February 15, 2011
- Genre: Alternative rock
- Length: 4:00
- Label: Universal Music Canada; Bumstead Records
- Songwriter(s): Sean Dalton, Colin MacDonald, John-Angus MacDonald, Jack Syperek, Gord Sinclair
- Producer(s): Gord Sinclair; John-Angus MacDonald

The Trews singles chronology
| "Highway of Heroes" (2010) | "Hope & Ruin" (2011) | "The World I Know" (2011) |

Music video
- "Hope & Ruin" on YouTube

"Hope & Ruin" is a song by Canadian rock band The Trews. It was the lead single and title track from The Trews' fourth studio album, Hope & Ruin.

== Background ==
According to Colin and John-Angus MacDonald, the song was inspired by the song "Fly" by Nick Drake. The title of the song was taken from the cover of a Rolling Stone magazine released in 2009 after Michael Jackson's death which featured the title "Michael Jackson's Final Days: Hope And Ruin". The original opening lyric of the song was "Hope and Ruin, the American Dream".

== Music video ==
The music video for "Hope & Ruin" was directed by Drew Lightfoot, the same man who directed The Trews' video for "Hold Me In Your Arms" in 2007. The video was shot over 4 days on location in Toronto and rural Nova Scotia.

== Charts ==
| Chart (2011) | Peak position |
|---|---|
| Canadian Hot 100 | 78 |
| Canada Rock Chart | 5 |
| Canadian Alternative Rock Chart | 18 |
