= Hope & Ruin =

Studio album by the Trews
- Released: April 12, 2011
- Studio: The Bathouse (Bath, Ontario)
- Genre: Hard rock, alternative rock
- Length: 44:41
- Label: Bumstead Records; Universal
- Producer: Gord Sinclair; John-Angus MacDonald

The Trews chronology
Friends & Total Strangers (2009)	Hope & Ruin (2011)	The Trews (2014)

Singles from Hope & Ruin
- 1. "Hope & Ruin" Released: February 15, 2011; 2. "The World, I Know" Released: 2011; 3. "Misery Loves Company" Released: 2012

Professional ratings
Review scores
Source	Rating
AllMusic	3/5 stars
Chart Attack	3.5/5 stars

Hope & Ruin is the fourth full-length studio album by Canadian rock band the Trews. It was released in Canada on April 12, 2011, and it peaked at number nine on the Canadian Albums Chart.

== Track listing ==
All tracks are written by the Trews (Colin MacDonald, John-Angus MacDonald, Jack Syperek and Sean Dalton) and Gord Sinclair, unless otherwise noted

No.	Title	Writer(s)	Length
1.	"Misery Loves Company"		2:59
2.	"One By One"		3:42
3.	"People of the Deer""		4:03
4.	"Stay With Me"		3:45
5.	"Hope & Ruin"		4:01
6.	"If You Wanna Start Again"		4:37
7.	"The World, I Know"	The Trews, Gord Sinclair, Dave Rave	2:42
8.	"Dreaming Man"		3:53
9.	"I'll Find Someone Who Will"	The Trews, Sinclair, Ron Hynes	3:42
10.	"Love Is The Real Thing"		3:06
11.	"Burned"		5:09
12.	"You Gotta Let Me In"		3:02

== Personnel ==
Credits adapted from the album's liner notes.

The Trews

- Colin MacDonald – lead vocals, guitar, keys
- John-Angus MacDonald – guitars, backing vocals
- Jack Syperek – bass, backing vocals
- Sean Dalton – drums and percussion, backing vocals

Additional musicians

- Jeff Heisholt – keys
- Gord Sinclair – harmonica ("Love Is The Real Thing"), bass ("The World, I Know"), acoustic guitar ("Dreaming Man")
- Erika Nielson – cello ("If You Wanna Start Again" and "You Gotta Let Me In")
- Kate MacDonald and Peggy Dalton – backing vocals ("You Gotta Let Me In")

Production

- Aaron Holmberg – engineer
- Nyles Spencer – assistant engineer
- Mike Fraser – mixing (The Warehouse Studio)

Artwork

- Ryan Hryciuk – packaging design
- Kayla Rocca – "Hope" photo
- David Bastedo – band photo
