= Ephraim Ellis =

Canadian actor

- Born: Ephraim Todd Ellis; February 23, 1985 (age 41); Toronto, Ontario, Canada
- Education: Earl Haig Secondary School
- Occupation: Actor
- Years active: 2003–present

Ephraim Todd Ellis (born February 23, 1985) is a Canadian actor. He is best known for playing Rick Murray on Degrassi: The Next Generation and Danny Ellis on Falcon Beach.

== Early life ==
Ephraim Ellis was born in Toronto, Ontario on February 23, 1985. His mother is an artist and jeweler, while his father is a visual artist and former stage manager for The Second City in Toronto.

Ephraim began acting while studying at Earl Haig Secondary School in Toronto, Ontario as part of the Claude Watson School of the Arts program. Ephraim attended Earl Haig at the same time as fellow Degrassi co-stars Jake Epstein and John Bregar.

== Career ==
Ephraim Ellis' first television role was an eight episode arc during seasons three and four of Degrassi: The Next Generation. He played Rick Murray, the character who famously shot and paralyzed Jimmy Brooks, the character played by Aubrey 'Drake' Graham.

After appearing on Degrassi, Ephraim appeared on such varied television shows such as Naturally Sadie, Wild Card, and Sue Thomas, F.B.Eye before landing the series lead role of Danny Ellis in the Global Television / ABC Family drama series Falcon Beach. Falcon Beach ran for two seasons until 2006, when it was cancelled as a result of ABC Family's decision to decline bringing the series back for a third season.

Concurrently with Falcon Beach, Ephraim also appeared as Riley Kineston in seasons two and three of the YTV sci-fi series Zixx, as Dylan in seasons four and five of the APTN series renegadepress.com, and in the Canadian Film Centre's short feature White Out, which premiered at the Toronto International Film Festival.

Soon afterwards, Ephraim played the role of Eli Keller on the YTV sitcom Family Biz which filmed in Ottawa during the summer of 2008.

In 2009, Ephraim appeared in the Canadian Film Center horror/comedy web-series Seth On Survival as the title character, supernatural survivologist Seth Greening. In 2011, the series spawned a spin-off web-series, Your Lupine Life, where Ephraim reprised the role of Seth, as well as writing the episode in which he appeared. As a tie-in to the two web-series, Ephraim also wrote and published a book, Archie Hartigan & The Frost Wolf, a young adult fiction novel set in the same universe as Seth On Survival and Your Lupine Life.

Ephraim appeared in several episodes of season four of Murdoch Mysteries, as Toronto Gazette reporter Paddy Glynn.

From 2011 to 2016, Ephraim was a member of the Toronto sketch comedy troupe The Rocket Scientists alongside Brandon Hackett, Kevin MacNeil, and Chris Small.

Ephraim appeared alongside Minnie Driver and Meat Loaf in the 2014 horror/musical/comedy film Stage Fright. Later that year, Ephraim took on the role of Hedwig in the Lower Ossington Theatre's production of Hedwig & the Angry Inch, in a performance Toronto's Now Magazine said "achieves emotional depth, telling stories of love and betrayal, revealing a poignant loneliness beneath the makeup, sparkly costumes and iconic blond wig," and that "Ellis has the manic energy and singing chops to deliver in this difficult role." Ephraim later returned to the Lower Ossington for Legally Blonde and two productions of Jesus Christ Superstar.

Ephraim continued to make forays into the world of Ontario theatre in productions of Perfect Wedding at the Lighthouse Festival Theatre in Port Dover, Barefoot In The Park at Upper Canada Playhouse, and The Money Tree for Toronto's Roseneath Theatre for Young Audiences.

In 2018, Ephraim reunited with his Degrassi co-stars to appear in the music video for Drake's single "I'm Upset", reprising his role as Rick Murray.

== Personal life ==
Ephraim lives in Toronto, Ontario with his wife (a stage manager), and their cat.

== Filmography ==
=== Film ===
Year	Title	Role	Notes
2004	Headhunter	Teen	Short Film
2004	White Out	Wade	Short Film
2005	I Do, They Don't	Jeff Barber	TV movie
2005	Falcon Beach	Danny Ellis	TV movie
2006	Booky Makes Her Mark	Georgie	TV movie
2012	Roomies	Brandon	Short Film
2014	Stage Fright	Sam Brownstein	
2016	Deadly Inferno	Victor	TV movie
2019	Claws of the Red Dragon	Sam Costello	
2021	The Wedding Ring	Ryan	TV movie

=== Television ===
Year	Title	Role	Notes
2003–2004	Degrassi: The Next Generation	Rick Murray	8 episodes
2004	Wild Card	Gerald Wilkins	1 episode
2004	Sex Traffic	Billy Harlsburgh	2 episodes
2005	Sue Thomas: F.B.Eye	Nelson Carlyle	1 episode
2005	Zixx: Level Two	Riley Kineston	13 episodes
2005	Naturally, Sadie	Vince	4 episodes
2005–2007	Falcon Beach	Danny Ellis	27 episodes
2007	Renegadepress.com	Dylan	7 episodes
2007	The Gathering	Miles Woollacott	2 episodes
2008	The Curse of Degrassi	Rick Murray (voice)	1 episode
2009–2011	Seth on Survival	Seth Greening	12 episodes (web series)
2009–2011	Family Biz	Eli Keller	26 episodes
2009–2011	Zixx: Level Three	Riley Kineston	13 episodes
2010	Warehouse 13	Terry	1 episode
2011	Murdoch Mysteries	Paddy Glynn	4 episodes
2012	XIII: The Series	Frederick Barnowsky	2 episodes
2015	Man Seeking Woman	Tim	1 episode
2019	V-Wars	Charlie	1 episode
2020	PAW Patrol	Percy	1 episode (voice)

=== Theatre ===
Year	Title	Role	Notes
2009	Rumors	Leonard Ganz	Abrams Studio Theatre
2011	Zugzwang	Sidney	Summerworks Festival
2014	Hedwig & The Angry Inch	Hedwig	Lower Ossington Theatre
2015	Legally Blonde	Emmett Forrest	Lower Ossington Theatre
2015	Jesus Christ Superstar	Pontius Pilate	Lower Ossington Theatre
2016	Perfect Wedding	Tom	Lighthouse Festival Theatre
2016	Jesus Christ Superstar	Jesus	Lower Ossington Theatre
2017	The Money Tree	Simon	Roseneath Theatre U.S. Tour
2017	Barefoot In The Park	Paul Bratter	Upper Canada Playhouse
2018	Don't Quit Your Day Job	Self	Cabaret Show

=== Radio ===
Year	Title	Role	Notes
2011	Afghanada	Maj. Torbin	CBC Radio Drama
2012	Trust, Inc.	Serge Swift	CBC Radio Drama

Music Video
Year	Title	Artist	Role
2018	I'm Upset	Drake	Self
