= No Time for Later =

Studio album by The Trews
- Released: February 19, 2008
- Recorded: 2007
- Genres: Hard rock, alternative rock
- Length: 49:27
- Labels: Bumstead, Universal
- Producers: Gus Van Go, Werner F

The Trews chronology
| Den of Thieves (2005) | No Time for Later (2008) | Friends & Total Strangers (2009) |

No Time for Later is the third full-length album by Canadian rock band The Trews. It was released February 19, 2008 on Bumstead Records. It was recorded in 2007, and produced by Gus Van Go and Werner F. The first single, "Hold Me in Your Arms" was released on November 25, 2007.

== Recording ==
Following the release of Den of Thieves, the members of the band started work on No Time for Later and brought in two new producers: Gus Van Go and Werner F. The group rehearsed for several months and narrowed a group of over 30 songs to the thirteen that made the final album. A song called "Long Way from Freedom" was also recorded for the album, but was not included. It was later added to The Trews' website as a free download. The album was recorded in mid-2007 in Toronto and Brooklyn.

Singer Simon Wilcox helped write the title track. According to John-Angus MacDonald, the title came from a discussion between Wilcox and lead singer Colin MacDonald. Colin said "there's no time for later, we'll finish the song" and Wilcox, not realizing that Colin wasn't referring to a song, responded with "No, let's work on that song." Following the discussion, MacDonald quickly wrote a verse and chorus in about five minutes.

The song "Gun Control" was written following the Virginia Tech massacre on April 16, 2007. John-Angus MacDonald said "We were sitting around the apartment and watching all the coverage from CNN and Fox, it just seemed so blatantly obvious they were beating around the bush. The problem was how did this kid have a gun in the first place? It's a personal and political view from us."

== Singles ==
The first single, "Hold Me in Your Arms", was released on November 25, 2007. It premiered at the 2007 Grey Cup pre-game show and was immediately released on iTunes. The music video premiered on January 9, 2008. The second single, "Paranoid Freak", was released April 2008. It has quickly gained radio-play in Canada. The third single was "Man of Two Minds" released September 2008.

The Albums latest single is "Can't Stop Laughing" which was co-written by Ron Hynes.

== Reception ==
Professional ratings
Review scores
| Source | Rating |
|---|---|
| Vancouver Sun | 3/5 stars |
| AllMusic | 3.5/5 stars |

Amy O'Brian of the Vancouver Sun described the album as "nothing particularly ground-breaking [...] but it is a raucous romp of guitars, drums and even a taste of bagpipes. It's a strong set of 13 songs over 50 minutes." She criticized the choice for the cover art, writing "it's a shame they chose the cover art that they did because there are certain people (such as myself) who will judge an album by its cover before listening to it. [...] It's neither a flattering nor fitting image for The Trews."

The songs "Paranoid Freak" and "Dark Highway" were used in the eighth season premiere of the hit Canadian drama Degrassi: The Next Generation.

The album debuted at #4 on the Canadian Albums Chart but fell from the top ten the following week.

== Track listing ==
All tracks written by Colin MacDonald, John-Angus MacDonald, Jack Syperek and Sean Dalton unless otherwise noted.

1. "No Time for Later" – 3:27 (Colin MacDonald, John-Angus MacDonald, Simon Wilcox)
2. "Dark Highway" – 3:19
3. "Be Love" – 3:20
4. "I Feel the Rain" – 3:55
5. "Paranoid Freak" – 4:22 (Colin MacDonald, John-Angus MacDonald, Syperek, Dalton, Gordie Johnson)
6. "I Can't Stop Laughing" – 3:22 (Colin Macdonald, John-Angus MacDonald, Syperek, Dalton, Ron Hynes)
7. "Man of Two Minds" – 3:59 (Colin MacDonald, John-Angus MacDonald, Wilcox)
8. "Hold Me in Your Arms" – 3:07
9. "Gun Control" – 3:58
10. "Will You Wash Away" – 3:19
11. "End of the Line" – 4:49 (Colin MacDonald, John-Angus MacDonald, Syperek, Dalton, Gus van Go)
12. "Burning Wheels" – 3:18
13. "Ocean's End" – 5:11
14. "Mistress Misery" - 4:09 (iTunes exclusive)

== Personnel ==
Personnel taken from No Time for Later liner notes.

The Trews

- Colin MacDonald – vocals, guitar
- John-Angus MacDonald – guitar, vocals
- Jack Syperek – bass, vocals
- Sean Dalton – drums, vocals

Additional musicians

- Liam O'Neil – Hammond B3 organ, piano
- Darius Kaufmann – bagpipes

Production

- Gus van Go – production, mixing
- Warren F. – production, mixing, engineering
