= Mark O'Brien (actor) =

Canadian actor and director (born 1984)

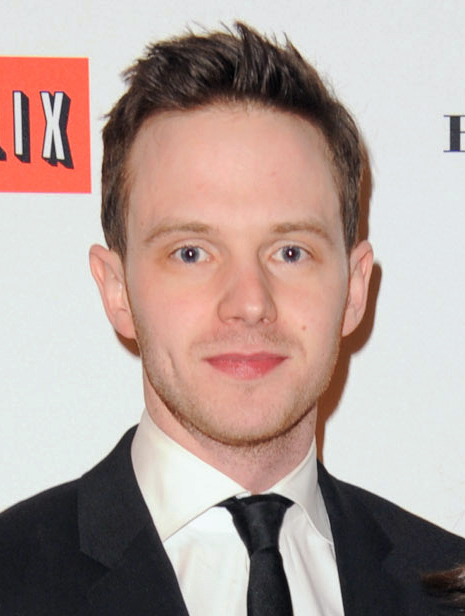
- O'Brien in 2013
- Born: May 7, 1984 (age 42); St. John's, Newfoundland, Canada
- Occupations: Actor, director
- Years active: 2005–present
- Spouse: Georgina Reilly (m. 2013)
- Children: 1

Mark O'Brien (born May 7, 1984) is a Canadian actor and director best known for his roles as Des Courtney in Republic of Doyle (2010–2014) and Tom Rendon in Halt and Catch Fire (2015–2016). He won the Canadian Screen Award for Best Actor at the 8th Canadian Screen Awards for his performance as Terry Sawchuk in the biographical drama film Goalie (2019).

At the 10th Canadian Screen Awards in 2022, he received two nominations for his film The Righteous, for both Best Supporting Actor and Best Original Screenplay. The film, which he wrote and directed himself, also won Best Screenplay at the Fantasia International Film Festival in Montreal and Manchester's Grimmfest, as well as Best Cinematography at Grimmfest and the Blood in the Snow Canadian Film Festival.

== Personal life ==
He is an English major with a Bachelor of Arts from Memorial University of Newfoundland. His mother was a nurse and his father a truck driver. O'Brien also has three older sisters.

O'Brien married actress Georgina Reilly on January 6, 2013, after having met on the set of Republic of Doyle in 2011. He is friends with fellow Newfoundlander Jonny Harris, who was also guest at his wedding. In November 2017, the couple welcomed their first child, a daughter.

== Filmography ==
=== Film ===
| Year | Title | Role | Notes |
|---|---|---|---|
| 2009 | Quiet at Dawn | Watts | |
| 2009 | Grown Up Movie Star | Will | |
| 2012 | Beat Down | Michael | |
| 2015 | End of Days, Inc. | Jason | |
| 2015 | Len and Company | Zach | |
| 2015 | How to Plan an Orgy in a Small Town | Bruce Buck | |
| 2016 | Arrival | Captain Marks | |
| 2018 | Parallel | Josh | |
| 2018 | State Like Sleep | Darren | |
| 2018 | Anon | Cyrus Frear | |
| 2018 | How It Ends | Jeremiah | |
| 2018 | The Darkest Minds | Rob Meadows | |
| 2018 | Kin | Jake Stanton | |
| 2018 | The Front Runner | Billy Shore | |
| 2018 | Bad Times at the El Royale | Larsen Rogers | |
| 2019 | Goalie | Terry Sawchuk | |
| 2019 | Ready or Not | Alex Le Domas | |
| 2019 | Marriage Story | Carter | |
| 2019 | Hammer | Chris Davis | |
| 2021 | The Righteous | Aaron Smith | Also director |
| 2021 | Blue Bayou | Ace | |
| 2023 | Seven Veils | Paul | |
| 2025 | Nuremberg | John Amen | |
| 2026 | The Voices of Our Mother | William | Also director |
| 2026 | The Outer Threat | Daniel | |

=== Television ===
| Year | Title | Role | Notes |
|---|---|---|---|
| 2004–2007 | Kids' CBC | Himself | |
| 2005–2006 | Legends and Lore of the North Atlantic | | |
| 2006 | Above and Beyond | Drake | 2 episodes |
| 2008 | The One That Got Away | Tommy Palchek | TV movie |
| 2010–2014 | Republic of Doyle | Des Courtney | 77 episodes |
| 2011 | Warehouse 13 | Jerry Hoffler | Episode: "Don't Hate the Player" |
| 2012 | Diary of a Deadly P.I. | Des Courtney | 12 episodes |
| 2012 | Murdoch Mysteries | Jerome Bradley | Episode: "Murdoch Night in Canada" |
| 2013 | This Hour Has 22 Minutes | Des Courtney | |
| 2014 | Hannibal | Randall Tier | 2 episodes |
| 2014 | Saving Hope | Marshall Parker | Episode: "Awakenings" |
| 2015–2017 | Halt and Catch Fire | Tom Rendon | 15 episodes |
| 2016–2017 | The Last Tycoon | Max Miner | 9 episodes |
| 2019–2021 | City on a Hill | Jimmy Ryan | 14 episodes |
| 2022–2023 | 61st Street | Officer Johnny Logan | Main role |
| 2023 | Your Honor | Father Jay | 3 episodes |
| 2023 | Perry Mason | Thomas Milligan | Recurring role |
| 2025 | The Copenhagen Test | Cobb | Main cast |
| 2026 | Trinity | Brian York | Recurring role |

=== Director, producer and writer ===
| Title | Year | Credited as | | | | | Notes | Ref(s) |
| Title | Year | Director | Writer | Producer | Actor | Other | Notes | Ref(s) |
|---|---|---|---|---|---|---|---|---|
| Downward Calling | 2005 | Yes | Yes | Yes | Yes | Yes | Short film Editor | |
| Lying Awake | 2006 | Yes | Yes | Yes | Yes | Yes | Short film Cinematographer, composer and editor | |
| Pretty Girls | 2008 | Yes | No | No | No | Yes | Short film Editor and cinematographer | |
| Brad | 2010 | No | No | Yes | Yes | Yes | Short film Editor | |
| Kathy | 2011 | Yes | No | No | No | No | Short film Editor | |
| Better People | 2012 | Yes | Yes | No | Yes | Yes | Short film Editor | |
| Sweetieface | 2013 | Yes | No | No | Yes | Yes | Short film Editor | |
| Dennis | 2015 | No | No | Yes | Yes | No | Short film Editor | |
| Who Is Hanna? | 2015 | Yes | No | No | No | No | Short film | |
| Wanderer | 2015 | Yes | No | Yes | Yes | No | Short film | |
| Threshold | 2018 | Yes | Yes | No | No | No | Short film | |
| Goalie | 2019 | No | No | Yes | Yes | No | | |
| The Righteous | 2021 | Yes | Yes | Yes | Yes | No | | |
