= How to Be Deadly =

- Film poster
- Directed by: Nik Sexton
- Written by: Nik Sexton; Edward Riche
- Produced by: Mary Sexton
- Starring: Leon Parsons; Gina Cook
- Cinematography: Sam Pryse-Phillips
- Edited by: Miles Davren
- Music by: Colin Kelday
- Production company: Rink Rat Productions
- Distributed by: Union Pictures
- Release date: September 12, 2014 (AIFF)
- Running time: 88 minutes
- Country: Canada
- Language: English

How to Be Deadly is a 2014 Canadian comedy film, directed by Nik Sexton. The film stars Leon Parsons as Donnie Dumphy, an unemployed slacker in St. John's, Newfoundland and Labrador, who enters a minibike competition in the hopes of winning back his ex-girlfriend Brenda (Gina Cook) after she breaks up with him due to his lack of ambition.

The cast also includes Ashley Billard, Dan Bochart, Robbie Carruthers, Kate Corbett, Sean Dalton, Lisa Doucette, Dominique Girouard, Annie Hennessey, Andy Jones, Cathy Jones, Dennis Kavanah, Susan Kent, Greg Malone, Mary Walsh, Andrew Younghusband and Rick Mercer in supporting roles.

The film premiered at the 2014 Atlantic International Film Festival, and went into commercial release in 2015.

== Production ==
The lead character had previously appeared in numerous short comedy videos that the filmmakers had posted to YouTube, including a music video called "Havin' a Time". A 15-minute short film version of How to Be Deadly screened at the 2012 Toronto International Film Festival, and the full feature film version went into production in 2013 in St. John's and Mount Pearl.

In addition to being described in its short film showing at TIFF as "the Newfoundland Trailer Park Boys-slash-Fubar", the feature film also served as an unofficial tribute to the Newfoundland sketch comedy troupe CODCO, with all of the troupe's living members making appearances in the film; Tommy Sexton, the troupe's deceased member, was Nik Sexton's uncle and producer Mary Sexton's brother.

== Awards ==
The film won the Canadian Comedy Award for Best Feature Film at the 16th Canadian Comedy Awards in 2015. Sexton was also nominated for Best Direction in a Feature Film.
