= Not Ready to Go =

Single by the Trews

from the album House of Ill Fame
- Released: 2003
- Genre: Hard rock
- Length: 2:55
- Label: Epic
- Songwriters: Sean Dalton, Gordie Johnson, Colin MacDonald, John-Angus MacDonald, Jack Syperek

The Trews singles chronology
"Every Inambition" (2003)	"Not Ready to Go" (2003)	"Tired of Waiting" (2004)

"Not Ready to Go" is a song by Canadian rock band the Trews. It was released in 2003 as the second single from their debut album, House of Ill Fame. The song was the first song by an independent band to reach #1 in Canadian radio chart history. It was the most played song on Canadian Rock Radio in 2004.

== Chart positions ==
Chart (2004)	Peak position
Canada Rock Top 30 (Radio & Records)	2

== Certifications ==
Region	Certification	Certified units/sales
Canada (Music Canada)	Platinum	80,000^{‡}
^{‡} Sales+streaming figures based on certification alone.

== Awards and nominations ==
It was nominated for "Single of the Year" at the 2005 Juno Awards, although it lost to K-os' song "Crabbuckit". It also received a nomination for "Single of the Year" at the 2005 East Coast Music Awards, and lost to "Sunburn" by Gordie Sampson, however, the group won the award for "Group of the Year".
