= House of Ill Fame =

Studio album by The Trews
- Released: August 19, 2003
- Studio: Phase One, Toronto; Metalworks, Mississauga, Ontario
- Genre: Hard rock, alternative rock
- Label: Epic
- Producer: Gordie Johnson

The Trews chronology
House of Ill Fame (2003)	Den of Thieves (2005)

House of Ill Fame is the first full-length album by Canadian hard rock band The Trews. It was released in 2003 by the label Epic Records. The group issued a music video for the more-alternative rock sounding song "Not Ready to Go". The album was certified Platinum (100,000 copies) in Canada in 2023, the band's first album to do so.

== Track listing ==
No.	Title	Writer(s)	Length
1.	"Every Inambition"	Colin MacDonald, Jack Syperek, John-Angus MacDonald, Sean Dalton	2:57
2.	"Not Ready to Go"	C. MacDonald, Syperek, J-A. MacDonald, Dalton	3:04
3.	"Confessions"	C. MacDonald, J-A. MacDonald	3:01
4.	"When You Leave"	C. MacDonald	3:23
5.	"Tired of Waiting"	C. MacDonald, Syperek, J-A. MacDonald, Dalton, Eric Paul	4:28
6.	"Hopeless"	C. MacDonald, J-A. MacDonald	2:52
7.	"Fleeting Trust"	C. MacDonald, Syperek, J-A. MacDonald, Dalton	3:15
8.	"Why Bother"	C. MacDonald, Syperek, J-A. MacDonald, Dalton	4:03
9.	"Black Halo"	C. MacDonald	2:49
10.	"You're So Sober"	C. MacDonald	3:30
11.	"Hollis and Morris"	C. MacDonald, Syperek, J-A. MacDonald	3:12
12.	"Stray"	C. MacDonald, Syperek, J-A. MacDonald	4:03

A limited edition was also released with a bonus CD of live tracks recorded on September 24, 2004 at the Event In The Tent, St. Catharines, Ontario, Canada presented by the Extreme Music Series.ca.

House of Ill Fame - The Live Cut
No.	Title	Writer(s)	Length
1.	"When You Leave"	C. MacDonald	3:52
2.	"Black Halo"	C. MacDonald	2:55
3.	"Fleeting Trust"	C. MacDonald, Syperek, J-A. MacDonald, Dalton	3:46
4.	"Tired of Waiting/Hey Jude"	C. MacDonald, Syperek, J-A. MacDonald, Dalton, Eric Paul, John Lennon, Paul McCartney	6:02
5.	"So She's Leaving"	C. MacDonald, J-A. MacDonald, Syperek, Dalton, Iain MacDonald	3:18
6.	"Hollis and Morris"	C. MacDonald, Syperek, J-A. MacDonald	7:33

== Personnel ==
Personnel taken from House of Ill Fame liner notes.

The Trews

- Colin MacDonald – lead vocals, rhythm guitar, keys
- John-Angus MacDonald – lead guitar, backing vocals
- Jack Syperek – bass, backing vocals
- Sean Dalton – drums, percussion, backing vocals

Additional personnel

- Gordie Johnson – production, engineering, mixing; banjo on "You're So Sober", rhythm guitar on "Hopeless" and "Fleeting Trust"
- Steve Goode – art direction, design
- David Leyes – photography
- Leslie McLaughlin – stylist

== Certifications ==
Region	Certification	Certified units/sales
Canada (Music Canada)	Platinum	100,000^{‡}
^{‡} Sales+streaming figures based on certification alone.
