= The Righteous (2021 film) =

2021 Canadian film

- Film poster
- Directed by: Mark O'Brien
- Written by: Mark O'Brien
- Produced by: Mark O'Neill; Allison White
- Starring: Henry Czerny; Mimi Kuzyk; Mark O'Brien; Kate Corbett; Mayko Nguyen; Nigel Bennett
- Cinematography: Scott McClellan
- Edited by: K. Spencer Jones
- Music by: Andrew Staniland
- Production company: Panoramic Pictures
- Distributed by: Vortex Media; Arrow Films
- Release dates: August 15, 2021 (Fantasia); June 10, 2022 (Arrow)
- Running time: 97 minutes
- Country: Canada
- Language: English

The Righteous is a 2021 Canadian psychological thriller film, written, executive produced, and directed by Mark O'Brien. The film stars Henry Czerny and Mimi Kuzyk as Frederick and Ethel Mason, a former priest and his wife who are grieving the death of their adopted daughter, when Aaron Smith (O'Brien) arrives at their home, initially in need of help but gradually revealing his real motives for wanting to see Frederick.

The film's cast also includes Kate Corbett as Doris, the troubled birth mother of the Mason's daughter, as well as Mayko Nguyen and Nigel Bennett in supporting roles.

The film premiered at the 2021 Fantasia Film Festival. It was subsequently picked up for streaming distribution in Europe by Arrow Films, while North American distribution will be handled by Vortex Media.

== Plot ==
The film opens with Frederic Mason, a former priest, desperately praying to God for "swift" penance. Frederic and his wife Ethel are mourning the recent death of their young daughter Joanie. His former colleague Graham suggests that her death may be God’s way of telling him to re-join the church, but Frederic believes it was God who took his daughter away. Despite Graham’s worries about his occasional mental lapses, Frederic insists that he return to his isolated countryside home with Ethel.

The couple are visited by their friend Doris, who is Joanie’s birth mother, a fact that Ethel confirms she never told Joanie. That night, a young man emerges from the woods with a sprained foot and asks Frederic for help. Apart from his name, Aaron Smith, the man does not give any credible information about himself, but despite the couple’s suspicion, they let him stay the night. Unable to sleep, Aaron talks over tea with Frederic, telling him that, like Joanie, he is an adoptive child, too. He tells a rambling story about his abusive parents and how he used to be possessed by an inexplicable force as a young child, and then collapses. In the morning, Frederic finds Ethel cheerfully cooking breakfast while singing with Aaron, telling Frederic how thankful she is to God that Aaron is here. Aaron later tells Frederic that he, too, suffers from mental lapses.

The next day, when alone with Frederic, Aaron suddenly begs Frederic to kill him, or he swears to “take Ethel from [him]”. Frederic is angered but Aaron suddenly collapses again. After Ethel is asleep, Aaron reveals to Frederic that he is his penance; when Frederic was praying, Aaron became possessed to run over Joanie with his car. He wandered aimlessly through the woods to look for Frederic, who is revealed to be Aaron’s biological father. Before he met Ethel, Frederic raped a woman in his former parish. She kept quiet to protect the church and then, unbeknownst by Frederic who moved away, died in childbirth. Having never been “possessed of love”, Aaron says he becomes “possessed of something else”. After Frederic refuses to believe him, Aaron reaches out his hand to touch a flower, which instantly wilts.

Frederic sees Graham at church in the morning and confesses, fearing he must make up for a sin by committing another sin. Referencing the Book of Revelation, Graham explains that a sin does not cancel out another, but committing one will not release any "[ball] of fire in the sky", either. He implores that Frederic know the difference between “what’s real and what our conscience has created to punish us”.

That night, Aaron urges Frederic to kill him, but he still refuses, believing that when a man of God commits murder, it will be “the end of all things” and the whole mankind will be punished in “fire and fury”. Doris suddenly arrives and asks Frederic to give her a blessing because she has been having nightmares since Joanie died. When Frederic returns with the Bible, Doris has been stabbed by Aaron, who threatens to kill her unless Frederic agrees to kill him. Frederic still refuses and calls the police, so Aaron throws Doris against the wall to her death with a blow of his breath. Ethel appears and Aaron triggers her bronchitis. Frederic finally stabs Aaron, who dies in his arms, and Ethel recovers. Frederic goes outside as a police officer arrives, then breaks down when he sees four balls of fire descending from the sky in his direction.

== Critical response ==
Briana Zigler of The Film Stage graded the film B−, writing that "In a narrative about religious penance with—albeit, somewhat bafflingly—supernatural flourishes, the script (also penned by O’Brien) is far too reliant on taking the most literal approach possible to its gray subject material. It adds a curious dimension to shooting the film in black-and-white (cinematography credited to Scott McClellan). The Righteous fully embraces murky middle ground of human nature but is far too hesitant to embrace a similarly obscure narrative approach."

For Screen Daily, Allan Hunter wrote that "Working from a modest budget, an inventive O’Brien places his faith in a wordy screenplay and the strength of the performances. Key moments in the film come down to two people talking across a kitchen table with changes in lighting to convey shifting moods. He provides a showcase for himself and the other actors with a static camera focused on them as they deliver lengthy anecdotes, memories or tangled justifications for past acts. Czerny brings gravitas to a man burdened by the weight of his guilt, and Kuzyk is an especially warm, sympathetic presence as the good-hearted Ethel, leaving you wanting more of her character."

On the review aggregation website Rotten Tomatoes, the film holds an approval rating of 92%, based on 50 reviews with an average rating of 7.4/10. The website's critical consensus said, "Assured work from writer-director Mark O'Brien and Henry Czerny's powerhouse performance put The Righteous a cut above the average supernatural thriller."

== Awards ==
Award	Date of ceremony	Category	Recipient(s)	Result	Ref(s)
Fantasia Film Festival	2021	Best Screenplay	Mark O'Brien	Won	
Blood in the Snow Canadian Film Festival	2021	Best Cinematography	Scott McClellan	Won	
Grimmfest	2021	Best Screenplay	Mark O'Brien	Won	
Grimmfest	2021	Best Cinematography	Scott McClellan	Won	
Directors Guild of Canada	2021	Best Direction in a Feature Film	Mark O'Brien	Nominated	
Canadian Screen Awards	2022	Best Supporting Actor	Mark O'Brien	Nominated	
Canadian Screen Awards	2022	Best Supporting Actress	Kate Corbett	Nominated	
Canadian Screen Awards	2022	Best Original Screenplay	Mark O'Brien	Nominated	
