= Mary Sexton =

Canadian film and television producer

Mary Sexton is a Canadian film and television producer, who is partnered with Edward Riche in Rink Rat Productions and with Mary Walsh in 2M Innovative.

She is best known for her 2001 National Film Board documentary Tommy: A Family Portrait, about her brother, comedian Tommy Sexton. Co-directed with Sexton's husband, Nigel Markham, the film received the 2002 Gemini Award for Best History/Biography Documentary program.

Her credits also include the television series Dooley Gardens and Hatching, Matching and Dispatching, and the theatrical films Violet, How to Be Deadly and Maudie. She was also the regional producer in Atlantic Canada for Canadian Idol.

Mary Sexton is a board member of the Canadian Film and Television Producers Association and the president of the Film Producers Association of Newfoundland.

Her son Nik Sexton is a filmmaker best known for the films How to Be Deadly and Skeet.
