= The Trews (album) =

Studio album by The Trews
- Released: April 22, 2014
- Recorded: Noble Street Studios, Toronto, Ontario
- Genre: Rock
- Length: 44:41
- Label: Nettwerk
- Producer: Gavin Brown, John-Angus MacDonald

The Trews chronology
Hope & Ruin (2011)	The Trews (2014)	Time Capsule (2016)

Singles from The Trews
- 1. "What's Fair is Fair" Released: March 4, 2014; 2. "Rise in the Wake" Released: 2014; 3. "New King" Released: 2014

The Trews is the eponymously titled fifth studio album by Canadian rock band, The Trews. The album debuted at No. 3 on the Canadian Albums Chart, the band's highest position on that chart in their history.

== Track listing ==
1. "Rise in the Wake" – 4:00
2. "Age of Miracles" – 3:34
3. "Permanent Love" – 4:44
4. "The Sentimentalist" – 4:18
5. "65 Roses" – 4:00
6. "What's Fair Is Fair" – 3:18
7. "Where There's Love" – 4:40
8. "In the Morning" (featuring Serena Ryder) – 4:34
9. "New King" – 2:38
10. "Living the Dream" – 4:56
11. "Under the Sun" – 3:59

== Personnel ==
- Colin MacDonald – lead vocals, guitar
- John-Angus MacDonald – guitars, background vocals
- Jack Syperek – bass, background vocals
- Sean Dalton – drums, background vocals

Additional musicians

- Jeff Heisholt – keys
- Gavin Brown – keys, percussion
- Serena Ryder – vocals
- Anne Bourne – cello
- Natalie Aikens, Caitlyn Anderson, Marisa Bruch, Samantha Chappell, Tim Des Islets, Erin Kinghorn, Maureen Leeson, Karen McDonnell, Paul Morris, Siobhan Morris, Sharon Vernon – gang vocals
