= Kate Corbett =

Canadian actress

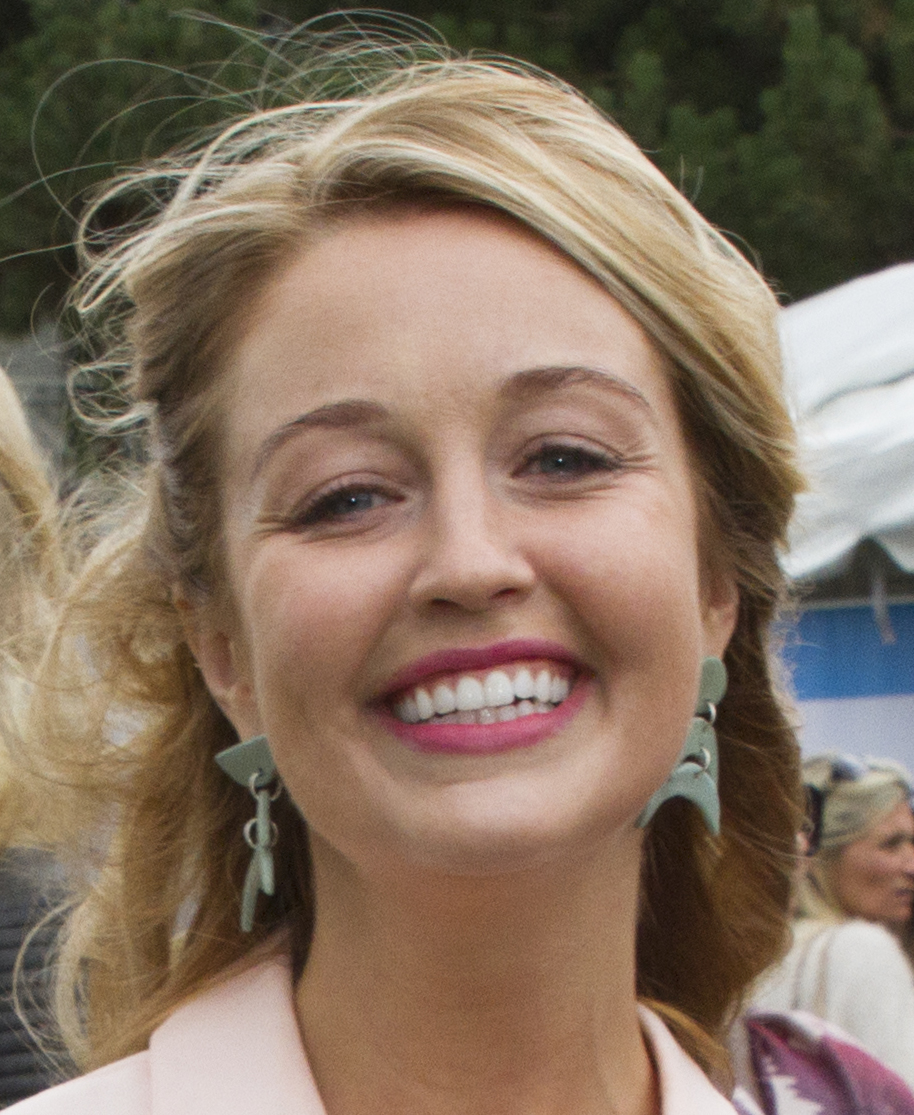
- Corbett in 2018
- Born: Holyrood, Newfoundland and Labrador
- Occupation: actor
- Years active: 2008–present

Kate Corbett (born in Holyrood, Newfoundland and Labrador) is a Canadian actress.

== Early years ==
Corbett started acting at a young age in small town repertoire summer theatre. Once graduating high school, Corbett moved to Toronto, Ontario to go to theatre school at Toronto Metropolitan University; after obtaining her degree, she landed the lead role on Family Biz (Canadian/France co pro) for YTV. She went on to continue her training at the prestigious Canadian Film Centre's Acting Conservatory years later.

== Career ==
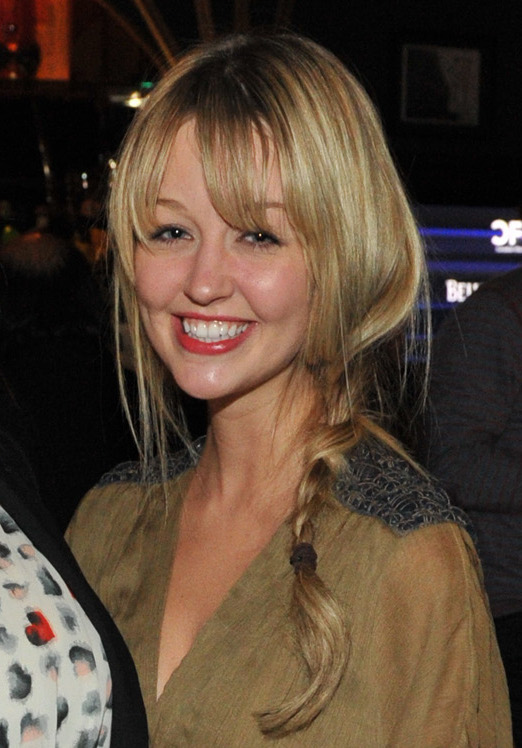
Corbett in 2011

Corbett's feature film credits include three Toronto International Film Festival film selections, The Steps (2015), Empire of Dirt (2013) and The Animal Project (2013); as well as the lead in Once There Was A Winter (2017). She has principal roles in the features Barn Wedding (2014) and How to Be Deadly (2014). Kate has also starred in several short films, including the award-winning How Eunice Got Her Baby (2009) and The Tunnel (2013), which was the Not Short on Talent recipient for Cannes Film Festival and for which she is also the credited writer.

Her television credits include:Good Witch, Fargo, Lost Girl, Signed, Sealed, Delivered, Odd Squad, Republic of Doyle, Satisfaction, Call Me Fitz, The L.A. Complex, InSecurity and Family Biz.

Some of Corbett's more recent theatre credits include; a Canadian Stage English premiere production of Yukonstyle by Sarah Berthiaume and directed by Ted Witzel, as well as a Tarragon Theatre production of Rocking the Cradle by Des Walsh and directed by Richard Rose.

== Filmography ==
=== Film ===
Year	Title	Role	Notes
2009	How Eunice Got Her Baby	Flo	Short
2012	Final View	The Relieved	Short
2013	Empire of Dirt	Wendy	
2013	The Animal Project	Rosie	
2013	The Tunnel (The Big Dirty Ol'Hole)	Penny	Short
2014	How to Be Deadly	Store clerk	
2015	Barn Wedding	Victoria	
2015	Dennis	Tracey	Short
2015	The Steps	Tammy	
2017	Once There Was a Winter	Lady	
2017	Dead Serious	Detective 2	Short
2018	An Audience of Chairs	Bonnie	
2018	The Silence	Hushed Mother	
2019	It Chapter Two	Dean's Mom	
2021	The Righteous	Doris	Nominee — Canadian Screen Award for Best Supporting Actress
2024	Skeet	Leah Locke	

=== Television ===
Year	Title	Role	Notes
2009	Family Biz	Avalon Keller	Main role
2011	InSecurity	Denise	"Agent Oo La La"
2012	The L.A. Complex	Cori	"Rules of Thirds", "Half Way", "Stay"
2013	Satisfaction	Janet	"Janet"
2013	Call Me Fitz	Young Elaine	"O-Rigins"
2013	Republic of Doyle	Melissa	"Major Crimes"
2014	Signed, Sealed, Delivered	Sarah	"The Masterpiece"
2014–15	Lost Girl	Stacey	"Like Hell: Parts 1 & 2", "Sweet Valkyrie High"
2015	Odd Squad	Tennis Lady	"Hold the Door/Flatastrophe"
2015	Fargo	Gloria Wuddle	"Before the Law", "The Myth of Sisyphus", "Fear and Trembling"
2015–2018	Good Witch	Eve	Recurring role
2016	For Love & Honor	Melanie Corbett	TV film
2016	Murdoch Mysteries	Josie	"Painted Ladies"
2019	All My Husband's Wives	Marla	TV film
2022	Murdoch Mysteries	Mrs.Hadley	TV film
2022	Coroner	Cassidy James	"Heartbeet", "Degargoony", "Young Legend", "True Crime", "LJND", "Blast to the Past"
2024	Son of a Critch	Sister Perpetua	4 episodes
2026	The Borderline	Liv	
