= Den of Thieves (album) =

Studio album by The Trews
- Released: August 16, 2005 (CAN); April 18, 2006 (US)
- Genre: Hard rock, alternative rock
- Length: 57:05
- Label: Epic, RED Distribution
- Producer: Jack Douglas

The Trews chronology
House of Ill Fame (2003)	Den of Thieves (2005)	No Time For Later (2008)

Professional ratings
Review scores
Source	Rating
AllMusic	4/5 stars
Chart Attack	4/5 stars

Den of Thieves is the second full-length album by Canadian rock band The Trews. It was released in 2005 on Epic Records, and peaked at number 6 on the Canadian Albums Chart.

The first single from this album was "So She's Leaving", and it was followed by "Yearning", "Poor Ol' Broken Hearted Me" and "I Can't Say".

The album was certified Gold (50,000 copies) by the CRIA in January 2006.

== Track listing ==
All songs by Sean Dalton, Colin MacDonald, John-Angus MacDonald, Jack Syperek unless otherwise noted.

1. "Fire Up Ahead" – 3:01
2. "Makin' Sunshine" – 3:47
3. "Cry" – 3:41
4. "Sweetness" – 3:33
5. "I Can't Say" – 4:19
6. "So She's Leaving" – 3:08
7. "Yearning" – 3:58
8. "The Pearl (More Than Everything)" (Gordie Johnson, MacDonald, MacDonald) – 4:50
9. "Poor Ol' Broken Hearted Me" (Patrick Ballantyne, Johnson, MacDonald, James MacDonald) – 4:18
10. "Ana & Mia" – 3:20
11. "Naked" (Tracy Bonham) – 4:00
12. "Montebello Park" (Johnson, MacDonald, MacDonald) – 3:58
13. "Got Myself to Blame" (featuring Kelly Hoppe) (Dalton, MacDonald, MacDonald, Syperek) – 3:24
14. "The Traveling Kind" – 3:26
15. "Ishmael & Maggie" (Johnson, MacDonald, MacDonald) – 4:20

On the U.S. release, "The Pearl (More Than Everything)" was replaced with "Tired of Waiting" from the Trews' previous album, House of Ill Fame.

=== European Version ===
1. "Fire Up Ahead" – 3:02
2. "Makin' Sunshine" – 3:48
3. "Cry" – 3:41
4. "Sweetness" – 3:33
5. "I Can't Say" – 4:19
6. "So She's Leaving" – 3:08
7. "Takes Me a While" (Den of Thieves outtake) – 2:51
8. "Yearning" – 3:58
9. "Poor Ol' Broken Hearted Me" (Ballantyne, Johnson, MacDonald, James MacDonald) – 4:17
10. "Den of Thieves" (Den of Thieves outtake) – 3:55
11. "Ana & Mia" – 3:20
12. "Naked" (Bonham) – 4:00
13. "Got Myself to Blame" (featuring Kelly Hoppe) (Dalton, MacDonald, MacDonald, Syperek) – 3:24
14. "The Traveling Kind" – 3:26
15. "Ishmael & Maggie" (Johnson, MacDonald, MacDonald) (song ends at 4:19 and contains hidden track "Served My Time" (Den of Thieves outtake), which starts at 8:19) – 11:24

== Personnel ==
The Trews

- Colin MacDonald – vocals, rhythm guitar, keys
- John-Angus MacDonald – lead & rhythm guitar, harmonium, melodica, banjo, mandolin, keys, lap steel, backing vocals
- Jack Syperek – bass, harmonium, backing vocals
- Sean Dalton – drums, percussion, backing vocals

Additional musicians

- Jack Douglas – percussion, backing vocals
- Kelly Hoppe – harmonica on "Got Myself to Blane"
- Amoy & Celia Levy – backing vocals on "Cry" and "Sweetness"
- Steve Wingfield, Gord Myers, Steve McDade – horns on "Cry"
- Attila Fias – piano, B3
- Daniel J. Coe – string arrangements and programming on "I Can't Say"

Technical personnel

- Jack Douglas – production
- Michael Jack – engineer
- Mark Renner – assistant engineer
- Andrew MacNaughtan – photography
