= Family Biz =

- Created by: James Nadler
- Directed by: Craig Pryce; Stephen Scaini; Luc Chalifour
- Starring: Doug Murray; Ephraim Ellis; Kate Corbett; Rebecca Windheim; Lori Alter; John Bregar; Mishael Morgan; Jade Carpenter
- Countries of origin: Canada; France
- Original language: English
- No. of seasons: 1
- No. of episodes: 26

Production
- Production locations: Ottawa, Ontario
- Running time: 30 minutes

Original release
- Network: YTV
- Release: March 6 – December 8, 2009

Family Biz is a Canadian-French television sitcom, filmed in Ottawa, Ontario, Canada starring Doug Murray, Ephraim Ellis and Kate Corbett. Created by James Nadler, the program is currently airing on YTV in Canada and France 2 in France. The first episode was shown on YTV. The program has been rated "C8+" in Canada, where it ran for one season from March 6 to December 8, 2009.

== Description ==
An international co-production between Canada's Muse Entertainment, Summit Crescent Productions and France's Breakout Films, Family Biz centres around three latch key kids, Eli (16), Avalon (15) and Ronnie (11), who have the run of the Keller house. Their corporate parents are too busy at work and teen insanity rules! That is until their Dad, Dave Keller, gets fired and decides to work from the Keller attic. To feel useful, Dave launches the Keller Family Corp. and sets about "reinvolving" himself in the lives of his teenage kids, much to his offspring's total embarrassment. Whenever a problem occurs, Dad looks to his years of business knowledge to find the solution, whether it is getting to know his kids through in-depth marketing surveys or outsourcing all their phone messages to India. But mostly he just drives the Keller kids mad.

== Episodes ==
No.	Title
1	"Shake the Box"
In the series premiere of Family Biz, The kids, led by Eli, Avalon, and Ronnie, hatch a plan to convince him to homeschool them, hoping the pressure causes him to leave. So the Keller children attempt to sabotage their father's new, strict "corporate" household management style after he loses his job, leading to chaotic consequences. When Eli accidentally consumes a crucial dinner, the children must create a makeshift meal for their mother's important boss, navigating the pressures of their father's rules.
2	"Damage Control"
Dad's in the house. And that means big changes for the Keller kids. Ronnie gets an actual bedtime. Avalon loses her cell phone and unlimited calling privileges. And no more killer Keller-Casa parties. Desperate to save her plummeting social stock, Avalon maneuvers Eli into booking the EMO band Yellow Stayne to play a concert at Chez Keller. This will be the house party to end all house parties. And Eli will get to hook up with the super hot Tracey Dupont-Roymont. Now all Eli has to do now is keep Dad out of the house. Just for six hours. How hard can that be? Pretty hard, apparently.
3	"Outsourcing"
Avalon is totally hogging the Keller family phone line. She’s waiting for her crush, bad boy Cody Flowers, to call her back. With Avalon ruling the "Rrrrring", Eli never gets any phone time. And Dave has to fight for his right to make important business calls. Dave vetoes Eli and Av’s suggestion to get a "teen line". Instead Dad outsources and hires Mr. Patel of Bombay Telemarketing to field all the Kellers’ calls. Too bad Mr. Patel refuses to put Cody’s call for Avalon through. Patel feels he should sort out the "good boys" from the "riff raff". Eli, Ronnie and Avalon conspire to overload Mr. Patel’s phone and brain circuits to regain total communication control. Meanwhile, Tonia uses the Keller kids’ taste buds to test out Mother Granola’s latest recipe for chewy beige whole wheat squares.
4	"Don't Sweat the Small Stuff"
Ronnie stresses about a school project. Big time. Dave gives Ronnie some old business advice: "Don’t sweat the small stuff". In fact, he encourages all the Keller kids to focus on the big picture and to worry less about the details. Spelling? A mere technicality. The exact location of Eli’s school trip? Trivial specifics. Tonia takes off to Russia to put down an uprising of crazed cereal consumers. Meanwhile Dad’s new, relaxed approach works great for the Keller kids, until Ronnie brings home an F and Eli ends up on a ski trip in Jamaica.
5	"Go With the Flow Chart"
Eli suffers from an odd aroma. Okay, it’s major B.O. With all that manly testosterone coursing through his system, Eli definitely needs more shower time. But hot water is a limited resource around the Keller house and Avalon calls shower dibs to prepare for her upcoming violin duet with the dreamy Josh Morris. Dad takes drastic measures to keep things fair. GPS anklets to monitor the Keller-ites’ every move? He’ll be able to ration the hot water and know exactly what the Keller kids are up to 24/7.
6	"Blamestorming"
The attic roof collapses. Who’s at fault? Dave and Tonia convene a "Blamestorming" session to get to the bottom of things. As the Keller kids try to pass the buck, their testimony reveals that Eli wanted to play a forbidden pay-per-view boxing match for his buds. Avalon wanted to impress Eli’s hunky friend Cody Flowers with her culinary capabilities. And Ronnie wanted a pet raccoon. A satellite dish, a vicious skunk and Cody Flowers all on one roof? Sounds like Eli, Ronnie and Avalon are collectively to blame for the roof’s collapse. But then Eli and Avalon do a little investigating of their own. They find a hole in their parents’ story, one almost as big as the one in the roof.
7	"High Cost of Management"
In a breathtaking display of speed eating, Eli devours the special roast intended for Tonia’s boss, Mr. Peter Pennyman. Avalon freaks. Pennyman’s coming to dinner tonight. If the dinner is a disaster Mom’s career is over. Meanwhile, Dave calls a family meeting. Not knowing what Eli did, Dave declares that Eli is eating the Kellers into bankruptcy. So Dave creates The Keller Family Corporation Cost Management Committee to control household spending, and appoints Ronnie Keller as the Committee’s manager. Dave and the kids need to come up with a new meal. And fast. Eli and Avalon could order takeout, but if they want money they’ll have to go through Ronnie first. And Ronnie’s tough. Strapped for cash the Keller kids have to work with what they’ve got in the house – Dad’s secret stash of junk food. Tonia’s boss will either be impressed by the Keller Kids’ gut-wrenching, gross-out concoctions or will just be grossed out.
8	"Fine Art of Negotiation"
Eli scores seats for him and his buds to the big basketball game. Avalon snags tickets for her and her gal pals to the Boy Band concert of the decade. There’s just one problem. The game and the concert are on the same night. And there’s only one driver. Dad. Dave encourages Eli and Avalon to negotiate a deal that they can both agree on. The Keller kids come up with the perfect equation: two events plus one minivan equals eight hours of driving for Dad. Dave refuses. There’s only one thing left for him to do. Strike! Meanwhile, Ronnie discovers that she has a real talent for negotiation.
9	"Liquidity"
Eli trashes the wrestling team’s bus while trying to impress Trace. Now he has to pay for the repairs, but he’s broke. Eli needs a money-making plan. A simple plan that doesn’t involve selling Caitlin’s hair or the Keller family’s baby photos. Eli could just get an after school job. Yeah right! Not in this universe. Dave suggests Eli use the concept of liquidity to turn some of his assets into cash. Eli considers liquidating his prized Stratusblast comic collection starring the wrestling superstar Trish Stratus… No way. Rather than make the ultimate sacrifice, Eli stages a fake charity wrestling match to raise the money. And he actually cons Trish Stratus herself to show up. When Trish discovers the charity match is a hoax, she goes ten rounds in the ring with Eli. Ten painful rounds.
10	"Skunkworks"
Eli and Avalon need their freedom back. And that means Dad needs to go back to work. They decide that Dave needs a makeover if he’s ever going to compete in the young, hip job market. So Eli and Av go on a corporate retreat (a "Skunkworks") to reinvent Dad’s image. Dave: Version 2.0 rocks new duds and a new ‘tude, and even scores a new job… As Eli and Avalon’s guidance counselor! Not cool. And Dave has to give Avalon’s class the sex-ed lecture about Tommy the Tadpole and the River of Life. Totally not cool. The Keller kids helped get Dad hired. Meanwhile, Caitlin enlists Avalon to redesign her image. Maybe then Eli will notice Caitlin. Yeah, maybe if she’s playing Silt, the most killer video game of all time.
11	"Out with the Intern"
Dave can’t rely on Eli to handle important Keller Family Corporation duties. So Dave and Ronnie set out to hire a responsible intern for the Family Biz. The winning and grinning candidate is Warren Silver. He’s clever. He’s professional. And he’s been Eli’s nemesis since Grade Three. Warren loves his job and his charm quickly turns to smarm. He gets to show up Eli. And, as an employee of the Keller Family Corporation, Warren can spend quality time with Eli’s flirt-worthy sister, Avalon. (Avalon finds him repulsive but Warren thinks they’re fated to be the super celeb couple, "Warvalon".) Snooping through Eli’s room, Warren uncovers the invitation to Trace Dupont-Roymont’s super-exclusive upcoming party. He forces Dave to blow the whistle. The party gets cancelled. Trace blames Avalon and freezes her out of the Mac-Massey social whirl. Avalon and Eli plan to destroy Warren. He must be fired and fast. How? They convince Warren to be more Dave Keller-like than Dave. They know that will drive Dave nuts. After all, the Keller attic’s only big enough for one Mr. Keller.
12	"Reel World"
The Keller teens decide the only way they’re going to get a break from Dad is to find a new crib to hang in – as contestants on the hit reality television show "Teen Party Palace". Since the totally hip series only accepts online submissions, Eli and Av need to make a slick application video. They need to look totally cool. Problem: they have no camera and no money to rent one. Problem solved. Dave has much experience from his youthful days of dabbling in corporate communications (his short silent film "The Pencil" rocks). With Dave leaping on board as Producer, the kids can rent the professional equipment they need to make a kick-ass audition tape. There’s just one minor detail. Dave thinks that he’s producing the "Keller Family Corporation Instructional Video". Under Dad’s creative control, Eli and Av find themselves captured on tape in some very uncool situations. Eli tries to salvage their audition video before their dorky Dad-directed premiere.
13	"Breakaway"
Eli and Avalon both promise Tracey Dupont-Roymont a ride to the new drive-in movie "First and Last Forever". Too bad neither of them has a license. Or a car. Avalon scours the Mac-Massey High yearbook for potential drivers. Eli enlists Dad’s help to perfect his driving so he can take the road test (for the third time) and actually pass. It’s not like he hasn’t been to Driver’s Ed. It’s just that darn parallel parking issue. Can Eli learn how to drive with Dave’s patented Keller Visualization technique? Well, no. Especially since Eli and Dave never get out of the driveway.
14	"Branded"
Avalon is crushing on Cody Flowers. Too bad Cody can’t remember her name. So Av drags Eli into a scheme to spend more time with Cody – in detention. When that fails, Avalon enlists Dad’s help to make her unforgettable. Dave proposes to turn Avalon into a brand as famous as teen singing sensation Amanda Santa Anna. With Dave’s launch of the Avalon Brand of Liquid Antibacterial Soap, Avalon ends up with more fame (and more detention) than she ever bargained for. Meanwhile, Eli tries to ditch chem class to catch a movie with Caitlin. Unfortunately, now that Avalon’s famous Eli can’t make a move without Avalon’s fans following him.
15	"Shareholders are Revolting"
It’s time again for the Keller Family’s annual vacation! Too bad Dad plans the family’s trips and his vacations are super lame. Eli, Ronnie and Avalon rebel and demand a say in where they’re going this year. Eli wants to snowboard with hot ski bunnies. Avalon wants to shop in Beverly Hills. And Ronnie wants to swim with the dolphins. To keep the peace, Dave issues voting shares in the Keller Family Corporation. The family will vote on a vacation destination at a shareholders meeting. If the Keller kids can stand united, they can outvote their folks and go somewhere cool for once. Unfortunately, the Keller kids discover that they can trade their shares for some awesome stuff (like greasy snacks for Eli and dolphin collectables for Ronnie). And the Keller Family Corporation shares end up in some pretty unexpected hands. It’s the special shareholder’s meeting. No-one knows for sure who owns the Keller Family Corporation. Or where they will be going on vacation. Maybe Cleveland.
16	"Hocus Pocus"
When Eli blows an interview for a summer job to be a costume mascot at an amusement park Dave insists that they find out what went wrong. Dave arranges for a Focus Group to intensely observe Eli and critique his numerous faults. To Eli’s horror, the focus group consists of Trace, Caitlin, Avalon and Dakota Toyota. They’re not exactly objective. And each member of the Focus Group has a different take on how Eli should walk, talks and dress for interview success. Taking their advice, Eli gets more and more confused as he suffers through some of the worst job interviews ever. Meanwhile, Ronnie conducts her own focus group when she spends "Take Your Daughter to Work Day" with her Mom’s assistant, Giles. Giles admits that if he listens to Ronnie, he’ll be president of the company one day.
17	"The Consultant"
Eli wants the newest Silt handheld gaming platform. Avalon yearns for the latest in text messaging, the Boysenberry, so she can keep up with Trace and her social circle. But gadgets cost green and there’s only room in the Keller Family Corporation for one kid to get a raise in their allowance. To objectively decide which kid deserves more dough, Dave brings in The Consultant - Dakota Toyota. Eli thinks he has it made. After all, Dakota is his best bud. So Eli goofs off on all his chores. But Dakota takes his consulting job seriously and awards the raise to Avalon. Avalon gets the promotion in the Keller Corporation, her very own Boysenberry—and more responsibilities and chores than she ever wanted. She needs the Consultant to come back in and issue a new report for the Keller Family Corporation. Problem: Eli and Dakota are not talking. Can Avalon and Ronnie bring the buds back together?
18	"Lockdown"
With the big Mac-Massey school dance right around the corner, Eli is desperate to break through Trace’s popular posse and get her attention. Meanwhile, Avalon is looking for any excuse to keep her crush, Cody, away from her rival. Luck seems to be on their side when their dad, Dave, announces he is leaving town on a business trip. Eli and Avalon immediately scheme to throw a pre-dance "gathering" at the Keller house and invite their crushes. But the plan hits a major wall when little brother Ronnie catches the chicken pox, forcing Dave to cancel both his trip and the party. Refusing to give up, Eli and Avalon realize they can use this to their advantage. They re-invite their friends over under the guise of a Friday night "study group". Their new master plan? Fake a massive chicken pox outbreak at the house so Dave will completely quarantine Casa Keller. If the house goes into lockdown, Eli and Avalon will have Trace and Cody all to themselves for the entire night of the big dance. Everything is going perfectly according to plan—until the Keller kids' unsuspecting guests actually start itching for real.
19	"Corporate Karma"
Avalon, Caitlin and Trace Dupont-Roymont race to collect the most recyclable paper for the Mac-Mass Trash-a-thon. As the competition heats up, Avalon must choose between winning and her friendship with Trace. It does look like "nice girls finish last." So Avalon becomes the ultimate mean girl. She’s tough, ruthless, and dressed all in black. But the meaner Avalon tries to be, the more she helps people by accident. Mean Avalon ends up with more friends and more recyclable paper than she ever dreamed. Meanwhile, Dave and Eli try to build up some good Karma by cleaning up their neighbor lawns. But no one warned Eli about the dangers of killer weeds, elephant dung and Caitlin’s Mom.
20	"Bend the Trend"
Tonia returns from her latest business trip to discover that she is completely out of touch with Avalon. So Tonia decides to learn more about Avalon by observing her in her natural teen environment. She spies on Avalon and her gal pals at the teen hangout, Café Inferno, incognito. Trace and Olivia Ashley Madison see through Tonia’s disguise immediately and, to Avalon’s humiliation, invite her to join them for soy beverages. Tonia’s flair impresses the girls. And they’re mesmerized by Tonia’s incredible stories of world travels and celebrity encounters. Running with the bulls in high heels? Saving Kanye West on a Vespa? Avalon’s mom is deemed way cool. To Av’s horror, Tonia’s style catches on and pretty soon Trace and her Posse are acting, talking and dressing like Tonia. Meanwhile, Eli totally freaks. How can he hook up with Trace if she’s acting exactly like his mother? And worse, Cody Flowers is actually crushing on Tonka, his mother. Now Avalon freaks. Cody is supposed to be crushing on her! Can Avalon reverse the Tonia trend before Mac-Mass High is invaded by mini-Moms? Meanwhile Ronnie works on the recipe for a new super energy mango drink to improve sales at Café Inferno. She tests it on Dad. Big mistake—Dave has way too much energy already.
21	"Negative Feedback"
Eli, Cody and Dakota seemed poised for Rock Stardom with their garage band Feedback. They’ve got it all. The garage. A killer song - "All Hot for the Hottie." And a line-up of girls auditioning to play tambourine. But "creative differences" force Eli to quit Feedback and go solo. Cody and Dakota start their own band and Avalon eagerly signs on as manager to score more time with Cody. Eli is determined to beat "The Cody Flowers Experience" at the MacDonald-Massey Battle of the Bands. Unfortunately, Principal Pal insists only bands can compete not solo artists. So Eli must join forces with Dave and front his Dad’s old high school band, the retro-glam North York Dolls. Wearing Lycra, guyliner and a wig is not exactly what Eli had in mind for his shot at Rock’n’Roll fame.
22	"Trading Up"
Everyone knows that Silt is the most killer video game of all time. And limited copies of the latest version, Silt II: Day of Dredge, go on sale tomorrow when Gamerville opens its doors. Eli and Caitlin, the hardest-core fans of all, are right at the front of the line and plan to stay out all night. But then Eli loses his "first in line" poker chip. Warren Silverman, his nemesis and Gamerville Lineup Monitor, sends Eli to the back of the line. On the way to gamer purgatory Eli passes Dakota Toyota, Ashley Olivia Madison, Cody Flowers and… Avalon? What is she doing there? She’s no gamer. Avalon confesses that the line is her chance to spend hours with Cody Flowers. Dave "coincidentally" drives by the lineup to check up on his teens. Dave is shocked to find Eli slinking to the back. Dave dishes out some classic business advice. Eli’s got to "trade up" to regain the number one spot. But all Eli has to work with is a stale stick of spearmint gum. Lucky for him, Cody Flowers has just downed a whole Garlic Onion Pesto Pizza and needs serious breath management. With skillful bargaining, Eli turns his stick of gum into a baseball cap and then into a hot girl’s phone number and then into a collectible Silt action figure and into… Caitlin’s primo spot at the front of the line. It’s a deal! Action figure for spot number one and a guaranteed copy of Silt II. But when Warren tells Caitlin that the action figure Eli traded to her is a knock off, Eli must make the toughest choice a fan-boy can make: the girl or the game.
23	"Just In Time"
Eli’s always late. Living on "Eli-Time" gets him in trouble at school and with his buds. And now Eli’s 24 hours late for his big date with Trace – a new record! Dave proposes to help Eli get back on track. But since Eli can’t be trusted to stick to Dave’s color-coded schedule, Eli finds himself tied to Dave 24/7…by bungee cords. As Dave and Eli spong and bong through Eli’s busy day, Eli is finally in the right places at the right time. They make it just in time to the comic book store with Caitlin, to check out the cheerleader tryouts with Dakota Toyota and to pick up Ronnie after school. One more stop: Eli’s last chance date with Trace. But Eli finds it impossible to romance a girl when he is joined at the hip with Dave. When will Eli be able to cut the cord with Dad? Meanwhile, Avalon schemes to get revenge on Eli for blowing her shot at the cheerleader tryouts.
24	"Field Test"
Dave finds out that Avalon forged his signature to ditch the Mac-Mass Outward Bound Leadership Weekend. Dave insists that Av participate in a makeup trip to prove that she is a "leader of men" and capable of taking over the Keller Family Corporation some day. Avalon assembles her own team of explorers …who happen to be the hunkiest guys at Mac-Mass High, including Cody Flowers. Hey, if she’s going to be eaten killer squirrels in the wilderness, Av may as well spend her last moments with a bunch of total hot dudes. But when Dave discovers that Avalon’s team is all male, he decides that his daughter needs protection from more than just the squirrels. Dave signs on as "Parent Facilitator" and forces Eli to tag along. Avalon is seriously bummed. How is she supposed to hook up with Cody with her Dad and her brother there? And, worse, Dave steps on Avalon’s toes as Team Leader. He forces the kids to do lame trust exercises AND forgets to pack the food. It’s "The Apprentice" meets "Survivor" as Avalon battles her overbearing Dad, pirates on bikes led by Cap’n Ronnie and severe food poisoning.
25	"Exit Interview"
Avalon is super stoked for her first real date with Cody Flowers. A limo, dinner for two and a hot concert with the man of her dreams? This is going to be the best night of her life! Too bad Dave scares off Cody with his totally embarrassing Pre-Date Screening Questionnaire and credit check. Fed up, Avalon quits the Keller Family Corporation and vows to move into Caitlin’s basement. Surprisingly, Dave accepts Av’s resignation. All she must do is participate in an "Exit Interview". Avalon’s feedback about her working experience in the Family Biz can help Dave improve the management of his Corporation. But when Avalon recounts the zillion times Dave has humiliated her since losing his job, Dave feels regretful about how he treated her boyfriend and that he has failed as CEO of the Keller Corporation. So, as a result, he decides to step down. To Avalon’s horror, he plans to move into Caitlin’s basement too. Avalon gets Eli to conduct an Exit Interview with Dad, in the hopes that Dave will divulge top-secret family information. Eli scores the combo to Dave’s junk food stash and the keys to the car. But being the Keller Family CEO carries WAY too much responsibility for slacker Eli. Before he resigns, Eli must be Exit Interviewed by Tonia. When Eli drives Tonia to quit too, Ronnie becomes the CEO and sole employee of the Keller Family Corporation. Can Ronnie get the Keller Kids to band back together and rehire their parents?
26	"Sell In Depth"
It’s the last week of school. Eli and his buds plot the annual Big Prank to humiliate Coach Haggis. Caitlin is also in on the scheme, but her goal is to make Eli see her as more than just "one of the guys". When Caitlin confesses crushing on Eli to Tonia, Dave overhears and intervenes with some business advice. To impress Eli, Caitlin’s must "sell in depth" and win the approval of Eli’s decision-making network (a.k.a. the Keller family and Eli’s buds). Then Eli’s inner circle will sell Eli on her charms. That should be easy, especially since Dave and Tonia already love Caitlin. Avalon signs on to help if Caitlin lets her in on the Big Prank. But the more time Caitlin spends with the Kellers, the less romance she sees in Eli. And meanwhile Eli realizes that Caitlin is the girl of his dreams. Will all this teen drama mess up this year’s Big Prank?
