= Hold Me in Your Arms (The Trews song) =

2007 single by the Trews

Single by The Trews

from the album No Time For Later
- Released: November 25, 2007
- Genre: Hard rock; alternative rock
- Length: 3:07
- Songwriter(s): Colin MacDonald, John-Angus MacDonald, Jack Syperek and Sean Dalton
- Producer(s): Gus Van Go

The Trews singles chronology
"I Can't Say" (2006)	"Hold Me in Your Arms" (2007)	"Paranoid Freak" (2008)

Music video
- "Hold Me In Your Arms" on YouTube

"Hold Me in Your Arms" is a song by Canadian rock band the Trews. It was the first single released from their third full-length studio album, No Time for Later. It premiered at the 2007 Grey Cup pre-game show and was immediately released on iTunes. It won the "Best Hard Rock" song category at the 8th Annual Independent Music Awards.

== Music video ==
The song's music video spent 17 weeks on MuchMusic Countdown, peaking at number 1 on April 3, 2008.

== Commercial performance ==
"Hold Me in Your Arms" was the eleventh-most played rock song in Canada in 2008. The song was certified Gold in Digital Downloads in Canada in April 2010.

== In popular culture ==
The song appeared on the soundtrack of NHL 2K11 for the Wii, with a snippet of the song also appearing in the game's intro movie, which shows the logos of the then-30 teams in the National Hockey League, before fading to a sleek background full of blues and the image of Vancouver Canucks centre Ryan Kesler that also appears on the game's cover.

== Chart positions ==
Chart (2007)	Peak position
Canada (Canadian Hot 100)	34
Canada Rock (Billboard)	3
