= Jeff Heisholt =

- Born: July 28, 1975 (age 50); Thunder Bay, Ontario
- Genres: Rock n roll
- Occupation: Musician
- Instruments: Keyboards, vocals, guitar, accordion

Jeffrey Thoralf Heisholt (born July 28, 1975) is a Canadian keyboardist, vocalist, composer, broadcaster, and producer. In 1996, he formed Burt Neilson Band, with whom he co-wrote and released four records. The band toured Canada twenty times, played more than 1000 shows and became a staple of the Canadian jamband community. Since 2004, he has played across the country with soul-rocker Peter Elkas and contributed to Elkas's second album, the Charlie Sexton produced Wall of Fire. In early 2008, Heisholt joined Canadian rock band The Trews and has been a part of their live and studio configuration since then.

In 2012, Jeff joined Toronto trio Little Foot Long Foot, writing and producing their 2013 single "Bridge Concerns". In 2013, Jeff also joined the touring lineup of Canadian roots-rock veterans, Skydiggers. Jeff played keys and recorded with Hamilton's Terra Lightfoot from 2015 to 2017.

Heisholt formed Current Fantasy in early 2019, a solo, largely improvised modular and hardware synthesizer electronic project. He also hosted a radio show of the same name from 2020-2022, airing weekly on multiple university radio stations across Canada.

Jeff's mother, Donna Heisholt, is a well known Thunder Bay-based visual artist.

== Discography ==
Julian

- 1994: Julian ep
- 1998: Pinstripe Pop

Burt Neilson Band

- 1998: Burt Neilson Band
- 2000: Orange Shag Carpet
- 2001: Five Alive
- 2004: By the Door

Carrie Catherine

- 2008: Green Eyed Soul

Steven Elmo Murphy

- 2004: Friends and I
- 2006: Open For Business
- 2012: Demon Nights
- 2024: Fore

Peter Elkas

- 2007: Wall of Fire
- 2011: Repeat Offender
- 2018: Lion
- 2025: Sweet Spot

Sean MacDonald & The Astronauts

- 2008: Pink Noise – (track – Please take me off your list)

Trevor Howard

- 2007: The Healing Sessions

The Ragged Bankers

- 2012: The Ragged Bankers

The Trews

- 2009: The Trews Acoustic – Friends and Total Strangers CD
- 2009: The Trews Acoustic – Friends and Total Strangers DVD
- 2010: Highway of Heroes (single)
- 2011: Hope & Ruin
- 2012: Thank You and I'm Sorry
- 2014: The Trews
- 2016: Time Capsule
- 2020: 1921 (Single)
- 2021: Wanderer
- 2025: The Bloody Light

Mark Crissinger

- 2009: Fear No Journey
- 2011: Raw Umber
- 2013: Terra Nova
- 2015: Blues Expression
- 2016: Night Light

w/ John-Angus MacDonald

- 2010: Song For Africa – Rwanda: Rises Up – Yearning

Garth Hudson w/ The Trews

- 2010: Garth Hudson Presents a Canadian Celebration of The Band! – Move to Japan

Dearly Beloved

- 2012: Hawk vs Pigeon – (World Series of Fedoras & Lizard Fight)

Karyn Ellis

- 2013: More Than a Hero

Skydiggers

- 2013: No.1 Northern
- 2017: Warmth of the Sun
- 2020: Lovin You Ain't Easy (Single)

Poor Young Things

- 2013: The Heart. The Head. The End.

Molly Thomason

- 2014: Columbus Field

Meredith Shaw

- 2014: Hardest Goodbye

Jerry Leger

- 2014: Early Riser

The Meds

- 2014: South America

The Honeyrunners

- 2014: EP 2

The Kerouacs

- 2014: The Kerouacs

The Once

- 2014: Departures

Little Foot Long Foot

- 2014: Woman

Tim Chaisson

- 2015: Lost In Light

Rufus Wainright

- 2015: Je reviendrai à Montréal - Single
- 2015: Forever and a Year - from the HOLDING THE MAN Soundtrack

Terra Lightfoot

- 2017: Live in Concert
- 2017: New Mistakes

Eli and The Straw Man

- 2017: Light the World

Whitehorse

- 2018: A Whitehorse Winter Classic

The Proud Sons

- 2018: The Proud Sons
- 2019: Raising Hell (single)

Sarah Jane Scouten

- 2019: Confessions

Current Fantasy

- 2020: Currently Fantastic Vol.1
- 2020: Beforetimes/Aftertimes (single)
- 2021: Rio (single)
- 2022: REMIX - In My Arms - SK Wellington
- 2023: REMIX - Italy (Versions) - SK Wellington

Joan Smith & The Jane Does

- 2020: Where Did You Sleep Last Night (In The Pines) (Single)

Jeen

- 2020: Jeen
- 2021: Dog Bite

Samantha Martin & Delta Sugar

- 2020: The Reckless One
- 2026: A Beautiful Buzz (Live)

Phillip Sayce

- 2024: Hole In Your Soul

Clamp

- 2024: On The Corner At The Centre Of The World - From the movie VESELKA

Bywater Call

- 2025: Hold Me Down (Single)
- 2026: Only (Single)

=== As producer ===
Poor Young Things

- 2011: Get Thorny 3 – Easy

Little Foot Long Foot

- 2013: Bridge Concerns – Single

Mark Crissinger

- 2013: Terra Nova
