= Perfect Wedding (play) =

Perfect Wedding is a British play by Robin Hawdon which has been produced in various countries and languages.

== Characters ==
- RACHEL (The Bride)
- BILL (The Groom)
- TOM (The Best Man)
- JUDY (A Girl)
- JULIE (A Chamber-maid)
- DAPHNE (The Bride’s Mother)

== Productions ==
=== City Theatre, Brno, Czech Republic ===
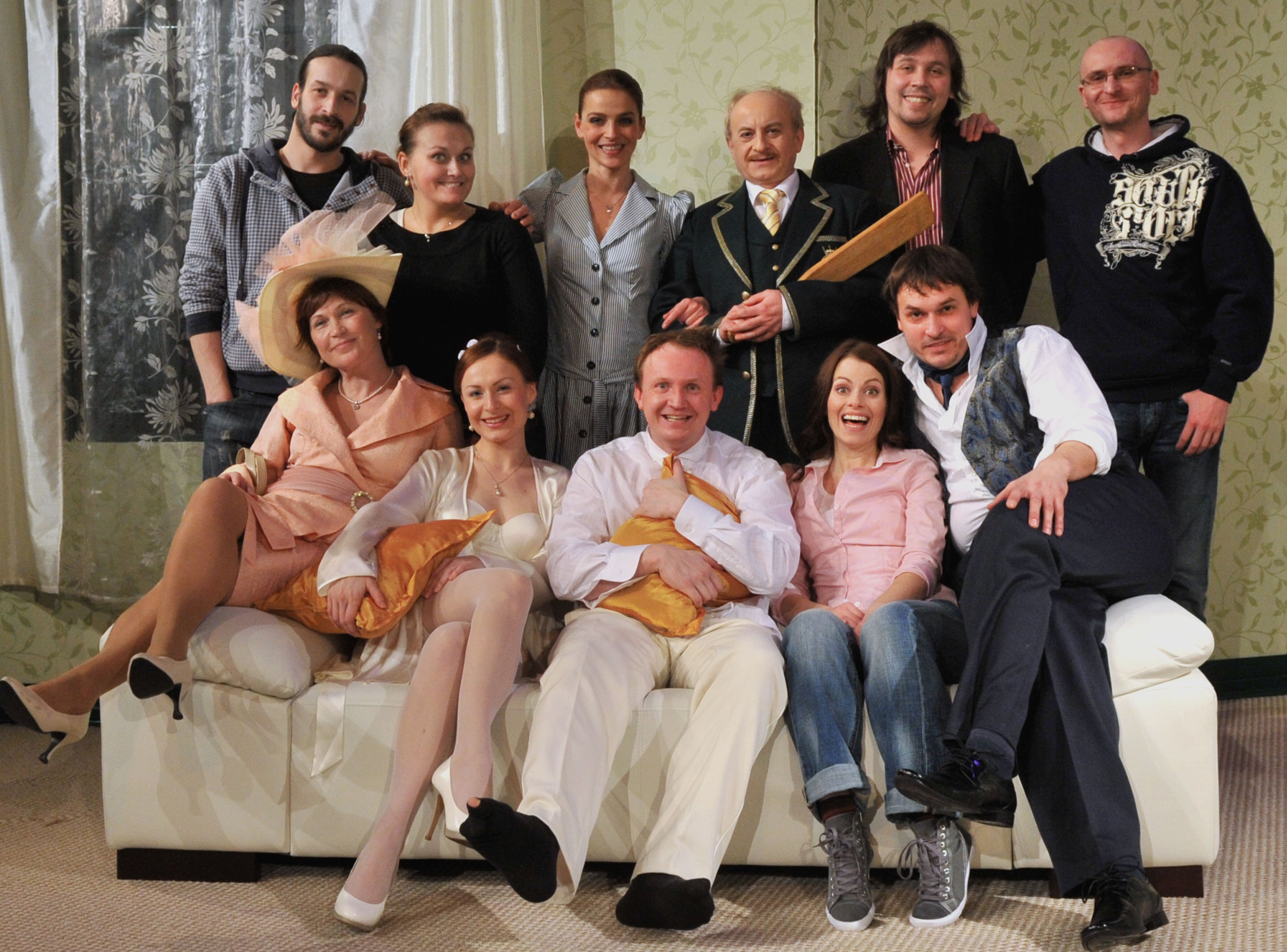
Cast of Perfect Wedding at Brno City Theatre

Directed by Stano Slovák in City Theatre in Brno. Translated by Jan Šotkovský. Video on Youtube. . The premiere had 27 March 2010. The play had 98 reprises.

- Rachel - Svetlana Janotová-Slováková or Lenka Janíková
- Bill - Milan Němec
- Tom - Petr Štěpán
- Judy - Hana Holišová
- Julie - Lucie Zedníčková
- Daphne - Jana Musilová or Ludmila Mecerodová
- Dupont, director of hotel - Zdeněk Bureš

=== City Theatre, Zlín, Czech Republic ===
Directed by Michaela Doleželová and Roman Vencl.

- Bill - Marek Příkazký
- Tom - Radovan Král
- Rachel - Markéta Kalužíková
- Julie - Marie Vančurová
- Daphne - Tamara Kotrbová
- Dupont - Zdeněk Julina
- Judy - Vendula Nováková

=== Theatre U Hasičů, Prague 2, Czech Republic ===
Directed by Lumír Olšovský. Music by Ondřej Ruml. Starring: Filip Tomsa / Michael Vykus / Michal Zelenka, Olga Lounová / Malvína Pachlová, Josef Hervert / Karel Heřmánek ml., Lilian Sarah Fischerová, Jana Trojanová, Vendulka Křížová / Simona Vrbická, David Vejražka.

=== Geva Theatre Center, Rochester, New York, USA ===
Directed by Bruce Jordan. The premiere had 12 February. Starring: Tom Coiner, Cary Donaldson, Brigitt Markusfeld, Kristen Mengelkoch, Kate Middleton, Teri Watts.

=== Market House Theatre, USA ===
Directed by Michael Cochran. Opening in 11 September.

- Bill - Shawn James
- Rachel - Jessica Maynard
- Julie - Katie Hamilton
- Daphne - Melissa Gallip
- Tom - Brian Johnson

=== Gompertz Theatre, Florida Studio Theatre ===
Directed by Bruco Jordan. The premiere had 10 April. Review: .

- Rachel - Faith Sandberg
- Bill - Graham Stuart Allen
- Judy - Jenny Strassburg
- Tom - Daryl Embry
- Julie - Kate Siepert
- Daphne - Lisa McMillan

=== Gadahad (RBC) Theatre, USA ===
Showtime: Tuesday, 5 July 2016 - Thursday, 7 July 2016.

=== Domino Theatre, USA ===
Playing at the Baby Grand, 218 Princess St., until 20 Dec. with performances from Thursday to Saturday at 8 p. m.

- Rachel - Jacqueline Cyr
- Bill - Kevin Fox
- Judy - Keri McPhail
- Tom - Ilke Hincer
- Julie - Maria Nativida
- Daphne - Jane Baldock

Judy -Keri McPhail Tom -Ilke Hincer Julie -Maria NatividadDaphne -Jane Baldock

=== Actors Theatre of Indiana ===
Directed by Judy Fitzgerald. "Perfect Wedding" closed on Sunday, 21 September 2008, but Actors’ Theatre of Indiana is having "An Evening to Remember" on 22 November 2008 at the Oak Hill Mansion in Carmel as its annual fundraiser.

- Bill - Don Farrell
- Judy - Christa Shoot
- Rachel - Jamison Kay Garrison
- Tom - Bradley Reynolds
- Julie - Cynthia Collins
- Daphne - Julie Dixon
- Dupont - Tobin Strader

=== Vital Theater Company, New York City, New York, USA ===
Directed by Teresa K. Pond. Preview 8 July 2009 and opened 12 July 2009. Closing date 2 August 2009.

- Bill ... Matt Johnson
- Rachel ... Amber Bela Muse
- Judy ... Kristi McCarson
- Tom ... Fabio Pires

=== Northcoast Repertory Theatre, USA ===
- Rachel - Amanda Schaar
- Bill - Christopher M. Williams
- Julie - Kelly McCue
- Tom - Jason Maddy
- Judy - Brenda Dodge
- Daphne - Linda Van Zandt

=== arzi theater founded by Sami Levy, Israel ===
Directed by Ido Rozenberg. "A Perfect Wedding" (“hatuna mushlemet” in hebrew) opened on Friday, August 23, 2024, at the Eretz Israel Museum in Tel Aviv in the Kalchkin Auditorium.

- Bill - Nadir Eldad/Gil Ari Cohen
- Judy - Hagar Engel/Belle Vanunu
- Rachel - Meshi Kleinstein
- Tom - Aviram Avitan/Refael Abbas
- Julie - Talli Oren
- Daphne - Yael Amit
