= Skeet (film) =

- Directed by: Nik Sexton
- Written by: Nik Sexton
- Produced by: Mary Sexton
- Starring: Sean Dalton; Jay Abdo
- Cinematography: Nigel Markham
- Edited by: Kirk Ramsay; Aaron Van Domelen
- Music by: Andrew Staniland
- Production company: Rink Rat Productions
- Distributed by: Rink Rat Productions
- Release date: September 14, 2024 (AIFF)
- Running time: 104 minutes
- Country: Canada
- Languages: English; Arabic

Skeet is a 2024 Canadian drama film written and directed by Nik Sexton. The film stars Sean Dalton as Billy Skinner, a stereotypical Newfoundland skeet from St. John's who is trying to make a fresh start after a stint in prison. He befriends Mohamed (Jay Abdo), a recent refugee from the Syrian civil war who is learning to adapt to Newfoundland society. The film received nominations at the 2024 Atlantic International Film Festival and the 13th Canadian Screen Awards.

== Cast ==
- Sean Dalton as Billy Skinner, the eponymous "skeet" who seeks to turn his life around after three years in prison
- Jay Abdo as Mohamed, a Syrian refugee who becomes Billy's close friend
- Kate Corbett as Leah Locke, one of Billy's neighbours
- Sean Panting as Jim Rossiter, a social care worker
- Lawrence Barry as Frank, one of Billy's neighbours
- Terry Ryan as Gus, one of Billy's neighbours
- Garth Sexton as Leo, the leader of a local crime ring
- Fadia Afashe as Fatima, Mohamed's wife
- Mahmoud Thome as Hamza, Mohamed and Fatima's son
- Wendi Smallwood as Mae, Billy's mother
- Jackson Petten as Brandon, Billy's son
- Steve O'Connell as Tony, the manager of a chicken plant
- Carter Churchill as Timmy
- Patrick Dempsey as Eddie
- Darryl Hopkins as Gerard
- Alexis Koetting as a social worker
- Gina Squires as Shelley

== Production ==
Sexton stated that the film was initially set out to be "a really dark [...] Newfoundland noir film," but the plot significantly changed when he met some refugees in a low-income housing area while location scouting. As the film focuses on the experiences of a refugee in St. John's, Syrian Newfoundlander Eyad Sakkar was hired a story consultant; he had suggested that Abdo take on the role of Mohamed.

The film was shot in 2023. While in Canada working on the film, Abdo spoke of the urgent need for international aid following the 2023 Turkey–Syria earthquakes.

== Distribution ==
The film was screened for distributors in the Industry Selects program at the 2024 Toronto International Film Festival. It had its public premiere at the 2024 Atlantic International Film Festival (AIFF).

== Awards ==
At AIFF, Dalton won the award for Outstanding Performance, alongside Mary-Colin Chisholm in the short film The Kitchen Sink, and Nigel Markham won the award for Best Atlantic Canadian Cinematography.

The film won the People's Pick award at the 2025 Canadian Film Festival.

Dalton received a Canadian Screen Award nomination for Best Lead Performance in a Drama Film at the 13th Canadian Screen Awards in 2025.
