= Nik Sexton =

Canadian film director (born 1980)

- Born: Nicholas Carlo Herbert Sexton; March 1980 (age 46)
- Occupation: Director
- Years active: 2012–present
- Notable work: How to Be Deadly; Skeet

Nikolas Carlo Herbert Sexton (born March 1980) is a Canadian film and television director from Newfoundland and Labrador. His debut feature film How to Be Deadly was released in 2014.

== Comedy ==
The son of producer Mary Sexton and the nephew of Tommy Sexton, Sexton began his career making short comedy videos for YouTube about "Donnie Dumphy", a skateboarder who would become the central character in How to Be Deadly. In 2012, he released a short film version of How to Be Deadly, before entering production on the feature version in 2013. The film won the Canadian Comedy Award for Best Feature Film at the 16th Canadian Comedy Awards in 2015, and Sexton was also nominated for Best Direction in a Feature Film.

== Film production ==
Sexton subsequently worked principally in television, with direction and production credits on Rick Mercer Report, This Hour Has 22 Minutes and Good People. With Mark Sakamoto and Tom Stanley, he was a Canadian Screen Award nominee for Best Writing in a Factual Program or Series at the 9th Canadian Screen Awards in 2021 for Good People.

In 2021 Sexton and his mother collaborated on Me, Mom & Covid, a documentary film about Mary's mother and Nik's grandmother Sara Sexton, which centred on Sara's death of COVID-19 after having devoted her life to the care of her mentally disabled daughter Edwina and to HIV/AIDS activism following Tommy's death in 1993.

His second feature film, Skeet, premiered at the 2024 Atlantic International Film Festival.
