= Sean Dalton (musician) =

Canadian musician and actor (born 1980)

- Born: Sean Patrick Dalton; May 14, 1980 (age 46); St. John's, Newfoundland, Canada
- Education: St. Francis Xavier University
- Occupations: Drummer, actor
- Known for: The Trews, Skeet

Sean Patrick Dalton (born May 14, 1980) is a Canadian musician and actor. He is best known as the former drummer for rock band The Trews.

== Musical career ==
Born and raised in St. John's, Newfoundland, Dalton moved to Antigonish, Nova Scotia, to study music at St. Francis Xavier University, where he joined the Trews in 2001 following the departure of Ramsey Clark; he is the cousin of Colin and John-Angus Macdonald, the band's singer and guitarist.

Dalton appeared on all of the band's albums up to and including 2014's The Trews. In 2015, he announced his departure from the band, citing the effects of the touring and partying lifestyle on his physical health. He subsequently moved back to Antigonish, where he set up his own music school offering private drum lessons.

== Acting career ==
In 2014, Dalton took on his first acting role with a small supporting appearance in Nik Sexton's comedy film How to Be Deadly.

In 2024, Dalton had his first leading role as the title character in Sexton's film Skeet. He won the Joan Orenstein & David Renton Award for Outstanding Performance in Acting at the 2024 Atlantic International Film Festival, and received a Canadian Screen Award nomination for Best Lead Performance in a Drama Film at the 13th Canadian Screen Awards in 2025.
