= Newfoundland and Labrador in fiction =

Newfoundland and Labrador has been written about by many writers.

== Newfoundland ==
=== Literature ===
- Small Game Hunting at the Local Coward Gun Club (2019) by Megan Gail Coles
- River Thieves (2001), Galore (2009), Sweetland (2014), The Innocents (2019), The Adversary (2023) and others by Michael Crummey
- The Corrigan Women (1988) by M. T. Dohaney
- The Eyes of the Gull (1936) and others by Margaret Duley
- Come, Thou Tortoise (2009) by Jessica Grant
- Blackstrap Hawco (2008) by Kenneth J. Harvey
- Down to the Dirt (2005), We'll All Be Burnt in Our Beds Some Night (2017) and others by Joel Thomas Hynes
- House of Hate (1970) by Percy Janes
- The Colony of Unrequited Dreams (1998), The Navigator of New York (2002) and others by Wayne Johnston
- Gaff Topsails (1996) by Patrick Kavanagh
- Alligator (2005), February (2009), Caught (2013) and others by Lisa Moore
- Random Passage (1992), Waiting for Time (1994) and Cloud of Bone (2007) by Bernice Morgan
- The Boat Who Wouldn't Float (1969) by Farley Mowat
- The Shipping News (1993) by Annie Proulx
- Rare Birds (2001) and The Nine Planets (2004) by Edward Riche
- Annabel (2010) by Kathleen Winter
- This All Happened (2000), The Big Why (2004) and others by Michael Winter

==== In other languages ====
- Een landingspoging op Newfoundland (1957) by Willem Frederik Hermans. "An Attempt to Land in Newfoundland", a book of short stories in Dutch.
- Vi, de druknede (2006) by Carsten Jensen. "We, the Drowned" includes a voyage, in the 1920s, by a Danish sailing schooner, from Iceland to the Dominion of Newfoundland to collect salt fish for Portugal from an outport.

==== Short mentions ====
- The Mayor of Casterbridge (1886) by Thomas Hardy. There is mention of a character being lost off the coast of Newfoundland.
- Isle of Demons, a Catalan legend about a voyage to Newfoundland.

=== Film ===
- The Adventure of Faustus Bidgood
- Bayo
- Black Conflux
- Cast No Shadow
- Crown and Anchor
- The Divine Ryans
- Down to the Dirt
- Extraordinary Visitor
- The Grand Seduction
- Hunting Pignut
- John and the Missus
- The King Tide
- Rare Birds
- Riverhead
- The Rowdyman
- Secret Nation
- The Shipping News
- Sweetland
- Violet

=== Radio ===
- Tales from Pigeon Inlet as told by Uncle Mose, played by Ted Russell and set in the fictional outport of Pigeon Inlet was a very popular and comedic radio broadcast in Newfoundland which later spurred a TV show.
- The Great Eastern was a comedy series on CBC Radio, presented in the format of a radio news magazine series produced by the Broadcasting Corporation of Newfoundland.

=== Theatre ===
- Come from Away
- Jacob's Wake by Michael Cook
- West Moon by Al Pittman

=== Television ===
- CODCO
- Dooley Gardens
- Gullage's
- Hatching, Matching and Dispatching
- Little Dog
- Rabbittown
- Republic of Doyle
- Total Drama World Tour

== Labrador ==
=== Literature ===
- Labrador (1988) by Kathryn Davis. Despite the title most of the action takes place in the United States.
- Woman of Labrador (1973) by Elizabeth Goudie
- Tales of the Labrador (1916) by Wilfred Grenfell
- White Eskimo: A Novel of Labrador (1972) by Harold Horwood
- The Land God Gave to Cain (1958) by Hammond Innes
- The Long Crossing and Other Labrador Stories (1992) by Elliott Merrick
- Williwaw (1978) by Phyllis S. Moore. A novel about the struggle of Labrador for independence.
- The Afterlife of George Cartwright (1992) by John Steffler
- The Lure of the Labrador Wild (1905) by Dillon Wallace
- The Chrysalids (1955) by John Wyndham

==== In other languages ====
- Fortællinger fra Labrador (1923) by Aksel Sandemose. "Tales from Labrador".

== See also ==
- List of writers from Newfoundland and Labrador
