= 27th Torino Film Festival =

The 27th Torino Film Festival was held 13 November – 21 November 2009 in Turin, Italy and was directed by Gianni Amelio, in his first year as director of the festival.

== Films in competition ==
- Chi L'Ha Visto (Claudia Rorarius)
- Children Metal Divers (Ralston Jover)
- Crackie (Sherry White)
- Get Low (Aaron Schneider)
- Guy and Madeline on a Park Bench (Damien Chazelle)
- Jalainur (Zhao Ye)
- The King of Escape (Alain Guiraudie)
- The Maid (Sebastián Silva)
- Medal of Honor (Călin Peter Netzer)
- The Mouth of the Wolf (Pietro Marcello)
- North (Rune Denstad Langlo)
- Santina (Gioberto Pignatelli)
- Torso (Yutaka Yamazaki)
- Transmission (Roland Vranik)
- Van Diemen's Land (Jonathan auf der Heide)
- You Won't Miss Me (Ry Russo-Young)

== Awards ==
- Prize of the City of Torino:
  - The Mouth of the Wolf (Pietro Marcello)
- Jury Special Prize:
  - Crackie (Sherry White)
- Special Mention:
  - Victor Rebengiuc (Medal of Honor)
- Best Female Performance:
  - Catalina Saavedra (The Maid)
- Cipputi Award:
  - Children Metal Divers (Ralston Jover)
- Holden Award for the Best Script:
  - Călin Peter Netzer (Medal of Honor)
- Audience Award:
  - Medal of Honor (Călin Peter Netzer)
- FIPRESCI Prize:
  - The Mouth of the Wolf (Pietro Marcello)
