= Percy Hynes White =

Canadian actor (born 2001)

- Hynes White in 2023
- Born: October 8, 2001 (age 25); St. John's, Newfoundland and Labrador, Canada
- Occupation: Actor
- Years active: 2008–present
- Parents: Joel Thomas Hynes (father); Sherry White (mother)

Percy Hynes White (born October 8, 2001) is a Canadian actor. Known for his work in independent films and on television, he started acting in short films from the age of two before progressing to roles in feature films and on television, and later pursuing more mature roles in independent media.

As a child actor, Hynes White gained wider recognition for starring in the fantasy comedy Night at the Museum: Secret of the Tomb (2014), a box office hit, and psychological thriller Edge of Winter (2016). His career progressed with roles on television, including in the Marvel series The Gifted (2017–2019) and as Xavier Thorpe in the first season of the Netflix comedy horror series Wednesday (2022).

Transitioning to more mature roles, Hynes White played supporting role in the comedy drama I Like Movies (2022) and in Megan Park's acclaimed coming of age fantasy My Old Ass (2024).

== Early life and education ==
Hynes White was born on October 8, 2001, in St. John’s, Newfoundland and Labrador, to writer, actor, and musician Joel Thomas Hynes and screenwriter, director and producer Sherry White.

He described his childhood self as being "a creative kid". He attributes his parents with providing him with a nurturing environment that encouraged creativity and self-expression from an early age.

With Hynes White’s childhood within the world of acting and filmmaking, he went on to attend a two-year theatre program, The Performing Arts Group, in his hometown of St. John's.

== Career ==
=== 2008–2016: Early acting roles and career beginnings ===
Hynes White has been acting since the age of 2, beginning with performances in short films in and around his hometown of St. John's, Newfoundland. At age 2, he starred as baby Morgan Lombard in Moera: Fact or Fantasy? alongside his mother.

Hynes White made his screen debut at the age of 7, playing six year old Keith in the 2008 Canadian film, Down to the Dirt, based upon his father’s first novel of the same name.

At age 9, he played the lead in the short film Forty-Five and Five and soon was chosen for leading roles in other short films, including Winners and Little Man.

Hynes White's television debut was in 2013, where he played Joey Crocker in The Slattery Street Crockers.

In 2013, Hynes White was featured in The Grand Seduction alongside Brendan Gleeson, which premiered at the 2013 Toronto International Film Festival. The following year in 2014, Hynes White was featured in Cast No Shadow, which won best film, director and screenplay awards at the Atlantic Film Festival awards, and Hynes White's win for best actor. In the same year, he starred opposite of Ben Stiller and Ricky Gervais in the 2014 American fantasy film, Night at the Museum: Secret of the Tomb as young Cecil "CJ" Fredericks.

In 2016, Hynes White starred in the psychological thriller Edge of Winter opposite Tom Holland and Joel Kinnaman. That same year, he was cast alongside Donald Sutherland and Michelle Rodriguez in the Canadian family-drama Milton's Secret.

=== 2016–2020: Rise in television and breakout role ===
From 2016 through early 2020, Hynes White appeared in a handful of television series consecutively while also appearing in films, including a role on Jordan Peele's reboot of the cult classic The Twilight Zone for CBS All Access, making an appearance on Canadian medical drama Transplant for NBC Universal, appearing for two seasons on Between for Netflix, and appearing in the limited series 11.22.63 for Hulu starring James Franco.

In 2017, Hynes White's breakout role was starring as mutant Andy Strucker in The Gifted, an X-Men spin-off series, opposite Stephen Moyer, Amy Acker, and Natalie Alyn Lind. The show ran for two seasons on Fox before being cancelled in 2019.

=== 2021–2025: Pretty Hard Cases, Wednesday and return to film roles ===
From 2021 to 2023, Hynes White was a lead series regular in the CBC comedy Pretty Hard Cases, in which he appears as Elliot Wazowski, starring opposite Meredith MacNeill, Adrienne C. Moore and Katie Douglas.

In 2022, Hynes White played a supporting lead in I Like Movies, which premiered at the 47th annual Toronto International Film Festival in September and earned himself a Best Supporting Actor Award from the Vancouver Film Critics Circle.

Concurrently, it was announced that he would be cast in the series Wednesday, produced by Tim Burton for Netflix. He played the role of Xavier Thorpe, a charismatic and supernaturally artistic Nevermore Academy student, who comes from wealth thanks to his celebrity psychic father and the potential love interest to Wednesday Addams. The actor's option for the second season of the show was not picked up. It was rumored this was due to anonymous sexual assault allegations on Twitter, which Hynes White denied, calling it a "campaign of misinformation". Netflix declined to comment on Hynes White's removal from the cast list.

Post-Wednesday premiere, in late 2022, Hynes White played a supporting lead role as "Chad" in director Megan Park’s My Old Ass for Margot Robbie's production company LuckyChap Entertainment alongside Maisy Stella, Aubrey Plaza and Maddie Ziegler. In an interview with director Megan Park, Park described that Hynes White had sent in a self-tape of himself that was "genius" and that he "understood the humor", saying "it was so Chad." His performance earned him another nomination from the Vancouver Film Critics Circle for Best Supporting Actor.

In the same year, Hynes White was cast as the lead role alongside Wednesday costar Jenna Ortega in writer Tiffany Paulsen's directorial debut romantic drama film, Winter Spring Summer or Fall. In an interview with director Tiffany Paulsen, Paulsen states that his performance in Winter Spring Summer or Fall was "absolutely magical".

Hynes White guest appeared in the second season of CBC's paranormal thriller series Ghosting with Luke Hutchie and Matthew Finlan, which premiered on March 21 2025. Hynes White stepped into the dark with Hutchie and Finlan to investigate the infamous haunting of Craigdarroch Castle in Victoria, British Columbia.

Additionally, Hynes White starred alongside Dafne Keen in the 2025 horror film Whistle directed by Corin Hardy.

=== 2026-current: Upcoming roles and continuation in film and television ===
Hynes White started his 2026 with a guest feature in Law & Order Toronto: Criminal Intent in the episode "WAGMI".

Hynes White’s confirmed upcoming films include the one-take thriller The Plan directed by Jessica Barr, a film adaptation of the play Armstrong’s War, and the on-the-run thriller Crime Novella directed by Omar de Soto.

== Personal life ==
As part of his preparation for his role on Wednesday, Hynes White learned a variety of new skills, including archery, painting, canoeing and fencing, as well as new dance moves.

Hynes White had long been a fan of Wednesday's executive producer, Tim Burton. His father used to read Burton's poetry to him when he was a child. When Hynes White's mother called to tell him he had landed the role of Xavier Thorpe on Wednesday, he thought it must be a joke, especially since the day was April 1. "I hung up and went back to sleep," he recalled later.

== Filmography ==
=== Film ===
Key
†	Denotes films that have not yet been released

Year	Title	Role	Notes	Ref
2003	Moera: Fact or Fantasy?	Morgan Lombard	Short film	
2004	I Dare Not Go		Short film	
2008	Down to the Dirt	Young Keith (age 6)		
2009	Crackie	Takeout boy		
2011	Forty-Five & Five	Barnaby	Short film	
2012	Winners	Max	Short film	
2013	Little Man	Boy	Short film	
2013	The Grand Seduction	Young Murray		
2014	Cast No Shadow	Jude Traynor		
2014	Night at the Museum: Secret of the Tomb	Young C.J. Fredericks		
2015	A Christmas Horror Story	Duncan		
2016	Rupture	Evan		
2016	Edge of Winter	Caleb Baker		
2016	Milton's Secret	Carter Crane		
2016	First Round Down	Matthew Tucker		
2017	Dust	Logan	Short film	
2018	At First Light	Oscar		
2018	Our House	Matt		
2018	Age of Summer	Minnesota		
2022	I Like Movies	Matt Macarchuck		
2023	Night For Night	Son	Short film	
2024	My Old Ass	Chad		
2024	Winter Spring Summer or Fall	Barnes Hawthorne		
2025	Sublet	Don	Short film	
2025	Oliver	Oliver	Short film	
2025	Whistle	Noah Haggerty		
2026	The Plan	Liam		
TBA	Armstrong’s War †	Michael Armstrong		
TBA	Crime Novella †	Cash	Post-production	

=== Television ===
Year	Title	Role	Notes
2013	The Slattery Street Crockers	Joey Crocker	Main role
2014	Rookie Blue	Daniel Hollot	Episode: "Everlasting"
2014–15	Murdoch Mysteries	Simon Brooks	8 episodes
2015–16	Odd Squad	Odie	3 episodes
2015	Defiance	Monguno Ksaruko	2 episodes
2015	Saving Hope	Aidan	Episode: "Shine a Light"
2015–16	Between	Harrison	7 episodes
2016	11.22.63	Randy	Episode: "The Kill Floor"
2017–19	The Gifted	Andy Strucker	Main role
2019	The Twilight Zone	Cole	Episode: "Not All Men"
2020	Transplant	Max	Episode: "Your Secrets Can Kill You"
2020	A Killer In My Home	Joshua	TV movie
2021–23	Pretty Hard Cases	Elliot Wazowski	Main role
2021	Nurses	Jesse	Episode: "Chaos Magnet"
2022	Wednesday	Xavier Thorpe	Main role (season 1)
2025	Ghosting with Luke Hutchie and Matthew Finlan	Himself	Special Guest Appearance
2026	Law & Order Toronto: Criminal Intent	River Smith	Episode: "WAGMI"

== Awards and nominations ==
Year	Award	Category	Nominated work	Result	Notes
2014	Atlantic Film Festival	Atlantic Canadian Award - Best Acting - Male	Cast No Shadow	Won	
2014	Edmonton International Film Festival	Rising Star Award - Actor	Cast No Shadow	Won	
2018	39th Young Artist Awards	Best Performance in a TV Series - Leading Teen Actor	The Gifted	Nominated	
2023	Vancouver Film Critics Circle	Best Supporting Male Actor in a Canadian Film	I Like Movies	Won	
2025	Vancouver Film Critics Circle	Best Supporting Male Actor in a Canadian Film	My Old Ass	Nominated	
