= Blueberry Grunt =

2025 Canadian drama film

- Directed by: Sherry White
- Written by: Sherry White
- Produced by: Sherry White; Ruth Lawrence
- Starring: Joel Thomas Hynes; Liisa Repo-Martell
- Cinematography: Stéphanie Weber Biron
- Edited by: James Patrick
- Music by: Duane Andrews
- Production company: Oversherry Productions
- Release date: September 11, 2025 (AIFF)
- Running time: 85 minutes
- Country: Canada
- Language: English

Blueberry Grunt is a Canadian drama film, directed by Sherry White and released in 2025. The film stars Joel Thomas Hynes and Liisa Repo-Martell as Harold and Vivian, a married couple whose relationship begins to unravel on a camping trip.

The film was shot in 2024, in Newfoundland and Labrador. At the 2024 St. John's International Women's Film Festival, White spoke about the film's production, noting that due to the province's film and television production boom, competition for film crew was much more intense than when she shot her debut feature Crackie in 2009.

The film premiered at the 2025 Atlantic International Film Festival, where White won the award for Best Atlantic Canadian Director.

The film was longlisted for the 2025 Jean-Marc Vallée DGC Discovery Award.
