= This Space for Rent =

- Starring: Dov Tiefenbach; Emily Hampshire; Rainbow Sun Francks; Kea Wong; Jason Bryden
- Country of origin: Canada

Production
- Running time: 45 minutes

Original release
- Network: CBC
- Release: January 4, 2006

This Space for Rent is a Canadian dramedy pilot which aired on CBC Television on January 4, 2006, as a television special. The show starred Dov Tiefenbach as Lucky Carroway, a recent university graduate and writer in Vancouver, British Columbia who finds that life after university is not as perfect as it might seem.

== Plot ==
The show begins shortly after his valedictorian speech, when his world comes crashing down after his first book is rejected by his literary agent. His life becomes worse as his nemesis becomes a published author who appears in "Vancouver Magazine's" top 10 writers list. He becomes a recluse who constantly wears his graduation robe (a reminder of his more successful times) and plays video games all day. However, he quickly recovers by writing a vicious 'letter to the editor' to Vancouver Magazine where he decries the selection of his nemesis as a top 10 writer. This letter angers so many readers of the magazine that they offer him a job as an anonymous "Hate Male" article writer.

He lives in downtown Vancouver in a flat with several friends. Emily Hampshire plays a recent law school graduate named Iona Goldenthal, a binge drinker (and perhaps an alcoholic) who must deal with the chauvinistic world of law. Rainbow Sun Francks plays a recent graduate named Barnaby Sharpe who majored in economics and Russian literature. He fails his first audition (a PSA for genital warts) and ends up working at a Jar Heads, a Starbucks parody, as a "coffee jerk". Kea Wong plays Rumour Wong, a medical intern and Lucky's girlfriend, who must deal with Lucky's mental breakdown and reclusive nature. Jason Bryden plays Elliot Hayden, a mutual gay friend who speaks Mandarin and frequents Chinatown. He teaches English to immigrant children and acts as a foil to the rest of the characters.

Like Lucky, Iona and Barnaby must deal with the problems in their burgeoning careers and achieve success by the end of the episode. Iona angrily (and drunkenly) declares that she cannot stand the chauvinistic nature of the law firm she works at while Burnaby angrily quits his job as a "coffee jerk" to audition for another part, which he lands.

== Production ==
This Space for Rent aired along with Cheap Draft and Rabbittown as part of "Comedy Week", a project to test the potential audience for the three shows as pilot episodes. The CBC had previously used the same strategy to launch the series Hatching, Matching and Dispatching and Getting Along Famously, although new programming chief Kirstine Layfield announced soon after joining the network that she was discontinuing the strategy. None of the three pilots was ultimately picked up to series.

Artists whose music was used in the pilot included The Tranzmitors, Caribou, Pink Mountaintops and The New Pornographers.
