= Williwaw (disambiguation) =

A williwaw is a type of coastal wind.

Williwaw may also refer to:

== Literature ==
- Williwaw (novel), a 1946 novel by Gore Vidal
- Williwaw, a 1978 novel about Labrador, Canada by Phyllis S. Moore
- Williwaw!, a 2000 children's book by Tom Bodett

== Places ==
- 5445 Williwaw, a minor planet
- Williwaw Rocks, near Joinville Island, Antarctica
- Mount Williwaw, a mountain in Alaska, US
- Williwaw Elementary, a school in the Anchorage School District, Alaska, US

== Maritime ==
- Williwaw, a Dragon-class sailboat helmed by George Friedrichs at the 1968 Summer Olympics
- Williwaw, a Belgian yacht sailed by Willy de Roos through the Northwest Passage in 1977
