= Seán Buckley =

Seán Buckley may refer to:

- Seán Buckley (politician) (died 1963), Irish politician
- Seán Buckley (hurler) (born 1938), Irish retired hurler
- Sean Buckley (entrepreneur), Australian entrepreneur, thoroughbred racehorse owner and investor
- Sean Buckley (producer), Canadian producer and director
