= Taylor Hickson =

Canadian actress (born 1997)

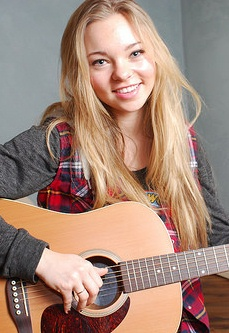
- Hickson in 2015
- Born: Taylor Delaney Hickson; 11 December 1997 (age 28); Kelowna, British Columbia, Canada
- Occupation: Actress
- Years active: 2015–present

Taylor Delaney Hickson (born 11 December 1997) is a Canadian actress raised in Kelowna, British Columbia.

Following a minor part in the movie Blackway, Hickson won a role in the 2016 feature Deadpool. In addition to several subsequent parts in films, she later starred in the television series Aftermath. Between 2020 and 2022, she starred as Raelle Collar in the Freeform series Motherland: Fort Salem.

== Early life ==
Taylor Hickson was born in Kelowna, British Columbia, the oldest of four siblings. At age 11, she began singing folk tunes alongside her father at talent shows and soon developed an affection for guitar and piano. In a 2016 interview, Hickson discussed her fondness for performing music, noting, "you go to another place and you just can't find that adrenaline anywhere else."

== Career ==
In late 2014, Hickson caught the attention of a casting agent who was a friend of her aunt. Initially uninterested in acting, she was later convinced to meet the agent, who signed her the same day. Over the following weeks, Hickson drove several hours to and from her auditions for roles. In 2015, she won a silent part in the film Blackway as a troubled teenager.

Hickson's breakthrough role came in the 2016 action-comedy Deadpool, her first speaking part. She played Meghan Orlovsky, a girl whom the titular character assists. In an interview, Hickson noted that the scale of this movie, along with her speaking role, greatly increased her passion for acting. "I didn't really know how badly I wanted to work as an actor until Deadpool," she said. She further stated that prior to Deadpool, "I thought [acting] might just be a fun thing I did on the side. That was the thing that changed my life."

Hickson was then cast as Brianna Copeland, a headstrong teenager in the 2016 post-apocalyptic show Aftermath. She labelled Brianna "a dream role", citing similarities between herself and the character. "She's very outspoken, sarcastic, social. She's the combative version of me," she said. "We definitely share her impatience, her stubbornness and her temper. She might have a hardened exterior, but she loves with all she is. She loves hard and unconditionally, much like myself." She summed the character up as emotionally driven, impulsive, and fun.

While reviewing her work in the role, Contrast magazine called Hickson a "beautiful jewel of an actress". Pop Culture Now predicted that she would have a bright future in acting. TV Grapevine declared "Taylor Hickson may be young, but she has a talent well beyond her years."

Hickson also revealed that she bonded with co-stars Levi Meaden and Julia Sarah Stone, who played her siblings on Aftermath, which facilitated their work. "[Levi] really was my older brother and Julia really was my sister. We totally have a sibling dynamic on- and off-screen. It made everything so easy and smooth", she noted.

She won roles in subsequent films throughout 2016, including G.L.O.; Everything, Everything (2017); and Incident in a Ghost Land. Hickson played the lead role in the independent dramatic film Hunting Pignut, based on a true story about a girl searching for a man. She also stars in the 2017 feature Residue, in which she plays the daughter of a private investigator. Her work in the film Giant Little Ones earned her a nomination for Best Female Lead at the 2019 Leo Awards.

Hickson was cast as Petra, a goth hailing from a death cult, in the 2018 series Deadly Class. Hickson highlighted the positive working environment of the show. She was then cast as Raelle Collar, a lead character who is a conscripted witch in the 2020 supernatural drama show Motherland: Fort Salem. The show's second season premiered in 2021. On the role as Raelle, Hickson said that

I haven't been able to spend this much time with one character, one headspace. ... In film, it's one little facet of what the character is going through and one moment in life. It's pretty profound to spend this much time with one person, and she certainly feels like an extension of myself.

When reviewing Motherland: Fort Salem, The A.V. Club highlighted that "the true standout is Hickson, whose Raelle is flinty and raw and convincingly conflicted about her power and how she wants to use it". The Advocate commented that:

Motherland establishes its queer credentials early in the pilot episode when Raelle meets the mysterious and compelling Scylla [...]. The show's overt queerness and what appears to be an unbreakable bond between Raelle and Scylla made them one of the most shipped couples of the year in a series that is stylistically gorgeous and politically timely.

== Personal life ==
In a 2016 interview, Hickson noted that she had issues with self-esteem during her upbringing. "I think it's sad that I have to constantly remind myself that I'm beautiful. Everything around us influences our brains to forget. The poster at the bus stop, that Instagram selfie, the ad on TV," she said. "Self-love takes practice." She also revealed that performing had helped her gain more confidence in general. She grew up admiring director Tim Burton and novelist Nicholas Sparks.

In December 2016, while filming Ghostland, Hickson was told by director Pascal Laugier to bang her fists against a glass window and that it was safe to do so. The window then shattered and she fell on the glass, severely cutting the left side of her face. The wound required 70 stitches, which left her with permanent scarring. In 2018, Hickson sued the film's production company, Incident Productions, "seeking damages for lost income and future loss of income". In 2019, Incident Productions "pleaded guilty to failing to ensure the safety and welfare of a worker under the Workplace Safety and Health Act" and was fined $40,000 by the province of Manitoba for the incident. Hickson stated that the experience left her with "trust issues"; however, when working on the show Deadly Class, the show's "executive producer Adam Kane met with her before filming to assuage her concerns, telling her that they'd halt production immediately if she ever felt uncomfortable". On that show's working environment, Hickson said, "It just made me understand that people gave a shit. People actually do care. You have to find the right people to work with you, and you'll know when that is".

In a May 2020 interview conducted by fashion magazine Vanity Teen, Hickson discussed the influence of Tim Burton on her career.

== Filmography ==
=== Film ===
Year	Title	Role	Notes
2015	The Mary Alice Brandon File	Townsfolk #1	Short film
2015	Blackway	Meth-head girl	
2016	Deadpool	Meghan Orlovsky	
2016	Hunting Pignut	Bernice "Story" Kilfoy	
2017	Residue	Angelina Harding	
2017	Everything, Everything	Kayra Bright	
2018	Ghostland	Young Vera	Also known as Incident in a Ghostland
2018	Giant Little Ones	Natasha Kohl	
2024	Bad Genius	Grace	

=== Television ===
Year	Title	Role	Notes
2016	Aftermath	Brianna Copeland	Main role
2018–2019	Deadly Class	Petra	Recurring role
2020–2022	Motherland: Fort Salem	Raelle Collar	Main role
2025	Untamed	Summer	3 episodes
2025–2026	North of North	Alexis	Main role

== Awards and nominations ==
Year	Award	Category	Work	Result	Ref.
2016	Whistler Film Festival Award	Rising Star	Hunting Pignut	Won	
2017	Leo Awards	Best Lead Performance by a Female in a Motion Picture	Hunting Pignut	Nominated	
2019	Leo Awards	Best Lead Performance by a Female in a Motion Picture	Giant Little Ones	Nominated	
