= Pretty Hard Cases =

Canadian comedy-drama TV series (2021–2023)

- Genre: Police procedural; Crime drama; Dramedy
- Created by: Tassie Cameron; Sherry White
- Starring: Meredith MacNeill; Adrienne C. Moore; Karen Robinson; Tara Strong; Dean McDermott; Al Mukadam; Kim Coates; Percy Hynes White; Katie Douglas; Ronnie Rowe
- Country of origin: Canada
- Original language: English
- No. of seasons: 3
- No. of episodes: 32

Production
- Executive producers: Sherry White; Tassie Cameron; Amy Cameron; Alex Patrick
- Production locations: Toronto, Ontario, Canada
- Production companies: Cameron Pictures; CBC Studios; NBCUniversal International Studios

Original release
- Network: CBC Television (Canada); Amazon Freevee (United States)
- Release: February 3, 2021 – March 8, 2023

Pretty Hard Cases is a Canadian police procedural crime comedy-drama television series that premiered on CBC Television on February 3, 2021. Originally announced with the working title Lady Dicks, the series was created by Tassie Cameron and Sherry White. In March 2021, the series was renewed for a second season, which premiered on January 5, 2022. IMDb TV became official co-producer for the series' second season, with the second season released on IMDb TV on April 22, 2022. In June 2022, at CBC's upfronts announcement event, the show was renewed for a third season, with Amazon Freevee (the renamed IMDb TV) still committed and on board to co-fund, co-produce and broadcast in the United States. The third and final season premiered on January 4, 2023 on CBC and CBC Gem in Canada, and on November 29 on Freevee.

== Premise ==
The series follows two detectives in their early 40s: Sam Wazowski, an uptight and by-the-book guns and gangs detective, and Kelly Duff, a streetwise narcotics detective. Both are ambitious and accomplished in their own way, excelling at work while struggling with their personal lives. They drive one another crazy, but also appreciate each other's strengths, and somehow manage to work together.

== Cast ==
- Meredith MacNeill as Det. Sam Wazowski
- Adrienne C. Moore as Det. Kelly Duff
- Amanda Brugel as Det. Karina Duff
- Karen Robinson as Unit Commander/Superintendent Edwina Shanks
- Tara Strong as Tiggy Sullivan (season 1)
- Dean McDermott as Det. Barry Hamm (season 1)
- Al Mukadam as Det. Taai Nazeer
- Percy Hynes White as Elliot Wazowski
- Katie Douglas as Jackie Sullivan
- Ronnie Rowe as Rick Gray (season 1)
- Kim Coates as Bill Misiano (season 1)
- Tricia Black as Det. Tara Swallows
- Miguel Rivas as Det. Dustin Chase
- Daren A. Herbert as DS Nathan Greene
- Laura de Carteret as Marley Briggs
- Ben Bass as DS Brad Michaels (season 2)
- Charlotte Sullivan as Adeline French (season 2)
- Brendan Beiser as Det. Watts (seasons 2–3)
- Amanda Walsh as Ro Wells (season 3)
- Wendy Crewson as Unit Commander Gloria Ballard (season 3)
- Ellie Moon as Ash (season 3)

== Episodes ==
=== Series overview ===
Season	Episodes	Originally released	
Season	Episodes	First released	Last released
1	10	February 3, 2021	April 7, 2021
2	12	January 5, 2022	April 13, 2022
3	10	January 4, 2023	March 8, 2023

=== Season 1 (2021) ===
No. overall	No. in season	Title	Directed by	Written by	Original release date	Canada viewers (millions)
1	1	"Bananas"	David Wellington	Tassie Cameron & Sherry White	February 3, 2021	0.42
2	2	"Dealz"	Sherry White	Tassie Cameron	February 10, 2021	0.29
3	3	"Nuts"	Bosede Williams	Adriana Maggs	February 17, 2021	N/A
4	4	"Feathers"	David Wellington	Andrew De Angelis	February 24, 2021	N/A
5	5	"Kids"	Cory Bowles	Lisa Codrington	March 3, 2021	N/A
6	6	"Guns"	Jordan Canning	Jillian Locke	March 10, 2021	N/A
7	7	"Ritz"	Penelope Buitenhuis	Ley Lukins & Keavy Lynch	March 17, 2021	N/A
8	8	"Flowers"	Cory Bowles	Jennifer Irons & Ley Lukins	March 24, 2021	N/A
9	9	"Gliders"	Winnifred Jong	Jillian Locke & Jennifer Whalen	March 31, 2021	N/A
10	10	"Jellybeans"	Sherry White	Tassie Cameron & Sherry White	April 7, 2021	N/A

=== Season 2 (2022) ===
No. overall	No. in season	Title	Directed by	Written by	Original release date
11	1	"Pencil Skirts"	Jordan Canning	Sherry White	January 5, 2022
12	2	"Plastic Teeth"	Sherry White	Jillian Locke	January 12, 2022
13	3	"Dirty Laundry"	Samir Rehem	Tassie Cameron	January 19, 2022
14	4	"Dog Treats"	Mars Horodyski	Keavy Lynch	January 26, 2022
15	5	"Rubber Lining"	Cory Bowles	Tassie Cameron & Carina Samuels	February 23, 2022
16	6	"Life Jacket"	Grant Harvey	Chris Roberts	March 2, 2022
17	7	"Pigeon Party"	Madison Thomas	Seneca Aaron	March 9, 2022
18	8	"Bug Spray"	Weyni Mengesha	Tassie Cameron & Sherry White	March 16, 2022
19	9	"Crystal Ball"	John Stead	Jillian Locke & Maisie Jacobson	March 23, 2022
20	10	"Worm Drive"	Madison Thomas	Seneca Aaron & Keavy Lynch	March 30, 2022
21	11	"Chipped Nails"	Gail Harvey	Carina Samuels & Sherry White	April 6, 2022
22	12	"Ribbon Cutting"	Winnifred Jong	Tassie Cameron	April 13, 2022

=== Season 3 (2023) ===
No. overall	No. in season	Title	Directed by	Written by	Original release date
23	1	"Always a Bridesmaid"	John Fawcett	Tassie Cameron & Sherry White	January 4, 2023
24	2	"Ten Thousand Steps"	Sherry White	Jillian Locke	January 11, 2023
25	3	"Red Velvet Durag"	Kelly Fyffe-Marshall	Carina Samuels	January 18, 2023
26	4	"Bare Naked Ladies"	Gail Harvey	Sam Godfrey & Sherry White	January 25, 2023
27	5	"Fish Called David"	Katrina Saville	Tassie Cameron & Maisie Jacobson	February 1, 2023
28	6	"Spin Me Round"	Winnifred Jong	Robina Lord-Stafford	February 8, 2023
29	7	"Hot Pepper Jelly"	John Stead	Mazin Elsadig & Sherry White	February 15, 2023
30	8	"Badge Bitch Party"	Sudz Sutherland	Story by : Trey Anthony; Teleplay by : Tassie Cameron & Sherry White	February 22, 2023
31	9	"Right Hand Red"	Madison Thomas	Tassie Cameron	March 1, 2023
32	10	"Creatures of Habit"	Cory Bowles	Jillian Locke & Carina Samuels	March 8, 2023

== Production ==
=== Development ===
On February 11, 2020, CBC, along with NBCUniversal International Studios, announced that it had given the series, then titled Lady Dicks, a series order. It was also revealed that Tassie Cameron and Sherry White would act as co-showrunners with David Wellington would direct the first episode. The launch of production was delayed by the COVID-19 pandemic in Canada; during the summer, further, the racial protests associated with the murder of George Floyd in the United States and the death of Regis Korchinski-Paquet in Canada led Cameron and White to rewrite some of their scripts.

=== Casting ===
On February 11, 2020, it was announced that the series would star Meredith MacNeill and Adrienne C. Moore. On September 8, 2020, CBC announced that Karen Robinson, Tara Strong, Dean McDermott, Al Mukadam, Percy Hynes White, Katie Douglas, and Ronnie Rowe would be joining the cast. In March 2022, it was announced that Ben Bass and Charlotte Sullivan had joined the cast in season 2.

=== Filming ===
Filming was set to begin in early spring, but was delayed by the COVID-19 pandemic in Canada. In September 2020, filming was underway in the Toronto area.

== International broadcast ==
In the United States, the series premiered on September 10, 2021, on IMDb TV. In the UK, the series premiered on 19 January 2022 on Alibi.
