= Florina Fernandes =

- Born: Florina Fernandes; Romania
- Occupations: Television presenter, news anchor, actress
- Notable work: ProFashion on Pro TV, Ştirile Pro TV de la ora 07:00 on Pro TV (together with Andreea Raicu)
- Children: 2

Florina Fernandes, nicknamed Fefe, is a retired Romanian television presenter, news anchor and actress. She is of African descent through her father. Fernandes was the first exotic appearance in the country show business, at least after the Romanian Revolution of 1989.

== Filmography ==
Film
Year	Title
2009	Medal of Honor
2005	La bloc
