= Aftermath (2016 TV series) =

Canadian drama television series

- Genre: Drama; Science fiction; Post-apocalyptic
- Created by: William Laurin; Glenn Davis
- Starring: James Tupper; Anne Heche; Levi Meaden; Taylor Hickson; Julia Sarah Stone
- Composers: Andrew Lockington & Michael White
- Countries of origin: United States; Canada
- Original language: English
- No. of seasons: 1
- No. of episodes: 13

Production
- Executive producers: Craig Merritt; William Laurin; Glenn Davis
- Producers: Suzanne Berger; Connie Dolphin
- Camera setup: Single-camera
- Production companies: NDG Productions; Bell Media; Universal Cable Productions; Halfire Entertainment

Original release
- Network: Space
- Release: September 27 – December 20, 2016

Aftermath is a Canadian science fiction drama television series. The first season, consisting of 13 episodes, aired initially in September 2016 on Syfy in the United States and on Space in Canada. On January 12, 2017, Syfy and Space canceled the show after one season.

== Plot ==
The series is centered on the Copeland family, a couple and their three young adult children, who struggle to survive as natural disasters, followed by the rise of supernatural beings, bring civilization to an end. The Copelands begin their journey in North Pasco, Washington and head towards Yakima in an RV, looking to survive such events as disastrous weather, unscrupulous humans, and supernatural freaks roaming the area.

== Cast and characters ==
=== Main ===
- James Tupper as Joshua Copeland, a world cultures professor who can analyze the changing world
- Anne Heche as Karen Copeland, Joshua's wife, a U.S. Air Force pilot with fighting skills
- Levi Meaden as Matt Copeland, Joshua & Karen's eldest son
- Taylor Hickson as Brianna Copeland, Joshua & Karen's first daughter and Dana's headstrong fraternal twin sister
- Julia Sarah Stone as Dana Copeland, Joshua & Karen's second daughter and Brianna's brainy fraternal twin sister

== Episodes ==
No.	Title	Directed by	Written by	Original release date	US viewers (millions)
1	"RVL 6768"	Jason Stone	Glenn Davis & William Laurin	September 27, 2016	0.63
After a major storm hits Washington, the Copeland family must contend with the beginning of the End of the World. A strange fever grips people while others are strangely possessed by malevolent spirits. Brianna gets abducted, causing the family to go out and find her. Brianna escapes and is picked up by infected police officers. The Copelands help a family in distress after witnessing a meteor crash. Brianna is rescued by bikers, who dispatch infected officers and offer a ride to Yakima. At the Yakima Quarantine Zone crossing, another meteor directly hits Yakima. Brianna and her family are separated once again.
2	"In Rats Alley"	Jason Stone	Philip Bedard & Larry Lalonde	October 4, 2016	0.76
Brianna gets a ride from a woman heading to Seattle. Karen and Joshua kill a skin-walker, a human possessed by a malevolent spirit. Brianna makes a call to her family to meet up in Seattle. The woman kills herself after realizing they are nearly out of gas. Karen helps out a man named Vince with extra gas. While walking to Seattle, Brianna meets another traveler, Tatiana, heading for Seattle. Karen gets a text from her Aunt Sally causing Karen to split up to go rescue her. While stopping at a rest area with Vince and his son Donny, Matt notices Donny's strange behavior and thinks he could be another "skin walker." After a freak lightning strike near some power-lines, Tatiana steals Brianna's phone. After meeting up with Sally, massive solar flare strikes the Copeland's RV. Brianna retrieves her cellphone at gunpoint, leaving Tatiana alone. Matt shoots Donny, only to learn from Vince that his son was schizophrenic and had run out of medication. Brianna witnesses a horse being taken away by a large dragon-like creature.
3	"In Our Empty Rooms"	Stefan Pleszczynski	Denis McGrath	October 11, 2016	0.66
The Copelands find Seattle abandoned, with everyone apparently disappeared. Brianna encounters a hostile group but is given a ride by two strangers, Devin and Mary. At Joshua's grandfather's house, Dana is attacked by her grandfather's dog, turned rabid. Karen and Joshua go to find rabies shots for Dana and find Dr Rawlins, from a previously infected town, who helps administer the drug. Joshua discovers disturbing video footage. Matt finds a woman, Ella, hiding in his grandfather's basement. At Devin and Mary's colony, Brianna encounters the same dragon-like creature from last night. On a supply run, the Copelands encounter looters, who take Dana hostage. Matt encounters a strange creature that attacks Ella. During a hostage trade, Joshua gets his daughter back, then poisons her abductors. Ella disappears after promising Matt "whatever he wants most in the world." The next day, Matt gets a call from Brianna. Back at the colony, Brianna's presence in the colony is met with superstition as the colony leader Reverend Brother returns.
4	"Fever of the Bone"	Stefan Pleszczynski	Adriana Maggs	October 18, 2016	0.60
Brianna's presence in the colony is met with continuing hostility. The Copelands discover dangerous leech-like creatures. In an interview with Rev. Brother, Brianna discovers that the Reverend is possessed by a highly intelligent Skinwalker, who locks Brianna in the barn. While repairing the RV at an Air Force base, Sally starts to show signs of some infection. Matt and Brianna encounter hostile militia. Brianna talks with Devin, hoping he'll help her escape. Back at the base, Dr Rawlins discovers Sally has been infected with the strange bugs from before. During a feverhead attack, Dr Roz sacrifices himself to lead the infected away from the Copelands. After an encounter with the Reverend, Devin frees Brianna. Sally stays at the base to help, while the family escapes. Brianna and Devin find her family, just as the Reverend finds them. Brianna kills him. As soon as they escape, the Family is attacked by Feverheads in a tank.
5	"A Clatter and a Chatter"	James Marshall	Glenn Davis & William Laurin	October 25, 2016	0.60
While escaping the Feverheads, the Copelands are saved by Booner, a friend of Karen. Sally and Officer Cottrell escape from base after the Feverheads overrun it. While on their way to Booner's Karen starts to hear a strange screaming, which Brianna thinks is a banshee. While searching the path, Dana is nearly devoured by a strange plant. Contrell becomes infected with fever, and asks Sally to end his life, she agrees only the condition she reach her family first. The man eating plant attacks the RV until Booner's people save them. While en route to Booner's, Cottrell's fever gets worse. At Booner's base, Karen hears and sees the Banshee crying again. Cottrell encounters a Feverhead with a Skinwalker possessing him, and gives Sally the gun telling her to warn Booner. At the base Sally reunites with her family. Contrell returns and is taken to sick bay, but is later possessed as well. While defending the compound, Booner gathers the Copelands to join the fight, revealing mines planted in the outskirts of his compound. The possessed Contrell kills Sally in front of Karen, leaving her devastated as her family tries to comfort her.
6	"Madame Sosostris"	James Marshall	Philip Bedard & Larry Lalonde	November 1, 2016	0.55
After Aunt Sally's funeral, Karen goes on a supply run while Joshua goes to Memphis Pacific College to retrieve a fellow professor's research. At Dana's old summer camp, 4 escaped prison women surround them. Matt and Karen try to outflank them. At Dr. Douglas's office, Joshua finds the professor, later turned out to be a Shapeshifter. After a run-in with another man-eating plant, Dana and her friend Martin are held hostage by a couple of prisoners. The plant takes one of the prisoner giving Dana and Martin time to escape. Joshua finds the resentful Dr. Douglas, whom despite her feelings about Joshua for ruining her career, decides to share what she knows, including that Mt. Rainier is about to erupt. Brianna looks after Devyn after a near suicide attempt. Matt and Karen captured by the remaining prisoners, but make a deal for half the supplies. When the tables turn, Karen asks on the whereabouts of her daughter to which the lead prisoners says they killed her. Karen kills the prisoners in cold blood, only to discover Dana has watched the whole spectacle in horror. Brianna is attacked by the Shapeshifter, only to be killed by Devyn with his bare hands. Douglas gives Joshua some computer cards with her research on the condition that Joshua kill her. He refuses but his escort Jane does, leaving Joshua with cryptic last words. Back at the Camp, Devyn reveals he has been possessed by a Skinwalker and in last act of freewill kills himself to save Brianna.
7	"What the Thunder Said"	Kaare Andrews	Sarah Larsen & Sean Alexander	November 8, 2016	0.52
The RV breaks down on the road just as soon as Mt. Rainier begins to erupt. While en route back to Booner's encounter a strange man named "Monk." After a sniper encounter, the mysterious Monk mysteriously dispatches with ambushes, but Joshua is wounded in the crossfire. While on road, Monk takes out the bullet from Joshua using psychic-like surgery. After finding the road destroyed, Monk suggests going back to the erupt Mt. Rainier may be a way to save the Copeland family. After being miraculously healed, Joshua suggest they trust Monk as Karen and Jane go with Monk up the mountain. The rest of the family heads to the avalanche shelters, and pick up 2 mountain climbers in the process. Karen and Jane follow Monk to the prayer wheel, but then Jane turns Karen's gun on her, want to go into the wheel first, shooting Monk in the process. At the shelter, the 2 Climbers take Dana hostage. Jane steps into the circle only to be sucked down into the earth by strange light. Martin is shot, causing Matt to nearly hang one of the Climbers. Joshua stops him only to let the Climbers flee, leaving them to the volcano to finish them off. Monk awakens and gives Karen a chance to come with him to his "next destination" but she refuses not wanting to give up on her family. At the shelter, the doors begin to shut Dana races out the door to find her mother. Karen ends up racing to find her family but then falls into a giant chasm as the mountain explodes.
8	"Here Is No Water but Only Rock"	Kaare Andrews	Denis McGrath	November 15, 2016	0.56
As the mountain continues to erupt Karen finds herself trapped in rocky chasm. Joshua leaves to find Dana, leaving Matt and Brianna in the shelter. While outside they encounter a Quetzalcoatl beast. While in the chasm, Karen finds a wounded Volcanologist whom she helps to get out of the cavern. Matt starts a fire to open the locked doors. Outside they find a dead Quetzalcoatl, having suffocated through the ash. While Brianna loses hope on finding their mother, Dana adamantly believes she is still alive. The volcanologist taunts Karen as she starts to see the ghosts of prisoners she killed. Karen has a series of visions, but ultimately accepts her fate as Diana finds her using a GPS location device she took with her. Reunited Karen explains her experience with the Monk. The family heads back home, only to find it destroyed. The Copelands depart to the East after Karen's visions make her realize that the Quetzalcoatl beast may be a harbinger of something bigger.
9	"The Barbarous King"	April Mullen	Adriana Maggs	November 22, 2016	0.54
On their way East, the Copelands discover a toll crossing run by none other than Karen's father, Ewan. While there Harry offers a momentary rest in the "honeymoon suite." At the same time Ewan offers Matt an opportunity to stay with him and help run things. Ewan sends Matt, Dana and Brianna to purchase ethanol from a local distributor. Joshua begins investigate Harry's operations with his tetracycline trade. Harry tries to convince Karen to let her family stay. Joshua finds out a dire secret and gets knocked out. At the bar, Dana and Brianna have a fight. Dana storms off so Brianna goes to find her. On her way, Brianna encounters a shapeshifter who takes her truck. Joshua wakes up to meet Ewan, realizing his operations are in jeopardy he intends to kill Joshua and make it look like an accident. Drugged Joshua manages to escape. The shapeshifter takes Brianna's form and then murders one of the bar patrons. Joshua hallucinates about his dad making a new discovery. Realizing there is a shapeshifter, the real Brianna gets into a fight with it. Dana kills the shapeshifter. The Copelands find their father and learn of Ewan's intentions, which cause them leave abruptly. On the road, Karen notices Joshua coughing up blood.
10	"Hieronymo's Mad Againe"	April Mullen	Vince Shiao	November 29, 2016	0.61
Karen, Dana and Brianna look for tetracycline for Joshua in a convalescent home run by a homicidal nurse. Joshua has a fever dream while Matt is supposed to be guarding him. Also a swarm of asteroids hit the Moon.
11	"Where the Dead Men Lost Their Bones"	Leslie Hope	Glenn Davis & William Lauren	December 6, 2016	0.50
While the Copelands continue their search for tetracycline in Idaho, we discover that everyone in Seattle was sucked up into the sky in a rapture-like event. Several come back in Idaho and Joshua bonds with a woman over the mantra he learned last episode "the one is many, but the many are one." Those that came back and some others get raptured again. Matt stops a young woman named Sarah from hanging herself who turns out to have tetracycline. She also helps free Brianna who has been kidnapped by Sarah's druggie ex-friends.
12	"Now That We Talk of Dying"	Leslie Hope	Philip Bedard & Larry Lalonde	December 13, 2016	0.51
Joshua is cured. Matt proclaims his love for Sarah. Dana lays our her time and space distortion theory. This is evidenced by Dana's and Brianna's rapid loves and losses, and also by several meetings with a soldier transported from 1972 Vietnam to the present. The Copelands intensify their search for Bob "Moondog" Black who Joshua is convinced can save them from the meteor swarm coming from the Moon. A homicidal federal agent and his partner are also after Moondog. They all meet at Moondog's transmission facility.
13	"Whispers of Immortality"	Mike Rohl	Glenn Davis & William Laurin	December 20, 2016	0.70
The Copelands finally meet up with Moondog and together they attempt to understand what is happening and try to stop the Earth from being destroyed by meteors. Karen may need to sacrifice herself. The series ends with a cliffhanger.

== Reception ==
The A.V. Club criticized the show for a lack of character development, noting that "the Copeland family—Washington residents who find themselves caught up in a world falling apart—barely seem to like each other, let alone have any serious family bond."
