= Rabbittown (film) =

Canadian television comedy film

- Genre: comedy
- Starring: Adriana Maggs; Sherry White
- Country of origin: Canada
- No. of episodes: 1

Production
- Executive producers: Adriana Maggs; Sherry White; Jennice Ripley

Original release
- Network: CBC
- Release: January 3, 2006

Rabbittown is a Canadian television comedy film, which aired on CBC Television on January 3, 2006. It aired alongside Cheap Draft, with This Space for Rent airing the following evening, as part of "Comedy Week", a project to test the potential audience for the three shows as pilot episodes.

The program starred Adriana Maggs as Louanne and Sherry White as Odelette, frenemies who work together at a hair salon in the Rabbittown neighbourhood of St. John's, Newfoundland and Labrador. The program's advertising tagline was "Happiness is being one step ahead of your best friend."

The cast also included Brenda Bazinet, Phil Churchill, Steve Cochrane, Blair Harvey, Joel Thomas Hynes, Andy Jones and Matt Lemche. Maggs and White were the writers and producers.

Rabbittown had the highest ratings of the three pilots, and was favourably reviewed by television critics, although none of the series was ultimately picked up. The CBC had previously used the same strategy to launch the series Hatching, Matching and Dispatching and Getting Along Famously, although new programming chief Kirstine Layfield announced soon after joining the network that she was discontinuing the strategy.
