= Winter Spring Summer or Fall =

2024 film by Tiffany Paulsen

- Release poster
- Directed by: Tiffany Paulsen
- Written by: Dan Schoffer
- Produced by: Josh Shader; Brad Krevoy; David M. Wulf
- Starring: Jenna Ortega; Percy Hynes White
- Cinematography: Graham Robbins
- Edited by: Simon Davidson
- Music by: Zac Rae
- Production companies: Motion Picture Corporation of America; Wall Fly
- Distributed by: Republic Pictures
- Release dates: June 6, 2024 (Tribeca Festival); April 25, 2025 (United States)
- Running time: 97 minutes
- Country: United States
- Language: English

Winter Spring Summer or Fall is a 2024 American romantic drama film directed by Tiffany Paulsen and written by Dan Schoffer. It is produced by Josh Shader of Wall Fly, Brad Krevoy of Motion Picture Corporation of America, and David M. Wulf. Starring Jenna Ortega and Percy Hynes White in leading roles, the story follows four segments in different seasons, showing two teenagers who unexpectedly fall in love over four days in a year, while figuring out their life's goals.

After about two years of development, filming took place in late-2022 in Salt Lake City, while the lead cast balanced production with their other commitments. Distributed by Republic Pictures, the film had its world premiere at the Tribeca Festival on June 6, 2024, and was released digitally on April 25, 2025. While some critics praised the film's love story, others disliked it by calling that it does not reflect the reality.

== Plot ==
One winter day, Barnes Hawthorne smokes marijuana with his friend P.J. and notices Remi Aguilar across the street. Later, while heading to a concert in New York, Barnes sees Remi again at the train station as she prepares to tour Columbia University. They strike up a conversation on the train about their future plans; Remi hopes to attend Harvard University and become a lawyer like her parents, while Barnes plans an aimless gap year. Remi suggests some other ways he can spend his time, such as volunteering with sea turtles or working for a music group, while Barnes shows her a Talking Heads playlist. When they reach their stop, Barnes asks Remi out on a date, but she is struck by a cyclist and needs stitches. At the hospital, Remi gently declines the date, explaining that he is not someone she wants to let into her life at the moment, and they part ways.

Months later, in the spring, Remi attends her senior prom with a friend, while Barnes goes with his ex-girlfriend. They unexpectedly reconnect after both of their dates ditch them. Remembering Barnes' playlist, they dance to "Burning Down the House," but when a slow song comes on, Barnes suggests they leave for sushi. After dinner, Barnes takes Remi to his house and, sensing her hesitation, reassures her that he does not expect anything physical. Barnes admits he only went to prom because he wanted to see Remi again, and he is considering volunteering with sea turtles in Costa Rica, inspired by her suggestion. Remi reminds him that she has to leave for Harvard in four months. Undeterred, the two kiss and decide to stay together for the summer.

On the Fourth of July, Remi and Barnes watch Remi's dad paint their house crimson in honor of Remi going to Harvard. Encouraged by Barnes, Remi tells her parents that she and Barnes plan on volunteering in Costa Rica together instead. Her parents react angrily, worried about her future, and ground her. Instead, Remi brushes them off and leaves with Barnes to celebrate the Fourth at a lake house. There, Remi crashes P.J.'s jeep while drunk driving and argues with Barnes that taking a gap year is not the right decision, ultimately ending their three-month-long relationship.

In the fall, Remi is attending Harvard and sees on Instagram that Barnes is in Boston, so she sends him a text. They catch up on campus and admit they miss each other, but agree that their breakup may have been for the best. Remi invites him to a Halloween party, but declines because he has a concert that night, as he is working as an assistant for a band. Encouraged by her friends, Remi crashes into the concert venue, confesses she still has feelings for Barnes, and asks if they can try again despite the challenges. Barnes gently declines, saying they are better off as friends. Remi respects his decision and leaves in tears.

Later, the band encourages Barnes to express his true feelings for Remi, after which he realizes his mistake in turning her down. The band helps Barnes by serenading Remi outside her dorm. Remi comes outside, surprised, and the two share unspoken glances before reuniting with a kiss.

== Cast ==
- Jenna Ortega as Remi Aguilar
- Percy Hynes White as Barnes Hawthorne
- Adam Rodriguez as Javier, Remi's father
- Marisol Nichols as Carmen, Remi's mother
- Elias Kacavas as P.J.
- Evangeline Barrosse as herself
- Jacqueline Emerson as Robyn
- Kate Rachesky as Wendy
- Larkin Bell as Saira
- Bridget Oberlin as Stevie, Barnes' mother
- Alexis Zollicoffer as Sheryl
- Kylee Anderson as Erica Morris

== Production ==
=== Development ===
After the release of Holidate in 2020, Tiffany Paulsen received an early version of the script by Dan Schoffer through the co-producer Josh Shader. They collaborated to finalize the script, taking inspiration from Richard Linklater's Before Sunrise, and titled the project Winter Spring Summer or Fall. Paulsen, originally a screenwriter, directed the film—her first, and described its theme as an "unexpected love". Brad Krevoy and David M. Wulf also joined as co-producers. Film critic Patrice Witherspoon described it as a "Gen Z Rom-Com" featuring an "unexpected love", such that it has the ability to "wreck" the plans of the "lives figured out".

=== Casting and filming ===
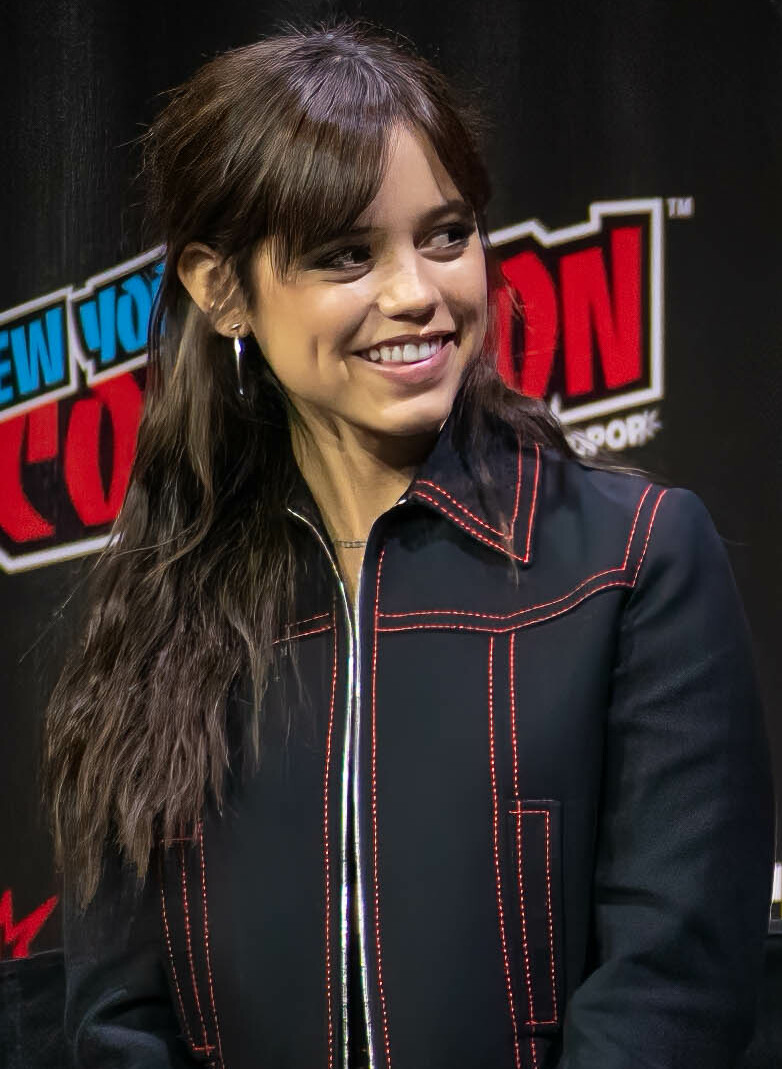
Ortega in 2022

White in 2023

The film's lead cast, who also starred in the Netflix series Wednesday in 2022.

Jenna Ortega was cast by Paulsen shortly before she began filming Wednesday in September 2021 or became known as "Gen Z's scream queen". (Note: Refer to Jenna Ortega, "Gen Z's scream queen") After about two years of pre-production, the principal photography began on Halloween 2022, in Salt Lake City, Utah, and Percy Hynes White joined Ortega as lead cast. The filming location also included the Stansbury Park.

Over the time, Motion Picture Corporation of America revealed to Deadline Hollywood that Adam Rodriguez and Marisol Nichols were signed as Ortega's character's parents. Before she had cast White, the director wanted Kacavas in lead role, but he instead chose to play a supporting role as a neighbor or friend. Evangeline Barrosse, an indie musician, was discovered and approached to perform her original songs in the film. Kendra Shay Clark, Helen Geier, and Jeff Johnson served as the casting directors.

The film is set in the East Coast of the United States and depicts one day each from four seasons; winter, spring, summer, and fall, so the set and the wardrobe had to be designed accordingly despite being filmed in winter, with limited sunny days. Gabriel Jessop and Alyson Hancey served as the production designer and costume designer respectively. Paulsen also took David Byrne's formal permission to use song "Burning Down the House".

The production was paused for three weeks so the lead cast could attend promotional events for their then-upcoming series Wednesday, which later became one of the most-watched series on Netflix. The director called their bond as "lightning in a bottle", and recalled Ortega to be the filmmakers' "first choice" and "dream team" despite having a tight schedule with availability of about an 11-day window. Reportedly, this was Ortega's first romantic role, and she also served as an executive producer. She expressed her primary choice to be horror films and not liking the romantic genres.

=== Post-production ===
After the filming wrapped up, the post-production phase started in January 2023, but the release was shelved. Graham Robbins served as the cinematographer, Simon Davidson as film editor, and Michael "Mike" Turner as the music supervisor. FrameRiver provided the visual effects services for the film. In March 2023, Republic Pictures partnered for the film release.

In January 2023, White was accused of sexual misconduct, which he denied. Paulsen defended his involvement in the film and did not want to recast his role. John Serba of Decider highlighted this as a possible reason of the film's delay, and noted Ortega's absence from "endowing" the film thus having "very little fanfare".

=== Music ===
External media

Audio
- Full album on iTunes

Video
- "What Are You Doing Later?" on YouTube

The soundtrack album was released by Lakeshore Records via music streaming services on April 25, 2025. It includes the film score by Zac Rae, and 4 songs by Evangeline including her "What Are You Doing Later?", "Will", and "Windansea".

== Release ==
The film premiered at the 23rd Tribeca Festival on June 6, 2024. It was released as premium video on demand by Paramount Pictures on April 25, 2025, and also had a limited theatrical release. On September 1, 2025, the film began streaming on platforms like Paramount+ and Amazon Prime.

== Reception ==
=== Critical response ===
On the review aggregator website Rotten Tomatoes, 31% of 16 critics' reviews are positive, with an average rating of 5.30/10. The Mirror US reported it as "Jenna Ortega's little-known film" which "received little to no buzz or build up".

Lovia Gyarkye praised the director while writing for The Hollywood Reporter, saying that she has an "intuitive sense" of making one blush by capturing close-ups of "the longing gazes" and "subtle touches" between the lead pair. Writing for Next Best Picture, Lauren LaMagna lauded it as a "unique coming-of-age story", which is both "heartwarming and heartbreaking" and "captures the essence of first love". Hayley Croke praised the performances of the lead actors in Loud and Clear Reviews, but noted that the rest of the film felt "lackluster" and had no "power to stun". Abe Friedtanzer of AwardsBuzz rated the film 7 out of 10, and noted its "strong performances" and "rich dialogue", regardless of its "unoriginality".

John Serba of Decider criticized the screenplay by calling it "more concept than story", and noted dialogue as "godawful" due to not sounding like "real human beings". For Paste, Jesse Hassenger reviewed it as "more than a little cheap-looking" movie, which is "full of heartfelt contrivances". Belen Edwards commented for Mashable that this "Wednesday reunion is anything but charming" as their "romance feels more like horror". Will Bjarnar commented for InSession Film that the film "is hardly ever convincing, let alone natural". Patrice Witherspoon called it "underwhelming and forgettable" in her online review. Martin Tsai noted the problems on Critic's Notebook and called it a movie "with extremely limited real-world experiences" and yet the filmmakers had "the audacity to premiere it at Tribeca for real New Yorkers". David Gonzalez of The Cinematic Reel called it a "disappointing" take into the ideology of "exploration of first love".

=== Accolades ===
At the 16th Hollywood Music in Media Awards, Mike Turner & Jonathan Lane were nominated for Best Music Supervision – Film.
