= Milton's Secret =

2016 film directed by Barnet Bain

- Theatrical release
- Directed by: Barnet Bain
- Written by: Barnet Bain (screenplay); Sara B. Cooper; Donald Martin; Eckhart Tolle (book)
- Based on: Milton's Secret: An Adventure of Discovery through Then, When, and The Power of Now by Eckhart Tolle
- Produced by: Sean Buckley; Fred Fuchs; Stephen Huszar; Ryan Lockwood
- Starring: Donald Sutherland; Mia Kirshner; Michelle Rodriguez
- Cinematography: Ray Dumas
- Edited by: Dev Singh
- Production companies: BUCK Productions; Hulo Films
- Distributed by: Momentum Pictures
- Release date: September 30, 2016
- Countries: Canada; United States
- Language: English

Milton's Secret is a 2016 Canadian family-drama film directed by Barnet Bain, based on the picture book of the same name by the author Eckhart Tolle, which was released in 2008. It stars Donald Sutherland, Michelle Rodriguez, Mia Kirshner, David Sutcliffe and William Ainscough as Milton. The film was released on September 30, 2016 in the United States.

== Cast ==
- Donald Sutherland as Grandpa Howard
- Michelle Rodriguez as Ms. Ferguson
- William Ainscough as Milton Adams
- Mia Kirshner as Jane Adams, Milton's mother
- David Sutcliffe as Bill Adams, Milton's father
- Ella Ballentine as Anna
- Hays Wellford as Tim
- Percy Hynes White as Carter
- Milo Larratt as Robbie

== Production ==
Donald Sutherland signed on to the cast on 23 July 2015. Peter Fonda was originally cast in the role of Grandpa Howard. On October 8, 2015, Michelle Rodriguez joined the cast, stating that she would star in a Canadian drama film, after the release of Furious 7. This was Donald Sutherland's first film in leading role in nearly a decade.

Filming locations included Vancouver, British Columbia; Hamilton and Brampton, Ontario, Canada. The film was partially financed via crowdfunding.

== Release ==
Momentum Pictures released the film. This is Sutherland's second project with Momentum, the first being a collaboration with his son, Kiefer Sutherland, the drama-Western, Forsaken. The first trailer and poster for the film was announced on August 8, 2016, with the tagline: "Be here. Now."

The film had its world premiere at the Vancouver International Film Festival on September 30, 2016.

== Reception ==
On Rotten Tomatoes the film has an approval rating of 38% based on reviews from 13 critics. On Metacritic the film has a score of 37% based on reviews from 6 critics, indicating "generally unfavorable reviews".

On IMDb, the film has a rating of 6 out of 10 stars based on 1,194 reviews (as of June 18, 2025).
