= Edge of Winter (film) =

- Theatrical release poster
- Directed by: Rob Connolly
- Written by: Rob Connolly; Kyle Mann
- Produced by: Kyle Mann; Jonathan Bronfman
- Starring: Joel Kinnaman; Percy Hynes White; Rossif Sutherland; Shiloh Fernandez; Tom Holland; Rachelle Lefevre
- Cinematography: Norm Li
- Edited by: Greg Ng
- Music by: Brooke Blair; Will Blair
- Production companies: Independent Edge Films; JoBro Productions; Drive Films; Tajj Media
- Distributed by: Vertical Entertainment
- Release dates: August 12, 2016 (United States); August 19, 2016 (Canada)
- Running time: 89 minutes
- Countries: Canada; United States
- Languages: English; French

Edge of Winter is a 2016 Canadian psychological thriller drama film directed by and written by Rob Connolly and Kyle Mann. It stars Joel Kinnaman, Tom Holland, and Percy Hynes White. The film centres on a recently divorced father, Elliot Baker (Kinnaman), whose angry behaviour slowly controls him while he resides with his two sons (Holland and White) at his cabin in the wilderness. The film was produced by Kyle Mann and Jonathan Bronfman. The film was released to mixed reviews.

== Plot ==
Divorcee Elliot Baker, who has just lost his job for punching his boss, jumps at the chance to spend time with his sons, teenager Bradley and younger Caleb. After their mother drops the boys off, they discover Elliot's shotgun in his bedroom. Elliot yells at them, but then apologises and decides it would be a good bonding experience to teach the boys about firearm safety. En route to Elliot's old lumber yard in the wilderness, Elliot discovers text messages on Brad's phone expressing displeasure with spending time with his father. Elliot hides the phone.

At the lumber yard, Elliot tells Brad to keep the gun close but Brad ignores him and the gun kicks back and knocks him to the ground. Brad gets half angry and half embarrassed, and stays in the car. Caleb becomes upset after killing a rabbit.

Preparing to leave, Brad is concerned about Elliot drinking and driving, so Elliot hands Brad the keys and teaches him how to drive. Caleb and Brad get into a fight, which results in the car sliding off the road and becoming stuck. They spend the night in the car, where Caleb tells Elliot about his step-father's promotion and their forthcoming move to London. Distraught, Elliot slams his hands repeatedly into the steering wheel, breaking his cast before falling asleep.

In the morning they head to a nearby hunting cabin to gather supplies, as they would freeze or starve attempting to reach the main road. Approaching the cabin, Brad falls through some ice. Elliot jumps in and yells for Caleb to get off the ice and start a fire in the cabin. Elliot covers Brad with blankets and puts Brad by the fire. After a while Elliot expresses his anger at losing his family when they move to London. Later in the night, the three are startled when two hunters, Richard and Luc, arrive also seeking shelter. Elliot is suspicious of the men, and demands they disarm before letting them inside.

Elliot is slowly losing his mind. He follows Richard to his truck, and attempts to stop him from contacting help, unintentionally killing Richard. When Luc arrives a little later, Elliot attempts to shoot him, but Luc escapes thanks to Brad and Caleb’s efforts. The boys return to the cabin, where Brad packs some supplies and convinces Caleb that they need to leave. Elliot goes searching for them and engages Brad in a fight after Brad makes a comment that Elliot is not a good dad. Caleb pleads with Elliot until he releases Brad. Elliot forces the boys to the cabin, locking them inside their room. Brad uses a nail to pry up a floor board, and Caleb goes under, seeing Richard's corpse under the house. Bradley tries to lift one more board for him to fit through but cannot, and tells Caleb to leave. Caleb finds Luc in his truck, and convinces Luc to take him to safety along with Brad. Brad finally pries up another board and starts a fire in the house in order to escape.

Elliot chases Brad through the woods, grabs him and states that the boys will never leave. Caleb appears and to calm him down tells Elliot that, if they stay, they could go fishing and hunting. As Elliot lets go of Bradley, Luc appears and attacks Elliot, but Elliot beats him to death. Brad and Caleb run to the truck and attempt to drive off. Elliot catches up with them and uses the rifle to break the window. As Brad manages to start driving, Elliot grabs on to Caleb. Bradley speeds up faster and Caleb kicks Elliot off. The two hold each other, tearfully, as they drive away into the night to seek help.

== Cast ==
- Joel Kinnaman as Elliot Baker
- Tom Holland as Bradley Baker
- Percy Hynes White as Caleb Baker
- Rossif Sutherland as Luc
- Shiloh Fernandez as Richard
- Rachelle Lefevre as Karen
- Shaun Benson as Ted
- Patrick Garrow as Gas Station Clerk

== Production ==
Filming took place in and around Sudbury, Ontario.

== Reception ==
The review aggregator website Rotten Tomatoes gives the film a score of 50%, based on 22 reviews, with an average rating of 5.2 out of 10. Metacritic also gave the film a score of 50% basing it on nine critics, indicating "mixed or average reviews."

Frank Scheck of The Hollywood Reporter was impressed by the performance of Kinnaman, Holland and Hynes White. He says: "[...] Kinnaman delivers a superb turn, especially in such scenes as when the boys tell their helpless father that they'll soon be moving to London with their mother and her new husband. Holland and White also are excellent as the boys who still love their father even while becoming ever more aware of his failings. Their quietly terrified reactions to his escalating belligerence are far more emotionally wrenching than the tired thriller genre conventions to which the film ultimately succumbs." Godfrey Cheshire of RogerEbert.com awarded the film with three out of four stars, stating that "A psychological thriller of a familiar sort, Rob Connolly’s “Edge of Winter” does have things to recommend it to adventurous viewers: a very suspenseful, atmospheric mounting and sharp acting by its small but expert cast.".
