= Duane Andrews =

Canadian guitarist (born 1972)

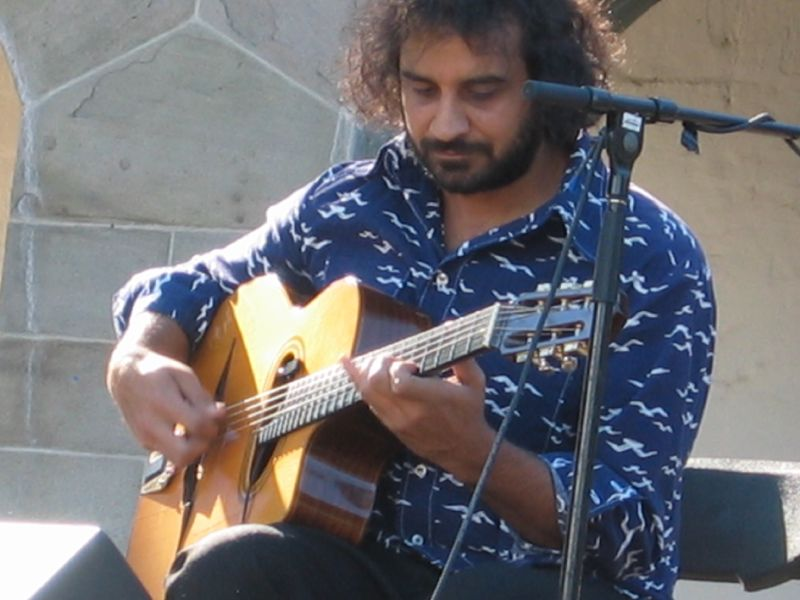
- Duane Andrews performing at the 2007 Harvest Jazz & Blues Festival

Background information
- Born: 1972 (age 53–54); Carbonear, Newfoundland and Labrador, Canada
- Genres: jazz, roots, instrumental
- Occupation: Musician
- Instrument: Guitar
- Website: duaneandrews.ca

Duane Andrews (born November 30, 1972, in Carbonear, Newfoundland and Labrador is a Canadian guitarist. He combines traditional Newfoundland folk music with jazz similar to the way that guitarist Django Reinhardt infused jazz with Manouche influences.

He is also a composer for film and television, with credits including the films Crackie, An Audience of Chairs and Blueberry Grunt.

== Biography ==
Born in Carbonear, Newfoundland and Labrador, Canada Andrews grew up exposed to the island’s mélange of cultural influences and his development as a guitarist reflects that. After graduating from the Jazz Studies program at St. Francis Xavier University with honours, Andrews spent several years studying contemporary music composition at the Conservatoire International de Paris and at the Conservatoire national de région in Marseille, France.

== Discography ==
- 2004: Self Titled
- 2006: Crocus
- 2008: Raindrops
- 2010: Dwayne Côté and Duane Andrews with Dwayne Cote
- 2012: The Empress with Dwayne Cote
- 2013: Charlie's Boogie with Craig Young
- 2015: Conception Bay
- 2015: More Sheep, Less Sleep with The Swinging Belles
- 2015: The Mallard Cottage Sessions with Aaron Collis
- 2016: Jingle Belles with The Swinging Belles
- 2016: Fretboard Journey with Fretboard Journey
- 2018: Christmas Picks with Fretboard Journey
- 2018: The Superstar Sibling Detective Agency with The Swinging Belles
