= We'll All Be Burnt in Our Beds Some Night =

2017 novel by Joel Thomas Hynes

- First edition
- Author: Joel Thomas Hynes
- Language: English
- Publisher: Harper Perennial
- Publication date: 2017

We'll All Be Burnt in Our Beds Some Night is a novel by Canadian writer Joel Thomas Hynes, published in 2017 by Harper Perennial. It won the Governor General's Award for English-language fiction at the 2017 Governor General's Awards and the Winterset Award, and was longlisted for the 2017 Scotiabank Giller Prize.

The novel centres on Johnny Keough, who is undertaking a road trip from his home in Newfoundland to British Columbia to scatter the ashes of his girlfriend Madonna after she is killed in an accident.
