= Medal of Honor (film) =

- Directed by: Călin Peter Netzer
- Starring: Victor Rebengiuc; Camelia Zorlescu
- Music by: Ramin Djawadi
- Release date: 14 November 2009 (TIFF)
- Running time: 104 minutes
- Countries: Romania; Germany
- Language: Romanian

Medal of Honor (Romanian: Medalia de onoare) is a 2009 Romanian drama film directed by Călin Peter Netzer.

The plot revolves around a retiree who is mistakenly awarded a military distinction. Former Romanian president Ion Iliescu plays himself in the film.

== Cast ==
- Victor Rebengiuc - Ion
- Camelia Zorlescu - Nina
- Mimi Branescu - Cornel
- Florina Fernandes - Rita - Cornel's wife
