= Little Dog (TV series) =

- Genre: Comedy drama
- Created by: Joel Thomas Hynes
- Starring: Joel Thomas Hynes; Ger Ryan; Katharine Isabelle; Dwain Murphy; Stephen Oates; Billy Cochrane; Andy Jones; Shauna MacDonald; Patricia Isaac; Julia Chan
- Composer: Erica Procunier
- Country of origin: Canada
- Original language: English
- No. of seasons: 2
- No. of episodes: 15

Production
- Executive producers: Tassie Cameron; Perry Zimel; Rob Blackie; John Vatcher; Amy Cameron; Alex Patrick; Joel Thomas Hynes; Sherry White
- Production location: St. John's, Newfoundland and Labrador
- Cinematography: Cabot McNenly
- Editors: Duncan Christie; John Nicholls
- Running time: 30 minutes
- Production companies: Elemental Pictures; Cameron Pictures

Original release
- Network: CBC Television
- Release: March 1, 2018 – March 7, 2019

Little Dog is a Canadian television comedy-drama series, which debuted on CBC Television on March 1, 2018. The series stars Joel Thomas Hynes as Tommy "Little Dog" Ross, a boxer who is offered the chance to redeem himself in a rematch against Rico "Havoc" St. George (Dwain Murphy), several years after forfeiting their first bout by walking away mid-match.

The series was inspired in part by Hynes' own experience as an amateur boxer, after he had to drop out of a planned match due to a rib fracture. The series is also available in the US on Pluto TV.

The cast also includes Ger Ryan, Katharine Isabelle, Andy Jones, Julia Chan, Patricia Isaac, Stephen Oates and Mary Walsh. The series was originally pitched to the CBC as a drama, but Hynes was convinced by producer Sherry White to retool it as a comedy.

== Cast and characters ==
=== Main ===
- Joel Thomas Hynes as Tommy "Little Dog" Ross, a washed up boxer on a quest for redemption
- Ger Ryan as Sylvia Ross, Tommy's mother
- Katharine Isabelle as Ginny Ross, Tommy's younger sister, a single parent who runs a self help seminar
- Dwain Murphy as Rico "Havoc" St. George, the professional Boxer who defeated Tommy in a big fight five years prior to the start of the series.
- Stephen Oates as Lowly Ross Jr., Tommy's brother
- Billy Cochrane as Chesley Ross, Ginny's son who is on a quest to find out who his father is
- Andy Jones as Lowly Ross Sr., Sylvia's ex-husband, a disgraced convict
- Shauna MacDonald as Tammy Mackie
- Patricia Isaac as Vaani Abdeen
- Julia Chan as Pamela, Tommy's ex-girlfriend

=== Recurring ===
- Michael Worthman as Jean-Pierre
- Ritche Perez as Big Tammy's Cameraman
- Mary Walsh as Tucker, a local fight promoter and crime lord
- Charlie Tomlinson as Sullivan Devereaux, the owner of a local fish plant

== Episodes ==
Season	Episodes	Originally released	
Season	Episodes	First released	Last released
1	7	March 1, 2018	April 5, 2018
2	8	January 17, 2019	March 7, 2019

=== Season 1 (2018) ===
No. overall	No. in season	Title	Directed by	Written by	Original release date
1	1	"Round One"	Sherry White	Joel Thomas Hynes	March 1, 2018
Tommy "Little Dog" Ross, a washed up boxer past his prime, gets challenged to a fight by an old rival.
2	2	"Round Two"	Sherry White	Joel Thomas Hynes	March 1, 2018
Tommy publicly accepts Rico's challenge, but he has his doubts. Tommy fights in a charity bout.
3	3	"Round Three"	Michelle Latimer	Joel Thomas Hynes	March 8, 2018
The day of the fight is getting closer and Tommy, in need of money for training, tries to get his old job back at Devereaux's Seafood Empire.
4	4	"Round Four"	Michelle Latimer	Joel Thomas Hynes	March 15, 2018
It's the day of the press conference. Tommy teams up with Tucker. Tommy's relationship with Vanni hits a snag.
5	5	"Round Five"	Molly McGlynn	Joel Thomas Hynes	March 22, 2018
Tommy, in prison for assaulting Vanni's ex-husband, gets bailed out. Rico deals with fallout from the press conference.
6	6	"Round Six"	Molly McGlynn	Joel Thomas Hynes	March 29, 2018
Tucker bets against Tommy and asks him to throw the fight. Tommy's father, Lowly Sr., is up for parole. Pamela tries to reconnect.
7	7	"Round Seven"	John Vatcher	Joel Thomas Hynes	April 5, 2018
It's the day of the fight. Lowly Sr. escapes from jail. Pamela drops a bomb shell. Rico and Tommy get in the ring.

=== Season 2 (2019) ===
No. overall	No. in season	Title	Directed by	Written by	Original release date
8	1	"Round Eight"	Sherry White	Joel Thomas Hynes	January 17, 2019
Tommy is on the run after winning the fight he was supposed to throw, Tucker is out money and the Ross family have lost their house in a bet against Tommy winning the fight.
9	2	"Round Nine"	Sherry White	Joel Thomas Hynes	January 24, 2019
Tommy get back together with Pamela and be a father for Cassius. Tucker is still out for revenge. Lowly Sr., who will be imminently paroled, wants to put the past behind him and go on the straight and narrow.
10	3	"Round Ten"	Wendy Morgan	Joel Thomas Hynes	January 31, 2019
Tommy lies and says that he has a promotional contract with the Smallwoods and will pay Tucker back, However Kevin Smallwood is interested and teams up with Tucker. Tommy fights in an impromptu exhibition boxing match which goes horribly wrong.
11	4	"Round Eleven"	Wendy Morgan	Joel Thomas Hynes	February 7, 2019
Despite the official cause of death being a heart attack, Tommy feels guilty about Big Turk's death in the ring, wanting to be a good role model for Cassius, he tries to make amends for Big Turk's death, which in the end only makes thing worse.
12	5	"Round Twelve"	Jordan Canning	Joel Thomas Hynes	February 14, 2019
After being defeated by Big Turk's son L'il Turk, Tommy takes on a string of sub-par opponents to boost his stats. Sylvia, in need of money, is planning on marrying the wealthy Devereaux, who claims to be terminally ill.
13	6	"Round Thirteen"	Jordan Canning	Joel Thomas Hynes	February 21, 2019
A few days after Sylvia marries Devereaux, the Ross family plans an intervention to try to split them up. Chesley goes to see Kevin Smallwood in wanting to get to know his "father" better.
14	7	"Round Fourteen"	Molly McGlynn	Joel Thomas Hynes	February 28, 2019
Tommy is heartbroken after learning Pamela lied to him about being Cassius's father. Chesley is devastated after learning that Devereaux is his real father. Tommy tries to back out of his upcoming fight with L'il Turk.
15	8	"Round Fifteen"	Molly McGlynn	Joel Thomas Hynes	March 7, 2019
Tommy says he will fight in an unexpected interview only to help hide what happened to Deveraux. The police interview the Ross family. Little dog and L'il Turk fight. Tommy decides to take control of his life and leaves.
