= Sherry White =

Canadian actor, writer and filmmaker

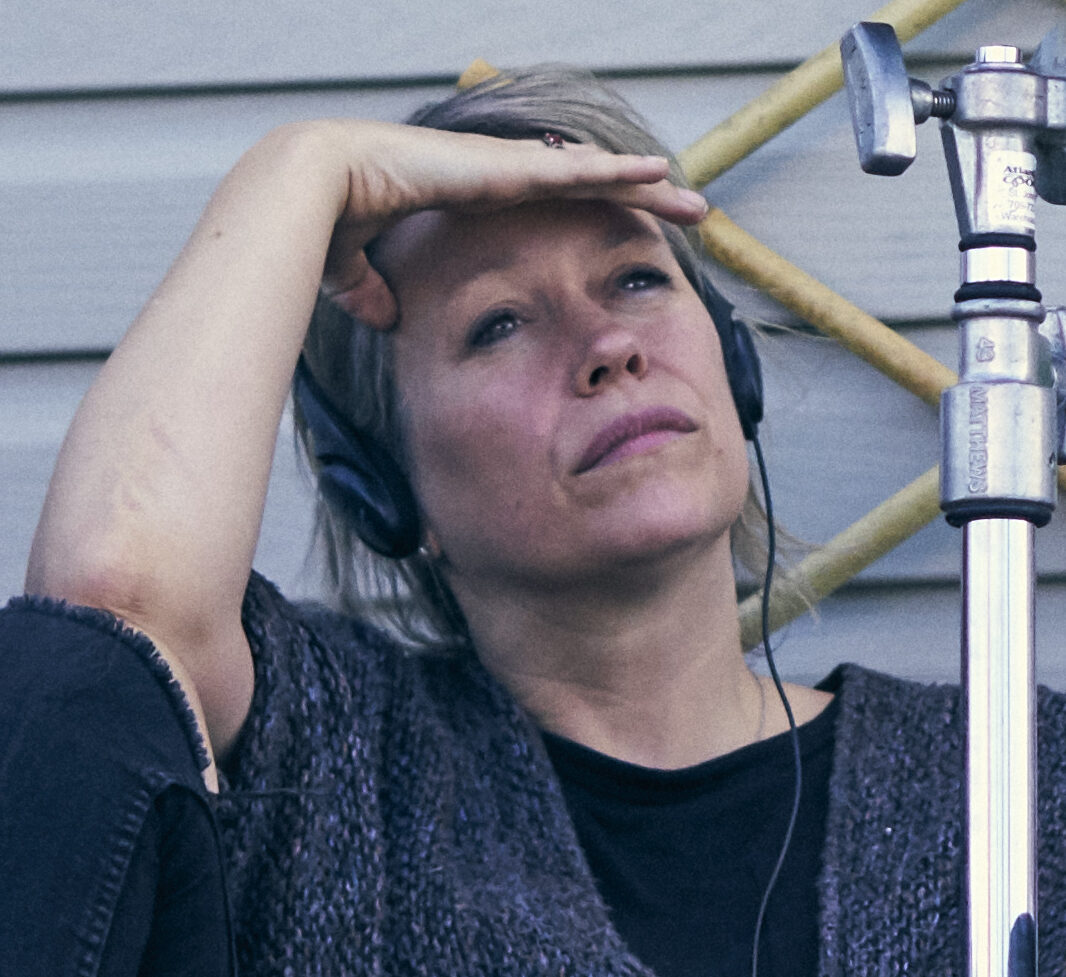
- White in 2017
- Born: Newfoundland and Labrador, Canada
- Occupations: Screenwriter, producer, actress
- Partner: Joel Thomas Hynes (2000-2008)
- Children: Percy Hynes White
- Writing career
- Years active: 1999–present
- Notable works: Crackie, Rabbittown, Rookie Blue, Maudie, Pretty Hard Cases, Little Dog, Orphan Black

Sherry White is a Canadian screenwriter, television producer, director, and actress. She is best known for co-creating and executive producing the CBC Television comedy-drama series Pretty Hard Cases, and for writing the 2016 film Maudie.

== Early life and education ==
Originally from Stephenville, Newfoundland and Labrador, White studied theatre at the Memorial University of Newfoundland's Grenfell College campus in Corner Brook, where Susan Kent, Adriana Maggs and Jonny Harris were among her classmates.

== Career ==
After screening her short films Diamonds in the Bucket and Spoiled at numerous festivals, White wrote and directed the Genie-nominated feature film Crackie, which premiered at the 34th annual Toronto International Film Festival. She then gained experience as a writer, producer, and showrunner on series such as the Shondaland crime drama The Catch, the police drama Rookie Blue, the Kyra Sedgwick-starring drama Ten Days in the Valley, and the CBC comedy-drama Little Dog, which earned her two nominations for the Directors Guild of Canada. White has also written and produced for Orphan Black, Burden of Truth, and Saving Hope, and consulted on many other shows.

As an actress, White has performed in various theatre productions, TV series and films. In the mid 2000s, she was cast in the ensemble mockumentary series Hatching, Matching and Dispatching alongside Mary Walsh, Mark McKinney, Susan Kent, Rick Boland, Jonny Harris, and Joel Thomas Hynes. White reprised her role as Myrna Furey-Meany in 2017 for A Christmas Fury, a TV movie based on the series.

In 2018, White's script for the feature film Maudie, starring Sally Hawkins and Ethan Hawke, won her the Canadian Screen Award for Best Original Screenplay.

Together with Tassie Cameron, White co-created the action-packed female buddy cop series Pretty Hard Cases, which premiered on CBC Television in February 2021. White served as co-showrunner throughout the show's three-season run and directed four episodes. She and Cameron received a Writers Guild of Canada award in 2022 for penning the episode “Bananas”.

At the 2025 Atlantic International Film Festival, she won the Best Atlantic Director award for her film Blueberry Grunt.

== Filmography ==
=== As writer ===
- The Bread Maker (2003)
- Rabbittown (2006)
- Hatching, Matching and Dispatching (2005, three episodes)
- Life with Derek (2006, one episode)
- MVP (2008, four episodes)
- Down to the Dirt (2008)
- Sophie (2009, one episode)
- Crackie (2009)
- 18 to Life (2009, one episode)
- Rookie Blue (2010, nine episodes)
- Saving Hope (2012, three episodes)
- Relative Happiness (2014)
- Orphan Black (2015, one episode)
- Maudie (2016)
- The Catch (2016)
- Mary Kills People (2017)
- A Christmas Fury (2017)
- Ten Days in the Valley (2017)
- Frontier (2017)
- Little Dog (2018)
- Pretty Hard Cases (2021)
- Blueberry Grunt (2025)

=== As producer ===
- Rabbittown (2006)
- Crackie (2009)
- Little Man (2013)
- Me2 (2013)
- Saving Hope (2012)
- Rookie Blue (2012)
- Orphan Black (2015)
- The Catch (2016)
- Ten Days in The Valley (2017)
- Frontier (2017)
- Little Dog (
- Little Orphans (2020)
- Pretty Hard Cases (2021)

=== As director ===
- Diamonds in a Bucket (2007)
- Spoiled (2008)
- Crackie (2009)
- Imaginary Heroine (2012)
- Little Dog (2018)
- My Perfect Landing (2020)
- Nurses (2020) - episode 1.7: "Lifeboat"
- Burden of Truth (2020) - episode #23: "Crisis of Faith"
- Pretty Hard Cases (2021)
- Blueberry Grunt (2025)

=== As actress ===
- Misery Harbour (1999)
- Violet (2000)
- Lexx (1999, two episodes)
- The Bread Maker (2003)
- Hatching, Matching and Dispatching (2005, six episodes)
- Rabbittown (2006)
- Young Triffie (2006)
- ReGenesis (2006, one episode)
- MVP (2008, five episodes)
- Down to the Dirt (2008)
- Grown Up Movie Star (2009)
- Republic of Doyle (2010, one episode)
- A Christmas Fury (2017)
- Nurses (2020, episode #7: "Lifeboat")
- Pretty Hard Cases (2021)
