= Hunting Pignut =

- Directed by: Martine Blue
- Written by: Martine Blue
- Produced by: Heidi Wagner
- Starring: Taylor Hickson; Joel Thomas Hynes
- Cinematography: Stéphanie Weber Biron
- Edited by: Martine Blue
- Music by: Simon Miminis; Dani Bailey
- Distributed by: A71 Entertainment
- Release date: September 16, 2016 (Atlantic Film Festival)
- Running time: 95 minutes
- Country: Canada
- Language: English

Hunting Pignut is a 2016 Canadian drama film, written and directed by Martine Blue. The film stars Taylor Hickson as Bernice, a young girl who sets off on her own in pursuit of Pignut (Joel Thomas Hynes) after he crashes her father's funeral and steals the ashes.

The film premiered at the Whistler Film Festival in 2016, before going into general release in 2017. Hickson won the Rising Star Award at Whistler, and was nominated for a Leo Award for Best Actress. At the Arizona International Film Festival in 2017, the film won the award for Best First Feature.

Dani Bailey received a Canadian Screen Award nomination for Best Original Song at the 6th Canadian Screen Awards in 2018 for the song "Rid the Dark".
