= Cast No Shadow (film) =

- Film poster
- Directed by: Christian Sparkes
- Written by: Joel Thomas Hynes
- Based on: Say Nothing Saw Wood by Joel Thomas Hynes
- Produced by: Christian Sparkes; Chris Agoston; Allison White
- Starring: Percy Hynes White; Mary-Colin Chisholm; Joel Thomas Hynes
- Cinematography: Scott McClellan
- Edited by: Jonathan Eagan
- Production companies: Away Films; Telefilm Canada; The Screen Asylum
- Distributed by: Turn Key Films (U.S.); Turn Key Films (UK)
- Release date: September 13, 2014 (AFF)
- Running time: 85 min.
- Country: Canada
- Language: English

Cast No Shadow is a 2014 Canadian feature film. Directed by Christian Sparkes and written by Joel Thomas Hynes, the film stars Percy Hynes White as Jude Traynor, a troubled teenager who forms a friendship with a reclusive older woman (Mary-Colin Chisholm) after his abusive father (Hynes) is sent to jail.

The film premiered at the Atlantic Film Festival and received awards from the festival for Best Atlantic Feature, Best Director, Best Screenplay, Best Actress, Best Actor and Best Cinematography. The film garnered four Canadian Screen Award nominations at the 3rd Canadian Screen Awards, including Best Picture, Best Adapted Screenplay, Best Art Direction/Production Design (Xavier Georges) and Best Original Score (Jeffrey Morrow).

== Plot ==
Set in Newfoundland, Cast No Shadow is a harrowing film that is centered around the life of 13-year-old Jude Traynor.

The film begins as Jude and his best friend Ricky scale the edge of a cliff towards a cavern which they believe habitats a troll. While the two boys walk along the cliff's edge they get into an argument that escalates into a physical altercation. The altercation ends when Jude pushes Ricky off the cliff, causing Ricky to break his leg.

After the altercation Ricky's father picks up Ricky and contemptuously shuns Jude. As the night grows old Jude roams the woods and sees an old lady is picked up by his father Angus. Before arriving at their home, the two deliver illegal drugs to houses. After an erroneous drop-off Jude is chastised by his father. When Jude and Angus return to their home it is revealed that it is Jude's birthday and that Angus is a widower.

After his father falls asleep Jude enters the basement where his prized possessions are stored. In a chest are items he has stolen, which have all been spray-painted gold, and lining the wall are stacks of books.

The next day, Jude meets up with Nancy and attends a court hearing regarding his father. After he makes amends with Ricky he relaxes, slouched against a tree. While relaxing he is startled by the old lady that he saw in the woods. Jude learns that the woman, who he and Nancy liken to a witch, is named Alfreda Jackson.

Jude's journey throughout the film is anchored on his relationship with his father, Angus, Alfreda, and Nancy.

Jude's relationship with his father remains contentious throughout the film. When Angus gets into trouble with the law Jude lives with Alfreda. While living with Alfreda, Jude learns about his past. He learns that his mother had died after pregnancy and that Alfreda had delivered him.

At the end of the film, the drugs Jude was supposed to deliver for his father were stolen by classmates. Scared, Jude runs away from home. Angus tracks Jude down and finds him at Alfreda's house. Angus attacks them both and the fight ends when Alfreda stabs and kills Angus.

Jude then runs to the cavern that he and Ricky attempted to enter at the beginning of the film. On this attempt Jude succeeds in entering. The film ends with Jude looking at the cave wall in a different manner because the events he experienced have changed his outlook.

== Cast ==
- Percy Hynes White as Jude: A young and short-tempered 13-year-old misfit who steals, has a broken family and an expansive imagination.
- Gavin Snow as Ricky: A young boy who is Jude's best friend.
- Leslie Amminson as Nancy: An adventurous girl who serves as Jude's love interest throughout the film.
- Mary-Colin Chisholm as Alfreda Jackson: A kind-hearted old lady who is likened to a witch by Jude, Nancy and Ricky.
- Joel Thomas Hynes as Angus: The surly and abusive father of Jude.
- Stephen Lush as Sheriff: The town sheriff who exacts discipline on Jude and his father, Angus.
- Des Walsh as Ricky's Father: Father of Ricky who dislikes Angus.

== Reception ==
Cast No Shadow was well received by Canadian film festivals and screen awards. It received nominations and awards from the Alliance of Canadian Cinema, Television and Radio Artists, the Atlantic Film Festival, the Canadian Screen Awards, and the Edmonton International Film Festival.

Linda Bernard from the Toronto Star states, "Sparkes shows a confident hand as director..." and gave the film a rating of 3/4 stars.

Tara Throne from The Coast states, "It's not one minute of fun, but it's equal parts scary and sad, and adds another dimension to the art of the already impressive province from which it comes."

== Accolades ==
Cast No Shadow has been nominated for 13 awards and has won 9.

ACTRA Awards (2015):

- Winner of the "Outstanding Female Actor in a Leading Role": Mary-Colin Chisholm

Atlantic Film Festival (2014):

- Winner of the "Best Atlantic Feature Film or Video"
- Winner of the "Best Direction" Award: Christian Sparkes
- Winner of the "Best Cinematography" Award: Scott McClellan
- Winner of the "Best Screenplay" Award: Joel Thomas Hynes
- Winner of the "Best Acting - Male" Award: Percy Hynes White
- Winner of the "Best Acting - Female" Award: Mary-Colin Chisholm

Canadian Screen Awards (2015):

- Nominee for the "Best Motion Picture" Award: Chris Agoston, Christian Sparkes, Allison White
- Nominee for the "Achievement in Art Direction/Production Design" Award: Xavier Georges
- Nominee for the "Achievement in Music - Original Score" Award: Jeff Morrow
- Nominee for the "Adapted Screenplay" Award: Joel Thomas Hynes

Edmonton International Film Festival (2014):

- Winner of the "Rising Star: Actor" Award. Percy Hynes White
- Winner of the "Rising Star" Award. Percy Hynes White
