= Levi Meaden =

Canadian actor

- Born: 1987/1988 (age 38–39); Saskatoon, Saskatchewan, Canada
- Occupation: Actor
- Years active: 2012–present

Levi Meaden (born 1987 or 1988) is a Canadian actor.

== Early life and career ==
Meaden was born in Saskatoon, Saskatchewan, and raised in Calgary, Alberta. After graduating from William Aberhart High School, he studied acting at Prague Film School. He made his screen debut in 2009, appearing in the sixteen-minute crime-drama film short Brotherly Love, which Marcus Schwenzel wrote and directed. Three years later, he made his full-length feature debut in writer-director David DeCoteau's horror film 1313: Bigfoot Island, part of the 1313 horror-thriller video series. Meaden then appeared in the first season of the CW's fantasy drama series The Secret Circle in 2011.

In 2014, Meaden appeared in three television series, including Almost Human on Fox, the series premiere of The 100 on the CW, and the final season of The Killing. In 2015, he appeared in the fantasy series Olympus and the crime dramedy iZombie. The following year, he appeared in the superhero action-adventure drama Legends of Tomorrow (2016). Meaden also appeared as Matt Copeland, the eldest child in the Copeland family, in all 13 episodes of Syfy's apocalyptic survival series Aftermath.

In 2017, Meaden returned to film screens, including appearing in 20th Century Fox's War for the Planet of the Apes, followed by writer-director Kurtis David Harder's sci-fi thriller Incontrol. He followed this with his leading-role debut in the drama-thriller Alice in the Attic, written and directed by Jordan Anthony Greer. Meaden began 2018 with an appearance in Pacific Rim Uprising and also appeared in Breaking In.

== Filmography ==
Film
Year	Title	Role	Notes
2012	1313: Bigfoot Island	Brett	Direct-to-video film
2015	Alice in the Attack	Jack	
2017	War for the Planet of the Apes	Soldier	
2017	Incontrol	Mark	
2018	Pacific Rim: Uprising	Cadet Ilya Zaslavsky	
2018	Breaking In	Sam	
TBA	Captive Mind	TBA	Post-production

Television
Year	Title	Role	Notes
2012	The Secret Circle	Teenager	Episode: "Prom"
2014	Almost Human	Marshall McCarty	Episode: "Perception"
2014	The 100	Drew	3 episodes
2014	The Killing	A.J. Fielding	Main role (season 4)
2015	Olympus	Kimon	Recurring role
2015	iZombie	Nate	Episode: "Dead Rat, Live Rat, Brown Rat, White Rat"
2016	Legends of Tomorrow	Tommy Fuller	Episode: "Night of the Hawk"
2016	Revenge Porn	Carol Cook	Television film
2016	Aftermath	Matt Copeland	Main role
2019	Unspeakable	Peter Landry	Recurring role
2019	Agents of S.H.I.E.L.D	Agent Fox	Episode: "Missing Pieces"
2022	The Resident	Stewart Mayer	Episode: "Peek and Shriek"
2025	The Rookie	Connor	2 episodes
2026	Tracker	TJ	Episode: "Alaskan Wild"
2026	Criminal Minds	Noel Warner	Episode: "Now and Then"
