= Sean Buckley (producer) =

Canadian producer and director

Sean Buckley (born 1967 or 1968) is a Canadian film, television, branded content and commercial producer and director based out of Toronto, Ontario.

== Career ==
Sean is the owner and CEO of Buck Productions, which has been named on Realscreen's Global 100 list for 13 straight years. Sean is also the chief content officer of the CineCoup Film Accelerator. Buck Productions and the CineCoup Film Accelerator partnered to produce HumanTown, WolfCop and Another WolfCop.

Sean’s notable productions include the feature film Astronaut with Jessica Adams and Shelagh McLeod, which stars Richard Dreyfuss and Colm Feore, and had its international premiere at Eiff in June 2019. Sean also produced the feature films Defendor starring Woody Harrelson, A Beginner's Guide to Endings, Coopers' Camera, Running Mates, Servitude with Dave Foley, Pretend We're Kissingstarring Zoë Kravitz, Wet Bum and Milton's Secret, starring Donald Sutherland and Michelle Rodriguez. Horror flick Making Monsters, another project on Sean’s slate which is currently in its festival run, won Best Horror Film at Shriekfest 2019, Best Actor Feature at Nightmares Film Festival 2019 and Best Director at HorrOrigins 2019. Sean is also producer on the short BOUNDLESS, which just wrapped principal photography in Guelph, ON, and is executive producer on The Burglar, which had an illustrious festival run, being accepted into 18 different festivals all over the world - most notably the Toronto Black Film Festival.

Sean produced Under Pressure: 9k which premiered on MotorTrend in March 2019. He also produced four 10-part unscripted series for Reelz, all four series premiered in the U.S by March 2019. Another notable show Sean is credited on is Merchants of the Wild, which aired on Aboriginal Peoples Television Network in Canada in February 2019 - season two of the show is just wrapped principal photography. He produced the television series Rich Bride Poor Bride, Saw Dogs, Deals from the Dark Side, Cake Walk, Wedding Dress Wars, Petal Pushers and The Girly Ghosthunters.

With a background in branded content, Sean also produced Two Minutes to Transform, Like A Tourist, The Mitsubishi City Chase, McMorris and McMorris for MTV and Red Bull Media, Canada's Best Beauty Talent for Rogers Media and L'Oreal Paris, Our Family Vacation for Canon, and The Project: Guatemala for GroupM.
