= Joel Thomas Hynes =

Canadian writer, actor and director (born 1976)

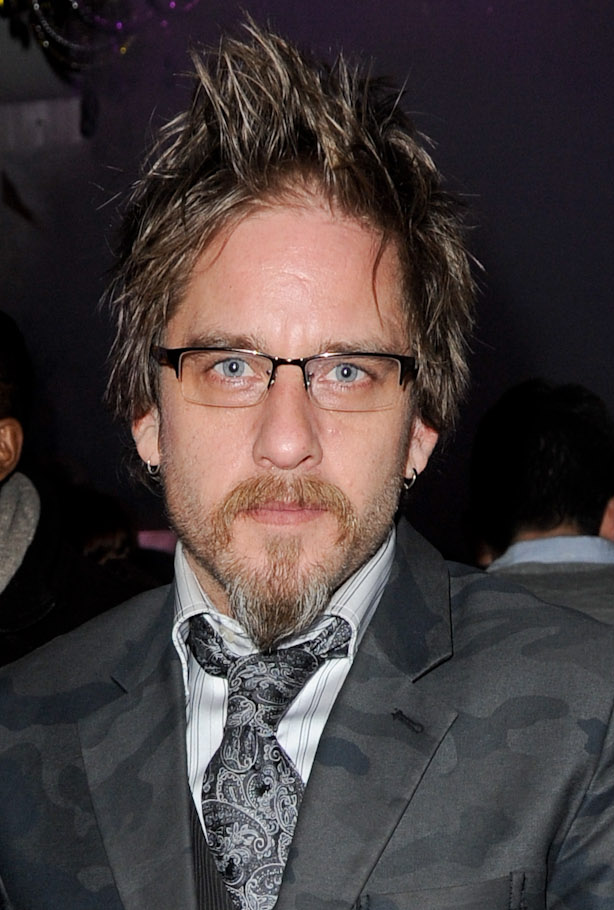
- Hynes at the 2014 Cineplex Entertainment Film Program
- Born: September 29, 1976 (age 50); Calvert, Newfoundland and Labrador, Canada
- Occupations: Novelist; screenwriter; actor; producer; director
- Partner: Sherry White (2000-2008)
- Children: Percy Hynes White
- Writing career
- Years active: 2000–present
- Notable works: Down to the Dirt, Cast No Shadow

Joel Thomas Hynes (born September 29, 1976) is a Canadian writer, actor and director known for his dark characters and vision of modern underground Canada.

== Writing ==
=== We'll All Be Burnt in Our Beds Some Night ===
His 2017 novel We'll All Be Burnt in Our Beds Some Night won the Governor General's Award for English-language Fiction and the Winterset Award and was longlisted for the Scotiabank Giller Prize.

=== Down to the Dirt ===
His debut novel Down to the Dirt won the Percy Janes First Novel Award, was shortlisted for the Atlantic Book Award and the Winterset Award, and was longlisted for the International Dublin Literary Award and the ReLit Award.

The unabridged audiobook edition of Down to the Dirt narrated by Johnny Harris, Joel Thomas Hynes and Sherry White was recorded by Rattling Books in 2006.

Down to the Dirt has been translated into numerous languages and adapted to stage.

=== Right Away Monday ===
The follow-up to Down to the Dirt was the gritty novel Right Away Monday, also available with HarperCollins Publishers.

=== Say Nothing Saw Wood ===
Hynes's gothic novella Say Nothing Saw Wood, inspired by a true story of a grisly murder that happened in his hometown in 1971, was adapted to the big screen under the title Cast No Shadow, and went on to receive numerous accolades on the festival circuit. Hynes was awarded the Michael Weir Award for best Atlantic Screenwriter at the Atlantic Film Festival and was nominated for a Canadian Screen Award for Best Adapted Screenplay.

=== Cast No Shadow ===
In Cast No Shadow, Hynes plays opposite his real life son Percy Hynes White. White won numerous accolades for his portrayal of Cast No Shadow's young, disturbed protagonist Jude Traynor, including the Rising Star Award at the Edmonton International Film Festival and the Best Actor Award at the Atlantic Film Festival.

== Music ==
He has released two albums - JTH Live at the LSPU Hall and 2018's Dead Man's Melody, a concept album that loosely follows the story of a doomed relationship that ends in murder and mayhem with the album's main character barricaded inside a house, unabashed, determined to go out in a hail of bullets. The album was produced in Toronto by Eamon McGrath.

== Film and television ==
Hynes began acting in films such as Messiah from Montreal (2001), Ashore (2002) and The Bread Maker (2003). He later wrote for and acted in the television series Hatching, Matching and Dispatching (2005). He also appeared in Rabbittown (2006).

Hynes played the lead in the 2008 film adaptation of his first novel, Down to the Dirt. He later adapted his novella, Say Nothing Saw Wood, into the 2014 film Cast No Shadow. In this film he acted alongside his son, Percy Hynes White. Hynes won the Michael Weir Award for best Atlantic screenwriting at the Atlantic Film Festival and was nominated for a Canadian Screen Award for Best Adapted Screenplay for this film.

In 2018, Hynes created CBC comedy series Little Dog. He was an executive producer and starred as Tommy "Little Dog" Ross, a boxer who returns to the ring after years away. He has also had recurring roles on Republic of Doyle, Orphan Black, Mary Kills People, Frontier and Below.

== Awards and honours ==
Hynes was named Artist of the Year by the Newfoundland and Labrador Arts Council in 2008, has received the Lawrence Jackson Writer's Award, the Summerwork's Theatre Festival's Contra Guys Award, and also in 2008 won the Cuffer Prize.

== Personal life ==
Hynes currently divides his time between Newfoundland, Toronto, and California. He is the nephew of singer-songwriter Ron Hynes.

== Works ==
=== Novels ===
- Down to the Dirt (2005)
- Right Away Monday (2007)
- Say Nothing Saw Wood (2013)
- We'll All Be Burnt in Our Beds Some Night (2017)

=== Audiobooks ===
- Down to the Dirt (2006)

=== Plays ===
- The Devil You Don't Know (co-written with Sherry White) (2011)
- Say Nothing Saw Wood (2009)
- Broken Accidents (2010)
- Incinerator Road (2011)

=== Chapbook ===
- God Help Thee: A Manifesto (2011)

=== Poetry ===
- Straight Razor Days (2012)

== Filmography ==
=== Films ===
- Messiah from Montreal (2001)
- Ashore (2002)
- The Bread Maker (2003)
- Down to the Dirt (2008)
- Crackie (2009)
- Grown Up Movie Star (2009)
- The Con Artist (2010)
- Cast No Shadow (2014)
- Relative Happiness (2015)
- First Round Down
- Hunting Pignut (2016)
- Goalie (2019)
- Body and Bones (2019)
- Wildhood (2021)
- A Small Fortune (2021)
- Blueberry Grunt (2025)

=== TV ===
- Hatching, Matching and Dispatching (2005)
- Rabbittown (2006)
- ReGenesis (2008, one episode)
- Republic of Doyle (2013)
- The Book of Negroes (2015)
- Orphan Black (2016)
- Frontier (2017)
- Little Dog (2018)
- Trickster (2020)
- Hudson and Rex (2021)
- Sheriff Country (2025)
- Below (2026)
