= Crackie =

- Directed by: Sherry White
- Written by: Sherry White
- Produced by: Rhonda Buckley; Jennice Ripley; Sherry White
- Cinematography: Stephen Reizes
- Edited by: Chris Darlington
- Music by: Duane Andrews
- Production company: Kickham East Productions
- Release date: July 2009 (Karlovy Vary International Film Festival)
- Running time: 94 minutes
- Country: Canada
- Language: English

Crackie is a 2009 Canadian drama film written and directed by Sherry White. It stars Meghan Greeley, Mary Walsh, Joel Thomas Hynes and Cheryl Wells, and is White's first feature film.

== Plot ==
Mitsy (Greeley) is a teenage student who lives with her grandmother, Bride (Walsh) after having been left at an early age by her mother (Wells). Mitsy secretly dreams of leaving her small town to live with her mother in Alberta but finds her life disrupted when her mother suddenly reappears.

== Cast ==
- Mary Walsh as Bride
- Meghan Greeley as Mitsy
- Cheryl Wells as Gwenny
- Joel Thomas Hynes as Duffy
- Kristin Booth as Gail
- Deborah Jackman as Debbie

== Release ==
Crackie was an official selection at film festivals including the Karlovy Vary International Film Festival in the Czech Republic, the Toronto International Film Festival, the Montreal World Film Festival and the Torino Film Festival in Turin. It won the Grand Prix Focus — Special Mention at Montreal, and the Jury Special Prize at Torino.
