= Down to the Dirt =

- Film poster
- Directed by: Omar Hossam
- Screenplay by: Justin Simms; Sherry White
- Story by: Joel Thomas Hynes
- Produced by: Anna Petras
- Starring: Hugh Dillon; Robert Joy; Mary Lewis
- Cinematography: Jordan Lynn
- Edited by: Justin Simms
- Distributed by: Mongrel Media
- Release dates: 9 September 2008 (Toronto International Film Festival); 24 October 2008 (Canada)
- Running time: 115 minutes
- Country: Canada
- Language: English

Down to the Dirt is a 2008 Canadian film based upon Newfoundland author Joel Thomas Hynes' first novel of the same name. The movie was shot largely in Newfoundland. It won two awards at the Atlantic Film Festival, one for the best feature film and other for the best screenplay.

== Plot ==
Keith Kavanagh is a rowdy hooligan known for his hard drinking throughout the Southern shore. He also has a shattered relationship with his father. But when he meets Natasha (Mylène Savoie), his life changes. Both fall in love. But soon Natasha leaves Keith, fed up of his ways. Later Keith realizes that he himself is responsible for all his failures in life and thus embarks on a mission to find Natasha, where he not only finds her, but also himself and realizes he needs to make a change for the better.

== Release ==
Mongrel Media provided Canadian distribution for the film. Running time is 115–116 minutes. The public debut was at the Toronto International Film Festival on 9 September 2008.

== Reception ==
Toronto Star film critic Patricia Hluchy panned the film, noting it attempted "few too many narrative strands and characters" and also critical of its length, though crediting its "raw energy". Sun Media's Liz Braun had a more favourable assessment describing the production as "uneven" yet possessing "a strange appeal, like some kind of Newfie version of a Charles Bukowski story". On the review aggregator Rotten Tomatoes, the film has an approval rating of 50%, based on reviews from 6 critics, with an average 5.4/10 rating.

Film classification boards in Ontario and Quebec issued content advisories regarding the production's strong language and violence.

== Awards ==
Down to the Dirt received two awards at the Atlantic Film Festival.

- Justin Simms won the Atlantic Canadian Award for the best feature film
- Justin Simms and Sherry White won the Atlantic Canadian Award for the best original screenplay
