= Hatching, Matching and Dispatching =

- Genre: Comedy
- Created by: Mary Walsh
- Directed by: Henry Sarwer-Foner; Stephen Reynolds
- Starring: Mary Walsh; Shaun Majumder; Mark McKinney; Joel Thomas Hynes; Jonny Harris; Susan Kent
- Theme music composer: Ron Hynes
- Country of origin: Canada
- Original language: English
- No. of seasons: 1
- No. of episodes: 6 + pilot

Production
- Producer: Mary Sexton
- Production locations: St. John's, Newfoundland and Labrador, Canada
- Running time: 22 minutes

Original release
- Network: CBC Television
- Release: January 17, 2005 – February 10, 2006

Hatching, Matching and Dispatching is a Canadian television sitcom that aired on CBC Television in 2006. The show starred Mary Walsh as Mamie Lou Furey, the matriarch of a family in Cats Gut Cove, Newfoundland and Labrador who owns a combination ambulance, wedding and funeral business. The show's title – and a basic summary of its premise – had previously appeared as a one-time gag in a "Wake of the Week" sketch on CODCO.

The cast included Sherry White, Mark McKinney, Rick Boland, Joel Thomas Hynes, Jonny Harris, Shaun Majumder and Susan Kent. Hynes, White and Walsh were also writers for the series, along with Ed Macdonald and Adriana Maggs.

The series pilot aired January 17, 2005 as one of three CBC sitcom prototypes which included Getting Along Famously and Walter Ego. The CBC employed a viewer response poll to gauge interest in these pilots, a technique previously employed with the shows Rideau Hall and An American in Canada.

Hatching, Matching and Dispatching began shooting its first season of six episodes in Petty Harbour-Maddox Cove on July 18, 2005 and began airing as a regular series on January 6, 2006 with six episodes, following a rebroadcast of the original pilot on December 30, 2005. The episodes were repeated from July 18 to August 22, 2006. The CBC subsequently announced the cancellation of the series after its sole season. Newfoundland musician Ron Hynes composed and performed the show's theme song.

At the 21st Gemini Awards, Walsh and Macdonald won the award for Best Writing in a Comedy Program or Series, for the series pilot.

== A Christmas Fury ==
In September 2016, Walsh confirmed a television film based on the series was in production. Directed by Warren P. Sonoda, A Christmas Fury premiered on CBC on December 3, 2017. Walsh and McKinney received Canadian Screen Award nominations for lead actress and lead actor in a limited series or dramatic program at the 7th Canadian Screen Awards in 2019.
