= Madonna bibliography =

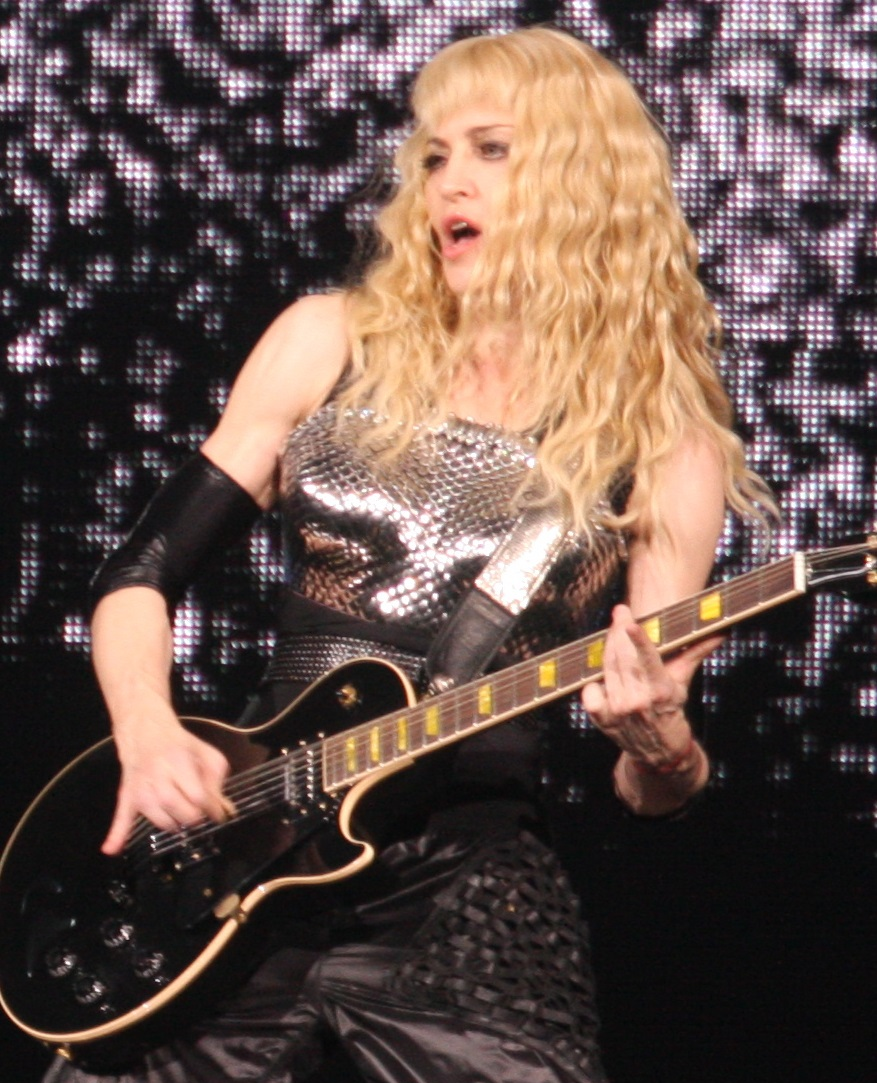
- Madonna performing on the Sticky & Sweet Tour (2008). Pictures taken during the tour by her manager Guy Oseary were released in the coffee table book titled, Madonna: Sticky & Sweet.
- Articles↙: 11
- Coffee table books↙: 11
- Picture books↙: 7
- Chapter books↙: 12
- Biography↙: 1

American entertainer Madonna has written eleven coffee table books, eleven articles in different publications and contributed a piece in a biography. She has also ventured into children's literature, writing seven picture books and twelve chapter books. Three of her books have topped The New York Times Best Seller list.

Her first release as an author was the coffee table book Sex (1992), published under her company Maverick. It consisted of sexually provocative and explicit images, photographed by Steven Meisel. The book received negative reaction from the media and the general public, but sold 1.5 million copies at $50 each in a matter of days. Madonna continued releasing coffee table photography books, including those associated with her concert tours like Madonna: The Girlie Show (1995), Madonna Confessions (2006) and Madonna: Sticky & Sweet (2009). She also wrote forewords for a number of books, including Alan Parker's coffee table book about the making of the film Evita (1996) and wrote a chapter for The Emperor's New Clothes: An All-Star Retelling of the Classic Fairy Tale (1998). Madonna has also written columns for publications like Harper's Bazaar, the inaugural issue of George magazine and the Israeli newspaper Yedioth Ahronoth.

In 2003, Madonna signed a contract with Callaway Arts & Entertainment. The first release was the children's book, The English Roses, which was translated into 42 different languages over 100 countries. The book debuted at number one on The New York Times Best Seller list, spending a total of 18 weeks there. Telling the story of five friends, The English Roses was deemed by critics as a reflection of Madonna's childhood, and received mixed reaction. Her second children's book, Mr. Peabody's Apples, was released in the same year and also debuted at number one on The New York Times Best Seller list. She continued releasing other books like Yakov and the Seven Thieves, The Adventures of Abdi and Lotsa de Casha; all five books released were included as part of an audiobook in 2006. As of 2007, her first six children's books have sold over three million copies worldwide.

Madonna's interest in Kabbalah inspired her to venture into the children's book market. Her Kabbalah teacher had suggested her to share her spiritual knowledge in the form of written stories. All the books included the lessons Madonna had learned in Kabbalah, teaching about strong morality and warning against greed and envy. A sequel for The English Roses was released in 2006, titled The English Roses: Too Good to be True. Madonna also released a total of twelve chapter books for the series in 2007. Her success as a children's author was noted by Ed Pilkington from The Guardian, who believed that Madonna "lured a host of other celebrities and publishers into the [children's book] market".

== Coffee table books ==
Book title	Year	Other author(s)	Publisher	Identifiers	Notes	Ref.
Sex	1992	—N/a	Maverick; Warner Books; Callaway	ISBN 978-84-406-3117-6; LCCN 92-73419; OCLC 26846575	The book contains erotica influenced photographs taken by Steven Meisel and film frames shot by Fabien Baron. An instant commercial success, Sex sold over 150,000 copies on its first day of release. A week later, the book's sales exceeded the 500,000 units there and eventually topped The New York Times Best Seller list. Declared as the "publishing event" of the century, Sex sold more than 1.5 million copies worldwide.	
Madonna: The Girlie Show	1995	Glenn O'Brien	Callaway	ISBN 978-0-935112-22-1; LCCN 94-72271; OCLC 34731931	The photographs in the book showcased behind-the-scenes of the 1993 Girlie Show World Tour with images taken by Herb Ritts. An accompanying CD was released with live tracks "Like a Virgin", "In This Life", and "Why's It So Hard".	
The Making of Evita	1996	Alan Parker foreword by Madonna	HarperCollins	ISBN 978-0-00-649095-1; LCCN 96-42479; OCLC 35318289	Featuring an introduction by Madonna, The Making of Evita chronicles the creation of the 1996 American musical drama film Evita. It features more than a hundred film stills and photographs. Alexandra Jacobs from Entertainment Weekly gave it a rating of C−, criticizing the image captions and the price of the book.	
The Emperor's New Clothes: An All-Star Retelling of the Classic Fairy Tale	1998	Various (Note: Madonna with Carrie Fisher, Penny Marshall, Dan Aykroyd, Geena Davis, Rosie O'Donnell, Fran Drescher, Joan Rivers, Steven Spielberg, Norman Schwarzkopf, John Lithgow, Harrison Ford, Melissa Mathison, Angela Lansbury, Jason Alexander, Ruth Westheimer, Calvin Klein, Liam Neeson, Nathan Lane, Jeff Goldblum, Melissa Joan Hart, Jonathan Taylor Thomas and Hans Christian Andersen.)	Houghton Mifflin Harcourt	ISBN 978-0-15-100436-2; LCCN 97-32021; OCLC 40712166	This fully illustrated retelling of the classic fairy tale by Hans Christian Andersen was accompanied with a CD containing audio readings from 45 personnel from the entertainment world. Madonna penned the eighth prose piece of 1,000 words, titled "The Empress", and the book features a cartoon rendition of herself as Marie Antoinette.	
X-Static Process	2003	—N/a	Assaf Books and Art	ASIN B000JYDFYU	In 2002, Madonna had collaborated with photographer Steven Klein for an art installation called X-STaTIC PRO=CeSS. The photographs were released as the titular coffee table book, containing 1,000 pages of images. Author Lucy O'Brien described the images as "a performer in her rehearsal space".	
Nobody Knows Me	2004	—N/a	Boy Toy, Inc.	ASIN B000OCOE60	Available for one month only via Madonna's official website. Contained 52 pages of never before seen images of her.	
Madonna Confessions	2008	Guy Oseary	powerHouse	ISBN 978-1-57687-481-3; OCLC 233939934	Behind-the-scenes and on-stage pictures from Madonna's 2006 Confessions Tour, with photography by her manager Guy Oseary. The book consists of 224 pages of around 250 color photographs, handpicked by Oseary and Madonna, and are interspersed with quotes from her.	
I Am Because We Are	2009	Kristen Ashburn foreword by Madonna	powerHouse	ISBN 978-1-57687-482-0; LCCN 2008-939784; OCLC 260208760	The book contains excerpts from interviews with Malawian children, their biographies, and images taken by photographer Kristen Ashburn for Madonna's 2007 documentary of the same name. Sales proceeds were donated to the charitable organization, Raising Malawi.	
Madonna: Sticky & Sweet	2009	Guy Oseary	powerHouse	ISBN 978-1-57687-532-2; LCCN 2009-937605; OCLC 547415930	Behind-the-scenes and on-stage photography from Madonna's Sticky & Sweet Tour (2008–09) by Oseary, with editing from photographer Tom Munro. The book consists of 308 pages of over 500 full-color photographs, and was limited to 7,500 initial numbered copies for purchase.	
Tom Munro	2010	Tom Munro foreword by Madonna	Damiani	ISBN 978-88-6208-125-2; LCCN 2012-451451; OCLC 495778900	Munro's self-titled first monograph book consists of photographs taken by him throughout his career. One of Madonna's images by Munro was used as the book cover, and she also wrote the foreword. The book was released with an exhibition in Paris, displaying portraits shot by him.	
Mayumi's Kitchen: Macrobiotic Cooking for Body and Soul	2010	Mayumi Nishimura foreword by Madonna	Kodansha	ISBN 978-4-7700-3110-5; LCCN 2009-50422; OCLC 456181378	Mayumi Nishimura worked as Madonna's private chef for seven years, and she specializes in macrobiotic cooking. In 2010, she released the cook book Mayumi's Kitchen: Macrobiotic Cooking for Body and Soul, which contains a foreword by Madonna.	

== Children's books ==
=== Picture books ===
Book title	Year	Illustrator	Publisher	Identifiers	Notes	Ref.
The English Roses	2003	Jeffrey Fulvimari	Callaway/Puffin	ISBN 978-0-670-03678-3; LCCN 2003-12261; OCLC 52765827	A moral tale about five friends, The English Roses was inspired by Madonna's daughter Lourdes. It sold over 500,000 copies worldwide in its first month and 8,000 copies in the first week in United Kingdom. The book debuted at number one on The New York Times Best Seller list.	
Mr. Peabody's Apples	2003	Loren Long	Callaway/Puffin	ISBN 978-0-670-05883-9; LCCN 2003-16198; OCLC 52970747	Madonna's second foray into children's book, Mr. Peabody's Apples talks of a juvenile protagonist called Billy Little, and the importance of always telling the truth. It debuted at number one on The New York Times Best Seller list.	
Yakov and the Seven Thieves	2004	Gennady Spirin	Callaway/Puffin	ISBN 978-0-670-05887-7; LCCN 2004-7000; OCLC 54852649	The story takes place in 18th century Europe with Spirin choosing a baroque painting style to depict it. Yakov and the Seven Thieves talks about a dying boy named Mikhail and his parents search for a cure for him. It debuted at number seven on The New York Times Best Seller list.	
The Adventures of Abdi	2004	Olga Dugina; Andrej Dugin	Callaway/Puffin	ISBN 978-0-670-05889-1; LCCN 2004-22885; OCLC 56682267	The book tells the story of Young Abdi, who works as an assistant to a magical jeweler named Eli. Madonna promoted the release with a number of magazine, radio and television interviews in London.	
Lotsa de Casha	2005	Rui Paes	Callaway/Puffin	ISBN 978-0-670-05888-4; LCCN 2005-7506; OCLC 58843456	Consisting of a fable, Lotsa de Casha is based on the phrase that "money cannot buy happiness". Depicting the characters as animal, the book tells about a rich Italian greyhound who is self-absorbed.	
The English Roses and Other Stories	2006	Stacy Peterson	Callaway/Puffin	ISBN 978-0-14-180654-9; OCLC 124504717	An audiobook with an "English Roses" style box, depicting Madonna reading to her daughter Lourdes, and son Rocco.	
The English Roses: Too Good to be True	2006	Stacy Peterson	Callaway/Puffin	ISBN 978-0-670-06147-1; LCCN 2006-24376; OCLC 71005736	The sequel to The English Roses continue the story of the friends as they prepare for their first school dance. Madonna appeared on Home Shopping Network (HSN) to promote the book	

=== Chapter books ===
Chapter books in The English Roses collection. All illustration by Jeffrey Fulvimari.

Book title	Year	Other author(s)	Publisher	Identifiers	Notes	Ref.
The English Roses: Friends for Life!	2007	—N/a	Puffin	ISBN 978-0-14-241114-8; LCCN 2007-280944; OCLC 173844877	The five girls—Nicole, Amy, Charlotte, Grace and Binah—are introduced with Question and Answer sections and more.	
The English Roses: Goodbye, Grace?	2007	Rebecca Gomez	Callaway/Puffin	ISBN 978-0-14-240883-4; LCCN 2007-280945; OCLC 946594657	Grace is afraid because her parents are acting strange. The English Roses have to find out the reason behind it.	
The English Roses: The New Girl	2007	Amy Cloud	Puffin	ISBN 978-0-14-240884-1; LCCN 2009-277827; OCLC 173846032	Nicole's friend comes to London and the other English Roses are worried that she is stealing Nicole away from them.	
The English Roses: A Rose by Any Other Name	2007	Erica Ottenberg	Puffin	ISBN 978-0-14-240885-8; LCCN 2009-284553; OCLC 173847330	The friendship of the English Roses is tested again, when the question arises who will be given the leading role in a school play.	
The English Roses: Big-Sister Blues	2008	Amy Cloud	Puffin	ISBN 978-0-14-241093-6; LCCN 2008-298250; OCLC 183265655	Amy thinks her life is changing for the worse when her mother becomes pregnant. The English Roses have to help her realize the good things about being a big sister.	
The English Roses: Being Binah	2008	Erica Ottenberg	Puffin	ISBN 978-0-14-241095-0; LCCN 2008-300749; OCLC 236164333	Binah is tired of being "the nice one" and tries to be someone else. The English Roses help her understand to be true to herself.	
The English Roses: Hooray for the Holidays!	2008	Amy Cloud	Callaway/Puffin	ISBN 978-0-14-241124-7; LCCN 2009-275463; OCLC 216938842	There is a Secret Santa gift exchange at school and Charlotte is determined to find the perfect gift. The English Roses have to help her remember the true meaning of Christmas.	
The English Roses: A Perfect Pair	2008	Erica Ottenberg	Puffin	ISBN 978-0-14-241125-4; LCCN 2009-278393; OCLC 216938890	Nicole gets entangled in the middle of school gossip and the English Roses have to save Valentine's Day.	
The English Roses: Runway Rose	2009	Amy Cloud	Puffin	ISBN 978-0-14-241126-1; LCCN 2009-280015; OCLC 236345008	Amy gets an after-school job at teen fashion week and seems to forget the English Roses.	
The English Roses: Ready, set, vote!	2010	Rebecca Gomez	Callaway/Puffin	ISBN 978-0-14-241127-8; LCCN 2010-275054; OCLC 268795753	School elections take place where Nicole runs for class president with Grace as campaign manager.	
The English Roses: American Dreams	2010	Rebecca Gomez	Puffin	ISBN 978-0-14-241128-5; LCCN 2010-278340; OCLC 268795755	The English Roses are on different vacations. Binah visits Grace's family in Atlanta.	
The English Roses: Catch the Bouquet!	2010	Amy Cloud	Puffin	ISBN 978-0-14-241129-2; LCCN 2010-277415; OCLC 318408057	Planning the perfect wedding: Miss Fluffernutter and Binah's father get married.	

== Articles ==
Title	Year	Publication type	Publication name	Identifiers	Notes	Ref.
The Day I Made the 'Like a Virgin' Video	1985	Magazine	Star Hits	ISSN 0260-3004	Madonna wrote about filming the music video for her 1984 single, "Like a Virgin".	
Madonna Makes Dance	1994	Magazine	Harper's Bazaar	ISSN 0017-7873	Madonna wrote about meeting dancer Martha Graham and her early days in New York as a dancer.	
If I Were President	1995	Magazine	George	ISSN 1084-662X	Madonna's ideas about what she would do as a president, including paying schoolteachers more than film stars and LGBT support in the armed forces.	
Me, Jean-Michel, Love and Money	1996	Newspaper	The Guardian	ISSN 0261-3077	Madonna wrote about her romance with artist Jean-Michel Basquiat to commemorate an exhibition of his paintings at the Serpentine Gallery in London. She sponsored the show.	
Madonna's Evita Diaries	1996	Magazine	Vanity Fair	ISSN 0733-8899; OCLC 824601197	Diary entry about filming for Evita.	
I'm Going to Miss You Gianni	1997	Magazine	Time	ISSN 0040-781X; OCLC 1311479	Madonna remembered her friend, fashion designer Gianni Versace, in this eulogy. Versace had been murdered outside his home two weeks ago by serial killer Andrew Cunanan.	
Madonna's Indian Summer	1998	Magazine	Rolling Stone	ISSN 0035-791X; OCLC 865185925	Madonna reminisced about her childhood during the summer, gardening with her father and favorite summer songs. The cover was shot by David LaChapelle and featured her as a Hindu Goddess.	
The Right Note in East Harlem	1998	Newspaper	New York Daily News	OCLC 137349460	A piece about American violinist and music educator Roberta Guaspari, whose life was made into a film called Music of the Heart in which Madonna was set to act but left due to creative differences.	
What I Know Now	2004	Magazine	People	ISSN 0093-7673; OCLC 1792449	On their 30th anniversary issue, People asked people from the entertainment industry, including Madonna, to write about the moment that had defined their career. She wrote about how Kabbalah had changed her life.	
How My Life Changed	2009	Newspaper	Yedioth Ahronoth	LCCN nr92-743	Madonna wrote about how Kabbalah led to her spiritual awakening when she was pregnant with her daughter Lourdes.	
Truth or Dare? Madonna's Back	2013	Magazine	Harper's Bazaar	ISSN 0017-7873	Madonna's thoughts about being daring in the music business. She also wrote about being raped at gunpoint during her early days in New York.	

== Biography ==
Book title	Year	Other author(s)	Publisher	Identifiers	Notes	Ref.
Keith Haring: The Authorized Biography	1992	Written by John Gruen	Fireside Books	ISBN 978-0-671-78150-7; OCLC 906277951	Madonna reminisced about her friend, artist Keith Haring, in a chapter about their early life in New York.	

== See also ==
- List of literary works by number of translations
