= The Adventures of Abdi =

Book by Madonna

- Book cover featuring artwork by Olga Dugina and Andrej Dugin
- Author: Madonna
- Illustrator: Olga Dugina; Andrej Dugin
- Cover artist: Olga Dugina; Andrej Dugin
- Subject: Moral; fairy tale
- Genre: Children's literature
- Set in: Middle East
- Publisher: Callaway
- Publication date: November 8, 2004
- Publication place: United States
- Media type: Print
- Pages: 32
- ISBN: 978-0-670-05889-1
- OCLC: 56682267
- LC Class: PZ8.M26

The Adventures of Abdi is a picture book written by American entertainer Madonna. It was released on November 8, 2004, by Callaway Arts & Entertainment. The book is a moral tale inspired from a 300 year-old story by rabbi Baal Shem Tov, that Madonna had heard from her Kabbalah teacher. It tells the story of Abdi who was given the task of delivering a precious necklace to the queen. Madonna was inspired to write The Adventures of Abdi by the settings in "Ali Baba and the Forty Thieves" and other folk stories from One Thousand and One Nights. Published in a 32-page jacketed hardcover format, the book was illustrated by Russian painters Olga Dugina and Andrej Dugin. Madonna promoted the release by appearing for book signing events as well as on television shows. The Adventures of Abdi was criticized for being Orientalist and promoting Kabbalah to children; its illustrations received positive feedback.

== Synopsis ==
In a faraway land lived a boy named Abdi. He was an orphan raised by the great jeweler Eli. One day, Eli was commissioned to create a necklace for the queen. Once the necklace was completed, Eli gave it to Abdi for traveling to the royal palace and giving it to the queen on her birthday. The boy starts his journey across the desert. One night while sleeping, Abdi is robbed by two Bedouins, who steal the necklace and replace it with a live snake. Unaware of the theft, Abdi reaches the palace and meets the king where the snake is revealed inside Abdi's bag. Seeing this, the king gets really upset and orders the boy to be thrown in the dungeon.

Eli learns what happened to Abdi, and hurries along reaching the palace a week later. Because of his faith and honesty, he is able to convince the king that after placing the snake around the queen's neck, it would turn into a diamond necklace. As the queen places the snake around her neck, it slowly becomes a precious encrusted necklace. The king is impressed and releases Abdi, rewarding him and Eli. News about Abdi and Eli's magical necklace reaches the two Bedouins who had stolen the original one from Abdi. They reach the royal palace to see the king with a large bag stuffed with real snakes. However, the snakes were not charmed into jewelry and instead ended up frightening the poor queen. The enraged king orders them to be thrown in the dungeon forever.

== Background and writing ==
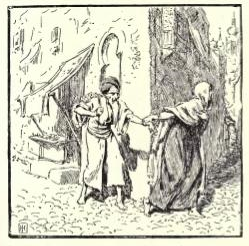
Folk stories like "Ali Baba and the Forty Thieves" (pictured) inspired Madonna to write the book

In 2003, Madonna signed a contract with Callaway Arts & Entertainment for a series of five children's books. She explained that each book dealt "with issues that all children confront... Hopefully there is a lesson that will help kids turn painful or scary situations into learning experiences". The first three releases were The English Roses (September 2003), Mr. Peabody's Apples (November 2003), and Yakov and the Seven Thieves (June 2004). All three charted on The New York Times Best Seller list. Cumulatively, the three books sold over 1.5 million copies worldwide. Callaway announced that the fourth book in the series, The Adventures of Abdi, would be released on November 8, 2004.

Like her previous releases, Madonna was again inspired by a 300-year-old story by rabbi Baal Shem Tov that she had heard from her Kabbalah teacher, and wanted to share the "essence" of it. "The power of certainty is without limits", the singer wrote in the preface, referencing a line uttered by the character Eli to Abdi. In an interview with The Times, Madonna explained that she was inspired by the settings in "Ali Baba and the Forty Thieves" and other folk stories from One Thousand and One Nights, and wanted to create something in that genre. She included the Kabbalistic principle of certainty in the story with the idea that one can "overcome all obstacles and challenges in our lives if we perceive them as blessings and not curses; if we accept that they have arrived in our lives to teach us something valuable".

The Adventures of Abdi was published in a 32-page jacketed hardcover format. Madonna collaborated with Russian illustrators Olga Dugina and Andrej Dugin, who created the images for The Adventures of Abdi. This was the first time they worked with a contemporary writer and it presented them "with several artistic possibilities—to show a desert, a palace, a small house where an old man was making jewelry". The couple took almost four months to finish the illustrations. They first decided on the "most interesting" portions of the story and gathered research materials from libraries and museums. They created rough sketches based on them; Andrej did the drawings while Olga painted them. The couple's favorite illustration was showing the queen trying out the necklace since they could show "a lot of strange characters. We could tell the story that was not told, and hint at something much broader than the text itself". The image for the book cover was the last painting finished by them.

== Publication and reception ==
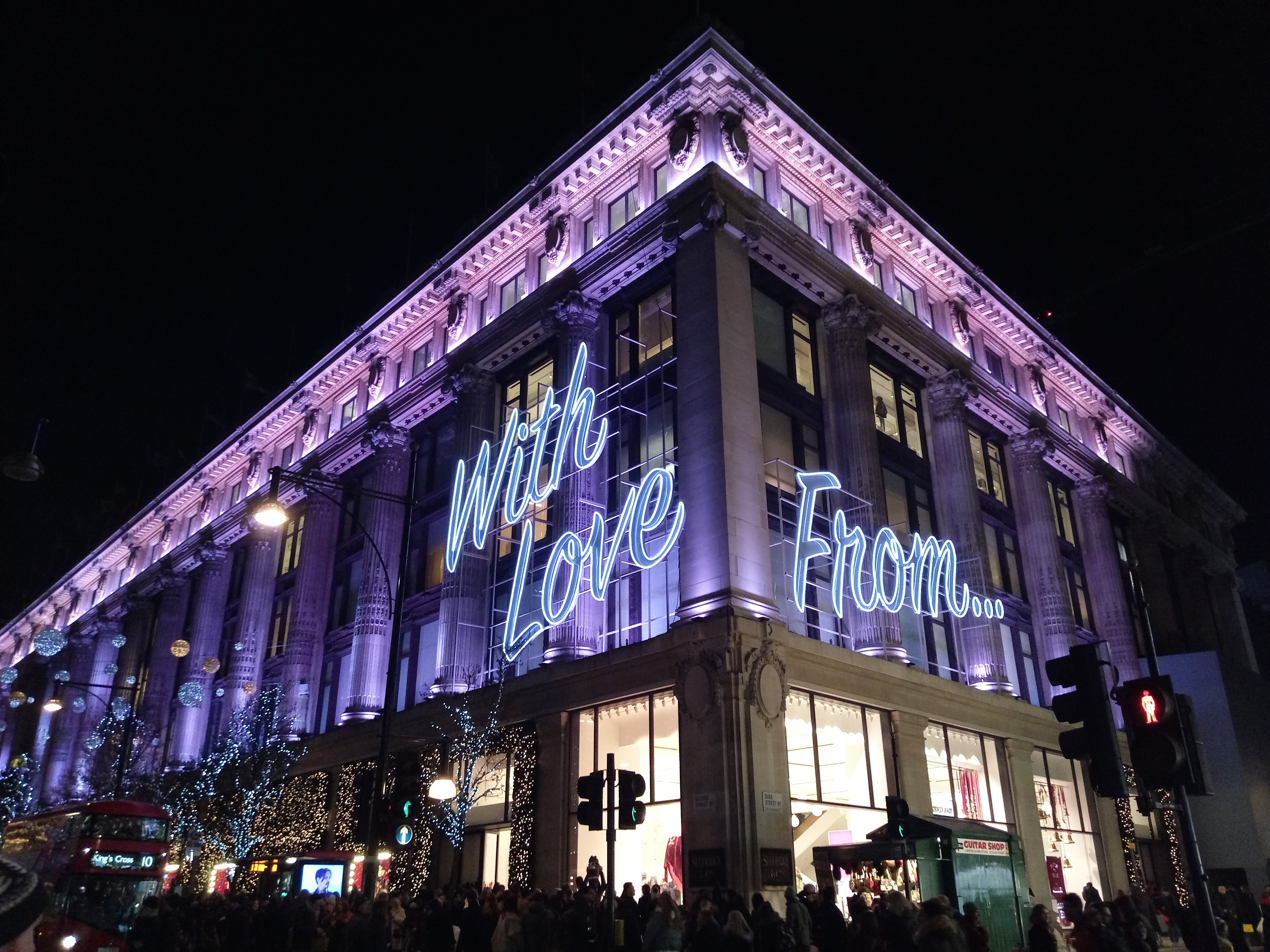
Selfridges, Oxford Street in London, where Madonna appeared to promote the release

Following the release of The Adventures of Abdi, Madonna made a number of promotional appearances. On November 12, 2004, the singer appeared at Selfridges, Oxford Street in London for a book-signing event. Only 250 of the fans queued up were chosen to get inside. Madonna read aloud from the book for thirty minutes, watched by thirty schoolchildren in audience. She appeared on British television chat show Richard & Judy, where she spoke about the inspiration and her writing process of the book, followed by The Jeremy Vine Show. Madonna was interviewed by Pat O'Brien from The Insider on November 11, and she spoke about writing the book as a means for "giving children some kind of tools to deal with adversity in their life in a peaceful way". In December, Madonna promoted the book on the CBBC show Blue Peter.

Publishers Weekly criticized The Adventures of Abdi for being Orientalist as it depicts "a cobra-bodied man play[ing] a flute [while] dark-skinned dwarves assist the milky-skinned queen and a gazelle sports a turbaned person's head". The writer believed that some readers could be troubled by its "harem-chic depiction of an exotic Middle East" and simplistic philosophy. The illustrations received positive feedback, with the reviewer calling them "sumptuous" and a mix between the paintings of Michelangelo and Hieronymus Bosch. Author Sandra L. Beckett complimented the illustrations in her book, Crossover Picturebooks: A Genre for All Ages. She described the images as "intricately detailed, richly textured" and believed it evoked the work of past artisans and masters. The book faced negative reaction from religious groups who believed that it was forcing children into accepting teachings of Kabbalah. Religious cult expert Rick Alan Ross opposed the release, saying it was just "more Kabbalah preaching disguised as a kiddie book... It's just pushing Kabbalah down the throats of innocent children'."

== See also ==
- Madonna bibliography
