= Lotsa de Casha =

Book by Madonna

- Book cover with artwork by Rui Paes
- Author: Madonna
- Illustrator: Rui Paes
- Cover artist: Rui Paes
- Subject: Moral; fairy tale
- Genre: Children's literature
- Publisher: Callaway
- Publication date: June 7, 2005
- Publication place: United States
- Media type: Print; audio book
- Pages: 48
- ISBN: 978-0-670-05888-4
- OCLC: 58843456
- LC Class: PZ7.M26573

Lotsa de Casha is a picture book written by American entertainer Madonna. It was released on June 7, 2005, by Callaway Arts & Entertainment. The book was written for readers aged six and up. The book's titular character is an Italian greyhound who learns the moral "money can't buy happiness". Madonna drew from her life when writing the story, from denouncing materialism to her motherhood. Portuguese artist Rui Paes illustrated the book, and modeled his illustrations on Renaissance and Baroque painting, and the works of painter Caravaggio.

Callaway hosted a party for the book release at New York's Bergdorf Goodman store, where Madonna read the story aloud. She also made promotional appearances on television talk shows and gave magazine interviews. Lotsa de Casha debuted at number three on The New York Times Best Seller list. It received mixed reviews from book critics, who found some humor in the story, but felt it did not gel with Paes' illustrations, which received positive feedback.

== Synopsis ==
In a distant land lived a wealthy merchant called Lotsa de Casha. He had everything money could buy, however Lotsa was still unhappy. So he sought out the opinion of all the well-known doctors of the land regarding his misery, but failed to find an answer. One day, his driver told him about a wise old man who lived faraway in an ancient city. Lotsa travels to the wise man who explained that the secret to his happiness was in sharing his wealth with others and putting them before himself. Lotsa was stunned since he had always put forth his own needs first, and became skeptical about the man's words.

While exploring the ancient city, Lotsa saw a man slogging to change the wheel of his car by himself. But Lotsa did not stop to help and continued walking. He soon got lost and was robbed by two thieves who left him penniless. A distraught Lotsa cried for help to a passing driver and realized it was the same man he had seen earlier. The man, who called himself Mister Forfilla, agreed to give him a ride back to his house, but in exchange Lotsa had to work for him. Throughout their journey Forfilla ordered Lotsa de Casha to transport an assortment of things—including chairs, tables, clothing—to people's homes, who all appreciated the gifts. Forfilla explained Lotsa the same thing as the wise man, that sharing his wealth was the key to happiness.

One night as he was driving the carriage, Lotsa was able to put someone else's need before his own by giving his blanket to a beggar who needed it. They finally reached Lotsa's palace and Forfilla confessed that it was his old home before Lotsa had bought it. Lotsa invited Forfilla inside for lunch, being a changed man now.

== Background and writing ==
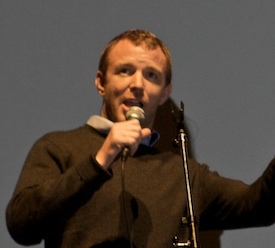
Madonna dedicated Lotsa de Casha to her then-husband Guy Ritchie.

In 2003, Madonna signed a contract with Callaway Arts & Entertainment for a series of five children's books. She explained that each book dealt "with issues that all children confront... Hopefully there is a lesson that will help kids turn painful or scary situations into learning experiences". During the promotion of the fourth book in the series, The Adventures of Abdi, Callaway announced the plans of publishing the fifth and final book titled Lotsa de Casha. The press release stated that the characters will be portrayed as animals with the central character, Lotsa de Casha, shown as an Italian greyhound in the style of Aesop's Fables. It was written for readers aged six and up with the moral that "money can't buy happiness". Madonna herself described Lotsa de Casha "as a story that claims that we can all resist selfishness and do something good for ourselves and for others". She confirmed that all profits gained from the sales of the book would be donated to charity.

With Grazia magazine, Madonna explained that writing Lotsa de Casha was ironic since she felt it was a "parable of her life". The story reflected her own journey from being labeled a "material girl" to being a mother. Like the titular character—described by the Associated Press as "a wealthy Scroogelike greyhound"—the singer felt that she had changed from being materialistic. "I spent 15 years of my life thinking about myself, thinking about everything from the point of view of: 'What is in it for me?'," Madonna pondered. Accepting herself as someone "privileged", she realized that "ultimately material things won't bring you happiness. Most very wealthy people are not happy. Why? They have too much of something they don't need, and they don't share it with other people." Lotsa de Casha was dedicated to her then-husband Guy Ritchie since he inspired her.

== Design and illustrations ==
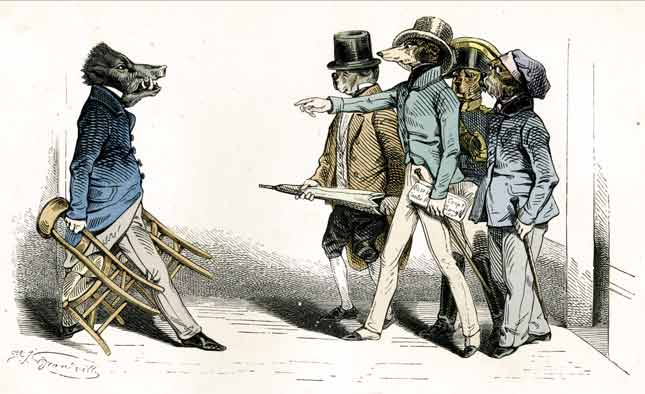
J. J. Grandville's cartoons inspired illustrator Rui Paes' sketches.

According to Communication Arts, the calligraphy of the book was done by Julian Waters with Japanese novelist Toshiya Masuda as the art director and Krupa Jhaveri as the book designer. The images were illustrated by Portuguese painter Rui Paes, who was contacted by Callaway after seeing his painting in The New York Times Magazine of a Singerie in Norway. Having established that he would maintain the secrecy of the project, Callaway sent him the story-draft, based on which Paes developed a small batch of sketches. Among them were cartoon-like paintings based on anthropomorphic animals by French caricaturist J. J. Grandville. The publishers liked them and the idea of the main characters depicted as animals were carried on for the book.

Paes sketched various aspect of the characters which helped him in understanding the different nuances the story presented. It took him almost two years to finish the illustrations with the majority of the work being accomplished in the final twelve months. Paes worked 12–14 hours per day uninterruptedly everyday which resulted him getting back pain and Callaway sending him an Aeron chair to aid him. Madonna worked closely with Paes, supplying him the material to be included in the book. She suggested he should travel to Siena and Rome for inspiration, and sent him drawings by her children for inclusion. The artist researched on Renaissance and Baroque painting for further inspiration, including the works of painter Caravaggio. Paes recalled the singer became the inspiration for the image of the wise old man's wife in the story. The animal characters were given as much human qualities and emotions as possible, with hand and body expressions to convey. Paes removed two images from the final illustrations, feeling they were inadequate.

== Publication and reception ==
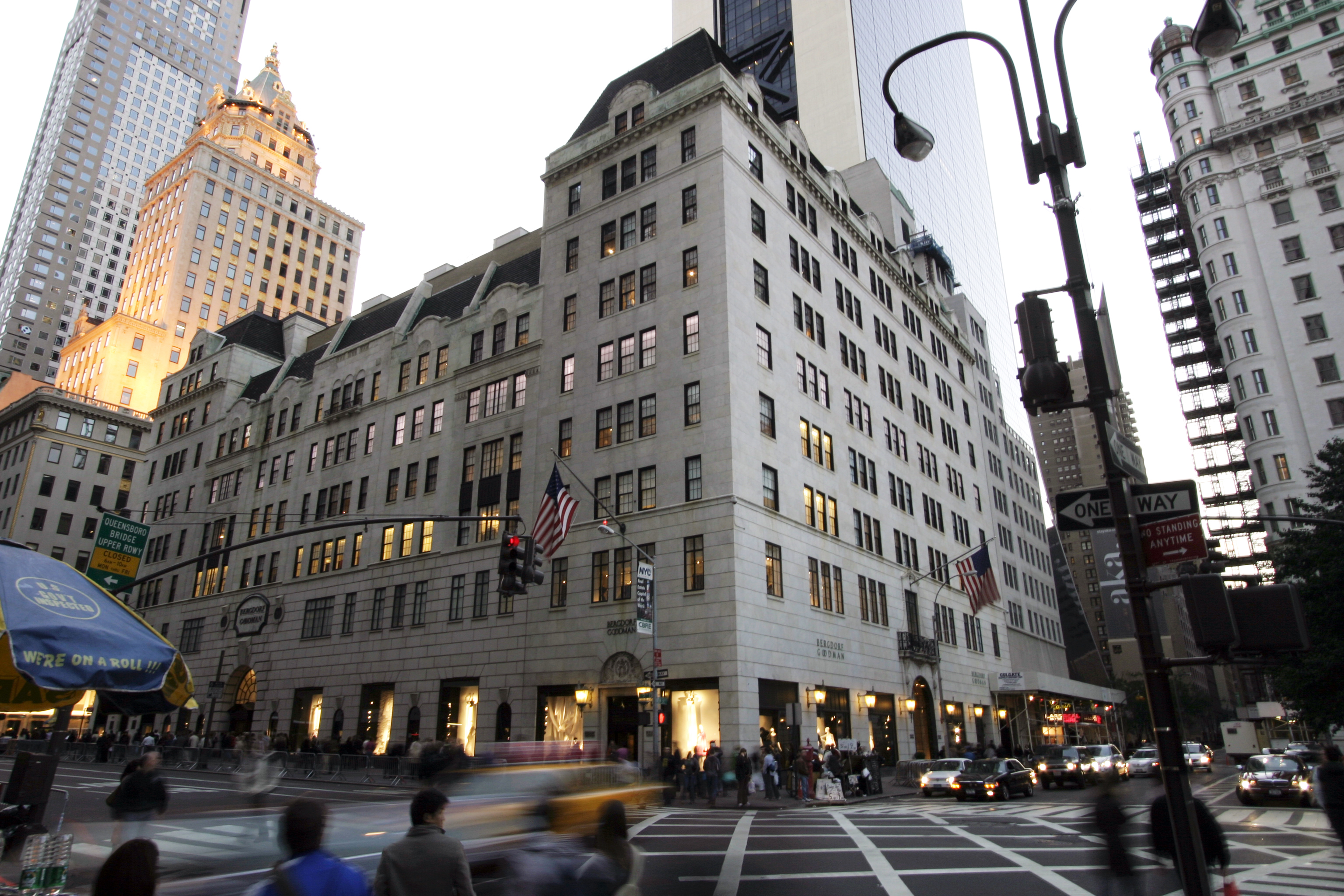
The book release party was held at New York's Bergdorf Goodman store.

The book was released on June 7, 2005, at a party hosted by retailer Bergdorf Goodman at New York's Fifth Avenue. It was attended by socialites and artists with signed copies of Lotsa de Casha available to purchase for $75, proceedings going to UNICEF. Attendees were dressed up in 18th century garments, depicting characters from the book. According to Reuters, the book reading at Bergdorf Goodman "drew puzzled responses from the group of about 25 kids, who appeared to have difficulty grasping the book's morals". Other promotions included book signing at Borders Time Warner Center and reading sessions at New York libraries. The singer read out to the students of Saint Ann's School from Brooklyn Heights, and handed out autographed copies. Tatiana Delgiannakis from New York Post noted that Madonna employed an Italian accent while reading aloud Lotsa's parts. Madonna appeared on NBC's Today show and ABC's The View to talk about the book, and gave interview in Ladies' Home Journal magazine for its July 2005 issue.

Lotsa de Casha debuted at number three on The New York Times Best Seller list. Elaine Stuart from Parenting found humor in the names Madonna gave in the book, like naming Lotsa's castle as "Flasha de Casa" and the mountain on which it is situated as the "Muchadougha Mountains", details she believed would make the readers laugh. Roy Blatchford from Books for Keeps liked the story and rated it four-out-of-five stars. He said that the story avoided any cliche plots, "creates a number of original cameos and bounces along with humour and lively dialogue, clearly influenced by [Madonna]'s Italian New York background." Blatchford complimented Paes' images describing them as "striking" and the design as "eye-catching" thus making Lotsa de Casha "a first-class picture book to grace any library". A review in Publishers Weekly called the story as "artless fable" but believed that Paes' illustrations improved it with the "tongue-in-cheek homage to classic Baroque painting". The reviewer found that in contrast to the grand images, the story appeared simple and the accented edge on Lotsa's words were "uncharacteristic of a rich gentleman". Delgiannakis complimented the "beautifully illustrated" images in the book but found it to be littered with "preachy factoids" like "Just because something is expensive, doesn’t mean it's worth it". Boyd Tonkin from The Independent panned the release, calling it "howlingly egotistical" and a vehicle of "personal gratification" for Madonna, "rather than a virtue in itself". Ilene Cooper of Booklist said that like many other celebrities-turned-authors, Madonna mistakenly thought that she could write books for children.
