= Of Thee I Sing (disambiguation) =

Of Thee I Sing is a phrase from the American patriotic song My Country, 'Tis of Thee (also known as "America"). The phrase may also refer to:

- Of Thee I Sing, a musical by George and Ira Gershwin.
  - Of Thee I Sing (song), a song from the musical.
- Of Thee I Sing (book), a children's book by Barack Obama.
- Of Thee I Sing (poetry book), a book of poems by Timothy Liu.
