= Yakov and the Seven Thieves =

Picture book by Madonna

- Book cover for Yakov and the Seven Thieves
- Author: Madonna
- Illustrator: Gennady Spirin
- Cover artist: Gennady Spirin
- Subject: Moral
- Genre: Children's literature
- Set in: 18th century
- Publisher: Callaway
- Publication date: June 21, 2004
- Publication place: United States
- Media type: Print; Audio book
- Pages: 32
- ISBN: 978-0-670-05887-7
- OCLC: 54852649
- LC Class: PZ7.M26573

Yakov and the Seven Thieves is a picture book written by American entertainer Madonna. It was released on June 21, 2004, by Callaway Arts & Entertainment in over 110 countries and 38 different languages, including a Braille edition. The book contains a moral tale and was inspired by a 300-year-old story by rabbi Baal Shem Tov, that Madonna had heard from her Kabbalah teacher. The premise was set in a small, 18th century town in Eastern Europe, and the story talks about how everyone has the ability to open the gates of heaven, however unworthy one is deemed to be.

The cover art and the images inside were painted by Russian illustrator Gennady Spirin who chose Baroque painting as inspiration for crafting the characters and the scenery. Like her previous endeavors, Madonna promoted the release by appearing on talk show and reading to children at a hospital in London. Critics gave mixed reviews of the book, with reviews being mostly negative about Madonna's writing but praised Spirin's illustrations. Three weeks after its release, Yakov and the Seven Thieves debuted at number seven on The New York Times Best Seller list in the category for Children's Picture books.

== Synopsis ==
A cobbler called Yakov and his wife Olga are frightened that their gravely ill son Mikhail is dying. They hear about a man of healing who lives in the last house of their village and Yakov goes to him for guidance. The man refuses Yakov's money, instead clarifies that if he can save Yakov's son, the cobbler can repay by making a pair of shoes for his grandson.

The next day, Yakov visited the man only to be told that when he had prayed, the gates of heaven would not open. The distressed cobbler begged him to try yet one more time. The healer asked his grandson to go into the village and find all the thieves, pickpockets and criminals, and bring them back to the house. They included the thieves Vladimir the Villain who could bend metal and punch holes through stones, Boris the Barefoot Midget who snatched the purse of old ladies, Ivan the Arsonist, Petra the Pickpocket, Stinky Pasha, Sadko the Snake, Igor the Tiger, all of them being a large host of ne'er-do-wells.

With the healer's direction, the thieves all got on their knees and started to pray. A miracle occurred and the prayers of the men, who previously robbed by opening gates, helped to open the gates of heaven and Yakov's son was healed. The next day, Yakov came with a new pair of shoes for the grandson and declared that Mikhail was alive and well. It was the prayers of the gang of crooks that made a difference.

Obvious cultural references for Russian readers and classical music fans
Name	Opera title and/or composer, or other references
Sadko the Snake	Sadko by Nikolai Rimsky-Korsakov (the Dragon)
Igor the Tiger	Prince Igor by Alexander Borodin (the Snake)
Boris the Barefoot Midget	Boris Godunov by Modest Mussorgsky (the Pig)
Ivan the Arsonist	Ivan Susanin by Mikhail Glinka (the Rat)
Petra the Pickpocket	Peter Tchaikovsky (the Rat)
Vladimir the Villain	Vladimir the Great
Stinky Pasha	diminutive from 'Pavel': Paul I of Russia (the Dog)

== Background and development ==
In 2003, American singer Madonna signed a contract with Callaway Arts & Entertainment for a series of five children's books. She explained that each book dealt "with issues that all children confront... Hopefully there is a lesson that will help kids turn painful or scary situations into learning experiences". The first two releases were The English Roses (September 2003), and Mr. Peabody's Apples (November 2003). Both debuted at number one on The New York Times Best Seller list. Joe D'Angelo from MTV News confirmed that the third book would be titled Yakov and the Seven Thieves. Madonna was again inspired by a 300-year-old story by rabbi Baal Shem Tov that she had heard from her Kabbalah teacher, and wanted to share the "essence" of it. "We must never forget that hidden behind a large amount of darkness is a large amount of light," the singer wrote in the preface. According to the press release, the premise was set in a small, 18th century town in Eastern Europe and was written for readers aged six and up, with the book manufactured in a 32-page jacketed hardcover.

The initial release date for Yakov and the Seven Thieves was set for April 2004, but publisher Nicholas Callaway confirmed that the book would be released on June 21, 2004, in over 110 countries and 38 different languages, including a Braille edition. Although Callaway published it, the release was distributed through 42 agencies, including Gallimard Jeunesse in France, Penguin Books in the United Kingdom and the United States, and Hanser Verlag in Germany. Madonna promoted the book by appearing on ABC News on June 16, 2004, where she dedicated the release to "naughty children everywhere" and spoke about the power of praying according to her. While on the Re-Invention World Tour of 2004, Madonna visited London's Great Ormond Street Hospital, where her daughter Lourdes read an excerpt from the book to a group of ailing children.

The cover art and the images inside were painted by Russian illustrator Gennady Spirin. This was Spirin's first time working with a contemporary author and story, and was initially uncomfortable with the mayhem surrounding Madonna. He clarified that the ideas given to him were "clear" and "style parameters were set", which resulted in crafting the characters "amazingly quickly". Since the story was set in 18th century Europe, Spirin chose Baroque painting as inspiration since it made the book "dressier, but at the same time preserves the dramatic element and the psychological characteristics of each of the characters".

== Critical and commercial reception ==
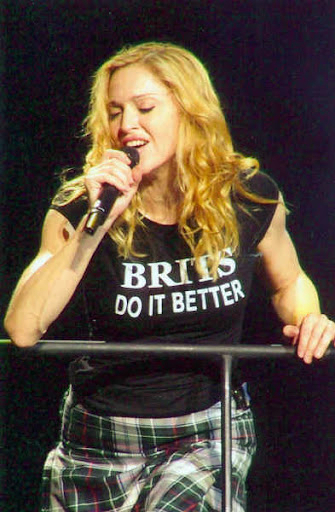
While on the Re-Invention World Tour (pictured), Madonna appeared at Great Ormond Street Hospital for a reading session from the book.

Three weeks after its release, Yakov and the Seven Thieves debuted at number seven on The New York Times Best Seller list in the category for Children's Picture books. The sales fell drastically, as observed by Edward Wyatt from The New York Times, and it sold just 27,000 copies according to Nielsen BookScan. This was much less from the 321,000 copies sold of The English Roses and the 127,000 copies of Mr. Peabody's Apples.

Positive review came from The Des Moines Register with critic Maria Sudekum Fisher complimenting the "redemption arc" of the storyline. The Children's BBC did not find any "weak bits" in the book and listed the introduction of the thieves as well as the illustrations as highlight. Canada.com found Yakov to be the best among Madonna's three released books, feeling that "the story moves along nicely and gets its message about redemption across without being too preachy. it's also appropriately written for its target audience". An article in The Economist felt that had any unknown author released Yakov and the Seven Thieves, it would not have received much promotion. The review noted that the message in the story was distinct, describing it as "a more overtly religious message than is normally encountered in children's picture books" and found the moral as "purely medieval Catholicism". The critic added that "for all the ecumenical confusion, the message is heartfelt and the delivery straightforward. [Madonna] has a vivid and direct writing style—presumably the product of two decades of song-writing experience."

The Publishers Weekly complimented Spirin's illustrations and Madonna's comic writing while describing the seven thieves, but criticized her "soapbox approach" in telling a witty story. The review also noted Spirin adding minute details to the images, including "the smallest features of 18th-century European town life: cobbler's nails, brass drawer-pulls, feather pens, children's toys". Deirdre Donahue from USA Today also complimented Spirin's paintings, but was critical of the story, calling it "dreary and inappropriate" as well as "lackluster and verbose". She criticized the fact that Spirin's name was not present on the book cover art and felt that Yakov and the Seven Thieves was the "worst" of Madonna's three published children's books. "Dying children, prayers, criminals praying to open the gates of heaven. It's positively Grimm. Yakov will either bore or frighten children," Donahue concluded. Tim Adams from The Observer compared the release to the work of Hans Christian Andersen, but added that the "triteness of the story and the easiness of the moralising is more than redeemed by the excellence of the illustrations".

Reviewing the book for Tablet, Ayelet Waldman found the moral of the story as "unsatisfying and somehow ill-constructed", as well as "half-baked". She complimented Spirin's paintings describing them as "complex and multilayered" like Renaissance paintings, but found it odd that the renderings were not Jewish, and instead the illustrator gave a Tudor town. Waldman believed that Yakov and the Seven Thieves would become "a staple of Hanukkah gift-giving. It's a muddled and simplistic story [...] but the illustrations are lovely and the title sounds like those of all the other boring Jewish storybooks." Jane Doonan from Times Educational Supplement listed the artwork as the "best reason" for buying the book, since she felt that the "internal logic of the story doesn't bear inspection, and the mawkishness and moralising is unappealing".

== Release history ==
Region	Date	Format	Publisher	Ref.
United States	June 21, 2004	Hardcover	Callaway	
United States	June 21, 2004	Paperback	Callaway	
Spain	June 21, 2004	Hardcover	Scholastic	
Worldwide	June 23, 2004	Audio book	Callaway/Puffin	
