= Loren Long =

American children's book author and illustrator

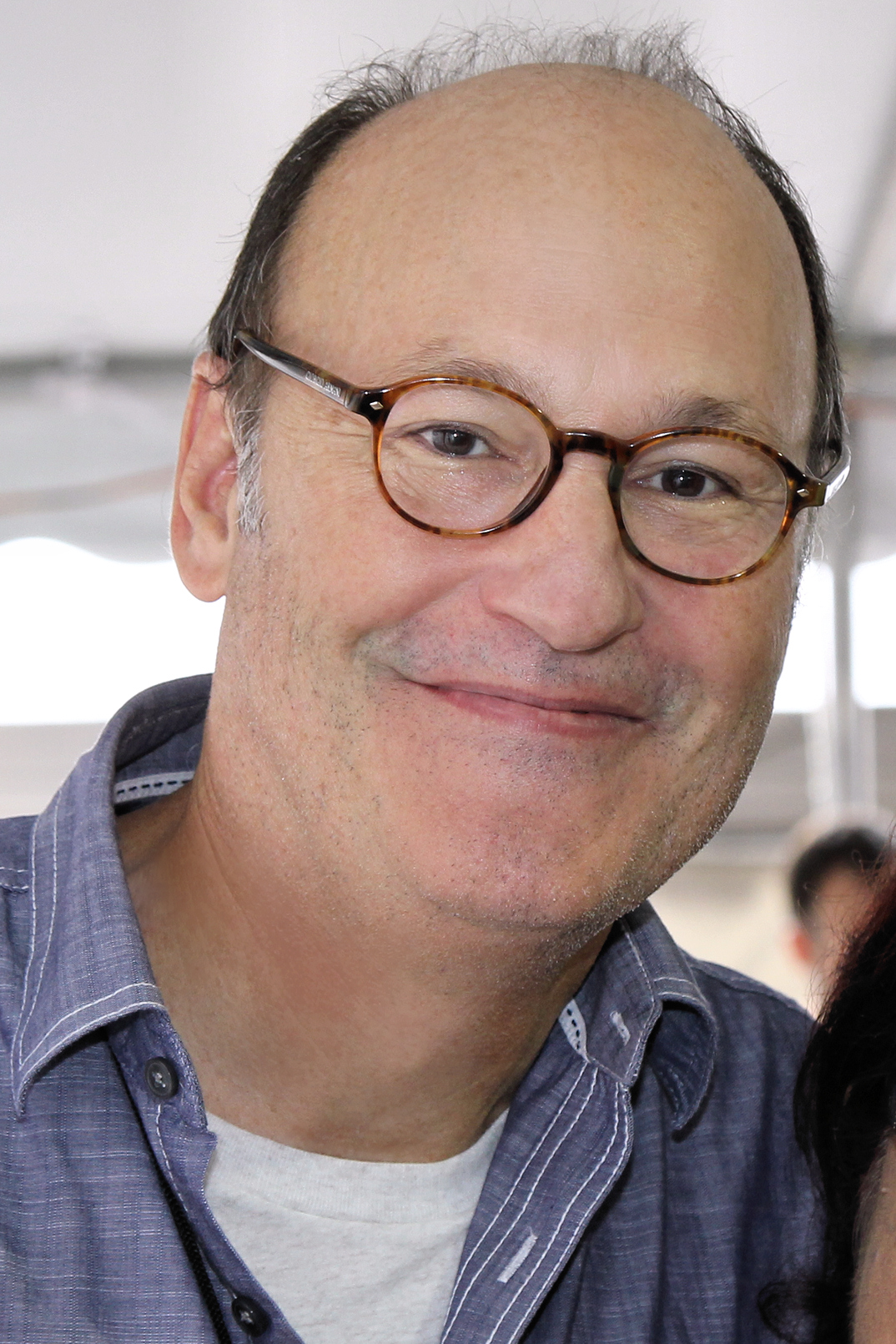
- Long at the 2017 Texas Book Festival
- Born: 1964 (age 61–62); Joplin, Missouri, SA
- Occupations: Illustrator, writer
- Writing career
- Period: c. 2000–present
- Genre: Children's picture books
- Website: lorenlong.com

Loren Long (born 1964) is an American author of children's books best known for illustration. He won the Society of Children's Book Writers and Illustrators' (SCBWI) Golden Kite Award for picture book illustration in 2004 for I Dream of Trains by Angela Johnson.

== Biography ==
Long was born in Joplin, Missouri. He graduated from University of Kentucky, with a BA in Graphic Design. He lives in Cincinnati, Ohio with his wife and two sons.

His career began at Gibson Greeting Cards in Cincinnati, Ohio eventually moving on to freelance illustration which gave him national exposure for children's books illustrations. A Simon & Schuster executive saw his work for Miles’ Song by Alice McGill and tapped him for the illustrations for I Dream of Trains by Angela Johnson. In 2004, I Dream of Trains won the Golden Kite Award for Picture Book Illustration. In 2005, he was a Golden Kite Award Honoree for his illustrations in When I Heard the Learn’d Astronomer by Walt Whitman. In 2010, he illustrated Of Thee I Sing: A Letter to My Daughters by Barack Obama.

When he was 12 years old, he learned that he was colorblind. In his work, he relies on strong lighting sources, color theory, and support from his family to overcome this obstacle.

== Selected works ==
Year	Title	Writer	Publisher	ISBN
2000	My Dog, My Hero	Betsy Byars		
2002	The Wonders of Donal O’Donnell	Gary D. Schmidt		
2003	The Day the Animals Came: The Story of Saint Francis Day	Frances Weller		
2003	I Dream of Trains	Angela Johnson		ISBN 0-689-82609-5
2003	Mr. Peabody's Apples	Madonna	Callaway	ISBN 0-689-82609-5
2003	I Dream of Trains	Angela Johnson		
2004	When I Heard the Learn’d Astronomer	Walt Whitman		
2005	The Little Engine That Could	Watty Piper		
2007	Wind Flyers	Angela Johnson		ISBN 0-689-84879-X
2007	Barnstormers Game 1	Phil Bildner		ISBN 1-4169-1863-9
2007	Barnstormers Game 2	Phil Bildner		ISBN 1-4169-1864-7
2007	Angela and the Baby Jesus	Frank McCourt	Scribner	
2009	Otis	Loren Long	Philomel Books	ISBN 978-0-399-25248-8
2010	Of Thee I Sing: A Letter to My Daughters	Barack Obama	Knopf Books for Young Readers	ISBN 978-0-399-16397-5
2015	Little Tree	Loren Long	Philomel Books	ISBN 978-0-375-83527-8
2018	Love	Matt de la Peña	Penguin Random House	
2018	There's a Hole in the Log on the Bottom of the Lake	Loren Long	Penguin Random House	
2024	The Yellow Bus	Loren Long	Roaring Brook Press	
