= Lisa Holton =

American writer, editor and producer

Lisa Holton is an American writer, editor and author. She is a former Business Editor of the Chicago Sun-Times and has authored or edited 15 nonfiction books and ebooks including Business Valuation for Dummies (with Jim Bates) and For Members Only: A History and Guide to Chicago's Oldest Private Clubs. She has corporate, nonprofit and editorial clients.
