= Rui Paes =

British painter

- Born: 1957 (age 68–69); Pemba, Mozambique
- Occupation: Painter

Rui Paes (born 1957 in Pemba, Mozambique) is a painter, illustrator and muralist, residing in the UK.

== Career ==
Paes completed a degree in Painting in 1981 at the Escola de Belas Artes do Porto and was awarded the Newcomers Prize at the Arús National Exhibition of Modern Art in 1982. He completed a Master of Arts in Painting at the Royal College of Art, London, in 1988, under a scholarship from The Gulbenkian Foundation, Lisbon (Portugal) and a grant from the Beal Foundation, Boston (USA).

Alongside his studio work Rui Paes painted murals in various countries around the world, including Egypt, Germany, Portugal, Norway, France and the United Kingdom.

Paes illustrated eight books, including the children's book Lotsa de Casha by Madonna which was published in 40 languages in over 100 countries and made the Top 10 New York Times Best Seller List.

Between 1985 and 1990, the years the painter himself calls his Brutalist Period his palette became very restricted, bereft, basically reduced to the colour red which subsequently matured into the pigment Caput Mortuum. In Britain and the US, these very large minimal paintings with their vessel like structures and raw aesthetics found the support of art benefactors and collectors Bruce A. Beal (Boston, Mass.), John Studzinski (CBE) and Peter and Maria Kellner. In Portugal two architects showed particular and effective support: Fernando Távora and Eduardo Souto de Moura.

In 2008 Rui Paes was the Creator, General Curator and co-organizer of the exhibition "Looking at Picasso - Picasso and Portuguese Art of the 20th Century" which took place in Portimão in Portugal and included a show of photographs by Lee Miller entitled "Lee Miller & Picasso". "Looking at Picasso - Picasso and Portuguese Art of the 20th Century" became the blueprint for the exhibition "Picasso & Modern British Art" which took place at Tate Britain and the Scottish National Gallery of Modern Art, in 2012.

Paes has had 13 solo exhibitions and has taken part in numerous group shows. His work is represented in Japan, the Middle East, Africa, Europe and the United States.

== Solo exhibitions ==
- "Ausência e Desejo / Absence and Desire" ÁRVORE Coop., Porto, Portugal (2010).
- "Dar Voz à Poesia / Giving a Voice to Poetry" Centro de Arte de Ovar, Ovar, Portugal (2009).
- "Lotsa de Casha" Chipping Norton Theatre, UK (2007).
- "Billie Bargeld" Neue Theatre Espelkamp, Espelkamp, Germany (2007).
- "Pipas de Massa" Teatro Nacional de S. Carlos, Lisboa, Portugal (2006).
- "A Procissão / The Procession" DARIO RAMOS Gallery, Porto, Portugal (1998).
- "Pintura sobre Papel" Galeria da Universidade de Braga, Braga, Portugal (1992).
- "Cruzes / Crosses" ATLANTICA Gallery, Porto, Portugal (1992).
- "Works on Paper" Lilian Baylis Theatre, London, UK (1990).
- MODULO Gallery, Lisbon, Portugal (1989).
- MODULO Gallery, Porto, Portugal (1989).
- GILDE Gallery, Guimarães, Portugal (1985).
- "Um Segredo / A Secret" DIAGONAL Gallery (Sponsored by the Portuguese Ministry of Culture), Cascais, Portugal (1983).
