= Kristen Ashburn =

American photojournalist

Kristen Ashburn is an American photojournalist. She is best known for her work photographing the impact of AIDS in southern Africa.

Ashburn is based in New York City and Miami, where she resides with her husband and daughter.

== Early life and education ==
Kristen Ashburn was born in 1973 in King of Prussia, Pennsylvania, US.

Ashburn studied photography at Rochester Institute of Photography and New York University Tisch School of the Arts. During her college career, Ashburn traveled to Romania five times to work with neurologically impaired orphans. In 1997, she created and became the first chairperson of the American Chapter of the Romanian Challenge Appeal.

== Career ==
Ashburn has produced stories on the spread of tuberculosis (TB) in the Russian penal system, Jewish settlers and suicide bombers in Israel’s Occupied Territories, the aftermath of the tsunami in Sri Lanka, and Hurricane Katrina in New Orleans.

She primarily does black-and-white portrait photography, most often taken indoors. Such portraits taken in south Africa include an image of Chitungwiza gravediggers working on eight graves simultaneously in an already crowded cemetery, and of people present at a burial for people who had died from AIDS during its pandemic in the area.

Ashburn has made four documentaries about the issues created by AIDS in Zimbabwe.

In 2007, Ashburn worked as a consulting producer on the documentary film I Am Because We Are, which was produced and written by Madonna. The documentary follows orphans in Malawi who have lost their parents due to HIV and AIDS. An estimated 500,000 children have lost their parents to these diseases. Also shown in the film are efforts to improve the children’s lives and condition by Raising Malawi, a charity organization created by Madonna.

Ashburn has been a Wedding Photojournalist Association (WPJA) judge since 2008.

Her work has appeared in The New Yorker, Time, Newsweek, Life, Vanity Fair, U.S. News World Report, Los Angeles Times, Mother Jones magazine, The Telegraph Sunday Magazine, and Rolling Stone. Some of these include “The African scourge,” an article published in the Los Angeles Times in 2006 about Ashburn’s work with African people infected with HIV and the creation of her exhibit Bloodline, and “On Their Own,” published in Mother Jones in 2003 about the effect of AIDS in Zimbabwe.

=== Projects ===
Ashburn is one of the directors of Through the Eyes of Children: The Rwanda Project, a nonprofit organization that teaches photography to vulnerable children and helps them to share their perspectives with the world. The organization does so through workshops hosted in a variety of locations, most often in Rwanda. They have also had them in New Jersey, Boston, Haiti and Nepal.

The project was created by photographer David Jiranek in 2000 as a way to aid orphans of the 1994 Rwandan genocide. Kristen Ashburn joined the organization in the Spring of 2001 to help teach annual photo workshops, edit photographs, craft exhibitions, launch the website, and create a way for the children’s photographs to generate revenue, which was used to pay for their education.

The most recent workshop was in Rwanda in September 2023.

Many of these workshops have been filmed for a documentary titled “Camera Kids” by Beth Murphy.

=== Publications ===
BLOODLINE: AIDS and Family, Published November 28th, 2006:

BLOODLINE: AIDS and Family is a short collection of photography and audio clips that documents the effects of the AIDS pandemic, specifically as it relates to members of the family unit. It includes a series of portraits of people of all ages and across Africa who have been affected. The work demonstrates the larger implications of the pandemic, including the threat to people’s livelihoods, increased amounts of poverty, and economic instability faced by the region.

"I Am Because We Are," Published January 15, 2009:

The book “I Am Because We Are” is a companion book to the film also titled I Am Because We Are. It is a volume of images of the eight children featured in the accompanying documentary and other photographs from Ashburn’s work in Malawi and Africa from the previous seven years of her work in those areas. The images aim to provide a more in-depth look into the children’s lives and the effects of the AIDS pandemic in southern Africa. Ashburn donates the proceeds from the sale of this volume to Raising Malawi.

=== Presentations ===
Ashburn was a TED speaker in October of 2008. The talk was titled “The face of AIDS in Africa,” and she discussed her work in her publication BLOODLINE: AIDS and Family.

On February 28, 2012, Kristen Ashburn spoke about her work at Drexel’s School of Public Health and College of Medicine. The lecture was titled “Global Health and Humanitarian Crises — A View of the World through the Lens of Kristen Ashburn.” In it, she discussed how her photographs showcase the dignity of people affected by health crises. Some of these crises included the poor conditions of an institution for mentally and physically challenged orphans in Romania whose staff were not properly educated on how to best treat the children, people with multi-drug-resistant tuberculosis in a Siberian prison, those affected by the AIDS epidemic in Zimbabwe, and people in Haiti recovering from the earthquake that hit the area in 2010. Each collection was black and white and focused on the people affected in these scenarios.

=== Impacts ===
Ashburn often raises money with her photographs to aid the people she documents and is qualified by some as an activist photographer.

Her work has been used to educate, such as in St. Michael’s College course “HIV/AIDS in East Africa,” where professors Jerald Swope and Patricia Siplon introduce their students to the material of the class with her “Bloodline: AIDS and Family” project. Swope and Siplon write that the information in the multimedia project covers the precise issue they plan to discuss in the course and provides a current media example of HIV/AIDS to their students.

== Awards ==
- 2003: Best of Photojournalism Award from National Press Photographers Association (NPPA) for Best Magazine News Picture Story
- 2003: Marty Forscher Fellowship for Humanistic Photography
- 2003: World Press Photo, 3rd prize in portraits, stories
- 2004: Canon Female Photojournalist Award/AFJ
- 2004: Thirty Emerging Photographers by Photo District News (PDN)
- 2005: World Press Photo, 1st prize in people in the news, singles
- 2006: Best of Photojournalism Award from National Press Photographers Association (NPPA)
- 2006: Getty Images Grant for Editorial Photography
- 2007: Best of Photojournalism Award from National Press Photographers Association (NPPA)
- 2007: Emmy Award nomination, for Bloodline: AIDS and Family multimedia project, produced by Mediastorm.org
- 2007: Pictures of the Year, Best Multimedia News Story or Essay, 2nd place, for “Bloodline,” for Photography, Video and Audio
- 2007: The John Faber Award of the Overseas Press Club of America for "The African Scourge," first published in The Los Angeles Times
