= Of Thee I Sing (book) =

Book by Barack Obama

- Author: Barack Obama
- Language: English
- Publisher: Knopf Books for Young Readers
- Publication date: November 16, 2010
- Publication place: United States
- Media type: Print (Hardcover)
- Pages: 40
- ISBN: 0-375-83527-X
- Preceded by: The Audacity of Hope

Of Thee I Sing: A Letter to My Daughters is a 2010 children's book by Barack Obama, with illustrations by Loren Long. It is described by the publisher as a "tribute to thirteen groundbreaking Americans and the ideals that have shaped our nation." The stories of thirteen Americans are told in the book: George Washington, Abraham Lincoln, Martin Luther King Jr., Neil Armstrong, Sitting Bull, Cesar Chavez, Billie Holiday, Maya Lin, Albert Einstein, Georgia O'Keeffe, Jackie Robinson, Helen Keller, and Jane Addams."

The proceeds from the sale of the book were donated to a scholarship fund for the children of fallen and disabled US service personnel. Obama finished writing the book in 2008, after he was elected but before taking office.
