= Mr. Peabody's Apples =

Book by Madonna

- Book cover for Mr. Peabody's Apples
- Author: Madonna
- Illustrator: Loren Long
- Cover artist: Loren Long
- Subject: Moral
- Genre: Children's literature
- Set in: 1949
- Publisher: Callaway
- Publication date: November 10, 2003
- Publication place: United States
- Media type: Print; Audio book
- Pages: 40
- ISBN: 978-0-670-05883-9
- OCLC: 62795988
- LC Class: PZ7.M26573

Mr. Peabody's Apples is a picture book written by American entertainer Madonna, released on November 10, 2003, by Callaway Arts & Entertainment. The book contains a moral tale, inspired by a 300-year-old story by Rabbi Baal Shem Tov, that Madonna had heard from her Kabbalah teacher. Its main protagonist, Mr. Peabody, is subjected to rumors spread by a young boy and teaches him a lesson. Mr. Peabody's Apples is illustrated by Loren Long who took inspiration from American regionalist painters, and modeled the characters after real-life people.

Mr. Peabody's Apples was released in over 150 countries and 36 languages worldwide. It was the second children's book authored by Madonna, following The English Roses. She partnered with Audible stores and Apple Music for promotion, and also appeared on US talk shows. Critics gave mostly negative reviews of the book, criticizing the storytelling and absence of joy in it. The book debuted at number one on The New York Times Best Seller list.

== Synopsis ==
History teacher Mr. Peabody organizes baseball games with other schools every Saturday. After each game, Mr. Peabody would clean up the field, with the help of a student named Billy Little. Then Mr. Peabody would walk home down the main street of Happville and pick out the shiniest apple from Mr. Funkadeli's market and put it in his pocket. One day, a student called Tommy Tittlebottom saw Mr. Peabody do this, and believed he was not paying for the apple. Tommy told his friends that Mr. Peabody was stealing the apples and gradually the word spread across town.

The following Saturday, Mr. Peabody wondered why no one showed up for the baseball game. Little Billy walked up to Mr. Peabody and told him everything. Mr. Peabody took Billy to Mr. Funkadeli's market where Billy realized that Mr. Peabody paid for the apples every Saturday morning when he picked up his milk. Astonished, Billy went to find Tommy and explained everything. Later that day, Tommy showed up at Mr. Peabody's house and apologized, asking how he could make it up to him. Mr. Peabody told Tommy to meet him at the bleachers with a feather pillow.

Later that day, Mr. Peabody had Tommy cut open the pillow at the top of the bleachers and let all the feathers fly away across the field. He asked Tommy to go and pick up the feathers which Tommy thought would be impossible. It was then Mr. Peabody reminded Tommy that it is impossible to undo the damage he had done spreading the rumor that Mr. Peabody was a thief.

== Background and conception ==
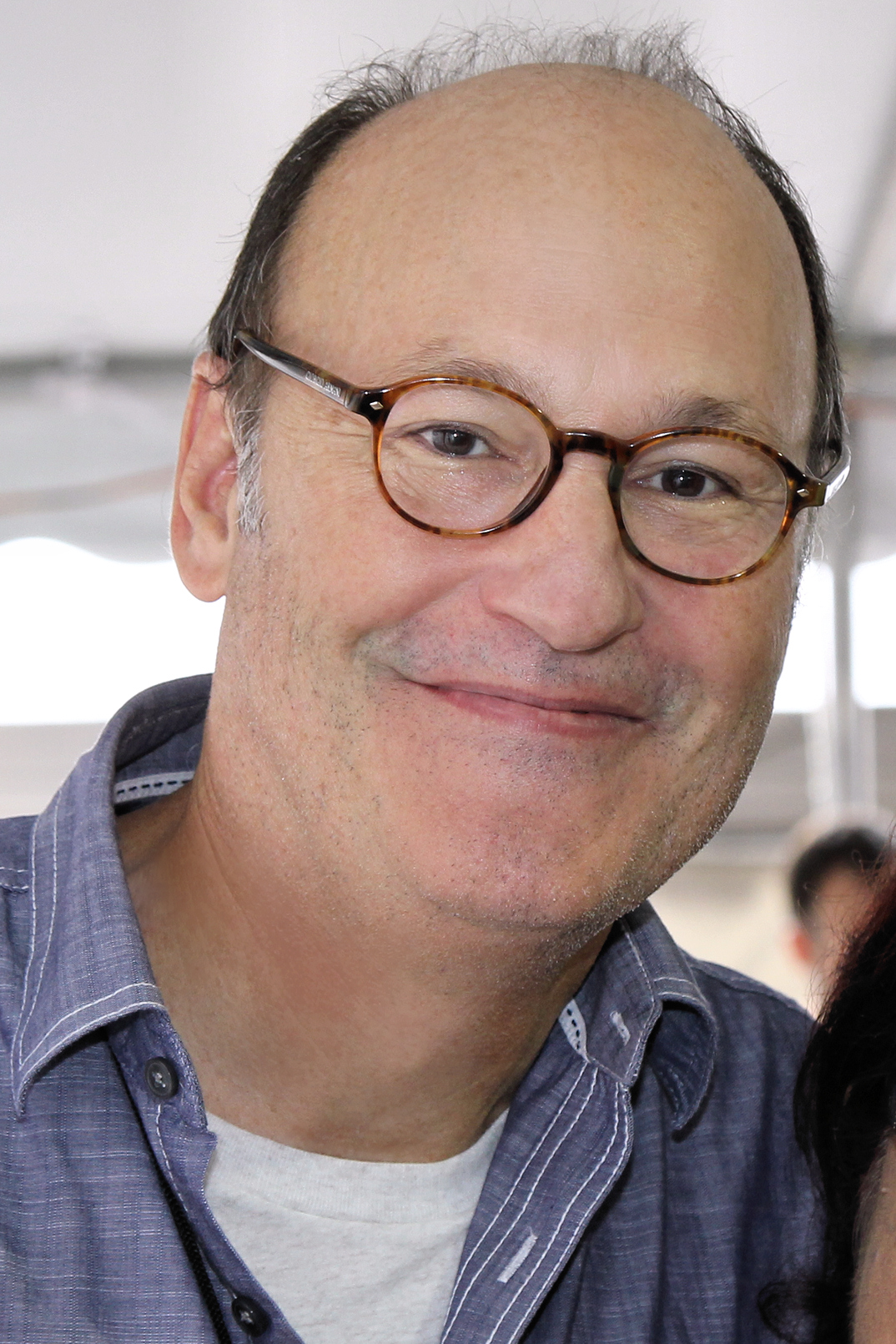
Loren Long illustrated the book

In 2003, American singer Madonna signed a contract with Callaway Arts & Entertainment and released her first children's book as an author, The English Roses, which was translated into 42 different languages over 100 countries. The book debuted at number one on The New York Times Best Seller list, spending a total of 18 weeks there. Following the success of The English Roses, Madonna worked on her second book, Mr. Peabody's Apples. In the acknowledgement section, Madonna dedicated the book to "teachers everywhere", while including a moral about the how to choose one's words carefully and the effects of it. She explained that Mr. Peabody's Apples was inspired by a 300-year-old story by rabbi Baal Shem Tov that she heard from her Kabbalah teacher, and wanted to share the "essence" of it in her second release.

Callaway and Madonna wanted the story to be set in the 1940s, during a day in the life of a small town told in a cinematic style. An article in The Times described it as evoking "the highly moral world of Jimmy Stewart and It's a Wonderful Life, of apple pie, picket fences, Little League baseball, milkshakes and—of course—of right and wrong". The pictures were illustrated by Loren Long whose main inspiration was American regionalist artists and conventional realism. Long based Mr. Peabody on a car mechanic who lived in his hometown of Joplin, Missouri while Billy Little was based on his own son Griffith. For illustrating Tommy Tittlebottom as the main antagonist, Long used local resident Jonathan Whitney as a model, after seeing his mischievous nature, comparing him the cartoon character Dennis the Menace. Whitney's mother initially had reservations permitting Long to use her son, but agreed due to "Madonna's reputation as a mother".

Mr. Peabody's Apples was released on November 10, 2003, in over 150 countries and 36 languages worldwide. For the release of the book, Madonna partnered with Audible online stores and Apple Music. It included two interviews with the singer on Radio KOL, and a teaser clip of Madonna narrating the story on AOL. The initial print-run of the book was 130,000 according to The Bookseller magazine. Publisher Nicholas Callaway said that the book would be simultaneously launched on online, print and audio media stores. Madonna appeared at different events, including the book fair at Montclair Kimberley Academy, to launch the book, and read excerpts from it in front of a live audience. She also appeared on television talk shows like The Tonight Show with Jay Leno, Live with Kelly and Ryan and Late Show with David Letterman to promote the book.

== Critical and commercial reception ==
Mr. Peabody's Apples debuted at number one on The New York Times Best Seller list, and remained atop the list for three weeks. By October 2004, it had sold 127,000 copies according to Nielsen BookScan. In Estonia, the book sold 4,000 units. The book was not received well critically. Samantha Critchell from The Associated Press called the a book "a little hokey". The critic believed that it would be a big seller, but the premise was "stale" since the target was young readers and grade-school going children, who might not respond well to a tale of moral. "You'd think that a celebrity with Madonna's notoriety [...] wouldn't need a centuries-old story to inspire her to write about the value of truth and the pain that comes with gossip that spreads like wildfire," the reviewer concluded. Deirdre Donahue from USA Today panned the release, especially Madonna naming a character Billy Little just because he is short. Donahue found the story to lack depth unlike the previous release, The English Roses, and declared Mr. Peabody's Apples as "a dreary, heavy-handed tale" with a "pedestrian and predictable" message.

Reviewing the book for Tablet, Ayelet Waldman felt that neither Mr. Peabody's Apples nor The English Roses "will be added to the list of approved reading material kept by the world's Jewish grandmothers", although she believed that the former book contained a simple moral and "nice" metaphor. American writer E. Lockhart reviewed the book for Salon under her real name Emily Jenkins. She found Madonna's second endeavor to be "neither bouncy nor flirty", rather described it as "dour and joyless, despite the pretty masculinity of Loren Long's Norman Rockwell-style illustrations. Jenkins noted that children were depicted in the book as " passive receptors of adult wisdom, but here, the misguided semi-protagonist ends up in a guilty, never-to-be-redeemed limbo for his relatively innocent crime".

A review in the Publishers Weekly was critical of the story, but praised Long's illustrations, describing them as "lushly nostalgic gouaches, with their robin's-egg blue skies, bountiful golden farmlands and working men in straw hats and rolled sleeves, pay homage to the rural paintings of Thomas Hart Benton." Similar thoughts were echoed by Tim Adams from The Guardian, who believed that the story was saved by "Long's glorious illustrations which cast Norman Rockwell light on Mad magazine faces". Nicolette Jones from The Times found the story to be "more coherent than its predecessor [The English Roses], lacks its irritating conversational asides and has more sense of time and place".

== Release details ==
Region	Date	Format	Publisher	Ref.
United Kingdom	November 7, 2003	Audio book	Callaway	
United States	November 10, 2003	Hardcover; Paperback; Audio	Callaway	
United Kingdom	November 10, 2003	Hardcover	Puffin Books	
United Kingdom	November 11, 2003	Paperback	Puffin Books	
France	November 11, 2003	Hardcover	Scholastic Canada	
Spain	November 11, 2003	Hardcover	Scholastic International	
Italy	January 2, 2004	Hardcover	Puffin Books	
Germany	April 6, 2006	Audio book	Feltrinelli	

== See also ==
- List of literary works by number of translations
