= Gennady Spirin =

Russian painter

Gennady Spirin (born 25 December 1948) is a Russian painter and children's book illustrator. A graduate of the Surikov School of Fine Art in Moscow and the Moscow Stroganov Institute of Art, he is noted for his unique style of watercolor illustration. He has illustrated works by classic authors such as William Shakespeare, Anton Chekhov and Leo Tolstoy as well as children's books by contemporary celebrities. He is perhaps best known for his illustration of Madonna's Yakov and the Seven Thieves and Julie Andrews' Simeon's Gift. His oil paintings hang in public and private galleries throughout the world. He has been profiled by The New York Times. His depiction of The Nutcracker was selected by Saks Fifth Avenue as the centerpiece of their famous Christmas display in 1997 and 1998. Following the dissolution of the Soviet Union in 1992, Spirin immigrated with his wife and sons to the United States, ultimately settling in Princeton, NJ, where he has lived and worked since.
