= Sex (book) =

1992 book by Madonna

- The Mylar sheet wrapped cover of Sex, showing Madonna's face
- Author: Madonna
- Cover artist: Steven Meisel
- Genre: S&M; fantasy; erotic photography
- Publisher: Warner Books; Maverick; Callaway
- Publication date: October 21, 1992
- Publication place: United States
- Media type: Print (hardback)
- ISBN: 978-84-406-3117-6
- OCLC: 26846575
- Dewey Decimal: 779/.28
- LC Class: ML420.M1387

Sex is a 1992 coffee table book written by American singer Madonna, with photography by Steven Meisel Studio and Fabien Baron. It was edited by Glenn O'Brien and published by Warner Books, Maverick and Callaway. The book features adult content including softcore pornography and simulations of sexual acts including sadomasochism.

Madonna developed Sex after Judith Regan of Simon & Schuster publishers suggested a book of erotic photographs. She wrote it as a character named "Mistress Dita", inspired by 1930s film actress Dita Parlo. It was influenced by punk rock and fashion figures including Guy Bourdin, Helmut Newton and Robert Mapplethorpe. The photos were shot in early 1992 in New York City and Miami, in locations including hotels, burlesque theaters, and city streets. The book includes cameos by actress Isabella Rossellini, rappers Big Daddy Kane and Vanilla Ice, model Naomi Campbell, gay porn star Joey Stefano, actor Udo Kier, and socialite Princess Tatiana von Fürstenberg. The cover is made of aluminium, spiral bound and wrapped in a boPET sheet.

Madonna's publishers were apprehensive about the release and the book's commercial potential. It was released on October 21, 1992, the day after Madonna's fifth studio album Erotica. A CD single was also packaged with the book which contained the song "Erotic", a song similar in composition to her similarly named single "Erotica". It sold over 150,000 copies on its first day in the United States, and topped the New York Times Best Seller list for three weeks. In a matter of days, Sex went on to sell more than 1.5 million copies worldwide and remains the best- and fastest-selling coffee table book. It also remains as one of the most in-demand out-of-print publications of all time.

Sex attracted extensive media attention and backlash, but Madonna remained unapologetic. Though it initially received negative reviews from fans and critics, who felt she had "gone too far", later reviews have been more positive, with academics deeming it a defining phase in Madonna's career. Sex is noted for its social and cultural impact and is considered a bold postmodern feminist work.

== Background and development ==
According to Giselle Benatar of Entertainment Weekly, two versions explain how Madonna came up with the idea for the book. One is that she conceived the idea of an erotic photography book during the shooting of the film A League of Their Own in the summer of 1991. The other is that Judith Regan, vice-president and editor-in-chief of Simon & Schuster, armed with a proposal for a collection of photo-erotica, flew to Los Angeles in March 1991 to meet with Madonna and her manager Freddy DeMann. She verified Regan had not approached other celebrities with the concept as she was only interested in the project if it was a unique idea. By the end of the meeting Madonna had agreed "in principle" to do a book titled Madonna's Book of Erotica and Sexual Fantasies. She told Regan that DeMann would call her and work out the book's details. However, Madonna never got back to Regan who assumed she did not want to go ahead with the idea. Madonna's publicist Liz Rosenberg has never confirmed nor denied Regan's claim that they had an agreement.

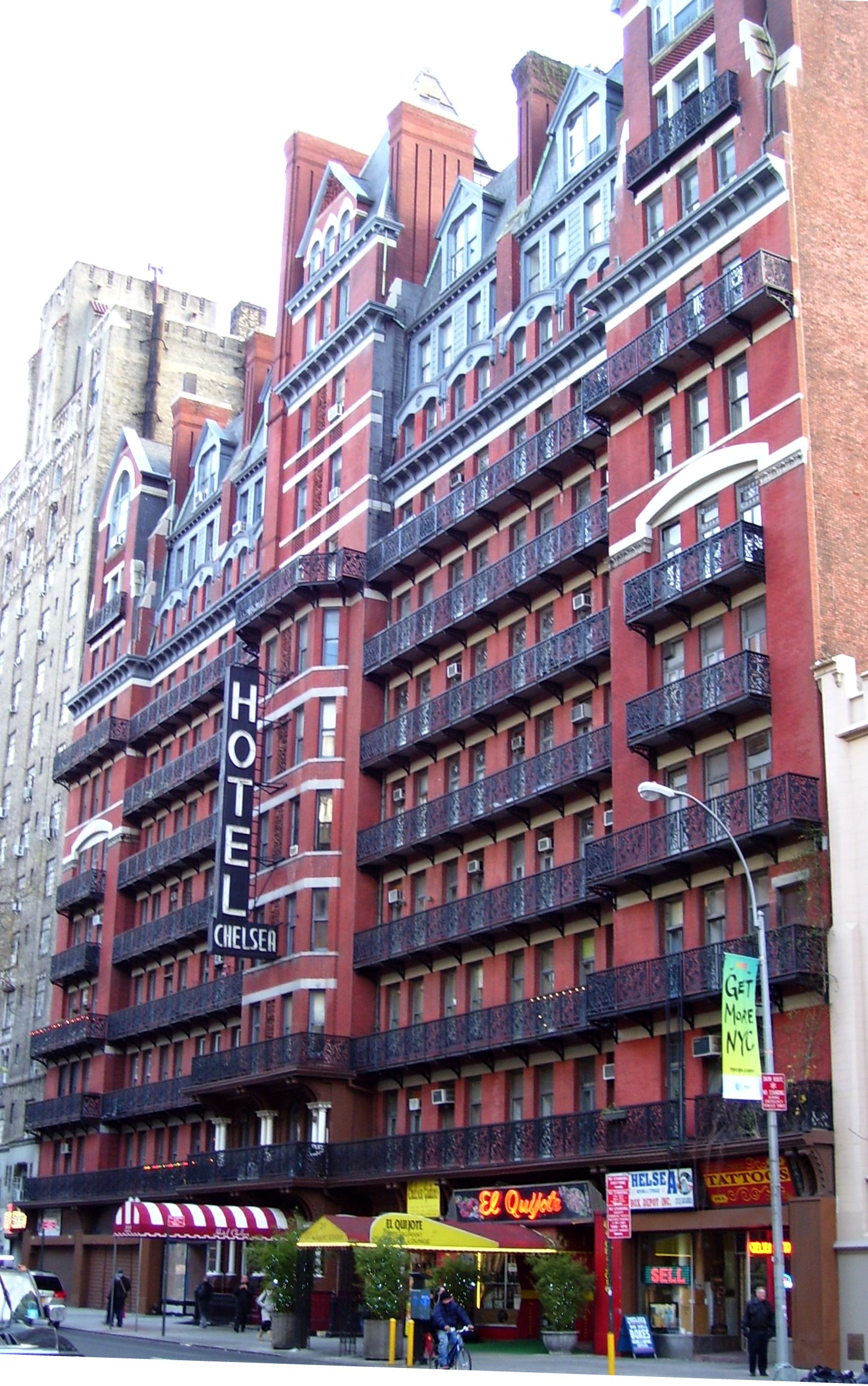
Some of the pictures for the project were shot at Hotel Chelsea, New York.

According to Benatar, Madonna began working on Sex before wrapping up shooting A League of Their Own. At first, Warner Bros. Records and the executive directors of Time Warner were reluctant to allow Madonna to publish such a book, but finally agreed. Madonna had to sign a contract that forbade the book from including images of child pornography, bestiality, or religious imagery. Not long after signing the agreement, Madonna founded Maverick, a multi-media entertainment company in partnership with Time Warner. Since by contract she had total artistic control over any work released by Maverick, who were now the book's publisher, the agreement she signed with Time Warner over the content in Sex was null and void.

Sex's stylized, sado-masochistic look had a range of influences from punk rock, to early fashion iconoclasts like Guy Bourdin and his surrealism, and Helmut Newton. Photographs from Brassaï's 1933 book Paris de nuit (Paris by Night) also inspired several of the book's series of images. The book was also influenced by Robert Mapplethorpe's infamous three-part XYZ portfolio, particularly the X portfolio. Madonna had considered using X as a title during the formative stages of Sex, but she changed her mind when promotion for Spike Lee's film Malcolm X began. (It was released three weeks after the book). She would go on to tell Vogue magazine: "We were gonna call it X [...] but then the whole thing with the Malcolm X movie started. At first I thought, 'Fuck it, it's a really good symbol and I thought of it first'. But I realized it might be confusing or look like I was copying Spike [Lee]. Besides, Sex is almost as powerful: it's universal, it doesn't need translation – and it's only two letters more than X."

Madonna hired top-notch talent for the book's development, and counted on the help of friends from the music, film and fashion industry. She hired Fabien Baron as the art director, fashion photographer Steven Meisel, editor Glenn O'Brien, make-up artist Francois Nars and hairstylist Paul Cavaco. Madonna originally wanted the book to be an oval shape to simulate a condom, but its printing and manufacturing would have been too expensive. Meisel would later comment: "Madonna and I can keep up with each other", noting "I'm doing things to make people think too. It's not really to antagonize or to push people's buttons. It's really to present another way of seeing things."

During the photo sessions for Sex, photographer Steven Meisel was accompanied by art director Fabion Baron who filmed the shoots on Super 8 film for use in the music video for the song "Erotica". The photo sessions took place in New York City and Miami. Locations in New York City included the Hotel Chelsea and Times Square's all-male burlesque Gaiety Theatre whose dancers participated in one of the book's photo sessions along with porn star Joey Stefano and actor Udo Kier. Many of the Miami photo sessions took place at Madonna's Coconut Grove mansion that she had recently purchased before beginning the Sex book project, while other sessions were done on several beaches and streets close to her home. One morning during the four-day Florida shoot Madonna was prancing naked around her 14-bedroom house in Miami when someone jokingly suggested she go out on the street, which she did on two occasions – topless with Vanilla Ice and completely nude while pretending to hitchhike. According to Baron on the street "cars screeched to a halt, motorists whistled, and one entranced cyclist fell off his bike". During the photo shoots Baron said, "[Madonna]'d do something crazy and then we'd come up with something even crazier". One of the most shocking photographs features two women in post-punk attire flanking Madonna with one of them holding a knife to her crotch. It was considered too violent to be used. While the book was being produced some of the photographs were stolen but were quickly recovered by the FBI. According to New York magazine, there were approximately 80,000 photographs taken for the book; only a handful of them were used. It took 15 days to print the book. The total production process took about eight months. Warner Bros. commented that Sex was very difficult to produce, requiring contributions from many printing companies. They noted that to make a profit the book needed to sell at least 350,000 copies.

== Design and content ==
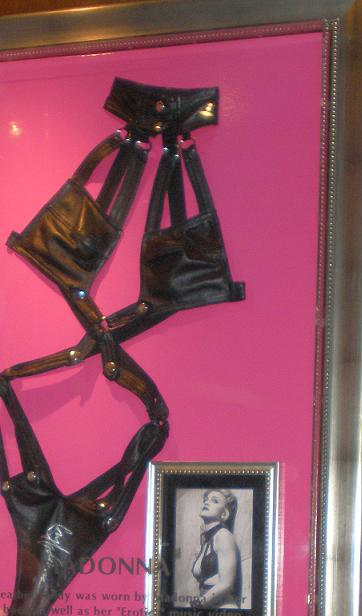
The exotic black leather one-piece stage outfit worn by Madonna in the Sex book, as well as in the "Erotica" music video.

Wrapped and sealed in a polyethylene terephthalate (PET) Mylar bag, Sex has 128 pages and is spiral bound with an aluminium cover that has the word "Sex" stamped in the middle and a warning label. The front page shows Madonna against a sky blue backdrop. Three different types of paper were used for the printing. Madonna and Baron & Baron Inc. (consisting of Fabien Baron and the photographer Siung Fat Tjia), who also collaborated with her designing the cover art for her fifth studio album, Erotica, oversaw the design. As this was Maverick's first project, the packaging was crucial. Madonna had no faith in Warner Book's "mass-market" publication process, however, so Baron suggested they transfer the packaging job to Nicholas Callaway's bespoke Callaway Editions. Charles Melcher, the book's co-publisher with Callaway, said they usually published "exquisite art books, $100 high end, beautiful things". It was a challenge for them to process Madonna's ideas into reality. The artist wanted the packaging to be sealed, so the reader had to tear it open to read the book. They considered various kinds of clasps before deciding on a sealed bag as a reference to a condom package. The metal cover was Madonna's idea. She was inspired by the 1979 album Metal Box by Public Image Ltd. Melcher recalls, "We were talking about materials for the cover, and we went into her kitchen. [Madonna] pointed at the metal plate at the back of her stove and said, 'I want something like this'. I was very impressed with the way she interacted with her world to source things". The company bought about 1,500,000 pounds (680,000 kg) of aluminium, roughly a pound for each book. The designers oversaw the production of the front and back covers, which were stamped and anodized while the aluminium was rolling on a press.

The book opens with the introduction: "Everything you are about to see and read is a fantasy, a dream, pretend." Throughout Sex, Madonna offers poems, stories, and essays. She used the pseudonym "Mistress Dita" as an homage to German actress Dita Parlo; her friends in the stories are Bunny, Dex, Stella, Chiclet and Stranger. According to biographer J. Randy Taraborrelli, a big part of the book reads like a letter to a pornographic magazine. Madonna wanted to explore the notion of power in Sex. Melcher said she wanted to talk about "gentle and hard, soft and violent [in Sex]. She was playing out all those elements in her book. That was reflected in the materials: uncoated, soft paper on the inside and hard metal coating on the outside".

Like the text—which was mostly printed on the photographs—they are highly sexual and depict nudity, simulations of sexual acts, bondage, homosexuality and analingus, with accessories such as knives, whips, masks and chains; however, intercourse is never shown. Actress Isabella Rossellini, rappers Big Daddy Kane and Madonna's then-boyfriend Vanilla Ice, model Naomi Campbell, gay porn star Joey Stefano, actor Udo Kier, socialite Princess Tatiana von Fürstenberg, and nightclub owner Ingrid Casares and unknown models are featured in the book. Its heterosexual photos involve only Madonna and Vanilla Ice. Madonna herself is featured partially or completely naked. One of the book's most famous photographs shows a naked Madonna hitchhiking in Miami. The book also reflects Dita's perspective towards her own sexuality. She writes that her "pussy" is a temple of learning and exposing it, is really an homage to it. "It's hard to describe it smells like a baby to me fresh and full of life. I love my pussy, it is the complete summation of my life." Sex contains statements like "ass fucking is the most pleasurable way to get fucked and it hurts the most too". "There is something comforting about being tied up. Like when you were a baby and your mother strapped you in the car seat. She wanted you to be safe. It was an act of love". "I wouldn't want a penis. It would be like having a third leg. it seems like a contraption that would get in the way. I think I have a dick in my brain". Dita also points out "A lot of people are afraid to say what they want. That's why they don't get what they want". Since they recovered stolen pictures during the making of Sex, Madonna thanked the FBI for "rescuing photographs that would have made J. Edgar Hoover roll over" in the book's credits.

== Publication and promotion ==
The book's imminent release caused a great deal of controversy. One photo showed a nude Madonna wearing a rabbit's tail, shaving the pubic hair of a naked man, and cavorting outdoors with a dog, suggesting bestiality. The Vatican urged its followers to boycott the book, saying that it was "morally intolerable". Indian customs officials said the book offended the country's public morality. The Press Trust of India (PTI), India's domestic news agency, quoted a top customs official as saying the book would be seized under a section of the Customs Act prohibiting entry of indecent literature. Citizens of Alexandria, Louisiana, filed a complaint with the city's police department on behalf of the Rapides Parish Chapter of the American Family Association, claiming Sex violated Louisiana's anti-obscenity laws. U.S. Southern Baptists did not want their Bibles printed on the same printing presses as Sex and threatened to stop doing business with the printer RR Donnelley. The Nashville-based Baptist Sunday School Board, a division of the Southern Baptist Convention, reviewed their $2.1 million ($4,817,999 in 2025 dollars) printing contract with Donnelley. Board President James Draper said he was infuriated Donnelley printed "such an obscene book". Entertainment Tonight reported Madonna had initiated the mayhem with the explicit content in the music video for "Erotica", walking bare breasted at designer Jean Paul Gaultier's fashion show and posing nude in Vanity Fair magazine. A writer for The Sacramento Bee said that since the press wanted "controversy", Madonna was willing to give them "fodder" with her "antiques".

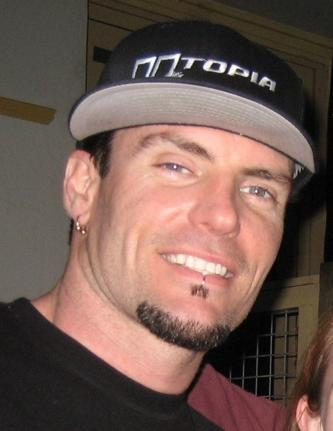
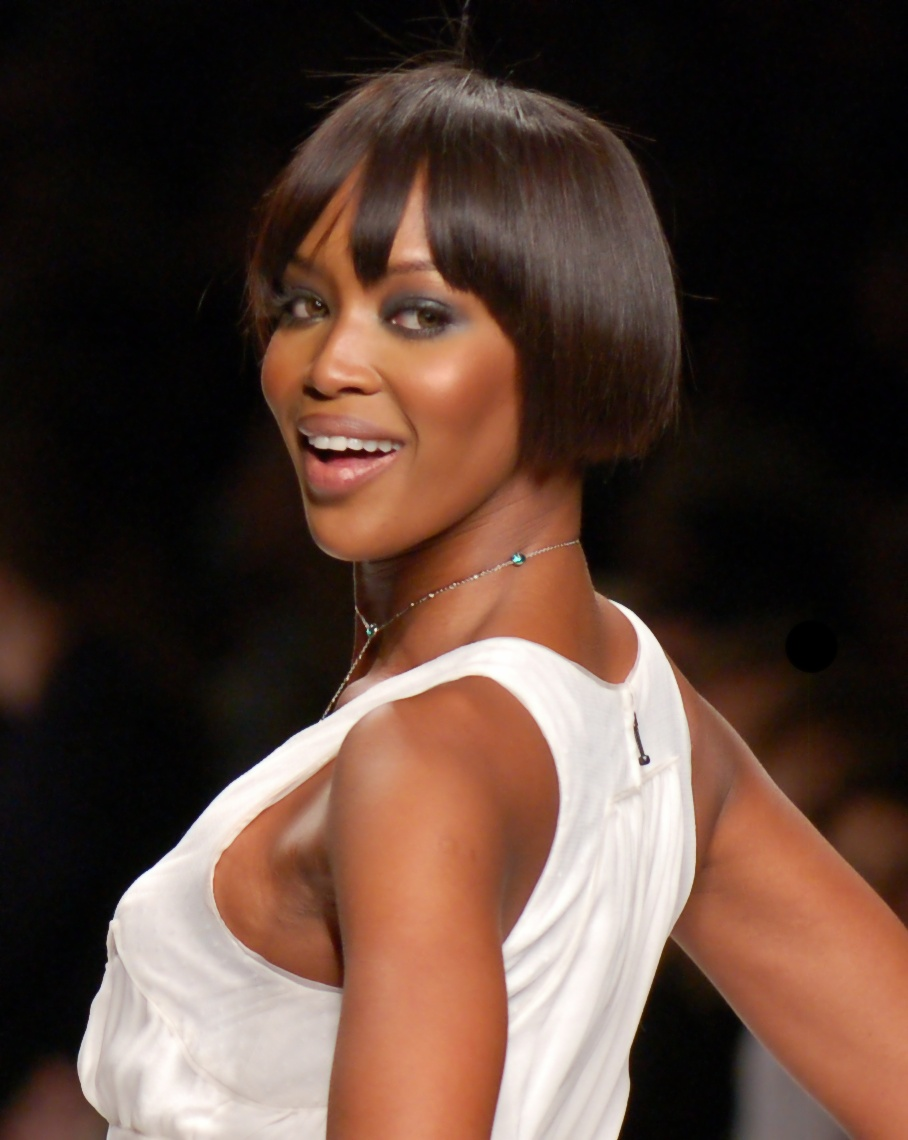
Rapper Vanilla Ice (left) and model Naomi Campbell (right) are among the celebrities who appeared in the book. Both appeared in explicit images alongside Madonna.

Madonna claimed she was publishing Sex "to liberate America — free us all of our hang-ups". She told Spin: "We live in a very repressed society, and I deal with erotic themes. The point I try to make is: Why should we feel ashamed of our sexuality?". She stated later that the book "does not condone unsafe sexual practices". Nicholas Callaway of Callaway Arts & Entertainment said the book was "inevitably going to be controversial. The book explores every aspect of sexual fantasy. It's hard to calculate the effect, [but], Sex should be considered 'art'". It was rumored that Time Warner was nervous about the book's release, however, in an interview with Vanity Fair, William Sarnoff, president of Warner Books, said he felt Madonna "should pursue all avenues of creativity as she defines it". The Warner company said they would make sure Sex reached its target audience. They reminded the public the book was safely wrapped in a Mylar bag to prevent in-store peeping and contained a warning label.

Michael Kilian of the Chicago Tribune published a tongue-in-cheek article on October 7, 1992, about the coming release: "Prepare thyself, [...], The mega-event of the millennium is to occur in precisely two weeks. It's an event far more mega than the November election, the collapse of communism or even the crowning of Leanza Cornett as the new Miss America." Kilian went on to write: "The word on the street (which is precisely where it belongs) is that this is the hottest Truly Twisted personal sexual fantasy picture book in all Christendom, that it goes far beyond all previous Truly Twisted personal sexual fantasy picture books-perhaps beyond all imagining what such a book could be."

On October 15, Madonna threw a pre-release party at New York City's Industria Superstudio having signed all the invitations with "Dita" her Sex alter ego. She dressed as Little Bo Peep carrying a stuffed toy lamb. Madonna's publicist Liz Rosenberg expressed concern at first about "what the parents of America's impressionable teens will soon be thinking" of Madonna, but said that it "all depends on your idea of lovemaking, which in Madonna's case, should give new meaning to the word erotic". Waldenbooks and Barnes & Noble prepared corporate statements store managers could share with customers who were offended by Sex. (Both statements defended the right of bookstores to provide "diversity and choice" to customers, saying censorship is not the role of bookstores.) Many book stores stated the book would not be sold to anyone under 18 and it would only be on display behind the cash register. Bookstore owner David Epstein said, "The feeling of most people who have ordered the book is that Madonna is something special, that this is cutting-edge art [...] they're not the kind of people who are buying it because it's smut and dirty pictures. People are interested in it as art."

Sex was released on October 21, 1992, the day after Madonna's fifth studio album Erotica. A comic book title Dita in The Chelsea Girl and a promotional single titled "Erotic", wrapped in packaging representing a condom wrapper, was included with the book. "Erotic", a stripped-down arrangement of the song "Erotica", offered an alternate vocal take not used on the album version. Upon its release, the book was banned in India, Ireland, Japan and some Australian states.

Given the controversy surrounding the book there was no need for Madonna to promote it. One of the few promotions she did, however, was to appear on the cover of the October edition of Vogue, dressed in "Hippie trip" fashion. These photographs were taken by Meisel. On October 22, 1992, MTV aired a special called The Day in Madonna, hosted by Kurt Loder (a pun on the title of their daily show The Day in Rock). It profiled the release of Madonna's Sex and her album Erotica, even taking the book to the streets to allow people, including a sex therapist and a group of real-life New York City dominatrices, to view it. MTV also interviewed people who had looked at the book on the day of its release at the HMV music store in New York City. To celebrate its release, the store held a Madonna look-alike contest and set up a booth where people could view the book for one dollar a minute, with the proceeds going to Lifebeat, the music industry organization founded to help fund AIDS research.

== Critical response ==
"I don't think sex is bad. I don't think nudity is bad. I don't think that being in touch with your sexuality and being able to talk about it is bad. I think the problem is that everybody's so uptight about it and have turned it into something bad when it isn't. If people could talk about it freely, we would have more people practicing safe sex, we wouldn't have people sexually abusing each other.

— Madonna discussing the backlash surrounding the book

Critics, and conservative, feminist and anti-porn groups reacted negatively to the book because of its sexually explicit photographs, which many characterized as hardcore pornography. J. Randy Taraborrelli, in his biography of Madonna, wrote that much of the book appears surprising, not shocking. He derided the concept as childish and impetuous. Though Madonna insisted she was trying to demystify sexuality altogether, he believed she just wanted to publish pornographic text and pictures and get away with it: "She was being a brat, not a revolutionary." Author Lucy O'Brien declared the book a bold, harrowing exercise in frustration, and despite Madonna's attempt at invincibility, it appeared to be "a curious act of self-destruction". Anthony DeCurtis of Rolling Stone said "The overwhelming effect of the book is numbing". Describing the photographs as "derivative", he wrote that "Madonna herself seems far too eager to shock; that, not even prurient arousal, seems the ideal response the book tirelessly seeks. The potency of Sex's subject matter is dissipated by Madonna and Meisel's self-congratulatory – and silly – sense of their own 'bravery,' as if their naughty games were somehow revolutionary."

Roger Catlin of the Hartford Courant said some passages from the book were "too dirty to quote ... even the funny ones". The Daily Beast said "the book is neither groundbreaking (save that it features a major star) nor particularly sexy [...] Sex is convincing only when it's playful, as when she appears nude in a Miami pizzeria, chewing a slice while a baffled customer looks on. Elsewhere, she's simply undressed with no place to go." Richard Harrington of The Washington Post, in a mixed review, wrote: "Is Sex shocking? Not really. Mostly because it's Madonna, and somehow we've come to expect this from her. Is Sex boring? Surprisingly, yes." British author Zoë Heller of The Independent wrote that it was "the women who once saw Madonna as a witty feminist role model who have been most alarmist about her latest pornographic incarnation ... Previously, they say, Madonna played with traditional images of feminine sexuality in a subversive, 'empowering' way. But now, with sado-masochism and rape fantasies, she has gone too far."

Calvin Tomkins, author and art critic for The New Yorker, wrote that "unfortunately, the book is going to be mistaken for pornography". Vanity Fair deemed it "the dirtiest coffee table book to ever be published". Caryn James, in The New York Times, wrote: "There is plenty here to offend the meek (whips and chains), the self-righteous (gay men and lesbians), not to mention the tasteful (a tacky and cluttered art design)". The Times' Vicki Goldberg was dismissive, writing, "Unfortunately, not many of the images are very good photographically. Many are just pictures, or just porn." Writing for Spin, Bob Guccione, Jr. gave the book a particularly unfavorable review:

Madonna has overstayed her welcome. She's becoming the human equivalent of the Energizer Bunny, flashing us her breasts in every magazine that'll let her. [...] Her book Sex, is a rip-off. Because it's not about sex, it's more about a hatred of it. [...] The book is not erotic. It's all somehow, astonishingly, dead. As sexy as a body chart at the doctor's office. Because it's just as precise and soulless. [Sex] is a con job because instead of being flagrant pornography, it dresses itself up as Great Art. The text is pretentious and derives most, if not all, of its impact from the fact that it's Madonna talking, quite a lot... Any other model would sound no more or less coarse, just uninteresting.

== Commercial reception ==
=== Pre-release ===
With Sex, Madonna broke several worldwide records. The retail price of the book was $50 in the United States, or around $115 in 2025 dollars. Across Europe, Sex was sold for £25 in the United Kingdom, and for pta 7500 in Spain (an equivalent of $70 at the time or $161 in 2025). The most expensive sales were found in Argentina with a retail price of $89, which is about $204 in 2025 dollars.

The initial print run for the first edition was one million copies in five continents and in five languages. It set the record for the largest first printing of an illustrated book in publishing history. Callaway pointed out the book was an "unprecedented hit", because the print run of an average art book ranges between 5,000 and 10,000 units. Hundreds of copies of the book were pre-ordered, prompting book sellers to say that Sex was "shattering their sales records for advance purchases". John Robinson from Santa Cruz Sentinel informed that many booksellers agreed that "Sex sold, like nothing else before" and "they've never seen anything like it, especially for a $50 book". In Canada, H.B. Fenn and Company, distributors of Sex, reported an order for more than 45,000 copies from bookstores across the country by October 22.

=== Release ===
In the United States, Sex sold 150,000 copies on its release day, with additional 500,000 units a week later. The book also reached the number one on both The Washington Post and The New York Times Best Seller list, topping the latter for three weeks. By the end of the year, Sex ended among the Top 15 of the best-selling titles in the United States with sales of over 750,000 units. The book became a "huge bestseller" in Canada after a "careful review" by customs authorities according to Quill & Quire. It sold out 45,000 copies across the country, becoming one of the fastest-selling books in Canadian history. In the United Kingdom, Sex sold 100,000 copies in its first day, including 80,000 units in the first half an hour in London according to Creative Camera. Sex ended as the second best-selling hardcover book of 1992 in the UK, behind Andrew Morton's Diana biography.

In France, Madonna held the record for the highest first-month sales for a book in history, before being surpassed by Thierry Meyssan with L'Effroyable Impasture in 2002. In Paris alone, 23,000 copies were sold in the first hour of release. Sex sold 7,220 units in Spain within its first two days, and 2,000 copies in the first five-hours in the city of Buenos Aires, Argentina. In Italy, the book moved 5,000 copies. By October 24, a spokeswoman for Australian distributors, Octopus Publishing, informed thousands of copies of Sex had been sold in Western Australia. In New Zealand, the trade director for distributor, Reed Publishing, expected that by mid-day on release day most North Island retailers would have sold all of their copies of the book.

Despite the censorship, Sex was able to sell 150,000 units of an edited version of the initial printing in Japan, topping the national best-selling list upon its release. According to the Chinese state newspaper, the book sold 5,000 copies in its first week in the city of Shanghai alone. Although the book was censored shortly after its publication, several hundred copies were sold in the Irish capital.

Worldwide, the book sold 700,000 units in its first day. In summary, Sex went on to sell 1.5 million copies worldwide in a matter of days, becoming the fastest-selling coffee table book in history. It remains the best-selling coffee table book of all time. In 1999, Ed Brown from Fortune called Sex the best-selling illustrated book in history, further comparing that "for most publishers, selling 20,000 copies of a coffee-table book is a minor miracle".

=== Reactions ===
By December 1992, Paul Craig from McClatchy called it the biggest wonder of the year in literature. Giselle Benatar described Sex as "the publishing event of the century". A day prior its release, Tyra Braden of The Morning Call concluded that the book "might become a collector's item a few years down the road". Writing for San Francisco Chronicle in 1999, Joel Selvin noted the prices for the book on the web, ranging from $200 to $500 for sealed copies; ten times the original $50 cover price. According to Barry Walters from Rolling Stone in 2019, Sex remains one of the most in-demand out-of-print publications of all time. A long-lasting title at BookFinder.com's lists, Sex featured as the most requested out-of-print publication from 2011 to 2015. In their database, AbeBooks recalls: "The most famous out-of-print book of modern times is Madonna's Sex book, which remains in demand but the pop star refuses to republish it".

== Social impact and aftermath ==
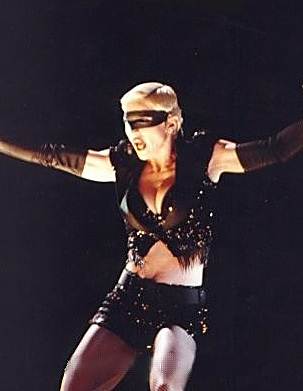
Madonna's performances in The Girlie Show faced negative reactions from conservative groups, who deemed her immoral.

The book, though widely panned by the press, is regarded as one of the factors that shaped the social reaction and criticism of Madonna during the early 1990s. Her fifth studio album Erotica was affected by the negative press surrounding the book. In March 1993, Spin wrote an article praising the book. Months later in Mexico, social communicologist Nino Canún dedicated an episode of his morning talk show ¿Y usted qué opina? (English: So what's your opinion?), to Madonna. Some members of the audience, among them a priest, presented their arguments why The Girlie Show concert tour by "this morally clueless singer" should not be allowed in Mexico. Later, during the Mexican concert, in response to these comments, Madonna wore a charro sombrero and simulated an orgy with her dancers onstage.

Continuing her provocative work, Madonna starred in the erotic thriller Body of Evidence, which features her fully nude engaging in simulated sexual acts. In March 1994, she was a guest on Late Show with David Letterman, used profanity, and handed Letterman a pair of her underwear asking him to smell it. The release of her sexually explicit works, and the aggressive appearance on Letterman led some critics to see Madonna as a sexual renegade. She also faced a strong negative reaction from critics and fans who commented that "she had gone too far" and that her career was over. Author Lucy O'Brien commented:

The perfect iconic goddess of True Blue had all gone. In the same way that sixties beauties like Nico, Marianne Faithfull and Brigitte Bardot set about destroying their beauty after they were famous, the very thing they felt limited them, Madonna annihilated hers. Within a few short years she moved from teasing flirtation to desperate sexual display. It is ironic that after the triumph of Like a Prayer, she hits this bathos. Being a blond again set her off in the wrong direction. It was as if with the Sex book she showed the underside of the Hollywood dream.

In Sex [Madonna] of course, was saying exactly what she wanted, warts and all... Indeed, this idea that she was penning her own sexual narrative was perhaps the most shocking part of the whole enterprise. And while it was easy to critique Sex, it should be applauded for this balls-to-the-wall honesty.

— Priya Elan discussing the book.

Madonna responded to the huge backlash with the song "Human Nature", from her next album Bedtime Stories (1994), with the lyrics "Did I say something wrong? Oops, I didn't know I couldn't talk about sex," while declaring "And I'm not sorry. It's human nature." She later explained: "I wouldn't say I regret it. I've made mistakes and learned from them. Most people want to hear me say that I regret publishing my Sex book. I don't. The problem was releasing my Erotica album at the same time. I love that album and it got overlooked." In 2003, Madonna said: "I'm not apologizing in any shape or form [...] I was interested in pushing buttons and being rebellious and being mischievous and trying to bend the rules. There was a lot of irony in the Sex book and I am poking fun at a lot of things and I am being kind of silly and adolescent and I am being very f you, if a man can do it, I can do it."

In 2002, Naomi Campbell said she had "a lot of respect for Madonna being bold enough to come out and do a book on sex. I've never reneged on that." In 2009, rapper Vanilla Ice confessed to being unhappy with the book once he saw it. "My friends were like, 'Dude, that's cool man', but I was like, 'I'm dating her, it's not cool to see your girlfriend with all these other people' [...] It kinda ruined the whole thing. I wonder what her kids think of that book? Here she is writing kids' books now but they're going to see it and go, 'Mommy, what were you thinking?'" Another of the book's models, actress Isabella Rossellini, told Out that she regretted her participation: "I don't think the book worked, even though the photos were extraordinary, and some of them quite memorable. I think there was a little bit of a moralistic sort of 'I'll teach you how to be free!' – and that bothered the hell out of me."

Later reviews of Sex have been more positive. The authors of The Porning of America: The Rise of Porn Culture, What It Means, and Where We Go from Here (2008) commented that "the book is particularly interesting in the way that, like many of Madonna's works, it portrays sex in terms of domination and power". Jane Raphaely, editor-in-chief of Cosmopolitan (South Africa) praised Madonna's "liberated behavior in Sex [...] the fact that she takes all forms of pornography and systematically demystifies it by putting it under her control", in an article in 1996. Brian McNair, author of Striptease Culture: Sex, Media and the Democratisation of Desire (2002) praised this period of Madonna's career, saying she had "porno elegance" and that "Sex is a cultural phenomenon of global proportions" which "established her iconic status and cultural influence". Priya Elan of The Guardian, wrote: "That the Sex book came after a record-breaking album and tour felt like a shrink-wrapped curve ball. But Madge was expressing something unique." Elan felt the book was part of a "slower reveal that began with confessional tracks such as 'Oh Father' (from 1989's Like a Prayer) and continued with the many scenes of narcissism captured in In Bed With Madonna".

== Legacy ==
Several writers consider Sex a bold, post-feminist work of art besides being labeled a "cultural book". Martin Amis of The Observer wrote an essay discussing the book's cultural meaning. Critical theorist Douglas Kellner affirmed that with Sex "Madonna became herself, an artifact of pop culture". French academic writer Georges-Claude Guilbert described Sex as "one of the most successful publicity stunts in history", whereas Russell W. Belk, author of Handbook of Qualitative Research Methods in Marketing, feels its success was a product of marketing. Despite the negative feedback, sales of Sex generated more than US$20 million ($45.89 million in 2025 dollars) for Madonna in 1992 from its first print-run. It was deemed as an "unprecedented entrepreneurial coup". Overall, Sex generated US$70 million in sales at retail.

Taraborrelli commented in his book, Madonna: An Intimate Biography, that Madonna's friends knew the book and her behavior were a barrier to shield her from the world. She was tired of the extreme scrutiny from the public and media which she had provoked. Annoyed, Madonna fought back by creating the persona of a renegade, someone so outrageous as to defy explanation, someone found objectionable by most people. Taraborrelli said that in Madonna's view, "she had no other way of fighting back".

According to some writers, Sex also helped Madonna make a name in the porn industry, and earned her the title of S&M's first cultural ambassador earning her praise for recreating "porn-chic". Humberto Quiroga Lavié pointed out because Sex was considered pornographic that helped it to become a bestseller. Steve Bachmann, in his book Simulating Sex: Aesthetic Representations of Erotic Activity pointed out that "perhaps one of the most interesting aspects of Madonna's sexual phenomenon is the extent to which her book marked a new threshold in the pornographic franchise". McNair wrote in his book that, "Sex brought out the personal underground to the surface of pop culture". London art critic Sarah Kent wrote in Time Out that the timing of Sex was "impeccable. Obsession about the human body was in vogue. Along with Madonna's book were artist Andres Serrano's "cumming shots" and Jeff Koons' The Jeff Koons Handbook portraying fairy tale pictures of the artist having sex with his pornographic actor wife, Cicciolina.

"There's a lot of really narrow-minded people. If I can change the way 1/100th of them thinks, then I've accomplished something."

— Madonna

Sex has also become an important book in the LGBT community. Mark Blankenship, of the LGBT-oriented website New Now Next said that "literature changed forever" with the publishing of Sex. Madonna's portrayal of lesbian love scenes in the book sparked debates about her own sexual orientation. This was an adjunct to her public relationship with comedian Sandra Bernhard with whom she visited lesbian nightclubs and partied. The LGBT community felt it was an important portrayal for them. They debated whether Madonna was "ripping" them off for publicity. Carolin Grace of Diva said: "Madonna became meaningful in the early nineties, when Sex came out, and at that point lesbian culture was really changing." She felt women were coming out about their sexuality and the book's handling of the taboo issue was "a legacy, our contribution to the show", stressing "[t]he lesbian sub-cultural references borrowed by Madonna aren't our only possessions." O'Brien argues in her book Madonna: Like an Icon, the book had a confusing philosophy. According to female critics, who pointed out the vacuousness of Madonna's remarks about porn and abuse, she did not understand that behind the fantasies the "reality is too hard" for a woman to endure, referring to the daily hustles that women have to face in red light districts and brothels. The author felt that despite the courageous premise of genuine exploration of queer sex, the book crossed over into pornography and was a wrong portrayal for the community, while being flippant and commercial. She used the example of the death of pornographic actor Joey Stefano, one of the models in the book, from a drug overdose. Stefano had been thrilled to be a part of the book but was underpaid. Once Madonna and her team were done with the shoot, "they packed up and left the Gaiety... They left behind the mundane reality and the boys who have to deal with it seven days a week".

In 2017, Matthew Jacobs from the HuffPost wrote that it was "an audacious thesis statement, calculated enough to piss people off but seemly enough to maintain artistic integrity. No one today would dare emulate it", calling it "the most radical career move a pop star has ever made".

=== 30th anniversary Art Basel exhibition and Christie's auction ===
From November 29 to December 4, 2022, Madonna partnered with Yves Saint Laurent for an art pop-up exhibition titled Sex by Madonna, at Art Basel in Miami Beach. Curated by Madonna and Anthony Vaccarello, large format prints from the book were shown in a temporarily constructed art gallery on the beach. 800 copies of the Sex book were re-issued, with a handful personally signed by Madonna. The price ranged from $1500–3000 and the signed copies were held up for auction, to raise proceeds for Raising Malawi. Various celebrities attended the event.

On May 10, 2023, Christie's announced a collaborative auction on October 6, 2023, with Madonna and Steven Meisel titled Madonna x Meisel – the SEX photographs. The auction will feature over 40 photographs that will go on sale, with proceeds going to Madonna's charity Raising Malawi. Darius Himes, Christie's Deputy Chairman describes the photos as sitting "at a moment in art history of the late 20th century that both summarizes a moment, playful and prescient, and hints at the future of public stardom driven by image-conscious figures. These images are nothing short of brilliant".

== In popular culture ==
Sex has also become an object of modern culture references. American performance artist Ann Magnuson, who worked with Madonna on the 1985 film Desperately Seeking Susan, released a parody of the book's photo sessions, where she simulated sex with a giant stuffed bear. In 2010, writer-performer Greg Scarnici released a book titled Sex in Drag, which featured over 70 images parodying photos in Sex. In a deleted scene from a 1993 episode ("Krusty Gets Kancelled") of the animated sitcom The Simpsons, aired as part of "The Simpsons 138th Episode Spectacular", Krusty the Clown attempts to market a book like Sex to resolve his financial woes. He is seen in a suggestive pose on the front cover. Unlike Madonna, however, Krusty apparently never appeared fully nude, as he quickly claimed that he used a body double.

In 2008, People magazine ranked Madonna's look and attire at the Sex pre-release party as one of her 50 Looks We Can't Forget. In April 2012, a nude picture of Madonna taken by Meisel was put up for sale. An outtake from the book, it features a naked Madonna sporting bleach-blonde hair and dark eye make-up; lying on a bed and partially covered by a sheet, she is smoking a cigarette. An unnamed collector purchased it for almost US$24,000 ($33,657 in 2025 dollars). In 2015, Rolling Stone included the book on its list of 20 Great Moments in Rock Star Nudity. Author Keith Harris wrote that "no celebrity had ever commanded control over her own naked image so audaciously".
