= The English Roses =

Book by Madonna

- The English Roses book cover
- Author: Madonna
- Illustrator: Jeffrey Fulvimari
- Cover artist: Jeffrey Fulvimari
- Series: The English Roses
- Subject: Moral
- Genre: Children's literature
- Publisher: Callaway
- Publication date: September 15, 2003
- Publication place: United States
- Media type: Print; Audio book; Slipcase
- Pages: 48
- ISBN: 978-0-670-03678-3
- OCLC: 52765827
- LC Class: PZ7.M26573
- Followed by: The English Roses: Too Good to be True

The English Roses is a children's picture book written by American entertainer Madonna, released on September 15, 2003, by Callaway Arts & Entertainment. Jeffrey Fulvimari illustrated the book with line drawings. A moral tale, it tells the story of four friends who are jealous of a girl called Binah. However, they come to know that Binah's life is not easy and decide to include her in their group.

Translated into 42 languages, the book was released simultaneously in more than 100 countries worldwide, becoming the first to ever do so. Promotional activities included Madonna hosting a tea party at London's Kensington Roof Gardens, as well as appearances on television talk shows and at book signings. Commercially, The English Roses debuted atop The New York Times Children's Bestseller list and sold over a million copies worldwide. It received moderate reviews from book critics who did not find the story interesting and panned the characterizations and its moralistic tone. Fulvimari's illustrations also received a mixed response. Madonna went on to release merchandise associated with The English Roses and further sequels to the book.

== Synopsis ==
The English Roses are four ethnically-diverse girls—Charlotte (Eastern European), Amy (Anglo-Welsh), Grace (an African-American from Georgia), and Nicole (Anglo-French)—who attend the same school in London. They live in the same neighborhood and participate in the same activities together, including attending summer picnics and ice-skating in winter. They are jealous of an Anglo-Italian girl named Binah, who lives nearby, since they believe her life is perfect. The girls detest her beauty and popularity at school. They enjoy ignoring Binah while concocting naughty plans against her.

One day, the mother of one of the Roses lectures the girls about judging people on the basis of their looks. That night, as the English Roses are at a picnic sleepover, they have the same dream. They are visited by a pumpernickel fairy godmother who sprinkles them with magic dust and transports them to see Binah's life at her home. The girls find that contrary to their belief Binah is actually lonely. Her mother died when she was young, and she lives with her father in a small house where she spends a majority of her time cooking and cleaning. The fairy godmother admonishes the English Roses and asks them to think more kindly of someone in future, rather than complain about their life.

The English Roses feel bad for their behavior towards Binah and invite her to join their group. Soon they strike up a good friendship with her and go on picnics, and to dances and parties together. The girls share all that they like with Binah, and the story ends with there being five English Roses as she joins them.

== Background and writing ==
"I enjoy collaborating with Nicholas because he has impeccable taste. He has been especially helpful in identifying and working with illustrators for each book. I look forward to continuing work with him on future books."

— Madonna talking about collaborating with Nicholas Callaway.

Madonna's first release as an author was the coffee table book Sex, published by her company Maverick and Callaway Arts & Entertainment in 1992. It consisted of photographer Steven Meisel's sexually provocative and explicit images. The book received a negative reaction from the media and the public but quickly sold 1.5 million copies. With the release of Sex, Callaway became a well-known publisher, and its owner Nicholas Callaway looked for opportunities to expand the business further. He believed he had "a certain ability to see ahead ... I do have a sense of what would interest people – even before they sense that interest." He remembered watching Madonna read a book he published, David Kirk's Miss Spider's Tea Party, during an event in March 1995 at New York's Webster Hall, for the release of the music video of her single, "Bedtime Story". Calling it a pajama party, Madonna read the story to an audience of teenagers, with the event being aired on the music video channel MTV.

Callaway found the singer's ability to tell a story enticing, and he got the idea to ask her about writing children's books. The publisher believed that Madonna's worldwide name recognition and cross-cultural appeal would attract an audience to a book written by her. He knew from experience that children's book critics can be fussy, but he was persistent with his idea. At the time Madonna had other commitments. It was only after her marriage to director Guy Ritchie and becoming a mother again (in 2000), she decided to take up the idea of writing children's books. Madonna's Kabbalah teacher had asked her to share the wisdom she had gained through her studies of Jewish mysticism in the form of stories meant for children. The singer felt this was a "cool challenge", although it was an "out-left-field" idea completely different from her musical endeavors. While reading stories to her children at bedtime, Madonna found the books lacked spiritual messages. She also felt that the stories' fairy-tale characters, like Cinderella or Sleeping Beauty, appeared passive and were moved around according to the princes' wishes. Madonna, who was inspired by stories by F. Scott Fitzgerald, Ernest Hemingway, and Flannery O'Connor, was galvanized to write something new by herself. She wrote five stories and sent the manuscripts at the same time to Callaway, suggesting they be published together, but he wanted each story to be developed and released separately.

== Development and inspiration ==
In March 2003, it was announced that Madonna and Callaway Arts & Entertainment had signed a deal with Penguin Group to publish an original series of five illustrated storybooks for children. The first release under this deal was The English Roses. The book and its characters were named after school friends of Madonna's daughter Lourdes at Lycée Franco-Libanais Tripoli. One of the teachers there had described the girls as "The English Roses", which Madonna found "funny". She had already made progress with a few other stories but wanted to write about girls who always felt they did not have "enough". The death of Madonna's mother at an early age had always affected her, so while developing the character of Binah, she drew from her own experiences. Like her, Binah kept a picture of her mother beside her bed. It was Madonna's "own personal experience and I needed to come up with things for her character where kids would stop and go, 'Wow! What would that be like?'" Binah's character was also influenced by Lourdes, since Madonna felt her daughter was often ostracized at school for having a celebrity mother. Finally, The English Roses became a moral story with messages from Kabbalah, drawn from tales that Madonna had heard from her teacher. She also included messages about the perils of envy, ostracization, and assumptions about others' lives.

For The English Roses, Madonna worked with illustrator Jeffrey Fulvimari, whose work was described by Ginny Dougary of The Sunday Times Magazine as "Madeleine meets David Hockney style." Fulvimari described his work for the book as "expressive" and "light-hearted". He felt "free to have fun in a way that is not as acceptable in work targeted to grown-ups." He first created rough drawings and then transferred them to computer, where he could tweak them. The net result made the images appear like "spontaneous" line drawings. The artist first painted the four English Roses with their characters "fully fleshed out". Fulvimari exchanged the rough sketches with Madonna and Callaway, who provided their opinions many times before the final selections.

== Publication and promotion ==
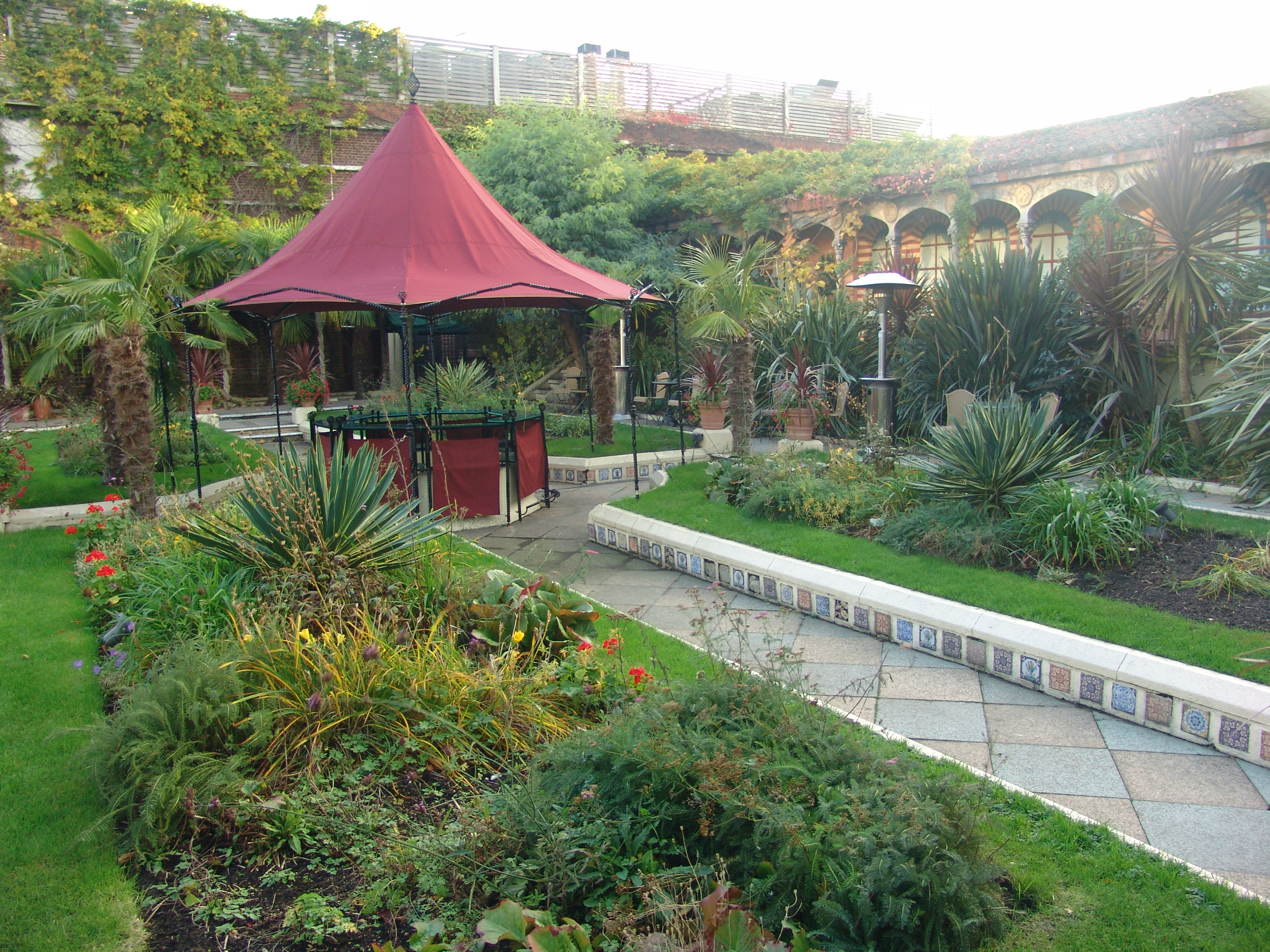
Madonna hosted a tea party for the promotion of the book at London's Kensington Roof Gardens (pictured).

The English language rights for the book were acquired by Penguin Group UK. Puffin Books, Penguin's children's imprint, published the books. The joint press release announcing the deal explained that each story book would involve Madonna working with a different illustrator. Madonna confirmed that all profits from sales of the book were to be donated to charity.

She partnered with Amazon and recorded an exclusive audio message about the book for Amazon's customers. The message was available from September 3 and was the first opportunity for customers to hear the singer talking about The English Roses. The book was not available to the press and media in advance of publication. Puffin employed Coleman Getty Public Relations to handle the book's launch They faced difficulty promoting the book since details of the storyline were not allowed press releases. Nicky Stonehill of Coleman Getty—who had only an hour to discuss the PR strategy with Madonna—used the media hype surrounding the release and struck up an exclusive deal with The Times of London to publish excerpts from the book.

The day before the book's publication Madonna threw a promotional tea party at London's Kensington Roof Gardens, inviting friends and celebrities. A pink, sparkling carpet flanked by fences adorned with roses and butterfly figurines welcomed the guests. At the party, Madonna—dressed in a white satin frock—read from the book to a crowd consisting of teenagers and young children and later gave them gift baskets. Coleman Getty's idea was to have the literary press read the book for the first time at the party and write about the reaction it generated among the children. Only one photographer was allowed to take pictures of the event, and only the film crew from the BBC's children's news program, Newsround, was allowed to film it. On September 15, 2003, Callaway released the picture book simultaneously in 100 countries translated into 42 languages, becoming the first book to be published in 100 countries simultaneously. On the same day, courier services delivered copies of the book to British television talk shows such as GMTV and RI:SE, so it could be discussed during the program.

The singer appeared at multiple promotional events, reading aloud from the book to children. In the United States, Madonna appeared on The Oprah Winfrey Show and book signing events at the Barnes & Noble bookstore in New York City's Rockefeller Center. She also appeared at a news conference in Paris promoting the release.

== Commercial reception ==
The initial print run for The English Roses in the United States grew from a projected 400,000 copies to 750,000 copies with a total of one million copies released worldwide, one of the biggest picture book releases ever. The book was available at over 50,000 bookstores, record stores and other retail outlets in the United States, with initial sales on websites like Amazon being reported as "impressive". It was sold at clothing chain Gap Inc. Profits from the sales were sent to the Spirituality for Kids Foundation. One week after its release the book's print run in the United States reached 900,000 copies with 1.4 million copies printed worldwide. A number of publishers were reprinting the book. Borders advised Diane Roback of Publishers Weekly that sales were "very good"; Barnes & Noble advised her they did not have sales figures but expected the book "to be a big hit." Worldwide, the print run of The English Roses in Italy were 20,000 units, while in Denmark the amount was 3,000 copies. In the latter country, those figures were considered a high number for a Danish picture book according to Berlingske.

The book debuted atop The New York Times Children's Bestseller list, selling 57,369 copies in its first week according to Nielsen BookScan. It was placed at number five in the overall ranking for all releases. The book appeared on the list for a total of 18 weeks and had sold 321,000 copies by October 2004 accounting for 70% of all tracked sales across the United States. In the United Kingdom, The English Roses debuted with 8,270 copies according to BookScan and was ranked number 17 on the top-selling list. It was the second best-selling children's book, with 220 fewer sales than author J. K. Rowling's Harry Potter and the Order of the Phoenix. The book had sold 150,000 units in the UK as of December 2023.

In Russia, The English Roses sold 9,000 copies in the first-week, of which half of those copies were sold in its first-day alone. In Brazil, the book sold-out the first print of 25,000 units upon its first-week of release, while in Turkey, it managed to sell 5,000 copies in the first-week. After its release, the book has sold 10,000 units in Canada, 4,000 in Estonia, 52,000 in France, 20,000 in the Netherlands, and between 65,000 to 80,000 copies in Germany. In summary, The English Roses topped the book lists in Brazil, France, Slovenia and Taiwan. In its first-month, the book reached the half-million mark sold worldwide, and went on to sell a million copies by April 2005. It became the fastest-selling picture book by a debutant children's author.

== Critical response ==
The English Roses received moderate reviews after its release. Ayelet Waldman from Tablet questioned whether Rabbi Baal Shem Tov, whose morals were the inspiration behind Madonna's writing endeavors, did really ask "to be nice to pretty girls because their lives might be harder than ours." The reviewer noted Jewish influences in the story with the name Binah, and the character calling her father "papa" and wearing a "shmatte" on her head. Kate Kellaway of The Observer described the story as "written in language that veers between Hilaire Belloc and breakfast TV", finding the tone arch and strained but containing charm. She felt Fulvimari's illustrations made the book look like "a party invitation with his pictures of a garlanded, girly existence: each English rose a fashion-plate, with a doe-eyed stare, caught up in a whirl of blue butterflies, yellow clouds and fairydust." A reviewer for Publishers Weekly compared Fulvimari's illustrations to the images in Vogue while saying the story was preaching in nature.

David Sexton from the London Evening Standard criticized Madonna's decision to write the story, including making the character of Binah a beautiful looking girl, since he believed that in reality "the children who suffer wounding rejection from their peers are not the beautiful, the clever and the sporty, but the ugly, the dull and the awkward". The images were described as "sub-Warholian" and "distinctly perverse", with Sexton panning the characters for looking anorexic. Writing for The Guardian, poet and novelist Michael Rosen found The English Roses to be heavier on the moralistic side rather than being ironic, which he felt was the norm for children's books. In the same article, author Francesca Simon felt the book "has no characters, no story and there is no tension, which is a problem." Both criticized Fulvimari's illustrations with Rosen describing them as "odious pictures". Emily Nussbaum of New York magazine found Binah's character was "the blandest, most passive good-girl on Earth, the opposite of Madonna" and felt that by writing the book, the singer was in a way admonishing her older provocative self.

Madonna's narration was described by Ginny Dougary as "bossy". She also found parallels with the singer's childhood in The English Roses. Slate's Polly Shulman found the book to be "charmless, didactic" and egoistic since she felt it revolved around Madonna and her daughter. Shulman added that "The English Roses is a dull little thing, though not incompetent. Madonna does understand the basic structure of storytelling—perhaps too well", with multiple cliches present while making the titular characters "so passive that they might as well be good." David Kipen of the San Francisco Chronicle humorously said that the "last time a five-book series launched with such a bang, the first installment was called Genesis." Kipen found Madonna's characterization of Binah as a beautiful girl to be redundant, and her "inexplicable ostracism is exactly the kind of storytelling gaffe an inexperienced writer runs into when patching together an alter ego out of different, not altogether compatible phases in that writer's life." The reviewer described Fulvimari's drawings as a "witty, busy style that recalls the celebrated filigree of Ronald Searle, and the almond-eyed womanhood of the I Dream of Jeannie (1965) credit sequence."

== Aftermath and sequels ==
Madonna partnered with Signatures Network Inc. (SNI) and launched a series of merchandise and products related to The English Roses series available in the United States at Nordstrom department stores and boutiques. It included footwear, clothing apparel, rainwear, collectible dolls, tea sets, jewelry boxes, and calendars. From October 2004, Nordstrom created in-store programs themed around the books, including tea parties and fashion shows. Madonna also launched a website dedicated to the series, where the merchandise was available. The website was filled it with interactive games, downloadable wallpapers, character lists and feedback pages.

In September 2006, Madonna announced plans to release a sequel to the story, titled The English Roses: Too Good to be True. Another picture book, it was illustrated this time by Stacey Peterson. The hardcover first edition was published by Callaway on October 24, 2006. Madonna felt compelled to write the sequel at the suggestion of her daughter Lourdes. The story continues with the girls encountering their first romantic crush and the reader again learns a valuable lesson. The English Roses: Too Good to be True sold only 9,000 copies in the month following its release according to BookScan. Its lack of sales was attributed to Madonna being embroiled in a controversy over the adoption of her son David from Malawi. She continued publishing chapter books in the series, with another 12 books published from 2007 to 2008.

== See also ==
- List of literary works by number of translations
