= Callaway Arts & Entertainment =

American publishing company

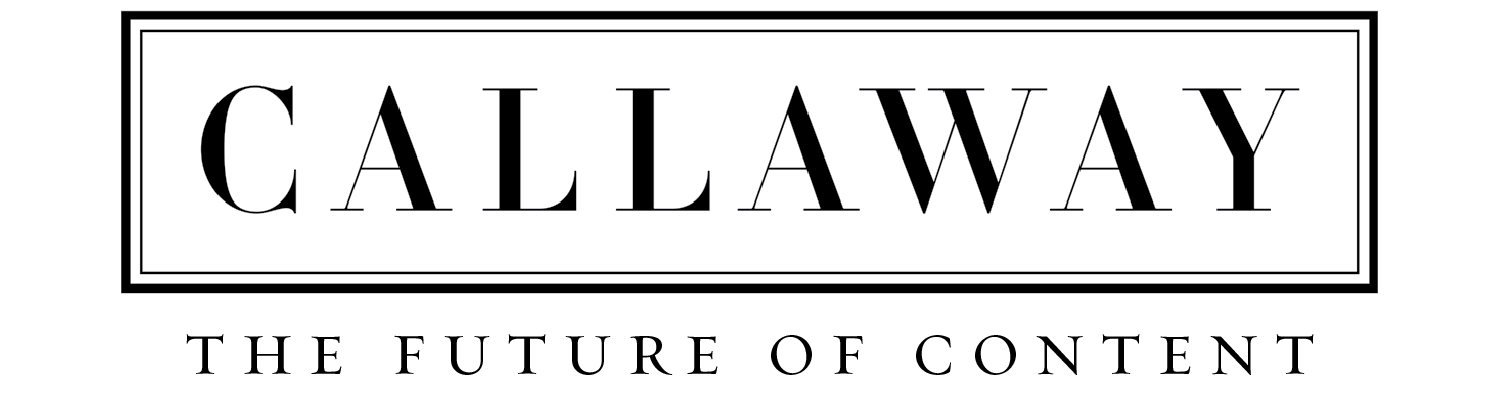
- Official logo
- Founded: 2003
- Founder: Nicholas Callaway
- Country of origin: United States
- Headquarters location: New York City
- Publication types: Books, digital apps
- Owner: Nicholas Callaway
- Official website: www.callaway.com

Callaway Arts & Entertainment is a company based in New York founded by Nicholas Callaway. It specializes in the design, production, and publication of illustrated books and multimedia products. The company is known for producing books by Madonna, including Sex (1992) and The English Roses (2003), as well as the Miss Spider series, created originally by David Kirk.

The company began publishing its own books in 2000, after acquiring its first imprint one year earlier. Originally called Callaway Editions, the company changed its name in 2005 to Callaway Arts & Entertainment to signify its change in direction.

== History ==
Callaway Editions was founded in 2003 by Nicholas Callaway. The company began by producing photography books, with the first of its books by artist Constantin Brâncuși. After producing Alfred Stieglitz: Photographs & Writings (1983), by Sarah Greenough and Juan Hamilton, the company began branching out by including books about design, sculpture and contemporary culture.

The company produced Madonna's coffee table book, Sex (1992), which was published by Warner Books. The book, which was accompanied by a CD, was part of a new strategy by publishers to attract customers. The single "Erotica" was included in the CD and served as promotional material for her album. The book sold 1.4 million copies, which made it the bestselling illustrated book in history, and also guaranteed some notoriety for the Callaway Editions.

With the help of Charles Melcher, Callaway Editions also produced in the same year Ferrington Guitars, its first product in the "BoundSound" series, which used the same strategy of selling the book alongside a CD. On November of the same year, the company announced Malcolm Speaks Out (1992), a "BoundSound" book with photos of Malcolm X and a CD with some of his speeches. The company was considered to be "at the forefront of the book-CD trend," and they believed that record stores would become an important section for selling books in this series.

In a 1999 profile by Fortune, the company's founder said their strategy was different from most other publishing companies. Instead of publishing a large amount of books hoping some will sell well, Callaway Editions instead focuses on a smaller number of titles, and "markets them like crazy." Madonna's book was one of the company's biggest sellers, at the mark of 1.4 million units worldwide, which marked it as the bestselling illustrated book in history at the time.

=== Publishing ===
In 2000, one year after acquiring Callaway Golf Media Venture, Callaway Editions moved from being a "book packager" to a publishing house. According to its founder, one of the reasons for the change was "the new channels of distribution", which would allow it to reach broader markets, while still serving the US region through specialty retailers. In its publishing list were included 20 titles, ranging from children's books to photography, fashion and art, among other areas. These also included books under their new imprint, Callaway Golfer.

That same year, the company's website was launched, and Callaway announced his company would soon begin working on e-books, focusing on titles for children.

The company changed its name to Callaway Arts & Entertainment in 2005, to signify the company's change of direction. Two years later, after having watched a speech by Steve Jobs and spending some time in Silicon Valley, Nicholas Callaway noticed the importance of technology for business. He then adopted a model he called "a platform-agnostic intellectual property and production company."

In 2011, Callaway said the company had stopped publishing books directly, instead choosing to license the company's titles to other publishers. This included the ending of his business that was responsible for selling products such as backpacks and watering cans. Callaway also said at the time that the company's intention when signing new books is to produce an interactive app, instead of a physical book.

In March 2026, Callaway filed for Chapter 11 bankruptcy protection, with court documents revealing that the company owed nearly $450,000 to Bob Dylan, as well as nearly $4 million to over 20 unpaid creditors. In April 2026, Callaway announced that it was seeking a buyer for a potential merger or sale of its assets. Callaway claimed it needed financing as one of its books, Bob Dylan: Mixing Up the Medicine, costed millions of dollars and over four years to produce. Additionally, they claimed that they filed for bankruptcy due to "predatory alternative lenders" that flooded the company with high debt loads.

== Imprints and divisions ==
=== Callaway & Kirk Company ===
In 1991, Callaway met David Kirk after buying one of his toys, "Sneaking Baby Alligator with Spinning Eyes". Callaway, who, at the time, was looking to expand the catalog of the company, saw Kirk's drawings in the toy's box and tracked him down to make a publishing deal. Kirk, who had been working as a toymaker for some years, mostly making toys for "Peter-Pan adults" and selling them for a higher price, also had been considering writing a children's book.

Kirk, whose idea to create Miss Spider came from his daughter's interest on insects, had already made a deal with Rizzoli International Publications, for $5,000 in advance, but Callaway offered a new deal of $20,000. After being rejected by several publishers, Scholastic accepted Callaway's terms of a large printing volume, in part due to the publisher's large distribution channels of schools and fairs. In 1994, the first Miss Spider book, called Miss Spider's Tea Party, was released.

The first book had a successful launch, with Madonna reading on a live broadcast in 1995. On that same year, the Callaway & Kirk Company was created to manage Kirk's creations. By 1999, they had already published eight children's books, with the most recent one being Nova's Ark (1999), which utilized 3D art for its illustrations, instead of the usual paintings. The book sold 400 thousand copies in its release year.

In 2003, a one-hour special was released on Nickelodeon, called Miss Spider's Sunny Patch Kids. The special, which aired on 31 March, was co-produced by Nelvana, and had actress Brooke Shields as the voice of Miss Spider. In September 2004, a new television show, Miss Spider's Sunny Patch Friends, debuted on the same channel, with a daily average viewership of around one million children. The show was the Nick Jr. Channel's highest rating premiere since 2001, when Bob the Builder premiered.

=== Callaway Golfer ===
In early 1998, it was announced that Callaway Editions and Callaway Golf Company, headed by Nicholas' father, Ely Callaway Jr., had created a new joint venture, called Callaway Golf Media Venture. The venture was focused on making and publishing books about golf with the help of well-known writers. On November of the same year, the Callaway Golf Company announced that, due to financial difficulties and after downsizing, they would be selling their shares of the venture to Callaway Editions.

During the acquisition, Nicholas Callaway announced the rebranding to Callaway Golfer, and would work as an imprint of the company. The company also retained part of the original board, which included Ed Brash and golfer journalist, Larry Dorman. The acquisition was finalized in April 1999, and its first books were published in 2000, coinciding with the company's change of direction to work as a full-on publisher.

=== Callaway Digital Arts ===
In August 2010, the company established the Callaway Digital Arts, Inc., with offices in New York City and San Francisco. This division is responsible for developing and publishing apps on the iPad. Callaway Digital Arts was funded after Apple's CEO, Steve Jobs, showed interest in a mobile app that had been released earlier in the year by Callaway Arts & Entertainment. The app was an interactive version of the Miss Spider's Tea Party book from 1994. Callaway Digital Arts received a total of $6 million in funding, which included financing by Ram Shriram and Mark Pincus.

One of its first partnerships was with a company headed by Martha Stewart, with whom Callaway struck a deal to publish some of her recipes on the iPad. They've also partnered with the company behind Sesame Street to release a digital version of the book The Monster at the End of this Book, as well as apps focused on the Thomas and Friends series.

In October 2011, the company announced the appointment of Rex Ishibashi as its CEO. In February 2012, it was announced that Lisa Holton, CEO and founder of Fourth Story Media had been named VP of content development for Callaway Digital Arts. This move was done to help develop an interactive educational program that was being funded by the Department of Education, but it also resulted in the acquisition of some properties that were held by Holton's former company.
