= List of the Fresh Beat Band episodes =

The Fresh Beat Band is an American preschool television series that was created by Scott Kraft and Nadine van der Velde. It originally premiered on Nickelodeon in the United States on August 24, 2009 and continued to air episodes on both Nickelodeon and the Nick Jr. Channel until December 7, 2013. The show had a total of three seasons comprising 60 episodes, as well as a concert special.

== Series overview ==
Season	Episodes	Originally released	
Season	Episodes	First released	Last released
1	20	August 24, 2009	May 28, 2010
2	20	August 30, 2010	July 24, 2011
3	20	June 24, 2011	December 7, 2013
Special		April 21, 2013	

== Episodes ==
=== Season 1 (2009–2010) ===
- This is the only season to feature Hadley Fraser as Reed.

No. overall	No. in season	Title	Original release date
1	1	"Stick Together"	August 24, 2009
The Fresh Beats decide to replace the wallpaper in the classroom to surprise Ms. Piccolo on her birthday. While putting up the paper, Kiki and Twist accidentally get stuck together by the wallpaper paste. They try to continue working, but it is difficult so Shout and Marina have to figure out a way to get them unstuck and finish the job in time for Ms. Piccolo's party.
2	2	"Stomp the House"	August 24, 2009
While practicing for her drum solo for today's big performance, Marina breaks her drumset. The Fresh Beats must scramble to find whatever materials they can find to make a drum set – a trashcan, lids, pipes and even a table.
3	3	"Doggone It"	August 25, 2009
Reed has lost his dog, Banjo, and asks the Fresh Beats to help him with the search. They chase Banjo all over town, and he keeps slipping away at the last second. The Fresh Beats and Reed finally figure out that Banjo can be lured by music. Depending on whether they play their music fast or slow, Banjo will either move towards them, or away from them.
4	4	"Loco Legs"	August 26, 2009
Shout is so excited to perform today that he has developed a case of "loco legs." The Fresh Beats come up with an ingenious plan that will enable them to perform together. They all do the loco legs dance.
5	5	"Let's Boogie"	August 27, 2009
The Fresh Beats are having trouble learning a dance that Kiki has choreographed. After a trip to the Groovy Smoothie, Melody teaches them that if you put it in a song, you can remember the steps a lot easier. The Fresh Beats follow her advice and are able to teach the dance to the Junior Beats.
6	6	"Quack Shoes"	August 31, 2009
It's Tap Dance Day at Music School. Shout is excited, and practices his tap dancing skills on the way to class. However, he gets a little too into the dancing. Shout winds up kicking his shoes off his feet, and they land in a tree. Shout needs shoes to tap in, so Marina loans him her duck slippers.
7	7	"Hippity Hop"	September 1, 2009
Melody is introducing a new line of carrot juice flavored smoothies and carrot cake at her shop. She asks Marina to wear a bunny suit to help promote it. Marina does not want to wear the bunny suit, because she just got her party dress she wanted to wear instead. She reluctantly agrees to wear the suit because Melody is a friend. To provide some moral support, Kiki, Shout, and Twist all dress as animals and come to the Groovy Smoothie to help out.
8	8	"Band Together"	September 2, 2009
The Fresh Beats are going to pick different instruments to play at music school today. Marina is going to play the xylophone, Shout is going to play the concertina, Kiki is going to play the cowbell, and Twist wants to play everything.
9	9	"Bounce in the House"	September 3, 2009
The Fresh Beats are deciding what song to play for their next concert. Twist wants to play something that goes really fast. He starts running around the apartments, and accidentally breaks Marina's drum, again. Shout, Kiki, and Marina try to convince Twist that he needs to slow down. Twist comes up with a different plan. He turns his room into a bouncy house. This way he can bounce around really fast and not worry about breaking anything. The plan works until Twist breaks Marina's drum the second time. Twist later stands up for Marina and stops the Junior Beats from running into the drum set on their way to the bouncy house.
10	10	"Hocus Pocus"	October 19, 2009
There is a talent show at school and Twist wants to do magic tricks. The others want to sing and dance, especially when the tricks do not work. In the end, the Fresh Beats perform with Twist's magic tricks.
11	11	"Freeze Dance"	October 20, 2009
It is too hot to practice for a dance party and the Fresh Beats decide to cool off with smoothies. Melody leaves them in charge of the shop and pretty soon they're making ice-cold smoothies that freeze everyone, which turns into a freeze dance.
12	12	"Sing With Me"	October 21, 2009
Kiki and Shout have to sing a duet for Music School. They are having trouble picking a song, because each one has a different idea of what they want to sing. Kiki wants to sing an opera song, while Shout wants to sing a rock "n" roll song. Twist and Marina have to figure out a way to help their friends come up with a compromise.
13	13	"Smoothies to Go-Go"	October 22, 2009
Kiki gets the idea to start a delivery service on her rollerskates, and finds herself way over her head in need of help from her friends.
14	14	"March Our Way"	January 11, 2010
The Fresh Beats are leading the school parade, with uniforms and marching band instruments. They have trouble marching in a straight line and morph into a hip-hop marching band and march, and dance, Fresh Beat style.
15	15	"Glow for It!"	January 12, 2010
It is the moonlight block party and everyone is decorating the street. The Fresh Beats start their show and all the lights go out. They make glow stick costumes and the party becomes a glow-in-the-dark extravaganza.
16	16	"Rock to Sleep"	January 13, 2010
Shout gets a bugle in his favorite box of cereal. He plays with it all day, and even into the night. Shout knows it is time to go to sleep, but he cannot help himself. He keeps playing his new bugle. Kiki, Marina, and Twist all want to go to sleep, but Shout's constant bugle playing is driving them nuts. The three of them have to work together to figure out a way to get Shout to sleep.
17	17	"Rhyme Time"	January 14, 2010
Twist is practicing his rapping skills. When he cannot find anything that rhymes with the word music, he accidentally loses his voice. Kiki, Marina, and Shout console Twist, and try to help him figure out a way to get his voice back. They decide to try finding a word that rhymes with music on their own.
18	18	"Hip Hop Hoedown"	March 5, 2010
The Fresh Beats are getting ready to play some country music. They head to the Good Note Music Store to get some country music instruments from Reed. While Kiki, Shout, and Marina pick their items out before the show starts, Twist has trouble finding one for himself. He keeps picking different instruments, but none of them have a country music sound to them. The day of the performance arrives, and Twist has nothing to play, and the other Fresh Beats do not want to perform without him. Melody and Reed come up with the idea of Twist being the square dance caller.
19	19	"Bubble Blast"	April 22, 2010
It is "Clean & Green Day", and the Fresh Beats are cleaning the street. However, Shout would rather play music, so they all build a bubble making music cleaning machine, using discarded woodwind instrument parts they got from Reed.
20	20	"Rock the Luau"	May 28, 2010
The Fresh Beats are getting ready to perform at a Hawaiian Luau. After picking up their instruments from Reed, they start practicing. Marina starts to get worried when her hips start shaking and the rest of her body starts dancing without her in control of her own body. She tries to figure out how to control it, but it keeps happening every time she hears Hawaiian music. At the Luau, Melody explains to the group that Marina is dancing the hula, and that her body has a story to tell. This marks the only time Twist, Shout and Kiki wear flip-flops on their feet and also Marina wears just regular sandals.

=== Season 2 (2010–2011) ===
- Patrick Levis replaces Hadley Fraser as Reed.
- This is the last season to feature Shayna Rose as Marina.

No. overall	No. in season	Title	Original release date
21	1	"Circus Mojo"	August 30, 2010
The circus has arrived in town. Reed, who is working there, tells the Fresh Beats that one of the buses carrying the performers has broken down, leaving them short-handed. The Fresh Beats lend a hand by assisting to set up the circus tent. However, Reed alerts them that they may have to cancel the circus because there aren't enough performers to complete the acts. Knowing that the Junior Beats and everyone in town would be very disappointed if the circus gets canceled, the Fresh Beats decide to step in and perform the acts themselves. However, they only have a limited amount of time to practice before the show begins.
22	2	"Honk Honk"	August 31, 2010
The Fresh Beats decide it is time to get their own car. They go on the computer, and design the car themselves. The delivery person arrives with their car, but it is in over 50 different boxes. Now, the Fresh Beats have to figure out how to put the car together on their own.
23	3	"Camping with the Stars"	September 1, 2010
The Fresh Beats decide to go on a camping trip. On the trip, they will only be able to use acoustic instruments since there is no electricity in the woods. Twist has a hard time figuring that part out. He keeps wanting to bring various appliances, but the gang reminds him there is no place to plug them in. Also while, they are camping, the Fresh Beats witness a shooting star.
24	4	"Singin' in the Rain"	September 2, 2010
Marina is trying to write a new song, but cannot think of a topic. After a shower passes through, Marina decides to write about the rain. She develops a case of writer's block, so Kiki, Twist, and Shout try to help by re-creating the sound of rain. They also want to figure out if the TV weatherman is listening in on their conversation, a charge he denies.
25	5	"Back to School"	September 15, 2010
It is their first day back at music school and the Fresh Beats reminisce about their favorite songs. They cannot decide on just one, so they decide to make an awesome, new back-to-school song.
26	6	"Giant Pumpkin"	October 25, 2010
Shout picks a giant pumpkin for the Fall Festival but it is too big to move by himself. So the Fresh Beats work together to move it. They get to the festival in time and perform as a quartet with their giant pumpkin.
27	7	"Fresh Beats in Toyland"	December 13, 2010
In a special holiday episode, the Fresh Beat Band members are all toys. Twist is dancing robot, Shout is a superhero, Kiki is a ballerina, and Marina is a cowgirl.
28	8	"Zydeco Music Parade"	March 7, 2011
The Fresh Beats are going on a road trip to the Zydeco Music Parade. Because, they could not all fit in the same vehicle, Kiki and Marina go on ahead in the Fresh Beats' car with the decorations for the float. Meanwhile, Reed drives Twist and Shout in his delivery truck carrying the group's instruments. Reed's truck breaks down, so Twist and Shout have to ride on to the parade on a bicycle. Meanwhile, Marina and Kiki have to find makeshift instruments for the band to play in the parade before it starts.
29	9	"Kiki's Kickin' Chorus"	March 8, 2011
Kiki has come up with a new song, but feels something is not exactly right. The Fresh Beats figure out that what they need are more voices. With the help of Reed, they proceed to go around town listening for people that can sing, including Melody, Ms. Piccolo, a delivery lady, a painter, a balloon man, a group of gardeners, and the Junior Beats, and then inviting them to be a part of the chorus.
30	10	"Car Wash Dance"	March 9, 2011
Kiki is trying to choreograph a new dance that she hopes everyone will want to do. After Twist is unable to save the Fresh Beats' car from a tray of flying smoothies, the band decides it is time for them to wash their vehicle before the Farmer's Market. While washing the car, Kiki does not realize that she has created the Car Wash Dance.
31	11	"The Case of the Missing Violin"	March 10, 2011
The Fresh Beats run into the music group, Nuttin' But Stringz, in the park. They are getting ready for a concert, and invite the Fresh Beats to join them. The Fresh Beats race back to their apartments to get Kiki's favorite violin before the concert starts. However, when they arrive, they find it missing. Never fear, Twist and his trusty magnifying glass are on the case.
32	12	"Band in a Jam"	May 27, 2011
The Fresh Beats are going to see Ne-Yo in concert. They get locked in a storage room at the concert venue. While trying to figure out how to get out, they flash back to how they got together as kids. They eventually get out, and join Ne-Yo on stage.
33	13	"Balloon Buddy"	July 3, 2011
An ordinary balloon seems to have a mind of its own, and follows the Fresh Beats all around town of the Conga line. This leads to the group adopting him as a mascot, and Twist naming him "Buddy".
34	14	"Presto Pants"	July 3, 2011
The Fresh Beats need to practice for a dance performance, but they also want to play basketball. Their presto Pants help them do a super-fast basketball dance.
35	15	"Mixed Up Musical"	July 10, 2011
Twist and Shout wake up wearing one another's clothes. Marina and Kiki also wake wearing one another's clothes. After changing into the right clothes, the Fresh Beats have to come up with an idea for a musical for school. They come across Reed and Melody, whose deliveries have been mixed up. Then when they go to find costumes, those are mixed up as well. The Fresh Beats then decide that the topic should be their mixed up day.
36	16	"Drum Party"	July 10, 2011
Kiki, Shout, and Twist are planning a surprise birthday party for Marina. For a birthday gift, they each decide to get her a drum, and are unaware that the other two are getting her the same thing.
37	17	"Step It Up"	July 17, 2011
There is a stomp dance competition. Kiki is asked to be on one team, while Twist and Shout are asked to be on another. Marina stays to the side on this one. Kiki and Marina figure out that no matter who wins the competition someone's feelings might get hurt. They decide to come up with a way that both teams could perform together.
38	18	"Follow the Leader"	July 17, 2011
Twist loves being the conductor of the school orchestra, but he needs to be a better listener too. Shout, Marina, and Kiki help him to listen to the music so then he can conduct them correctly.
39	19	"Jungle Jazz"	July 24, 2011
Twist rescues a plant and brings it back to his apartment. Unbeknownst to the Fresh Beats, the plant grows every time it hears scat music. Twist has been listening to lots of scat music, and sings it in his sleep. The next morning, The Fresh Beats wake up to discover that the little plant has grown considerably, and has turned their lobby into a jungle.

=== Season 3 (2011–2013) ===
- New character "Harper" is introduced – he runs the Singing Pizza Cafe.
- Tara Perry replaces Shayna Rose as Marina.

No. overall	No. in season	Title	Original release date
40	1	"Graduation Day"	June 24, 2011
The Fresh Beats are getting ready for their graduation from Music School. While setting up for their performance, they start thinking about what they want to be when they grow up. Everyone has a plan except for Marina, who is undecided. They pitch different ideas to her, but nothing seems to be working out. The Fresh Beats also figure out that by graduating and moving on to other careers means that they will not be a band anymore.
41	2	"Giant Pizza"	June 24, 2011
Twist smells a new mysterious aroma in the park. The smell is pizza. Marina, Shout, and Kiki follow Twist's nose to the source. The Fresh Beats meet Harper, who has just moved to town, and is opening the Singing Pizza Café. Harper is in need of help getting ready for his grand opening, which is also Pizza and Pirate Day. The Fresh Beats volunteer to help him out by dressing as pirates and passing out both flyers and free samples. When he gets more customers than he bargained for, the Fresh Beats have to help Harper figure out a way to get more pizza to the customers.
42	3	"Cool Pool Party"	July 8, 2011
The Fresh Beats are getting ready to throw a pool party for all their friends. After setting up, Kiki, Shout, and Marina decide to jump into the water. Unfortunately, their splash was so big, it knocked all the water out of the pool. Now they have to find a way to fill the pool back up before the guests arrive.
43	4	"Ghost Band"	October 24, 2011
The Fresh Beats are invited to perform a concert in a western town. When they arrive, they find out the town is haunted by the Ghost Band. The Ghost Band does not want any other band performing in their town so they have scared all the others away. The Ghost Band does their best to try to scare the Fresh Beats off. The Fresh Beats refuse to back down, and face off against the Ghost Band in a series of three challenges. The losing band leaves town.
44	5	"Veloci-Rap-Star"	November 4, 2011
After performing a song at the Singing Pizza Cafe, a talent agent named Max approaches Twist. He offers Twist the opportunity for a chance to become a big rap star by performing in his very own rap concert. Twist is not sure he wants to, and asks his friends what they think. Kiki, Shout, and Marina do not want Twist to leave, but at the same time they do not want to stand in his way either, so they tell him to go for it. Twist embarks on a big media campaign. However, on the night of the concert, Max reveals that it is going to be an entire tour, not just one concert. He also wants Twist to join the Dinosaur Band as its new Veloci-Rap Star.
45	6	"Chimps in Charge"	November 11, 2011
Harper asks the Fresh Beats to babysit a pair of chimpanzees, Chewy and Bingo, for him. They think it is going to be easy, but they prove to be more than a handful. Shout and Twist take Chewy, while Kiki and Marina take Bingo to their respective apartments for a nap. While, the Fresh Beats sleep, the chimps proceed to escape and cause chaos along the street and get worse. The Band wakes up, and realizes they need to find a way to get Chewy and Bingo under control. Marina and Twist come up with the idea of building a jungle gym.
46	7	"Dance Floor Superhero"	November 18, 2011
Shout comes across the newest edition of the Mighty Music Band comic book. He calls the others, and they agree to meet at the Singing Pizza Café to read it together. Harper informs them that it is Mighty Music Band Day at the café, and asks if they would wear the costumes and serve the pizzas. The Fresh Beats oblige him. They suddenly hear a guitar riff, and head outside. Someone has frozen Melody, Reed, Harper, The Junior Beats, and other townspeople. After trying to unfreeze their friends on their own, the Fresh Beats run into the villain Deep Freeze (guest star Nikki Blonsky). Deep Freeze thinks that they are the real Mighty Music Band, and dares them to stop her. The Fresh Beats then learn that their costumes come with real superpowers.
47	8	"Rock Star"	November 25, 2011
Marina wants Kiki, Twist, and Shout to play the Rock Star board game with her. They are hesitant at first, because she has a habit of trying to cheat. They will play, but only if she agrees to play by the rules this time. The Fresh Beats play, and right away Marina starts bending the rules. After making her play correctly, Twist, Kiki, and Shout have their turns. When Marina gets her second turn, she deliberately bumps the table, and lands on the black and white swirl square. While she did not play by the rules, the Fresh Beats are curious as to what happens when you land on the black and white swirl square, because no one ever has before. The Fresh Beats wind up getting zapped inside the board game itself.
48	9	"Bollywood Beats"	December 2, 2011
The Fresh Beats are preparing to perform at the Indian Festival that has come to town. While looking at instruments at Reed's Good Note Music Store, they manage to release a magic genie and his associates. The genie agrees to give them four wishes, but first he smells pizza. The Fresh Beats find the genie and his crew at the Singing Pizza Café. The Fresh Beats want their concert at the Festival to be their best show ever. The problem is when they make their wishes, the genie does not understand their modern slang or figures of speech, and takes things quite literally.
49	10	"The Fresh Bots"	December 9, 2011
After a session in the recording studio, Twist and Marina are each trying to remember something they forgot. Twist remembers that he promised Melody they would help her pick berries for her smoothies. Marina remembers that she promised Harper that they would help him make sauce for his pizzas. This leads to them pondering how are they going to be in two places at one. Twist gets the idea to use robots. Shout calls "Robots to Go", and orders four robots to help them. The robots look just like the Fresh Beats themselves leading Kiki to dub them the "Fresh Bots." Chaos ensues as instead of helping, the Fresh Bots make things worse.
50	11	"The Wizard of Song"	January 27, 2012
The Fresh Beats are getting ready for a concert at the Singing Pizza Café. Marina is bored and does not want to rehearse anymore. She decides to take a break, and go cruising for cupcakes in the Fresh Beats' car. In a spoof of the Wizard of Oz, she gets swept up in a tornado, and arrives in a far away land. She meets the Good Witch (guest star Sarah Chalke), who sends her on a path to see the Wizard of Song. She meets three friends along the way, who look sort of like her old ones; the Scarecrow (Twist), the Tin Woman (Kiki), and the Cowardly Lion (Shout). The Bad Witch (Melody) tries to prevent Marina and her new friends from reaching the Wizard of Song (guest star Jason Mraz) by placing them under a sleep spell using flowers in a field along the road. The Scarecrow (Twist) gets the idea to start a pillow fight to keep them from falling asleep. They eventually make it through the field, and get to see the Wizard of Song. The Wizard agrees to grant their wishes, but first they have to go back to the Bad Witch, and bring him back some of her cupcakes.
51	12	"Royal Wedding"	February 10, 2012
Everyone in town is excited, because there is going be a royal wedding. The Princess (Erin Sanders) arrives first, and informs everyone that the wedding is off because she is not in love with the Prince. The Fresh Beats invite her to stay at their apartments in order to sort things out. While moving her luggage, Twist keeps falling over things. The Princess finds Twist very funny, and decides he is the one she should marry. Twist has no intention of getting married, and runs away from her. Meanwhile, the Prince arrives and searches for The Princess. Kiki, Shout, and Marina intend to help the Prince win the Princess back by proving he can be just as funny as Twist. The problem is the Prince does not know how to be funny.
52	13	"Keeping It Green"	April 20, 2012
Shout and Kiki are playing a game of football against Marina and Twist in the park. The Junior Beats invite them to join them in a game of croquet. While playing, Mayor Fletcher and a land developer drive in a golf cart right through the game on a golf cart. Mayor Fletcher tells the Fresh Beats that they are ripping up the park to make way for a new office building. The Fresh Beats do not want to see the park torn down, so they first try a few ways to hold off construction. They then hold a big concert to try to convince Mayor Fletcher to change her mind.
53	14	"Yo! Fresh Beats Go Gabba Gabba!"	June 8, 2012
The Fresh Beats are sitting in the Singing Pizza Café listening to Harper's new promotional idea when they get a surprise visit from D.J. Lance Rock and the rest of the gang from Gabbaland. They are on their way to a beach party where Toodee is, but Plex has developed a case of the hiccups, and has been beaming them to all sorts of different places except the beach. After a joint musical number, Plex starts hiccuping again, they learned that a gear named Gearmo has been causing a huge racket and occurs Plex's hiccups and making Plex beaming The Fresh Beats and the Gabbas to different places, Plex, zaps both the Fresh Beats and the Gabbas to different places around the world. The Fresh Beats and the Gabbas have to work together to fix Plex, stop Gearmo from causing trouble and Plex's hiccups escaping from them and get to the beach party. Note: This is a crossover episode of Yo Gabba Gabba!. Note 2: This is the last episode to air on the main Nickelodeon channel.
54	15	"Hoop Dreams"	August 19, 2012
The Junior Beats are getting ready for their first basketball game. The Fresh Beats are coming to the game to cheer them on and perform at halftime. When they find the Junior Beats practicing in the middle of the street, the Fresh Beats decide to build a basketball court for their young counterparts. The day of the big game arrives, and the opposing team does not show up. Not wanting to disappoint the Junior Beats, the Fresh Beats put on basketball jerseys and agree to play them. The Fresh Beats planned to take it easy on the Junior Beats, but the Junior Beats have other ideas. Note: Starting with this episode, new episodes premiere on the Nick Jr. Channel.
55	16	"Dance-A-Thon"	October 14, 2012
Harper is hosting an all night Dance-A-Thon at the Singing Pizza Cafe. The grand prize is all the money in a giant piggy bank. All four Fresh Beats enter the contest. The rules are you must keep dancing at all times, no leaving the Singing Pizza Cafe, and no sleeping on the dance floor. The last one still dancing wins. For the music, they play various Fresh Beat Band videos, which are really highlights of dance numbers from the past season and episode.
56	17	"Laughing Dance Master"	February 10, 2013
The whole town is getting ready for the Dragon Festival. The Fresh Beats go to audition, but get turned down by Bobbi, the Dragon Festival's director. They ask for a second chance, and if Bobbi knows of anyone that can help. She sends them to the Laughing Dance Master. The Fresh Beats seek out the Laughing Dance Master's wisdom. However, instead of teaching them how to dance for the Dragon Festival, he has them do chores around his house.
57	18	"Pink Swan"	October 13, 2013
Kiki is nervous about auditioning for the Pink Swan ballet (In a spoof to the ballet Swan Lake). The other Fresh Beats and Harper decide to go along and audition as well. Kiki does very well, but the others had their struggles. The director (guest star Wayne Brady) chooses Kiki for the lead role, but she has to learn how to do five turns in a row. Meanwhile, with Kiki being in the ballet, the Fresh Beats recruit Reed to fill in for Kiki on the guitar.
58	19	"Snow Day"	December 7, 2013
When the Fresh Beats use a giant blender to make snow for their winter show, they end up covering the entire town with snow.

=== Special (2013) ===
Title	Original release date
"Concert Special"	April 21, 2013
A stand-alone special taking a behind the scenes look at the Fresh Beat Band's live tour.
