= Fresh Beat Band of Spies =

Animated television series spin-off from "The Fresh Beat Band"

- Genre: Children's music; Action-adventure; Science fiction; Comedy; Animated sitcom
- Created by: Scott Kraft; Nadine van der Velde
- Based on: The Fresh Beat Band by Scott Kraft and Nadine van der Velde
- Developed by: Michael Ryan
- Directed by: Chuck Sheetz
- Creative director: Gary Janetti
- Voices of: Jon Beavers; Yvette Gonzalez-Nacer; Thomas Hobson; Tara Perry; Tom Kenny; Keith Silverstein
- Theme music composer: Peter Zizzo
- Opening theme: "Fresh Beat Band of Spies Theme Song" performed by Andy Sturmer and Katy Perry
- Ending theme: "Great Day Remix" performed by Andy Sturmer and Katy Perry
- Composers: Stuart Kollmorgen; Matter Music (Note: A team of music composers consisting of Ric Markmann, Dan Pinnella and Christopher Wagner); Peter Zizzo
- Countries of origin: United States; Canada
- Original language: English
- No. of seasons: 1
- No. of episodes: 20

Production
- Executive producers: Scott Kraft; Nadine van der Velde
- Producers: Jeannine Hodson; Laurie Handforth
- Running time: 23 minutes
- Production companies: Nelvana Limited; 6point2 Nickelodeon Animation Studio

Original release
- Network: Nickelodeon (2015); Nick Jr. Channel (2015−2016)
- Release: June 15, 2015 – February 24, 2016

Related
- The Fresh Beat Band

Fresh Beat Band of Spies is an animated children's television series originally airing on Nickelodeon and the Nick Jr. Channel. Produced by Nickelodeon Animation Studio and 6 Point Harness in California, and Nelvana Limited in Canada, it is a spin-off of Nickelodeon's live-action series The Fresh Beat Band. The series was created by Nadine van der Velde and Scott Kraft (the creators of the original live-action series) and developed by Michael Ryan. Yvette Gonzalez-Nacer, Thomas Hobson, Tara Perry, and Jon Beavers reprise their roles as Kiki, Shout, Marina, and Twist, respectively, while Tom Kenny replaces Patrick Levis as Reed, and Keith Silverstein also joins the cast.

Kraft and der Velde served as executive producers, Jeannine Hodson and Laurie Handforth served as producers, and Chuck Sheetz served as the primary director, with Ian Freedman and Mike Sheill respectively directing the final two episodes. The writing staff included Michael Ryan, Hadley Klein, Kevin Sullivan, David Lewman, Tom Krajewski, Gary Janetti, Analise McNeill, Anne Fryer, and the duos of Evan Gore and Heather Lombard, and Andy Rheingold and Ray DeLaurentis.

20 episodes were produced. The series aired from June 15, 2015 to February 24, 2016.

== Premise ==
The Fresh Beat Band, now a group of spies, solve mysteries in their town using their individual talents and unique gadgets.

== Characters ==
=== Main ===
- Kiki (voiced by Yvette Gonzalez-Nacer) is the band's guy guitarist and lead singer who owns a local hair salon. She has a jetpack and a scooter.
- Shout (voiced by Thomas Hobson) is the athletic keyboardist and team of the spy team who is also the lifeguard at a nearby swimming pool. Whenever Reed sends the spies on a mission, Shout says "Time to spy it up!"
- Marina (voiced by Tara Perry) is the brainy drummer of the spy team who is the chemist for a bakery. Her catchphrase is "Brainstorm!" which she says whenever she has an idea.
- Twist (voiced by Jon Beavers) is the comedic disc jockey of the team whose day leader is as the manager of the Pet Daycare Center. He uses a pogo stick as a vehicle.
- Bo Monkey (voiced by Tom Kenny) is Twist's best friend, a monkey who helps him operate the pet center. He does not speak, but communicates through monkey noises that reflect his emotions.
- Reed (voiced by Tom Kenny) is the team's "gadget guy" who wears glasses. He tends to suddenly appear out of nowhere, due to hiding in or behind various objects, which startles the other team members. He is the only recurring character from the original series to return.
- Commissioner Goldstar (voiced by Keith Silverstein) is the friendly but hapless chief of police. He appears after the spies completed their missions, usually to congratulate the team on their successes.

=== Recurring ===
- Lily (voiced by Heaven White) is Commissioner Goldstar's niece and a good friend of the Fresh Beats. She has a pet dog named Goldie and plays on Shout's baseball team.
- Lil Piggie is a pig with a hot pink mohawk and one of the many animals living at Twist's pet center. He is a friend of the Fresh Beats.
- Three Direction is a parody of the band One Direction.

=== Villains ===
- Champ Von Champ Von Winnerchamp (also voiced by Tom Kenny) is a muscular recurring villain who steals and cheats for various objects, such as trophies, wrestling belts and party supplies. He speaks with a German accent and is assisted by his own cheer squad for stealing stuff.
- Captain Arrrgh (also voiced by Tom Kenny) is a singing pirate who steals treasure with the help of his chicken, Poulet, and his second-in-command, First Mate.
- Yi-Haw (voiced by Kate Higgins) is a cowgirl and outlaw who hopes to surpass her outlaw ancestor by stealing buildings from all over town.
- Squee Z. Dumpkins (voiced by Tara Strong) is a famous internet celebrity known for her cuteness.

=== Others ===
- Spooky Spooks (voiced by Eden Riegel) - is a ghost girl, this scary who dreams of becoming a rock star.

== Production ==
The series was first announced in March 2014. In August of the same year, it was announced that Nickelodeon was currently in production on the show and it was slated for a 2015 release. From November 2014 until February 2015, several songs from Fresh Beat Band of Spies episodes were performed as part of "The Fresh Beat Band: Greatest Hits Live" tour; products such as posters and T-shirts featuring the cartoon Fresh Beat characters were sold at these concerts.

== Episodes ==
No.	Title	Directed by	Written by	Original release date	Prod. code	US viewers (millions)
1	"The WOW Factor"	Chuck Sheetz	Michael Ryan	June 15, 2015 (Nick Jr. Channel) June 29, 2015 (Nickelodeon)	101	0.68
A singer named Sindy Sauernotes (voiced by guest star Tia Mowry) attempts to steal a crown at a music awards show. Songs: Here We Go, We're Unstoppable, Friend Like You, March Our Way, Just Like A Rockstar
2	"Trophy Trouble"	Chuck Sheetz	Evan Gore & Heather Lombard	June 17, 2015 (Nick Jr. Channel) June 30, 2015 (Nickelodeon)	104	N/A
Champ Von Champ Von Winnerchamp (voiced by Tom Kenny) tries to steal all the trophies in the town. Songs: Get Up & Go Go, Here We Go, Let's Go Banana, We're Unstoppable
3	"Mummy Mayhem"	Chuck Sheetz	Hadley Klein	June 18, 2015 (Nick Jr. Channel) July 1, 2015 (Nickelodeon)	102	0.61
A treasure hunter named Arizona Jones (voiced by guest star Jerry O'Connell) sets his sights on an ancient Egyptian artifact. Songs: Beast With The Beat, Walk Like An Egyptian
4	"Rocketship Alien"	Chuck Sheetz	Evan Gore & Heather Lombard	June 22, 2015 (Nick Jr. Channel) July 2, 2015 (Nickelodeon)	103	0.48
A stranded extraterrestrial is found at the local amusement park. Songs: Here We Go, Music Keep Me Moving, Home
5	"Fruit Racer Game"	Chuck Sheetz	Hadley Klein	June 23, 2015	105	0.63
Twist, Shout and Marina must free Kiki when she gets zapped inside the Angry Fruit Racers arcade game. Songs: Let's Go Banana
6	"Singing Pirate"	Chuck Sheetz	Andy Rheingold & Ray DeLaurentis	June 24, 2015	106	0.48
Captain Arrrgh takes a valuable emerald. Songs: Music Keep Me Moving, Great Day, Here We Go, Every Pirate Has To Dance
7	"Werewolf Hairwolf"	Chuck Sheetz	Hadley Klein	June 25, 2015	107	N/A
Twist, Reed, Bo and the townspeople are turned into werewolves by an evil hair stylist, Mojo Fauxhawk (voiced by Tom Kenny). Songs: We're Unstoppable, Get Up & Go Go, Party Animal
8	"Masked Wrestler"	Chuck Sheetz	Evan Gore & Heather Lombard	June 26, 2015	108	0.65
Champ Von Champ Von Winnerchamp becomes a wrestler and cheats to win championship belts. Songs: I Can Do Anything
9	"Cute Crook"	Chuck Sheetz	Kevin Sullivan	June 29, 2015	109	0.58
A villain named Squee Z. Dumpkins (voiced by Tara Strong) plans to make the ultimate viral video by stealing cute pets. Songs: DJ Get The Party Started, So Cute
10	"Wild Outlaw"	Chuck Sheetz	Hadley Klein	July 1, 2015	112	0.56
A fugitive cowgirl outlaw named Yi-Haw (voiced by Kate Higgins) attempts to steal buildings from the Spies' city. Songs: Fresh Beats In Town
11	"Bo Birthday Bash"	Chuck Sheetz	David Lewman	July 3, 2015	111	0.39
Champ Von Champ Von Winnerchamp steals Bo Monkey's entire birthday party and more parties in the city. Songs: Friend Like You, Here For You
12	"Fake Fresh Beats"	Chuck Sheetz	Evan Gore & Heather Lombard	July 27, 2015	113	0.63
The Fresh Beats must prove to Commissioner Goldstar and the rest of the city that they have been framed for two robberies by a group of villains, Rubberface Rudy (voiced by Khary Payton), Captain Arrrgh, Yi-Haw and Champ Von Champ Von Winnerchamp. Songs: Here We Go, Here For You
13	"Dance Bot"	Chuck Sheetz	Tom Krajewski	July 28, 2015	114	0.40
The Fresh Beats have to stop a villainous inventor named Dakota Koder (voiced by Cree Summer) from rampaging through the city with her robot. Songs: Get Up & Go Go, Dance It Off
14	"Band Of Pirate"	Chuck Sheetz	Dave Lewman	July 29, 2015	115	0.40
Captain Arrrgh and First Mate use half of a stolen pirate map to dig holes around the town in search of the valuable treasure of Captain McPlunder. Songs: Here We Go, Spy It Up, Every Pirate Has To Dance
15	"Frozen Fresh Beats"	Chuck Sheetz	Tom Krajewski	September 21, 2015	116	0.54
The Fresh Beat Band of Spies have to save summer, thanks to a villainous Viking (voiced by Nolan North) who freezes the town. Songs: Another Perfect Day, Get Up & Go Go, Spy It Up, Freeze Dance
16	"Bunnies Goes Banana"	Chuck Sheetz	Hadley Klein	September 23, 2015	117	0.36
A heap of bunnies inadvertently create a gigantic banana monster. Songs: Let's Go Banana, So Cute, Spy It Up, DJ Get The Party Started
17	"Ghost Of Rock"	Chuck Sheetz	Tom Krajewski	October 19, 2015	110	0.59
The spies encounter a rockstar ghost named Spooky Spooks (voiced by Eden Riegel) inside a haunted theater. Songs: Here For You, Friend Like You, Just Like A Rockstar
18	"Christmas 2.0"	Chuck Sheetz	Analise McNeill	December 14, 2015	118	0.50
The spies stop an out-of-control present delivery machine from ruining Christmas. David Krumholtz guest stars as Santa Claus. Songs: Deck The Hall, The Christmas In You
19	"Sneaky Sneaker"	Ian Freedman	Gary Janetti	February 22, 2016	119	N/A
Two villainous basketball players trick Reed into giving them Shout's robotic sneakers can they got them back. Songs: I Can Do Anything, Get Up & Go Go, Cheer
20	"Fresh Beat Babies"	Mike Sheill	Anne Fryer	February 24, 2016	120	N/A
The spies find out that Commissioner Goldstar has been turned into a baby by Squee Z. Dumpkins. Will the band save the day or will the whole town be turned into babies? Songs: So Cute, So Cute (Remix)

== Broadcast ==
Fresh Beat Band of Spies aired on both Nickelodeon and the Nick Jr. Channel in the United States. It previewed on the Nick Jr. Channel on June 15, 2015, before premiering on Nickelodeon on June 29. The first eleven episodes were put on Nickelodeon's schedule throughout late July 2015, but only the first four episodes ended up airing on the main network.

Internationally, the series was first shown on Nick Jr. Canada on September 7, 2015. It also aired on Treehouse TV. The series debuted on Nick Jr. in Germany, Austria, and Switzerland on January 11, 2016, in Italy on January 18, 2016, in the Middle East and North Africa on January 25, 2016, and in Australia on February 1, 2016. The series premiered on Nick Jr. UK on February 5, 2016.

== Reception ==
=== Critical response ===
The series has received generally positive reviews from critics. Common Sense Media reviewer Emily Ashby gave the show four out of five stars, praising the show's use of "quirky villains" rather than "real scares." In October 2015, USA Today listed the series as one of the twenty-five best family programs of the year.

=== Accolades ===
The episode "Singing Pirate" was nominated for "Outstanding Achievement, Production Design in an Animated TV/Broadcast Production" in the 43rd Annie Awards. The series was also the recipient of a 2016 Parents' Choice Award.

Awards and nominations
Year	Award	Category	Nominee	Result	Refs
2016	43rd Annie Awards	Outstanding Achievement, Production Design in an Animated TV/Broadcast Production	Ernie Gilbert (for "Singing Pirate")	Nominated	
2016	Parents' Choice Awards	"Fun Stuff" Award	Nickelodeon	Won	
