= Nadine van der Velde =

Canadian actress

- Born: Toronto, Ontario, Canada
- Occupations: Actress, writer, producer
- Years active: 1983–present
- Spouse: Scott Kraft (m. 1992)
- Children: 2

Nadine van der Velde is a Canadian actress, writer, and producer. She is a three-time Emmy award winner, two-time Annie Award winner and a recipient of a Humanitas Award.

== Early life ==
Nadine was born in Toronto. She is fluent in French. She made her film debut in 1983 in the film Private School. She later starred in the 1986 comedy horror Critters and 1987 film Munchies. Her acting credits include several TV series including: Silver Spoons, Otherworld, The New Alfred Hitchcock Presents and JAG.

== Career ==
Nadine has executive produced, story edited and written for several TV series including Miss Spider's Sunny Patch Friends, 65 episodes of Rolie Polie Olie, and 44 episodes of Breaker High. She co-wrote the indie feature East of A, which screened in over two dozen film festivals, including the Seattle Film Fest, Stockholm, Dublin, Outfest and San Francisco. Van der Velde partnered with her husband, Scott Kraft, and created the development and production company Popskull Inc. which has Van der Velde as co-creator and executive producer of Nickelodeon's The Fresh Beat Band, which first aired on 2009. Van der Velde has written and music produced over 60 songs on the series. Nadine van der Velde was nominated for a 2012 Daytime Emmy in Outstanding Achievement in Main Title and Graphic Design for the show’s season 3 main titles.

Nadine has been nominated for two 2013 Daytime Emmys in the categories of "OUTSTANDING PRE-SCHOOL CHILDREN'S SERIES" and "OUTSTANDING ACHIEVEMENT" in MUSIC DIRECTION and COMPOSITION for her work as Executive Producer on The Fresh Beat Band. On June 14, 2013 Nadine van der Velde and The Fresh Beat Band team won a Daytime Emmy for Music Direction and Composition.

== Filmography ==
Actress
Year	Title	Role	Notes
1983	Private School	School Girl	
1983	Silver Spoons	Michele	1 episode - Passports to Pleasure
1984	Fatal Vision	Randi	TV miniseries
1985	Otherworld	Girl	1 episode - The Zone Troopers Build Men
1985	Moving Violations	Stephanie Mc Carty	
1985	CBS Schoolbreak Special	Mary Kay	1 episode - The War Between the Classes
1986	Critters	April Brown	(credited as Nadine Van Der Velde)
1986	The Wizard	Jennifer Dunne	1 episode - Seeing Is Believing
1987	Starman	Julie Radin	1 episode - Appearances
1987	Munchies	Cindy	
1988	Aviel	Emma	
1988	Shattered Innocence	Nora	TV movie (credited as Nadine Van Der Velde)
1988	Shadow Dancing	Jessica Lilliane	
1989	The New Alfred Hitchcock Presents	Rebecca Whitmore	1 episode - In the Driver's Seat
1989	After Midnight	Joan	in The Old Dark Horse
1991	Tropical Heat	Julie	other title - Sweating Bullets, 1 episode - Forget Me Not
1994	Kung Fu: The Legend Continues	Maria Gilberto	1 episode - Sing Wah
1999	JAG	Agent King	1 episode - Webb of Lies
2000	East of A	Reggie Tweed	

Producer
Year	Title	Notes
2002	Rolie Polie Olie: The Great Defender of Fun	(video), (consulting producer)
2003	Miss Spider's Sunny Patch Kids	TV movie
2006–2008	Miss Spider's Sunny Patch Friends	(executive producer), (4 episodes)
2008	A Very Merry Daughter Of the Bride	TV movie, (associate producer)
2009–2013	The Fresh Beat Band	(executive producer), (music producer) (40 episodes)
2015–2016	Little Charmers	executive producer, 30 episodes

Writer
Year	Title	Notes
1990	Once in a Blue Moon	(TV short)
1995	Nancy Drew	2 episodes - Asylum, Bridal Arrangements
1997	Breaker High	
1997–1998	Donkey Kong Country	10 episodes
1998	Rolie Polie Olie	
2000	East of A	
2002	Rolie Polie Olie: The Great Defender of Fun	(video), (credited as Nadine van der Velde)
2003	Miss Spider's Sunny Patch Kids	TV movie
2003	Rolie Polie Olie: The Baby Bot Chase	(video), (credited as Nadine van der Velde)
2004–2007	Miss Spider's Sunny Patch Friends	11 episodes
