= Jonna Lee =

Jonna Lee may refer to:

- Jonna Lee (actress) (born 1963), American television and film actress
- Jonna Lee (singer) (born 1981), Swedish singer-songwriter
