= The Fresh Beat Band =

American children's television series

- Also known as: The JumpArounds
- Genre: Children's; Musical; Sitcom
- Created by: Scott Kraft; Nadine van der Velde
- Developed by: Scott Kraft; Nadine van der Velde; Alice Prodanou
- Written by: Tom Mason (2009–2010); Dan Danko (2009–2010); Alice Prodanou (2009–2013); Carla Banks Waddles (2010–2013); Kim Duran (2010–2013); Scott Kraft (2009–2013); Heather MacGillvray (2010–2013); Linda Mathious (2010–2013); Nadine van der Velde (2009–2013)
- Directed by: Linda Mendoza (2009–2010, 2011); Neal Israel (2009–2013); Jonathan Judge (2009–2011); Henry Chan (2009–2011); James Wahlberg (2011–2012); Jody Margolin Hahn (2011); Scott Kraft (2011–2012); Savage Steve Holland (2011–2013)
- Starring: Jon Beavers; Yvette González-Nacer; Thomas Hobson; Shayna Rose (2009–2011); Tara Perry (2011–2013)
- Theme music composer: Matter Music (Note: A team of music composers consisting of Ric Markmann, Dan Pinnella and Christopher Wagner)
- Opening theme: "The Fresh Beat Band!"
- Ending theme: "The Fresh Beat Band!" (instrumental)
- Composer: Matter Music
- Country of origin: United States
- Original language: English
- No. of seasons: 3
- No. of episodes: 60 + 1 stand-alone special (list of episodes)

Production
- Executive producers: Nadine van der Velde; Scott Kraft
- Producers: Susan R. Nessanbaum-Goldberg (2010–2013); Jim Kukucka (2010–2011); Chris Robinson (2011–2013)
- Production locations: Paramount Studios, Hollywood
- Cinematography: Carlos González; Brandon Mastrippolito; Michael Franks; Tim Gonuos
- Editors: Mitchell Sinoway; Cindy Parisotto
- Camera setup: Multi-camera
- Running time: 23 minutes
- Production company: Nickelodeon Productions

Original release
- Network: Nickelodeon Nick Jr. Channel
- Release: August 24, 2009 – December 7, 2013

Related
- Fresh Beat Band of Spies (2015–2016)

The Fresh Beat Band (originally known as The JumpArounds) is an American musical children's sitcom created by Scott Kraft and Nadine van der Velde for Nickelodeon. The series stars Yvette González-Nacer, Thomas Hobson, Shayna Rose (later Tara Perry), and Jon Beavers as the "Fresh Beats" (Kiki, Shout, Marina, and Twist), described as four best friends in a band who are determined to follow their dreams. It aired from August 24, 2009, to December 7, 2013. After the series ended, reruns of the show aired on the Nick Jr. Channel until July 2, 2016.

In 2015, an animated television series, Fresh Beat Band of Spies, premiered on both Nickelodeon and the Nick Jr. Channel. All four members of the band lend their voices to their respective characters in the spin-off.

== Premise ==
All episodes follow the same basic structure:

- Each episode begins with a song that foreshadows a problem that the band will solve.
- The band works together to solve the problem.
- When the problem is solved they perform a song with the problem and solution incorporated into the lyrics.
- Each episode concludes with a version of The Fresh Beat Band's closing song, "Great Day".
- The main characters dance to choreography by Blush, Mandy Moore; Sean Cheesman; Jesus "Chuck" Maldonado; Scotty Nguyen; Dreya Weber; Beth Bogush; Mary Ann Kellogg; Nakul Mahajan; Mihran Kirakosian; Susan Austin; and Fred Tallaksen.

Also, they appeared in the Nickelodeon Mega Music Fest.

== Episodes ==
Season	Episodes	Originally released	
Season	Episodes	First released	Last released
1	20	August 24, 2009	May 28, 2010
2	20	August 30, 2010	July 24, 2011
3	20	June 24, 2011	December 7, 2013
Special		April 21, 2013	

During the buildup to the show's debut, the band was initially advertised as The JumpArounds. Commercials promoting the band under that name were in heavy rotation on Nickelodeon prior to the series debut. The change occurred approximately in mid July 2009. The name was revealed on the Nick Jr. website, then made its debut on television.

== Characters ==
=== Main ===
The show's main characters are:

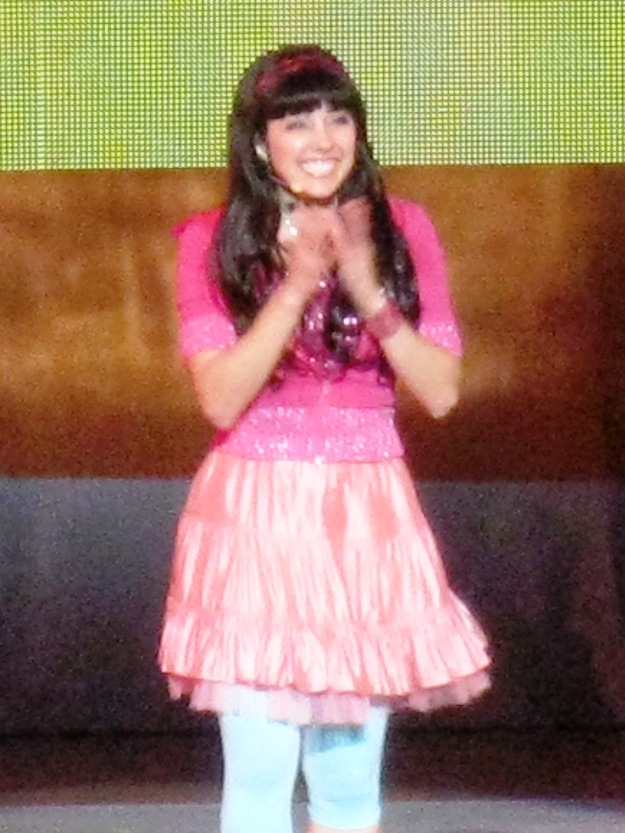

Kiki (Yvette González-Nacer) – guitar, violin, choreographer, vocals

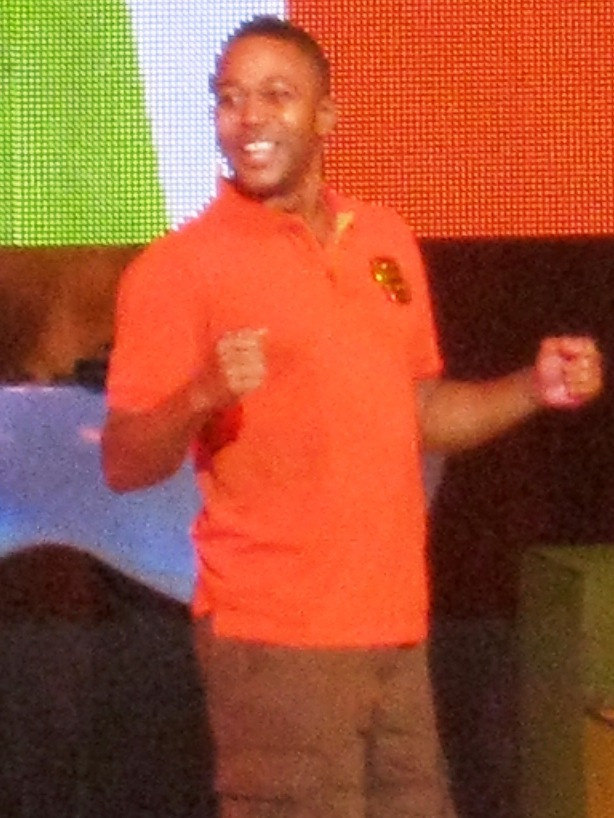

Shout (Thomas Hobson) – keyboards, vocals

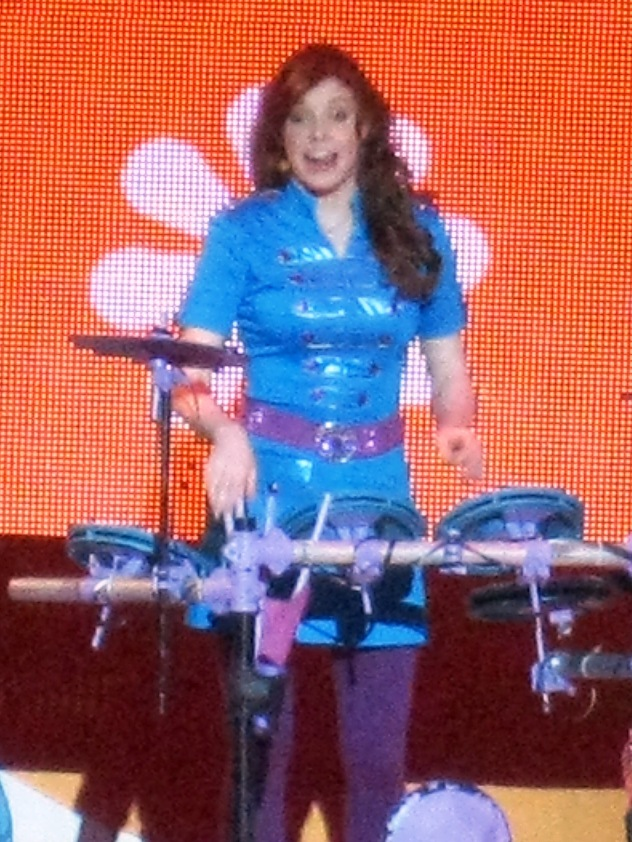

Marina (Tara Perry - who replaced Shayna Rose) – drums, vocals

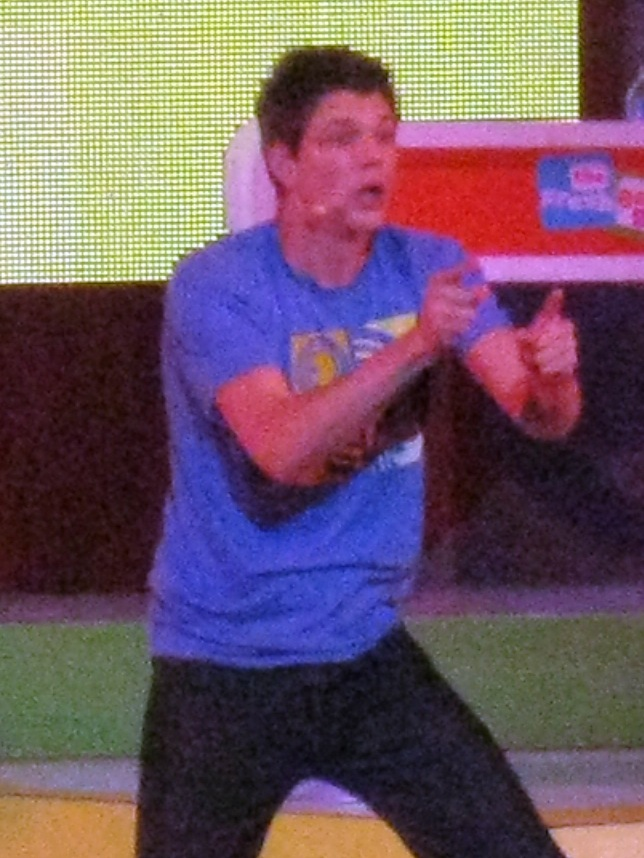

Twist (Jon Beavers) – turntables, beatbox, DJ, vocals

== Music ==
The Fresh Beat Band: Music From the Hit TV Show was released on January 31, 2012. The album sold 189,000 copies in the US in 2012.

The album debuted and peaked at #21 on the Billboard 200 charts on the week of February 18, 2012.

A second collection, Vol 2.0: More Music From The Hit TV Show, was released later that year on October 9, 2012. The soundtracks contain songs from multiple episodes of the series, as well as songs that did not get performed in the episodes. Most of these songs, including the opening and closing themes, were written by the series' creators and executive producers Scott Kraft and Nadine van der Velde, as well as the trio of Ric Markmann, Dan Pinnella, and Christopher Wagner (collectively known as Matter Music). Other composers and producers included Matthew Gerrard, Elizabeth Ashley Saunig-Gerrard, Chip Whitewood, Peter Zizzo, Adam Schlesinger, Shelley Rosenberg, Michael Smith, Matthew Tishler, and Phil Galdston.

=== Singles ===
Four singles were released to iTunes; "Great Day" was released on February 2, 2010, "Here We Go" was released on June 28, 2011, "A Friend Like You" was released on September 13, 2011, and "Just Like a Rockstar" was released on November 29, 2011.

Music from the Hit TV Show
- The Fresh Beats' album cover

Studio album by The Fresh Beat Band
- Released: January 31, 2012
- Recorded: 2009–2011
- Genres: Children's music; Pop rock
- Length: 40:13
- Language: English
- Labels: Viacom International Inc., Legacy Recordings, KRU Music, Varèse Sarabande

The Fresh Beat Band chronology
The JumpArounds (2009)	''Music from the Hit TV Show'' (January 31, 2012)	Let's Get Loud - EP (2012)

Singles from The Fresh Beat Band
- 1. "Great Day" Released: February 2, 2010; 2. "Here We Go" Released: June 28, 2011; 3. "A Friend Like You" Released: September 13, 2011; 4. "Just Like a Rockstar" Released: November 29, 2011

=== Track listing ===
No.	Title	Length
1.	"Fresh Beat Band Theme Song"	0:49
2.	"Here We Go"	1:53
3.	"A Friend Like You"	2:19
4.	"Just Like a Rockstar"	2:02
5.	"Reach for the Sky"	1:55
6.	"I Can Do Anything"	2:01
7.	"Bananas"	1:47
8.	"Music (Keeps Me Movin')"	2:09
9.	"Good Times"	2:00
10.	"Loco Legs"	2:37
11.	"Get Up and Go Go"	2:08
12.	"Another Perfect Day"	2:12
13.	"Shine"	2:19
14.	"Stomp the House"	2:15
15.	"Surprise Yourself"	2:10
16.	"We're Unstoppable"	2:06
17.	"Friends Give Friends a Hand"	1:20
18.	"Freeze Dance"	1:53
19.	"Great Day"	2:08
20.	"Sun Beautiful Sun" (Bonus track by the Bubble Guppies)	2:10

== Home media ==
=== Retail releases ===
Name	Release date	Number of episodes	Episode titles
The Wizard of Song	August 14, 2012	3	"The Wizard of Song"; "Ghost Band"; "Chimps in Charge"

=== Manufacture on-demand releases ===
Name	Release date	Number of episodes	Episode titles
Season 1	March 6, 2012	5 (Disc 1); 5 (Disc 2); 5 (Disc 3); 5 (Disc 4)	Disc 1: "Loco Legs"; "Stick Together"; "Stomp the House"; "Let's Boogie"; "Hippity Hop"; Disc 2: "Quack Shoes"; "Bounce in the House"; "Band Together"; "Freeze Dance"; "Sing with Me"; Disc 3: "Rock to Sleep"; "Glow for It!"; "Hip Hop Hoedown"; "Smoothies to Go-Go"; "March Our Way"; Disc 4: "Rhyme Time"; "Doggone It!"; "Rock the Luau"; "Hocus Pocus"; "Bubble Blast"
Season 2	March 6, 2012	5 (Disc 1); 5 (Disc 2); 5 (Disc 3); 4 (Disc 4)	Disc 1: "Jungle Jazz"; "Balloon Buddy"; "Honk Honk"; "Camping with the Stars"; "Circus Mojo"; Disc 2: "Singin' in the Rain"; "Presto Pants"; "Giant Pumpkin"; "Back to School"; "The Case of the Missing Violin"; Disc 3: "Fresh Beats in Toyland"; "Zydeco Music Parade"; "Car Wash Dance"; "Follow the Leader"; "Kiki's Kickin' Chorus"; Disc 4: "Drum Party"; "Mixed Up Musical"; "Band in a Jam"; "Step It Up"
Season 3	April 10, 2014	5 (Disc 1); 5 (Disc 2); 5 (Disc 3); 4 (Disc 4)	Disc 1: "Graduation Day"; "Giant Pizza"; "Dance Floor Superhero"; "Cool Pool Party"; "Snow Day"; Disc 2: "Rock Star"; "The Fresh Bots"; "Chimps in Charge"; "Pink Swan"; "Hoop Dreams"; Disc 3: "Bollywood Beats"; "Yo! Fresh Beats Go Gabba Gabba!"; "Ghost Band"; "Veloci-Rap-Star"; "Laughing Dance Master"; Disc 4: "Royal Wedding"; "Keeping It Green"; "Dance-A-Thon"; "The Wizard of Song"

=== Episodes on Nick Jr. compilation DVDs ===
Name	Release date	Number of episodes	Episode titles
Nickelodeon: Rootin' Tootin' Wild West	January 29, 2013 (Walmart); August 6, 2013 (retail)	1	"Hip Hop Hoedown"
Nickelodeon: Once Upon a Rhyme	April 30, 2013	1	"Royal Wedding"
Nickelodeon: Celebrate Fall!	August 18, 2015	1	"Giant Pumpkin"

=== Episodes on Nick Jr. iTunes compilations ===
Name	Release date	Number of episodes	Episode titles
To School We Go!	August 16, 2010	1	"March Our Way"
Haunted Halloween Vol. 3	October 25, 2010	1	"Glow for It!"
Bundle of Love Vol. 2	January 31, 2011	1	"Freeze Dance"
Move to the Music	June 6, 2011	1	"Band Together"
Let's Learn Music	November 12, 2012	1	"Rock Star"
Let's Learn Science	November 12, 2012	1	"Keeping It Green"
Let's Learn Weather	November 12, 2012	1	"Singin' in the Rain"
Circus	March 4, 2013	1	"Circus Mojo"
Let's Drive!	April 15, 2013	1	"Car Wash Dance"
Royal Playdates Vol. 1	July 8, 2013	1	"Royal Wedding"
Let's Go to the Rainforest!	July 29, 2013	1	"Jungle Jazz"
Back to School	August 13, 2013	1	"Back to School"
Happy Halloween	October 23, 2013	1	"Ghost Band"
Treasure Hunt Vol. 2	March 31, 2014	1	"The Case of the Missing Violin"
Bedtime Stories	September 29, 2014	1	"Rock to Sleep"

== Reception ==
=== Reviews ===
Drew Magary of Deadspin describes the show as "pure evil, as much as an innocent and friendly show about good friends can be pure evil."

Emily Ashby of Common Sense Media states that "The Fresh Beat Band treats preschoolers to a music-filled good time while promoting kid-friendly messages about friendship, imagination, self-expression, and cooperation."

=== Nominations and awards ===
- 26th Annual Imagen Awards Nomination for Best Young Actress/Television: Yvette Gonzalez-Nacer in The Fresh Beat Band
- Parents Choice 2011 Award: The Fresh Beat Band – Fun Stuff (Ages: 2 – 5 years)
