= Ana Auther =

American actress

- Occupation: Television actress
- Years active: 1984–present

Ana Auther is an American actress. She played Dr. Luisa Estrada in NBC's soap opera Sunset Beach.

Auther graduated from Coronado High School in Scottsdale, Arizona, and from the University of Arizona. In 1979 she was Miss Arizona.

Auther was co-host of Jackpot Bingo, which debuted on June 9, 1986, on KTVK-TV in Phoenix, Arizona. The program ended on January 2, 1987.

== Filmography ==
=== Film ===
Year	Title	Role	Notes
1984	Flashpoint	Roger's Date	
1989	Curse II: The Bite	Maria	
1997	Family Plan	Kathleen Stacey	
2008	Jake's Corner	Corinne	
2012	Goats	Lilly	

=== Television ===
Year	Title	Role	Notes
1988	Shattered Innocence	Chrissie	Television film
1990	Tribes	Dinah	30 episodes
1990, 1991	The Young Riders	Maria / Jennifer	2 episodes
1995	Silk Stalkings	Susan Fuller	Episode: "Community Service"
1995	Legend	Henrietta	2 episodes
1996	Wings	Alicia	Episode: "...Like a Neighbor Scorned"
1996–2000	Days of Our Lives	Various roles	13 episodes
1997	The Naked Truth	Renata	Episode: "Bridesface Revisited"
1998–1999	Sunset Beach	Dr. Luisa Estrada	40 episodes
2009	Maneater	Heather Ellenbach	Episode: "Part 2"
2020	Corporate	Camilla	Episode: "Pickles 4 Breakfast"
