= Shattered Innocence =

- Written by: Thanet Richard; Sandor Stern
- Directed by: Sandor Stern
- Starring: Jonna Lee; Melinda Dillon; John Pleshette; Kris Kamm; Ben Frank; Dennis Howard; Stephen Schnetzer; Richard Cox; Nadine van der Velde
- Composer: Richard Bellis
- Country of origin: United States
- Original language: English

Production
- Producer: Milton Sperling
- Cinematography: Michael D. Margulies
- Editor: Robert F. Shugrue
- Running time: 93 minutes
- Production companies: Green-Epstein Productions; Lorimar Television

Original release
- Network: CBS
- Release: March 9, 1988

Shattered Innocence is a 1988 American made for television drama film directed by Sandor Stern and written by Thanet Richard and Sandor Stern. The film stars Jonna Lee, Melinda Dillon, John Pleshette, Kris Kamm, Ben Frank, Dennis Howard, Stephen Schnetzer, Richard Cox and Nadine van der Velde. The film premiered on CBS on March 9, 1988.

== Plot ==
An eighteen year old former Kansas high school cheerleader moves to Los Angeles upon graduating and becomes a cocaine addicted porn actress before committing suicide at age twenty. Based on the dramatization of real-life accounts of the late Shauna Grant.

== Cast ==
- Jonna Lee as Pauleen Anderson
- Melinda Dillon as Sharon Anderson
- John Pleshette as Mel Erman
- Kris Kamm as Cory Parker
- Ben Frank as Lou Gates
- Dennis Howard as Del Anderson
- Stephen Schnetzer as Danny Calloway
- Richard Cox as Brad Pullman
- Nadine van der Velde as Nora
- Randy Hamilton as Vince
- Peppi Sanders as Vicki
- Melissa Michaelsen as Patricia
- Neil Billingsley as Don
- Ana Auther as Chrissie
- Mark Gluckman as Roy
- Traci Davis as Mary Lou
- Bob Sorenson as Dave
- Kenneth Bridges as Detective
- Jody Carter as Mary
- Crissy Cummings as Annette
- Richard Glover as Phil
- Lucky Hayes as Susan
- Linda Rae Jurgens as Woman Presenter
- Sheila Lane-Limon as Carolyn
- Sheila Paige Roth as Maureen
- Carrie Schultz as Lisa
- Stephen Yoakam as Jerry
