= Shauna Grant =

American pornographic actress and nude model (1963–1984)

- Born: Colleen Marie Applegate; May 30, 1963; Bellflower, California, U.S.
- Died: March 23, 1984 (aged 20); Palm Springs, California, U.S.
- Cause of death: Suicide by gunshot
- Other names: Callie Aims; Callie Aimes
- Occupations: Pornographic actress; model
- Years active: 1982–1984

Colleen Marie Applegate (May 30, 1963 – March 23, 1984), known professionally as Shauna Grant, was an American pornographic actress and nude model. During her two-year career, she appeared in over 30 pornographic films, earning up to $100,000. Grant fatally shot herself after the arrest of her cocaine-dealing partner in March 1984. She was inducted into the XRCO Hall of Fame in 1999.

== Early life ==
Colleen Marie Applegate was born in Bellflower, California. In 1963, her family moved to Farmington, Minnesota, when her father, Philip Applegate, took a managerial position with the Central Telephone Company of Minnesota. Colleen was a cheerleader at her school, Farmington High School. After graduating in 1981, she worked locally as a cashier and then as a repair clerk with the phone company.

Applegate attempted suicide in December 1981 by overdosing on prescription sinus pills. Her father later said he never discussed the attempt with his daughter; he and his wife at the time (Colleen's mother, Karen Lee Applegate) believed she was merely seeking attention. The family had at least one group session at a counseling center during which no one really talked about the situation. After news spread around Farmington about her suicide attempt, Applegate left town with her boyfriend, Mike Marcell, moving to California in March 1982.

== Adult film career ==
After arriving in Los Angeles, Applegate and Marcell unsuccessfully pursued several employment leads. Marcell then saw an ad for the World Modeling Agency in Van Nuys, which sought recruits for "figure modeling". Applegate and Marcell visited the agency's owner, Jim South, who set up a session with soft-core photographer J. Stephen Hicks, whose work often appeared in Penthouse.

Her first pictorial's theme featured a mock camping set and was published by Club. Hicks said of Applegate: "I deal with a lot of girls who are new in the business, a lot of young girls and a lot of girls from out of town. Colleen was so incredibly young and naive. She was completely un-hip and non-L.A."

Her wholesome, "girl next door" looks soon landed her work posing for other magazines such as Chic, Hustler, Swank, and Penthouse. But Hicks advised Applegate to get out of nude modeling quickly, because when all of the magazines had used her, the only thing left for her would be hardcore movies. "You know, you take a typical girl that's used to working at McDonald's or at a shoe store, where she's used to making a minimum wage, and suddenly she's given the opportunity to get made up, and be in front of people who tell her she's beautiful, and make as much money in a day as she was making in three weeks and they change. They change. And that's sad."

Almost immediately, Applegate progressed to filming hardcore sessions for photographer Suze Randall.

Applegate's relationship with Marcell ended within their first two months in California; he returned to Farmington and joined the U.S. Army. Before his induction, he informed some Farmington residents that Applegate was making pornography, which embarrassed her family. In a 1987 Frontline documentary, Marcell refused to speak about his relationship with Applegate except to say that he no longer cared about her.

Ignoring Hicks's advice, Applegate continued working with World Modeling Agency, where she met veteran porn producer Bobby Hollander. Hollander launched her adult film career, suggesting what he felt was a "classy" stage name, Shauna Grant.

She appeared in Virginia, Suzie Superstar, and Flesh and Laces 1 & 2, among other films. Her pay rose from $300 a day to around $1,500. As Shauna Grant, she made dozens of adult movies. In Suzie Superstar, she played the lead singer of a rock band.

Grant was provided with her own makeup artist, Laurie Smith. Smith, who co-starred with Grant in several movies (including Suzie Superstar, The Young Like It Hot, and Bad Girls IV), became Grant's best friend and fellow cocaine user during that period. She quit the adult film business for a short time after Grant's suicide.

Grant's popularity earned her three acting nominations at the Erotic Film Awards in 1984. But she had some difficulty getting work due to her cocaine addiction and lack of "enthusiasm" during sex scenes. In some circles she acquired the nickname "Applecoke" and a reputation for flakiness.

== Retirement ==
In 1983, Grant met Jake Ehrlich, a cocaine dealer who had wanted to meet her after seeing photos of her. She met him at his home in Palm Springs and never left. Embracing an image of a domesticated life, Grant retired from the adult film industry. Her career lasted less than a year and included over 30 films and videos. During that time, she had sex on screen with 37 men, contracted herpes, and had an abortion.

On March 14, 1984, despite not making any films for the previous 10 months, she was a multiple nominee and presenter (with John Leslie) at the 8th Annual Adult Film Association Awards show at the Coconut Grove Ambassador Hotel. While her desire to act in mainstream films had generated no offers, she was so prestigious at the time that director Francis Ford Coppola was seated at her table.

At the awards show, Grant accepted a role in the upcoming adult film Matinee Idol. The film was due to begin filming in eight days in San Francisco, California. A few days after the awards show, a boyfriend she met during a trip to Minnesota flew to Los Angeles to visit her. But in the days following the awards show, Grant and Smith had partied and then slept for two days, losing track of time. When her boyfriend arrived, Grant had no way to pick him up at the airport and spent the day trying to find transportation. Then Ehrlich telephoned from prison and told her that their relationship was over and that she had to move out of his home.

Grant persuaded her friend, porn performer Kelly Nichols, to take over the role Grant had accepted in Matinee Idol. Her parents offered to pay for her college expenses if she returned to Minnesota, but she believed she would no longer be comfortable there.

== Death ==
On March 20, 1984, Grant called her friend Brenda and asked her to keep her company while she packed to leave Ehrlich's home.

On March 21, Grant shot herself with a .22 caliber rifle. Brenda found Grant's body wedged between two mattresses that had been made into a single bed. Grant was taken to a Palm Springs hospital, where she was taken off life support and declared dead two days later.

Grant's funeral was held on March 28, 1984, at St. Michael's Church, a Catholic parish in Farmington. She is buried in the church's cemetery.

== In popular culture ==
=== Film ===
- Adult filmmaker Roberta Findlay made the controversial Shauna: Every Man's Fantasy (1985) about Grant's suicide.
- The television movie Shattered Innocence (1988), starring Jonna Lee, is loosely based on Grant's life. Her parents used the proceeds from selling the movie rights to pay for their daughter's tombstone.

=== Television ===
- Frontline: "Death of a Porn Queen" (June 8, 1987), as herself (archive footage; originally produced as a local special report for WCCO-TV in Minneapolis-St. Paul)
- Hard Copy: "Shauna Grant" (June 18, 1990), as herself (archive footage)

=== Music ===
- The musician Klaus Flouride honored Grant in the song "Dancing with Shauna Grant", from his album The Light Is Flickering (1991). The song also mentions Virginia and Suzie Superstar, both of which are films that Grant starred in.
- Pop-punk band J Church wrote a song about Grant's life and suicide, "Girl in a Magazine", which appears on their 7" This Song Is For Kathi (1992).
- Christian metal band Mastedon wrote a song, "Innocent Girl", in memory of Grant, which is on its debut album, It's a Jungle Out There! (1989). The lyrics are by the former Kansas lead John Elefante and his brother Dino.
- American death metal band Ripping Corpse wrote a song for its album Dreaming with the Dead (1991) about Grant, "Deeper Demons". The lyrics question why such a tragic fate befell "little Colleen".
