= Stephen Schnetzer =

American actor (born 1948)

- Born: Stephen Paul Schnetzer; June 11, 1948 (age 78); Canton, Massachusetts
- Other names: Steven Schnetzer; Stephen St. Paul; Steven St. Paul
- Education: Juilliard School (BFA)
- Occupation: Actor
- Years active: 1976–present
- Spouses: Amy Ingersoll (1976–19??; divorced); Nancy Snyder (1982–??; divorced)
- Children: 2, including Ben Schnetzer

Stephen Paul Schnetzer (born June 11, 1948) is an American actor. He is best known for playing the role of Cass Winthrop on Another World from 1982 to 1986, returning in 1987 until the show's cancellation in 1999. He won a Soap Opera Digest Award for Outstanding Comic Actor in 1989 for his role on Another World and received a Daytime Emmy Award nomination in 1990 for Outstanding Lead Actor.

== Early life ==
Schnetzer was born in Canton, Massachusetts on June 11, 1948. His father was a postal worker and his mother was secretary to the superintendent of schools in Canton. His father had German and Irish ancestry. His mother was a war bride from Algeria.

Schnetzer attended Catholic Memorial School and The University of Massachusetts, earning a degree in French, with a minor in Spanish. He studied acting at Juilliard and The American Conservatory Theater in San Francisco. While at Juilliard, he took circus classes and learned to juggle. Schnetzer trained with William Esper, using the Meisner technique.

== Career ==
Early in his career, he was sometimes billed under the names Steven Schnetzer, Stephen St. Paul, and Steven St. Paul. He made his film debut with a small role in Hail (credited as Steven Schnetzer). In 1976, he played Lucentio in a TV movie production of The Taming of the Shrew and guest-starred on Hawaii Five-O (credited for both roles as Stephen St. Paul).

Schnetzer played the role of Julie Olson Williams' brother, Steven Olson, on the NBC soap opera Days of Our Lives from 1978 to 1980. He guest-starred on The Love Boat and Fantasy Island.

In 1980, he made his Broadway debut in Filumena, playing the son of Joan Plowright. The play was directed by Laurence Olivier. Schnetzer joined the cast of the ABC soap opera One Life to Live, playing Marcello Salta from 1980 to 1982. Schnetzer returned to Broadway in 1981, playing Mark Harrison in A Talent For Murder at the Biltmore Theater. On television, he appeared in the 1983 TV movie Rage of Angels.

He landed the role of attorney Cass Winthrop on Another World in 1982 and stayed until 1986. He decided to leave to pursue other opportunities in Los Angeles, while also spending time with his newborn son. Schnetzer returned to Another World in 1987, continuing to play Cass until the show's final episodes aired in June 1999. He won a Soap Opera Digest Award in 1989 for Outstanding Comic Actor for his work on the show. He also received Soap Opera Digest Award nominations in 1986, 1991, 1992, and 1999. He was nominated for a Daytime Emmy Award for Outstanding Lead Actor in 1990.

During his time on Another World, Schnetzer appeared in the TV movie Shattered Innocence. He guest-starred on The Cosby Mysteries and Prince Street. After Another World's cancellation, Schnetzer continued to appear as Cass Winthrop on the CBS soap operas As the World Turns (1999 to 2002; 2005 and 2006) and Guiding Light (2002). He made guest appearances on Law & Order and Law & Order: Special Victims Unit. He played Mr. Hammon in the 2005 drama film Brooklyn Lobster.

Schnetzer returned to Broadway in 2002, replacing Bill Pullman in the role of Ross in Edward Albee's The Goat, or Who is Sylvia? He went on to play the role of Martin in a production of The Goat, or Who is Sylvia? at Lyric Stage in Boston, opening in February 2006. He starred as Garry Lejeune in Noises Off at Arena Stage in Washington, D.C. from December 2006 to 2007. He co-starred with his son, Ben Schnetzer, in the 2007 film Ben's Plan.

From 2008 to 2013, he had guest-starring roles on The Wire, Fringe, Damages, The Good Wife, Law & Order: Criminal Intent, and Person of Interest. He appeared on Homeland, playing a character named Dr. Cass Winthrop.

From May to June 2009, Schnetzer played Voltaire in Legacy of Light at Arena Stage in Crystal City, Virginia. He returned to the same venue in September 2009, appearing in The Quality of Life, co-starring with Annette O'Toole and Kevin O'Rourke. In October 2015, he starred in Arthur Miller's Broken Glass at the Westport Country Playhouse in Connecticut.

Schnetzer became a prolific voiceover talent in English and French, advertising for many companies, such as Kellogg's Frosted Flakes. He continued to land guest-starring roles, appearing from 2014 to 2018 on Forever, The Blacklist, Flesh and Bone, Blue Bloods, Billions, and Elementary. Schnetzer appeared in the 2017 film Aardvark. He starred as Richard in the independent film A Case of Blue. Since 2022, Schnetzer has appeared on the web series The Bay.

In 2024, it was announced that he would be returning to Days of Our Lives as Steven Olson.

== Personal life ==
Schnetzer married Amy Ingersoll at the Swedenborgian Church in San Francisco, on November 24, 1976. They later divorced.

He met actress Nancy Snyder while they were both on One Life to Live (she played Katrina Karr). They were married on March 18, 1982 and had two sons. They are now divorced. Their younger son, Ben Schnetzer, is also an actor.

== Filmography ==
=== Film ===
Year	Title	Role	Notes
1972	Hail	The People	Also known as Hail to the Chief, Mr. President, and Washington, B.C; Credited as Steven Schnetzer
2005	Brooklyn Lobster	Mr. Hammon	
2007	Ben's Plan	Carl Stephens	
2011	Keys. Wallet. Phone	Handsome Man	Short film
2017	Aardvark	Don Herremans	
2020	A Case of Blue	Richard	
2022	Laurina	Dr. Porter	Short film
2023	Nyad	Commentator	

=== Television ===
Year	Title	Role	Notes
1976	The Taming of the Shrew	Lucentio	Television film Credited as Steve St. Paul
1976	Hawaii Five-O	Officer Blankenship	Episode: "Target - A Cop"; Credited as Stephen St. Paul
1978	Fantasy Island	Cebee Singh	Episode: "Return/The Toughest Man Alive"
1978–1979; 2024-2025	Days of Our Lives	Steven Olson	Series regular (1978–1979); guest (2024-2025)
1979	The Love Boat	Francois	Episode: "April's Return/Super Mom/I'll See You Again"
1980–1982	One Life to Live	Marcello Salta	Contract role
1982–1999	Another World	Cass Winthrop / Rex Allingham	Contract role 1,123 episodes
1983	Rage of Angels	Lawyer	Miniseries
1984	Match Game-Hollywood Squares Hour	Himself	Panelist; 10 episodes
1988	Shattered Innocence	Danny Calloway	Television film
1994	The Cosby Mysteries	Marty Brackett / Howard Brackett	Episode: "Mirror, Mirror"
1997	Prince Street		Episode: "God Bless America"
1999–2006	As the World Turns	Cass Winthrop	Recurring role 28 episodes
2002	Guiding Light	Cass Winthrop	Recurring role
2003; 2006	Law & Order	Mitchell Lowell / Dr. Freeman	2 episodes
2003; 2004; 2008	Law & Order: Special Victims Unit	Dr. Engles / Rabbi Birnbaum	4 episodes
2008	New Amsterdam	Toby Hardwick's Lawyer	Episode: "Pilot"
2008	The Wire	Robert Ruby	2 episodes
2008	Law & Order: Criminal Intent	Ajay Khan	Episode: "Assassin"
2009	Fringe	Professor Miles Kinberg	Episode: "Bound"
2009	Damages	ADA Carl Deevers	Episode: "Hey! Mr. Pibb!"
2010	Rubicon	Arnold Hopper	2 episodes
2010	The Good Wife	Glenn Childs' Lead Attorney	Uncredited; Episode: "Infamy"
2013	Person of Interest	Tug Brantley	Episode: "Booked Solid"
2013	Homeland	Dr. Cass Winthrop	2 episodes
2014	Forever	Lawrence Forester	Episode: "New York Kids"
2015	The Blacklist	Lester Charles Conway	Episode: "Vanessa Cruz (No. 117)"
2015	The Following	Malcolm Tower	Episode: "Flesh & Blood"
2015	Flesh and Bone	LeRan Brousseau	2 episodes
2016	The Path	Dr. Alan Rothstein	Originally titled The Way; Episode: "Breaking and Entering"
2017	Blue Bloods	Hassan Nejari	Episode: "The One That Got Away"
2017	Billions	Antoine Casson	Episode: "With or Without You"
2018	Elementary	Adam Braun	Episode: "The Geek Interpreter"
2020	The Show Must Go Online	Brabantio / Julius Caesar	2 episodes
2022	The Endgame	Moustakas	Episode: "#1 with a Bullet"
2022–2025	The Bay	Richard Kaufman	20 episodes

=== Video games ===
Year	Title	Role	Notes
2004	Red Dead Revolver	Sheriff O'Grady / Charger / Union Soldier	Voice
2004	Conflict: Vietnam		Voice

== Awards and nominations ==
Year	Award	Category	Title	Result	Ref.
1989	Soap Opera Digest Award	Outstanding Comic Performance by an Actor: Daytime	Another World	Won	
1990	Daytime Emmy Award	Outstanding Lead Actor in a Drama Series	Another World	Nominated	
1992	Soap Opera Digest Award	Outstanding Lead Actor: Daytime	Another World	Nominated	
