= Making the Grade (1984 film) =

1984 American film

- Theatrical release poster
- Directed by: Dorian Walker
- Written by: Charles Gale; Gene Quintano
- Produced by: Gene Quintano
- Starring: Judd Nelson; Jonna Lee; Gordon Jump; Walter Olkewicz; Ronald Lacey; Dana Olsen
- Cinematography: Jacques Haitkin
- Edited by: Daniel Wetherbee
- Music by: Basil Poledouris
- Distributed by: Cannon Film Distributors (United Kingdom and International) MGM/UA Entertainment Co. (United States)
- Release date: May 18, 1984
- Running time: 104 minutes
- Country: United States
- Language: English
- Box office: $4,561,346

Making the Grade is a 1984 American teen comedy film. It was directed by Dorian Walker and written by Charles Gale and Gene Quintano. It was filmed at Rhodes College in Memphis, Tennessee. It marks the debut of actor turned television producer Dan Schneider.

== Plot ==
Palmer Woodrow is a rich prep school kid who rarely attends class and has been expelled from numerous prep schools. His parents are traveling internationally and inform him that he has been enrolled at Hoover Academy and he has one last chance to graduate or he will be cut off financially. Meanwhile, Eddie Keaton is a small-time con artist and high school dropout who has run afoul of a local loanshark named "Dice". Via a chance meeting, Woodrow hires Keaton for $10,000 and a Porsche to attend his prep school and graduate, freeing Woodrow to travel to Europe for skiing.

== Cast ==
- Judd Nelson as Eddie Keaton
- Jonna Lee as Tracey Hoover
- Gordon Jump as Mr. Harriman
- Walter Olkewicz as Coach Wordman
- Ronald Lacey as Nicky
- Dana Olsen as Palmer Woodrow
- John Dye as Skip
- Carey Scott as Rand
- Scott McGinnis as Bif
- Andrew Dice Clay as Dice
- Dan Schneider as Blimp

== Production ==
The film began production under the working title of The Last American Preppie, but Chuck Vincent, who produced and directed the film Preppies, filed a complaint with the MPAA over the use of the words "preppie" and "preppy" The MPAA sided with Vincent and noted Preppies had been registered with the MPAA over a year before Cannon registered the titles The Last American Preppy and The Unofficial Preppy Movie prompting MGM/UA to change the name. The company created a shortlist of 200 alternate titles liking none of them and decided to turn the situation into a contest wherein test screenings for the film now under the title of Name This Movie would be shown in Fort Lauderdale, Florida with audience members able to participate in a contest wherein they would suggest names for the film.

This film marks the first appearance of Andrew Clay's "Dice" persona.

Over 1,000 entries were received in the contest with the winning title, Making the Grade, suggested by then eighteen-year-old University of Central Florida student David Thollander. Ironically, Making the Grade had been on the shortlist of rejected alternate titles prior to the contest.

At the start of the film's final credits, the characters Palmer and Eddie are touted as returning in the upcoming movie, Tourista. However, after low theatrical interest in the duo and repeated missed deadlines (of which Olsen tried to contribute as a writer), the script for Tourista was never completed. The pair never teamed up in filmmaking again.

== Reception ==
In his review for The New York Times, Vincent Canby wrote "The humor, some of it looking and sounding as if it had been lifted from The Official Preppy Handbook, is wan, and the direction, by Dorian Walker, without character of any sort. I left after watching approximately an hour of it.".

Audiences polled by CinemaScore gave the film an average grade of "C" on an A+ to F scale.
