= Yvette González-Nacer =

American actress

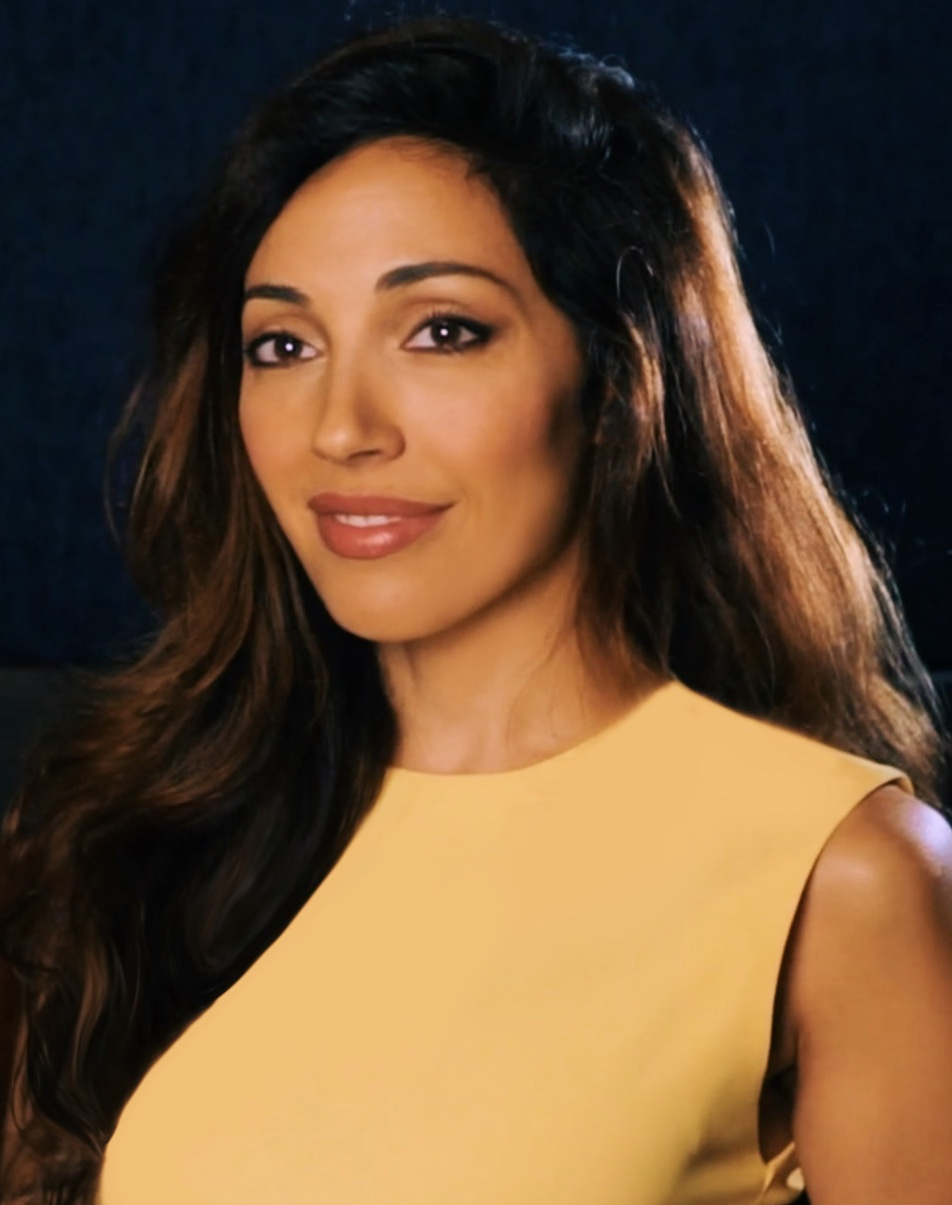
- Yvette González-Nacer in 2022
- Born: October 23; Miami, Florida, U.S.
- Education: University of Miami
- Occupations: Actress, singer
- Years active: 2004-present
- Notable work: The Fresh Beat Band; Hadestown
- Website: www.yvettenacer.com

Yvette González-Nacer (born October 23) is an American actress and singer. She is best known for originating the role of Fate in the original Broadway production of the Grammy and Tony Award-winning musical Hadestown, starring in the first Broadway National Tour of Moulin Rouge!, and starring as Kiki on Nickelodeon's Emmy Award Winning TV series The Fresh Beat Band. During the show's run, Yvette and the cast performed a sold-out tour in front of half a million fans.

== Early life and education ==
González-Nacer was born to Cuban immigrant parents in Miami, Florida. She became interested in music early, taking violin lessons when she was 3 years old and taking voice lessons in high school. She attended the University of Miami after receiving an opera scholarship.

== Career ==
González-Nacer's early career focused on music rather than acting. She spent time as a member of a jazz band and toured alongside Engelbert Humperdinck, singing the duet "How Do You Keep The Music Playing" with him on a World Tour.

=== Theater ===
González-Nacer played the character Maria in Dolores Prida's Off-Broadway show 4 Guys Named Jose ... and Una Mujer Named Maria. Her performance was praised as "comically endearing" by Variety. and as "unfairly charming" by Back Stage West. She performed alongside Luis Valdez in Corridos Remix, and she was awarded a Craig Noel Award for Outstanding Female Lead in a Musical by the San Diego Theatre Critics Circle. She played Vanessa in the first national tour of Lin-Manuel Miranda's musical In the Heights.

González-Nacer made her Broadway debut in 2019, playing one of the three Fates in Anaïs Mitchell's musical Hadestown. She had previously played the role in a 2017 performance at the New York Theatre Workshop. Nacer handled the highest part of the three. Her performance in the musical was complimented in reviews by The Daily Beast, The Hollywood Reporter, and Rolling Stone. In 2022, she joined the cast of Moulin Rouge! for the show's first national tour. Initially an alternate, she took over the role of Satine shortly after the tour began. Her performance was received positively by The Washington Post and Metro Weekly. González-Nacer played Mrs. Wright in Real Women Have Curves, which received a limited run at the American Repertory Theater from 2023 to 2024.

=== Television and film ===
González-Nacer starred in the television series The Fresh Beat Band from 2009 to 2013, later rejoining the case for the animated spin-off series Fresh Beat Band of Spies in 2015. She embarked on a concert tour alongside the cast of The Fresh Beat Band in 2012. She was nominated in the "Best Young Actress/Television" category at the 2011 Imagen Awards for her work in The Fresh Beat Band. She was again nominated for "Best Actress/Television" at the 2014 Imagen Awards. In 2016, González-Nacer played Cha Cha in Grease Live!, a television film adaptation of the 1978 film Grease. She then went on to portray the role of Soledad Penagos on CBS' "Madam Secretary," Ella on ABC's "9-1-1" and Isabella on AMC's "Wicked City." She most recently portrayed the role of Amanda in the feature film "Murder Motel" with Mickey Rourke and starred in the feature film "Playing For Mozart."

=== Music ===
González-Nacer released her first album, "Not Gonna Wait," in 2012. In 2020, she released a Christmas album featuring her Hadestown castmates Jewelle Blackman and Kay Trinidad titled "If The Fates Allow: A Hadestown Holiday Album."

=== Philanthropy ===
González-Nacer is the founder of Creative Minds Care, a nonprofit organization that raises awareness and funds for Alzheimer's research as well as other neurodegenerative diseases. She is also a "Celebrity Champion" for the Alzheimer's Association and an ambassador for Active Minds.

== Filmography ==
=== Film ===
Year	Title	Role	Notes
2018	Life, Itself		Performed and produced "Not Dark Yet"
2019	Cactus Flower	Colby	
2022	The Curse of La Patasola	La Patasola	Composed, produced and performed the Main Theme. Voiced titular character
2023	Murder Motel	Amanda	
2024	Playing For Mozart	Mara	
2025	Hurricanna		Executive Producer

=== Television ===
Year	Title	Role	Notes
2007	The Wedding Bells	Teresa	Episode: "Fools in Love"
2007	Guiding Light	Rosa	3 episodes
2009–2013	The Fresh Beat Band	Kiki	60 episodes
2011	The Tonight Show with Jay Leno	Herself	Episode: "Episode #20.19"
2013	Criminal Minds	Gina Mendes	Episode: "Nanny Dearest"
2015–2016	Fresh Beat Band of Spies	Kiki (voice role)	20 episodes
2016	Grease Live!	Cha Cha	TV Movie
2017	Madam Secretary	Soledad Penagos	Episode: "Labor of Love"
2018	Goldie & Bear	Phyllis	Episode: "Horsin' Around/Pigs Without Twigs"
2023	9-1-1	Ella	Episode: "Love Is In the Air"
2024	Wicked City	Isabella	Season 3

=== Video games ===
Year	Title	Voice Role	Notes
2011	Nickelodeon Dance	Kiki	

=== Theater ===
Year	Production	Role	Theatre	Category
2009–2011	In the Heights	Vanessa	1st Broadway National Tour	
2018	Sweet Charity	Nickie	Reprise 2.0	
2019–2020	Hadestown	Fate	Walter Kerr Theatre	
2022–2023	Moulin Rouge!	Satine	1st Broadway National Tour	
2023–2024	Real Women Have Curves	Mrs. Wright	American Repertory Theater	
2024	Mozart: Her Story (A New Musical)	Constanze Weber	Theatre Royal Drury Lane (West End)	

== Awards and nominations ==
Year	Organisation	Award	Work	Result	Ref.
2005	Craig Noel Awards	Female Lead, Musical	Corridos Remix	Won	
2011	Imagen Awards	Best Young Actress/Television	The Fresh Beat Band	Nominated	
2014	Imagen Awards	Best Actress/Television	The Fresh Beat Band	Nominated	
2016	BTVA Television Voice Acting Award	Best Vocal Ensemble in a New Television Series	Fresh Beat Band of Spies	Nominated	
2018	Bonehead Awards	Best Music Video	Santeria	Won	
