= The Midnight Hour =

1985 American comedy horror film

- Original advertisement
- Genre: Comedy horror
- Written by: Bill Bleich
- Directed by: Jack Bender
- Starring: Shari Belafonte-Harper: Kevin McCarthy (actor); LeVar Burton; Lee Montgomery; Peter DeLuise; Dedee Pfeiffer; Jonna Lee; Dick Van Patten; Kurtwood Smith
- Theme music composer: Brad Fiedel
- Country of origin: United States
- Original language: English

Production
- Executive producer: Sharon L. Sawyer
- Producers: Ervin Zavada; Jill Mullikin-Bates
- Production location: California, USA
- Cinematography: Rexford L. Metz
- Editor: David A. Simmons
- Running time: 94 minutes
- Production company: ABC Circle Films: Capital Cities

Original release
- Network: ABC
- Release: November 1, 1985

The Midnight Hour is a 1985 American made-for-television comedy horror film directed by Jack Bender and starring Shari Belafonte, Lee Montgomery, Kevin McCarthy, LeVar Burton, Peter DeLuise, and Dedee Pfeiffer. Its plot revolves around a small New England town becoming overrun with zombies, witches, vampires, and other demons of hell after a group of teenagers unlocks a centuries-old curse on Halloween.

The film aired on ABC on Friday, November 1, 1985, at 9:00–11:00 pm EST. In addition to an original musical number, "Get Dead", the film's soundtrack features songs by Wilson Pickett, Creedence Clearwater Revival, Sam the Sham and the Pharaohs, Three Dog Night, and The Smiths.

== Plot ==
It is Halloween in the small town of Pitchford Cove, Massachusetts, and five high school friends, Phil, Mary, Mitch, Vinnie, and Melissa, plan on making it a night they will never forget. They steal outfits from the town's witchcraft museum and come upon other old artifacts, including a trunk holding a paper scroll which contains an ancient curse. When the latent sorceress Melissa recites the curse at the local cemetery, things take a turn for the worse.

The town's dead, led by Melissa's great-great-great-great-grandmother Lucinda Cavender, a witch who was put to death 300 years earlier, rise up from their graves and roam the town. While Melissa, Mitch, Vinnie, and Mary enjoy themselves at their annual Halloween costume party, Phil encounters a mysterious girl, named Sandra "Sandy" Matthews, dressed in a 1950s cheerleader outfit, who warns him that the whole town is in danger.

Lucinda and the various undead crash the costume party. At first, nobody understands what's happening – since everyone is in costume –, until Lucinda begins turning the party guests into vampires, starting with Melissa (her bloodline).

When Sandy discovers that Phil and his friends recited the ancient spell in the cemetery, she decides to team up with him in order to break the curse. The only way to set things right is to retrieve the Grenville Spirit Ring as well as the remains of Lucinda's archenemy, witch-hunter Nathaniel Grenville, who was, incidentally, Phil's great-great-great-great-grandfather. Phil and Sandy must restore the town to normal by midnight or the curse becomes permanent.

The local police do not take Phil and Sandy's warning seriously, so Phil obtains his family hunting rifle and melts down his father's coin collection to make silver bullets, an effective tool to fight the undead for the time being. They return to the Halloween party, discovering that everyone has been turned into undead creatures. Phil manages to get the Grenville Spirit Ring from a zombified Mitch, subsequently driving himself and Sandy to the cemetery. They break into Grenville's crypt and exhume his remains, just as Lucinda and the horde of undead launch an attack. Cornered in the car, Phil seals the scroll's seam with the bone dust infused candle wax, validating the ritual with the ring's signet.

With the crisis averted, Sandy tells Phil she loves him, and she, along with every creature resurrected on that night, vanishes. The wounds that Phil sustained disappear and the damage to his car is undone—as if the entire event had never happened.

Phil identifies Sandy's grave and understands that she had been one of the undead too. As the clock strikes midnight, Phil begins to drive back to town, and he listens to a song dedication on the radio from someone identifying themself as "Sandy", implying that she will always be looking after him even from beyond the grave.

== Cast ==
- Lee Montgomery as Phil Grenville
- Shari Belafonte as Melissa Cavender
- Peter DeLuise as Mitch Crandall
- LeVar Burton as Vinnie Davis
- Dedee Pfeiffer as Mary Masterson
- Jonna Lee as Sandy Matthews
- Jonelle Allen as Lucinda Cavender
- Cindy Morgan as Vicky Jensen
- Kurtwood Smith as Captain Warren Jensen
- Dick Van Patten as Martin Grenville
- Sheila Larken as Janet Grenville
- Wolfman Jack as the radio DJ
- Kevin McCarthy as Judge Crandall
- Mark Blankfield as The Ghoul
- Macaulay Culkin as a Halloween kid

== Release ==
The Midnight Hour had its world premiere on ABC on Friday, November 1, 1985, at 9:00–11:00 pm EST. The film later aired on occasion during the Halloween season, with an 8 pm airing on the Lifetime network on Wednesday, October 31, 1990. Lifetime continued to air the film on numerous occasions during afternoon time slots, including showings on December 27, 1990, June 19, 1992, and October 31, 1992.

=== Home media ===
Vidmark released The Midnight Hour on VHS in May 1989. Anchor Bay Entertainment re-released it on VHS on July 20, 1999 with a Region 1 DVD following on September 19, 2000. Both releases of the film are out of print.

== Critical response ==
=== Contemporaneous ===
Rick Sherwood of the San Bernardino Sun deemed the film a "less-than-satisfying teenage monster movie," adding: "The two-hour made-for-TV movie is billed as a humorous horror romp, but The Midnight Hour is really a campy monster bash in which revived corpses break into song and dance. Expect neither tricks nor treats, just lots of rock music, fake-looking special effects, and slow-moving scenes." A review published in The Des Moines Register noted: "The plot is contrived and simple, but the special effects, makeup, and costumes (done by the same person who staged Michael Jackson's "Thriller" video) may be worth the watch," while a review in The Tennessean described the film as "a sophomoric concoction about a bunch of teenagers who conjure up a gang of goblins." Leonard Maltin wrote in his 1987 film guide that The Midnight Hour was "below average...[a] bland concoction of teen comedies, music videos, horror spoofs, and monster mashes."

=== Retrospective ===
Of retrospective assessments on the film, Gary Militzer of DVD Verdict called it "a mediocre made-for-TV horror/comedy" unworthy of a DVD release, while the 2004 DVD and Video Guide deemed it an "enjoyable cross between Night of the Living Dead and An American Werewolf in London, helped along by humor and a lively cast." AllMovie's Robert Firsching wrote: "Cultists and completists may find it worth a look for camp value alone, but most will want to give it a wide berth."

In Zombie Movies: The Ultimate Guide (2012), Glenn Kay called the film "lavishly produced, but not particularly thrilling," adding that it "has a sickening cuteness to it." Vampire fiction scholar John L. Flynn referred to the film as "a hodgepodge of horror film cliches." John Stanley wrote in Creature Features (2000) that the film was a "violent TV-movie vacillating between graveyard humor and shock thrills." Academic Peter Dendle noted in The Zombie Movie Encyclopedia: "Even zombie movie completists will have a hard time stomaching this lame made-for-TV drivel," likening elements of the film to Children Shouldn't Play with Dead Things (1972) and Grease (1978). Similarly in Cyborgs, Santa Claus and Satan: Science Fiction, Fantasy, and Horror Films Made for Television (2009), media scholar Fraser S. Sherman wrote: "This pointless film spends far too much time with teens partying and dancing, and pays much more attention to visuals than to plot."

== Soundtrack ==
The film features eleven songs – ten needle drops and an original number – per the film credits.

- "In the Midnight Hour" by Wilson Pickett
- "Bad Moon Rising" by Creedence Clearwater Revival
- "Li'l Red Riding Hood" by Sam the Sham and the Pharaohs
- "Baby I'm Yours" by Barbara Lewis
- "Mama Told Me Not To Come" by Three Dog Night
- "Devil or Angel" by Bobby Vee
- "How Soon Is Now?" by The Smiths
- "Sea of Love" by Del Shannon
- "Get Dead" by Shari Belafonte-Harper
- "Clap for the Wolfman" by The Guess Who
- "Sea of Love" by Phil Phillips

== See also ==
- List of films set around Halloween
- List of films about witchcraft

== Sources ==
- Dendle, Peter (2001). The Zombie Movie Encyclopedia. McFarland. ISBN 978-0-7864-9288-6.
- Flynn, John L. (1992). Cinematic Vampires: The Living Dead on Film and Television, from The Devil's Castle (1896) to Bram Stoker's Dracula (1992). McFarland. ISBN 978-0-899-50659-3.
- Kay, Glenn (2012). Zombie Movies: The Ultimate Guide. Chicago Review Press. ISBN 978-1-613-74425-3.
- Maltin, Leonard (1987). Leonard Maltin's TV Movies and Video Guide. New American Library. ISBN 978-0-452-25994-2.
- Martin, Mick; Porter, Marsha (2003). DVD and Video Guide 2004. Ballantine Books. ISBN 978-0-345-44994-8.
- Sherman, Fraser S. (2009). Cyborgs, Santa Claus and Satan: Science Fiction, Fantasy and Horror Films Made for Television. McFarland. ISBN 978-1-476-61101-3.
- Stanley, John (2000). Creature Features: The Science Fiction, Fantasy, and Horror Movie Guide. Berkley Boulevard Books. ISBN 978-0-425-17517-0.
