= List of Tropical Heat episodes =

Tropical Heat (known as Sweating Bullets in the United States) is a Canadian action series that aired between 1991 and 1993. In the U.S., the show eventually aired as part of the CBS umbrella series Crimetime After Primetime which aired before the premiere of the Late Show with David Letterman on CBS in 1993. The series ran for three seasons totaling 66 episodes.

Season one of the series was filmed in Puerto Vallarta, Mexico due to tax breaks the production was eligible for under the budding North American Free Trade Agreement (NAFTA). Season two was filmed in Eilat, Israel. Season three was filmed in Pretoria, South Africa, with some sequences shot on the Isle of Mauritius.

== Series overview ==
Season	Episodes	Originally released	
Season	Episodes	First released	Last released
1	9	April 8, 1991	June 3, 1991
2	21	September 9, 1991	June 1, 1992
3	36	September 14, 1992	October 18, 1993

== Episodes ==
=== Season 1 (1991) ===
No. overall	No. in season	Title	Directed by	Written by	Original release date
1	1	"Hard Case"	Tibor Takacs	Angel Flores Marini	April 8, 1991
2	2	"Fowl Play"	Mario Azzopardi	R. Scott Gemmill	April 15, 1991
3	3	"Death's a Beach"	Gerard Ciccoritti	Sam Egan	April 22, 1991
4	4	"Family Affair"	Mario Azzopardi	R. Scott Gemmill	April 29, 1991
5	5	"Roll of the Dice"	Timothy Bond	Tony DiFranco	May 6, 1991
6	6	"Double Time"	Mario Azzopardi	Jeremy Hole	May 13, 1991
7	7	"Forget Me Not"	Mario Azzopardi	Peter Mohan	May 20, 1991
8	8	"For a Song"	Timothy Bond	Tim Burns	May 27, 1991
9	9	"Marissa"	Mario Azzopardi	Andy Heller	June 3, 1991

=== Season 2 (1991–92) ===
No. overall	No. in season	Title	Directed by	Written by	Original release date
10	1	"The Mariah Connection"	Mario Azzopardi	R. Scott Gemmill	September 9, 1991
11	2	"Mafia Mistress"	Mario Azzopardi	Jim Henshaw	September 16, 1991
12	3	"A Perfect .38"	Randy Bradshaw	Jim Henshaw	September 23, 1991
13	4	"Dead Men Tell"	Timothy Bond	Tony DiFranco	September 30, 1991
14	5	"Big Brother is Watching"	Mario Azzopardi	Andy Heller	October 7, 1991
15	6	"This Year's Model"	Jerry Ciccoritti	Peter Mohan	October 14, 1991
16	7	"Writer Wrong"	Randy Bradshaw	Rob Stewart & Jim Gordon	October 21, 1991
17	8	"Runaway"	Mario Azzopardi	Peter Mohan	October 28, 1991
18	9	"Sex, Lies and Lullabies"	Tibor Takacs	Andy Heller	November 4, 1991
19	10	"She"	Mario Azzopardi	John Kent Harrison	November 11, 1991
20	11	"Tara, Tara, Tara" (Note: Cf. film Tora! Tora! Tora!.)	Tibor Takacs	Story by : Tim Dunphy; Teleplay by : Andy Heller	November 18, 1991
21	12	"Abandoned"	Jerry Ciccoritti	Angel Flores Marini	November 25, 1991
22	13	"Deceit"	Mario Azzopardi	Peter Mohan	February 24, 1992
23	14	"Party Girl"	Michael Robinson	Harel Goldstein	April 13, 1992
24	15	"Double Fault"	Sam Firstenberg	Andy Heller	April 20, 1992
25	16	"Alive and Kicking"	Jorge Montesi	Rob Stewart & Jim Gordon	April 27, 1992
26	17	"Tattooed Lady"	Jorge Montesi	Andy Heller	May 4, 1992
27	18	"Users"	Jorge Montesi	Harel Goldstein	May 11, 1992
28	19	"Frame Up"	Sam Firstenberg	R. Scott Gemmill	May 18, 1992
29	20	"Going to the Dogs"	Sam Firstenberg	Peter Mohan	May 25, 1992
30	21	"Dial 9 for Murder"	Clay Borris	Harel Goldstein	June 1, 1992

=== Season 3 (1992–93) ===
No. overall	No. in season	Title	Directed by	Written by	Original release date
31	1	"Twice as Dead"	Clay Borris	Peter Mohan	September 14, 1992
32	2	"Deadly Switch: Part 1"	Sam Firstenberg	Dan Horowitz	September 28, 1992
33	3	"Deadly Switch: Part 2"	Sam Firstenberg	Vince Gritanni	October 5, 1992
34	4	"Over My Dead Body"	Sam Firstenberg & Harel Goldstein	Peter Mohan	October 12, 1992
35	5	"White Hot"	Clay Borris	Ken Gord	October 26, 1992
36	6	"Stranger in Paradise"	Allan Eastman	Sherman Snukel	November 9, 1992
37	7	"The Pro & the Con"	Allan Eastman	Harel Goldstein	November 16, 1992
38	8	"Don't Say Nothin' Bad About My Baby"	Rob Stewart	R. Scott Gemmill	November 23, 1992
39	9	"Ocean Park"	Clay Borris	R. Scott Gemmill	November 30, 1992
40	10	"Jack of Diamonds"	Jorge Montesi	Rob Stewart & Jim Gordon	December 7, 1992
41	11	"His Pal Joey"	Al Waxman	Rob Stewart & Jim Gordon	February 8, 1993
42	12	"Grasping at Shadows"	Clay Borris	Jack Sylvester	February 15, 1993
43	13	"The Last of the Magnificent"	Clay Borris	Jim Henshaw	February 22, 1993
44	14	"The Patsy"	Allan Eastman	Andy Heller	March 1, 1993
45	15	"May Divorce Be with You"	Clay Borris	R. Scott Gemmill	May 3, 1993
46	16	"Feedback"	Clay Borris	Romeo Infantino	May 10, 1993
47	17	"Basic Black"	Clay Borris	Adriaan Walker	May 17, 1993
48	18	"Born Tomorrow"	Clay Borris	Alison Swifter	May 24, 1993
49	19	"Object of Desire"	Rob Stewart	Jim Henshaw	May 31, 1993
50	20	"Royal Pain"	Clay Borris	Andrea Paterno	June 7, 1993
51	21	"Poison Ivy"	Michael Robinson	Jim Gordon	June 14, 1993
52	22	"Massage in a Bottle"	Michael Robinson	Jim Gordon	June 21, 1993
53	23	"Mutiny and the Bounty"	Billy Ruth	J.J. Munro	June 28, 1993
54	24	"Seen at the Crime"	Bob Bralver	Adriaan Walker	July 5, 1993
55	25	"You Stole My Heart"	Rob Stewart	R. Scott Gemmill	July 12, 1993
56	26	"Gun Shy"	Al Waxman	J.J. Munro	July 19, 1993
57	27	"Kiss Kiss Bang Bang"	Billy Ruth	Robin Wranger	July 26, 1993
58	28	"Spider's Tale"	Rob Stewart	Louis Moschello	August 2, 1993
59	29	"Turning Screws"	Clay Borris	David Cliffwood	August 9, 1993
60	30	"Tess"	Allan Eastman	Louis Moschello	August 16, 1993
61	31	"Deal of a Lifetime"	Billy Ruth	J.J. Munro	August 23, 1993
62	32	"Katie's Secret"	Al Waxman	Louis Moschello	September 13, 1993
63	33	"Slummin' It"	Michael Robinson	J.J. Munro	September 20, 1993
64	34	"Man with the Midas Touch"	Michael Robinson	Louis Moschello	September 27, 1993
65	35	"Forbidden Fruit"	Rob Stewart	Jim Gordon	October 4, 1993
66	36	"Smut and Nothin' But" (Note: A phrase from the song "Smut" released on the 1965 Tom Lehrer album That Was the Year That Was.)	Allan Eastman	Wendy Camras	October 18, 1993
