= Otherworld (TV series) =

American sci-fi television series

- Genre: Science fiction
- Written by: Josef Anderson; Coleman Luck; Douglas McIntosh; Roderick Taylor; Bruce A. Taylor
- Directed by: Corey Allen; Richard Compton; Paul Michael Glaser; William Graham; Peter Medak; Thomas J. Wright
- Starring: Sam Groom; Gretchen Corbett; Tony O'Dell; Jonna Lee; Brandon Crane; Chris Hebert; Jonathan Banks
- Theme music composer: Sylvester Levay
- Opening theme: "Otherworld"
- Composers: Sylvester Levay; Jim Roberts
- Country of origin: United States
- Original language: English
- No. of seasons: 1
- No. of episodes: 8

Production
- Executive producer: Roderick Taylor
- Producer: Lew Hunter
- Cinematography: Bradford May
- Editors: David Blum; Diane Rothberg
- Running time: 48 minutes
- Production company: Universal Television

Original release
- Network: CBS
- Release: January 26 – March 16, 1985

Otherworld is an American science fiction television series that aired for eight episodes from January 26 to March 16, 1985 on CBS and was created by Roderick Taylor. The series stars Sam Groom and Gretchen Corbett as Hal and June Sterling, whose family is transported to a parallel world after entering the Great Pyramid of Giza during a rare planetary alignment, and Jonathan Banks as Kommander Nuveen Kroll, a military officer who pursues them. The series aired on Saturday evenings and averaged a 10.4 Nielsen rating for the season. Taylor gave himself a cameo role in each episode. The series was later shown in reruns on the Sci Fi Channel.

== Overview ==
In the first episode, the Sterling family (Hal, June, Trace, Gina, Smith) take a tour of the interior of the Great Pyramid of Giza during a conjunction of the planets which takes place once in ten thousand years. They are mysteriously transported to a planet which may or may not also reside in a parallel universe.

The other planet, Thel, is inhabited by humans (and some androids) and divided into isolated provinces with different governments and ways of life. Travel between provinces is strictly regulated by "Zone Troopers" and the people of one province know nothing of the others. The province of Imar (ruled by a Praetor) appears to be the central seat of government for the whole of the planet. The pilot episode refers to "territories", android creators, and "wars of unification". The Church of Artificial Intelligence is the official state religion of Thel, and no conflicting ideologies are permitted.

Having acquired an access crystal by accident, after a scuffle with a high-ranking Zone Trooper named Commander Kroll (Jonathan Banks) the Sterlings can now access all of the Zones. Kroll then pursues the Sterlings in effort to take back the crystal.

A series of Egyptian-like stone markers (obelisks), each with one eye, are supposed to mark the way to Imar, a city with beautiful buildings and a suspension bridge (the city shown in the opening credits, apparently intended to be Imar, is a photographic negative of New York City).

Each episode has the family dealing with the unfamiliar ways of life in each zone, and at the end of the episode, fleeing one zone for another, pursued by Commander Kroll who seeks the crystal, and also revenge.

== Cast ==
- Sam Groom as Hal Sterling (father)
- Gretchen Corbett as June Sterling (mother)
- Tony O'Dell as Trace Sterling (teenaged son)
- Jonna Lee as Gina Sterling (teenaged daughter)
- Brandon Crane and Chris Hebert as Smith Sterling (youngest son); Crane played Smith in the pilot, which was split into the first and fifth episodes
- Jonathan Banks as Kommander Nuveen Kroll
- Wayne Alexander as Lieutenant Zero (Kommander Kroll's aide)

== Episodes ==
| No. | Title | Directed by | Written by | Original release date |
|---|---|---|---|---|
| 1 | "Rules of Attraction" | William A. Graham | Roderick Taylor | January 26, 1985 |
In the Sarlex province, underground mines are used to produce a material needed for industrial purposes. As humans cannot tolerate the radiation for long, robots were built to do the mining. The robots improved themselves into human-like beings. They are still a subject people, and the Imar authority and the zone troopers can perform "memory audits" to discover information needed for investigations. The Sarlex android people protest it as a violation of their rights. When the Sterling family arrives in this province, problems and a struggle for freedom ensue.
| 2 | "The Zone Troopers Build Men" | Richard Compton | S : Roderick Taylor & Bruce A. Taylor; T : Coleman Luck | February 2, 1985 |
Low marks in school can lead to being drafted for life into the Zone Troopers. Common Troopers cannot resign, do not get leave for any reason, and are the only ones who may operate between Zones. Kroll is guest speaker at the graduation, and administers the oath to the top three cadets who become officers, including Trace. The graduation ceremonies are demanding, and call for extreme measures, including murder. Guest stars Mark Lenard as Perel Sightings, the camp commandant; Brian Thompson and Robert O'Reilly as drill instructors.
| 3 | "Paradise Lost" | Tom Wright | S : Roderick Taylor & Bruce A. Taylor; T : Josef Anderson | February 9, 1985 |
One region of the planet of Thel exhibits the odd phenomena of laser storms: laser bolts shooting from the clouds like falling rain. These laser storms guard an island that appears to be a luxurious resort, but actually is a scientific research facility that has been built upon the former site of an old military base where experiments take place. Currently, doctors are researching the attainment of immortality. Their research exacts an extreme price from the resort's guests. Adding to the Sterling family's trouble is a seductive, young resort official with an amorous interest in Hal.
| 4 | "Rock and Roll Suicide" | Roderick Taylor | Roderick Taylor & Bruce A. Taylor | February 16, 1985 |
In the Centrex province, Trace and Gina introduce rock 'n' roll, and record songs written by the Beatles and other classic artists. The music has an emotional impact that creates passionate fans and foes. The intolerant Church of Artificial Intelligence angrily protests the idol worship of Trace and Gina, whom the church views as subversives undermining their control, and sends both their officials and the Zone Troopers.
| 5 | "Village of the Motorpigs" | Paul Michael Glaser | Roderick Taylor & Bruce A. Taylor | February 23, 1985 |
A raid by a camp of Thel-style hippies rescues the Sterlings from the Zone Troopers, but puts them at the mercy of the camp's leader, who intends to break up the family. Kroll is investigating the assault on a group of the troopers, and arrives too late. Guest star Marjoe Gortner as Chalktrauma.
| 6 | "I Am Woman, Hear Me Roar" | Tom Wright | S : Roderick Taylor; S/T : Bruce A. Taylor & Coleman Luck | March 2, 1985 |
A satirical episode in which the Sterlings find a province in which "Women's lib" is taken to extremes and men are second-class citizens. Men are forcibly relegated to norms and duties that in the Sterling's world are expected of women. When Commander Kroll arrives, his chauvinistic and authoritarian attitudes get him into trouble. Finally, Trace gets into trouble by exposing a chest on a hot day while preparing a barbecue grill in public. He is arrested and, like Kroll, placed on the province's male slave public auction block. A kindly married couple saves Trace from an obnoxious buyer by buying him and secretly releasing him back to his family. The couple remarks that they remember a time when relations between men and women used to be different.
| 7 | "Mansion of the Beast" | Corey Allen | S : Bruce A. Taylor; S/T : Roderick Taylor & Coleman Luck | March 9, 1985 |
The Sterlings pass through lands claimed by a mutated human, a "beast", who lets them go only as long as June stays to be his companion. Hal and the children meet a man who tells them about the "beast", once his brother, but now mutated. Virago now possesses superior knowledge, telepathy and other superhuman powers, and a leonine appearance. His human personality is diminishing as his powers and mutation increases. He is also lonely as he doesn't know the way back to his humanity and June's kindness towards an owl in his forest kindles feeling within him of the love that he lost after mutating. Guest stars Alan Feinstein as Virago and John Astin as Akin.
| 8 | "Princess Metra" | Peter Medak | S : Roderick Taylor & Bruce A. Taylor; T : Douglas Lloyd McIntosh | March 16, 1985 |
Gina is believed to be the long-lost princess Metra in a province where one of the royal household's icons is a 200-year-old John F. Kennedy half-dollar. Gina accepts the post, and the Sterling family discovers a group of power-holders who don't want to give up their control, as well as "rebels" who are sick of being controlled. After stopping a potentially murderous coup, the Sterlings introduce the principles of democracy to the province. The Kennedy half-dollar's age makes the Sterlings wonder what year it will be if they ever get home. Time appears to pass at a different rate on Thel than on Earth. Guest-starring Carolyn Seymour as the Prime Manager.

== Syndication ==
The series was rerun on the USA Network, and re-shown several times on the Sci-Fi Channel. Otherworld was aired in the United Kingdom on the ITV network, except in the Thames/LWT region.
