= Tropical Heat =

Television series

- Genre: Action
- Created by: Sam Egan
- Starring: Rob Stewart; Carolyn Dunn; Ian Tracey
- Opening theme: "Any Way the Wind Blows"
- Composer: Fred Mollin
- Country of origin: Canada
- Original language: English
- No. of seasons: 3
- No. of episodes: 66 (list of episodes)

Production
- Producers: Harrell Goldstein; David Goldstein; Myron Nash
- Production locations: Puerto Vallarta, Mexico; Eilat, Israel; Pretoria, South Africa; Mauritius
- Running time: approx. 48 minutes

Original release
- Network: CBS (United States)
- Release: April 8, 1991 – October 18, 1993

Related
- Criss Cross

Tropical Heat (known as Sweating Bullets in the United States) is a Canadian action series produced in co-operation with Mexico and Israel, that aired between April 8, 1991, and October 18, 1993.

The series ran for three seasons totaling 66 episodes. Season one was filmed in Puerto Vallarta, Mexico, due to tax breaks the production was eligible for under the North American Free Trade Agreement (NAFTA). Season two was filmed in Eilat, Israel. Season three was filmed in Pretoria, South Africa, with some sequences shot in Mauritius. In the United States, it aired as part of the CBS umbrella series Crimetime After Primetime.

== Plot ==
The plot revolves around private investigator, Nick Slaughter, an ex-DEA agent, who after arriving in the fictional resort town of Key Mariah, Florida, and setting up a detective agency there, meets up with local tourist agent, beautiful Sylvie Girard, to solve a variety of different cases.

When the series was dubbed into the Spanish language for Spanish television, the series location was changed as being set in the Caribbean American Virgin Islands.

== Cast ==
- Rob Stewart as Nick Slaughter
- Carolyn Dunn as Sylvie Girard
- John David Bland as Ian Stewart (1991–92)
- Ian Tracey as Spider Garvin (1992–93)
- Eugene Clark as Ollie Porter (1991–92)
- Pedro Armendáriz Jr. as Lt. Carillo (1991–92)
- Ari Sorko-Ram as Sgt. Gregory (1992–93)
- Allen Nashman as Rollie (1992–93)
- Graeme Campbell as Rupert

Notable Guest Stars and Cameos:

- Rachel Weisz Made one of her earliest screen appearances on the show
- Traci Lords Appeared as Gwen in the episode "Katie's Secret"
- Kelly Rowan Known for Lonesome Dove: The Outlaw Years, she appeared in the series.
- Mia Kirshner Appeared in the series
- Clint Walker The Cheyenne star appeared as "Dead Eye Dixon" in the 1991 episode "Last of the Magnificent"
- Lawrence Taylor The NFL hall-of-famer appeared in the series
- Edita Brychta Appeared as Liz Sage in "The Pro and the Con"
- Geraint Wyn Davies Appeared as Frank Halstead in "For a Song"

== Series overview ==
Season	Episodes	Originally released	
Season	Episodes	First released	Last released
1	9	April 8, 1991	June 3, 1991
2	21	September 9, 1991	June 1, 1992
3	36	September 14, 1992	October 18, 1993

== Popularity in Serbia ==
Nick Slaughter portrayed in Serbian comic "Strip protest", by Aleksa Gajić, released during the 1996–97 students' protests against Slobodan Milošević's regime.

The series was particularly popular in Serbia, where it gained cult status. In a tumultuous social environment – with a UN trade embargo imposed on the country and civil war raging nearby – Nick Slaughter's character became a tongue-in-cheek role model, particularly among urban youth, and eventually a symbol of opposition politics.

During the 1990s, the series was broadcast on four Serbian television stations – TV Politika (1992–93), NS+ (1993–94), RTS 3K (1994–95), and RTV Pink (1996–97) – and rerun numerous times. Aside from its dry humor and exciting plot, the show was extremely well received because its idyllic tropical island atmosphere was an absolute contrast to mid-1990s Serbia. The reruns in the then-isolated country made the show immensely popular, turning it into a minor national cultural phenomenon.

Apparently, no one associated with the show was aware of its extraordinary popularity in Serbia until December 2008 when Canadian actor Rob Stewart who played Nick Slaughter in the series accidentally discovered it by stumbling upon a Facebook fan group named "Tropical Heat/Nick Slaughter" with some 17,000 (mostly Serbian) followers. After familiarizing himself with the cause and the circumstances of his Serbian fame, the mostly unemployed 48-year-old Stewart, along with a filmmaker friend Marc Vespi and his sister Liza, decided to attempt to make Slaughter Nick for President, a documentary about it. To that end, they contacted the band Atheist Rap and it was soon arranged for Rob to appear on stage as their guest at the To Be Punk Festival in Novi Sad on June 6.

By late March 2009 the news was leaked to Serbian press and several media outlets carried items that Rob Stewart would be coming to Serbia in May or early June as guest of Atheist Rap in order to film a documentary on his character's popularity in the country during the 1990s. Stewart and his partners contacted Srđa Popović, former activist of Otpor!, the Serbian student movement that played a significant role in eventually bringing down Milošević. On June 3, 2009, Stewart arrived in Belgrade to a hero's welcome with enormous media attention afforded to his visit. With Atheist Rap and Popović as their hosts and guides through Serbia, and in between the documentary shooting schedule, Stewart made the media rounds, appearing on talk shows (Piramida and Fajront Republika), giving interviews, and making public appearances such as planting of the maple trees in Žarkovo with John Morrison, Canadian ambassador to Serbia.

Stewart believed that the popularity of the show was due to its portrayal of Nick Slaughter as a bumbling idiot. Despite his flaws, however, Slaughter was brave, honest and caring. Stewart noted that the Serbs have a very "self-deprecating" sense of humor, so Slaughter's bumbling idiot qualities appealed to them. Stewart also noted during his visit to Serbia that he was told by countless people that they loved the character because of his indomitable qualities and his refusal to give up, which matches with the Serb self-image.

As a result of their June 2009 stay in Belgrade and Novi Sad, a six-minute documentary promo was put together and entered in the Roma Fiction Fest in Rome, Italy on July 8, 2009 under the "work in progress" section.

Released in 2012 (runtime: 73 minutes), the documentary ‘’Slaughter Nick for President’’ is currently available to stream for free via Tubi, PLEX, and YouTube Movies & TV channel. A summary reads: “An actor from Canada discovers that he is a national sensation in Serbia and decides to visit the country to see why.” Many reviewers found the story of a forgotten TV actor finding immense fame in a distant land to be charming and genuinely moving. According to OregonLive, “The documentary is a collaborative effort often compared to Searching for Sugar Man of schlock TV.”

Mike McGranaghan, movie critic of Aisleseat.com, reviews: “There are two things that make “Slaughter Nick for President” fascinating. First and foremost, it serves as a dissection of fame. In this day and age where entertainment is a global business, anything thrown into the ether can make an impact somewhere in the world. Even a cheesy '90s “Baywatch” ripoff. Rob Stewart, a humble and likeable guy, is awestruck by the love Serbians have for him. He clearly enjoys soaking up the adulation he never got in the U.S. or his native Canada. Secondly, the film works on a political level. How astonishing is it that the Nick Slaughter character took on such prominence during a time of great unrest and strife? Stewart interviews a number of people, including the guy who brought the show to Serbian airwaves, about how this happened...”Slaughter Nick for President” tells a story so unlikely and so improbable that you will be delighted in hearing it, just as I was. It's proof that sometimes truth really is stranger than fiction. Do what it takes to see this massively entertaining documentary.“

‘’Slaughter Nick for President’’ won the Golden Pram (Zlatna Kolica) award for Best Documentary Film at the 2012 Zagreb Film Festival (ZFF) in Croatia. Originally known as the Golden Bib, it is a significant accolade in Eastern European cinema, primarily focusing on debut or second-time directors.

Audience reception for “Slaughter Nick for President” lands at 67% on the Rotten Tomatoes Popcornmeter, with viewers awarding it an average of 4.2 out of 5 stars.

== Movie sequel ==
Two episodes of the show were re-edited into a feature-length film, Criss Cross. IMDb states this received a release in 2001.

== Home media ==
Tango Entertainment released the complete series on DVD on January 8, 2008 in a 9-disc set entitled Tropical Heat: Sweating Bullets Complete series.

On March 16, 2021, Mill Creek Entertainment released Tropical Heat- The Complete Series on DVD in Region 1.
