= Shayna Rose =

American actress (born 1983)

- Born: Shayna Rose Mordue; November 3, 1983 (age 43); Morgantown, Pennsylvania, U.S.
- Occupation: Actress
- Years active: 2004–present
- Spouse: Arthur Gradstein (m. 2011; div. 2016)
- Children: 1

Shayna Rose (born Shayna Rose Mordue; November 3, 1983) is an American actress.

== Early life ==
Rose moved to Los Angeles in 2002 after declining a scholarship to the Berklee College of Music in Boston. She went between acting, singing, songwriting, auditions, and two jobs.

== Career ==
Rose started performing and singing professionally when she was eight years old and appeared in a variety of regional musicals, including "Into the Woods" starring as Little Red Riding Hood at the Denver Civic Theater / Feast of Fools Theatre. She was nominated for best supporting actress by the Denver Drama Critics Circle for her role as Mary Tilford in "The Children's Hour". In this time period she also appeared in a number of national commercials.

Rose started to land parts in such series as Gilmore Girls, Ugly Betty and Commander in Chief. Her musical showcases and songwriting also began attracting more interest. On July 4, 2006, Shayna Rose joined the cast of Days of Our Lives in a contract role of Stephanie Johnson, daughter of super-couple Steve Johnson and Kayla Brady. In late November 2006, she was let go from Days after five months. Her last episode aired on January 18.

In 2009, Rose became a member of Nick Jr.'s ensemble, The Fresh Beat Band, portraying Marina, the talented drummer.

In mid-June to July 2011, Nickelodeon revealed that Rose would depart from the series following its second season to explore new ventures and marry Arthur Gradstein, a union that ultimately ended in divorce in 2016. Subsequently, Tara Perry took over the role of Marina in the third season.

In 2013, Rose created a new musical series for kids called Shayna's Place.

== Filmography ==
| Year | Film | Role | Notes |
|---|---|---|---|
| 2004 | Gilmore Girls | Girl #2 | Episode: "You Jump, I Jump, Jack" |
| 2005 | Commander In Chief | Onlooker #5 | Episode: "First Disaster" |
| 2006–2007 | Days of Our Lives | Stephanie Johnson | 54 episodes |
| 2007 | Ugly Betty | The Younger Wench | Episode: "Secretaries' Day" |
| 2007 | Mad Men | Rosemary | Episode: "Red in the Face" |
| 2009–2011 | The Fresh Beat Band | Marina | Main role (Seasons 1-2) |
| 2010 | My McDiet | Herself | |
