= Jonna Lee (actress) =

American actress

- Born: Jonna Lee Pangburn; Glendale, California, U.S.
- Education: Otis College of Art and Design; Claremont Graduate University
- Occupation: Actress
- Years active: 1982–1999
- Known for: Otherworld; Making the Grade
- Spouse: Kevin Dennis (1995-present)
- Children: 2
- Website: jonnalee.net

This is an article about the American actress. For the Swedish singer, see Jonna Lee (singer).

Jonna Lee is an American television and film actress.

== Career ==
Born Jonna Lee Pangburn in Glendale, California, Lee graduated from John Burroughs High School in Burbank, California in 1981, After high school, she moved to Hollywood and maintained an acting career through the 1980s after being an extra in the film Zapped, including Murder, She Wrote, and playing a lead role in her film debut, acting opposite Judd Nelson in the 1984 film Making The Grade.

In 1985, Lee also co-starred as the teenage daughter Gina in the TV series Otherworld, which ran on CBS for eight episodes. The series was rebroadcast in 1993 on the Sci Fi channel, and Lee appeared in informative spots about Otherworld and also appeared as the Los Angeles correspondent on the SciFi channel's Inside Space.

In 1988, Lee starred in the made-for-television movie Shattered Innocence, which was loosely based on the life, career, and eventual suicide of adult film actress Shauna Grant.

In 1999, she retired from acting and moved back to Burbank, where she currently resides while working as an artist/sculptor.

== Personal life ==
Lee has been married to her childhood sweetheart since June 21, 1995. The couple has two children.

According to her Facebook page, she was the 1994 valedictorian at Otis College of Art and Design and graduated Claremont Graduate University in 1996. She was the president of War Angel, Inc. in Burbank, California but that corporation has dissolved.

== Filmography ==
- Chained Heat (1983)
- Making the Grade (1984)
- Sam's Son (1984)
- Lovelines (1984)
- The Midnight Hour (1985)
- Monster in the Closet (1986)
- Turnaround (1987)

=== Television ===
- T.J. Hooker (1 episode, 1983)
- Lottery! (1 episode, 1983)
- Quarterback Princess (1983)
- Another World (Unknown episodes, 1983)
- Jessie (1 episode, 1984)
- Otherworld (8 episodes, 1985)
- Hail to the Chief (1 episode, 1985)
- The Midnight Hour (1985)
- Hardcastle and McCormick (1 episode, 1985)
- Airwolf (1 episode, 1986)
- Growing Pains (1 episode, 1986)
- The New Mike Hammer (1 episode, 1987)
- Family Ties (1 episode, 1987)
- Silver Spoons (1 episode, 1987)
- Valerie (1 episode, 1988)
- Shattered Innocence (1988)
- Murder, She Wrote (2 episodes, 1987–1990)
