= Scott Kraft =

American actor

- Occupations: Actor, producer, writer
- Years active: 1983–present
- Spouse: Nadine van der Velde (m. 1992)

Scott Kraft is an American actor, writer, and producer.

== Early life ==
Kraft obtained his Bachelor of Arts from the University of Pennsylvania and an MFA from Antioch University. Kraft co-wrote the 1992 action-drama The Silencer with Amy Goldstein. He co-starred in the film For the Moment alongside Russell Crowe, Christianne Hirt and Wanda Cannon, for which he received a Genie Award nomination for Best Supporting Actor in 1994.

== Career ==
Kraft has been nominated for five Emmy Awards and has won two Daytime Emmys. His first Emmy was for his work on the William Joyce/Nelvana/Disney Channel show Rolie Polie Olie—he wrote and/or story edited over 30 episodes of the CGI show—and his second for Outstanding Music Direction and Composition for the Nick Jr show The Fresh Beat Band. Kraft has also written multiple episodes of the Nick Jr. show Miss Spider’s Sunny Patch Kids. He has story edited or written episodes of Gerald McBoing Boing, Martin Mystery, Stickin’ Around, and a feature-length Rolie Polie Olie special. He was story editor and writer/producer on 26 episodes of William Joyce's George Shrinks for Nelvana/PBS. He co-wrote the indie feature East of A, which screened at film festivals, including the Seattle Film Fest, Stockholm, Dublin, Outfest and San Francisco. Kraft has taught screenwriting at the UCLA Writer's Extension. Kraft partnered with his wife, Nadine Van der Velde, and created the production and development company Popskull Inc. which is responsible for the Nick Jr. live action music show The Fresh Beat Band. Kraft co-created and executive producesThe Fresh Beat Band. He has also co-written and music produced over 60 songs for the show, which first aired on August 24, 2009. Kraft was nominated for a 2012 Daytime Emmy in Outstanding Achievement in Main Title and Graphic Design as director/executive producer of The Fresh Beat Band's season 3 main titles.

Scott Kraft was nominated for two 2013 Daytime Emmys in the categories of Outstanding Pre-School Children's Series and Outstanding Achievement in Music Direction and Composition for his work as executive producer on The Fresh Beat Band. On June 14, 2013, Scott Kraft and The Fresh Beat Band team won a Daytime Emmy for Music Direction and Composition. Scott Kraft is Executive Producer and Story Editor for the Nick Jr. Channel's show Paw Patrol.

Scott also he happens to be the executive producer of Press Start! on Peacock.
