= Nicholas Callaway =

American producer & publisher (born 1953)

Nicholas Callaway (b. 1953) is an app producer, book publisher, television producer, writer and photographer.

== Career ==
Callaway is the founder and CEO of Callaway Arts & Entertainment, a company that publishes illustrated books, mobile applications, animated television series, and "branded lifestyle products". The company's book publishing division, specializes in the design, production and publication of high-quality illustrated books on the arts, design, fashion and photography. Titles include: The Beatles: Get Back, Leonardo by Leonardo, by Martin Kemp, The Sistine Chapel Trilogy, Mark Rothko by Arne Glimcher, Alfred Stieglitz: Photographs & Writings, Georgia O'Keeffe ’s One Hundred Flowers, Irving Penn’s Passage, 'Madonna's Sex, Diana: Portrait of A Princess by Jayne Fincher, The Art of Make-Up by Kevyn Aucoin, A Nation Challenged: A Visual History of 9/11 and its Aftermath, a series of children's books by Madonna beginning with The English Roses, the Callaway Classics series of fairy tales, and OBAMA: The Historic Journey, co-published with The New York Times. In October 2023 Callaway published Bob Dylan: Mixing Up the Medicine a career-spanning magnum opus that is the most comprehensive book yet published on the work of Nobel Prize-winning singer-songwriter-poet and cultural icon Bob Dylan. It features over 1,100 images by 90 photographers and filmmakers, many never-before seen or published, as well as 30 original essays by leading artists and writers focusing on unseen treasure from the Bob Dylan Archive. The book's introduction is by Sean Wilentz with and epilogue by Douglas Brinkley.

In 2012, he co-founded and was the CEO, then Chairman of Happy Studio, a company for the development of lifestyle apps for Apple's iOS devices, with headquarters on Union Square in New York City.

The company's first product, Martha Stewart CraftStudio, was released in partnership with Martha Stewart Living Omnimedia on June 21, 2012.

In August 2010, with an investment from Kleiner, Perkins, Caufield, and Byers, Callaway founded Callaway Digital Arts (CDA), which publishes children’s applications for Apple’s iPad, iPhone, and iPod family of products. All of CDA’s apps have risen to No. 1 in their category in the App Store, including Miss Spider’s Tea Party, Miss Spider’s Bedtime Story, Sesame Street’s The Monster at the End of This Book and Thomas & Friends: Misty Island Rescue, and the early learning literacy and numeracy series, Endless Alphabet.

In 1994, Callaway published Miss Spider's Tea Party by David Kirk, which has sold 5 million copies worldwide. Subsequently, Nicholas Callaway and David Kirk founded Callaway & Kirk Company LLC, which is dedicated exclusively to the creations of David Kirk. Other products include: more than seventy Miss Spider titles; the CGI Nova the Robot book series; the Sunny Patch line of children's lifestyle products featured at Target stores for 7 years and subsequently acquired by the educational toy company Melissa & Doug; and Miss Spider's Sunny Patch Friends, an animated television series that has aired on Nick Jr. in the US and in many other countries around the world since its debut in 2005.

Nicholas Callaway graduated from Harvard University in 1975 with degrees in Classics and Fine Arts; he studied with Robert Fitzgerald and Emily Vermeule. He undertook early fine art photography and design studies at MIT with the founder of Aperture, Minor White, with designer Muriel Cooper, and with portrait photographer Wendy Snyder MacNeil.

From 1977 to 1979 Callaway was the first director of Galerie Zabriskie in Paris, where he curated and mounted many notable photography exhibitions, (many for the first time in Europe) including Harry Callahan, Lee Friedlander, Henri Cartier-Bresson, Eugène Atget, Berenice Abbott, Ansel Adams, William Klein, Man Ray and others. His final exhibition, French Avant Garde Photography Between the Wars, rediscovered for the first time photographers including Brassaï, Dora Maar, Claude Cahun, Eli Lotar, Germaine Krull, Roger Parry, Maurice Tabard, Jean Moral and Moï-Ver.

Callaway's photographs and writings have been published in Aperture (cover of Octave of Prayer, 1972 and Celebrations, 1975), Departures magazine andVanity Fair.

== Personal life ==
He is a member of the Callaway family whose modern-day enterprises include Callaway Gardens, Callaway Golf Company and Callaway Cars.
