= Miss Spider's Sunny Patch Kids =

2003 television film

- Written by: Nadine van der Velde
- Directed by: Mike Fallows; Kevin McDonagh (timing director)
- Voices of: Brooke Shields; Rick Moranis; Tony Jay; Marc Donato; Julie Lemieux; Aaryn Doyle; Alexander Lai; Scott Beaudin; Rebecca Brenner; Mitchell Eisner
- Music by: Jeff Danna
- Country of origin: Canada
- Original language: English

Production
- Executive producers: Nicholas Callaway; David Kirk; Scott Dyer; Michael Hirsh; Paul Robertson; Nadine van der Velde
- Producer: Susie Grondin
- Running time: 49 minutes
- Production companies: Metro-Goldwyn-Mayer; Nelvana Limited; Callaway Entertainment

Original release
- Network: Nickelodeon (United States); Treehouse TV (Canada)
- Release: March 31, 2003

Miss Spider's Sunny Patch Kids is a 2003 animated television special produced by Nelvana in association with Callaway Entertainment and distributed on home video by MGM Home Entertainment via MGM Kids. It serves as the pilot for the show Miss Spider's Sunny Patch Friends. It aired on Nickelodeon in the United States and on Treehouse TV in Canada on March 31, 2003, a year before the series began. The special was based on David Kirk's book series of the same name, as well as the Sunny Patch brand of toys that Kirk designed. The special features well-known celebrity voices including US actress Brooke Shields as the voice of Miss Spider, Rick Moranis as the voice of Holley, and Tony Jay as the voice of Spiderus.

== Plot ==
Miss Flora Spider has been living happily with her new husband Holley, but becomes nervous when she lays five eggs. She worries about becoming a mother, since her own mother abandoned her before she hatched. But her adoptive mother, Betty Beetle, tells her that she has nothing to worry about. When the eggs hatch into five spiderlings, the family becomes overjoyed.

Years pass and as the spiderlings grow up, the family finds a giant egg and decorate it. Thinking its mother is looking for it, Squirt, one of the spiderlings, decides to return it. While going through the forest, he comes upon three orphans: Dragon the dragonfly, Shimmer the jewel beetle, and Bounce the bedbug who are bandits living in the forest. When Squirt explains that he is looking for the egg's mother, Bounce reveals that they do not have parents themselves, although Dragon says that they are still looking for them. Shimmer decides that they should tag along and help Squirt.

Suddenly, Spiderus, a short-tempered white spider who became jealous after Miss Spider chose Holley over him, arrives and tries to devour Dragon. The children manage to drive him away. Meanwhile, Miss Spider has discovered that Squirt is missing and fears for the worst. She and Holley decide to search for him. With the help of Spiderus, who now agrees to help in the rescue mission.

Snow starts to fall, as the children find Stinky, a stinkbug, in his home. They take shelter there until morning. Spiderus falls in love with Spindella. The children arrive at a barn, where a chicken, the mother of the egg, attacks Squirt, but Miss Spider and Holley arrive and save him.

The egg hatches and is reunited with the chicken. Squirt introduces his new friends to Miss Spider who decides to adopt them, since she herself understands how it feels to be orphaned, along with eight being a perfect number to her. They are all overjoyed and return home. As all the children sleep, Miss Spider understands that it does not matter what the other bugs are, all that matters is that they are all family.

Squirt is eventually thought to be missing again, but he is soon found outside, flying on his web. The other children wake up and run outside and play.

== Voice cast ==
- Brooke Shields as Miss Spider
- Scott Beaudin as Squirt
- Rebecca Brenner as Shimmer
- Mitchell Eisner as Dragon
- Julie Lemieux as Bounce
- Rick Moranis as Holley
- Tony Jay as Spiderus
- Mary-Frances Buffery as Little Miss Spider
- Marc Donato as Wiggle
- Aaryn Doyle as Pansy / Baby Earwig / Snowdrop (singing voice)
- Austin Di Iulio as Spinner
- Patricia Gage as Betty Beetle
- Catherine Gallant as Beatrice
- Emily Hampshire as Katie
- Alexandra Lai as Snowdrop (speaking voice)
- Scott McCord as Stinky
- Phil McCordick as Flint
- Stephanie Morgenstern as Ladybug
- Kristina Nicoll as Spindella
- Peter Oldring as Gus
- Ezra Perlman as Eddy
- Cara Pifko as Eunice
- Wayne Robson as Mr. Mantis
- Alison Sealy-Smith as Mama Snake
- Robert Smith as Pillbug
- Robert Tinkler as Grub
- Jonathan Wilson as Ant 1
- Philip Williams as Ant 2

== See also ==
- List of animated feature films
- List of computer-animated films
- List of children's films
