= Miss Spider apps =

Miss Spider Apps are children's apps for the iPad, iPhone, and iPod Touch published by Callaway Digital Arts. They can be purchased in Apple's App Store and feature the beloved character Miss Spider, who also appears in the bestselling books by David Kirk and the Nick Jr. Channel program Miss Spider's Sunny Patch Friends.

The apps contain a storybook with spoken narration and animations when certain images are pressed; an animated movie of the story; a memory game; several jigsaw puzzles; and a painting game.

== Apps in series ==
1. Miss Spider's Tea Party: Available for iPad in American English, British English, French, Spanish, German, and Japanese; and for the iPhone and iPod Touch in American English.
2. Miss Spider's Bedtime Story: Currently available for iPad only.

== Modes of play ==
=== Read ===
In "Read" mode, the Miss Spider apps function mostly like a book, with words displayed under pictures. Users can click on the bottom of the screen to "turn the page," and when they touch the picture, faint white circles appear that animate characters or other aspects of the picture when touched. There is also an optional narration mode, where the book is read aloud.

=== Watch ===
In "Watch" mode, the story is turned into a movie, animated with Computer-generated imagery. Words along the bottom are highlighted as they are spoken. In Miss Spider's Tea Party, the storybook version is followed exactly, whereas in Miss Spider's Bedtime Story, some additional elements are added.

=== Match ===
Match mode works just like a Miss Spider–themed memory game. Users click on overturned "cards" to see if they match. Miss Spider's Tea Party featured 30 cards, while in Miss Spider's Bedtime Story, users can choose between 16 and 30 cards.

=== Paint ===
Paint mode presents users with several different black-and-white images of Miss Spider and other characters in the book, and several different "brushes" and colors. Users select a color and a brush size, then "paint" the pictures using a finger. Users can save images to the iPad's Camera Roll. To "clear" the image, users shake the iPad.

=== Puzzle ===
Puzzle mode features six different Miss Spider–themed jigsaw puzzles. Users move the pieces into place with their fingers. An animation displays upon completion.

== Plots ==
=== Miss Spider's Tea Party ===
Lonely Miss Spider has made tea for ten, but "nobuggy" will have tea with her! She approaches various bugs she hopes will be her friends, but they're scared away by her spidery reputation. Soon, however, they realize she's a friendly spider who only eats flowers, and Miss Spider finally gets her tea party.

=== Miss Spider's Bedtime Story ===
Based on an episode from the Nick Jr. Channel program Miss Spider's Sunny Patch Friends, Miss Spider's Bedtime Story tells the story of Miss Spider and her husband, Holley, trying to get their children to go to bed on time. After spinning a web to help their children plot their goal of going to bed on time for an entire week, Miss Spider and Holley meet success. But they still can't seem to get to bed on time themselves!

== Reception ==
Miss Spider's Tea Party was released on the same day as the iPad, April 3, 2010. It was one of the first children's apps developed especially for the iPad.

USA Today's Jinny Gudmundson gave the app 4 out of 4 stars and said, "David Kirk's popular children's book really shines on the iPad, particularly while watching it as an animated movie with words highlighted as it is read aloud."

Gizmodo named the app one of the "Best Apps for Babies, Toddlers, and Sanity-Loving Parents" and said, "These folks are genius, and when you take that and layer in impressive animation, music and narration, it's just got to cost some money. This is apparently the first of many Miss Spider iPad apps, which is good for my kid, bad for my credit card."

Macgasm.com said "This is one app that I have been recommending to our friends that have children. As I mentioned earlier, I couldn’t get my iPad back from my son because he was so taken by this wonderful application. We recently went to dinner, and I brought the iPad with us. The first thing my son went to use was Miss Spider’s Tea Party. Shortly after he started to use it, we had a small crowd of employees form near our table. Everyone thought it was great, and our waitress even said that she could see her daughter using this application. When an application such as this brings parents and children together you know you have transcended."

Miss Spider's Bedtime Story was released on September 22, 2010. Padgadget.com said, "Miss Spider’s Bedtime Story for iPad includes the same great features and quality we love from Callaway. Kids and parents will enjoy reading, watching and playing with Miss Spider and her family of bugs in this brightly colored story and game app."
