= List of Miss Spider's Sunny Patch Friends episodes =

This is a list of episodes of the animated children's television series, Miss Spider's Sunny Patch Friends, created by David Kirk. 43 episodes were originally produced over three seasons from 2004 to 2007.

== Series overview ==
Season	Episodes	Originally released	
Season	Episodes	First released	Last released
1	13	September 7, 2004	May 2, 2005
2	13	December 10, 2004	June 27, 2006
3	17	March 22, 2006	June 17, 2007
Special		July 24, 2006	

== Episodes ==
=== Season 1 (2004–2005) ===
No. overall	No. in season	Title	Directed by	Written by	Original release date	Prod. code
1	1	"I'll Fly Away"	Neil Affleck	Nadine van der Velde	September 7, 2004	101
1	1	"All Pupa'ed Out"	Neil Affleck	Scott Kraft and Nadine van der Velde	September 7, 2004	101
When two dragonfly barnstormers, the Flying Aces, visit Sunny Patch, Dragon is suddenly faced with a tough dilemma stay with the other spider family, or wants to join for a life of flight. Squirt and Shimmer find an orphaned baby caterpillar named Cookie in the meadow. They ask Miss Spider and Holley if they can adopt and take care of her, only to get more work than they bargained for.
2	2	"Country Bug-Kin"	Neil Affleck	Steve Sullivan	September 8, 2004	104
2	2	"A Star Fell on Sunny Patch"	Neil Affleck	Steve Sullivan	September 8, 2004	104
Squirt is embarrassed by his small town when an orphaned cockroach named Sweetie is blown by the wind into Sunny Patch. He is envious of his new friend’s “big city ways.” When the Spider family go out stargazing with Uncle Gus, Squirt makes a wish and finds a yellow bottle cap thinking it's a fallen star.
3	3	"A Little Slow"	Neil Affleck	Robin Stein	September 9, 2004	105
3	3	"Stalking the Beanstalk"	Neil Affleck and Lynn Reist	Scott Kraft	September 9, 2004	105
Shelley, a slow snail, goes on a hike with the bug scouts and teaches Miss Spider’s faster moving brood. The kids learn a lesson about patience when Squirt's friend Shelley the Snail tags along with them on their hike. Ned and Ted trade moth eggs for Shimmer and Bounce's pies, telling the children that they are magic beans.
4	4	"Fly Away Friends"	Lynn Reist	Michael Stokes	September 10, 2004	109
4	4	"Bedtime Story"	Neil Affleck	Scott Kraft	September 10, 2004	109
Squirt feels left out when his two adopted winged siblings, Shimmer and Dragon, have high-flying fun that a spider cannot join in. Miss Spider and Holley try to get their children to go to bed on time, only to make thing go awry.
5	5	"The Marin Rose"	Neil Affleck	Michael Stokes	September 13, 2004	107
5	5	"A Sticky Situation"	Neil Affleck	Dave Dias	September 13, 2004	107
After hearing a bedtime story about knights protecting a mythical rose, Shimmer tries to prevent the mischievous Spiderus from picking the most beautiful flower in Sunny Patch. The bugs find a honeycomb and Spiderus gets stuck in tree sap and has to be rescued before getting amberlized.
6	6	"Sing It Sister"	Lynn Reist	Steve Sullivan	September 14, 2004	110
6	6	"Ant-tuition"	Neil Affleck	Nadine van der Velde	September 14, 2004	110
The entire family see the Dribbly Dell Singers, an acapella group who are doing tryouts since one of their singers moved away. Pansy wants to be a part of the group, but her feelings get hurt when her twin sister, Snowdrop, steals the role in the group. A first frost is nearing Sunny Patch and all the bugs are working to put away storage for the winter, but Squirt would rather have fun.
7	7	"Something's Stinky in Sunny Patch"	Neil Affleck	Alice Prodanou	September 15, 2004	103
7	7	"The Listening Walk"	Neil Affleck	Alice Prodanou	September 15, 2004	103
Opened in a Private-Eye style mystery, Stinky investigates the case of the missing tree bark from Mr. Mantis' house. Spiderus accuses Shimmer of eating the bark and spreads the rumor. When Wiggle cannot sleep because he is scared of nighttime noises, Miss Spider takes him on a listening walk around Sunny Patch.
8	8	"Wiggle's Squiggles"	Neil Affleck	Steve Sullivan	September 16, 2004	112
8	8	"Basketberry Blues"	Lynn Reist	Elizabeth Keyishian and David Wilks	September 16, 2004	112
The bugs learn at school how to collect "colors" from the meadow to paint. Wiggle is excited to show his painting off, but after seeing Shimmer's painting which looked like a perfect recreation, he gets discouraged. The bugs are trying out for basketberry, Sunny Patch's version of basketball.
9	9	"What a Tangled Web"	Lynn Reist	Dave Dias	September 17, 2004	111
9	9	"Cry Buggie"	Neil Affleck	Michael Stokes	September 17, 2004	111
Squirt accidentally leaves all of his leftover webs all over Sunny Patch and instead of cleaning it up, he goes off to play. Squirt bottles up his feelings after Dragon teases him about sharing his feelings with others.
10	10	"A Scary Scaley Tale"	Lynn Reist	Michael Stokes	October 25, 2004	113
10	10	"A Bug-A-Boo Day Play"	Neil Affleck	Steve Sullivan	October 25, 2004	113
The bugs find a snakeskin and use it to scare everyone in Sunny Patch. It is "Bug-A-Boo Day" and Shimmer is trying to put on the perfect play.
11	11	"Happy Heartwood Day"	Lynn Reist	Alice Prodanou	February 14, 2005	108
11	11	"Ground House Rules"	Lynn Reist	Robin Stein	February 14, 2005	108
The bugs all celebrate "Heartwood Day". The children find a new play area at the bottom of the Hollow Tree.
12	12	"Family Circus"	Neil Affleck	Scott Kraft	March 14, 2005	106
12	12	"Eight Is Not Enough"	Lynn Reist	Alice Prodanou	March 14, 2005	106
The children get out of hand while waiting for the circus. To improve their behavior, Miss Spider shows them the wishing web. Miss Spider and Holley are busy trying to keep up with their little buggies' activities and become overworked very quickly.
13	13	"Bug Your Mom Day"	Neil Affleck	Steve Sullivan	May 2, 2005	102
13	13	"A Cloudy Day in Sunny Patch"	Neil Affleck	Steve Sullivan	May 2, 2005	102
While Miss Spider and Betty Beetle are on a date with each other, the children make a competition out of giving their mother the best gift for "Bug Your Mom Day". Though Holley is reluctant, the kids make another gift for plan B, only to get stuck in the web. Shimmer's hatchday party is nearly ruined when a storm rolls in.

=== Season 2 (2004–2006) ===
No. overall	No. in season	Title	Directed by	Written by	Original release date	Prod. code
14	1	"Hum Bug" "Dashing Through the Snow"	Neil Affleck Lynn Reist	Scott Kraft Nadine van der Velde and Scott Kraft	December 10, 2004	114
Miss Spider's children are all excited to be visited by the "Dream Bug" for doing good deeds. It is "Jolly Holly Day" and the Spider family is celebrating the holiday at home in the Hollow Tree, but Miss Spider, Squirt and Bounce are caught out in a snowstorm and must find their way out.
15	2	"Taste-Bugs" "Top O'Big Tree"	Neil Affleck Lynn Reist	Alice Prodanou Scott Kraft	March 15, 2005	116
Bounce learns to try new things. The bugs climb the biggest tree in Sunny Patch.
16	3	"No-See-Um is Believin'!" "A Little Bug Music"	Lynn Reist Neil Affleck	Alice Prodanou Robin Stein	March 16, 2005	115
Squirt meets a fly who is so tiny, the rest of his friends believe he has an imaginary friend. Shimmer wants to learn the bugpipes.
17	4	"The Bug Flu" "A Time Telling Tale"	Neil Affleck Lynn Reist	Robin Stein Steve Sullivan	March 17, 2005	118
Dragon fakes being sick so he can get out of going to Spindella's tea party, but soon realizes that he missed out on all the fun because of his so-called illness. Miss Spider builds a sundial in the village square to help her children tell time.
18	5	"Secret Frog"	Neil Affleck	Story by : Steven Sullivan; Teleplay by : Michael Stokes	June 20, 2005	999
The bugs meet a frog named Felix while playing in the Taddy Puddle.
19	6	"The Big Green Bug"	Neil Affleck	Story by : Steven Sullivan; Teleplay by : Alice Prodanou	July 21, 2005	999
Spiderus starts an anti-frog squad, which places the kids' new friend Felix in danger. To protect Felix, the kids disguise him as a bug.
20	7	"Captain Sunny Patch" "Captain Sunny Patch Flies Again"	Lynn Reist Neil Affleck	Michael Stokes	March 13, 2006	117
Squirt comes up with his own superhero persona.
21	8	"Family Tree" "The Jitterbug"	Neil Affleck Lynn Reist	Alice Prodanou	March 14, 2006 (Note: "Family Tree" was first released in Happy Heartwood Day DVD on January 10, 2006.)	119
The kids build a family tree for their school project. Shimmer and Miss Spider search for the place Shimmer hatched to try to find a special hatchday memento for it. Squirt falls off his web while trying a risky new surfer stunt and is too afraid to tell anyone that his death defying trick was actually a very scary accident.
22	9	"The Thinking Stone" "Big Bad Buggysitter"	Neil Affleck Lynn Reist	Michael Stokes Steven Sullivan	March 15, 2006 (Note: "The Thinking Stone" was first released in Happy Heartwood Day DVD on January 10, 2006.)	120
Squirt faces a tough decision, so he finds a quiet place to think. It is Miss Spider and Holley's wedding anniversary and Spindella babysits their children while they are out on a date.
23	10	"Seeing Straight" "Stumped!"	Neil Affleck Lynn Reist	Alice Prodanou Michael Stokes	March 16, 2006	201
Dragon finds a pair of glasses while flying around Sunny Patch and loses them. After Squirt and Shimmer fight over the last berry of the season, Miss Spider and Holley try to settle the argument in multiple ways.
24	11	"Eight Legs Up" "Spider Mom"	Neil Affleck Lynn Reist	Alice Prodanou Scott Kraft	March 20, 2006	202
Snowdrop becomes self-conscious of her 8 legs. The bugs train for a charity race in Sunny Patch.
25	12	"Best Bug Buddies" "Snuggle Bugs"	Lynn Reist Neil Affleck	Scott Kraft and Nadine van der Velde Nadine van der Velde	March 21, 2006 (Note: "Snuggle Bugs" was first released in Happy Heartwood Day DVD on January 10, 2006.)	203
When Spindella's niece Petal visits, Squirt and Wiggle try to impress her. The bugs try to sleep on a stormy night.
26	13	"Be Good to Bugs... and Frogs"	Neil Affleck	Steven Sullivan	June 27, 2006	999
It's Be Good to Bugs Day in Sunny Patch.

=== Season 3 (2006–2007) ===
No. overall	No. in season	Title	Directed by	Written by	Storyboard by	Original release date	Prod. code
27	1	"Fungus Among Us" "Ground Bound"	Lynn Reist Neil Affleck	Michael Stokes	Kathy Paulin-Lougheed	March 22, 2006	204
Wiggle secretly brings home a mushroom after being told not to. After the Taddy Puddle's lifeguard Barry is injured, he finds out that he cannot fly again.
28	2	"Pitch and Itch" "Bounce Back"	Lynn Reist Neil Affleck	Alice Prodanou Nadine van der Velde	Jun Nasayao Robert Clark	March 23, 2006	205
Ned and Ted find ivy leaves and trick the other bugs into buying them. The bugs are about to have fun until Squirt teases Bounce about his stuffed doll, and Bounce "loses his smile" as a result.
29	3	"Mr. Mocking-Bug" "Odd Bug Fellows"	Lynn Reist Neil Affleck	Steve Sullivan John van Bruggen	Arna Selznick Andrew Tan	September 10, 2006	212
Squirt finds out that he can imitate any voice. Spiderus and Spindella's home gets covered in mold.
30	4	"Giddy Up Bugs" "A Plushy Parable"	Lynn Reist Neil Affleck	Michael Stokes John van Bruggen	Alan Bunce Robert Clark	September 23, 2006; May 13, 2007 (Noggin Airing)	211
The bugs help Sawyer and her aphids roundup honeydew. Pansy borrows Miss Spider's old doll and then loses it.
31	5	"Lost and Sound" "It's My Party"	Lynn Reist Neil Affleck	Steve Sullivan Nadine van der Velde	Alan Bunce Robert Walton	October 6, 2006; May 14, 2007 (Noggin Airing)	206
Spinner struggles to remember a song he made up. The spider children cannot agree what to do for their hatchday party.
32	6	"Lulla-Bug" "The Most Perfect Parent"	Neil Affleck Lynn Reist	Steve Sullivan	Kathy Paulin-Lougheed Andrew Tan	October 6, 2006; May 15, 2007 (Noggin Airing)	207
Spiderus and Spindella have twin girls and a boy. Spiderus is left in charge of his three baby triplets while Spindella goes away to her sister’s wedding. However, his attempts to take care of them do not go well.
33	7	"Dam the Puddle" "Flower Power"	Neil Affleck Lynn Reist	Nadine van der Velde Michael Stokes	Robert Clark Luisito Escauriaga	September 9, 2006; May 16, 2007 (Noggin Airing)	208
Sunny Patch has been hit by a heat wave. Lil Sis and Princess Honey Bee get tired of being treated like babies.
34	8	"Frog in the Moon" "Moon Music and Sun Songs"	Lynn Reist Neil Affleck	Steve Sullivan John van Bruggen	Andrew Tan Jun Nasayao	September 16, 2006; May 17, 2007 (Noggin Airing)	210
Felix tries to hop all the way to the moon. A family of crickets have moved near the Hollow Tree.
35	9	"Snake Charmer" "A Party for Pops"	Lynn Reist Neil Affleck	Scott Kraft Steve Sullivan	Robert Clark Mike Smukavic	June 17, 2007	209
Spiderus shows how brave he is by bringing home a snake egg. The bugs throw a Thank you, Dad day party for their dad.
36	10	"Master Mantis" "Bug-Versity"	Neil Affleck Lynn Reist	Scott Kraft John van Bruggen	Robert Clark Jun Nasayao	October 30, 2006; August 5, 2007 (Noggin Airing)	215
When the kids get frightened on a school field trip, Mr. Mantis tells them a story. Wiggle and Bounce cannot decide what bugs to dress up as for a school project.
37	11	"Spring Unsprung" "Bumbling Bees"	Lynn Reist Neil Affleck	Nadine van der Velde John van Bruggen	Jun Nasayao Andrew Tan	April 14, 2007; April 13, 2008 (Noggin Airing)	213
Squirt plans to wake up Felix the frog on the first day of spring. Dragon wants to work with bees in the hive.
38	12	"Good Deed Seeds" "Shelley and the Brain"	Neil Affleck Lynn Reist	John van Bruggen Steve Sullivan	Jun Nasayao Andrew Tan	October 8, 2006; April 13, 2008 (Noggin Airing)	218
Miss Spider comes up with "good deed seeds" to teach her kids about being generous to others. Shelley plays with the Spider children.
39	13	"Night and Day" "Cob Fog"	Neil Affleck Lynn Reist	Steve Sullivan	Robert Clark Andrew Tan	October 22, 2006; July 13, 2008 (Noggin Airing)	220
Grace sleeps over at the Hollow Tree. Dragon and the Flying Aces get lost after a thick fog in the sky prevents them from seeing.
40	14	"Bringing Up Shrubby" "Stuck on You"	Neil Affleck Lynn Reist	Scott Kraft John van Bruggen	Andrew Tan Arna Selznick	September 24, 2006; October 26, 2008 (Noggin Airing)	216
The bugs find a squished plant. After Spinner and Dragon get stuck in maple syrup, they must work together with their differences.
41	15	"Bug Talk" "The Befuddled Butterfly"	Lynn Reist Neil Affleck	Steve Sullivan John van Bruggen	Robert Clark Alan Bunce	October 1, 2006; December 14, 2008 (Noggin Airing)	217
The kids learn about different bug languages in school. The kids' adoptive sister Cookie returns to Sunny Patch and finds out she lost her butterfly instincts.
42	16	"Little Ladybug Lost" "A Beetle-ful Family"	Neil Affleck Lynn Reist	Scott Kraft	Arna Selznick Kathy Paulin-Lougheed	October 15, 2006; December 15, 2008 (Noggin Airing)	219
The Spider family meets an orphaned ladybug named Grace. Stinky and his sister Whiffy adopt Grace after her family never comes back.
43	17	"Eclipse" "Hide and Sleuth"	Lynn Reist Neil Affleck	Scott Kraft John van Bruggen	Arna Selznick Alan Bunce	September 17, 2006; August 9, 2009 (Noggin Airing)	214
A solar eclipse is occurring in Sunny Patch. Squirt, Bounce, Stinky and Shelly play hide and seek. When Shelly goes off on a trail, the bugs help find him.

=== Special (2006) ===
Title	Directed by	Written by	Storyboard by	Original release date	Prod. code
"The Prince, the Princess and the Bee"	Merle Anne Ridley	Nadine van der Velde	Trevor Hierons and Tim O'Halloran	July 24, 2006	998
Shimmer flies to Mushroom Glen to discover whether or not she is the descendant of a royal jewel beetle (Limmer), who had gotten lost in a storm.
