= Tomboy (2008 film) =

- Genre: Animation Short, Narrative Fiction, 2D
- Created by: Barb Taylor
- Written by: Karleen Pendleton Jiménez
- Starring: Athena Karkanis; Alex Castillo; Michael D. Cohen; Sandi Ross; Julie Lemieux; Orville Maciel; Aaryn Doyle; Rebecca Brenner
- Country of origin: Canada
- Original languages: English & Spanish

Production
- Running time: approx. 14 minutes

Original release
- Network: CBC Television
- Release: 2009

Tomboy is an educational Canadian short animation film that debuted in 2009 on CBC. It is a 14-minute 2D animated video/movie that follows a day in the life of an elementary school Latina Canadian girl named Alex, as she maneuvers her way through the obstacles of being a gender neutral tomboy who wears unisex clothes and has short hair. This film explores issues of gender expression, bullying and diversity, bringing light to the issues that surround children, through the choices they make, and the emotional repercussions that follow. Tomboy is based on the book Are You a Boy or a Girl?, by author Karleen Pendleton Jiménez, which was a finalist for the 2001 Lambda Literary Awards.

== Production ==
Tomboy was developed by filmmaker Barb Taylor and Karleen Pendleton Jiménez in association with Coyle Productions. On its initial debut after being completed Tomboy was the recipient of the CBC Canadian Reflections Award (2006), Jury Award & Audience Award, Short Animation, Reeling Festival (2008), Best of Festival, Austin Women's Film and Literary Festival (2008), Jury Award Up and Coming Toronto Film Maker, Inside Out Festival (2008), KIDS FIRST! Best Award! (2009), Best Animation, Urban Mediamakers Film Festival (2009), Jury Award Animation, Orlando Hispanic Film Festival (2009), Best Web Animation, Savannah Animation Festival (2010).

== Characters and cast ==
- Alex (Athena Karkanis) is the tomboy girl who finds it difficult to be who she wants to be, when the other kids start making fun of her and calling her a boy, and questioning her femininity. Even though she tries to stand up for herself, Alex finds it hard to be different in a world where being the same is more readily accepted than being different.
- Mom (Alex Castillo) is Alex's caring and supportive mom who assures her it's ok to be herself. Mom comforts Alex by letting her know that history is filled with people who are picked on for being different, but in the end, it's not what others think that will make her special or successful, but what's important is that she's doing what makes her happy and is right for her.
- Postman (Michael D. Cohen) is the whistling mailman who mistakes Alex for a boy, after complimenting her on her excellent whistling... Oops!
- Teacher (Sandi Ross) is the well informed politically correct teacher who teaches her class how to deal with each other's fairly and without discriminating.
- Berto (Julie Lemieux) is the outspoken boy who believes that girls should be girls and that Alex is as confused as he is about whether she is a girl or a boy. But most importantly, he believes that if Alex is a girl, she should not be playing soccer with the boys at recess.
- Kareem (Orville Maciel) is the well-intentioned boy who doesn't know what side to take in the identity crisis dilemma that his friend Alex seems to be having at school. And even though he is uncomfortable with Alex being picked on, he doesn't know what to think or do. So when asked for his advice by Alex he gives her the best advice he can, which doesn't help at all.
- Katy (Aaryn Doyle) is the princess that Alex talks about rescuing when the movie opens, but in the end princess Katy comes to Alex's rescue in the school playground, explaining to the very opinionated Dionne; that there is nothing wrong with Alex's short hair. In fact, it's OK if Alex likes to play sports with the boys, or chooses to wear clothes that don't look girly.
- Dionne (Rebecca Brenner) is the redhead, doll-toting girly girl who's somewhat of a bully at school. Dionne likes to stir things up with her opinions and complains constantly about how un-girly Alex is and that she needs to change her ways if she is to ever fit in.

== See also ==
- List of LGBT films directed by women
