= List of Rolie Polie Olie episodes =

This is a list of episodes from Rolie Polie Olie, a children's animated series aimed at young children.

== Series overview ==
Season	Episodes	Originally released	
Season	Episodes	First released	Last released
1	13	October 4, 1998	December 30, 1998
2	13	June 8, 1999	November 27, 1999
3	13	January 11, 2000	March 1, 2001
4	13	July 4, 2001	October 25, 2001
5	13	December 11, 2001	June 14, 2002
6	13	September 21, 2002	April 28, 2004
Films	2	August 13, 2002	June 3, 2003

== Episodes ==
=== Season 1 (1998) ===
No. overall	No. in season	Title	Written by	Original release date
1	1	"Little Sister, Big Bother"	Peter Sauder	October 4, 1998
1	1	"Through Trick and Thin"	Peter Sauder	October 4, 1998
1	1	"Bedlam"	Peter Sauder	October 4, 1998
Zowie starts to act crazy and Olie must figure out why after he oversleeps for school; Olie tries to teach Spot some tricks while playing space heroes; Olie and Zowie get ready for bed.
2	2	"Ciminin Toast"	Betty Quan	October 11, 1998
2	2	"I Find Rock"	Betty Quan	October 11, 1998
2	2	"Tooth on the Loose"	Ian James Corlett	October 11, 1998
Olie and Zowie try to make a surprise breakfast-in-bed (Breakfast Soup Surprise and Ciminin Toast) for Polina and Percy but it ends up being a horrible mess due to the ingredients used; Zowie finds a rock which she considers her 'pet'; Olie loses a tooth and he and Spot try to catch Pappy's dentures. Note: "Tooth on the Loose" was released on the VHS of the same name in February 2002.
3	3	"Nap for Spot"	Betty Quan	October 18, 1998
3	3	"Monster Movie Night"	Ben Joseph	October 18, 1998
3	3	"Top Dog Fish"	Peter Sauder	October 18, 1998
Spot's tired and he must find a place to sleep in peace while his doggy bed is in the wash; Olie's friend Billy stays at the Polies for the late-night TV Monster Movie Marathon; When the Polies look after a fish from Olie's school, Spot becomes jealous. Note: "Top Dog Fish" was released on the "Happy Hearts Day" VHS and the "Springy-Time Fun" DVD. Also, the second episode has us introduced to Billy Bevel for the first time.
4	4	"The House Detectives"	Ben Joseph	October 25, 1998
4	4	"The Backyard Jungle"	Betty Quan	October 25, 1998
4	4	"The Best Doggone Show in the World"	Peter Sauder	October 25, 1998
Olie and Zowie must find Percy's keys; Olie grows a giant tomato plant; Telly the Television feels overwatched and the Polies can't watch their favorite show, so Olie and Zowie recreate it. Note: "The Best Doggone Show in the World" was released on the "Meet Rolie Polie Olie" VHS in August 2000.
5	5	"Mutiny on the Bouncy"	Ben Joseph	November 1, 1998
5	5	"Roll the Camera"	Story by : Ian James Corlett; Written by : Peter Sauder	November 1, 1998
5	5	"Pappy's Boat"	Nicola Barton	November 1, 1998
Olie and Billy pretend to be pirates; Olie records a video about his family; Olie, Zowie, and Pappy pretend to go fishing on his houseboat in the garden. Note: "Mutiny on the Bouncy" was released on the "Franklin's Valentines DVD" and "Roll the Camera" was released on the "Meet Rolie Polie Olie" VHS in August 2000, and "Pappy's Boat" was released on the "Franklin the Detective" DVD.
6	6	"Where's Pappy?"	Ben Joseph	November 8, 1998
6	6	"Hopin' and a Hoppin'"	Betty Quan	November 8, 1998
6	6	"Just Like Dad"	Peter Sauder	November 8, 1998
Pappy cannot find his way out of the closet after attempting a magic trick; Olie tries to hop on one foot; Olie acts like his dad and does one of his jobs.
7	7	"Spot's Birthday"	Bonnie Chung	November 15, 1998
7	7	"Sir Rolie Polie Oily"	Betty Quan	November 15, 1998
7	7	"Universal Spot"	Ben Joseph	November 15, 1998
It is Spot's birthday and the Polies look back at when Spot was first adopted back in the day when even Zowie was a baby; Olie pretends to be a knight; Percy makes a remote which can control all of the living furniture and appliances by the single click of a button, so they work together to throw it out when left unattended.
8	8	"Squaresville"	Betty Quan	November 22, 1998
8	8	"Zowie's Harmonica"	Story by : Bonnie Chung; Written by : Peter Sauder	November 22, 1998
8	8	"Unruly Polie Olie"	Peter Sauder	November 22, 1998
Olie devises a square world for him and Billy to play in; Zowie has a harmonica and when she loses it, the living furniture offer to get it back for her despite all the horrible noise she was making; Olie and Billy learn that life without rules isn't always a good thing. Note: Squaresville was released as the first segment of the "Round Pal, Square Friend" VHS tape.
9	9	"Rolie Polie Pogo"	Bonnie Chung	November 29, 1998
9	9	"Two Not So Easy Pieces"	Bruce Robb	November 29, 1998
9	9	"Gotta Dance"	Bonnie Chung	November 29, 1998
Olie's new pogo stick causes trouble; Confusion arises over who broke Pappy's model boat; Zowie grows jealous of Olie and Billy's victory dances.
10	10	"Pappy Days"	Bonnie Chung	December 6, 1998
10	10	"Copy Cat N' Mouse"	Erika Strobel	December 6, 1998
10	10	"The Bump"	Peter Sauder	December 6, 1998
During a thunderstorm in Polieville, Pappy helps soothe the fears of the kids by keeping them entertained; Olie tries to get Zowie to copycat herself upstairs for a nap; A mysterious sound is heard while the Polies are trying to sleep. Note: "The Bump" was released on "Franklin and the Gloomy Day" DVD.
11	11	"Zowie Got Game"	John van Bruggen	December 13, 1998
11	11	"Hickety Ups"	Story by : Anna Rehak; Written by : Betty Quan	December 13, 1998
11	11	"Chili's Cold"	Story by : Bonnie Chung; Written by : Betty Quan	December 13, 1998
Zowie tries to play a made-up game that Olie and Billy created; Olie gets the hiccups; Chili the Refrigerator gets sick with a cold, so the Polies do the 'chili-chili-cha-cha' to make it feel better.
12	12	"Our Two Dads"	Bonnie Chung	December 20, 1998
12	12	"What to Be"	John van Bruggen	December 20, 1998
12	12	"Magno-Men"	Ben Joseph	December 20, 1998
Olie's dad decides to act like Uncle Gizmo while he is over at the Polies' for the first time; Olie tries to decide what to be besides a space ranger; Olie gets attached to metallic objects by a new machine that Percy invented named Magnotron.
13	13	"Scavenger Hunt"	Ben Joseph and Bonnie Chung	December 30, 1998
13	13	"What's Up Jack?"	Peter Sauder	December 30, 1998
13	13	"Grown Ups and Kids"	Ben Joseph	December 30, 1998
A scavenger hunt takes place in the backyard; Olie pretends to rescue Zowie's toy dragons from a jack-in-the-box, who plays the role of the bad guy; Olie, Billy and Zowie imagine themselves as the adults and the Polie parents as the kids. Note: "Grown Ups and Kids" was released on the "Growing Upsy Daisy" VHS on February 19, 2002 and also has the song 'totally chocolate dinner'.

=== Season 2 (1999) ===
No. overall	No. in season	Title	Written by	Storyboard by	Original release date
14	1	"Mom's Night Out"	Nadine van der Velde	Lance Taylor	June 8, 1999
14	1	"Polie Pox"	Ben Joseph	Andrew Tan	June 8, 1999
14	1	"Da Plane! Da Plane!"	Ben Joseph	Andrew Tan	June 8, 1999
Mrs. Polie goes out for the night to go bowling; Zowie feels lonely about not being able to play with her brother Olie when he catches the Polie Pox (their equivalent to chickenpox); Olie, Pappy, Billy and Zowie race planes. Note: "Mom's Night Out" was released as the last segment on the "Happy Hearts Day" VHS tape on January 9, 2001 and the "Springy-Time Fun" DVD on January 6, 2004, and the "Franklin and the Robot" DVD.
15	2	"Surrrprise!"	Bonnie Chung	Andrew Tan	September 11, 1999
15	2	"Mousetrap"	Story by : Frank Young; Written by : Bonnie Chung	Lance Taylor	September 11, 1999
15	2	"To Space and Beyond"	Ben Joseph	Lance Taylor	September 11, 1999
The Polie family prepares a surprise birthday party for Olie; Clocky's mouse (Mousey) escapes; Pappy, Billy, Olie and Zowie pretend to be in space.
16	3	"Go Fish"	Nadine Van der Velde & Scott Kraft	Andrew Tan	September 26, 1999
16	3	"Roller Derby"	Ben Joseph	Lance Taylor	September 26, 1999
16	3	"A Birthday Present for Mom"	Nadine van der Velde	Lance Taylor	September 26, 1999
The fish from Olie's school revisits the Polie family home, and it has babies; Olie roller-skates everywhere when he should be doing his homework and eventually he learns the activity is quite hazardous; It's Polina's Birthday and Olie doesn't have enough money to buy her a present, so he and Zowie try opening a lemonade stand. Note: The first segment of this episode reveals that the school fish turns out to be female.
17	4	"A Little Souped Coup-y"	Scott Kraft & Nadine van der Velde	Lance Taylor	September 30, 1999
17	4	"Rain Rain Go Away"	Ben Joseph	Christophe Villez	September 30, 1999
17	4	"Beach Blanket Gizmo"	Scott Kraft	Christophe Villez	September 30, 1999
Olie's family try to get themselves and Coupey the Car ready for a parade; The rain inspires Olie to stay in the house and dance for the sun to come out; When Olie cannot go to the beach, Uncle Gizmo throws a beach party for him.
18	5	"Y2 Pappy"	Scott Kraft	Richard Poulin	October 6, 1999
18	5	"Upside Downers"	Dave Dias	Andrew Tan	October 6, 1999
18	5	"Cutie Go Bye-Bye"	Carol Commisso	Steve Remen	October 6, 1999
One of Pappy's gears gets bent which causes his Speed-o-lator to go haywire; When Magnotron turns everyone upside down the Polies must find a way to get right-side-up; Zowie's doll, Cutie, goes missing and Olie must find her.
19	6	"Olie's Note"	Nicola Barton	Lance Taylor	October 9, 1999
19	6	"Baby Binky"	Erika Strobel	Andrew Tan	October 9, 1999
19	6	"A Record Bustin' Day"	Ben Joseph	Christophe Villez	October 9, 1999
Olie brings home a note, and tries to be good, thinking the note says something about a bad thing he did, but it later turns out to be an invitation to a fair; Billy introduces his baby brother named Binky; Olie tries to set himself a special record for Polieville.
20	7	"Where O Where Did Olie Go?"	Scott Kraft	Francois Bruel	October 16, 1999
20	7	"Gone Dog-Gone Dog"	Scott Kraft	Lance Taylor	October 16, 1999
20	7	"A Chip Off the Old Orb"	Scott Kraft	David Thrasher	October 16, 1999
Olie shrinks and must find his way to get to his normal size; Spot accidentally grows into a giant and escapes to catch cars and planes around Polieville and must get back to his normal size; Olie and his dad accidentally shrink and must find a way to get big again. Note: These episodes all seem to involve growing and shrinking from the effects of Magnotron.
21	8	"The Legend of Spookie Ookie"	Laura Kosterski	David Thrasher	October 23, 1999
21	8	"Oooh Scary!"	Ben Joseph	Andrew Tan	October 23, 1999
21	8	"Zowie Queen of the Pumpkins"	Nicola Barton	Andrew Tan	October 23, 1999
It's Spookie Ookie Day (the Polie equivalent of Halloween) and Pappy tricks Zowie and Olie by appearing as Spookie Ookie himself; Olie and his friends build a scare zone for his friends; Zowie and (presumably the real) Spookie Ookie must find their way into his house. Note: This episode was released on the "Spookie Ookie Halloween" VHS in August 2001.
22	9	"Looove Bug"	Nicola Barton	Andrew Tan	November 2, 1999
22	9	"Seven Minutes and Counting"	Ken Ross	Christophe Villez	November 2, 1999
22	9	"Olie's New Suit"	Nicola Barton	Francois Bruel	November 2, 1999
Pollie Pi moves into Polieville, meets Olie and Billy, and they immediately fall in love with her because they were shot by the cupid-like love bug; Olie counts down seven minutes as he tries to get ready for a baseball game; Olie has to wear a new suit, but he doesn't like the way it looks because he's afraid his guests, Billy and Pollie, will laugh at him. Note: "Looove Bug" was released on the "Happy Hearts Day" VHS and the "Springy-Time Fun" DVD.
23	10	"Mission Invisible"	Scott Kraft	David Thrasher	November 6, 1999
23	10	"Muscle Bots"	Ben Joseph	Christophe Villez	November 6, 1999
23	10	"Hypno-Eyes"	Ken Ross	Francois Bruel	November 6, 1999
Olie becomes invisible when his mom calls him as he and Billy are on a secret spy mission; While Percy and Polina are jogging, Olie teaches Billy and Zowie to become Muscle-Bots; Olie gets hypno glasses and tries to hypnotize Billy into acting like a chicken, but it backfires and happens to Spot instead.
24	11	"Starry Starry Night"	Nicola Barton	Francois Bruel	November 13, 1999
24	11	"Snowie"	Nicola Barton	Tom Nesbitt	November 13, 1999
24	11	"Jingle Jangle Day's Eve"	Nadine van der Velde & Scott Kraft	Lance Taylor	November 13, 1999
When Zowie breaks Pappy's star named Starry, Klanky must fix it; Olie plays in the snow with his snowman decoration friend; Percy reads a rendition of The Night Before Christmas. Note: This episode was released as bonus episodes on the "Olie's Winter Wonderland" DVD and the "Rolie Polie Christmas" VHS.
25	12	"Little Bot Zoo"	Laura Kosterski	David Thrasher	November 23, 1999
25	12	"Zowie's Soupy Hero"	Story by : Carol Commisso; Written by : Scott Kraft	Christophe Villez	November 23, 1999
25	12	"Coupy Won't Fit"	Ken Ross	Tom Nesbitt	November 23, 1999
Zowie and Binky pretend to be animals at a zoo as Percy is trying to tire them out for a nap; Zowie wants to become a superhero; Since Coupy the Car can't fit in the garage, the Polies decide to get rid of the old junk in it by having a garage sale. Note: In "Little Bot Zoo", Olie is absent.
26	13	"Zowie Do, Olie Too"	Nicola Barton	Francois Bruel	November 27, 1999
26	13	"Dicey Situation"	Laura Kosterski	Andrew Tan	November 27, 1999
26	13	"Square Plane in a Round Hole"	Scott Kraft	Tom Nesbitt	November 27, 1999
Zowie finds some stuff to do after being encouraged by Olie and Billy; Dicey, the Bevels' cat, comes over to visit her neighbours for the first time; Olie borrows Billy's plane and promises to be careful with it, only to accidentally break it when he tries flying it through a window.

=== Season 3 (2000–01) ===
No. overall	No. in season	Title	Written by	Storyboard by	Original release date
28	1	"Home Sick"	Scott Kraft	Tom Nesbitt	August 30, 2000
28	1	"Leaf Me Alone"	Ken Ross	Andrew Tan	August 30, 2000
28	1	"Round and Round and Square We Go"	Melissa Clark	Christophe Villez	August 30, 2000
Housey comes down with a cold, and the Polies try to make it feel better, but it turns out Dicey was stuck in its chimney in the end; Zowie and Binky chase a leaf all over the backyard, wrecking each card house that Olie and Billy make; The Bevels and the Polies have a backyard barbecue. Note: The 3rd episode is the first time we meet Billy's parents, Baxter and Bonita.
27	2	"Gotcha!"	Michael Stokes	Francois Bruel	January 11, 2000
27	2	"Springy Chicken"	Erika Strobel	Frank Lintzen	January 11, 2000
27	2	"A Polie Egg-Stravaganza"	Erica Strobel	Andrew Tan	January 11, 2000
Olie and Billy chase after Pappy's runaway dentures; The Polies prepare themselves for the arrival of the Springy Chicken; Springy Chicken's baby hatches early and the Polies try everything they can to keep the chick in the nest. Note: The latter two episodes were released on the "Easter Egg-Stravaganza" VHS and the "Springy Time Fun" DVD.
29	3	"Throw It in Gear"	Ben Joseph	Jean-Noël Malinge	September 11, 2000
29	3	"A Tooth for a Tooth"	Nicola Barton	Francois Bruel	September 11, 2000
29	3	"Polie Collectables"	Story by : Jennifer Pertsch; Written by : Michael Stokes	Andrew Tan	September 11, 2000
Olie puts things into gear with Billy and Uncle Gizmo; Olie loses a tooth, and tapes the Tooth Fairy's arrival with Billy; Olie's family look at their collectables. Note: This is the second episode to have a segment in which Olie loses a tooth, the first being episode 2 of the first season, that segment being "Tooth on the Loose".
30	4	"Doggy Day Afternoon"	Melissa Clark	Francois Bruel	September 20, 2000
30	4	"Visibly Invisible"	Melissa Clark	Tom Nesbitt	September 20, 2000
30	4	"Itty Bitty Baby Starry"	Melissa Clark	Andrew Tan	September 20, 2000
Spot has a great day when Olie, Zowie, Percy and Gizmo all pretend to be dogs; Olie becomes invisible and helps Billy clear away his toys; When a baby star crash lands on Planet Polie, the Polies must attempt a way to bring him back to his parents and back into space. Note: "Itty Bitty Baby Starry" was released on the "Jingle Jangle Holiday" VHS and the "Olie's Winter Wonderland" DVD.
31	5	"Baby Talk"	Dave Dias	Francois Bruel	September 28, 2000
31	5	"Putting on the Dog"	Ben Joseph	Tom Nesbitt	September 28, 2000
31	5	"Whistlin' Zowie"	Nicola Barton	Andrew Tan	September 28, 2000
Olie and Billy try to teach Binky some new words; Spot has to get clean for a date with Fifi, Pollie Pi's dog; Zowie tries to whistle.
32	6	"Square Roots"	Scott Kraft and Nadine van der Velde	Lance Taylor	October 21, 2000
32	6	"1 Olie, 2 Olie, 3 Olie, 4"	Melissa Clark	Christophe Villez	October 21, 2000
32	6	"Switcheroo"	Michael Stokes	Francois Bruel	October 21, 2000
Olie makes a video of the Bevels' life as a family; Olie clones himself in an attempt to get to have fun and have his homework done at once; Olie and Billy switch their shapes to see what both their different lives are like for one another. Note: "Switcheroo" was released on the "Round Pal Square Friend" VHS in May 28, 2002.
33	7	"Cool It!"	Scott Kraft	Frank Lintzen	March 1, 2001
33	7	"Polie Pests"	Melissa Clark	Tom Nesbitt	March 1, 2001
33	7	"Camp Out"	Kim Thompson	Frank Lintzen	March 1, 2001
On a hot day, Percy turns the backyard into a skating rink for Olie and Billy; Olie and Pollie learn about caterpillars; Olie and Pollie camp out in the backyard. Note: "Cool It!" was released on the "Jingle Jangle Holiday" VHS and the "Olie's Winter Wonderland" DVD.
34	8	"Rewind"	Michael Stokes	Lance Taylor	February 15, 2001
34	8	"Who's the Bestest of Them All"	Nicola Barton	Christophe Pittet	February 15, 2001
34	8	"But Why?"	Scott Kraft	Andrew Tan	February 15, 2001
Percy makes a Rewind-a-lator, which causes everything to go backwards; Olie wants to know who is the best out of him and Billy; Zowie keeps asking "why?" at everything and anything.
35	9	"Giz-nesia"	Scott Kraft	Francois Bruel	November 7, 2000
35	9	"1001 Gearabian Nights"	Melissa Clark	Frank Lintzen	November 7, 2000
35	9	"Showdown at the Ol' Polie Corral"	Melissa Clark	Francois Bruel	November 7, 2000
Gizmo comes over to visit but all Olie and Zowie want to do is watch a movie, and while trying to get their attention, he develops amnesia; Billy and Olie must read a book for school, but thanks to a mishap with Percy's redecorator, they begin floating on their own magic carpet as they read; Zowie wants to watch a cowboy movie, but Olie wants to watch Space Boy, so they flip a coin in order to determine who will get control over Telly.
36	10	"Let's Make History"	Michael Stokes	Christophe Villez	December 24, 2000
36	10	"Adventures of Space Dads"	Erika Strobel	Lionel Allaix	December 24, 2000
36	10	"Silly Willy Day"	Erika Strobel	Andrew Tan	December 24, 2000
The kids put on a play about the history of planet Polie; When Olie and Billy start arguing over a game of tag, their fathers step in and show them how to play without arguing; As the comet Sillious heads towards Polieville, color returns to the gray lives of the Polies, but they start to act crazy due to silliness: Olie walks on his hands, Zowie wears glasses, Percy sings nonstop while on rollerskates, and Polina bounces on a pogo stick. Note: "Silly Willy Day" marks the first time fireworks appear in CGI. Like the actual fireworks on some shows and films, the fireworks in this episode get shot from stars rather than on the ground like an actual fireworks display would do on Independence Day, New Year's Eve or Bonfire Night.
37	11	"Detective Polie's Cookie Caper"	Story by : Erika Strobel; Written by : Scott Kraft	Tom Nesbitt	February 1, 2001
37	11	"The Lie"	Michael Stokes	Christophe Pittet	February 1, 2001
37	11	"Guess It's Nite Nite"	Nicola Barton	Lionel Allaix	February 1, 2001
Olie tries to do some detective work on who stole the cookies that Polina made; Olie tells a lie when he doesn't want to eat his Brussels sprouts which causes him to have a dream where they grow bigger every time; It's lights out for Housey, and Olie and Zowie make it hard for Pappy to get them in bed. Note: "The Lie" was released on the "Telling the Truth" VHS in May 28, 2002.
38	12	"When Zowie All Growed Up"	Scott Kraft	Andrew Tan	February 8, 2001
38	12	"Scruba-dub-dubby-A Spot in the Tubby"	Ben Joseph	Frank Lintzen	February 8, 2001
38	12	"Hide And Go Sleep"	Dave Dias	Lance Taylor	February 8, 2001
Zowie is feeling down about being too little to do the things that Olie can do, so Gizmo tells her about the time when Percy was feeling the same way; Olie tries to give Spot a bath when he doesn't want one; Zowie, Binky and Olie play hide and seek.
39	13	"Just Putting Around"	Melissa Clark	Christophe Pittet	February 22, 2001
39	13	"Soupy Zowie and the Bogey Bot"	Story by : Scott Kraft; Written by : Dave Dias	Francois Bruel	February 22, 2001
39	13	"No Hugs Please"	Nicola Barton	Andrew Tan	February 22, 2001
Olie's dad plays golf; Zowie attempts to be a superhero after believing there's a monstrous robot under her bed; Olie doesn't want any hugs after Billy tells him he's too old to have any.

=== Season 4 (2001) ===
No. overall	No. in season	Title	Written by	Storyboard by	Original release date
40	1	"Family Portrait"	Ken Ross	Christophe Villez	June 11, 2001
40	1	"Show and Tell"	Melissa Clark	Tom Nesbitt	June 11, 2001
40	1	"Little Helping Hand"	Scott Kraft	Andrew Tan	June 11, 2001
Polina wants the family to wear blue for picture day; Olie looks for something to bring to show and tell; Percy helps Big Gene and Little Gene repair their spaceship.
41	2	"Pretend Friend"	Ben Joseph	Lance Taylor	July 4, 2001
41	2	"Beddy Day for Daddy"	Dave Dias	Lionel Allaix	July 4, 2001
41	2	"Chunk Squarey"	Scott Kraft	Frank Lintzen	July 4, 2001
Zowie has fun with an imaginary friend who may not be as imaginary as she thinks, as it is just Olie who turned invisible through Magnotron; Percy Polie comes down with a cold and Zowie is told to make sure he stays in bed until he gets better; Polieville is caught up in "The Twirl", which is a song and dance performed by Chunk Squarey, who is from Cubey. Note: The 2nd episode is the 2nd time overall where Olie doesn't appear.
42	3	"We Scream for Ice Cream"	Melissa Clark	Tom Nesbitt	July 17, 2001
42	3	"Pomps Up"	Hugh Duffy	Andrew Tan	July 17, 2001
42	3	"Anchors Away"	Nicola Barton	Francois Bruel	July 17, 2001
Olie, Zowie and Percy go to a planet made of ice cream; The boys help make Gizmo's pomp stand upright when it somehow flops in front of his face; Olie and Zowie help their parents celebrate their wedding anniversary. Note: "We Scream for Ice Cream" was released on the "Jingle Jangle Holiday" VHS and the "Olie's Winter Wonderland" DVD.
43	4	"Guys and Dollies"	Nicola Barton	Tom Nesbitt	July 31, 2001
43	4	"Dinglie Danglie Doodle"	Scott Kraft	Francois Bruel	July 31, 2001
43	4	"Dancin' Machines"	Dave Dias	Frank Lintzen	July 31, 2001
Olie finds out why girls play with dolls; Zowie learns a Polie Swear word and must find a way to stop saying it all the time; Uncle Gizmo teaches Olie and Zowie how to dance.
44	5	"Bubble Trouble"	Hugh Duffy	Lionel Allaix	August 14, 2001
44	5	"Calling All Space Boys"	Ben Joseph	Christophe Villez	August 14, 2001
44	5	"Binky Break"	Dave Dias	Francois Bruel	August 14, 2001
Olie and Zowie float all the way up into space with a bubble and they can't find their way home; Olie finds out Space Boy is real when he has to call him to save a planet; Zowie babysits Binky and tries everything she can to stop him from breaking everything, with Olie being absent throughout the episode.
45	6	"Who's the Worstest"	Jennifer Pertsch	Lance Taylor	August 26, 2001
45	6	"Puzzle Peace"	Hugh Duffy	Alan Bunce	August 26, 2001
45	6	"Robo Rangers"	Ken Ross	Andrew Tan	August 26, 2001
After Billy loses a game of boinky ball, Olie decides to play other games with him, by losing on purpose to make him feel better; Olie tries to find a runaway puzzle piece; Olie and Billy are Robo Rangers and go through all the tips when scouting.
46	7	"Rust in Space"	Ben Joseph	Lionel Allaix	August 28, 2001
46	7	"All Wound Up"	Melissa Clark	Frank Lintzen	August 28, 2001
46	7	"Soap-bot Derby"	Dave Dias	Andrew Tan	August 28, 2001
Olie leaves his toys outside when it rains, and he and Space Boy have to defeat a rust monster; Polina is feeling all wound up; Olie and Billy race against Zowie and Pollie.
47	8	"Treasure of the Rolie Polie Madre"	Ken Ross	Tom Nesbitt	August 30, 2001
47	8	"Lost and Found"	Nicola Barton	Francois Bruel	August 30, 2001
47	8	"Zowie's Petals"	Hugh Duffy	Christophe Villez	August 30, 2001
When Zowie accidentally takes Olie and Billy's treasure, she does not tell them, causing the boys to suspect each other of taking it; Olie loses a toy his dad gives him; Zowie finds a flower that she tries to nurse back to health.
48	9	"Day for Night"	Melissa Clark	Lance Taylor	September 4, 2001
48	9	"Zowie Cycle"	Bridget Newson	Tom Nesbitt	September 4, 2001
48	9	"Mighty Olie"	Ben Joseph	Lance Taylor	September 4, 2001
A solar eclipse in Polieville is happening, making the sun go black, so Pappy, Olie and Zowie do lots of fun night-time activities; Zowie wants to ride a bicycle; Olie listens to an inspirational story about Uncle Gizmo winning a Winky-Ball game from Pappy.
49	10	"Space Telly!"	Jennifer Pertsch	Andrew Tan	September 11, 2001
49	10	"Ultra Good Space Heroes"	Dave Dias	Francois Bruel	September 11, 2001
49	10	"It's a Roundi-ful Life"	Nicola Barton	Martial Harivel	September 11, 2001
The kids are ready to watch and play Space Boy, but Telly feels left out of the fun and tries to throw itself out with the trash; Olie and Pollie become real space heroes after being zapped by Magnotron; After Olie runs away and thinks nobody wants him around anymore, Percy, Zowie and Polina must find a way to bring him back. Note: These episodes aired just hours after 9/11.
50	11	"Cheery Spherey Day"	Dave Dias	Frank Lintzen	September 17, 2001
50	11	"Diary Daze"	Bridget Newson	Tom Nesbitt	September 17, 2001
50	11	"Rock-a-Bye Billy"	Nicola Barton	Andrew Tan	September 17, 2001
The Polies invite the Bevels over to celebrate a holiday that reminds them that all shapes are important; Olie has to write down his weekend activities in a diary for a school project, but when he spends all his time thinking up fun activities to put into his diary, he misses out on the real weekend fun; It's the annual Polie and Bevel talent show but Billy can't think of any talents that he has. Olie, however, overhears Billy singing a lullaby to Binky, and points out something he has been taking for granted, that he can sing Binky to sleep.
51	12	"Housey Wake Up!"	Scott Kraft	Lionel Allaix	September 28, 2001
51	12	"Blue Coupey"	Dave Dias	Lance Taylor	September 28, 2001
51	12	"Yesthankyouplease"	Jennifer Pertsch	Francois Bruel	September 28, 2001
Housey is overworked and refuses to wake up, so the Polies end up having a rest day; Coupey the Car is jealous over the attention Percy is giving to Motorboy when Gizmo brings him for a tune-up; Gizmo disguises himself to teach Zowie a few lessons in etiquette. Note: The second episode is the first time we meet the character of Wheelie.
52	13	"Wheelie"	Scott Kraft	Alan Bunce	October 18, 2001
52	13	"Clippy Clop"	Nicola Barton	Andrew Tan	October 18, 2001
52	13	"Doofy Looking Olie"	Dave Dias	Tom Nesbitt	October 18, 2001
Olie, Billy and Zowie meet a new friend named Wheelie who has a wheel instead of legs. when asked about it, he says that he was born this way; Pappy's horse Clippy Clop has lost her confidence and Olie and Zowie try to help her regain it; Convinced by a television commercial that he looks doofy, Olie orders a spiffer-upper kit to improve his looks, but as soon as he gets it and starts doing so right away, his parents decide to improve their looks, too and Zowie, who didn't even use the spiffer-upper, thinks they look funnier than before. Note: The first segment was released on the "Round Pal Square Friend" VHS in May 28, 2002.

=== Season 5 (2001–02) ===
No. overall	No. in season	Title	Written by	Storyboard by	Original release date
53	1	"Song of the Blue Fish"	Erika Strobel	Lance Taylor	October 25, 2001
53	1	"Lady Bug Lady Bug Fly Away Home"	Story by : Scott Kraft; Written by : Jennifer Pertsch	Frank Lintzen	October 25, 2001
53	1	"Bevel Beddie Bye"	Hugh Duffy	Andrew Tan	October 25, 2001
Olie wants to hear the blue fish's song under the songfish tree while visiting Pappy's farm; Olie tries to get a ladybug to leave the house; Olie sleeps over at the Bevels' house and sees its interior for the first time.
54	2	"A Little Hero"	Ben Joseph	Martial Harivel	December 11, 2001
54	2	"Binky's Birthday"	Bridget Newson	Lionel Allaix	December 11, 2001
54	2	"Hiding in Plain Sight"	Scott Kraft	Tom Nesbitt	December 11, 2001
Olie and Billy summon Space Boy and Space Dog because they forgot to say goodbye when they saw them depart on TV, only to learn there is a hero in every one of them as he goes off to help others in other galaxies; It's Binky's birthday and Olie and Billy have to organize all the games and activities; Zowie hides from Olie by turning invisible.
55	3	"Making the Best of It"	Dave Dias	Francois Bruel	December 17, 2001
55	3	"Superest Bot of Them All"	Ken Ross	Christophe Villez	December 17, 2001
55	3	"Oh Olie, Olie It's a Wired World"	Ben Joseph	Andrew Tan	December 17, 2001
Big Gene Green and Junior invite Olie and his dad to their planet for a picnic; Olie, Billy, and Polly compete to be the superest bot of them all, each displaying their own individual powers; Olie's dad uses some kind of machine to try to turn on a broken light in the kitchen, only to mix things up and distort their very reality in the process.
56	4	"Forgive and Forget It"	Melissa Clark	Sebastien Mainette	December 19, 2001
56	4	"Spot That Hero"	Dave Dias	Sebastien Mainette	December 19, 2001
56	4	"A Jingle Jangle Wish"	Nicola Barton	Tom Nesbitt	December 19, 2001
Olie gets mad at Spot when he destroys his baseball, and soon learns to forgive him; Spot dreams of becoming a superhero after hearing about Fifi saving a little bot from a car; After Olie and Zowie visit Klanky Klaus, Zowie forgets to ask Klanky about her gift, so it's up to Olie to send Klanky the message.
57	5	"Dino Bots"	Bridget Newson	Frank Lintzen	December 21, 2001
57	5	"A Couple of Good Sports"	Ben Joseph	Lance Taylor	December 21, 2001
57	5	"Pappy's Pals"	Dave Dias	Alan Bunce	December 21, 2001
Olie and Polly search for dino bots with Pappy; Olie and Billy want both of their favourite teams to win at a polie sporting event; While Pappy is away, his animals stay at the Polies' house.
58	6	"Bots Will Be Boys"	Dave Dias	Tom Nesbitt	December 28, 2001
58	6	"Screwy"	Scott Kraft	Tom Nesbitt	December 28, 2001
58	6	"Good Princess Zowie"	Jennifer Pertsch	Andrew Tan	December 28, 2001
Percy and Gizmo compete against each other to see who can do repairs on Pappy's farm the fastest, and Olie teams up with the former and Zowie with the latter; Olie and Billy meet a new kid in school named Screwy who turns out to be a horrible bully; Olie, Zowie, Pollie, and Billy are playing the King of Everything game, and Zowie wants the King of Everything crown, but doesn't know how to get it.
59	7	"Madame Bot-erfly"	Hugh Duffy	Francois Bruel	February 11, 2002
59	7	"Boxing Day"	Erika Strobel	Alan Bunce	February 11, 2002
59	7	"It's Just Not Fair"	Nicola Barton	Lionel Allaix	February 11, 2002
A polka dotted butterfly leads Olie and Zowie to some lost treasures of their family's past on Pappy's farm; Olie and Pollie believe that Billy is moving; After being told that he cannot skate in the house, Billy decides that a lot of things are not fair and confesses them all in his room.
60	8	"Dare Ya!"	Dave Dias	Francois Bruel	February 14, 2002
60	8	"Roundbeard's Ghost"	Erika Strobel	Christophe Villez	February 14, 2002
60	8	"Screwy Day"	Jennifer Pertsch	Lance Taylor	February 14, 2002
Screwy is daring Olie and Billy to do things they are afraid to do; Olie searches for Roundbeard's ghost on Pappy's farm after hearing a ghost story about him around the campfire; Screwy is bullying Billy because he can't tumble, and Olie punches him really hard because of this.
61	9	"Tug-A-Wheelie"	Bridget Newson	Andrew Tan	February 26, 2002
61	9	"Always Chasing Rainbows"	Jennifer Pertsch	Tom Nesbitt	February 26, 2002
61	9	"Follow Yer Nose"	Scott Kraft	Sebastien Mainette	February 26, 2002
Wheelie tries to make Olie, Zowie, Billy and Pollie feel good, especially when it is shown he can't always come to the park; after a rainy day, Olie and Zowie find a rainbow, a Rolie Trolie and a pot of golden lugnuts; Olie loses his nose and chases it all around Polieville and Polieville Park. Note: "Always Chasing Rainbows" was released on the "Easter Egg-Stravaganza" VHS and the "Springy-Time Fun" DVD.
62	10	"Ten Foot Olie"	Dave Dias	Alan Bunce	March 14, 2002
62	10	"The Big Drip"	Ben Joseph	Frank Lintzen	March 14, 2002
62	10	"Invasion of the Ticklers!"	Nicola Barton	Andrew Tan	March 14, 2002
Olie grows to ten feet tall by elongating his limbs; An annoying drip is waking up the family and a small leak ends up flooding the house, turning it into an indoor pool; Ticklers (the littlegreens' pets) invade Planet Polie.
63	11	"Widget Watchers"	Melissa Clark	Sebastien Mainette	March 17, 2002
63	11	"Shippin' and Receivin'"	Dave Dias	Lionel Allaix	March 17, 2002
63	11	"The Bestest Field Trip of All"	Story by : Scott Kraft; Written by : Melissa Clark	Christophe Villez	March 17, 2002
Screwy's favorite constellation is going extinct, so Olie and the others convince everyone in Polieville to watch the Widget constellation; Not being able to finish their school project, Olie and Billy try to finish it in a different way; Everyone goes on a field trip to Pappy's farm and Screwy claims to be the best at everything.
64	12	"Blind as a Bot"	Jennifer Pertsch	Lionel Allaix	April 28, 2002
64	12	"Beauty and the Bot"	Bridget Newson	Francois Bruel	April 28, 2002
64	12	"Olie's Bot-ler"	Story by : Hugh Duffy; Written by : Dave Dias	Tom Nesbitt	April 28, 2002
Percy takes off his glasses to make himself look young again, only to be almost blind without them; Olie and Pollie get roles in a school play; Olie buys a robot to help him and his family clean up a mess.
65	13	"Chunk Sings the Blues"	Story by : Hugh Duffy; Written by : Dave Dias	Christophe Villez	June 14, 2002
65	13	"Cast Off"	Nicola Barton	Alan Bunce	June 14, 2002
65	13	"Orb's Well That Ends Well"	Bridget Newson	Andrew Tan	June 14, 2002
Chunk Squarey gets a bimple on his forehead and gets the idea that someone should fill in for him (that being Billy) until his bimple is healed; When Olie bends his antenna from a failed stunt, he gets a cast from the doctor until it heals; It's the last day of school and everyone is excited to be on Summer Break, but soon everyone finds out more about Screwy and how different and rusty he looks. Note: "Cast Off" was featured in the "Telling the Truth" VHS from May 28, 2002 before it aired on television.

=== Season 6 (2002–04) ===
No. overall	No. in season	Title	Written by	Storyboard by	Original release date
66	1	"Soupey Zowie and Diaper Dyna-mo"	Dave Dias	Alan Bunce	September 21, 2002
66	1	"Magnetitus"	Michael Stokes	Christophe Villez	September 21, 2002
66	1	"A Little Wish"	Steve Sullivan	Frank Lintzen	September 21, 2002
Zowie and Binky want to play with the big kids; When Screwy comes down with a case of Magnetitus. It spreads all over the kids including Olie; Zowie and Olie stay with Pappy on his farm. Note: This is the first episode where Billy Bevel is voiced by Kristopher Clarke due to Alexandra Powell's departure.
67	2	"Blast From The Past"	Alice Prodanou	Frank Lintzen	November 17, 2002
67	2	"Gone Screwy"	Alice Prodanou	Christophe Villez	November 17, 2002
67	2	"Mother Giz"	Steve Sullivan	François Bruel	November 17, 2002
Aunt Polie-anna gives Pappy a surprise visit and reminisces on her many adventures after getting swept away through a wormhole; Olie and Screwy become cosmobot cadets and Billy feels left out; Mom and Dad go dancing and Uncle Gizmo comes to babysit the kids.
68	3	"A Little Jingle Jangle Sparkler"	Michael Stokes	Lance Taylor	April 16, 2003
68	3	"A Gift for Klanky Klaus"	Nicola Barton	Christophe Villez	April 16, 2003
68	3	"All's Squared Away Day"	Elizabeth Keyushian	Frank Lintzen	April 16, 2003
It's Zowie's turn to pick the Jingle Jangle star while out star grazing, but when she picks a very old star, Olie isn't convinced it will shine; Zowie gives a present to Klanky Klaus; When Olie loses the last piece for Billy's present, he must find it. Note: John Neville replaces Howard Jerome as the voice of Klanky Klaus.
69	4	"Give It Back Gloomius"	Steve Sullivan	Alan Bunce	August 12, 2003
69	4	"Olie Unsproinged"	Robin Stein	Tom Nesbitt	August 12, 2003
69	4	"Bot O' the Housey"	Steve Sullivan	François Bruel	August 12, 2003
When Gloomius takes the swing, Pollie Pi's dog, and the stuff from Polieville Park, the Polies find a way to get it back. When Olie hurts himself from a boinky ball trick, he must find a way to help his spring. While Percy goes away on a trip with Baxter, he leaves Olie and Billy in charge of Housey. Note: Paul Haddad voices Gloomius Maximus, replacing James Woods, who played the part in The Great Defender of Fun.
70	5	"Gumming Up the Works"	Alice Prodanou	Alan Bunce	August 22, 2003
70	5	"Hands Across Polieville"	Michael Stokes	Christophe Villez	August 22, 2003
70	5	"Rolie Polie Pop Tops"	Steve Sullivan	Lance Taylor	August 22, 2003
When some gum escapes Planet Polie, Olie and Billy make it return; Olie, Billy, and Screwy get stuck together from an invention that Olie worked on and so are forced to do things together as a team; Screwy loses his head when he drinks too much soda, so Olie, Billy and Space Boy try to retrieve it.
71	6	"Lunchmaster 3000"	Steve Sullivan	François Bruel	August 26, 2003
71	6	"Puzzle Planet"	Nicola Barton	Christophe Villez	August 26, 2003
71	6	"A Totally Backwards Day"	Jennifer Pertsch	Lance Taylor	August 26, 2003
Olie grows jealous of Screwy's new lunchbox that can talk; Olie, Billy, and Aunt Polie-anna search for the missing pieces of Billy's board game on a distant planet; Everything in Polieville has turned backwards due to it spinning in reverse, so Olie does things backwards for a day, from sliding up the slide to talking backwards.
72	7	"Zowie's School Daze"	Alice Prodanou	François Bruel	September 6, 2003
72	7	"Beacon Blinkin' Day"	Robin Stein	Tom Nesbitt	September 6, 2003
72	7	"When Mr. Sunny Gets Blue"	Robin Stein	Tom Nesbitt	September 6, 2003
Olie prepares Zowie for her first day of school; When Olie embarrasses himself by ripping his pants in front of everyone at school, he has a "blinking beacon day" and his parents try to make him feel better about it; Mr. Sunny turns blue after Olie and his family forget to thank him on the Polie equivalent of Thanksgiving, and they must help him to become happy again.
73	8	"Straighten Upper-er to the Rescue"	Story by : Steve Sullivan; Written by : Elizabeth Keyushian	Lance Taylor	January 17, 2004
73	8	"The Great Manner Hunt"	Alice Prodanou	Tom Nesbitt	January 17, 2004
73	8	"Polie Poppin' Day"	Steve Sullivan	Christophe Villez	January 17, 2004
Olie's antennae loses its shape, so he has to wear a straighten-upper-er for a week until his antennae is straight again; Olie and Billy make videos around Polieville to teach Zowie some good manners; It's a special day for the Polies but Olie, Zowie and Pollie Pi can't decide how to celebrate it.
74	9	"The Secret Life of Babies"	Steve Sullivan	Frank Lintzen	February 12, 2004
74	9	"Shhhh"	Story by : Steve Sullivan; Written by : Elizabeth Keyushian	Lance Taylor	February 12, 2004
74	9	"The Coochie Coochie Coo Blues"	Story by : Jennifer Pertsch; Written by : Alice Prodanou	Christophe Villez	February 12, 2004
Coochie and her brother Coo are introduced in this episode with their first few weeks in the Polie family; Olie and Billy try to be quiet so the babies can sleep; Zowie grows jealous of the babies because they get so much attention.
75	10	"Big Babies"	Robin Stein	Francois Bruel	April 28, 2004
75	10	"Kooky Kites"	Robin Stein	Frank Lintzen	April 28, 2004
75	10	"Twin Sittin"	Hugh Duffy	Frank Lintzen	April 28, 2004
Percy builds a machine and the babies, being babies, activate it without even knowing what it does, causing Olie to switch brains with Spot and the babies to switch brains with the parents. so Zowie finds a way to get everyone to switch back; It's Kooky Kite Day and the Polie kids are excited to get started on Kite making with Coochie and Coo even getting in on the action; Uncle Gizmo is over to babysit Olie, Zowie, Coochie and Coo which leads Olie, Zowie and the babies to discover how much of a good babysitter he is.
76	11	"A Polie Family Frolic"	Story by : Nadine van der Velde; Written by : Alice Prodanou	Andrew Tan and Lance Taylor	January 30, 2004
The first part of "The Baby Bot Chase".
77	12	"Has Anybody Seen My Coo?"	Scott Kraft	Christophe Villez	January 30, 2004
The second part of "The Baby Bot Chase".
78	13	"Babies Go Home"	Steve Sullivan	Andrew Tan and Lance Taylor	January 30, 2004
The third part of "The Baby Bot Chase".

== Films (2002–03) ==
No.	Title	Directed by	Written by	Storyboard by	Original release date
1	"The Great Defender of Fun"	Ron Pitts	Nadine van der Velde	Andrew Tan, Lance Taylor and Christophe Villez	August 13, 2002
An evil space pirate named Gloomius Maximus (voiced by James Woods) tries to drain all the happiness and fun out of everyone. Unfortunately for Olie, an invitation to Zowie's third birthday party accidentally flies off into space and makes its way aboard Gloomius's ship. Gloomius never had a birthday party himself, so he sets out to make Zowie's as miserable as possible. He zaps the robots with the Glum Beam and takes them to the Galaxy of Gloom. Between Olie's Super Silly Ray and some help from his favourite heroes Space Boy and Space Dog, the day is saved by silliness. In the end, Gloomius Maximus becomes good after Zowie invites him to her party and makes it his birthday, too. Note: This is the last time Billy Bevel is voiced by Alexandra Powell.
2	"The Baby Bot Chase"	Ron Pitts	Scott Kraft, Alice Prodanou, Steve Sullivan and Nadine van der Velde	Andrew Tan, Lance Taylor and Christophe Villez	June 3, 2003
Two Baby Bots named Coochie and Coo ride from the Mothership on a star, where all the babies in the Polie galaxy are made. When there is not enough room in Coupey, Olie and his family must take Gloomius Maximus' pirate ship to the Mothership. Afterwards, Gloomius adds Coochie and Coo to the Polie family after the Nursebot (Kindly Lady) reveals that the Mothership is not their real home.
