= Rolie Polie Olie =

Animated series created by William Joyce

- Also known as: William Joyce's Rolie Polie Olie
- Genre: Comic science fiction Science fantasy Retrofuturism
- Created by: William Joyce
- Based on: Characters by William Joyce
- Written by: Nadine van der Velde; Scott Kraft; Carol Commiss; Melissa Clark Ben Joseph
- Directed by: Mike Fallows (season 1) (Note: Supervising director in seasons 2–5)); Ron Pitts (seasons 2–6); Bill Giggie (seasons 4–5)
- Voices of: Cole Caplan; Kristen Bone; Alexandra Tucci; Kristopher Clarke; Catherine Disher; Adrian Truss; Len Carlson; Robert Smith
- Theme music composer: Brent Barkman; Pete Coulman
- Opening theme: "He's Rolie Polie Olie" by Brent Barkman and Pete Coulman
- Ending theme: "He's Rolie Polie Olie" (instrumental)
- Composers: Brent Barkman; Pete Coulman; Tim Thorney; Tom Thorney; Carl Lenox; Eric Schenkman (season 6)
- Countries of origin: Canada; France
- Original language: English
- No. of seasons: 6
- No. of episodes: 78 (228 segments) (list of episodes)

Production
- Executive producers: William Joyce; Michael Hirsh; Patrick Loubert (seasons 1–5); Fabrice Giger (seasons 1–5); Clive A. Smith (seasons 1–5); Scott Dyer (season 6); Corinne Kouper (season 6)
- Producers: Corinne Kouper (seasons 1–5); Pamela Slavin (season 1); Pamela Lehn (seasons 2–5); Susie Grondin (season 6)
- Running time: 24 minutes (8 minutes for each individual episode)
- Production companies: Nelvana Limited; Métal Hurlant Productions s.a.r.l. (seasons 1–5); Sparx* (seasons 1–5); Sparkling* Animation (season 6)

Original release
- Network: La Cinquième/France 5 (France); Playhouse Disney (United States); CBC Television (Canada)
- Release: October 4, 1998 – April 28, 2004

Rolie Polie Olie is an animated preschool television series created by William Joyce, and is produced by Nelvana in co-production with La Cinquième/France 5 and in association with the Canadian Broadcasting Corporation & the Disney Channel. The show focuses on a robot boy and his family who are composed of several spheres and other three-dimensional geometric shapes. The show was one of the earliest series that was fully animated in CGI. The series was broadcast from October 4, 1998, to April 28, 2004, and was followed with two straight-to-video films titled The Great Defender of Fun and The Baby Bot Chase, in 2002 and 2003 respectively.

Rolie Polie Olie won a Gemini Award in Canada for "Best Animated Program" in 1999. The show also won a Daytime Emmy Award for "Outstanding Special Class Animated Program" in 2000 and 2005. William Joyce won a 1999 Daytime Emmy for Best Production Design for this series. The show has a vintage atmosphere, with futuristic elements and it is speculated that it may be set in the 1950s, while being influenced by rubber hose animation.

== Synopsis ==
The show focuses on the Polie family, who live in a teapot-shaped house named Housey in a geometric world (Planet Polie, which in itself is located in a whole galaxy) populated by robot-based characters. The stories revolve around a young robot named Olie learning life lessons and going on wacky adventures (either real or imaginative) while growing up. These often include his younger sister Zowie, his inventor father Percy, his hard-working mother Polina, his fun-loving grandfather Pappy, and his dog Spot. Although most of the main cast consists of circular bots, other characters are featured in other shapes, such as Olie's friend Billy Bevel and his family, who are square-shaped bots from Planet Cubey.

== Characters ==
- Olie Polie – A 6-year-old robot boy and the show's main character. He is very friendly, inquisitive, and loves his family and friends.
- Zowie Polie (pronounced "Zoey") – Olie's 3-year-old younger sister, Gizmo's niece, Pappy's granddaughter and Percy and Polina's daughter. She is also very inquisitive (The episode But Why?, for example, has her keep on annoying the family by asking "Why?" about everything imaginable) and loud, speaking in Broken English. She loves Olie and enjoys emulating him, sometimes to Olie's annoyance, too.
- Spot – Spot is Olie's faithful dog. As revealed in the episodes "But Why?" and "Spot's Birthday", he was given his name because he left a "spot" on the carpet as a puppy.
- Mr. Percy Polie – Olie and Zowie's father and Pappy's younger son. He is an inventor, whose various inventions frequently get out of hand and get him and the family into trouble. His voice is inspired by Bing Crosby.
- Mrs. Polina Polie – Olie and Zowie's mother and Percy's wife. She is a housekeeper. Her voice is inspired by Olive Oyl.
- Pappy Polie – Percy and Gizmo's father, Polina's father-in-law and Olie and Zowie's paternal grandfather. He runs a farm by himself and is best known for his unruly dentures. Additionally, he owns a cow named Ol' Precious and a horse named Clippy Clop along with an unnamed chicken family on his farm.
- Billy Bevel – Olie's best friend. He lives next door. He is a cube shaped boy who, along with his family, is originally from Planet Cubey.
- Gizmo Polie – Olie and Zowie's paternal uncle who is also Percy's older brother, Polina's brother-in-law and Pappy's older son. He rides a motorcycle named Motorboy, and is also inspired by Elvis Presley.
- Aunt Polie-Anna – Olie and Zowie's paternal great aunt, Pappy's sister, Percy and Gizmo's aunt and Polina's aunt-in-law who appears in "The Baby Bot Chase" and Season 6.
- Baxter and Bonita 'Chiquita' Bevel – Billy's parents. Baxter wears glasses and has a surprisingly deep laugh, despite having a somewhat high-pitched voice. Bonita is an accomplished dancer and acts similar to her husband. They are friends of Mr. and Mrs. Polie.
- Space Boy – A young super-hero and star of Olie's favorite TV show of the same name. Along with his companion Space Dog, he frequently saves the universe from various threats on his show, and occasionally appears to help out Olie. Both Space Boy and Space Dog resemble Olie and Spot, with the main difference being that the former are blue and silver, and the latter are yellow and brown.
- Coochie and Coo Polie – Olie and Zowie's adoptive baby twin brother and sister. They first appear in the movie "The Baby Bot Chase" and reappear in a handful of episodes towards the end of season 6.
- Binky Bevel – Billy's baby brother. His head has the ability to spin when his belly button is pressed in. He is best friends with Zowie. At first, she was jealous of him and didn't want to get along with him, But they eventually gave in and became friends.
- Screwy – A kid introduced in season 5, specifically that of a lugnut. In his early appearances, Screwy acted as a bully towards Olie and his friends. However, Screwy quickly refrained from this behaviour and became a member of the gang.
- Pollie Pi – A red-haired female classmate and friend of Olie and Billy. She first appeared in the Valentine's Day–themed episode "Looove Bug", in which she first moved into Polieville as Olie and Billy, who competed with each other for Pollie's affections, immediately fell in love (via being shot by the Love Bug) with her. Pollie also owns a pink dog similar to Spot named Fifi.
- Wheelie – A teenager with a single wheel instead of legs due to the fact that he was born in that way. He is very athletic and acts as a sort of mentor towards Olie and Billy. He was introduced by the end of season 4.
- Dicey – the Bevel family's pet cat. She is often chased by Spot and is orange with a body that, as her name implies, resembles two dice.
- Mrs. Ethel Triangle – Olie's teacher. She has a triangular hairstyle, body and, earrings.
- Big Gene Green and Little Gene Green – Two aliens from the planet Littlegreen who accidentally crash–landed on Planet Polie one day and befriended Olie and his family. They reappear in the episode 'Making The Best Of It', when Olie and his dad visit their planet, only to find it much too small for their comfort, and later in the episodes 'Invasion Of the Ticklers!' and the TV movie 'The Great Defender Of Fun'. They are notable for the way they often 'backward speak' sentences similar to Yoda.
- Chunk Squarey – An adolescent pop musician who, like the Bevels, is from Planet Cubey. His song and dance, "The Twirl," is a major hit around the galaxy. He is apparently friends with his fans, the Bevels and the Polies. His name is loosely based on Chuck Berry and Billy has a Poster of him up in his room.
- Klanky Klaus – The show's equivalent of Santa Claus, he lives on his own planet, Chillsville.
- Gloomius Maximus – An evil space pirate who has the power to eradicate fun, and make the universe gloomy, hence his name. He is the main villain in The Great Defender of Fun and makes a few appearances on the show during Season 6 as reformed character as well in the 2nd movie, "The Baby Bot Chase".

== Voice cast ==
- Cole Caplan as Olie
- Kristen Bone as Zowie
- Alexandra Tucci as Billy Bevel (seasons 1–5)
  - Kristopher Clarke as Billy Bevel (season 6)
- Robert Norman Smith as Spot, Space Dog, TV Announcer
- Adrian Truss as Percy, Uncle Gizmo, TV Announcer, Pappy Star, TV Host
- Andrew Craig as Chunk Squarey
- Kylie Fairlie as Space Boy, Percy as a child
- Neil Crone as Dr. Geary
- Catherine Disher as Polina, Hammy Lady, TV Contestant, Tape Voice
- Len Carlson as Pappy, TV Announcer, Dr. Callinghouse, Space Boy Announcer, Chef Rotundo, Radio Announcer, Spookie Ookie, TV Announcer 2, TV Detective, TV Host
- Tedde Moore as Aunt Polie-Anna
- Noah Reid as Screwy
- Jake Goldsbie as Junior Littlegreen
- Julie Lemieux as Coochie, Coo, Mousey (season 6)
- Scott McCord as Kooky
- Jennifer Gould as Miss Triangle
- Ellen-Ray Hennessy as Bonita
- Rebecca Brenner as Pollie Pi
- Philip Williams as Baxter, TV Announcer
- Michael Cera as Gizmo as a child
- Sunday Muse as Binky, Bogey Bot
- Richard Binsley as Dicey, Gene Littlegreen
- Howard Jerome as Klanky Claus (seasons 2–5)
  - John Neville as Klanky Claus (season 6)
- Al Mukadam as Wheelie
- Rick Jones as TV Announcer
- Tracey Moore – Mousey (seasons 1–5), Love Bug
- Susan Roman – Fifi
- Ron Pardo – TV Actor
- Juan Chioran – Willy and Wally Jolly
- Elizabeth Hanna – Kindly Lady
- Ron Rubin – Bot-ler, Lunchmaster 3000, TV Announcer
- James Woods – Gloomius Maximus ("The Great Defender of Fun")
- Paul Haddad – Gloomius Maximus (as Gloomius' singing voice in The Great Defender of Fun (uncredited) and as his speaking voice in all other appearances)

== Episodes ==
Season	Episodes	Originally released	
Season	Episodes	First released	Last released
1	13	October 4, 1998	December 30, 1998
2	13	June 8, 1999	November 27, 1999
3	13	January 11, 2000	March 1, 2001
4	13	July 4, 2001	October 25, 2001
5	13	December 11, 2001	June 14, 2002
6	13	September 21, 2002	April 28, 2004
Films	2	August 13, 2002	June 3, 2003

== Broadcast and distribution ==
In the United States, the series was broadcast on Disney Channel's pre-school block, later named Playhouse Disney. As an exchange from Nelvana for securing the broadcast rights, Disney handled merchandising and distribution rights in the country. The series reran on Disney Junior from March 23, 2012, until September 28, 2014.

The series also aired on Disney Channel and Playhouse Disney networks in Latin America, Europe, Middle East, Asia and Australia.

In the United Kingdom it aired on the children's block of Channel 5, Milkshake!, from when it first aired all the way up until late 2007.

The first five seasons were made available on Disney+ in the United States on September 29, 2021.
