= Karleen Pendleton Jiménez =

American-Canadian writer and academic

- Born: California
- Occupations: Memoirist, academic
- Writing career
- Period: 2000s-present
- Notable works: Are You a Boy or a Girl?, How to Get a Girl Pregnant

Karleen Pendleton Jiménez is an American-Canadian writer and academic. She is best known for her 2000 book Are You a Boy or a Girl?, a 2001 Lambda Literary Award finalist which was adapted into the 2008 film Tomboy, and her 2011 memoir How to Get a Girl Pregnant, a 2012 Lambda Literary Award finalist.

Originally from Los Angeles, California, she is currently a full professor in the School of Education at Trent University in Peterborough, Ontario. In addition to her literary work, she also co-edited, with Isabel Killoran, the academic anthology Unleashing the Unpopular: Talking About Sexual Orientation and Gender Diversity in Education.

== Works ==
- Are You a Boy or a Girl? (2000, ISBN 1-896781-14-4)
- Unleashing the Unpopular (2009, ISBN 978-0871731715)
- How to Get a Girl Pregnant (2011, ISBN 978-1926639406)
- Tomboys and Other Gender Heroes: Confessions from the Classroom (2016, ISBN 978-1433126949)
- The Street Belongs to Us (2021, ISBN 9781551528403)
