= Callaway family =

American business family

The Callaway family is an American business family originating largely from the U.S. state of Georgia.

== History ==
The Callaway family of Georgia descends from Peter Callaway (1640–1715) an immigrant who came to the United States from England. Fuller Earle Callaway, and Cason Jewell Callaway (1894–1961) were part of this same family; and their branch of the family had migrated to west Georgia (to the cities of Columbus and LaGrange).

== Family members ==
- Peter Callaway (1640–1715, m. Elizabeth Johnson)
  - John Callaway Sr. (1685-1770, m. Mary Gould)
    - Edward Callaway (1711-1769)
      - John Callaway (1746-1821), founder of Callaway Plantation
        - Enoch Callaway (1792-1959, m. Martha "Patsy" Reeves)
          - Rev. Abner Reeves Callaway (1832-1898), second-generation Baptist minister
            - (m. Sarah Jane Howard)
              - Enoch Callaway, Mayor of LaGrange - 1895-1897 (1853-1901, m. Frances Banks)
                - Enoch Callaway Jr. (1892-1961, m. Jennie Crowell)
                  - Enoch Callaway III (1924-2014), psychiatrist
                  - Jane Louisa Crowell Callaway (1929-1931)
              - Mary Glenn Callaway Arnold (1855-1907)
              - Howard Robert Callaway (1857-1927)
              - Lucy B. Callaway (1859, died in infancy)
              - Abbie R. Callaway (1860-1865)
              - William B. Callaway (1863, died in infancy)
              - Pope Francis Callaway (1865-1923)
              - Abner Reeves Callaway Jr (1868-1869)
              - Fuller Earle Callaway (1870-1928, m. Ida Cason)
                - Fuller Earle Callaway Jr. (1907-1992), CEO of Callaway Mills
                - Cason Jewell Callaway (1894-1961), founded Callaway Gardens
                  - Bo Callaway, congressman and United States secretary of the Army (m. Beth Walton)
                    - Betsy Callaway Considine (m. Terry Considine)
            - (m. Mary Wilbourne Ely)
              - Ely Reeves Callaway (1880-1956)
                - Ely Callaway Jr. (1919-2001), founder of Callaway Golf Company
                  - Ely Reeves Callaway III (1948-2023), founder of Callaway Cars
                  - Nicholas Callaway, founder of Callaway Arts & Entertainment
                  - Lisa Callaway
                - Abbie Leila Callaway Allen (1883-1974)
                - Harry Wilbourn Callaway (1884-1950)
