= The Save-Ums! =

Animated children's television series

- Genre: Animated series Adventure
- Created by: Dan Clark; Don Asher; Dave Pressler
- Voices of: Tajja Isen; Aaryn Doyle; Mark Rendall; Cameron Ansell; Mitchell Eisner; Jordan Francis; Connor Price; Carlos Díaz; Scott Beaudin; Melanie Tonello; Alexandra Lai; Sugar Lyn Beard
- Theme music composer: Will Anderson
- Opening theme: "The Save-Ums!"
- Ending theme: "The Save-Ums!" (instrumental)
- Composer: Will Anderson
- Countries of origin: Canada; United States
- Original language: English
- No. of seasons: 2
- No. of episodes: 39 (78 segments)

Production
- Executive producers: Steven DeNure; Neil Court; Beth Stevenson
- Producer: Kym Hyde
- Running time: 22 minutes (11 minutes per segment)
- Production companies: The Dan Clark Company; Decode Entertainment (Note: As DECODE/Save-Ums Productions Inc.)

Original release
- Network: CBC Television (Canada); Discovery Kids (United States)
- Release: February 24, 2003 – July 11, 2005

The Save-Ums! is an animated children's television series produced by Decode Entertainment with animation production by C.O.R.E. Toons. The series first premiered both on CBC and on Discovery Kids as part of the Ready Set Learn! programming block on February 24, 2003, and ended on July 11, 2005 with 39 episodes being produced.

== Premise ==
The Save-Ums, which consist of Jazzi, Noodle, Custard, Ka-Chung, Foo and B.B. Jammies, are a patrol group of six aliens of various appearances, who help various critters when they run into difficulty.

Each episode begins with a call on the "adventure screen" (essentially a videophone) from an inhabitant of the world in which the Save-Ums live. The caller describes the difficulty that needs to be resolved, and then select Save-Ums travel to the scene of the problem. There are three different places that the Save-Ums travel to solve problems: Rock World, an island with a huge mountain; Lava World, a tropical island with a volcano; and Wave World, which is under the ocean.

The Save-Ums then assist in solving the problem. Each episode ends with the problem being solved and the Save-Ums returning to their safety headquarters.

== Characters ==
=== The Save-Ums ===
- Jazzi (voiced by Tajja Isen) is a purple passionate girl with red hair tied into two pigtails who dreams to speak the language of wild horses. She is afraid of water and is shown to be the leader in numerous episodes. She is known to say "People, we have a plan!" whenever she, another Save-Um, or a secondary character has an idea.
- Noodle (voiced by Mark Rendall in season 1 and Cameron Ansell in season 2) is a male white pound puppy-like alien who is the most intelligent and mature of the group, often being the voice of reason and helping others to see what is right. He also pilots the subchopper, a helicopter that travels on air or under the sea.
- Custard (voiced by Jordan Francis) is a cool male purple and red cat-eared Save-Um who pilots the Zoomer, a powerboat that travels on either water or snow, and goes on most missions. He is known for saying "Bam!" when he has an idea.
- Ka-Chung (voiced by Mitchell Eisner) is a male red and white hippopotamus-like alien who is the toughest Save-Um. He is known to shout "Ka-Chung!" as his catchphrase. He strongs the Ka-Drill, a tunnel boring machine.
- Foo (voiced by Aaryn Doyle) is a female blue and yellow long limbed angelfish-like bird who is the nicest and most sensitive of the Save-Ums. She also goes on most missions. She flies a jet pack.
- B.B. Jammies (voiced by Connor Price) is Jazzi's miniature brother, who has a purple diamond-shaped head. He is the smallest and the youngest of the Save-Ums. Since he is too little to go on missions, he mostly plays with the Puffs.

=== Other recurring ===
- The Puffs are six tiny fluffy colorful of rainbow pets who live and play with the Save-Ums, but don't go on any missions. They sometimes are a help to them.
- Winston (voiced by Asa Perlman impersonating Woody Allen) is a bespectacled whale who lives in Wave World and has an underwater garden.
- Tony (voiced by Demore Barnes) and Sal (voiced by unknown) are army crabs who live in Wave World.
- Andre (voiced by Amanda Soha) is a little super seahorse who lives in Wave World.
- Olena (voiced by Sugar Lyn Beard) is a little octopus who lives in Wave World.
- Raymundo (voiced by Carlos Díaz) and Peque (voiced by José Manuel Vieira) are Spanish ants who live in Lava World.
- Oscar (voiced by Benny Shilling (Season 1) and Scott Beaudin (Season 2)) and Tina (voiced by Melanie Tonello) are little monkeys who live in Lava World.
- Baby Dino is a baby dinosaur babysat by Raymundo and Peque, who lives in Lava World.
- Colin (voiced by Rob Smith in season 1 and Jonathan Wilson in season 2) and Elizabat (voiced by Bryn McAuley in season 1 and Phoebe McAuley in season 2) are furry bats who live in Rock World.
- Dory (voiced by Alexandra Lai) and Terrell (voiced by Frank Ferlisi) are glow-grubs who live in Rock World.

== Episodes ==
=== Season 1 (2003) ===
- The UK dubbed episodes of season 1 consist of just one story segment and originally broadcast on Channel 5 as part of the Milkshake! block.
- This season has 26 episodes divided into 52 segments.
1. Untangle That Octopus!/Runaway Toy Car! (February 24, 2003)
2. Dino Sandwich!/Where Are Winston's Glasses? (March 3, 2003)
3. The Mystery of Winston's Garden!/Operation Banana Split! (March 10, 2003)
4. Scary Things Don't Blink!/Tina in the Sky! (March 17, 2003)
5. Save That Little Tree!/A Rock in Winston's Garden! (March 24, 2003)
6. Operation Dino Diaper!/Rescue Wonder Winston! (March 31, 2003)
7. Fix That Broken Drum!/Brush That Dino's Tooth! (April 7, 2003)
8. Andre's Super Water Bubble!/Catch That Falling Crab! (April 14, 2003)
9. Making Little Peque Safe!/Andre's Hole in One! (April 21, 2003)
10. Oscar Has a Flat/Picnic Panic in Wave World! (April 28, 2003)
11. The Ghost of Wave World!/Tina's Extra Special Thing! (May 5, 2003)
12. Unstick That Ant!/Follow That Mystery Map! (May 12, 2003)
13. Wash That Dirty Dino!/Save That Fish! (May 19, 2003)
14. Find That Little Grub's Phone!/Bats and Oranges! (May 26, 2003)
15. Swing That Baby Dino!/Rescue That Loco Coco! (June 2, 2003)
16. Danger: Sticky Food!/Too Many Bananas! (June 9, 2003)
17. Lost in Rock World!/The Vanishing! (June 16, 2003)
18. Operation Seesaw!/Two Cakes in One! (September 22, 2003)
19. Time to Paint a Picture!/Pick Up That Spoon! (September 29, 2003)
20. Foo is Powerful!/Stop Winston's Hiccups! (October 6, 2003)
21. Fix That Trophy!/A Little Goes a Long Way! (October 13, 2003)
22. Tie That Balloon!/Pitch That Tent! (October 20, 2003)
23. Monkey Up a Tree!/It's Halloween! (October 27, 2003)
24. Entertain Those Grubs!/Keep Those Monkeys Cool! (November 3, 2003)
25. Super Cool Birthday Message!/Hide and Seek! (November 10, 2003)
26. Save That Ant!/Find That Pet! (November 17, 2003)

=== Season 2 (2005) ===
- The UK dubbed episodes of season 2 consist of just one segment and originally broadcast on as part of the Milkshake! block.
- This season has 13 episodes divided into 26 segments.
1. Make That Grub Gluey Again!/Save That Sandman! (April 18, 2005)
2. Operation Beat Poetry Party!/Hopscotch Emergency! (April 25, 2005)
3. Rockabye That Baby Dino!/Splinter Emergency! (May 2, 2005)
4. Lava World Race!/Scratch that Whale's Back! (May 9, 2005)
5. Make That Whale a Doll!/Operation Rocco Robot! (May 16, 2005)
6. Save Those Glasses!/Extra Icky Spider Web! (May 23, 2005)
7. Make Winston Go Poof!/Stop That Ice Cream! (May 30, 2005)
8. Red Puff's Big Adventure!/Elizabat's Pet Potato! (June 6, 2005)
9. Make Those Valentines!/Loco Coco Is Sinking! (June 13, 2005)
10. Keep on Dancing!/Spooky Tickle Adventure! (June 20, 2005)
11. Smile, Silly Sea Sammies!/Tony And Sal's Treasure Hunt! (June 27, 2005)
12. Grab That Crab!/Teddysaurus Rescue! (July 4, 2005)
13. Mount Rock World Adventure!/Lift That Weight! (July 11, 2005)
