= Aaryn Doyle =

Canadian actress (born 1993)

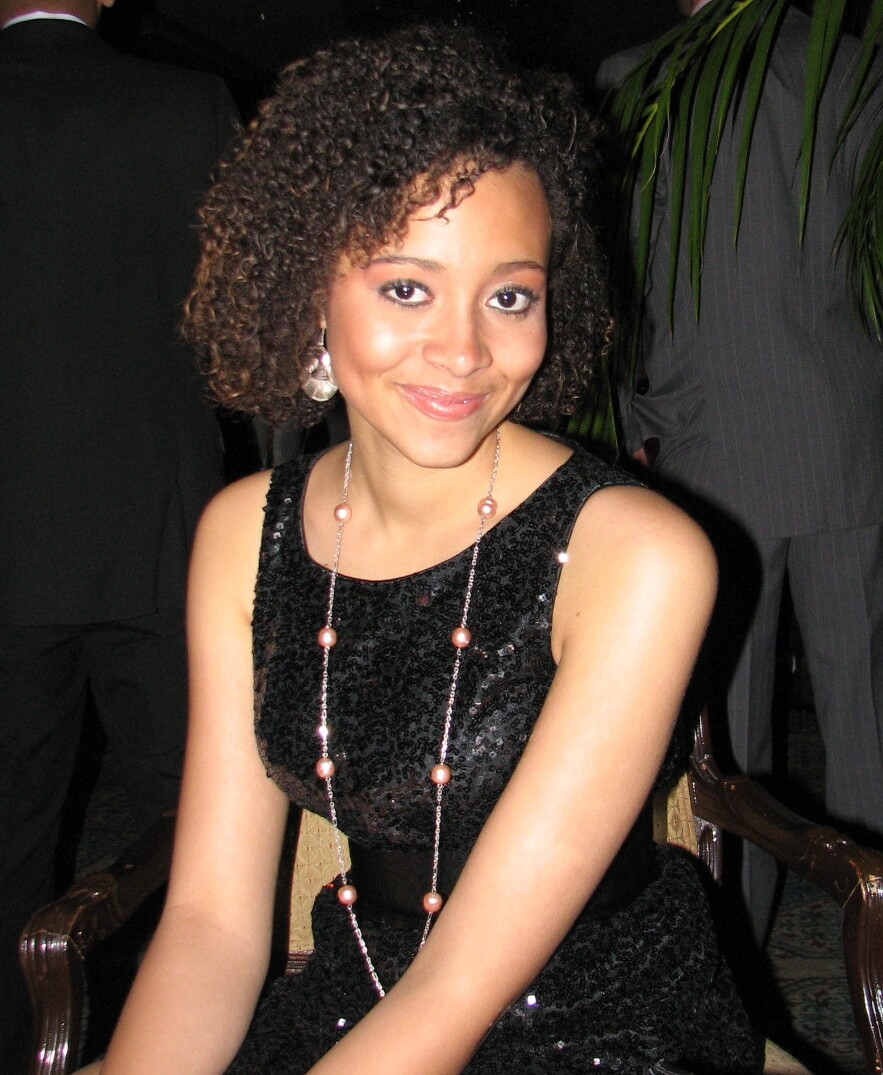
- Doyle in 2008
- Born: Aaryn Élan Doyle; January 4, 1993 (age 33); Ontario, Canada
- Occupations: Actress; singer; dancer
- Years active: 1999–present
- Website: https://aarynelan.wixsite.com/aaryndoyle

Aaryn Élan Doyle (born January 4, 1993) is a Canadian actress, singer and dancer. She is best known for her role as Lola Scott in the Disney Channel Original Movie Camp Rock. In 2008, Aaryn was signed to the Ford Modeling Agency. Doyle has represented brand lines such as Diesel and Nike, as seen in Camp Rock red carpet shots.

== Life and career ==
Aaryn Élan started her career at the age of six while attending St. John Catholic School in Lincoln, following a win at Model Search America (MSA).

Aaryn has appeared in films, television shows, and commercials, and has also voiced many animation/voice-over projects. She was the lead female vocalist for a 12-piece Toronto band for 3 years from age 12 to 15, but later performed with other TO bands, and was a member of CTV's Canadian Idol choir ensemble in 2005. In the fall of 2007, Doyle joined the cast of the Disney Channel Original Movie Camp Rock with the Jonas Brothers and Demi Lovato. The film was released on June 20, 2008.

Aaryn was featured in the Camp Rock song "What It Takes", in addition to contributing vocals for the tracks "Our Time Is Here" and "We Rock" as the character Lola Scott. However, Doyle did not reprise her role in Camp Rock 2: The Final Jam.

Aaryn Élan appeared in the films Sins of the Father and Jasper, Texas. She is a cast member of the animated television series Miss Spider's Sunny Patch Kids with Rick Moranis, before starring in Miss Spider's Sunny Patch Friends. She also stars in the Emmy and Grammy award-winning and nominated animated series The Save-Ums!, as well as Friends and Heroes and the animated short film/TV film Tomboy.

Past years have seen Aaryn recording with her youth trio for a CCC production company; their tracks can be heard on CTS. Between the ages of 10 and 12, she has recorded over 70 pop/gospel songs and has starred in CBC radio dramas.

In 2007, she appeared on an episode of Little Mosque on the Prairie as a teenage Muslim girl, followed by a guest starring role as a model on The Latest Buzz (season 3). In 2010, Aaryn Elan's vocal styling was used in the pilot episode of Life Unexpected, singing solo on the reproduced cover soundtrack of "I Will Always Love You".

Aaryn is a certified yoga instructor with over a decade of practice on her mat (so to speak). Aaryn is an advocated for the invisible disability community as she has recently shared via TikTok that she is diagnosed with hypermobile spectrum disorder (HSD) and has begun sharing her experiences as well as tailoring her yoga classes as well as her personal practice to be more intentionally suited to hypermobile bodies with connective tissue disorders.

== Filmography ==
Year	Title	Role	Notes
2002	Sins of the Father	Carole Robertson	Television film
2002–2004, 2006	The Save-Ums!	Foo	Voice, 45 episodes
2003	Jasper, Texas	Young Girl	Television film
2003–2004	The World of Piwi	Lulu, Angie	French-Canadian animated television series
2004–2008	Miss Spider's Sunny Patch Friends	Pansy	Voice
2005	Skylar	Skylar, Honouree	Drama (adapted for stage)
2005	Canadian Idol	Choir singer	Season 3 finale (CTV)
2007	Canadian Songwriters Hall of Fame	Herself	Guest appearance on "Words to Music" awards gala (CBC)
2007	Little Mosque on the Prairie	Muslim teen girl	"Best Intentions" Halaqa Teen 3 (CBC)
2007–2008	Friends and Heroes	Flore	Voice, 13 episodes
2008	Tomboy	Katy	
2008	Entertainment Tonight Canada	Model	ET Canada (Global)
2008	Camp Rock	Lola Scott	Television film (Disney Channel)
2009	The Latest Buzz	Lily	Decode Entertainment (Family and Disney Channel)
2010	Life Unexpected	Vocalist – "I Will Always Love You" original soundtrack cover for pilot episode	CW Network, CBS Television Studios, LY Productions, Mojo Films, Warner Bros. (TV)
2011	Against the Wall	Flirty Model	Lifetime Television (USA)

=== Other works ===
Year	Title	Role	Notes
2004	Say Ginger Ale	Young Girl	Radio drama CBC production by A&E and Ann Jansen
2005	Skylar "Beyond the Sound Barrier"	Skylar	Radio drama CBC production/Immigration Series by Marjorie Chan/James Roy

== Discography ==
=== Camp Rock (soundtrack) ===
- What It Takes
- Our Time Is Here (with Demi Lovato & Meaghan Jette Martin)
- We Rock (with the cast of Camp Rock)
- Hasta La Vista (with Roshon Fegan & Jordan Francis)

== Soundtrack ==
=== Life Unexpected (soundtrack) ===
- I Will Always Love You (Pilot) TV episode 2010

=== Miss Spider's Sunny Patch Friends (soundtrack) ===
- Hi Ho Away We Go (The Prince, the Princess and the Bee) TV episode/special 2006
- Do the Buggy Conga (The Thinking Stone/Big Bad Buggysitter) TV episode 2006
- Have A Happy hatch Day (Bug Your Mom Day: A Cloudy Day in Sunny Patch) TV episode 2005
- Faky Snaky Dance (Scary Scaly Tale: A Bug-A-Boo Day Play) TV episode 2004
- La la la Ladybug (Ant-tuition: Sing It Sister) TV episode 2004
