= Robert Smith (Canadian actor) =

Canadian actor (1965–2020)

- Born: Robert Norman Smith c. July 19, 1965; Canada
- Died: c. July 22, 2020 (aged 55); Minden Lake, Ontario, Canada
- Occupation: Actor
- Years active: 1993–2008
- Children: 2

Robert Norman Smith (c. July 19, 1965 – c. July 22, 2020) was a Canadian actor who was known as Rob Smith in his earlier works.

== Criminal charges ==
In 2008, Smith pleaded guilty to two charges of possessing and one charge of distributing child sexual abuse material. He received a 20-month prison sentence. In June 2020, he was charged with an additional two counts of distributing child sexual abuse material and three counts each of possessing and accessing child sexual abuse materials.

== Death ==
Smith's body was found in Minden Lake, Ontario, on July 26, 2020, after he was reported missing three days earlier. No foul play was suspected.

== Filmography ==
=== Film ===
List of performances in film
Year	Title	Role	Notes	Source
1999	Pushing Tin	Bob		
1999	Resurrection	Forensic man		
1999	Detroit Rock City	Simple Simon		
2000	CyberWorld	Buzzed		
2002	Chicago	Newspaper photographer		
2004	Saint Ralph	Santa Claus		
2005	Cinderella Man	Reporter		
2005	King's Ransom	David		
2007	King of Sorrow	John Baker		

=== Television ===
List of performances on television
Year	Title	Role	Notes	Source
1993	Beyond Reality	Male character	Episode: "Reunion"	
1998–2000	Mythic Warriors: Guardians of the Legend	Hate Spirit, Epimethius	Voice role	
1998–2000	Bad Dog	Berkeley	Voice role	
1998–2004	Rolie Polie Olie	Spot, Space Dog, TV Announcer	Voice role	
1998–1999	Dumb Bunnies	Poppa Bunny	Voice role	
1999–2001	Angela Anaconda	Coach Rhineheart	Voice role	
1999–2005	Little People: Big Discoveries	Freddie, Lucky, Fireman Joe/George, Walter, Smiley the Clown, additional animal characters	Voice role	
2003	1-800-Missing	Detective Anderson		
2003	Air Master	Additional voices	Voice role, English dub	
2003	The Save-Ums!	Colin	Voice role	
2003–2006	JoJo's Circus	Goliath	Voice role	
2003–2008	Chilly Beach	Jacques LaRock	Voice role, episodes: "The World Is Hot Enough", "The Canadian President"	
2004	Cold Squad	Boxcar	Episode: "Deadbeat"	
2004	Doc	Dan Malone		
2004	Franny's Feet	Additional voices	Voice role	
2004–2007	Miss Spider's Sunny Patch Friends	Holley	Voice role	
2005	Kojak	Dr. Tony Lewis		
2005	Kevin Hill	Joe Gaskins		
2007	Friends and Heroes	Additional voices	Voice role	

=== Video games ===
List of voice performances in video games
Year	Title	Role	Notes	Source
1998	Mega Man Legends	Teisel Bonne		
2000	The Misadventures of Tron Bonne	Teisel Bonne		
2000	Mega Man Legends 2	Teisel Bonne		

=== Advertising ===
List of performances in advertisements
Year	Title	Role	Notes	Source
2003–2006	Alexander Keith's Brewery	Scottish spokesman		

== See also ==
- Robert Cecil Smith, a live-action actor
- Robert O. Smith, a voice actor
