= Miss Spider's Sunny Patch Friends =

Canadian-British children's animated television series

- Genre: Children's television series
- Created by: David Kirk
- Based on: Sunny Patch toy line and Miss Spider series by David Kirk
- Developed by: Nadine van der Velde
- Voices of: Kristin Davis; Scott Beaudin; Rebecca Brenner; Mitchell Eisner; Julie Lemieux; Robert Smith; Tony Jay
- Theme music composer: Jeff Danna
- Opening theme: "Be Good to Bugs"
- Ending theme: "Be Good to Bugs" (instrumental)
- Composers: Jeff Danna; Norm Beaver
- Countries of origin: United States; United Kingdom; Canada
- Original language: English
- No. of seasons: 3
- No. of episodes: 43 (85 segments) (list of episodes)

Production
- Executive producers: Nicholas Callaway; David Kirk; Scott Dyer; Doug Murphy; Nadine van der Velde; Andy Russell (S2)
- Producer: Pam Lehn
- Running time: 24 minutes (12 minutes per episode)
- Production companies: Nelvana Limited; Absolute Pictures Limited; Callaway Arts & Entertainment

Original release
- Network: Nick Jr. (United States); Teletoon (Canada, season 1-2); Treehouse TV (Canada, season 3); Milkshake! (UK)
- Release: 7 September 2004 – 17 June 2007

Related
- Miss Spider's Sunny Patch Kids

Miss Spider's Sunny Patch Friends, sometimes shortened to Miss Spider or Sunny Patch, is a 2004 animated children's television series produced by Nelvana Limited and AbsoluteDigital Pictures in association with Callaway Arts & Entertainment as a follow-up to the television special Miss Spider's Sunny Patch Kids. Created by David Kirk and developed by Nadine van der Velde, it was based on Kirk's Sunny Patch brand and the accompanying Miss Spider book series. In Canada, the show aired on Teletoon before moving over to Treehouse TV. In the United States, it aired on Nick Jr. 43 episodes were produced.

== Premise ==
The show takes place in a peaceful meadow called "Sunny Patch" (a tiny town made of common forest items), populated by anthropomorphic bugs, and primarily focuses on a Spider family. The episodes follow the children's adventures playing in Sunny Patch and learning life lessons, such as being kind to others, being imaginative, having responsibility, and being curious about the world around them. They are threatened by two snakes, Mama Snake and Baby Snake.

== Episodes ==
| Season | Episodes | Originally released | |
| Season | Episodes | First released | Last released |
|---|---|---|---|
| 1 | 13 | September 7, 2004 | May 2, 2005 |
| 2 | 13 | December 10, 2004 | June 27, 2006 |
| 3 | 17 | March 22, 2006 | June 17, 2007 |
| Special | | July 24, 2006 | |

== Characters ==
The main characters

=== Main ===
- Miss Flora Spider (voiced by Kristin Davis in Seasons 1-2 (3 in the American version), Caroly Larson in Season 3 in the Canadian version and Maria Darling in the UK version) is an adoptee, adopted by Betty Beetle when her biological mother abandoned her before she hatched and Holley's wife. Miss Spider tries to be a kind and caring mother and gives equal time to all of her eight children. She strongly believes that "We have to be good to bugs, all bugs."
- Squirt (voiced by Scott Beaudin in the Canadian version and Joanna Ruiz in the UK version) is a curious and very adventurous lime green spider, with a flower hat on top. Squirt is considered to be the leader of the children and as such, more stories that focus on him than any other. He really enjoys surfing the air on his webs, dreams of flying like Shimmer or Dragon, and is often ready to take the lead in an adventure. Because of his impulsive and curious personality, he often needs the advice of his parents to help him with certain situations.
- Shimmer (voiced by Rebecca Brenner in the Canadian version and Maria Darling in the UK version) is a pink jewel beetle with an interest in sports and games. Shimmer is quite different from the rest of the family as she has abilities the others do not such as heat sensors. She is one of Miss Spider and Holley's adoptive children.
- Dragon (voiced by Mitchell Eisner in the Canadian version and Maria Darling in the UK version) is a purple dragonfly who is one of Miss Spider and Holley's adoptive children. He is the oldest of the Spider children and often very brash towards the others, especially Squirt. In many episodes, Dragon serves as an example of peer pressure. For example, in "Cry Buggie", Dragon makes fun of Squirt when he shows his feelings. However, he still loves his family.
- Bounce (voiced by Julie Lemieux in the Canadian version and Joanna Ruiz in the UK version) is a blue bedbug who is one of Miss Spider and Holley's adoptive children. He is a two-legged, high-energy bug and the only bug character in the show to have teeth. He and Dragon have been "best bug buddies" ever since they met because of their similar experiences regarding their native families.

=== Supporting ===
- Holley (voiced by Robert Smith in most of the series, Richard Clarkin in the episode "Night and Day/Cob Fog" in the Canadian version and David Holt in the UK version) is Miss Spider's best husband. Holley is a great musician who loves to play the guitar. He has a special thinking stone where he makes decisions.
- Spinner (voiced by Austin Di Iulio in Seasons 1 and 2, Cameron Ansell in Season 3 in the Canadian version and Lynn Cleckner in the UK version) is a yellow spider with very large eyeglasses just like Holley's. He looks almost exactly like him, with Miss Spider's coloring. He is a very smart and wise bug often looked to for advice. While he isn't great at physical activities, he has a wonderful talent for the "bugpipes".
- Pansy (voiced by Aaryn Doyle in the Canadian version and Maria Darling in the UK version) and Snowdrop (voiced by Alexandra Lai in the Canadian version and Lynn Cleckner in the UK version) are orange spiders who are two identical twins. Pansy sings well, but not as naturally as Snowdrop sings yet. Pansy wears a purple bow while Snowdrop's is green.
- Wiggle (voiced by Marc McMulkin in the Canadian version and Lynn Cleckner in the UK version) is a light blue spider who tends to worry the most out of the group, and is quite emotional.
- Ned (voiced by Jonathan Wilson) and Ted (voiced by Philip Williams) are Australian-accented and New York-accented fire ant brothers. Ned has a tuft of hair between his antenna. Both of them are scheming, mischievous and deceptive, and have only two main interests: food and getting more of it. A common running gag is that when Ted is mistaken for Ned or vice versa, they would say "I'm Ted. He's Ned." or vice versa.
- Stinky (voiced by Scott McCord in the Canadian version and David Holt in the UK version) is a green New York-accented stinkbug who takes up detective work in his free time. He is also very talented at playing the xylophone.
- Felix (voiced by Richard Binsley) is a young and giant leopard frog who longed to be a bug himself and refuses to eat bugs, as he never finds them yummy. Instead, he eats only berries.

=== Recurring ===
- Betty Beetle (voiced by Patricia Gage and Barbara Budd in the Canadian version and Maria Darling in the UK version) is Miss Spider's adoptive mother, the spiderlings' maternal grandmother, and Holley's mother-in-law. It is revealed that when Miss Spider couldn't find her actual mother, Betty decided to adopt her.
- Uncle Asparagus "Gus" (voiced by Peter Oldring in the Canadian version and David Holt in the UK version) is an orange and green jewel beetle who is Miss Spider's adoptive brother, Betty's son, Holley's brother-in-law, and the spiderlings' maternal uncle. He really likes to stargaze with his nephews and nieces.
- Shelley (voiced by Cole Caplan in the Canadian version and Jeremy Clarkson in the UK version) is a snail who is good friends with the Spider family. He is also part of the Sunny Patch Bug Scouts.
- Spindella (voiced by Kristina Nicoll in the Canadian version and Lynn Cleckner in the UK version) is Spiderus' wife whom he met in the Snakey Woods near the farm.
- Mandrake (voiced by Samson Weiss-Willis) is Spiderus and Spindella's son.
- Bella (voiced by Emma Pustil) and Ivy (voiced by Nissae Isen) are Spiderus and Spindella's twin daughters.
- Grub (voiced by Robert Tinkler) is a larva that has told Squirt about the Snakey Woods.
- Whiffy (voiced by Judy Marshak) is a light green stinkbug who is Stinky's sister.
- Grace (voiced by Hannah Endicott-Douglas) is an orphaned baby ladybug who was adopted by Stinky and Whiffy.
- Lily (voiced by Stephanie Morgenstern) is an adult ladybug.
- Snack (voiced by Amanda Soha) is a juvenile ladybug.
- Eunice Earwig (voiced by Cara Pifko) is one of the Spider family's neighbors and the mother of Eddy and Lil Sis.
  - Eddy Earwig (voiced by Ezra Perlman in the Canadian version and Maria Darling in the UK version) is Eunice Earwig's son and oldest child. He is good friends with Squirt.
  - Lil Sis (voiced by Tajja Isen) is Eunice's youngest child and Eddie's younger sister.
- Mr. Mantis (voiced by Wayne Robson in the Canadian version and Tom Eastwood in the UK version) is the teacher of the spiderlings' class.
- Beatrice (voiced by Catherine Gallant) is a queen bee in a hive part of the Hollow Tree.
- Honey (voiced by Isabel de Carteret and Jenny Ryan in the UK version) is the princess of the Hollow Tree and the daughter of Beatrice. She loves honey and hanging out with her friends.
- Cookie (voiced by Susan Roman in the Canadian version and Jenny Ryan in the UK version) is an orphaned monarch butterfly.

=== Villains ===
- Spiderus (voiced by Tony Jay in the Canadian version and Andy Turvey in the UK version) is a short-tempered, stubborn, conniving, arrogant, and cowardly white spider and Spindella's husband. Despite this, he cares for his family and others. He lives in a crack at the bottom of the Hollow Tree. In the third season, Spiderus becomes noticeably nicer and less arrogant after becoming a father.
- Mama Snake (voiced by Alison Sealy-Smith in the Canadian version and Tara Moran in the UK version) is a corn snake that terrorizes the inhabitants of Sunny Patch.
- Baby Snake is the son of Mama Snake.

== Production, broadcast and release ==
The show was first announced on 17 December 2003, as part of a Callaway Arts & Entertainment press release. In January 2004, it was reported that Toronto-based studio Nelvana Limited was animating the show. The show premiered on September 7, 2004, on Treehouse TV in Canada and on Nick Jr. in the US.

On June 20, 2005, a second season with 25 episodes was announced. The second season premiered on March 13, 2006, in the US, with the episode "Captain Sunny Patch" airing that same day. A third season followed and Treehouse TV finished airing the show's final season on June 17, 2007. The series' final episodes did not air in the US until 2009 when many episodes which had yet to be aired in the country were aired on Noggin. The final episode of the show aired on August 9, 2009. Reruns of the show aired on the Nick Jr channel from September 28, 2009, until December 12, 2014. Qubo aired repeats of the show from October 1, 2018, until it discontinued on February 28, 2021, due to Scripps' acquisition.

== Merchandise ==
A video game based on the series, titled Miss Spider's Sunny Patch Friends: Harvest Time Hop and Fly was developed by Shin'en Multimedia and published by The Game Factory for the Nintendo DS in 2006. The game's plot involves Miss Spider, her husband Holley, and their gang of buggies harvesting food and preparing for the coming of winter. The review score aggregator Metacritic gave the game a score of 60 out of 100, based on 5 critic reviews. IGN gave it a 4 out of 10 rating, criticizing it for being overly simplistic. Conversely, the Detroit Free Press, giving it a 75 out of 100, stating that it gets more difficult over time.
