= David Kirk (author) =

American author of children's books

- Born: 1955 (age 70–71)
- Years active: 1994-present
- Children: Violet, Primrose and Wisteria
- Website: davidkirktreehouse.com

David Kirk (born 1955 in Ohio) is an American illustrator and author of children's books. He is the creator of the Sunny Patch brand, which includes a variety of products marketed by Target from 2003 to 2010, and thereafter by Melissa and Doug. The brand spun off from his Miss Spider series of children's books published by Scholastic.

By 2003, all of Kirk's work has been adapted into a children's television show called Miss Spider's Sunny Patch Friends. David created several other toy companies, including Ovicular Toyworks and Hoobert Toys.

== List of works ==
- Miss Spider's Tea Party (1994)
- Miss Spider's Wedding (1995)
- Miss Spider's Babies (1996)
- Miss Spider's New Car (1997)
- Miss Spider's ABC (1998)
- Nova's Ark (1999)
- Little Miss Spider (1999)
- Little Miss Spider at Sunny Patch School (2000)
- Little Miss Spider's Christmas Wish (2001)
- Little Bird, Biddle Bird (2001)
- Little Pig, Biddle Pig (2001)
- Little Bunny, Biddle Bunny (2002)
- Little Mouse, Biddle Mouse (2002)
- Miss Spider's Sunny Patch Kids (2004)
- Nova the Robot, Twinkle Twinkle, Little Hedgehog (2005)
- Nova the Robot Fixes His Spaceship (2005)
- Nova the Robot Builds a Friend (2005)
- The Listening Walk (2005)
- Dashing Through the Snow (2005)
- Nova the Robot, I Smell the Future (2006)
- The Prince, the Princess, and the Bee (2008)
- Oh So Tiny Bunny (2013)
- Oh So Brave Dragon (2014)
- Truckeroo School (2017)
- A Lucky Day (2023)
