= List of literary works by number of translations =

This is a list of the most translated literary works (including novels, plays, series, collections of poems or short stories, and essays and other forms of literary non-fiction) sorted by the number of languages into which they have been translated. Only translations published by established, independent publishers are taken into account, not self-published translations (real or automatic) via print-on-demand or websites, to avoid artificially inflated counts.

== List ==
| # | Title | Author | Date | Number of languages with source | Original language |
|---|---|---|---|---|---|
| 1 | The Bible | See Authorship of the Bible | See Dating the Bible | 4,007 (with at least some portions); 2,574 (at least New Testament); 776 (Old and New Testaments, including the Protocanonical books) | Biblical Hebrew, Biblical Aramaic, Koine Greek |
| 2 | The Little Prince | Antoine de Saint-Exupéry | 1943 | 610 | French |
| 3 | The Adventures of Pinocchio | Carlo Collodi | 1883 | 240–260 | Italian |
| 4 | Dao De Jing | Laozi | 400 BCE | >250 | Classical Chinese |
| 5 | The Pilgrim's Progress | John Bunyan | 1678 | >200 | English |
| 6 | The Communist Manifesto | Karl Marx and Friedrich Engels | 1848 | >200 | German |
| 7 | Alice's Adventures in Wonderland | Lewis Carroll | 1865 | 175 | English |
| 8 | Grimms' Fairy Tales | Jacob and Wilhelm Grimm | 1812–1858 | 170 | German |
| 9 | Steps to Christ | Ellen G. White | 1892 | >160 | English |
| 10 | Don Quixote | Miguel de Cervantes Saavedra | 1615 | >140 (complete and portions) | Early Modern Spanish |
| 11 | Andersen's Fairy Tales | Hans Christian Andersen | 1835–1852 | 129 | Danish |
| 12 | The Book of Mormon | See Origin of the Book of Mormon | 1830 | 115 | English, Golden plates said to be in Reformed Egyptian |
| 13 | Asterix | René Goscinny & Albert Uderzo | 1959–present | 115 (not all volumes are available in all languages) | French |
| 14 | The Quran | See History of the Quran | 650 | >114 | Classical Arabic |
| 15 | The Way to Happiness | L. Ron Hubbard | 1980 | 114 | English |
| 16 | The Prophet | Kahlil Gibran | 1923 | 108 | English |
| 17 | The Upright Revolution: Or Why Humans Walk Upright | Ngũgĩ wa Thiong'o | 2016 | 100 | Gikuyu |
| 18 | The Adventures of Tintin | Hergé | 1929–1976 | 96 (not all volumes are available in all languages) | French |
| 19 | Luther's Small Catechism | Martin Luther | 1529 | 90+ | German |
| 20 | The Imitation of Christ | Thomas à Kempis | 1418 | 95 | Latin |
| 21 | Harry Potter | J. K. Rowling | 1997–2007 | 85 | English |
| 22 | Winnie-the-Pooh | A. A. Milne | 1926 | 74 | English |
| 23 | The Diary of a Young Girl | Anne Frank | 1947 | 73 | Dutch |
| 24 | Das Kapital | Karl Marx | 1867 | 72 | German |
| 25 | The Kon-Tiki Expedition: By Raft Across the South Seas | Thor Heyerdahl | 1948 | >70 | Norwegian |
| 26 | Pippi Longstocking | Astrid Lindgren | 1945 | 70 | Swedish |
| 27 | The Alchemist | Paulo Coelho | 1988 | 70 | Portuguese |
| 28 | Diary of a Wimpy Kid | Jeff Kinney | 2007 | 69+ | English |
| 29 | Sophie's World | Jostein Gaarder | 1991 | 65 | Norwegian |
| 30 | The Adventures of Huckleberry Finn | Mark Twain | 1885 | 65 | English |
| 31 | Nineteen Eighty-Four | George Orwell | 1949 | 65 | English |
| 32 | Through the Looking-Glass | Lewis Carroll | 1871 | 65 | English |
| 33 | The Isha Upanishad | Various | 500 BCE | 64 | Sanskrit |
| 34 | The Tirukkural | Valluvar | c. 300 BCE – c. 450 CE; See Dating the Tirukkural | 63 languages, with 350 translations in total | Old Tamil |
| 35 | Kalevala | Elias Lönnrot (compiler) | 1835/1849 | 61 | Finnish |
| 36 | Quo Vadis: A Narrative of the Time of Nero | Henryk Sienkiewicz | 1895 | 61 | Polish |
| 37 | Jane Eyre | Charlotte Brontë | 1847 | 60+ | English |
| 38 | Uncle Tom's Cabin | Harriet Beecher Stowe | 1852 | 60+ | English |
| 39 | Charlie and the Chocolate Factory | Roald Dahl | 1964 | 60 | English |
| 40 | The Wonderful Adventures of Nils | Selma Lagerlöf | 1906 | 60 | Swedish |
| 41 | The Bhagavad Gita | Vyasa | 400 BCE | 59 | Sanskrit |
| 42 | The Hobbit | J. R. R. Tolkien | 1937 | 59 | English |
| 43 | The Good Soldier Švejk | Jaroslav Hašek | 1923 | 58 | Czech |
| 44 | The Lord of the Rings | J. R. R. Tolkien | 1954–1955 | 57 languages, with 87 translations in total | English |
| 45 | Things Fall Apart | Chinua Achebe | 1958 | 57 | English |
| 46 | A Doll's House | Henrik Ibsen | 1879 | 56 | Norwegian |
| 47 | The Divine Comedy | Dante Alighieri | c. 1308-1321 | 52 | Italian |
| 48 | Seven Brief Lessons on Physics | Carlo Rovelli | 2014 | 52 | Italian |
| 49 | Never Let Me Go | Kazuo Ishiguro | 2005 | 52 | English |
| 50 | The Boy in the Striped Pyjamas | John Boyne | 2006 | 52 | English |
| 51 | The House at Pooh Corner | A. A. Milne | 1928 | 52 languages, with 97 translations in total | English |
| 52 | Autobiography of a Yogi | Paramahansa Yogananda | 1946 | 50 | English |
| 53 | Heidi | Johanna Spyri | 1880 | 50 | German |
| 54 | Little Red Book | Mao Zedong | 1964 | 50+ | Chinese |
| 55 | Out Stealing Horses | Per Petterson | 2003 | 50 | Norwegian |
| 56 | One Hundred Years of Solitude | Gabriel García Márquez | 1967 | 47 | Spanish |
| 57 | The Chronicles of Narnia | C. S. Lewis | 1950–1957 | 47 | English |
| 58 | The Bridge on the Drina | Ivo Andrić | 1945 | 47 | Serbo-Croatian |
| 59 | The Little Witch | Otfried Preußler | 1957 | 47 | German |
| 60 | The Story of San Michele | Axel Munthe | 1929 | >45 | English |
| 61 | 12 Rules for Life | Jordan Peterson | 2018 | 45+ | English |
| 62 | The General of the Dead Army | Ismail Kadare | 1963 | 45 | Albanian |
| 63 | The Stranger | Albert Camus | 1942 | 45 | French |
| 64 | The Very Hungry Caterpillar | Eric Carle | 1969 | 45 | English |
| 65 | The Da Vinci Code | Dan Brown | 2003 | 44 | English |
| 66 | The Governance of China | Xi Jinping | 2014-2025 | 44 | Chinese |
| 67 | The Moomins | Tove Jansson | 1945 | 43 | Swedish |
| 68 | The Robber Hotzenplotz | Otfried Preußler | 1962 | 43 | German |
| 69 | Invisible Cities | Italo Calvino | 1972 | 43 | Italian |
| 70 | The English Roses | Madonna | 2003 | 42 | English |
| 71 | Atonement | Ian McEwan | 2001 | 42 | English |
| 72 | The Great Gatsby | F. Scott Fitzgerald | 1925 | 42 | English |
| 73 | The Kite Runner | Khaled Hosseini | 2003 | 42 | English |
| 74 | Solaris | Stanisław Lem | 1961 | 42 | Polish |
| 75 | A Series of Unfortunate Events | Lemony Snicket | 1999–2006 | 41 | English |
| 76 | The Egyptian | Mika Waltari | 1945 | 41 | Finnish |
| 77 | The Leopard | Jo Nesbø | 2009 | 40 | Norwegian |
| 78 | Before I Go to Sleep | S. J. Watson | 2011 | 40 | English |
| 79 | Hunger | Knut Hamsun | 1890 | 40+ | Norwegian |
| 80 | Miffy | Dick Bruna | 1955 | 40 | Dutch |
| 81 | Paddington Bear | Michael Bond | 1958 | 40 | English |
| 82 | The Tragedy of Man | Imre Madách | 1861 | 40 | Hungarian |
| 83 | Amsterdam | Ian McEwan | 1998 | 39 | English |
| 84 | The Family of Pascual Duarte | Camilo José Cela | 1942 | 39 | Spanish |
| 85 | A Song of Ice and Fire | George R. R. Martin | 1996–present | 39 | English |
| 86 | Dictionary of the Khazars | Milorad Pavić | 1984 | 39 | Serbian |
| 87 | The Time of the Doves | Mercè Rodoreda | 1962 | 38 | Catalan |
| 88 | Silence in the Age of Noise | Erling Kagge | 2016 | 38 | Norwegian |
| 89 | The Bookseller of Kabul | Åsne Seierstad | 2002 | 38 | Norwegian |
| 90 | Mr. Peabody's Apples | Madonna | 2003 | 38 | English |
| 91 | Discworld | Terry Pratchett | 1983–2015 | 37 or 38 | English |
| 92 | The White Guard | Mikhail Bulgakov | 1923–1924 | 37 | Russian |
| 93 | Cold Skin | Albert Sánchez Piñol | 2002 | 37 | Catalan |
| 94 | The Book of Mirrors | Eugen Chirovici | 2017 | 37 | English |
| 95 | Krabat | Otfried Preußler | 1962 | 37 | German |
| 96 | Perfume | Patrick Süskind | 1985 | 37 | German |
| 97 | Anne of Green Gables | Lucy Maud Montgomery | 1908 | 36 | English |
| 98 | Norwegian Wood | Haruki Murakami | 1987 | 36 | Japanese |
| 99 | White Teeth | Zadie Smith | 1999 | 36 | English |
| 100 | Dead Until Dark | Charlaine Harris | 2001 | 35 | English |
| 101 | The Tale of Peter Rabbit | Helen Beatrix Potter | 1902 | 35 | English |
| 102 | Totto-Chan: The Little Girl at the Window | Tetsuko Kuroyanagi | 1981 | 35 | Japanese |
| 103 | Pan Tadeusz | Adam Mickiewicz | 1834 | 34 | Polish |
| 104 | The Paul Street Boys | Ferenc Molnár | 1907 | 33 | Hungarian |
| 105 | Ender's Game | Orson Scott Card | 1985 | 33 | English |
| 106 | Gone with the Wind | Margaret Mitchell | 1936 | 32 | English |
| 107 | Bambi: A Life in the Woods | Felix Salten | 1923 | 32 | German |
| 108 | Atlas Shrugged | Ayn Rand | 1957 | 31 | English |
| 109 | Captain Underpants | Dav Pilkey | 1997–2015 | 31 | English |
| 110 | 'Art' | Yasmina Reza | 1994 | 30 | French |
| 111 | Buddenbrooks | Thomas Mann | 1901 | 30 | German |
| 112 | Chasing Vermeer | Blue Balliett | 2003 | 30 | English |
| 113 | Isadora Moon | Harriet Muncaster | 2016 | 30 | English |
| 114 | The Spiderwick Chronicles | Tony DiTerlizzi and Holly Black | 2003 | 30 | English |
| 115 | The No. 1 Ladies' Detective Agency | Alexander McCall Smith | 1998 | 30 | English |
| 116 | The Pillars of the Earth | Ken Follett | 1989 | 30 | English |
| 117 | The Tale of Genji | Murasaki Shikibu | 1001 | 30 | Early Middle Japanese |
| 118 | Under the Yoke | Ivan Vazov | 1893 | 30 | Bulgarian |
| 119 | The Fountainhead | Ayn Rand | 1943 | 30+ | English |
| 120 | The Capitalist Manifesto | Johan Norberg | 2023 | 30+ | English |
| 121 | Middlemarch | George Eliot | 1871-1872 | 29 | English |
| 122 | The Doll | Bolesław Prus | 1890 | 28 | Polish |
| 123 | Les Misérables | Victor Hugo | 1862 | 20+ | French |
| 124 | The Road to Serfdom | Friedrich Hayek | 1944 | 20+ | English |
| 125 | Water Margin | Shi Nai'an | before 1524 | 20 | Chinese |
| 126 | The Wealth of Nations | Adam Smith | 1776 | 19 | English |
| 127 | Mein Kampf | Adolf Hitler | 1925 | 18 | German |
| 128 | Progress and Poverty | Henry George | 1879 | 14+ | English |

== See also ==
- List of best-selling books
- Index Translationum
