= Translations of Alice's Adventures in Wonderland =

Translations of Lewis Carroll's 1865 novel

Lewis Carroll's 1865 novel Alice's Adventures in Wonderland has been translated into 175 languages. The language with the most editions of Alice in Wonderland in translation is Japanese, with 1,271 editions. Some translations, with the first date of publishing and of reprints or re-editions by other publishers, are:

Language, dialect, script etc.	Year	Title	Translator	Notes
Afrikaans	1934	Avonture van Alida in Towerland	Tannie (pseud.)	Londen: Macmillan & Kie. Bpk.
Afrikaans	1965	Alice se Avonture in Wonderland	André Brink	Kaapstad: Human & Rousseau
Altai	2016	Кайкалдыҥ Јеринде Алисала болгон учуралдар Kaykaldıñ Cerinde Alisala bolgon uçuraldar	Кӱлер Тепуков (Küler Tepukov)	Portlaoise: Evertype, ISBN 978-1-78201-177-4
Appalachian English	2012	Alice's Adventures in an Appalachian Wonderland	Byron W. Sewell and Victoria J. Sewell	Cathair na Mart: Evertype, ISBN 978-1-78201-010-4
Arabic	2012	أليس في بلاد العجائب	شكير نصر الدين (Shakir Nasr Al Deen)	المركز الثقافي العربي
Arabic	2013	أليس في بلاد العجائب	سهام عبد السلام (Seham Saniya Abdel Salam)	دار التنوير - القاهرة
Arabic	2013	مغامرات أليس في بلاد العجائب	نادية الخولي (Nadia El Kholy)	المركز القومي للترجمة - القاهرة
Aragonese	1995	Alizia en o país de as marabiellas	Antonio Gil	Zaragoza: Gara d'Edizions, ISBN 978-84-8094-004-7
Basque	1992	Aliceren abenturak lurralde miresgarrian	Manu López Gaseni	Pamplona: Pamiela, ISBN 978-84-7681-092-7
Belarusian	2013	Алесіны прыгоды ў Цудазем'і (Alesiny pryhody ŭ Cudaziemji)	Max Ščur (Максім Шчур)	Cathair na Mart: Evertype, ISBN 978-1-78201-044-9. Second edition 2016, Portlaoise: Evertype, ISBN 978-1-78201-151-4
Borain Picard	2012	Lès-Aventûres d'Alice ô Pèyis dès Mèrvèy	André Capron	Cathair na Mart: Evertype, ISBN 978-1-904808-87-9
Breton	1995	Troioù-kaer Alis e Bro ar Marzhoù	Herve Kerrain	Kemper: An Here. ISBN 2-86843-097-X
Catalan	1930	Alícia en terra de meravelles	Josep Carner	Barcelona: Edicions Mentora
Catalan	1996	Alícia al país de les meravelles	Salvador Oliva Llinàs	Barcelona: Edicions Empúries
Chinese	1922	阿麗思漫遊奇境記 (Ālìsī Mànyóu Qíjìng Jì)	趙元任 (Zhào Yuánrèn)	Shanghai: 商務印書館 (Shāngwù Yìnshūguǎn)
Chinese	1981	阿丽思漫游奇境记 (Ālìsī Mànyóu Qíjìng Jì)	陈复庵 (Chén Fù'ān)	Beijing: 中国对外翻译出版公司 (Zhōngguó duìwài fānyì chūbǎn gōngsī)
Chinese	2013	愛麗絲夢遊仙境 (Àilì sī mèngyóu xiānjìng)	吳鈞陶 (Ng Gwan Jiu)	Hong Kong: 商務印書館（香港）(The Commercial Press Hong Kong) ISBN 978-96-2070-351-5
Cockney Rhyming slang	2015	Crystal's Adventures in a Cockney Wonderland	Charlie Lovett	Portlaoise: Evertype, ISBN 978-1-78201-115-6
Cornish	1990	Alys y'n Vro a Varthusyon	Ray Edwards	Sutton Coldfield: Kerkewek dre Lyther, ISBN 0-907064-26-4
Cornish	2009	Alys in Pow an Anethow	Nicholas Williams	Cathair na Mart: Evertype, ISBN 978-1-904808-19-0; Second edition 2015, Cathair na Mart: Evertype, ISBN 978-1-78201-095-1 (under the title Aventurs Alys in Pow an Anethow)
Cornu-English	2015	Alice's Ventures in Wunderland	Alan M. Kent	Portlaoise: Evertype, ISBN 978-1-78201-102-6
Croatian	1944	Alica u zemlji čudesa	Mira Šunjić	Zagreb: Matica hrvatska; Numerous re-editions and reprints
Croatian	1995	Alica u zemlji čudesa	Antun Šoljan	Zagreb: Znanje, ISBN 953-6124-90-4
Croatian	2001	Alisa u zemlji čudesa	Predrag Raos	Zagreb: Mozaik knjiga, ISBN 978-953-1959-52-0
Croatian	2002	Alisa u zemlji čudesa	Tatjana Kezele	Zagreb: Zagrebačka stvarnost, ISBN 953-192-082-6
Croatian	2002	Alica u zemlji čudesa	Luko Paljetak	Zagreb: Kašmir promet, ISBN 953-6613-39-5
Croatian	2003	Alica u zemlji čudesa	Ines Knezić	Zagreb: Naša djeca, ISBN 953-171-544-0
Croatian	2004	Alisa u zemlji čudesa	Jelena Bošnjak	Zagreb: Egmont, ISBN 953-187-895-1; Abridged edition for smaller children aged 4-8 based on the Disney animated movie
Croatian	2008	Alica u zemlji čudesa	Luko Paljetak	Zagreb: Medus biro, ISBN 978-953-7227-18-0; Audio book narrated by Dubravko Sidor
Croatian	2009	Alisa u zemlji čudesa	Milica Lukšić	Zagreb: Planetopija, ISBN 978-953-257-150-9
Croatian	2016	Alice u zemlji čudesa	Borivoj Radaković	Zagreb: Edicije Božičević, ISBN 978-953-7953-47-8
Czech	1931	Alenčina dobrodružství v podzemní říši	Jaroslav Císař	Praha: B. Moser
Danish	1875	Maries Hændelser i Vidunderlandet later "Alice i Eventyrland"	D. G. (anon.)	Kjøbenhavn: Fr. Wøldikes Forlag
Dutch	1874 or 1875	Lize's Avonturen in het Wonderland		Nijmegen: Blomhert & Timmerman
Dutch	1887	Alice in het Land der Droomen	Eleonora Mann	Amsterdam: Jan Leendertz & Zoon. New edition 2008, Eindhoven: Chipmunk International, ISBN 978-90-8619-009-6
Dutch	1899	Alice's Avonturen in het Wonderland	R. ten Raa	Leiden: E. J. Brill
Dutch	1907	Alice's Avonturen in Wonderland		Amsterdam: Van Holkema & Warendorf
English (Deseret alphabet)	2014	Alice's Adventures in Wonderland (𐐈𐑊𐐮𐑅'𐑆 𐐈𐐼𐑂𐐯𐑌𐐽𐐲𐑉𐑆 𐐮𐑌 𐐎𐐲𐑌𐐼𐐲𐑉𐑊𐐰𐑌𐐼): An edition printed in the Deseret Alphabet	Lewis Carroll	Cathair na Mart: Evertype, ISBN 978-1-78201-064-7
English (Ewellic alphabet)	2013	Alice's Adventures in Wonderland: An edition printed in the Ewellic Alphabet	Lewis Carroll; transcribed by Doug Ewell	Cathair na Mart: Evertype, ISBN 978-1-78201-035-7
English (International Phonetic Alphabet)	2014	Alice's Adventures in Wonderland (ˈÆlɪsɪz Ədˈventʃəz ɪn ˈWʌndəˌlænd): An edition printed in the International Phonetic Alphabet	Lewis Carroll	Cathair na Mart: Evertype, ISBN 978-1-78201-083-8
English (Ñspel orthography)	2014	Alice's Adventures in Wonderland (Alis'z Advnčrz in Wunḍland): An edition printed in the Ñspel orthography	Lewis Carroll; transcribed by Francis K. Johnson	Cathair na Mart: Evertype, ISBN 978-1-78201-051-7
English (Nyctographic alphabet)	2011	Alice's Adventures in Wonderland: An edition printed in the Nyctographic Square Alphabet	Lewis Carroll	Cathair na Mart: Evertype, ISBN 978-1-904808-78-7
English (Pitman shorthand)	c. 1919–1920	Alice's Adventures in Wonderland: Pitman's Shorthand New Era Edition	Lewis Carroll	London: Sir Isaac Pitman & Sons, Ltd
English (Shaw alphabet)	2013	Alice's Adventures in Wonderland (·𐑨𐑤𐑦𐑕'𐑩𐑟 𐑩𐑛𐑝𐑧𐑯𐑑𐑿𐑮𐑟 𐑦𐑯 ·𐑢𐑳𐑯𐑛𐑼𐑤𐑨𐑯𐑛): An edition printed in the Shaw Alphabet	Lewis Carroll; transcribed by Thomas Thurman	Cathair na Mart: Evertype, ISBN 978-1-78201-036-4
English (Unifon alphabet)	2014	Alice's Adventures in Wonderland: An edition printed in the Unifon Alphabet	Lewis Carroll	Cathair na Mart: Evertype, ISBN 978-1-78201-067-8
Esperanto	1910	La Aventuroj de Alicio en Mirlando	Elfric Leofwin Kearney	Londono: British Esperanto Association. New edition 2009, Cathair na Mart: Evertype, ISBN 978-1-904808-20-6
Esperanto	1996	Alico en Mirlando	Donald Broadribb	Bakers Hill: Bookleaf. Second edition 1999, Jekaterinburg, Sezonoj; Third edition [so stated] 2004, Kaliningrado, Sezonoj; Fourth edition [PDF] 2000, Donald Broadribb (under the title La Aventuroj de Alico en Mirlando); Fifth edition 2012, Cathair na Mart: Evertype, ISBN 978-1-904808-86-2 (under the title La Aventuroj de Alico en Mirlando)
Estonian	1940	Alice Imedemaal	Linda Bakis, poems by Ants Oras	Tartu: Eesti Kirjastuse Kooperatiiv
Estonian	1971	Alice Imedemaal	Jaan Kross	Tallinn: Eesti Raamat. Illustrated by Vive Tolli. There have been reprints with illustrations by Navitrolla (2004, 2006) and John Tenniel (2008)
Faroese	1988	Lisa í Leikalandi	Axel Tórgarð	Gøtu: Aldan. First edition illustrated by John Tenniel, second (2010) by Dušan Kállay
Finnish	1906	Liisan seikkailut ihmemaailmassa	Anni Swan	Porvoo: Werner Söderström OY; Several modified reprints. First editions illustrated by John Tenniel, later by Tove Jansson
Finnish	1972	Liisan seikkailut ihmemaassa	Kirsi Kunnas & Eeva-Liisa Manner	Jyväskylä: Gummerus; Several reprints. Most editions illustrated by John Tenniel, one by Anthony Browne
Finnish	1995	Alicen seikkailut ihmemaassa	Alice Martin	Helsinki: Werner Söderström OY; Several reprints. All editions illustrated by John Tenniel
Finnish	2000	Liisa Ihmemaassa	Tuomas Nevanlinna	Helsinki: Otava; Several reprints. Illustrated by Helen Oxenbury
French	1869	Aventures d'Alice au pays des merveilles	Henri Bué	Londres: Macmillan and Co. New edition 2010, Cathair na Mart: Evertype, ISBN 978-1-904808-52-7
Galician	1984	Alicia no país das marabillas	Teresa Barro & Fernando Pérez-Barreiro Nolla	Vigo: Edicións Xerais, ISBN 978-84-8289-224-5
Georgian	1969	ალისა საოცარ ქვეყანაში (Alisa saoc'ar k'veqanaši)	Alexandre Gamkrelidze	Tbilisi: Nakaduli
Georgian	1997	ელისის თავგადასავალი საოცრებათა ქვეყანაში (Elisis t'avgadasavali saoc'revat'a k'veqanaši)	გიორგი გოკიელი (Giorgi Gokieli)	Tbilisi: Kalta; New edition 2016, Portlaoise: Evertype, ISBN 978-1-78201-160-6
German	1869	Alice's Abenteuer im Wunderland	Antonie Zimmermann	Leipzig: Johann Friedrick Hartknich. New edition 2010, Cathair na Mart: Evertype, ISBN 978-1-904808-45-9
German	1963	Alice im Wunderland	Christian Enzensberger	Frankfurt am Main: Insel-Verlag New edition 2009, ISBN 978-3458351368
Gothic	2015	Balþos Gadedeis Aþalhaidais in Sildaleikalanda	David Alexander Carlton	Portlaoise: Evertype, ISBN 978-1-78201-097-5
Hawaiian	2012	Nā Hana Kupanaha a ʻĀleka ma ka ʻĀina Kamahaʻo	R. Keao NeSmith	Cathair na Mart: Evertype, ISBN 978-1-904808-97-8
Hebrew	1924	עליסה בארץ הנפלאות (Alisa be'eretz hanifla'ot)	L. Siman	Odessa: Omanut
Hebrew	1951	עליזה בארץ הפלאות (Aliza be'eretz hapla'ot)	Aharon Amir	Machbarot Le'Safrut
Hebrew	1989	עליסה בארץ הפלאות (Alisa be'eretz hapla'ot)	Uriel Ofek	Machbarot Le'Safrut
Hebrew	1997	הרפתקאות אליס בארץ הפלאות (Harpatka'ot Alice be'eretz hapla'ot)	Ranah Litvin	HaSifriya HaChadasha. A translation of The Annotated Alice
Hebrew	2012	הרפתקאותיה של אליס בארץ הפלאות (Harpatka'ote'ah shel Alice be'eretz hapla'ot)	Atarah Ofek	Okianus and Modan
Hindi	1982	जादू नगरी (Jādū nagarī)	श्रीकान्त व्यास (Śrīkānt Vyās)	Delhi: Śikṣā Bhāratī
Hungarian	1929	Alisz Kalandjai Csodaországban	Juhász Andor	Budapest: Béta Irodalmi Részvénytársaság Kiadása
Hungarian	1935	Évike Tündérországban	Dezső Kosztolányi	Budapest: Gergely R. Kiadása
Hungarian	2013	Aliz kalandjai Csodaországban	Anikó Szilágyi	Cathair na Mart: Evertype, ISBN 978-1-78201-034-0
Hungarian	2016	Aliz kalandjai Csodaországban (𐲀𐳖𐳐𐳯 𐳓𐳀𐳖𐳀𐳙𐳇𐳒𐳀𐳐 𐲆𐳛𐳇𐳀𐳛𐳢𐳥𐳁𐳍𐳂𐳀𐳙)	Anikó Szilágyi	Portlaoise: Evertype, ISBN 978-1-78201-159-0 (printed in the Old Hungarian alphabet)
Icelandic	1937	Lísa í Undralandi		Bókaútgáfan Esja Reykjavík
Icelandic	2013	Ævintýri Lísu í Undralandi	Þórarinn Eldjárn	Cathair na Mart: Evertype, ISBN 978-1-78201-025-8
Ido	2020	L'aventuri di Alicia en Marvelia	Gonçalo Neves	Dundee: Evertype, ISBN 978-1782012818; Second edition, 2021, Espinho: Editerio Sudo (e-book)
Indonesian	2010	Alice di Negeri Ajaib	Agustina Reni Eta Sitepoe	Jakarta: Elex Media Komputindo, ISBN 978-979-27-7323-1
Irish	1922	Eaċtraḋ Eiḃlís i dTír na nIongantas	Pádraig Ó Cadhla	Dublin: Maunsel & Roberts
Irish	2003	Eachtraí Eilíse i dTír na nIontas	Nicholas Williams	Dublin: Coiscéim; Cathair na Mart: Evertype. Second edition 2007, Cathair na Mart: Evertype, ISBN 978-1-904808-13-8
Italian	1871	Le Avventure d'Alice nel Paese delle Meraviglie	Teodorico Pietrocòla Rossetti	Londra: Macmillan and Co. New edition 2010, Cathair na Mart: Evertype, ISBN 978-1-904808-55-8 (under the title Le Avventure di Alice nel Paese delle Meraviglie)
Jamaican Creole	2016	Alis Advencha ina Wandalan	Tamirand De Lisser	Portlaoise: Evertype, ISBN 978-1-78201-154-5
Japanese	1910	愛ちやんの夢物語 (Ai-chan no Yume Monogatari)	丸山英観 (Maruyama Eikan)	Tokyo: 内外出版協会 (Naigai Shuppan Kyōkai)
Japanese	1911	長編お伽噺 子供の夢 (Chōhen Otogibanashi Kodomo no Yume)	丹羽五郎 (Niwa Gorō)	Tokyo: 籾山書店 (Momiyama Shoten)
Japanese	1912	アリス物語 (Arisu Monogatari)	永代静雄 (Nagayo Shizuo)	Tokyo: 紅葉堂書店 (Momiji-dō Shoten); Originally published in serial form on 少女の友 (Shōjo no Tomo, lit. Girls' Companion) magazine in 1908–1909
Japanese	1920	不思議の國 (Fushigi no Kuni)	楠山正雄 (Kusuyama Masao)	Tokyo: 家庭読物刊行会 (Katei Yomimono Kankō-kai)
Japanese	1923	アリスの不思議國めぐり (Arisu no Fushigi-koku Meguri)	望月幸三 (Mochizuki Kōzō)	Tokyo: 紅玉堂書店 (Kōgyoku-dō Shoten)
Japanese	1925	まりちやんの夢の國旅行 (Mari-chan no Yume no Kuni Ryokō)	鷲尾知治 (Washio Tomoharu)	Tokyo: イデア書院 (Idea Shoin)
Japanese	1925	お轉婆アリスの夢 (Otemba Arisu no Yume)	益本青小鳥 (重雄) (Masumoto Shigeo)	Tokyo: 成運堂書店 (Seiun-dō Shoten)
Japanese	1926	不思議國めぐり (Fushigi-koku Meguri)	大戸喜一郎 (Ōto Ki'ichirō)	Tokyo: 金の星社 (Kin-no-Hoshi Sha)
Japanese	1927	アリス物語 (Arisu Monogatari)	菊池寛 (Kikuchi Kan) and 芥川龍之介 (Akutagawa Ryūnosuke)	Tokyo: 興文社・文藝春秋社 (Kōbun Sha, Bungei Shunjū Sha); New edition 2014, Tokyo: 真珠書院 (Shinju Shoin), ISBN 4880096113
Japanese	1928	不思議國のアリス (Fushigi-koku no Arisu)	長澤才助 (Nagasawa Saisuke)	Tokyo: 英文学社 (Eibungaku Sha); In 1929 or 1930, the title was renamed 不思議の國のアリス(Fushigi-no-kuni no Arisu), which became the most renowned Japanese name in the present day
Japanese	1950	ふしぎな国のアリス (Fushigi na Kuni no Arisu)	吉田健一 (Yoshida Ken'ichi)	Tokyo: 小山書店 (Oyama Shoten); New edition 1993, Tokyo: 河出書房新社 (Kawade Shobō Shinsha), ISBN 978-4309465562
Japanese	1955	ふしぎの国のアリス (Fushigi no Kuni no Arisu)	田中俊夫 (Tanaka Toshio)	Tokyo: 岩波書店 (Iwanami Shoten)
Japanese	1970	ふしぎの国のアリス (Fushigi no Kuni no Arisu)	中山知子 (Nakayama Tomoko)	Tokyo: 文研出版 (Bunken Shuppan); New edition 1986, Tokyo: 岩崎書店 (Iwasaki Shoten), ISBN 978-4265010523
Japanese	1971	不思議の国のアリス (Fushigi no Kuni no Arisu)	生野幸吉 (Shōno Kōkichi)	Tokyo: 福音館書店 (Fukuin-kan Shoten), ISBN 978-4834002683; Pocket edition 2004, ISBN 978-4834019841
Japanese	1975	不思議の国のアリス (Fushigi no Kuni no Arisu)	福島正実 (Fukushima Masami)	Tokyo: 角川書店 (Kadokawa Shoten), ISBN 978-4042118015. Tokyo: 立風書房 (Rippū Shobō), 1982, ISBN 978-4651120034
Japanese	1979	ふしぎの国のアリス (Fushigi no Kuni no Arisu)	芹生一 (Seriu Hajime)	Tokyo: 偕成社 (Kaisei-sha), ISBN 978-4035506300
Japanese	1980	不思議の国のアリス (Fushigi no Kuni no Arisu)	石川澄子 (Ishikawa Sumiko)	Tokyo: 東京図書 (Tōkyo Tosho), ISBN 978-4489012198. With annotation by Martin Gardner
Japanese	1982	ふしぎの国のアリス (Fushigi no Kuni no Arisu)	柳瀬尚紀 (Yanase Naoki)	Tokyo: 集英社 (Shūei-sha); New edition 1990, ISBN 978-4082850180; Pocket edition 1987, Tokyo: 筑摩書房 (Chikuma Shobō), ISBN 978-4480021861
Japanese	1983	ふしぎの国のアリス (Fushigi no Kuni no Arisu)	高杉一郎 (Takasugi Ichirō)	Tokyo: 講談社 (Kōdansha), ISBN 978-4061831162 (Pocket edition); ISBN 978-4061472068 (1986, 新書 (Shinsho)-size edition); ISBN 978-4062850285 (2008, new edition with illustration by 山本容子 [Yamamoto Yōko])
Japanese	1985	不思議の国のアリス (Fushigi no Kuni no Arisu)	高橋康也 (Takahashi Yasunari) and 高橋迪 (Takahashi Michi)	Tokyo: 新書館 (Shinsho-kan), ISBN 978-4403030185; New edition 2005, ISBN 978-4403030345; Pocket edition 1988, Tokyo: 河出書房新社 (Kawade Shobō Shinsha), ISBN 978-4309460550
Japanese	1987	ふしぎの国のアリス (Fushigi no Kuni no Arisu)	北村太郎 (Kitamura Tarō)	Chiba: 王国社 (Ōkoku-sha), ISBN 978-4900456075. Pocket edition 1992, Tokyo: 集英社 (Shūei-sha), ISBN 978-4087520231
Japanese	1990	不思議の国のアリス (Fushigi no Kuni no Arisu)	矢川澄子 (Yagawa Sumiko)	Tokyo: 新潮社 (Shinchō-sha), ISBN 978-4105223014. Pocket edition 1994, ISBN 978-4102401019
Japanese	1992	ふしぎの国のアリス (Fushigi no Kuni no Arisu)	宗方あゆむ (Munakata Ayumu)	Tokyo: 金の星社 (Kin-no-Hoshi Sha), ISBN 978-4323018478
Japanese	1994	不思議の国のアリス (Fushigi no Kuni no Arisu)	高山宏 (Takayama Hiroshi)	新注 不思議の国のアリス(Newly annotated Alice in Wonderland), Tokyo: 東京図書 (Tōkyo Tosho), ISBN 978-4489004469. With annotation by Martin Gardner
Japanese	1995	不思議の国のアリス (Fushigi no Kuni no Arisu)	酒寄進一 (Sakayori Shin'ichi)	Niigata: 西村書店 (Nishimura Shoten), ISBN 978-4890138593. An indirect translation via German version. Illustration by Julia Gukova
Japanese	1998	不思議の国のアリス (Fushigi no Kuni no Arisu)	脇明子 (Waki Akiko)	Tokyo: 岩波書店 (Iwanami Shoten), ISBN 978-4-00-114047-7
Japanese	2003	不思議の国のアリス (Fushigi no Kuni no Arisu)	山形浩生 (Yamagata Hiro'o)	Tokyo: 朝日出版社 (Asahi Shuppan-sha), ISBN 978-4255002170. Pocket edition 2012, Tokyo: 文藝春秋 (Bungei Shunjū), ISBN 978-4167812034
Japanese	2006	不思議の国のアリス (Fushigi no Kuni no Arisu)	村山由佳 (Murayama Yuka)	Tokyo: メディアファクトリー (Media Factory), ISBN 978-4840115100
Japanese	2010	不思議の国のアリス (Fushigi no Kuni no Arisu)	河合祥一郎 (Kawai Shōichirō)	Tokyo: 角川書店 (Kadokawa Shoten), ISBN 978-4042118039
Japanese	2015	不思議の国のアリス (Fushigi no Kuni no Arisu)	高山宏 (Takayama Hiroshi)	Tokyo: 亜紀書房 (Aki Shobō), ISBN 978-4-7505-1428-4. Newly translated by Hiroshi Takayama, who once translated in 1994
Japanese	2015	不思議の国のアリス (Fushigi no Kuni no Arisu)	杉田七重 (Sugita Nanae)	Niigata: 西村書店 (Nishimura Shoten), ISBN 978-4890139644. Illustration by Robert Ingpen
Japanese	2017	不思議の国のアリス (Fushigi no Kuni no Arisu)	安井泉 (Yasui Izumi)	対訳・注解 不思議の国のアリス, Tokyo: 研究社 (Kenkyū-sha), ISBN 978-4327452797. With English parallel text and annotation by the translator
Japanese	2019	不思議の国のアリス (Fushigi no Kuni no Arisu)	高山宏 (Takayama Hiroshi)	In 新訳 不思議の国のアリス 鏡の国のアリス, Tokyo: 青土社 (Seido-sha), ISBN 978-4-7917-7150-9. The third newly translated Alice by Hiroshi Takayama
Jèrriais	2012	L's Aventuthes d'Alice en Êmèrvil'lie	Geraint Jennings	Cathair na Mart: Evertype, ISBN 978-1-904808-82-4
Karelian	2018	Alisan šeikkailut kummanmuas	Aleksi Ruuskanen	Helsinki: Karjalan Kielen Seura, ISBN 978-952-5790-81-8
Kazakh	2016	Әлисәнің ғажайып елдегі басынан кешкендері (Älïsäniñ ğajayıp eldegi basınan keşkenderi)	Фатима Молдашова (Fatima Moldashova)	Portlaoise: Evertype, ISBN 978-1-78201-175-0
Khakas	2017	Алисаның Хайхастар Чирінзер чорығы (Alïsanıñ Hayhastar Çïrinzer çorığı)	Мария Чертыкова (Maria Çertykova)	Portlaoise: Evertype, ISBN 978-1-78201-171-2
Klingon	2021	QelIS boqHarmey	Lieven L. Litaer	Bilingual edition with literal back-translation in English: Egpyt Verlag, ISBN 978-3982396835 in German: Verlag in Farbe und Bunt, ISBN 978-3959362993
Kurdish (Sorani)	2012	Beserhatekanî Alîs Le Wiłatî Seyrusemerekanda	Muhammad-Amin Shasanam	Tehran: Kooleh-Poshti publication
Kurdish (Sorani)	2021	Serkêşîyekanî Alîs Le Cîhanî Seyrusemere	Heło Ferîq	Sulaymaniyah: Řehend Cultural Center
Kurdish (Kurmanji)	2019	Serpêhatiyên Aliceyê Li Welatekî Ecêb	Ciwanmerd Kulek	Istanbul: Avesta publication
Kyrgyz	2016	Алисанын Кызыктар Өлкөсүндөгү укмуштуу oкуялары (Alisanın Kızıktar Ölkösündögü ukmuştuu okuyaları)	Аида Эгембердиева (Aida Egemberdieva)	Portlaoise: Evertype, ISBN 978-1-78201-176-7
Ladino	2014	Las Aventura de Alisia en el Paiz de las Maraviyas	Avner Perez	Cathair na Mart: Evertype, ISBN 978-1-78201-061-6; Second edition 2016, Portlaoise: Evertype, ISBN 978-1-78201-179-8
Ladino	2016	לאס אב׳ינטוראס די אליסייה אין איל פאיז די לאס מאראב׳ילייאס; Las Aventura de Alisia en el Paiz de las Maraviyas	Avner Perez	Portlaoise: Evertype, ISBN 978-1-78201-178-1
Latin	1964	Alicia in Terra Mirabili	Clive Harcourt Carruthers	New York: St Martin's Press; London: Macmillan. New edition 2011, Cathair na Mart: Evertype, ISBN 978-1-904808-69-5 (under the title Alicia in Terrā Mīrābilī)
Limburgish	2012	De Avventure vaan Alice in Woonderland	Yuri Michielsen	Maastricht: Oetgeverij TIC Maastricht, ISBN 978-94-91561-04-7
Lingua Franca Nova	2012	La aventuras de Alisia en la pais de mervelias	Simon Davies	Cathair na Mart: Evertype, ISBN 978-1-904808-88-6
Lingwa de planeta	2014	Alisa-ney Aventura in Divalanda	Anastasia Lysenko, Dmitri Ivanov	Cathair na Mart: Evertype, ISBN 978-1-78201-071-5
Lojban	2005	lo selfri be la .alis. bei bu'u la selmacygu'e	Jorge Llambías et al.	
Low German	2010	Alice ẹhr Ẹventüürn in't Wunnerland	Reinhard F. Hahn	Cathair na Mart: Evertype, ISBN 978-1-904808-62-6
Lule Saami	2021	Lisá Imájájmon	Are Tjihkkom	Ájlátten: Tjihkkom Almmudahka, ISBN 978-82-692239-0-3
Macedonian	1957	Алиса во земјата на чудата (Alisa vo zemjata na čudata)	Славчо Темков (Slavčo Temkov)	Skopje: Издавачко претпријатие „Култура“ (Izdavačko pretprijatie "Kultura").
Maltese	2003	Alice fil-Pajjiż ta' l-Għeġubijiet	John Sciberras	Gudja: Pubblikazzjoni Kotba Sagħtar, Gutenberg Press, ISBN 9990964181.
Manx	1990	Contoyrtyssyn Ealish Ayns Çheer ny Yindyssyn	Brian Stowell	[s.l.]: [s.n.]. Second edition 2006, Rhumsaa: Yn Chesaght Ghailckagh, ISBN 1-870029-33-X (under the title Ealish ayns Cheer ny Yindyssyn). Third edition 2010, Cathair na Mart: Evertype, ISBN 978-1-904808-48-0
Mennonite Low German	2012	Dee Erläwnisse von Alice em Wundalaund	Jack Thiessen	Cathair na Mart: Evertype, ISBN 978-1-904808-83-1
Middle English	2013	The Aventures of Alys in Wondyr Lond	Brian S. Lee	Cathair na Mart: Evertype, ISBN 978-1-78201-031-9.
Neapolitan	2016	L'Avventure d'Alìce 'int' 'o Paese d' 'e Maraveglie	Roberto D'Ajello	Portlaoise: Evertype, ISBN 978-1-78201-155-2.
Neo	2013	L'Aventuros d'Alis in Marvoland	Ralph Midgley	Cathair na Mart: Evertype, ISBN 978-1-78201-019-7
Norwegian	1903	Else i Eventyrland	Margrethe Horn	Kristiania: Olaf Norlis Forlag.
Norwegian	1979	Alice i Eventyrland	Zinken Hopp	Oslo: Aschehoug.
Old English	2015	Æðelgýðe Ellendǽda on Wundorlande	Peter S. Baker	Portlaoise: Evertype, ISBN 978-1-78201-112-5
Palatine German	2013	De Lissel ehr Erlebnisse im Wunnerland	Franz Schlosser	Cathair na Mart: Evertype, ISBN 978-1-78201-042-5
Persian	1959	آلیس در سرزمین عجایب	Hassan Honarmandi	Tehran: Nil
Persian	1997	آلیس در سرزمین عجایب	Zoya Pirzad	Tehran: Markaz
Polish	1910	Przygody Alinki w Krainie Cudów	Adela S.	Warszawa: Wyd. M. Arcta
Polish	1927	Ala w Krainie Czarów	Maria Morawska	Warszawa: Wyd. Gebethner i Wolff
Polish	1955	Alicja w Krainie Czarów	Antoni Marianowicz	Warszawa: Nasza Księgarnia
Polish	1965	Przygody Alicji w Krainie Czarów	Maciej Słomczyński	Warszawa: Czytelnik
Polish	1986	Alicja w Krainie Czarów i Po drugiej stronie Lustra	Robert Stiller	Warszawa: Alfa
Polish	1999	Alicja w Krainie Czarów	Jolanta Kozak	Warszawa: Prószyński i S-ka
Polish	2000	Alicja w Krainie Czarów	Iwona Libucha	Warszawa: Siedmioróg
Polish	2010	Alicja w Krainie Czarów	Krzysztof Dworak	Warszawa: Buchmann
Polish	2010	Alicja w Krainie Czarów	Bogumiła Kaniewska	Poznań: Vesper
Portuguese	1931	Alice no País das Maravilhas	Monteiro Lobato	São Paulo: Companhia Editora Nacional
Portuguese	2010	Aventuras de Alice no País das Maravilhas & Através do Espelho e o que Alice encontrou por lá	Maria Luiza X. de A. Borges	Brazil: Zahar, ISBN 978-85-378-0172-7 (Two books in the same edition)
Russian	1879	Соня въ царствѣ дива (Sonja v tsarstvě diva)	Anonymous; posited to be Ekaterina Timiryazeva (later Boratynskaya)	Moscow: Типография Мамонтова (Tipografija Mamontova); Facsimile edition 2013, Cathair na Mart: Evertype, ISBN 978-1-78201-040-1 in colour, paperback; [s.l.]: Lewis Carroll Society of North America, ISBN 978-0-930326-00-5 in greyscale, hardcover (both under the title Соня въ царствѣ дива: Sonja in a Kingdom of Wonder: A facsimile of the first Russian translation of Alice's Adventures in Wonderland); New edition in modern orthography, 2017, Portlaoise: Evertype, ISBN 978-1-78201-198-9, under the title Соня в царстве дива (Sonja v tsarstve diva)
Russian	1923	Аня в стране чудес (Anja v strane čudes)	В. Сирин (V. Sirin, pseudonym of Vladimir Nabokov)	Berlin: Izdatel′stvo Gamaiun
Russian	1967	Приключения Алисы в стране чудес (Priključenija Alisy v strane čudes)	Нина М. Демурова (Nina M. Demurova)	Sofia: Издательство литературы на иностранных языках (Izdatel′stvo literatury na inostrannyx jazykax)
Russian	1971	Приключения Алисы в стране чудес (Priključenija Alisy v strane čudes)	Борис Заходер (Boris Zakhoder)	Moscow: Pioneer Magazine, 1971 #12, 1972 #2–3
Russian	1977	Приключения Алисы в стране чудес (Priključenija Alisy v strane čudes)	Александр А. Щербаков (Aleksandr Ščerbakov)	Moscow: Художественная литература (Xudožestvennaja literatura)
Russian	1988	Приключения Алисы в стране чудес (Priključenija Alisy v strane čudes)	Владимир Э. Орел (Vladimir È. Orel)	Moscow: Detskaya Literatura
Russian	1991	Приключения Алисы в стране чудес (Priključenija Alisy v strane čudes)	Леонид Л. Яхнин (Leonid L. Jaxnin)	Moscow: Pioneer Magazine, 1991 #1–3
Sambahsa	2013	Ia Aventures as Alice in Daumsenland	Olivier Simon	Cathair na Mart: Evertype, ISBN 978-1-78201-047-0
Samoan	2013	ʻO Tāfaoga a ʻĀlise i le Nuʻu o Mea Ofoofogia	Luafata Simanu-Klutz	Cathair na Mart: Evertype, ISBN 978-1-78201-023-4
Scots	2011	Ailice's Àventurs in Wunnerland	Sandy Fleemin	Cathair na Mart: Evertype, ISBN 978-1-904808-64-0
Scots (Border)	2015	Ahlice's Adveenturs in Wunderlaant	Cameron Halfpenny	Portlaoise: Evertype, ISBN 978-1-78201-087-6.
Scots (Caithness)	2014	Alice's Mishanters in e Land o Farlies	Catherine Byrne	Cathair na Mart: Evertype, ISBN 978-1-78201-060-9
Scots (Glaswegian)	2014	Alice's Adventirs in Wunnerlaun	Thomas Clark	Cathair na Mart: Evertype, ISBN 978-1-78201-070-8
Scots (North-East or Doric)	2013	Ailice's Anters in Ferlielann	Derrick McClure	Cathair na Mart: Evertype, ISBN 978-1-78201-016-6
Scots (Shetland)	2013	Alice's Adventirs in Wonderlaand	Laureen Johnson	Cathair na Mart: Evertype, ISBN 978-1-78201-008-1
Scots (Synthetic)	2013	Ailis's Anterins i the Laun o Ferlies	Andrew McCallum	Cathair na Mart: Evertype, ISBN 978-1-78201-026-5
Scots (Ulster)	2011	Alice's Carrànts in Wunnerlan	Ann Morrison-Smyth	Cathair na Mart: Evertype, ISBN 978-1-904808-80-0; Second edition 2013, Cathair na Mart: Evertype, ISBN 978-1-78201-011-1
Scots (West Central Scots or Ayrshire)	2014	Alison's Jants in Ferlieland	James Andrew Begg	Cathair na Mart: Evertype, ISBN 978-1-78201-084-5
Scottish Gaelic	2013	Eachdraidh Ealasaid ann an Tìr na Iongantas	Moray Watson	Cathair na Mart: Evertype, ISBN 978-1-78201-015-9
Scouse	2015	Alice's Adventchers in Wunderland	Marvin R. Sumner	Portlaoise: Evertype, ISBN 978-1-78201-107-1
Serbian	1923	Алиса у чаробној земљи (Alisa u čarobnoj zemlji)	Станислав Винавер (Stanislav Vinaver)	Beograd: Vreme
Shona	2015	Alice muNyika yeMashiripiti	Shumirai Nyota & Tsitsi Nyoni	Portlaoise: Evertype, ISBN 978-1-78201-066-1
Shor	2017	Алисаның қайғаллығ Черинде полған чоруқтары (Alisanıñ qayğallığ Çerinde polğan çoruqtarı)	Любовь Арбачакова (Liubovʹ Arbaçakova)	Portlaoise: Evertype, ISBN 978-1-78201-189-7
Sinhalese	1963	සිහින ලෝකය	Sudas Maskorale	
Slovak	2004	Alica v krajine zázrakov	Juraj Vojtek	Bratislava: Slovart, ISBN 80-7145-939-9
Slovenian	1951	Alica v Deveti Deželi	Bogo Pregelj	Ljubljana: Mladinska Knjiga
Slovenian	2008	Alica v Nori Deželi	Evald Flisar	Ljubljana: Vodnikova založba, ISBN 9789616067447
Spanish	1922	Alicia en el País de las Maravillas	Juan Gutiérrez Gili	Madrid: Editorial Rivadeneyra
Spanish	2003	Alicia en el País de las Maravillas	Francisco Torres Oliver	Madrid: Ediciones Akal, ISBN 978-84-460-2071-4
Surayt (Turoyo Aramaic)	2015	Alis bu Cëlmo dac Cojube w dat Tantelat	Jan Beṯ-Ṣawoce	Portlaoise: Evertype, ISBN 9781782010821
Swahili	1940	Elisi katika Nchi ya Ajabu	Edward St Lo Malet	Re-edition 1966, London: Sheldon Press
Swahili	2015	Alisi Ndani ya Nchi ya Ajabu	Ida Hadjivayanis	Portlaoise: Evertype, ISBN 978-1-78201-122-4
Swedish	1870	Alice's Äfventyr i Sagolandet	Emily Nonnen	Stockholm: Oscar L. Lamm. Facsimile edition 1984, Stockholm, Rediviva, ISBN 91-7120-179-3. New edition 2010, Cathair na Mart: Evertype, ISBN 978-1-904808-61-9 (under the title Alices Äventyr i Sagolandet)
Swedish	1898	Alices äfventyr i sagolandet	Louise Arosenius	Stockholm: Norstedt
Swedish	1917	Alices märkvärdiga äventyr i Underlandet	Joel Söderberg	Stockholm: Magn. Bergvall
Swedish	1936	Alices äventyr i Underlandet	Nino Runeberg & Arne Runeberg	Stockholm: Natur & Kultur
Swedish	1945	Alices äventyr i sagolandet och Bakom spegeln	Gösta Knutsson	Stockholm: Jan. New edition 1981, Stockholm, Wahlström & Widstrand, ISBN 91-46-13969-9
Swedish	1946	Alices äventyr i underlandet	Gemma Funtek-Snellman	Stockholm: Natur & Kultur
Swedish	1947	Alices äventyr i drömlandet	Rose Svantesson	Stockholm: Harriers Bokförlag Ab
Swedish	1966	Alice i Underlandet	Åke Runnquist	Stockholm: Bonnier; Several editions, the latest being 2000, Stockholm, Bonnier Carlsen, ISBN 91-638-3874-5
Swedish	1976	Alice i Underlandet	Ingalill Behre	Stockholm: Lindblad, ISBN 91-32-11507-5
Swedish	1977	Alice i Underlandet & Spegellandet	Harry Lundin	Uddevalla: Niloe, ISBN 91-7102-074-8
Swedish	2009	Alice i underlandet	Christina Westman	Stockholm: B. Wahlström, ISBN 978-91-32-15664-9
Tongan	2014	ʻAlisi ʻi he Fonua ʻo e Fakaofoʹ	Siutāula Cocker and Telesia Kalavite	Cathair na Mart: Evertype, ISBN 978-1-78201-062-3
Ukrainian	1960	В країні чудес. (V krajini čudes)		Kyiv: Радянський письменник
Viennese German	2013	Der Alice ihre Obmteier im Wunderlaund	Hans Werner Sokop	Cathair na Mart: Evertype, ISBN 978-1-78201-020-3
Walloon	2012	Lès-avirètes da Alice ô payis dès mèrvèyes	Jean-Luc Fauconnier	Cathair na Mart: Evertype, ISBN 978-1-78201-005-0
Welsh	1953	Anturiaethau Alys yng Ngwlad Hud	M. Selyf Roberts	Dinbych: Gee; This translation is in classic literary Welsh and was completely revised for the 1982/2010 edition
Welsh	1982	Anturiaethau Alys yng Ngwlad Hud	Selyf Roberts	Llandysul: Gomer, ISBN 0-86383-047-1. New edition 2010, Cathair na Mart : Evertype, ISBN 978-1-904808-46-6.
Western Lombard	2015	I Avventur de Alìs ind el Paes di Meravili	GianPietro Gallinelli	Portlaoise: Evertype, ISBN 978-1-78201-114-9
Yiddish	2012	אַליסעס אַוואַנטורעס אין וווּנדערלאַנד (Alises avantures in vunderland)	Adina Bar-El	Jerusalem: Zur-Ot, ISBN 978-965-553-032-2
Yiddish	2015	Di Aventures fun Alis in Vunderland	Joan Braman	Portlaoise: Evertype, ISBN 978-1-78201-102-6
Zimbabwean Ndebele	2015	Insumansumane Zika-Alice	Dion Nkomo	Portlaoise: Evertype, ISBN 978-1-78201-113-2
Zulu	2014	U-Alice Ezweni Lezimanga	Bhekinkosi Ntuli	Cathair na Mart: Evertype, ISBN 978-1-78201-065-4

== See also ==
- Translations of Through the Looking-Glass, Carroll's 1871 sequel

== Literature ==
- Lindseth, Jon A. (2015). Tannenbaum, Alan (ed.). Alice in a World of Wonderlands: The Translations of Lewis Carroll's Masterpiece I–III. New Castle: Oak Knoll Press. ISBN 978-1-58456-331-0.
- Weaver, Warren (1964). Alice in Many Tongues: The Translations of Alice in Wonderland. Madison: The University of Wisconsin Press.
