= Translations of Through the Looking-Glass =

Non-English versions of Lewis Carrol's 1871 novel

Lewis Carroll’s 1871 novel Through the Looking-Glass and What Alice Found There has been translated into 65 languages. Some of the translations, with the first date of publishing and of reprints or re-editions by other publishers, are:

Language	Year	Title	Translator	Notes
Afrikaans	1968	Alice deur die spieël	André P. Brink	Cape Town and Pretoria: Human & Rousseau.
Asturian	1992	L'otru llau del espeyu y lo qu'Alicia atopó ellí	Xilberto Llano	Gijón: Llibros del Pexe, ISBN 84-87259-28-6.
Basque	1990	Ispiluan barrena eta Alicek han aurkitu zuena	Manu López Gaseni	Pamplona: Pamiela, ISBN 978-84-7681-095-8
Belarusian	2016	На тым баку Люстра, і што там напаткала Алесю (Na tym baku Liustra, i shto tam napatkala Alesiu)	Max Ščur (Максим Шчур)	Portlaoise: Evertype, ISBN 978-1-78201-149-1.
Catalan	2010	A través de l'espill. I tot allò que Alícia hi va trobar	Amadeu Viana	Barcelona: Quaderns Crema, ISBN 978-84-7727-474-2
Chinese	2003	爱丽丝镜中奇遇记 (Aìlìsī Jìngzhōng Qíyùjì)	吴钧陶 (Wú Jūntáo)	Shanghai: 上海译文出版社 (Shànghǎi Yìwén Chūbǎnshè), ISBN 978-7-7532-7303-5.
Cornish	2014	Der an Gweder-Mires ha'n pyth a gavas Alys ena	Tony Hak	Kindle Edition and, in a combined edition with Alice's Adventures in Wonderland, Truro: Kesva an Taves Kernewek, ISBN 978-1-908965-09-7
Cornish	2015	Der an Gweder Meras ha Myns a Gafas Alys Ena	Nicholas Williams	Cathair na Mart: Evertype, ISBN 978-1-78201-096-8.
Esperanto	2012	Trans la Spegulo kaj kion Alico trovis tie	Donald Broadribb	Cathair na Mart: Evertype, ISBN 978-1-78201-001-2.
Estonian	1993	Alice peeglitagusel maal ja mida ta seal nägi	Risto Järv; poems by Tuuli Kaalep and Risto Järv	Tallinn: Printall. Illustrated by Kati Kerstna.
Faroese	2010	Lisa í Leikalandi og inn ígjøgnum spegilin og tað, sum Lisa upplivdi har	Agnar Artúvertin	Tórshavn: Bókadeild Føroya lærarafelags. Published only in a combined edition with Alice's Adventures in Wonderland. Illustrated by Dušan Kállay.
Finnish	1974	Liisan seikkailut ihmemaassa ja Liisan seikkailut peilimaailmassa	Kirsi Kunnas and Eeva-Liisa Manner	Jyväskylä: Gummerus. Several reprints. Published only in a combined edition with Alice's Adventures in Wonderland. Illustrated by John Tenniel.
Finnish	2010	Alice Peilintakamaassa	Alice Martin	Helsinki: Werner Söderström OY. Illustrated by John Tenniel.
French	1930	Alice au Pays des Merveilles. Suivi de "L’Autre Coté du Miroir."	M.-M. Fayet	Paris: Les Œuvres Représentatives.
French	1961	Alice au pays des merveilles et Ce qu’Alice trouva de l’autre côté du miroir	Jacques Papy	Paris: Jean-Jacques Pauvert.
Galician	1984	Do outro lado do espello e o que Alicia atopou aló	Teresa Barro & Fernando Pérez-Barreiro Nolla	Vigo: Edicións Xerais, ISBN 978-84-7507-171-8
German	1923	Alice im Spiegelland	Helene Scheu-Riesz	Vienna, Leipzig, New York: Sesam.
Hawaiian	2012	Ma Loko o ke Aniani Kū a me ka Mea i Loaʻa iā ʻĀleka	R. Keao NeSmith	Cathair na Mart: Evertype, ISBN 978-1-78201-022-7.
Hebrew	1966	אליס בארץ המראות	[Israel]	
Hungarian	1980	Alice Tükörországban	Révbíró Tamás	Budapest
Indonesian	2010	Alice Menembus Cermin	Agustina Reni Eta Sitepoe	Jakarta: Elex Media Komputindo, ISBN 978-979-27-7323-1
Portuguese	2010	Aventuras de Alice no País das Maravilhas & Através do Espelho e o que Alice encontrou por lá	Maria Luiza X. de A. Borges	Brazil: Zahar, ISBN 978-85-378-0172-7. Two books in the same edition.
Irish	2004	Lastall den Scáthán agus a bhFuair Eilís Ann Roimpi	Nicholas Williams	Baile Átha Cliath: Coiscéim; Cathair na Mart: Evertype. Second edition 2009, Cathair na Mart: Evertype, ISBN 978-1-904808-29-9.
Italian	1947	Viaggio Attraverso lo Specchio	(trad. by Giuliana Pozzo. Illustrated by Felicita Frai)	Milan: HOEPLI OCLC 799492884
Japanese	1899	鏡世界―西洋お伽噺 (Kagami Sekai―Seiyō Otogibanashi)	長谷川天渓 (Hasegawa Tenkei)	Tokyo: 博文館 (Hakubunkan)
Japanese	1998	鏡の国のアリス (Kagami no Kuni no Arisu)	脇明子 (Waki Akiko)	Tokyo: 岩波書店 (Iwanami Shoten), ISBN 978-4-00-114048-4.
Jèrriais	2012	L'Travèrs du Mitheux et chein qu'Alice y dêmuchit	Geraint Jennings	Westport, County Mayo: Evertype, ISBN 978-1-904808-96-1.
Latin	1966	Aliciae per Speculum Transitus	Clive Harcourt Carruthers	New York: St Martin's Press; London: Macmillan.
Russian	1967	Сквозь зеркало и что там увидела Алиса (Skvoz zerkalo i chto tam uvidela Alisa)	Нина М. Демурова (N. M. Demurova). Verses translated by Samuel Marshak, Dina Orlovskaya and Olga Sedakova	Sofia: Издательство литературы на иностранных языках (Izdatelstvo literatury na inostrannykh yazykah).
Spanish	2005	A través del espejo y lo que Alicia encontró allí	Marta Olmos	Madrid: Edimat. ISBN 84-9764-538-3
Swedish	1899	Bakom spegeln och hvad Alice fann där	Louise Arosenius	Stockholm: Norstedt.
Swedish	1945	Alices äventyr i sagolandet och Bakom spegeln	Gösta Knutsson	Stockholm: Jan.
Swedish	1963	Alice i spegellandet	Eva Håkanson	Stockholm: Natur & Kultur.
Swedish	1977	Alice i Underlandet; Alice i Spegellandet	Harry Lundin	Uddevalla: Niloe, ISBN 91-7102-074-8.
Welsh	1984	Trwy'r Drych a'r Hyn a Welodd Alys Yno	Selyf Roberts	Llandysul: Gomer, ISBN 0-86383-047-1.

== See also ==
- Translations of Alice's Adventures in Wonderland
