= Sleeping Dogs (2024 film) =

Film by Adam Cooper

- Release poster
- Directed by: Adam Cooper
- Screenplay by: Adam Cooper; Bill Collage
- Based on: The Book of Mirrors by E.O. Chirovici
- Produced by: Deborah Glover; Pouya Shabazian; Bill Collage; Henry Winterstern; Arun Kumar; Mark Fasano; Adam Cooper
- Starring: Russell Crowe; Karen Gillan; Marton Csokas; Thomas M. Wright; Harry Greenwood; Tommy Flanagan
- Cinematography: Ben Nott
- Edited by: Matt Villa
- Music by: David Hirschfelder
- Production companies: Nickel City Productions; Highland Film Group
- Distributed by: The Avenue (United States); Rialto Distribution (Australia)
- Release dates: March 22, 2024 (United States); August 1, 2024 (Australia)
- Running time: 112 minutes
- Countries: United States; Australia
- Language: English
- Box office: $2.1 million

Sleeping Dogs is a 2024 crime thriller film directed by Adam Cooper in his feature-length directorial debut from a screenplay adapted by Cooper and Bill Collage from the 2017 novel The Book of Mirrors by E.O. Chirovici, and starring Russell Crowe and Karen Gillan.

The film was released in the United States on March 22, 2024.

== Plot ==
Roy Freeman is a retired homicide detective with Alzheimer's disease who is undergoing experimental treatment to help him regain some memories. One day, he receives a call from Emily Dietz, an advocate for prison inmates, who asks him to meet with Isaac Samuel, an inmate soon to be executed for the murder of Dr. Joseph Wieder. Isaac tells Roy he was pressured to confess by Roy's partner, Detective Jimmy Remis.

Roy reviews his old files then meets with Jimmy and asks him why they didn't check into the records of their other suspect, Richard Finn, whose fingerprints were all over Dr. Wieder's house. Jimmy says he will look into the matter.

After he meets with Jimmy, Roy learns of Finn's sudden death. Roy has a fleeting memory of Finn being outside Dr. Wieder's house the day after the murder. Roy meets some of Finn's family members at the funeral and receives a manuscript that Finn had been writing that details Finn's time with Dr. Wieder and with a woman Finn loved, Laura Baines, who was collaborating with Dr. Wieder on her thesis.

Shortly after Dr. Wieder's murder, Laura Baines learned she would not get any credit for her research with Dr. Wieder, after which Laura Baines disappeared.

Roy goes to meet Finn's widow, who recalls a heated conversation Finn had with Dr. Elizabeth Westlake. Roy goes to meet Dr. Westlake. To his surprise, she instantly recognizes him. He learns that Finn had stalked Dr. Westlake and made her feel unsafe. Roy realizes Laura Baines and Dr. Westlake are the same person. He gives Dr. Westlake a copy of Finn's manuscript and leaves.

Roy then meets with Wayne Devereaux, one of Dr. Wieder's former patients. Devereaux mentions that Dr. Wieder, Finn, and Dr. Westlake had gotten into a heated argument.

After Roy returns from meeting with Devereaux, Dr. Westlake arrives at Roy's house to return the manuscript. She refutes the notion that she and Finn were in love. After Dr. Westlake leaves, Devereaux attempts to run over Roy with a pick-up truck but is shot dead in self-defense.

Based on his fractured, but returning memories, Roy goes to a bar that he used to frequent. From the current bartender, he receives some cursory details about a former bartender, Diane. Roy then goes to Dr. Wieder's house. He finds a baseball bat buried in the garden. Dr. Westlake/Laura Baines shows up, followed by Jimmy. They start explaining their connection to Dr. Wieder's murder. After Laura had read Finn's manuscript, she realized that Devereaux would be implicated. Based on that revelation, Jimmy now understands her connection to the deaths of Finn and Devereaux. Jimmy begins to explain it to Roy, but before he can finish, Laura shoots Jimmy who falls to the ground. She then takes aim at Roy, but is shot in the back by the dying Jimmy. Before taking his last breath, Jimmy says he did everything for Roy.

Roy's memories continue to return. He recalls Devereaux mentioning bartender Diane as one of Dr. Wieder's sexual exploits. Roy now realizes that Diane is his ex-wife. Diane had been treated by Dr. Wieder to get rid of painful memories of her alcoholic father. Dr. Wieder took advantage of Diane and got their sex act on tape. Laura Baines handed that recording to Roy who, after watching it, proceeded to Dr. Wieder's home and clubbed him to death. Arriving at the murder scene, Jimmy helped Roy avoid repercussions. As a consequence of their cover-up, Isaac Samuel, an innocent man, spent ten years of his life on death row.

== Cast ==
- Russell Crowe as Roy Freeman
- Karen Gillan as Laura Baines
- Marton Csokas as Dr. Joseph Wieder
- Tommy Flanagan as Jimmy Remis
- Harry Greenwood as Richard Finn
- Thomas M. Wright as Wayne Devereaux
- Elizabeth Blackmore as Dana Finn
- Lynn Gilmartin as Diane Lynch
- Pacharo Mzembe as Isaac Samuel
- Paula Arundell as Susan Avery
- Jane Harber as Catherine Finn
- Kelly Greyson as Emily Dietz

== Production ==
The film is an adaptation by Adam Cooper and Bill Collage of E.O. Chirovici's novel The Book of Mirrors, with Cooper also on-board as director. Mark Fasano of Nickel City Pictures produced, alongside Cooper, Collage and Pouya Shabazian. Matthew Goldberg, Cliff Roberts and Highland Film Group CEO Arianne Fraser served as executive producers.

In August 2022, Crowe was announced in the lead role. In February 2023, Karen Gillan, Marton Csokas, Harry Greenwood and Thomas M Wright were added to the cast.

Principal photography commenced in Victoria, Australia in February 2023, with Crowe making himself at home in Melbourne. Production wrapped in May.

== Release ==
In November 2022, it was announced that Highland Film Group had agreed to distribution deals with Signature Entertainment in the United Kingdom.

Sleeping Dogs was released by The Avenue in the United States on March 22, 2024. The film was released in Australia on August 1, by Rialto Distribution.

== Reception ==
On the review aggregator website Rotten Tomatoes, 44% of 41 critics' reviews are positive, with an average rating of 5.4/10. The website's consensus reads: "Forgetting to give Russell Crowe a compelling mystery to solve, Sleeping Dogs lies down rather than stands on its own." Metacritic, which uses a weighted average, assigned the film a score of 45 out of 100, based on 10 critics, indicating "mixed or average" reviews.
