= The Book of Mirrors =

2017 novel by Eugen Chirovici

- Author: Eugen Chirovici
- Language: English
- Genre: Crime fiction
- Published: 26 January 2017
- Publisher: Century
- Publication place: United Kingdom
- Pages: 336
- ISBN: 9781780895673

The Book of Mirrors is a crime novel by Romanian writer Eugen Chirovici, published on 7 September 2017. It has been translated into 37 languages.

The book was adapted to a movie called Sleeping Dogs in 2024.

== Plot summary ==
Peter Katz, a New York literary agent, receives a submission from Richard Flynn, who in the late eighties was an English Literature student at Princeton and dreamed of becoming a writer. Flynn's manuscript tells the story of his love affair with a Psychology student named Laura Baines, whom he suspects of being in a secret relationship with a famous professor, Joseph Wieder. The professor is murdered, but the police never manage to find the killer. The partial comes to an end at the moment of the crime. The second part is the first-person account of John Keller, a freelance reporter who is trying to reconstruct the circumstances of the same killing for a true crime book. Afraid of the possible legal repercussions of putting forward his theory about the murder, Keller abandons the project.

In the third part, Roy Freeman, the police detective who had investigated the Wieder case, now a reclusive man in the early stages of Alzheimer's, begins his own inquiry, a few months after John Keller spoke to him as part of his research. Freeman receives some vital information about the case from a convict, Frank Spoel, who is awaiting execution at the Potosi Correctional Center in Missouri.
