= Eugen Chirovici =

Romanian author (born 1964)

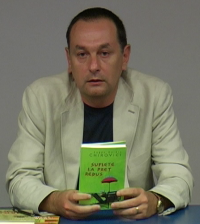
- Born: 1964 (age 61–62); Romania
- Occupation: Writer
- Writing career
- Genres: drama; crime fiction; suspense; thriller

Eugen O. Chirovici (born 1964) is a Romanian author of suspense and crime. Before moving to United Kingdom, he published ten detective novels in his home country. He is best known for his first English novel, The Book of Mirrors. later adapted as a movie Sleeping Dogs.
