= Hassan Honarmandi =

Hassan Honarmandi (Persian: حسن هنرمندی) (March 22, 1928 - September 17, 2002) was an Iranian writer, poet and translator. Born in Taleqan, Iran, he died by suicide in Paris.
