= Eeva-Liisa Manner =

Finnish poet, playwright and translator

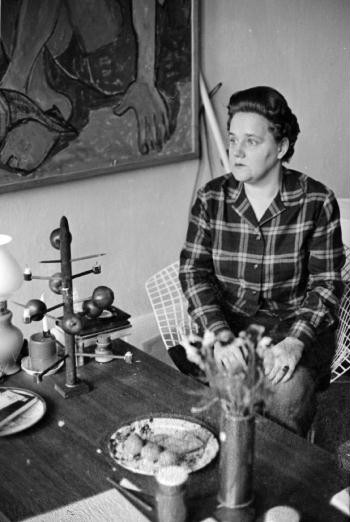
Eeva-Liisa Manner in 1963.

Eeva-Liisa Manner (5 December 1921 – 7 July 1995) was a Finnish poet, playwright and translator.

== Biography ==
She was born in Helsinki, 5 December 1921, but spent her youth in Vyborg (Viipuri).

Manner started as a poet in 1944 with Mustaa ja punaista ("Black and Red"). From her breakthrough collection of poems, Tämä matka ("This Journey", 1956) she was seen as one of the most influential modernists in post-war Finland. Manner wrote over fifteen original collections of poems, plays for theater and radio, novels and short prose. She translated widely in both contemporary and classic literature, including names like William Shakespeare, Lewis Carroll, Hermann Hesse, and Franz Kafka. Her work has been translated to many European languages. Translation of Manner's Selected Poems in English was published in 1997, and the novel Girl on Heaven's Pier in 2016 by Dalkey Archive Press.

Regarding her youth, she said:—

The war years shadowed my youth. I was seventeen when the Russian planes started bombarding my home town of Wiborg on 30 November 1939, damaging it badly. At armistice, Wiborg had to be yielded, it remained behind the border – an endless source of nostalgia for one who had a catlike, persevering fondness for homestead. Even as a ten-year-old, I had spine-chilling dreams about the destruction of Wiborg, and from those times onwards I have been haunted by reflections about the nature and mystery of time. I believe that we have a false conception of time; everything has already happened somewhere in an unknown dimension.

She died 7 July 1995 in Tampere.
