= Nicholas Williams (Celticist) =

Cornish writer (born 1942)

Nicholas Jonathan Anselm Williams (born October 1942), sometimes credited as N. J. A. Williams, is a leading expert and poet in the Cornish language.

== Life ==
While a pupil at Chigwell School, Essex, Williams taught himself Cornish and became a bard of the Cornish Gorseth while still in his teens, taking the bardic name Golvan ('Sparrow'). He read classical languages, English language and Celtic in Oxford. After short periods in the universities of Belfast (where he received his PhD) and Liverpool, he was appointed lecturer in Irish in University College Dublin in 1977. In 2006 he was appointed Associate Professor in Celtic Languages there. He married Patricia Smyth from Portadown, County Armagh in 1976.

== Work ==
Williams has written widely on the Celtic languages and their literatures. His works on Irish include the editions The Poems of Giolla Brighde Mac Con Midhe (1980) and Pairlement Chloinne Tomáis (1981); I bPrionta i Leabhar (1986), an account of Protestant writing in Irish during the 17th century; Díolaim Luibheanna (1993) a discussion of Irish plant names and plant lore; and Armas, a handbook of Irish heraldry in Irish, which he illustrated himself. He also was joint editor of Stair na Gaeilge (‘the History of Irish', Maynooth, 1994) for which he contributed chapters on the Irish dialects of Leinster and on Manx.

As Peter Berresford Ellis points out, Williams was the first professional Celtic scholar to study revived Cornish in depth. In 1990 Williams published an article "A problem in Cornish phonology", demonstrating that the phonemes represented by the graphemes ⟨tj⟩ and ⟨dj⟩ had never been part of the language and should therefore be removed from Kernewek Kemmyn. He continued his critique of this variety of Cornish in Cornish Today (Kernewek Dre Lyther 1995) in which he also set out his own emended Unified Cornish (Unified Cornish Revised or UCR). Williams elaborated UCR in Clappya Kernowek (Agan Tavas, 1997) and in his English-Cornish Dictionary (Agan Tavas, 2000). Spyrys a Gernow published his Testament Noweth, the first complete Cornish translation of the New Testament from the original Greek in 2002. He gave the O’Donnell lectures in Oxford in May 1998, when he spoke on consecutive days on Manx and then Cornish. This was the first time that an O’Donnell lecture had ever been devoted to the Cornish language.

Articles by Williams on Cornish include: "'Linguistically sound principles': the case against Kernewek Kemmyn", Cornish Studies, 4, (1997); "Pre-occlusion in Cornish", Studia Celtica 32 (1998); "Indirect Statement in Cornish and Breton", Cornish Studies 6, (1998); "Saint in Cornish", Cornish Studies 7 (1999) and the review, "'A modern and scholarly Cornish-English dictionary': Ken George’s Gerlyver Kernewek Kemmyn (1993)", Cornish Studies, 9 (2001). Williams together with Graham Thomas edited the Middle Cornish play Bewnans Ke, which had been donated to the National Library of Wales, Aberystwyth, in 2000. Their edition was published by Exeter University Press in association with the National Library of Wales in October 2006.

Williams was awarded first prize in the Gorsedd literary competition three times in the early 1960s. More recently he won first prize for Cornish poetry in the Cornish Gorsedd in 1997, 1998 and 1999. In 1974 Berresford Ellis wrote, "Probably the most able young writer in the language today is N.J.A. Williams (Golvan), a worthy successor to Edwin Chirgwin." Some of Williams's poetry in Cornish was published by Tim Saunders in The Wheel (1990) and Nothing Broken (2006). The Welsh critic Bobi Jones says in the introduction to this anthology, "Nicholas Williams, the well-known scholar, is also the T. Gwynn Jones of Cornwall – polished, classical, rather conservative, soundly rooted in medieval romanticism." Williams's "Ancow Arthur", a translation of Tennyson’s "Morte D'Arthur", published in Delyow Derow 15 (1996) is an example of his verse.

Nicholas Williams is a Fellow of the Linnean Society of London and was awarded honorary membership of the Irish Translators' and Interpreters' Association for his Cornish New Testament. He went on to complete the first ever full translation of the Bible into Cornish in 2011. He has translated four books in the series the Letts Pocket Guides into Irish, Mammals, Insects, Medicinal Plants and Edible Plants. His translation of Alice's Adventures in Wonderland into Irish (2003) received excellent reviews. In November 2004, he published his Irish translation of Through the Looking-Glass. In April 2012, he published his Irish translation of The Hobbit by J. R. R. Tolkien, and in 2014 he published a Cornish version of The Hobbit.

== Coat of arms ==
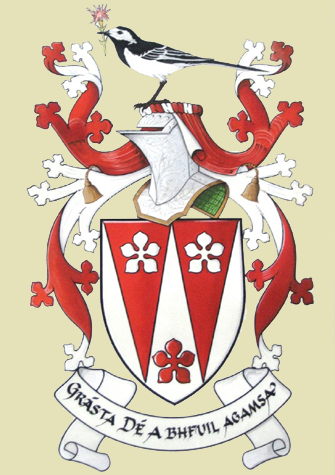
Coat of arms of Nicholas Williams.

Williams's coat of arms was granted by the Chief Herald of Ireland on 1 November 2006. The escutcheon's formal blazon is in Irish, translated here as Argent two piles throughout gules three cinquefoils counterchanged ('On white, two red triangles throughout the shield, three cinquefoils in the reverse colour'); the colours are those of the City of London, and the piles form a W. Along with this was granted a crest, On a wreath of the colours a pied wagtail bearing in its beak Ragged Robin all proper ('On a red and white wreath, a pied wagtail bearing in its beak ragged robin, all in their natural colours'). "Willie wagtail" is common name used for this bird in Ireland. The motto is Grásta Dé a bhfuil agamsa "The Grace of God is all I have"—a pun, where a bhfuil agamsa [ə ˌwɪlʲ ˈaːmˠsˠə] plays on Williams.

== Publications ==
- 1994. “An Mhanainnis”. McCone, Kim; McManus, Damian; Ó hAinle, Cathal; Williams, Nicholas; Breatnach, Liam (1994). Stair na Gaeilge (in Irish). An Nás: Maigh Nuad, pp. 703–44. ISBN 0-901519-90-1.
- 1995. Cornish Today: an examination of the revived language. Sutton Coldfield: Kernewek dre Lyther.
- 1996. “̇ ‘Linguistically sound principles’: the case against Kernewek Kemmyn”. Cornish Studies. Second series: Four. Exeter: University of Exeter Press. pp. 64–87. ISBN 0-85989-523-8.
- 1997. Clappya Kernowek: an introduction to Unified Cornish Revised. Portreath: Agan Tavas. ISBN 1-901409-01-5.
- 1997. “Middle and Late Cornish”, in McCone, Kim (1997). Compendium linguarum Celticarum. Reichert Verlag.
- 1998. “Pre-occlusion in Cornish". Studia Celtica. University of Wales Press. 32: 129–54.
- 1998. “Nebbaz gerriau dro tho Curnoack" (O’Donnell lecture given in Oxford, May 1998)
- 1998. “Indirect statement in Cornish and Breton". Cornish Studies. Second series: Six. Exeter: University of Exeter Press. pp. 172–82. ISBN 0-85989-610-2.
- 1999. “Saint in Cornish”. Cornish Studies. Second series: Seven. Exeter: University of Exeter Press. Pp. 219–241. ISBN 0-85989-644-7.
- 2001. “ ‘A modern and scholarly Cornish-English dictionary’: Ken George’s Gerlyver Kernewek Kemmyn (1993)”. Cornish Studies. Second series: Nine. Exeter: University of Exeter Press. pp. 247–311. ISBN 0-85989-702-8.
- 2006. Cornish Today: an examination of the revived language (3rd ed.). Westport: Evertype. ISBN 978-1-904808-07-7.
- 2006. Writings on Revived Cornish. Westport: Evertype. ISBN 978-1-904808-08-4.
  A compilation of eight articles:
  - “A problem in Cornish phonology”
  - “Which Cornish?”
  - “‘Linguistically sound principles’: the case against Kernewek Kemmyn"
  - “Pre-occlusion in Cornish”
  - “Nebbaz gerriau dro tho Curnoack: A few words about Cornish”
  - “Indirect statement in Cornish and Breton”
  - “Saint in Cornish”
  - “ ‘A modern and scholarly Cornish-English dictionary’: Ken George’s Gerlyver Kernewek Kemmyn (1993)”
  - “Place-name inconsistencies in George’s Gerlyver Kernewek Kemmyn”
  - “Bewnans Ke: Implications for Kernowek Kemyn"
- 2006. Towards Authentic Cornish. Westport: Evertype. ISBN 978-1-904808-09-1.
- 2012. An Hobad, nó Anonn agus Ar Ais Arís (in Irish). Evertype. ISBN 9-781-90480890-9
- 2014. An Hobys, pò An Fordh Dy ha Tre Arta (in Cornish). Evertype. ISBN 9-781-78201089-0
