= Clive Carruthers =

Canadian classicist (c. 1891–1980)

Clive Harcourt Carruthers (c. 1891–1980) was a Canadian classicist.

Carruthers attended Corpus Christi College, Oxford, as a Rhodes Scholar graduating with a Bachelor of Arts degree in 1916. He served in the Canadian Army, briefly taught at the University of Alberta, and, in 1921, started teaching at McGill University in Montreal. From 1929–1950 he served as professor of classical philology; in 1950 he became department chairman; and from 1950–1961 he was Hiram Mills professor of classics.

Following his 1961 retirement Carruthers published scholarly papers about Hittite etymology as well as Latin translations of Alice's Adventures in Wonderland and Through the Looking-Glass by Lewis Carroll.
